= Svengali (disambiguation) =

Svengali is a character in George du Maurier's 1895 novel Trilby.

Svengali may also refer to:

== Film ==
- Svengali (1914 film), an Austrian film starring Ferdinand Bonn
- Svengali (1927 film), directed by Gennaro Righelli and starring Paul Wegener
- Svengali (1931 film), starring John Barrymore and Marian Marsh
- Svengali (1954 film), starring Hildegard Knef and Donald Wolfit
- Svengali (1983 film), starring Peter O'Toole and Jodie Foster
- Svengali (2013 film), starring Jonny Owen and Vicky McClure

== Music ==
- Dr. Svengali, manager of the band The Network
- Svengali (Gil Evans album), a 1973 release by jazz musician Gil Evans
- Svengali (Cakes da Killa album), a 2022 release by hip-hop artist Cakes da Killa
- Svengali (musical), a 1991 musical by Gregory Boyd and Frank Wildhorn
- SVENGALI (band), a 2013 Dubai-based metal band; see Music of the United Arab Emirates

== Other ==
- "Svengali", a song by singer-songwriter Steve Taylor, from his album I Predict 1990
- Sven Gali, Canadian hard rock/glam metal band
- "Svengali", the sixth episode of Law & Order: Special Victims Unit (season 9)
- Svengali deck, a deck of cards used to perform magic tricks
- Svengali, the title of magician Derren Brown's 2011 Tour

== See also ==
- Svengoolie, a hosted horror movie television series
