= Ben Bolt =

American sentimental ballad

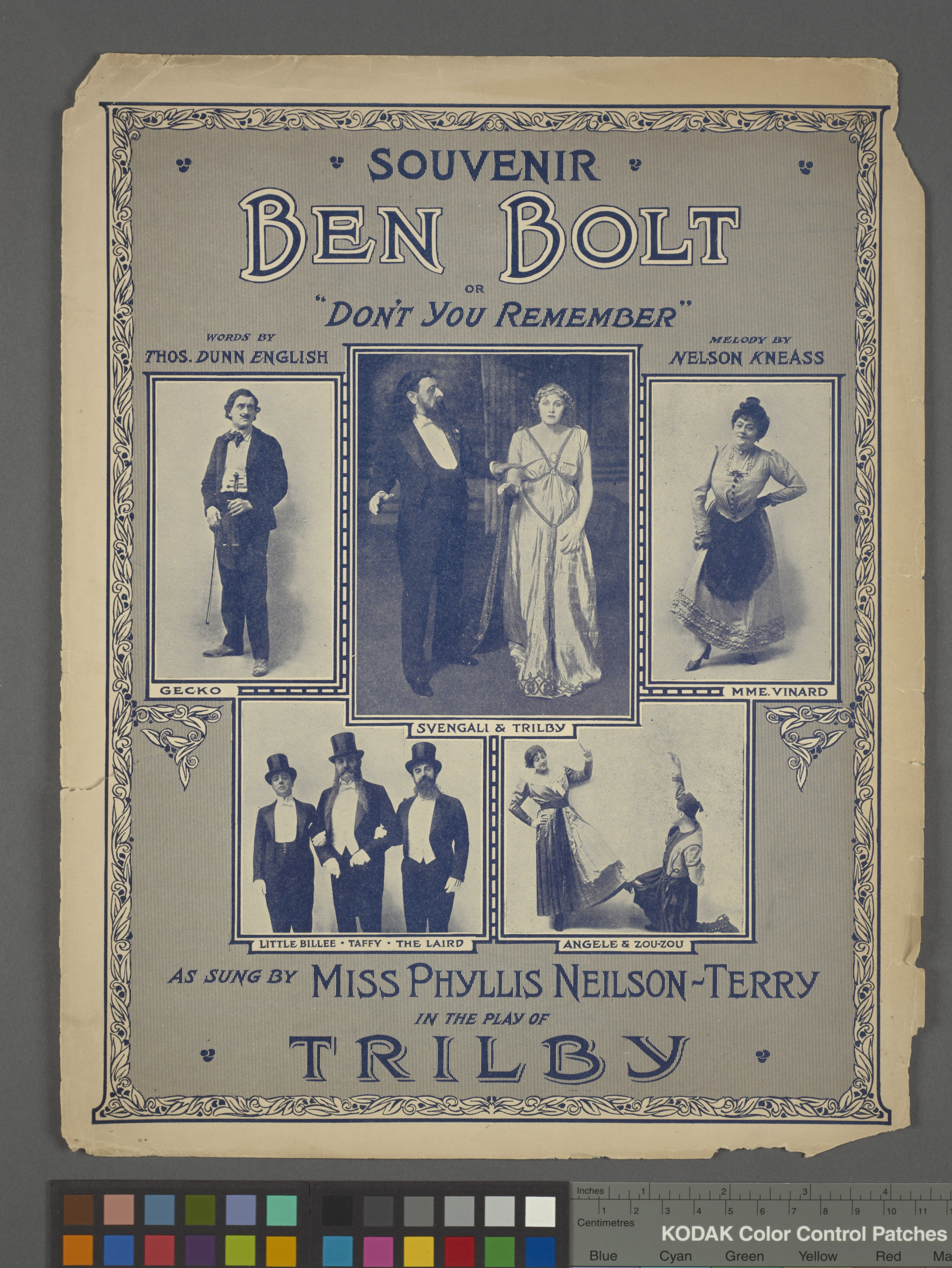
As sung by Miss Phyllis Neilson-Terry in the play of Trilby

"Ben Bolt" (Roud 2653) is a sentimental ballad with lyrics derived from a poem by Thomas Dunn English. It enjoyed widespread popularity throughout the English-speaking world during the nineteenth century.

== History ==
Thomas Dunn English wrote the poem "Ben Bolt" in 1842 at the specific request of Nathaniel Parker Willis. While he was then an active participant in the New York City literary scene and lived much of his life in New Jersey, English is popularly believed to have written the poem while visiting Tazewell, Virginia on a hunting trip, as claimed by regional folklorists.

The poem was published in the New-York Mirror, appearing in print for the first time on September 2, 1843.

The most popular musical arrangement of "Ben Bolt" was composed by Nelson Kneass in 1848. A widely reported story is that Kneass produced the song as accompaniment to a play about the recent Battle of Buena Vista, borrowing the music from a German melody. However, a search through Ludwig Erk's folk song compilation Deutscher Liederschatz produced no songs with similar melodies, and it is much more likely that the tune was an original composition by Kneass.

== Lyrics ==
The poem, which is five stanzas long, describes nostalgic scenes from the life of the anonymous narrator. The narrator, who addresses each memory to the title character, begins the first stanza by describing the life and death of a woman named Alice.

Don't you remember sweet Alice, Ben Bolt,—
Sweet Alice whose hair was so brown,
Who wept with delight when you gave her a smile,
And trembled with fear at your frown?
In the old church-yard in the valley, Ben Bolt,
In a corner obscure and alone,
They have fitted a slab of the granite so gray,
And Alice lies under the stone.

Some variation occurs in the beginning of the poem's fourth stanza. In the original manuscript, the stanza begins as follows:

And don’t you remember the school, Ben Bolt,
With the master so cruel and grim,
And the shaded nook in the running brook
Where the children went to swim?

However, when the poem was arranged to music, the lyrics of that section were changed slightly, so that the relevant lines were as follows:

With the master so kind and so true.
And the little nook by the clear-running brook,
Where we gathered the flowers as they grew?

This mild bowdlerization met with some annoyance from the author. Thomas Dunn English, writing to Harper's Bazaar, commented: "I must protest against this change, because the school-masters of between sixty and seventy years since were, to my memory, 'cruel and grim'; they were neither kind nor true. They seemed to think the only way to get learning into a boy's head was by the use of the rod. There may have been exceptions, but I never met them."

== Cultural impact ==
I am feeling very well and enjoying life as well as an old man can, but this eternal 'Ben Bolt' business makes me so infernally weary at times that existence becomes a burden. The other night, at a meeting of a medical association at my home in Newark, some one proposed that all hands join in singing 'Ben Bolt,' whereupon I made a rush for the door, and came very near forgetting the proprieties by straightway leaving home. However, I recovered my equilibrium and rejoined my friends. I don't think that General Sherman ever grew half so tired of 'Marching Through Georgia' as I have of that creation of mine, and it will be a blessed relief to me when the public shall conclude to let it rest.

— Thomas Dunn English, circa 1895

Shortly after being published, "Ben Bolt" vaulted to nationwide popularity, single-handedly establishing Thomas Dunn English's literary reputation and remaining relevant as a classic American song throughout the nineteenth century. It swiftly became the subject of both tribute and parody, with many sets of variant lyrics. "Ben Bolt" circulated widely in unauthorized broadside format and was selected by Rufus Wilmot Griswold for his anthology The Poets and Poetry of America. The ballad was a particular favorite of Abraham Lincoln during his lifetime.

=== Literature ===
"Ben Bolt" was first adapted into a two act play by the actor and playwright John Beer Johnstone. Johnstone's Ben Bolt premiered at the Surrey Theatre in London on March 28, 1854 in a production by the company of Richard Shepherd and William Creswick with Shepherd in the title role. It was performed widely on stages internationally during the 19th century. An excerpt from Johnstone's play was published in Frank Leslie's The New York Journal in February 1857. It was later published by Samuel French, Inc. in 1899.

In 1894 George du Maurier published his novel Trilby, which uses the song "Ben Bolt" as a plot point. The title character Trilby O'Ferrall is portrayed as incapable of skillful singing when she delivers a tone-deaf version of "Ben Bolt" near the novel's beginning. Later, the failure of Svengali's hypnotic powers is revealed when Trilby is once again incapable of singing "Ben Bolt" with any degree of skill. The success of the novel and the subsequent Trilbyana craze promoted interest in the songs of Trilby. In his old age, Thomas Dunn English contributed a manuscript copy of "Ben Bolt" to an 1895 Trilby-themed charity auction for the benefit of the New York Kindergarten Association.

As a widely known song of the nineteenth century, "Ben Bolt" was popularly used as a cultural reference in books set during that era, whether published in the nineteenth century or decades later. It is quoted in the novel Dr. Sevier by George Washington Cable and by Laura Ingalls Wilder in By the Shores of Silver Lake. Leopold Bloom contemplated Ben Bolt along with other stories about long-lost loves in James Joyce's Ulysses.

James Thurber illustrated "Ben Bolt" as part of a poetry illustration series for The New Yorker.

The song is referenced in the P. G. Wodehouse novels Uncle Fred in the Springtime, when Mr Pott quotes the opening verse to Lord Ickenham, and Full Moon where we are told that "trembling—like Ben Bolt's Alice—with fear at her frown" was a common reaction to Lady Hermione Wedge.

Robert W. Service wrote the poem "Afternoon Tea" in which the narrator, a veteran of World War I, relates an anecdote of his wartime experiences and repeatedly notes humming "Ben Bolt" during the charge.

The song is also cited in the 1881 novel The Sins of the Cities of the Plain, the alleged memoirs of male prostitute Jack Saul and one of the first works of homosexual pornographic literature published in English. In it, one of the characters is said to play and sing a parody of "Ben Bolt" as it had appeared in "The Pearl", a pornographic monthly magazine issued in London during the mid-Victorian period by William Lazenby.

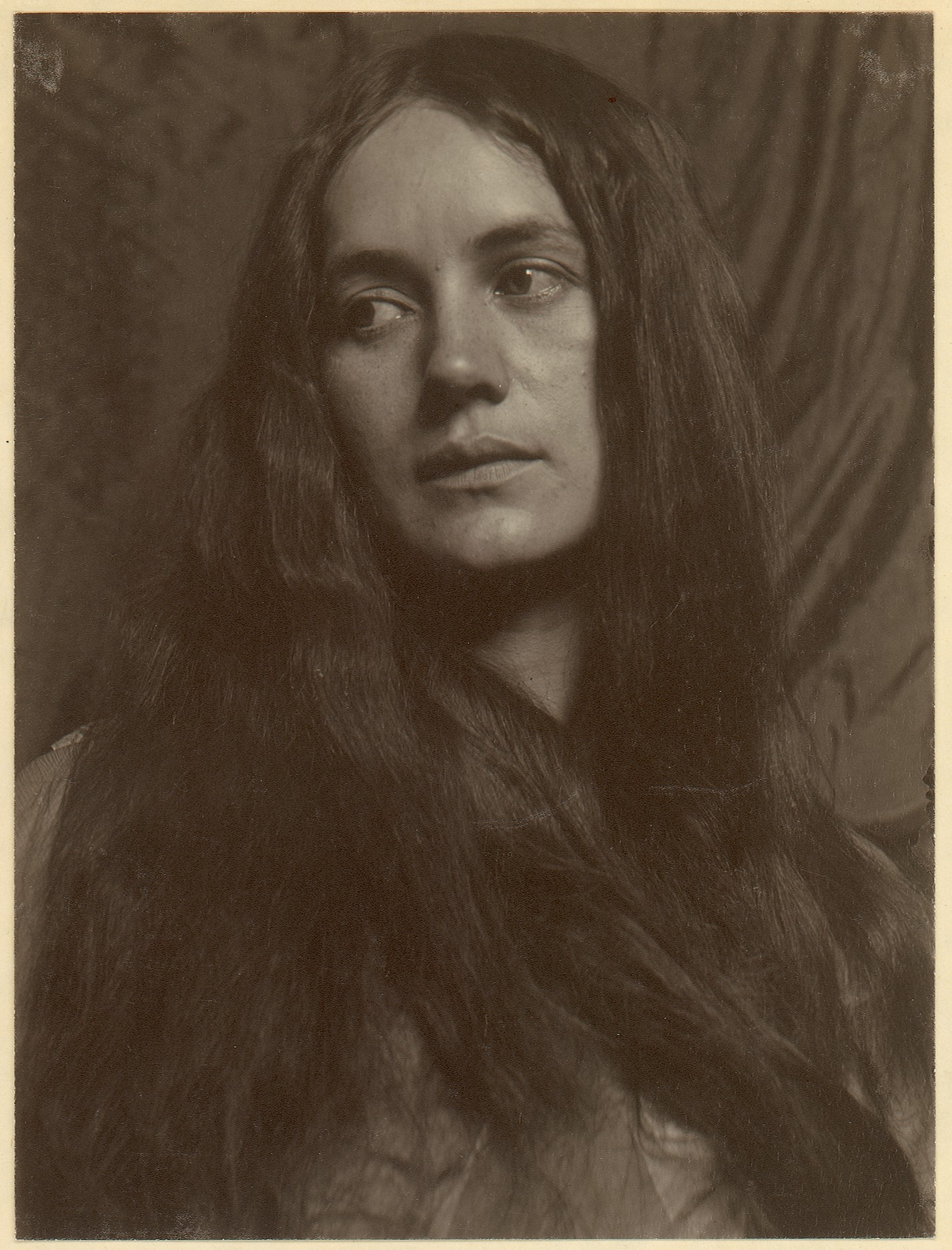
Sweet Alice (Ben Bolt), photograph by Frank Eugene, circa 1900.

=== Film ===
- Norma Talmadge would have the song played in order to get in character for tearful scenes.
- In Svengali (1931), Marian Marsh as Trilby O'Ferrall performs the song.
- In the 1931 film Girls About Town, Lilyan Tashman as Marie Bailey sings several lines, complaining about having to sing such an "old-fashioned song" to make her much older boyfriend happy.
- In the 1939 film Gone with the Wind, Vivien Leigh as Scarlett O'Hara briefly sings several lines from "Ben Bolt."
- In the 1946 film Cluny Brown, Richard Haydn, as Wilson the chemist, plays the song as an instrumental on his antique living room pump organ to impress Cluny Brown in hopes of marrying her.

=== Music ===
- James Bellak, Ben Bolt's Waltz (1850)
- Charles Grobe, [Variations on] "Ben Bolt" (1850)
- William Vincent Wallace, Grande fantaisie de concert sur la ballade Americaine "Ben Bolt" (1853)
- John Philip Sousa, "Ben Bolt" March (1888)
- Charles Ives, Central Park in the Dark (1906)
- Carey Morgan Trilby Rag (1915) a ragtime piano arrangement later also known as Atlanta Rag

Popular vocalists have also recorded covers of "Ben Bolt," from Geraldine Farrar and John McCormack to Joe Dolan and Johnny McEvoy.
