= List of shipwrecks in March 1866 =

The list of shipwrecks in March 1866 includes ships sunk, foundered, grounded, or otherwise lost during March 1866.

== 1 March ==
List of shipwrecks: 1 March 1866
Ship	State	Description
Elizabeth	United Kingdom	The sloop sank at "Bunavoe", Caithness, a hole having been bored in her bottom.
George	United Kingdom	The ship collided with Fanny (United Kingdom) and was beached at Lowestoft, Suffolk. She was on a voyage from Hartlepool, County Durham to Dieppe, Seine-Inférieure, France. She was refloated and assisted in to Lowestoft.
Hoskins	United Kingdom	The brig ran aground at Havre de Grâce, Seine-Inférieure. She was on a voyage from Sunderland, County Durham to Havre de Grâce.
Hygeia	Norway	The brig was wrecked on the Herd Sand, at the mouth of the River Tyne with the loss of one of her eight crew. Survivors were rescued by the South Shields Lifeboat. She was on a voyage from Kragerø to South Shields, County Durham. She was refloated the next day and towed in to South Shields in a waterlogged condition.
Sarah	United Kingdom	The ship struck a sunken wreck and was damaged. She was on a voyage from Sunderland, County Durham to London. She put in to South Shields in a leaky condition.
Unnamed	France	The ship ran aground on Smith's Knoll, in the North Sea off the north coast of Norfolk, United Kingdom. She was refloated and taken in to Great Yarmouth, Norfolk in a severely leaky condition.

== 2 March ==
List of shipwrecks: 2 March 1866
Ship	State	Description
Catharine	(United Kingdom of Great Britain and Ireland) Tasmania	The whaler was wrecked on Chatham Island, New Zealand.
Omar Pasha	United Kingdom	The ship was severely damaged by fire at Hartlepool, County Durham.
Radiant	United Kingdom	The brig ran aground at Copenhagen, Denmark. She was on a voyage from Blyth, Northumberland to Copenhagen. She was refloated.
Victor	France	The ship was abandoned off The Lizard, Cornwall, United Kingdom. Her crew were rescued. She was on a voyage form Cardiff, Glamorgan, United Kingdom to Saint-Malo, Ille-et-Vilaine.

== 3 March ==
List of shipwrecks: 3 March 1866
Ship	State	Description
Catherine	Flag unknown	The whaling barque was lost in fine weather in the Chatham Islands. The ship's master, Captain James Lucas, died on board on February 21, and command passed to a Mr McGuinness who — through inexperience, drunkenness, or a combination of the two — failed to successfully handle the ship.
Squirrel	United Kingdom	The ship was driven ashore at Whitburn, County Durham. She was on a voyage from Sunderland, County Durham to Scarborough, Yorkshire. She was refloated by the tug Confidence (United Kingdom) and towed in to Scarborough.

== 4 March ==
List of shipwrecks: 4 March 1866
Ship	State	Description
Libelle	Bremen	The barque struck the reef at Wake Island and sunk. After three weeks, the crew and passengers departed the uninhabited and dry atoll in a longboat and a gig. The ship's buried and scattered treasure of quicksilver, coins and precious stones was recovered by various vessels over the next two years.

== 5 March ==
List of shipwrecks: 5 March 1866
Ship	State	Description
Economy	United Kingdom	The ship collided with the brig Unity (United Kingdom) and was abandoned in the English Channel off the coast of Dorset. All but one of her crew were rescued by Unity. Economy was on a voyage from Port Madoc, Caernarfonshire to London.
Edgardo	Italy	The ship ran aground "at the second river". She was on a voyage from Reni, Ottoman Empire to Queenstown, County Cork, United Kingdom. She was refloated and towed in to Gibraltar.
John and Betsy	United Kingdom	The smack foundered in the Irish Sea off Holyhead, Anglesey. Her crew were rescued. She was on a voyage from Porthdinllaen, Caernarfonshire to Ardglass, County Down.
Progress	United Kingdom	The ship was driven ashore on "Gronhoe". Her crew were rescued. She was on a voyage from Sunderland, County Durham to Copenhagen, Denmark. She was refloated on 12 March and towed in to Fredrikshavn, Denmark.
Young Mechanic	United States	The medium clipper was destroyed by fire in the Atlantic Ocean. Her crew took to a boat. They were rescued on 10 April by the barque Eugene (France). Young Mechanic was on a voyage from Boston, Massachusetts to Hong Kong.

== 6 March ==
List of shipwrecks: 6 March 1866
Ship	State	Description
Absolem	Denmark	The ship sank at Scarborough, Yorkshire, United Kingdom. She was on a voyage from Copenhagen to Scarborough.
Achilles	United Kingdom	The ship was driven ashore and damaged at Seacombe, Cheshire. She was on a voyage from Liverpool, Lancashire to Calcutta, India. She was refloated and taken in to Birkenhead, Cheshire.
B. A. Jones	United Kingdom	The barque foundered in the North Sea. Four of the ten crew took to the jolly boat. They were rescued the next day by the smack Gauntlet (United Kingdom). The rest were reported missing. B. A. Jones was on a voyage from Middlesbrough, Yorkshire to Newport, Monmouthshire.
Conservator	United Kingdom	The smack struck the breakwater and sank at Holyhead, Anglesey. Her crew were rescued. She was on a voyage from Aberdovey, Merionethshire to Chester, Cheshire. She was refloated with the assistance of a tug.
Empress	United Kingdom	The barque was driven ashore at Punta Mala, Spain. She was on a voyage from Sunderland, County Durham to Malta. She had been refloated by 26 March but ran aground in Gibraltar Bay. She had been refloated by 16 April.
Hubert	United Kingdom	The barque was driven ashore in the River Wear. She was on a voyage from the River Wear to the River Tyne. She was later refloated
Jane Smith	United Kingdom	The ship was driven ashore at Aberdeen. She had become a wreck by 10 March.
Kate Holmes	United Kingdom	The ship was driven ashore. She was on a voyage from Hull, Yorkshire to Martinique. She was refloated and taken in to Ramsgate, Kent.
Lillian	United Kingdom	The brig ran aground on the Steilsand, in the North Sea. She was on a voyage from Hamburg to Hartlepool, County Durham.
Mault	United Kingdom	The smack struck a sunken wreck off Donaghadee, County Antrim and sank. She was on a voyage from Aberdovey, Merionethshire to Londonderry.
Morris	United Kingdom	The ship ran aground on the Mugglins. She was on a voyage from Cork to Dublin. She was refloated and taken in to Kingstown, County Dublin, where she sank.
Perthshire	United Kingdom	The schooner collided with the schooner Breeze (United Kingdom) and ran aground at Harwich, Essex. She was on a voyage from Ipswich, Suffolk to Newcastle upon Tyne, Northumberland.
Vixen	United Kingdom	The ship was run down and sunk off "Inske". She was on a voyage from Limerick to Belfast, County Antrim.

== 7 March ==
List of shipwrecks: 7 March 1866
Ship	State	Description
Auster	United Kingdom	The barque was driven ashore at Breaksea Point, Glamorgan. She was severely damaged by fire on 9 March.
Emil	Bremen	The ship was driven ashore at Breaksea Point. She was on a voyage from Falmouth, Cornwall to Cardiff, Glamorgan.
Emma	United Kingdom	The steamship was wrecked near Tarifa, Spain with the loss of five of her crew. She was on a voyage from Newport, Monmouthshire to Tarragona, Spain.
Fear Not	Prussia	The ship was driven ashore near Hittarp, Sweden. She was on a voyage from Memel to London, United Kingdom. She was refloated and resumed her voyage.
Livonia	(United Kingdom of Great Britain and Ireland) Jersey	The brig was driven ashore at Yarmouth, Isle of Wight. She was on a voyage from South Shields, County Durham to Plymouth, Devon.

== 8 March ==
List of shipwrecks: 8 March 1866
Ship	State	Description
Amsterdam	United Kingdom	The barque was driven ashore and wrecked at Hartlepool, County Durham. All on board were rescued by the Hartlepool Lifeboat. She was being towed from Hull, Yorkshire to Sunderland, County Durham.
Barrington	United Kingdom	The steamship ran aground and was severely damaged at Sunderland.
Euphemia	United Kingdom	The schooner ran aground on The Shingles, off the Isle of Wight. She was on a voyage from Newcastle upon Tyne, Northumberland to Par, Cornwall. She was refloated.
Happy Return	United Kingdom	The schooner was wrecked on the Annot Bank, in the North Sea off the coast of Forfarshire. Her crew were rescued by the Montrose Lifeboat. She was on a voyage from Sunderland, County Durham to Montrose, Forfarshire.
Hetton	United Kingdom	The steamship ran aground at Sunderland and was severely damaged.
Nairnshire	United Kingdom	The brigantine ran aground in Arklow Bay. Her crew were rescued. She was on a voyage from Garston, Lancashire to Dublin.
Pomona	(United Kingdom of Great Britain and Ireland) Victoria	The ship was driven ashore and wrecked 3 nautical miles (5.6 km) east of The Lakes, Western Australia. Her crew were rescued.
Rose	United Kingdom	The schooner was driven ashore at Middleton, County Durham. She was on a voyage from King's Lynn, Norfolk to Newcastle upon Tyne. She was refloated.
Vigilant	United Kingdom	The schooner was wrecked on the Annot Bank. Her crew were rescued by the Montrose Lifeboat. She was on a voyage from Sunderland to Montrose.
Vivid	United Kingdom	The schooner was driven ashore at Kessingland, Suffolk. Her crew were rescued. She was on a voyage from Rochester, Kent to Hartlepool.

== 9 March ==
List of shipwrecks: 9 March 1866
Ship	State	Description
B.L. 686	France	The steam dredger collided with the barque Express (France) and sank at Gibraltar with the loss of five crew.
Cleopatra	United Kingdom	The brig ran aground at Hartlepool, County Durham. She was run into by Agnes (United Kingdom) and was damaged. Cleopatra was on a voyage from London to South Shields, County Durham.
Intrinsic	United Kingdom	The barque was severely damaged by fire at South Shields, County Durham.
Johanna	Norway	The schooner was driven ashore at Spittal, Northumberland, United Kingdom.
John Parker	(United Kingdom of Great Britain and Ireland) British North America	The ship ran aground on the Pluckington Bank, in Liverpool Bay. She was on a voyage from Liverpool, Lancashire to Saint John, New Brunswick. She was refloated and put back to Liverpool in a leaky condition.
Lady Duff	United Kingdom	The ship ran aground at Sunderland, County Durham.
Latona	United Kingdom	The ship ran aground and was damaged at Sunderland. She was on a voyage from Montrose, Forfarshire to Sunderland.
Mazurka	United Kingdom	The brig was driven ashore and wrecked at Winterton-on-Sea, Norfolk. Her ten crew were rescued by the Winterton Lifeboat. She was on a voyage from Tayport, Fife to Barbados.
Victoria	United Kingdom	The ship ran aground at Sunderland.
Violet	United Kingdom	The Yorkshire Billyboy ran aground on the Goodwin Sands, Kent. She was on a voyage from Portland, Dorset to London. She was refloated and put in to Dover, Kent in a severely leaky condition.

== 10 March ==
List of shipwrecks: 10 March 1866
Ship	State	Description
Dorothea	United Kingdom	The ship collided with the brigantine Brothers (United Kingdom) and sank in Mounts Bay. Her crew were rescued by Brothers. Dorothea was on a voyage from Plymouth, Devon to Llanelly, Glamorgan.
Isabel	United Kingdom	The ship was driven onto a reef in Triumph Bay and was wrecked. She was on a voyage from Jamaica to London.
Sea Bird	(United Kingdom of Great Britain and Ireland) Tasmania	The schooner went aground close to Greymouth, New Zealand, and broke up.
St. Lawrence	United Kingdom	The schooner was abandoned in the Atlantic Ocean. Her crew were rescued. She was on a voyage from the Lagos Colony to Liverpool, Lancashire.
William	(United Kingdom of Great Britain and Ireland) New South Wales	The schooner went aground on a spit at the mouth of New Zealand's Grey River, seriously damaging her hull. She was washed off the spit several days later and sank.

== 11 March ==
List of shipwrecks: 11 March 1866
Ship	State	Description
Pearl	United Kingdom	The schooner ran aground on the Salthouse Bank, 5 nautical miles (9.3 km) south of Lytham St. Annes, Lancashire. Her eight crew were taken off the next day by the Lytham Lifeboat. She was refloated on 14 March with assistance from a tug and beached at Lytham St. Annes.

== 12 March ==
List of shipwrecks: 12 March 1866
Ship	State	Description
Amelia	United Kingdom	The ship was wrecked off Barbuda. She was on a voyage from London to Saint Kitts.
Elizabeth	United Kingdom	The ship ran aground at Teignmouth, Devon. She was on a voyage from Newcastle upon Tyne, Northumberland to Teignmouth.
Jane Macdonald	United Kingdom	The ship was driven ashore at Varberg, Sweden. Her crew were rescued. She was on a voyage from Newcastle upon Tyne to Danzig.
Moses Shepherd	United Kingdom	The ship was driven ashore and wrecked at Kilberry, Argyllshire.
Octavia	United Kingdom	The schooner ran aground on the Salthouse Bank, in the Irish Sea off the coast of Lancashire. She was refloated and towed in to Lytham St. Annes, Lancashire.
Pollux	Netherlands	The ship was wrecked at Galle, Ceylon. She was on a voyage from Surabaya, Netherlands East Indies to Amsterdam, North Holland.
Union	United Kingdom	The ship ran aground off Nieuwpoort, West Flanders, Belgium. She was on a voyage from Liverpool, Lancashire to Ostend, West Flanders. She was refloated and taken in to Ostend in a leaky condition.

== 13 March ==
List of shipwrecks: 13 March 1866
Ship	State	Description
Ann and Jane	United Kingdom	The ship ran aground on the Haisborough Sands, in the North Sea off the coast of Norfolk. She was refloated but consequently sank. Her crew were rescued by Monarch (United Kingdom). Ann and Jane was on a voyage from Caernarfon to Middlesbrough, Yorkshire.
Catherine	United Kingdom	The ship was wrecked near Lemvig, Norway with the loss of two of her crew. She was on a voyage from Grimsby, Lincolnshire to Copenhagen, Denmark.
Petrel	(United Kingdom of Great Britain and Ireland) New South Wales	The ship was wrecked at the mouth of the Richmond River. Her crew were rescued.
Reform	Norway	The schooner was driven out to sea from Wick, Caithness, United Kingdom and was abandoned by her crew. She was on a voyage from Kristiansand to Wick. She was boarded by some fishermen who intended to take her in to Cromarty, United Kingdom.
St. Pierre	United Kingdom	The ship departed from Bayonne, Basses-Pyrénées for Cardiff, Glamorgan, United Kingdom. No further trace, presumed foundered with the loss of all hands.
William	United Kingdom	The brig, which had been ashore on Læsø, Denmark and had been refloated and consequently abandoned by her crew, sank off Hirsholmene, Denmark. She was on a voyage from South Shields, County Durham to Swinemünde, Prussia.

== 14 March ==
List of shipwrecks: 14 March 1866
Ship	State	Description
Fortuna	Netherlands	The full-rigged ship was driven ashore at Adinkerke, West Flanders, Belgium. Her sixteen crew were rescued by the Ostend Lifeboat. She was on a voyage from South Shields, County Durham, United Kingdom to Singapore, Straits Settlements. She was refloated on 17 March and towed in to Ostend, West Flanders.
Pacific	United Kingdom	The ship was wrecked on Scroby Sands, Norfolk. She was on a voyage from Exeter, Devon to Sunderland, County Durham.
Portsmouth	(United Kingdom of Great Britain and Ireland) Bahamas	The brig was wrecked at the mouth of the Coega River, north east of Port Elizabeth, Cape Colony with the loss of a crew member. She was on a voyage from New York, United States to Port Elizabeth.
Trio	United Kingdom	The ship was driven ashore near Varberg, Sweden. She was on a voyage from Malmö, Sweden to London. She was later refloated and resumed her voyage, arriving in London on 15 May.

== 15 March ==
List of shipwrecks: 15 March 1866
Ship	State	Description
Arnul	United Kingdom	The smack ran aground on Taylor's Bank, in Liverpool Bay. She sank the next day. Her crew were rescued. She was on a voyage from the Canary Islands to Liverpool, Lancashire.
Eleanor	(United Kingdom of Great Britain and Ireland) New Zealand	The 58-ton paddle steamer was washed ashore three miles north of Greymouth, and became a total wreck.
Eliza	United Kingdom	The schooner was wrecked on the Stackpole Rock with the loss of all five crew.
Elizabeth	United Kingdom	The ship was wrecked on "Roen", in the Baltic Sea with the loss of all hands. She was on a voyage from Newcastle upon Tyne, Northumberland to Swinemünde, Prussia.
Joseph	United Kingdom	The schooner was beached at Newry, County Antrim. She was on a voyage from Swansea, Glamorgan to Newry. She was refloated on 21 March and found to be severely damaged.
Lord Brougham	United Kingdom	The ship was wrecked in the Laccadive Islands. She was on a voyage from London to Bombay, India.
Olga	United Kingdom	The ship was driven ashore at Great Yarmouth, Norfolk.
Prospero	United Kingdom	The brig ran aground on the North Sands, off the coast of County Durham whilst avoiding a collision with Anna Bell (United Kingdom). She was on a voyage from Newhaven, Sussex to Seaham, County Durham. She was refloated but was damaged.
Two Emmas	United Kingdom	The schooner ran aground on the Nore. She was refloated and taken in to the River Thames.
Venus	United Kingdom	The schooner was driven ashore at Sandgate, Kent.
Von Beuningen	Kingdom of Hanover	The schooner ran aground off Agger, Denmark. Her crew were rescued by the Agger Lifeboat. She was on a voyage from Málaga, Spain to Copenhagen, Denmark and Stettin.

== 16 March ==
List of shipwrecks: 16 March 1866
Ship	State	Description
Ada	United Kingdom	The ship was run intp by the brigantine William (United Kingdom) and sank at Milford Haven, Pembrokeshire.
Isabella and Jane	United Kingdom	The ship was driven ashore near "Kingsbora", Forfarshire. She was refloated on 29 March and towed in to Dundee in a severely leaky condition.

== 17 March ==
List of shipwrecks: 17 March 1866
Ship	State	Description
Anna Catherine Gwladys	United Kingdom	The schooner was driven ashore at Gibraltar. She had been refloated by 25 March.
Eleanor Davidson	United Kingdom	The brig was driven ashore at Gibraltar. She had been refloated by 25 March.
Frederick Eugene	United States	The ship was wrecked 10 leagues (30 nautical miles (56 km) south of Cape Mondego, Portugal. Her crew were rescued. She was on a voyage from New York to Marseille, Bouches-du-Rhône, France.
Giraffe	(United Kingdom of Great Britain and Ireland) British North America	The brigantine was wrecked off Cape Freels, Newfoundland. Her crew were rescued.
Ipswich	United Kingdom	The barque was driven ashore in Gibraltar Bay. She was on a voyage from Smyrna, Ottoman Empire to Liverpool, Lancashire. She was refloated on 25 March.
Liconsiglio	Italy	The ship was wrecked off Conil, Spain with the loss of nine of her twelve crew. She was on a voyage from South Shields, County Durham, United Kingdom to Odesa, Russia.
Sultan	United Kingdom	The barque sank off Alexandria, Egypt with the loss of a crew member. She was on a voyage from Troon, Ayrshire to Alexandria.
Tabustinac	United Kingdom	The schooner was wrecked at the mouth of the River Tay. Her crew survived. She was on a voyage from London to Dundee, Forfarshire.
Wonder	United Kingdom	The schooner was driven ashore at Gibraltar. She was on a voyage from Smyrna, Ottoman Empire to Hayle, Cornwall. She had been refloated by 25 March.

== 18 March ==
List of shipwrecks: 18 March 1866
Ship	State	Description
Drogheda	United Kingdom	The barque was driven ashore at Gibraltar. She was on a voyage from Roquetas, Spain to Newcastle upon Tyne, Northumberland. She was refloated on 31 March.
Edith	France	The schooner was driven ashore and wrecked at Annalong, County Down, United Kingdom. Her crew were rescued. She was on a voyage from Nantes, Loire-Inférieure to Newry, County Antrim, United Kingdom.
Hesperus	United Kingdom	The ship was wrecked at Torrox, Spain. Her crew were rescued.
Jeune Mathilde	France	The ship was severely damaged by fire at Helsingør, Denmark. She was on a voyage from Stettin to Dunkirk, Nord.
Promise	United Kingdom	The brig was abandoned by her crew off St. Ubes, Portugal. She was on a voyage from Cardiff, Glamorgan to Alicante, Spain. She foundered on 26 March.
Rainbow	United Kingdom	The ship was damaged by fire at Seaham, County Durham.

== 19 March ==
List of shipwrecks: 19 March 1866
Ship	State	Description
Hesperus	United Kingdom	The schooner ran aground on the Black Middens, in the North Sea off the coast of County Durham. She was on a voyage from Rouen, Seine-Inférieure, France to South Shields, County Durham. She was refloated and taken in to South Shields.
Kathleen	United Kingdom	The schooner was abandoned in the Atlantic Ocean. Her ten crew took to two boats. Four crew in one boat were supplied with provisions by Superb (United Kingdom) and reached English Harbour, Antigua. Those in the other boat were rescued by Emma (United States). Kathleen was on a voyage from Liverpool, Lancashire to Galveston, Texas, United States.
Margaret	United Kingdom	The ship foundered. Her crew were rescued. She was on a voyage from Newport, Monmouthshire to Malta.
Mary	United Kingdom	The steamship ran aground at Castlehaven, County Cork. She was on a voyage from Nassau, Bahamas to London. She was refloated.
Monarch of the Seas	United States	The clipper departed from Liverpool for New York. She subsequently foundered with the loss of all 699 people on board; a lifeboat from the ship containing several bodies washed up on the coast of County Kerry on 9 July and a message in a bottle washed up at Blackpool, Lancashire on 30 June confirming that she had foundered.
Spirit of the Ocean	United Kingdom	The ship was wrecked on a rock in the English Channel off Start Point, Devon with the loss of 38 of the 42 people on board. She was on a voyage from London to Halifax, Nova Scotia, British North America.

== 20 March ==
List of shipwrecks: 20 March 1866
Ship	State	Description
Eliza and Jane	United Kingdom	The brigantine sprang a leak and was abandoned in the Bristol Channel. Her crew were rescued by the schooner Equity (United Kingdom). Eliza and Jane was on a voyage from Cardiff, Glamorgan to Liverpool, Lancashire.
Erin's Pride	United Kingdom	The schooner departed from Cardiff, Glamorgan for Nantes, Loire-Inférieure. No further trace, presumed foundered with the loss of all hands.
Maria Agnes	Netherlands	The barque foundered in the Chops of the Channel. Her crew were rescued by Water Sprite (United Kingdom). Maria Agnes was on a voyage from Batavia, Netherlands East Indies to Amsterdam, North Holland.

== 21 March ==
List of shipwrecks: 21 March 1866
Ship	State	Description
Albertina	United Kingdom	The ship ran aground at Hartlepool, County Durham. She was refloated.
Ann	United Kingdom	The Thames barge sank in the River Thames at the Thames Embankment, London with the loss of four lives.
Margaret Evans	United Kingdom	The ship was wrecked on the Île au Bec, Finistère, France. Her crew were rescued. She was on a voyage from Cardiff, Glamorgan to Nantes, Loire-Inférieure, France.
Mary Curran	United Kingdom	The schooner ran aground on the Clippera Rocks, Anglesey and was severely damaged. She was on a voyage from Runcorn, Cheshire to Cork.
Tahiti	(Russian Empire) Grand Duchy of Finland	The brig was run into by the steamship Lord Barrington or Lord Byron (United Kingdom) and sank in the North Sea 4 nautical miles (7.4 km) off Sea Palling, Norfolk, United Kingdom with the loss of ten of the seventeen people on board. Tahiti was on a voyage from Grimsbyl Lincolnshire, United Kingdom to Alicante, Spain.

== 22 March ==
List of shipwrecks: 22 March 1866
Ship	State	Description
David	United Kingdom	The ship heeled over and sank in Gare Loch whilst coaling Geelong (United Kingdom). Her crew were rescued.
Isabella	United Kingdom	The ship was sighted off the Longships, Cornwall whilst on a voyage from Rouen, Seine-Inférieure to Gloucester. No further trace, presumed foundered with the loss of all hands.

== 23 March ==
List of shipwrecks: 23 March 1866
Ship	State	Description
Alarm	United Kingdom	The ship was driven ashore at Ballycotton, County Cork. Her eleven crew were taken off by the Ballycotton Lifeboat. She was on a voyage from Moulmein, Burma to Liverpool, Lancashire.
Alicia Bland	United Kingdom	The ship collided with the barque Glenfalloch (United Kingdom) 15 nautical miles (28 km) west south west of the Calf of Man, Isle of Man. Seven crew were rescued by Glenfalloch. Four crew were rescued by Charles Chalmer, and the rest were rescued by Star of the West (both United Kingdom). Alica Bland was on a voyage from Liverpool to Bombay, India.
Ann	United Kingdom	The schooner was driven ashore at Great Yarmouth, Norfolk. Her three crew were rescued by the Great Yarmouth Lifeboat. She was refloated the next day and taken in to Great Yarmouth.
Arran Castle	United Kingdom	The paddle steamer foundered in the Firth of Forth between the Mull of Galloway and Ailsa Craig with the loss of all twenty people on board. She was on a voyage from Glasgow, Renfrewshire to London. Wreckage from the ship washed up at Portpatrick, Wigtownshire the next day.
Baron Hambro	United Kingdom	The steamship ran aground at Lowestoft, Suffolk. She was on a voyage from Pomaron, Portugal to South Shields, County Durham. She was later refloated.
Bebee	(United Kingdom of Great Britain and Ireland) Jersey	The brig was wrecked on the Blacktail Sand, in the North Sea off the coast of Essex.
Chieftain	United Kingdom	The ship was driven ashore on Skagen, Denmark. She was on a voyage from Newcastle upon Tyne, Northumberland to Gävle, Sweden. She was refloated and put in to Kristiansand, Norway.
Christina Wabbegina	Sweden	The schooner was driven ashore at Bembridge, Isle of Wight, United Kingdom. She was refloated and taken in to Portsmouth, Hampshire, United Kingdom in a severely damaged condition.
Claudia	United Kingdom	The brig ran aground at Penarth, Glamorgan. She was refloated with assistance from the Penarth Lifeboat and assisted in to Cardiff, Glamorgan.
Confidence	United Kingdom	The ship was driven ashore on Great Cumbrae, Argyllshire. She was on a voyage from Swansea, Glamorgan to the Clyde. She was refloated and towed in to Greenock, Renfrewshire.
East Cornwall	United Kingdom	The schooner ran aground on the Burbo Bank, in Liverpool Bay. She was on a voyage from Fowey, Cornwall to Whitehaven, Cumberland. She was refloated but had to be beached at Liverpool. Her crew were rescued.
Eastward Ho	United Kingdom	The barque was wrecked on the Ridge Sand. Her thirteen crew were rescued by a smack. She was on a voyage from the Gaboon River to Hamburg.
Elizabeth	United Kingdom	The smack sank at Cardigan. Her six crew were rescued by John Stuart ( Royal National Lifeboat Institution).
Esther Dorn	Prussia	The brigantine was driven ashore at St. Austell, Cornwall.
George Ramsey	United Kingdom	The ship sprang a leak and foundered with the loss of all but three of her crew. She was on a voyage from South Shields to Karlskrona, Sweden.
Gitana	Prussia	The ship ran aground in the Humber. She was on a voyage from Hull, Yorkshire, United Kingdom to Copenhagen, Denmark. She was refloated and put in to Grimsby, Lincolnshire, United Kingdom in a severely leaky condition.
Hebe	United Kingdom	The schooner was driven ashore at Theddlethorpe, Lincolnshire. She was on a voyage from London to Newcastle upon Tyne, Northumberland. She had sunk by 28 March. She was refloated on 2 April and towed in to Grimsby, Lincolnshire.
H. E. Spearing	United Kingdom	The ship caught fire and was abandoned in the Atlantic Ocean. She was on a voyage from Galveston, Texas, United States to London.
Jeffrey	United Kingdom	The ship foundered in the English Channel. Her crew were rescued by Lumley (United Kingdom).
Jenny Jones	United Kingdom	The smack was abandoned off Porthdinllaen, Caernarfonshire. Her crew were rescued by the Porthdinllaen Lifeboat.
Jessie	(United Kingdom of Great Britain and Ireland) Isle of Man	The smack was driven ashore and wrecked at Laxey.
John Munroe	United Kingdom	The schooner was driven ashore and wrecked at Plymouth Hoe, Devon. She was on a voyage from Cardiff to Plymouth, Devon. She was refloated on 1 April and towed in to Sutton Pool.
Julia	United Kingdom	The barque was driven ashore near Dundalk, County Louth with the loss of one of her ten crew. Survivors were rescued by the Dundalk Lifeboat. She was on a voyage from Liverpool, Lancashire to Port-au-Prince, Haiti.
Letitia	United Kingdom	The ship was driven ashore and wrecked at Breaksea Point, Glamorgan. She was on a voyage from Plymouth to Watchet, Somerset.
Libertado	Portugal	The schooner was driven ashore and wrecked at Trefusis, Cornwall. Her crew were rescued. She was on a voyage from Newcastle upon Tyne to Viana do Castelo.
Lord Swinson	United Kingdom	The ship was beached at "Penchos", Anglesey. She was on a voyage from Havre de Grâce, Seine-Inférieure, France to Belfast, County Antrim.
Major	United Kingdom	The sloop was driven ashore at Saltfleet, Lincolnshire. She was on a voyage from Colchester, Essex to Goole, Yorkshire.
Maria	United Kingdom	The ship sank at Crookhaven, County Cork. Her crew survived.
Marvel	United Kingdom	The ship was driven ashore at Aberach, Caernarfonshire. She was on a voyage from Portmadoc, Caernarfonshire to Newry, County Antrim.
Mary Louisa	United Kingdom	The schooner was run ashore at Paignton, Devon. She was on a voyage from Caen, Calvados, France to London.
Nouvelle Pauline	France	The full-rigged ship was wrecked at Rio Real, Brazil. Her crew were rescued.
Overy Packet	United Kingdom	The ship ran aground on the Whittaker Spit, in the North Sea off the coast of Essex and sank. She was on a voyage from Burnham Overy Staithe, Norfolk to London.
Spirit of the Ocean	United Kingdom	The barque was wrecked at Prawle Point, Devon with the loss of 38 of the 42 people on board. She was on a voyage from London to Halifax, Nova Scotia, British North America.
Taleburo	Sweden	The brig was wrecked in Sandown Bay. Her twelve crew were rescued. She was on a voyage from Trapani, Sicily, Italy to Bergen, Norway.
Thames	United Kingdom	The schooner was driven ashore and damaged at Ramsey, Isle of Man. She was on a voyage from Dundalk, County Louth to Whitehaven.
Tigris	United Kingdom	The schooner was wrecked on Blackwater Head, County Wexford with the loss of all but one of her crew. She was on a voyage from Falmouth, Cornwall to Liverpool, Lancashire.
Vesta	United Kingdom	The brig foundered in Swansea Bay, Wales. Her eleven crew were rescued by the Swansea Lifeboat Martha and Anne ( Royal National Lifeboat Institution).
Young	United Kingdom	The barque was destroyed by fire in the English Channel 25 nautical miles (46 km) off The Lizard, Cornwall. Her eleven crew were rescued by the pilot cutter No. 4 (United Kingdom). Young was on a voyage from South Shields, County Durham to Alexandria, Egypt.

== 24 March ==
List of shipwrecks: 24 March 1866
Ship	State	Description
Bloomer	United Kingdom	The ship foundered in the Atlantic Ocean with the loss of five of her crew. Survivors were rescued by Germania (Prussia). Bloomer was on a voyage from Cardiff, Glamorgan to Aden.
Elizabeth	United Kingdom	The ship ran aground at Cardigan. Her six crew were rescued by the Cardigan Lifeboat.
Flying Foam	(United Kingdom of Great Britain and Ireland) Jersey	The ship ran aground and was damaged at Dover, Kent. she was on a voyage from Cephalonia, Greece to London.
Gipsey	United Kingdom	The Yorkshire Billyboy was driven ashore and wrecked at Redcar, Yorkshire. All four people on board were rescued by the Redcar Lifeboat Crossley ( Royal National Lifeboat Institution).
Harriet	United Kingdom	The brig foundered in the Atlantic Ocean with the loss of four of her seven crew. Survivors were rescued by the brig Tiber ( (United Kingdom of Great Britain and Ireland) British North America. Harriet was on a voyage from Ardrossan, Ayrshire to Bordeaux, Gironde, France.
Howard	United Kingdom	The ship foundered in the Atlantic Ocean. All 34 people on board were rescued by Douglas Castle (United Kingdom). Howard was on a voyage from Liverpool, Lancashire to Eastport, Maine, United States and Saint John, New Brunswick, British North America.
Jane	United Kingdom	The brig ran aground on the North Bull, in the Irish Sea off the coast of County Dublin. Her crew survived. She was on a voyage from Llanelly, Glamorgan to Dublin.
Lady Grant	United Kingdom	The smack was driven ashore on the Isle of Arran. She was consequently condemned.
Liberstare	Flag unknown	The ship was wrecked at Trefusis, Cornwall. She was on a voyage from South Shields, County Durham, United Kingdom to "Viuna".
Missionary	United Kingdom	The brig foundered in the North Sea. Her crew were rescued by a fishing smack.
Montezuma	United Kingdom	The barque foundered 1 nautical mile (1.9 km) east by south of The Smalls with the loss of all fifteen crew. She was on a voyage from Cardiff to Swansea, Glamorgan.
Osprey	United Kingdom	The schooner sprang a leak and was run ashore north of Clogherhead, County Louth. Her crew were rescued. She was on a voyage from Silloth, Cumberland to Dublin. She was refloated on 28 March and towed in to Drogheda.
Paquette do Rio Grande	Portugal	The barque was driven against the breakwater and severely damaged at Holyhead, Anglesey, United Kingdom. She was abandoned by her crew. She was on a voyage from Liverpool, Lancashire, United Kingdom to Porto.
Peerless	United Kingdom	The schooner was wrecked on the Goodwin Sands, Kent with the loss of one of her six crew. Survivors were rescued by the North Deal Lifeboat Vankook ( Royal National Lifeboat Institution). Peerless was on a voyage from Whitehaven, Cumberland to Rotterdam, South Holland, Netherlands.
Pegasus	United Kingdom	The ship was driven ashore at the mouth of the Humber. She was on a voyage from Hull, Yorkshire to South Shields, County Durham and/or Newcastle upon Tyne, Northumberland. She was refloated.
Providentia	Norway	The brig was driven ashore and wrecked at Peterhead, Aberdeenshire, United Kingdom. Her eight crew were rescued by the Peterhead Lifeboat. She was on a voyage from Dram to the Firth of Forth.
Queen of the Isles	United Kingdom	The schooner was driven against the breakwater and sank at Holyhead. Her crew survived. She was on a voyage from Penzance, Cornwall to Liverpool.
Vesta	United Kingdom	The brig sank off Swansea, Glamorgan. Her crew were rescued by the Swansea Lifeboat. She was on a voyage from Whitby, Yorkshire to Fécamp, Seine-Inférieure, France.
Unnamed	United Kingdom	The schooner foundered off Bardsey Island, Pembrokeshire with the loss of all five crew.

== 25 March ==
List of shipwrecks: 25 March 1866
Ship	State	Description
Charlotte	Netherlands	The schooner was driven ashore. She was on a voyage from Dunkirk, Nord, France to Londonderry, United Kingdom. She was refloated on 27 March and towed in to Belfast, County Antrim, United Kingdom.
Charlotte	United Kingdom	The ship ran aground at Falmouth, Cornwall. She was on a voyage from Newcastle upon Tyne, Northumberland to Jamaica. She was refloated.
Empress	United Kingdom	The barque was abandoned in the Atlantic Ocean 120 nautical miles (220 km) off the Isles of Scilly. Her crew were rescued by Arbutus (United Kingdom). Empress was on a voyage from Moulmein, Burma to Liverpool, Lancashire. She may have caught fire or been set afire on being abandoned. Empress was sighted on 1 April 25 nautical miles (46 km) north by east of Cape Cornwall, Cornwall with her aft burnt down to the waterline and in a waterlogged condition. The tugs Constitution and Rock Light (both United Kingdom towed her in to Holyhead, Anglesey in a capsized condition on 23 April.
Fahle Bure	Sweden	The ship brig was driven ashore at Sandown, Isle of Wight, United Kingdom. Her eight crew were rescued by the Coastguard.
Joseph Soames	United Kingdom	The steamship was driven ashore at Swinemünde, Prussia. She was on a voyage from Stettin to Helsingør, Denmark and Hull, Yorkshire. She was later refloated and resumed her voyage.
New Times	(United Kingdom of Great Britain and Ireland) British North America	The schooner was sunk by ice in Bird Island Cove.
Salem	United Kingdom	The brig foundered in the North Sea 70 nautical miles (130 km) west of Lindesnes, Norway. Her crew were rescued by a smack. She was on a voyage from Blyth, Northumberland to a Baltic port.
Wealands	United Kingdom	The brig foundered in the Atlantic Ocean 50 nautical miles (93 km) south west of the Isles of Scilly. Her crew were rescued by the brig Derize Jaillez (France}). Wealands was on a voyage from Sunderland, County Durham to Porto, Portugal.

== 26 March ==
List of shipwrecks: 26 March 1866
Ship	State	Description
British Monarch	United Kingdom	The barque was wrecked at Salinas, Brazil with the loss of a crew member. She was on a voyage from Cardiff, Glamorgan to Pará, Brazil.
Claudia	United Kingdom	The brig was beached at Cardiff, Glamorgan. She was on a voyage from Cardiff to Liverpool, Lancashire.
John S. Harris	United Kingdom	The ship was driven onto rocks at Milford Haven, Pembrokeshire and was severely damaged. She was on a voyage from Mobile, Alabama to Liverpool. She was refloated and taken in to Milford Haven in a leaky condition.
Maggie	United Kingdom	The ship was driven ashore at Bude, Cornwall. She was on a voyage from Bude to a Welsh port.
Rose	United Kingdom	The schooner was driven ashore at Sidestrand, Norfolk. She was on a voyage from Portmadoc, Caernarfonshire to Newcastle upon Tyne, Northumberland.

== 27 March ==
List of shipwrecks: 27 March 1866
Ship	State	Description
Adam Lodge	United Kingdom	The ship was driven ashore in Gibraltar Bay. She was refloated and resumed her voyage.
Amore	United Kingdom	The barque was driven ashore in Gibraltar Bay.
Anna Maria	United Kingdom	The brig was driven ashore in Gibraltar Bay. She was on a voyage from Newcastle upon Tyne, Northumberland to Gibraltar. She was consequently condemned.
Aurora	United Kingdom	The ship was driven ashore in Gibraltar Bay. She was on a voyage from Alexandria, Egypt to Gibraltar. She was refloated on 29 March.
Coburg	United Kingdom	The ship foundered off Inchkeith, Fife. Her crew were rescued. She was on a voyage from Middlesbrough, Yorkshire to Korsør, Denmark.
Constant	France	The ship was driven ashore in Gibraltar Bay. She was on a voyage from Marseille, Bouches-du-Rhône to Rouen, Seine-Inférieure. She was refloated on 29 March.
Croladys	United Kingdom	The schooner was driven ashore in Gibraltar Bay. She was on a voyage from Cardiff to Smyrna, Ottoman Empire.
Eleanor Davidson	United Kingdom	The brig was driven ashore in Gibraltar Bay. She was on a voyage from Newcastle upon Tyne to Gibraltar.
Ellen Catharine Rees	United Kingdom	The ship was driven ashore in Gibraltar Bay. She was refloated on 26 March.
Emily	United Kingdom	The brig foundered in the North Sea 200 nautical miles (370 km) off the coast of Northumberland with the loss of a crew member. Survivors took to a boat; they were rescued by the brig Baltic (United Kingdom). Emily was on a voyage from Middlesbrough, Yorkshire to Gothenburg, Sweden.
Hope	United Kingdom	The brig was driven ashore in Gibraltar Bay. She was on a voyage from Cardiff to Gibraltar.
Inanda Jellod	United Kingdom	The ship was driven ashore in Gibraltar Bay. She was on a voyage from Liverpool, Lancashire to Gibraltar. She was refloated on 29 March.
Munda	United Kingdom	The brig was driven ashore in Gibraltar Bay. She was on a voyage from Liverpool to Gibraltar.
Palmerston	United Kingdom	The ship was abandoned in the South China Sea 210 nautical miles (390 km) off Hong Kong. Her crew were rescued by the barque Amar (Hamburg).
Stamboul	United Kingdom	The barque was driven ashore in Gibraltar Bay. She was on a voyage from Maranhão, Brazil to Liverpool. She was refloated on 3 April and taken in to Gibraltar in a leaky condition.
Thistle	(United Kingdom of Great Britain and Ireland) South Australia	The schooner was wrecked at Cape Jervis. Her crew were rescued.
Thomas Lord	United Kingdom	The ship was driven ashore in Gibraltar Bay. She was on a voyage from "Aquilas" to Newcastle upon Tyne.
Viscount Lambton	United Kingdom	The brig ran aground at South Shields, County Durham. She was refloated and towed in to Sunderland, County Durham in a leaky condition.
Wonder	United Kingdom	The schooner was driven ashore in Gibraltar Bay.

== 28 March ==
List of shipwrecks: 28 March 1866
Ship	State	Description
Coke	United Kingdom	The sloop was driven ashore and wrecked at Filey, Yorkshire. Her crew survived. She was on a voyage from Hartlepool, County Durham to Wells-next-the-Sea, Norfolk.
Floating Cloud	United Kingdom	The ship ran aground on the Burbo Bank, in Liverpool Bay. She was refloated with assistance from the tug Triumph (United Kingdom).
Gleam	United Kingdom	The schooner was driven ashore at St. Margaret's Bay, Kent. She was on a voyage from Hartlepool, County Durham to Newhaven, Sussex. She was refloated and towed in to Dover, Kent by a tug.
Jane Jackson	United Kingdom	The schooner was driven ashore at Folkestone, Kent. She was on a voyage from Arbroath, Forfarshire to Plymouth, Devon. She was refloated and towed in to Dover.
Lizzie Fox	United Kingdom	The barque was driven ashore at Dungeness, Kent. She was on a voyage from London to Algoa Bay. She was refloated with the assistance of a tug.
Olive	United Kingdom	The schooner ran aground on the Leerbergen, in the Baltic Sea. She was on a voyage from Cullen, Moray to Stettin. She was refloated and taken in to Helsingør, Denmark.

== 29 March ==
List of shipwrecks: 29 March 1866
Ship	State	Description
Arago	United Kingdom	The steamship was wrecked on South Stack, Anglesey. All on board were rescued. She was on a voyage from Pernambuco, Brazil to Liverpool, Lancashire.
Blandina	United Kingdom	The ship ran aground on the Cockatoo Rocks, near Bassein, India. She was on a voyage from Bassein to Falmouth, Cornwall. She was refloated the next day and taken in to Bassein.
Enterprise	United Kingdom	The ship ran ashore near Bude, Cornwall with the loss of all hands. She was on a voyage from Cork to Llanelly, Glamorgan. She was driven further ashore and wrecked whilst an attempt was made to refloat her.
Griffin	(United Kingdom of Great Britain and Ireland) Jersey	The brigantine was driven ashore and wrecked on Flores Island, Azores. She was on a voyage from New Orleans, Louisiana, United States to Liverpool, Lancashire.
Jacoba	United Kingdom	The ship ran aground on the Shipwash Sand, in the North Sea off the coast of Suffolk. She was on a voyage from South Shields, County Durham to Singapore, Straits Settlements. She was refloated and taken in to Harwich, Essex.
Orient	United Kingdom	The steamship ran aground on Saltholm, Denmark. She was on a voyage from Leith, Lothian to Stettin.

== 30 March ==
List of shipwrecks: 30 March 1866
Ship	State	Description
Belga and Eleonora	Norway	The ship was abandoned in the North Sea. She was on a voyage from Christiania to Grangemouth, Stirlingshire, United Kingdom.
Briton's Queen	(United Kingdom of Great Britain and Ireland) Tasmania	The ship was wrecked on the Capricorn Reef. She was on a voyage from Port Denison to Brisbane, Queensland.
Maori	United Kingdom	The schooner was run into by the steamship Houghton (United Kingdom) at Montrose, Forfarshire. She caught fire when her cargo of quicklime got wet and was scuttled. She was on a voyage from Sunderland, County Durham to Montrose.
Queen	United Kingdom	The paddle steamer struck the Tings Rocks, in the Bristol Channel off Hartland Point, Devon and was holed. She was beached at Clovelly, Devon, where she subsequently broke her back and was a total loss. All on board survived. She was on a voyage from Bristol, Gloucestershire to Hayle, Cornwall.
Statesman	United Kingdom	The barque ran aground at Dungeness, Kent. She was on a voyage from Lisbon, Portugal to London. she was refloated and resumed her voyage.
Thomas Kiliam	United States	The barque was abandoned in the Atlantic Ocean. Her crew were rescued. She was on a voyage from Antwerp, Belgium to New York

== 31 March ==
List of shipwrecks: 31 March 1866
Ship	State	Description
Dorothea	Spain	Chincha Islands War: The polacca, a prize of Huáscar (Peruvian Navy) was run ashore and burnt at Rio de Janeiro, Empire of Brazil. She was on a voyage from Montevideo, Uruguay to Havana, Cuba.
Glyncorrwg	United Kingdom	The ship struck a sunken wreck and sank near Holyhead, Anglesey. Her crew were rescued. She was on a voyage from Bangor, Caernarfonshire to Portrush, County Antrim.
Grecian	United Kingdom	The steamship was driven ashore near Venice, Kingdom of Lombardy–Venetia. She was on a voyage from Trieste to Liverpool, Lancashire. She was refloated and towed in to Venice.

== Unknown date ==
List of shipwrecks: Unknown date in March 1866
Ship	State	Description
Agnes Kelly	United Kingdom	The ship was driven ashore on Jura. She was on a voyage from Liverpool, Lancashire to the Levant. She was refloated.
Alumina	United Kingdom	The ship ran aground in the "Cameroons River".
Australian	United Kingdom	The steamship ran aground on "Guy's Island", in the Persian Gulf. She was refloated and resumed her voyage.
Blackburn	United Kingdom	The ship foundered in the Pacific Ocean with the loss of all hands. She was on a voyage from Baker Island to Falmouth, Cornwall.
Claudia	United Kingdom	The brig sprang a leak and was beached at Cardiff, Glamorgan.
Elizabeth	United Kingdom	The ship was driven ashore and sank near Dumfries before 13 March.
Elizabeth Young	(United Kingdom of Great Britain and Ireland) Jersey	The ship was driven ashore at Málaga, Spain. Her crew survived. She was on a voyage from Newcastle upon Tyne, Northumberland to Motril, Spain.
Ernestine	Prussia	The brig was driven ashore at Mazatlán, Mexico before 11 March. Her crew survived.
Fairy	(United Kingdom of Great Britain and Ireland) Jersey	The schooner sank in Plymouth Sound.
Fusilier	None	The unregistered schooner was wrecked in the Derwent River.
Gertrude	United Kingdom	The ship was wrecked. She was on a voyage from Calcutta to Bombay, India.
Herald of the Morning	United Kingdom	The ship ran aground on the False Spit, off Boston, Massachusetts, United States. She was on a voyage from South Shields, County Durham to Boston. She was refloated and towed in to Boston.
Hound	United Kingdom	The barque was wrecked off "Tocondina", Brazil.
Jacobus	Kingdom of Hanover	The schooner was driven ashore on Hirsholmene, Denmark. She was on a voyage from Newcastle upon Tyne to Odense, Denmark. She was refloated and taken in to Fredrikshavn, Denmark, where she arrived on 31 March in a leaky condition.
John Moore	United Kingdom	The ship foundered off Cartagena, Spain. She was on a voyage from Almería, Spain to Newcastle upon Tyne.
Kestrel	United Kingdom	The ship ran aground at Lisbon, Portugal. She was on a voyage from Cardiff, Glamorgan to Lisbon. She was refloated and taken in to Lisbon in a leaky condition.
Knowsley	United Kingdom	The ship struck a sunken rock at "Guayacan", Chile. She was taken in to Valparaíso for repairs.
Leo	United Kingdom	The steamship foundered in the Bay of Biscay on or after 24 March with the loss of all hands. She was on her maiden voyage, from Newcastle upon Tyne to Barcelona, Spain.
Mandrine	(United Kingdom of Great Britain and Ireland) South Australia	The schooner was wrecked at Wilson's Promontory, New South Wales on or before 29 March. She was on a voyage from Adelaide to Shanghai, China.
Marie Marguerite	France	The ship capsized in the English Channel off the coast of Cornwall, United Kingdom. She was towed in to Falmouth on 30 March in a capsized condition.
Napoleon Canavero	Italy	The ship was abandoned by her crew, who had been overpowered by the coolies on board. They were rescued by Madeira (Hamburg). Napoleon Canavero was on a voyage from Hong Kong to Havana, Cuba.
Natchez	United States	The lighter sank in Mobile Bay.
Nymphen	United Kingdom	The brig was driven ashore at Blyth, Northumberland before 18 March. She was refloated on 21 March and taken in to Blyth.
Pioneer	(United Kingdom of Great Britain and Ireland) New South Wales	The schooner was wrecked on "Mercede Island" before 22 March.
Silver Star	United States	The ship was wrecked on the Mosquito Bay Reef. She was on a voyage from New York to Aux Cayes, Haiti.
Sparks	United Kingdom	The ship foundered before 8 March. A message in a bottle washed up at Demerara, British Guiana giving the news.
Three Brothers	United Kingdom	The schooner was driven ashore at Coatham, Yorkshire. She was refloated on 18 April with the assistance of two tugs.
Vellore	France	The ship was wrecked on Île Amsterdam. Her ten crew survived. She was on a voyage from Bordeaux, Gironde to Batavia, Netherlands East Indies.
Victory	(United Kingdom of Great Britain and Ireland) Victoria	The schooner foundered 30 nautical miles (56 km) off Port Phillip Heads before 30 March.
Vixen	United Kingdom	The schooner was abandoned off the Tuskar Rock on or before 7 February.
