= Nicolas-Charles Bochsa =

French harpist and composer (1789–1856)

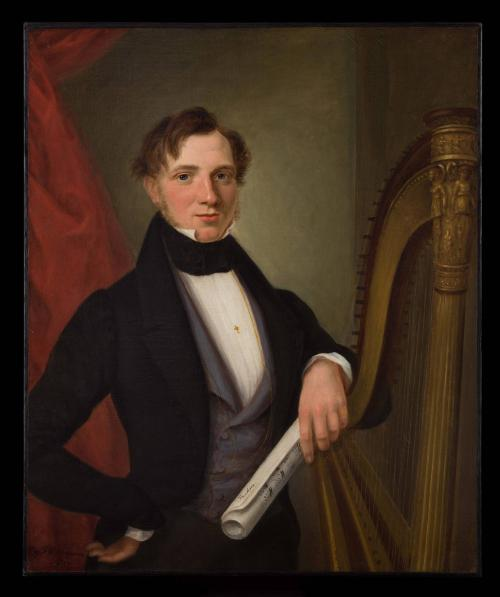
- Portrait by Peter Copmann, 1837
- Born: 9 August 1789; Montmédy, France
- Died: 6 January 1856 (aged 66); Sydney, Australia
- Occupations: Composer, harpist
- Spouse: Georgette Ducrest (m. 1815) (Note: Georgette Ducrest was the niece of Stéphanie Félicité, comtesse de Genlis.)
- Partner(s): Amy Wilson, (Note: Amy Wilson was the sister of the courtesan Harriette Wilson.) Anna Bishop
- Children: 2 from Georgette

Robert-Nicolas-Charles Bochsa (French pronunciation: [ʁɔbɛʁ nikɔla ʃaʁl bɔksa]; 9 August 1789 – 6 January 1856) was a French harpist and composer. His relationship with Anna Bishop was popularly thought to have inspired that of Svengali and Trilby in George du Maurier's 1894 novel Trilby.

== Life ==
The son of a Bohemian-born musician, Charles Bochsa, Bochsa was born in Montmédy, Meuse, France. (Note: An obituary, undoubtedly informed by his lover Anna Bishop, described him as "a native of Prague, but at an early age became celebrated in Paris".) He was able to play the flute and piano by the age of seven. In 1807, he went to study at the Paris Conservatoire, winning the first prize in harmony the following year. He was appointed harpist to the Imperial Orchestra of Napoleon in 1813, and began writing operas for the Opéra-Comique. However, in 1817 he became entangled in counterfeiting, fraud, and forgery, and fled to London to avoid prosecution. He was convicted in absentia, and sentenced to twelve years hard labour and a fine of 4,000 francs.

Safe from French law in London, he helped found the Royal Academy of Music in 1821, and became its secretary. He taught there, among others, the British harp virtuoso Elias Parish Alvars. When his criminal conviction was revealed in 1826, he was forced to resign. He then became musical director of the Kings Theatre, London.

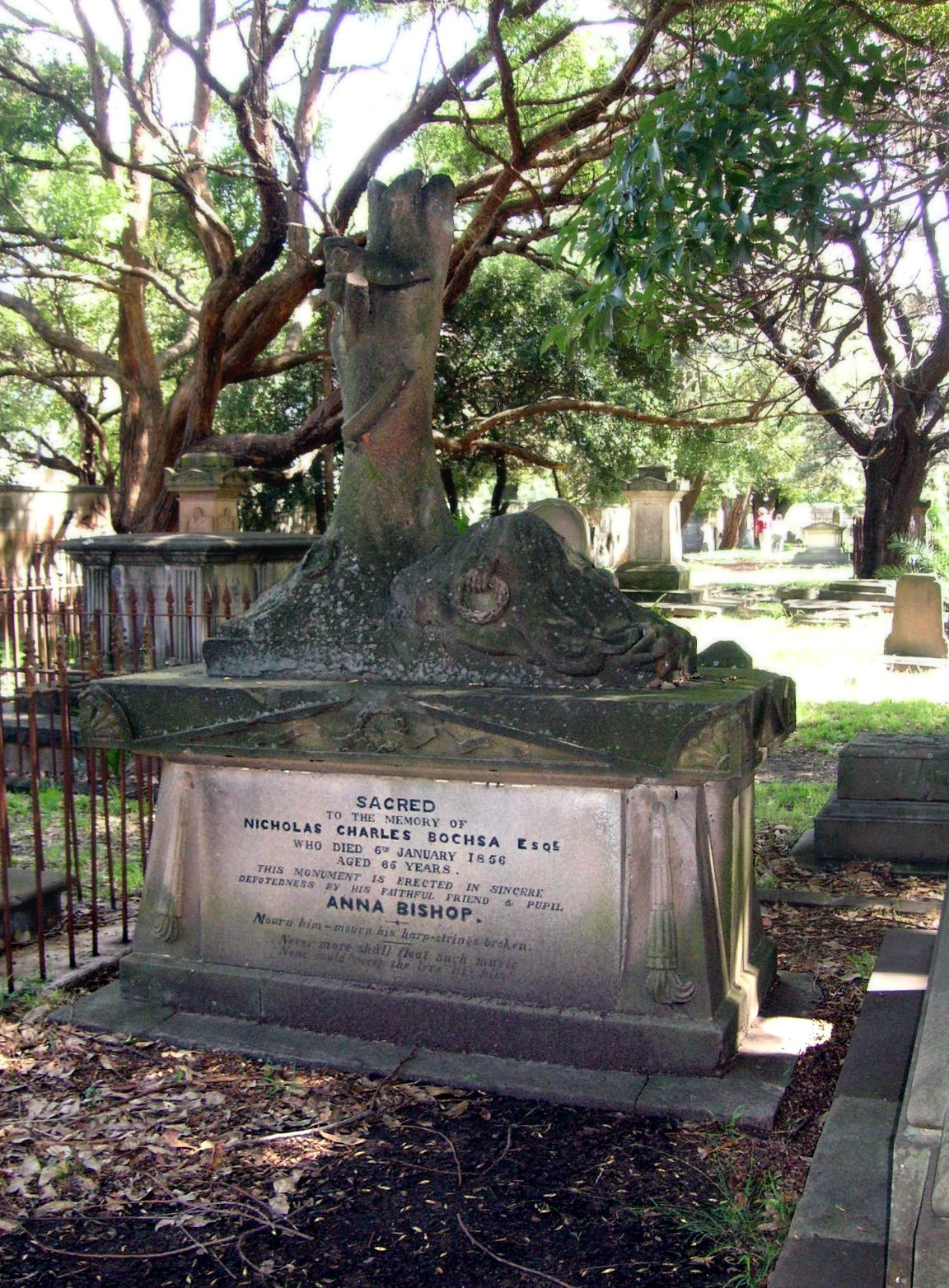
Bochsa's vandalised grave in Camperdown Cemetery, Sydney

In 1839, he became involved in another scandal when he ran off with the opera singer Anna Bishop, wife of the composer Henry Bishop. They performed together in North America and throughout Europe (except France). In Naples, Bochsa was appointed director of the opera house Teatro di San Carlo and stayed there for two years.

Bochsa arrived with Bishop in Sydney, Australia, at the time of the Victorian gold rush in December 1855, but they gave only one concert together before Bochsa died. Bishop was heartbroken, and commissioned an elaborate tomb for him in Camperdown Cemetery.

== Operas ==
- Le Retour de Trajan, ou, Rome triomphante
- Les Héritiers Michau, ou Le Moulin de Lieursain
- L'Héritier de Paimpol
- Le Roi et la ligue
- Les Noces de Gamache
- La Lettre de change (English: The Promissory Note; German: Der Wechselbrief)
- Un Mari pour étrennes

== Bibliography ==
- Michel Faul, Nicolas-Charles Bochsa, harpiste, compositeur, escroc (Éditions Delatour, 2003)
- Michel Faul, Les Tribulations mexicaines de Nicolas-Charles Bochsa, harpiste (Éditions Delatour, 2006)

== Notes and references ==
Notes
