= Trilby (novel) =

1894 novel by George du Maurier

- Cover of the first edition of the novel (1894)
- Author: George du Maurier
- Language: English
- Genre: Sensation novel, Gothic novel
- Publisher: Harper & Brothers, Osgood, McIlvaine & Co.
- Publication date: 1894
- Publication place: United States

Trilby is a sensation novel by George du Maurier and one of the most popular novels of its time. Published serially in Harper's New Monthly Magazine from January to August 1894, it was published in book form on 8 September 1894 and sold 200,000 copies in the United States alone. Trilby is set in the 1850s in an idyllic bohemian Paris. Though Trilby features the stories of two English artists and a Scottish artist, one of the most memorable characters is Svengali, a rogue, masterful musician and hypnotist.

Trilby, the novel's heroine, is a young orphan girl working in Paris as an artist's model and laundress; all the men in the novel are in love with her. The relationship between Trilby and Svengali forms only a small, though crucial, portion of the novel, which is mainly an evocation of a milieu.

Lucy Sante wrote that the novel had a "decisive influence on the stereotypical notion of bohemia" and that it "affected the habits of American youth, particularly young women, who derived from it the courage to call themselves artists and 'bachelor girls,' to smoke cigarettes and drink Chianti."

The novel has been adapted to the stage several times; one of these featured the lead actress wearing a distinctive short-brimmed hat with a sharp snap to the back of the brim. The hat became known as the trilby and went on to become a popular men's clothing item in the United Kingdom throughout various parts of the 20th century, subsequently gaining popularity elsewhere and seeing a resurgence in popularity in the early 1980s, when it was marketed to both men and women to capitalise on a retro fashion trend.

== Harper's New Monthly Magazine ==
=== Eight installments ===
The work was published in eight installments, in Harper's New Monthly Magazine from January 1894 to August 1894. The eight separate instalments were published as an entire work in a volume that was released on 8 September 1894.

==== Whistler's lawsuit ====
The extraordinary initial sales of the book — almost 100,000 copies were sold in the first two months— were, no doubt, greatly enhanced by the pre-publication controversy created when the eminent artist, James McNeill Whistler, initiated legal action against du Maurier and Harper Brothers, demanding that all textual and visual references to "Joe Sibley", the pompous and eccentric "idle apprentice" (obviously based upon Whistler), be removed from the proposed book.

As a consequence of Whistler's action, Harper Brothers removed all of the references in question from the book prior to its publication and, also, removed them from its reprints of the March 1894 issue. On 2 December 1894, the Chicago Sunday Tribune gave details of Whistler's protests, and published a side-by-side comparison of the original text and illustrations and those of the altered published volume.

== Plot summary ==
Three British art students in Paris (Talbot Wynne, called "Taffy", a distant heir to a baronetcy; Sandy McAlister, the Laird of Cockpen; and William Bagot, alias "Little Billee") meet musicians Svengali and Gecko and the artist's model and laundress Trilby O'Ferrall. Trilby is cheerful, kind-hearted, bohemian, and tone-deaf: "Svengali would test her ear, as he called it, and strike the C in the middle and then the F just above, and ask which was higher; and she would declare they were both the same". To the bemusement of the other characters, Trilby is unable to sing "Ben Bolt" in tune.

The Britons and Trilby become friends. Svengali tries to persuade Trilby to let him train her voice, but she finds him repulsive and even frightening. She and Little Billee fall in love but his scandalized relatives get her to promise to leave him. She leaves Paris with her little brother, who later dies of scarlet fever. Trilby then falls under Svengali's influence. He hypnotises her and transforms her into a diva, La Svengali. Under his spell, Trilby becomes a talented singer, performing always in an amnesiac trance. Five years later, Little Billee is a famous painter. He, the Laird and Taffy recognise Trilby as she performs at a concert. Trilby sings beautifully but does not appear to be in good health.

Shortly before another performance, Gecko suddenly turns on Svengali and slashes him with a penknife. At the concert, Svengali is stricken by a heart attack and is unable to induce the trance. Trilby is unable to sing in tune and is subjected to "laughter, hoots, hisses, cat-calls, cock-crows". Not having been hypnotised, she is baffled and, though she can remember living and travelling with Svengali, cannot remember anything of her singing career. Suddenly an audience member yells:

"Oh, ye're Henglish, har yer? Why don't yer sing as yer ought to sing—yer've got voice enough, any'ow! Why don't yer sing in tune?" she cries "I didn't want to sing at all—I only sang because I was asked to sing—that gentleman asked—that French gentleman with the white waistcoat! I won't sing another note!"

As she leaves the stage, Svengali dies. Trilby is stricken with a nervous affliction. Despite the efforts of her friends, she dies some weeks later—staring at a picture of Svengali. Little Billee is devastated and dies shortly afterwards. Some years later, Taffy, who has married Little Billee's sister, meets Gecko again and learns how Svengali had hypnotised Trilby and damaged her health in the process. Gecko reveals that he had tried to kill Svengali because he could not bear to see Trilby hurt during their awful rehearsals.

== Inspiration ==
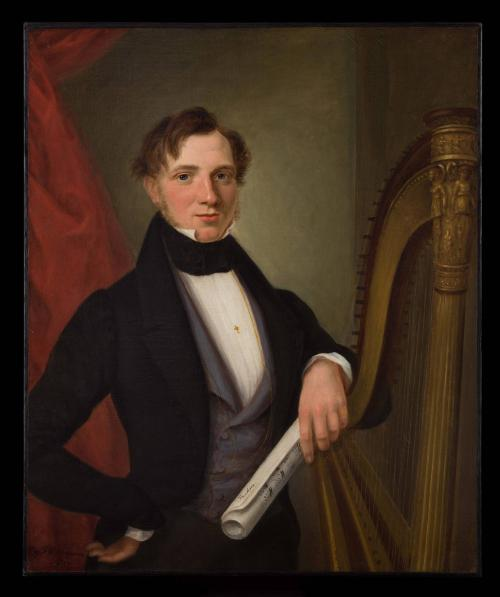
Nicolas-Charles Bochsa, portrait by Peter Copmann, 1837

It was popularly believed that the hypnotic control Svengali has over Trilby was modelled after the relationship between the French harpist and composer Nicolas-Charles Bochsa and the English operatic soprano Anna Bishop. Anna Bishop had left her husband Henry Bishop (later Sir Henry), the composer of "Home! Sweet Home!", for Bochsa. Both men were over 20 years older than Anna. Bochsa became her manager as well as her lover. She sang in many opera houses on their extensive travels throughout Europe (particularly in Naples, Italy), North America and Sydney, where Bochsa died suddenly in 1856 and is buried. Sir Henry Bishop had died the previous year. Anna Bishop later remarried, continued travelling and singing professionally into her seventies, and died in New York City. The character of Little Billee is a reference to an eponymous ballad by William Makepeace Thackeray.

== Reception ==
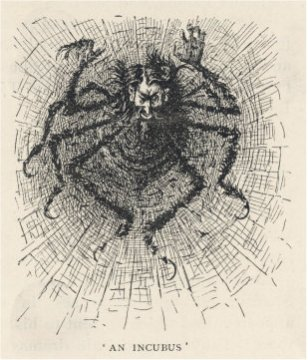
Svengali as a spider in his web, illustration by George du Maurier, 1895

The late nineteenth-century novelist George Gissing read the "notorious" novel in May 1896 with "scant satisfaction". Trilby inspired Gaston Leroux's novel The Phantom of the Opera (1910) in part. It was also known for introducing the phrase "Svengali", a term referring to a man with dominating powers over a (generally female) protégée.

=== Trilby-Mania ===
Trilby was one of the most popular books of the Victorian era. As a result, the novel had large influence on Victorian popular culture, creating a craze that was referred to as "Trilby-Mania" or the "Trilbyana". The book's popularity caused footwear inspired by the title character to grow in popularity, and footreading became a fad. Additionally, foot-shaped ice cream became popular due to the book. The word "trilby" became a jocular slang term to refer to a foot, but would later be used to describe a type of hat inspired by an adaptation of the novel.

=== Antisemitism ===
Trilby has been criticized for its depiction of its Jewish antagonist, Svengali. Most notably, George Orwell wrote that the novel is overtly antisemitic, albeit of a pre-Nazi "traditional" type. Orwell believed that du Maurier attributes all of Svengali's villainous and rapacious qualities to his Jewishness. Nonetheless, Orwell viewed Trilby as "justly popular" and an example of the "'good bad' literature" produced prior to the First World War.

== Adaptations and references to the novel ==
The novel was adapted into a long-running play, Trilby, starring Sir Herbert Beerbohm Tree as Svengali, first presented in 1895 in London. In New York Wilton Lackaye originated the role of Svengali and Virginia Harned played the title role. The play was revived many times, including at the Apollo Theatre in the 1920s. The play was so popular that it was travestied, including as A Model Trilby; or, A Day or Two After Du Maurier by Charles H. E. Brookfield and William Yardley, with music by Meyer Lutz, at the Opera Comique, produced by the retired Nellie Farren.

The novel has also been adapted to film numerous times:

- Trilby, (1912) an Austrian silent film starring Paul Askonas and Elsa Galafrés, directed by Anton Kolm, Luise Kolm, Jacob Fleck, and Claudius Veltée.
- Trilby (1914), a British silent film starring Viva Birkett and Herbert Beerbohm Tree, directed by Harold M. Shaw
- Trilby (1915), an American silent film starring Clara Kimball Young and Wilton Lackaye, directed by Maurice Tourneur
- Trilby (1923), an American silent film starring Andree Lafayette, Arthur Edmund Carewe, and Creighton Hale
- Svengali (1927), a German silent film starring Paul Wegener and Anita Dorris
- Svengali (1931), a Warner Brothers release with John Barrymore and Marian Marsh
- Svengali (1954), a British film starring Donald Wolfit and Hildegard Knef
- Svengali (1983), a TV movie starring Peter O'Toole and Jodie Foster

A musical adaptation by Frank Wildhorn, entitled Svengali, was staged twice in 1991.

The Trilby story was parodied in Mighty Mouse cartoons in the 1940s that featured Pearl Pureheart and Oil Can Harry. Included was a performance of "Ben Bolt".

The Trilby story was also parodied in the very popular and even slightly risque BBC Home Service comedy program 'Round the Horne'. The episode in question was first broadcast on 19th March 1967 - being part of the second series of the program.

A fandom developed around the Trilby character, called Trilbyana, which was criticised in Belsham's Essays. Trilby is referenced several times in William Gaddis' novel JR, wherein Edward Bast the protagonist becomes a mirror of Little Billee, a prominent artist in Trilby.

An inside look at Trilby and Henry James's friendship with du Maurier (Kiki) can be found in David Lodge's novel Author, Author (2004).

Australian composer Thomas Bulch writing under the pen name Charles Le Thierre published a Trilby waltz dedication, featuring Trilby posing for an artist on the cover in the same year as Sydney productions of the stage play.

The celebrated Polish World War II Special Operations Executive agent Krystyna Skarbek, a.k.a. Christine Granville, used Svengali as a metaphor when saying of her second husband, Jerzy Giżycki, "He was my Svengali for so many years that he would never believe that I could ever leave him for good".

In 2011 and 2012, the British illusionist Derren Brown performed a stage show called Svengali in which he makes reference to the character throughout the show.

== See also ==
- Trilbyana – Fashion for things based on the story Trilby
- Foot fetishism – Sexual fascination with feet

== General and cited references ==
- Brown, Thomas Allston. A History of the New York Stage from the First Performance in 1732 to 1901, New York: Dodd, Mead and Company, 1902.
- Davison, Neil R. "'The Jew' as Homme/Femme-Fatale: Jewish (Art)ifice, "Trilby," and Dreyfus." Jewish Social Studies 8 (Winter–Spring 2002): 73–111. Accessed through JStor on 4 September 2009.
- Masson, Madeleine, Christine: A Search for Christine Granville, G.M., O.B.E., Croix de Guerre, with a Foreword by Francis Cammaerts, D.S.O., Légion d'Honneur, Croix de Guerre, US Medal of Freedom, London, Hamish Hamilton, 1975; republished by Virago, 2005.
- McNaught, W. "George du Maurier and Trilby." The Musical Times 81 (November 1940): 435–438. Accessed through JStor on 4 September 2009.
- Parry, Albert. Garrets and Pretenders: Bohemian Life in America from Poe to Kerouac. New York: Covici-Friede, 1933.
- Taylor, Jonathan. "The Music Master and 'the Jew' in Victorian Writing: Thomas Carlyle, Richard Wagner, George Eliot and George Du Maurier." In The Idea of Music in Victorian Fiction. Edited by Sophie Fuller and Nicky Losseff. Aldershot, Hants, England: Ashgate, 2004.
- Weliver, Phyllis. "Music, crowd control and the female performer in Trilby." In The Idea of Music in Victorian Fiction. Edited by Sophie Fuller and Nicky Losseff. Aldershot, Hants, England: Ashgate, 2004.
- Weliver, Phyllis. Women Musicians in Victorian Fiction, 1860–1900. Aldershot, Hants, England: Ashgate, 2000.
