= Gandhi Memorial International Foundation =

- Type: Non-profit
- Founded: Yogesh K. Gandhi
- Defunct: 1999
- Headquarters: Orinda, California
- Products: Mahatma Gandhi Humanitarian Award

Gandhi Memorial International Foundation, also known as the Mahatma Gandhi International Foundation, was a controversial non-profit organization run by Yogesh K. Gandhi, born Yogesh Kathari, who claims to be related to Mahatma Gandhi. However, an immediate descendant of Mahatma Gandhi, publicly stated that Yogesh K. Gandhi was a "scam artist", and "interested primarily in enriching himself." Yogesh Gandhi described the organization as dedicated to "social betterment through nonviolence." The organization gave out the "Mahatma Gandhi Humanitarian Award".

The organization's business dealings were investigated by the United States Senate, in March 1998. Mother Jones referred to the organization as: "a shadowy non-profit enterprise devoted in principle to 'promoting the philosophy of non-violence'." On March 8, 1999, Yogesh Gandhi was charged by the United States Department of Justice with "tax evasion, mail and wire fraud and perjury" for dealings related to the Gandhi Memorial International Foundation. He had previously been indicted by the Justice Department's Campaign Financing Task Force in August 1998. In 1999, Yogesh Gandhi entered a guilty plea to the charges of mail fraud, tax evasion and violating federal election law over his contributions involving the Gandhi Memorial International Foundation and the Democratic National Committee in 1996. The Foundation was reported to have ceased its activities in 1999.

== Gives out "awards" ==
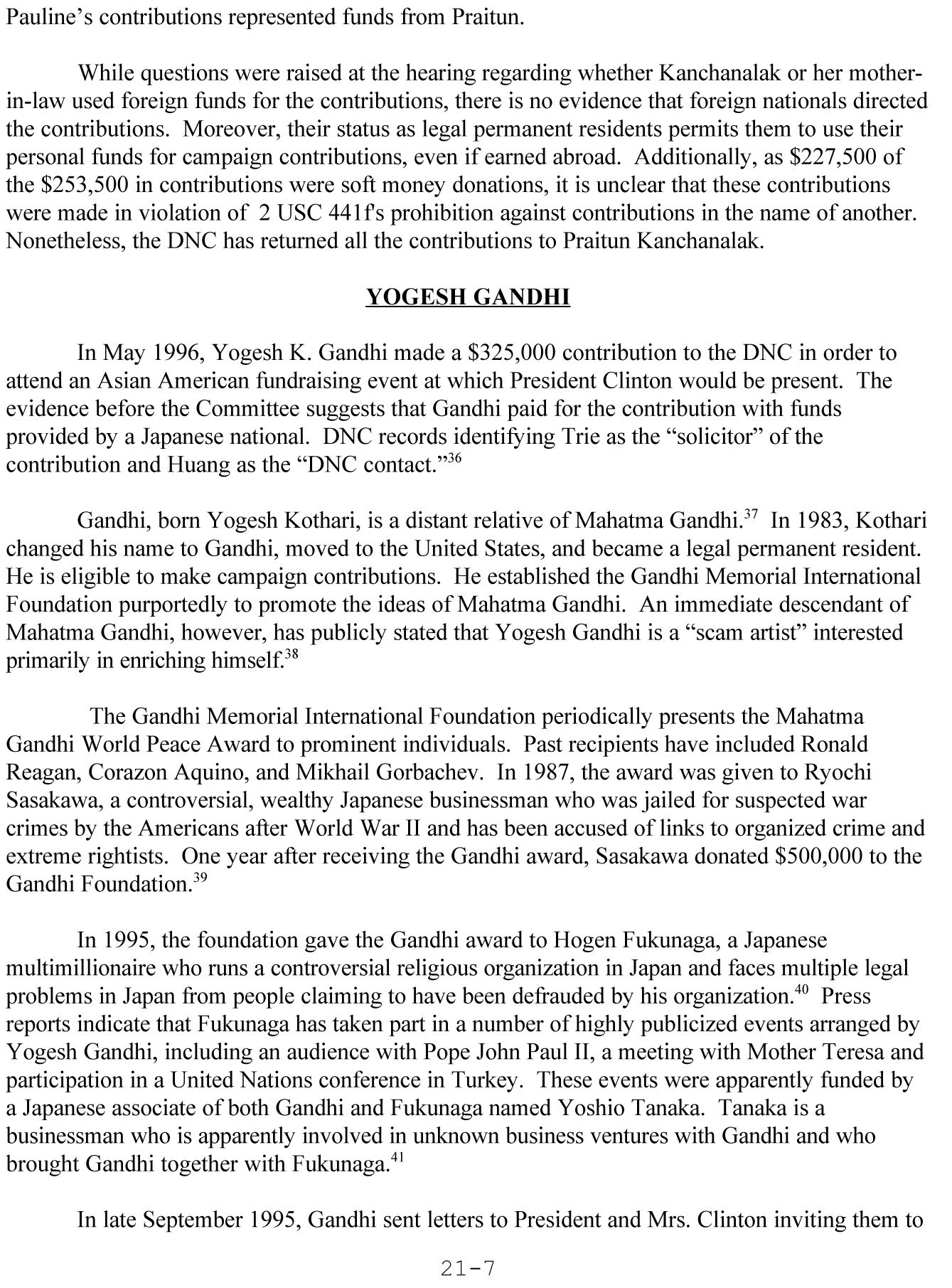
Excerpt, United States Senate Investigation, "Yogesh Gandhi", 1998.

Yogesh Gandhi was charged with mail fraud by the United States Department of Justice. Prior to the charges, Gandhi had presented Bill Clinton with the "Gandhi Peace Award" accompanied by a bust of Mohandas Gandhi, and had his picture taken with the president.

In 1987, Gandhi gave an award to Ryochi Sasakawa, an individual the United States Senate investigation referred to as "a controversial, wealthy Japanese businessman who was jailed by the Americans after World War II for suspected war crimes and has been accused of links to organized crime and extreme rightists." A year after Sasakawa received the Gandhi award from Yogesh Gandhi, Sasakawa donated $500,000 to the Gandhi Memorial International Foundation.

In 1988 the Gandhi Memorial International Foundation gave Werner Erhard, Joan Baez, Shirley Temple Black, and David Packard its "Mahatma Gandhi Humanitarian Award". This award was also given in 1995 to Hogen Fukunaga, an individual that a United States Senate investigation described as "a Japanese multimillionaire who runs a controversial religious organization in Japan and faces multiple legal problems in Japan from people claiming to have been defrauded by his organization." According to SF Weekly: "Tanaka, a Japanese health-food magnate, would channel money Fukunaga had raised through his huge Japanese cult following to Yogesh Gandhi, who would use his phony Gandhi Memorial Foundation to bribe world leaders, who would then help elevate Fukunaga's stature."

== DNC returns donation ==
CNN reported that Yogesh Gandhi used funds solicited for his Gandhi Memorial International Foundation, in order to pay off his own personal debts. In 1996, the Democratic National Committee had to give back $325,000 to Yogesh Gandhi, because they could not verify that he was the source of the donations. Gandhi refused to supply proof of the money's origins, and maintained that it had come from his own personal sources. The contribution had been the single largest received by the Democratic Party in 1996. An investigation by the United States Senate determined that these funds initially came from a Japanese national. The donation had originally been solicited from Yogesh Gandhi by Democratic Party fund-raiser Charles Yah Lin Trie.

== Forged accounts ==
Donald Shimer was a past executive director for the organization from 1987 to 1992. Shimer resigned when he was denied credit while attempting to use his personal American Express credit card, in May 1996. Shimer later learned that corporate accounts had been opened in his name in 1995 by Yogesh Gandhi, who Shimer believes had forged his signature. Yogesh Gandhi testified that he was not a United States citizen, had no financial assets in the country, and was living off his brother's credit. Mother Jones reported that the foundation "hadn't filed the required tax returns for years."

== Defunct ==
In 1999, the Foundation was reported to have ceased its activities.

== See also ==
- 1996 United States campaign finance controversy
- Campaign finance
- Democratic National Committee
- Money laundering
- 1996 United States presidential election
