= Trilbyana =

Fashion for things based on the story Trilby

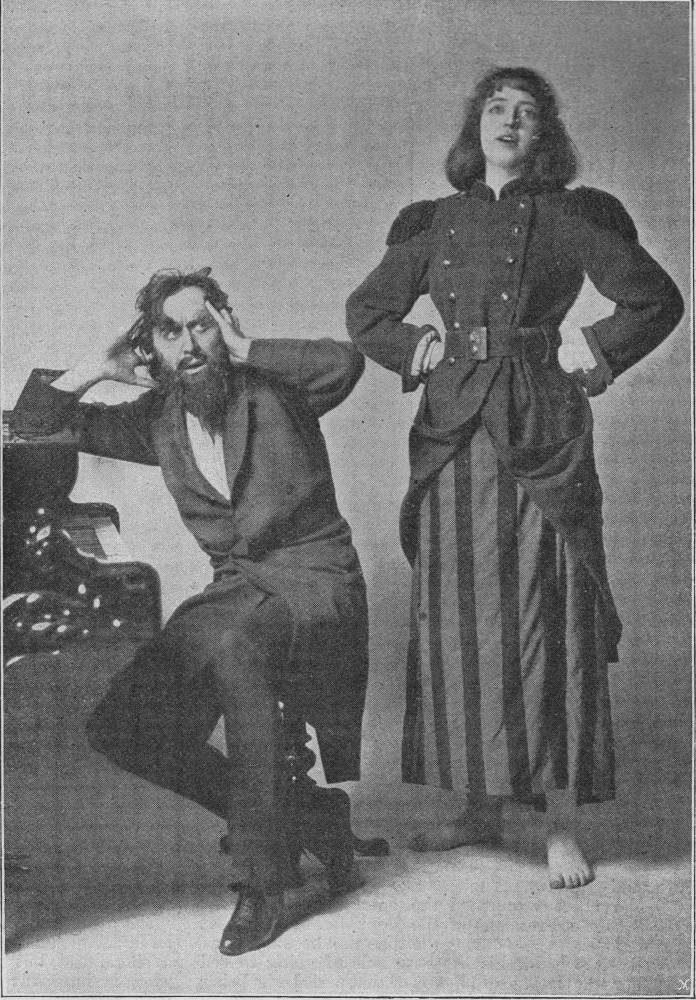
Svengali and Trilby in the London theatrical production of 1895

Trilbyana or Trilby-Mania was the fashion for things based on the story Trilby by George du Maurier. This was especially popular during the 1890s. The works included burlesques, cartoons, movies, parodies, plays, sketches and tableaux.

Published in 1894 by George du Maurier, the novel Trilby is about the life of fictional artist's model Trilby O'Ferrall. The story details her life, appearance, interactions with others, her singing voice, and how she gains the love of three artists in Paris. The story gained immense popularity in the United States at the turn of the 20th century.

== Trilby Boom ==
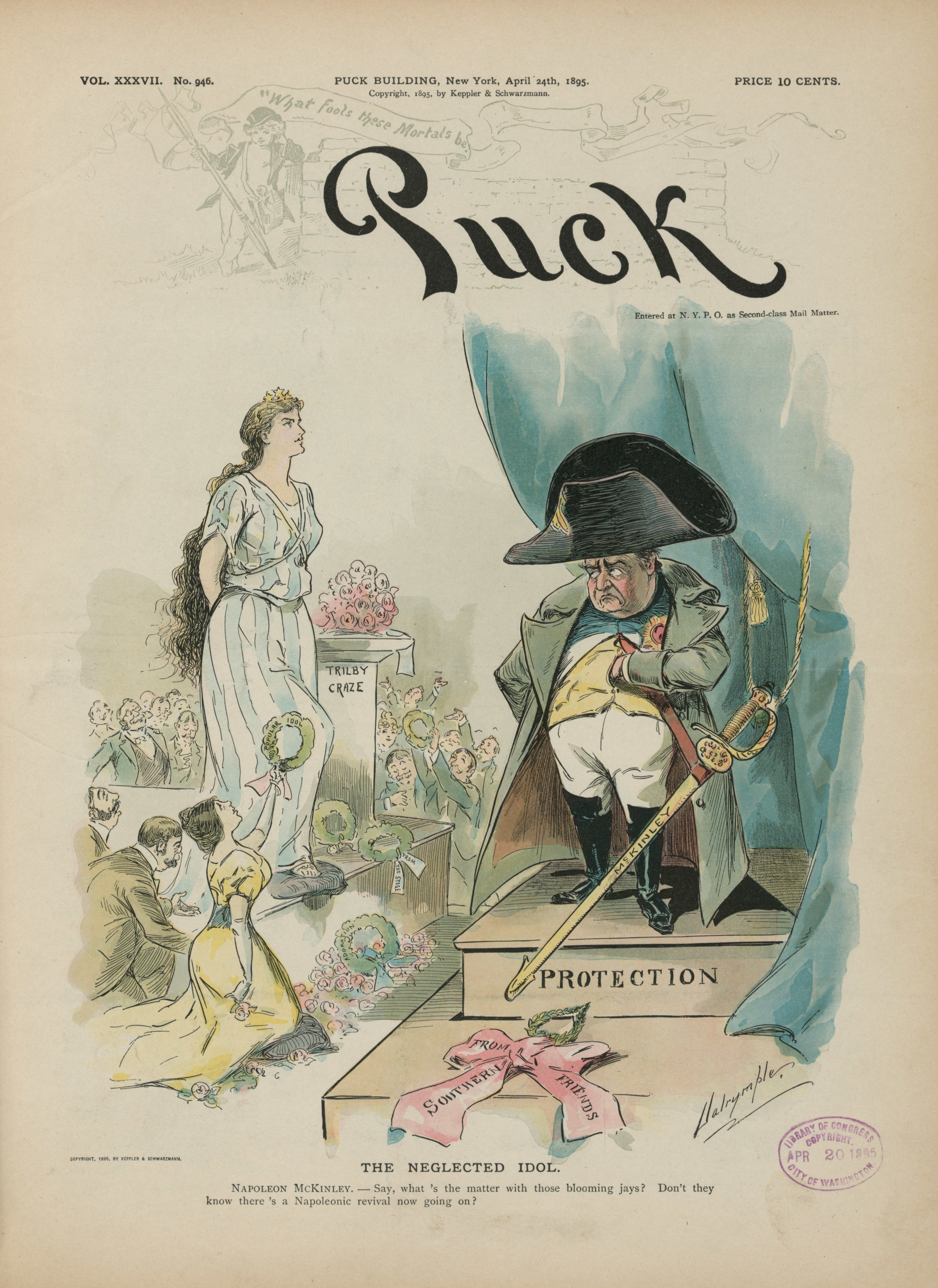
1895 cartoon depicts William McKinley as jealous that the "Trilby Craze" distracts public attention away from himself.

New technologies in printing and distribution led to widespread reading across the United States in the 19th century. Illustrated books were extremely popular forms of entertainment.

Du Maurier's novel sold astonishingly well. Harpers Weekly serialized the story and it ran for eight months before being published as a novel in September of 1894. The novel's popularity led to a "Trilby Boom" in America. The novel sold over one hundred thousand copies with in the first few months of publishing.

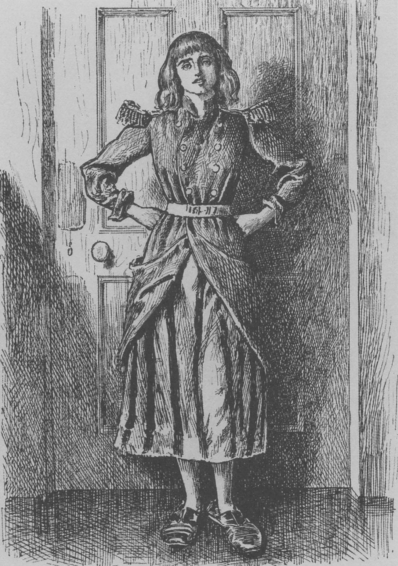
George du Maurier, "Wistful and Sweet", illustration for Trilby. General Research Division; The New York Public Library; Astor, Lenox and Tilden Foundations

Harper's Weekly purchased the full rights to the book, allowing them to pay royalties to the author and receive a larger profit. In 1895 a second edition of the novel was published, one with large reproductions of paper sketches created by du Maurier. The images were so popular an exhibition was held to display them. According to Joseph Benson Gilder's Trilbyana, the drawings were originally purchased to be recreated for the book then placed on exhibition. Benson Gilder, in his review of the fad, includes a short interview regarding the value of the drawings in the novel. The drawings were valued at about $50 apiece. The total set of drawings was $6,000.

The popularity of the pictures and the story resulted in many companies reproducing of the images to create new projects, causing Harpers Weekly to fight many cases about copyright infringement.

== Trilby in theater ==
One of the most popular uses of Trilby was in theater. Many different playhouses and troupes put on plays about Trilby, including reproductions of the novel and satire.

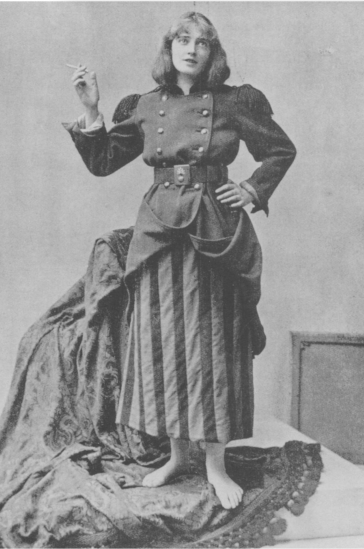
Miss Dorothea Baird as Trilby, Photograph from the Haymarket Theatre production of Trilby. General Research Division; The New York Public Library; Astor, Lenox and Tilden Foundations

In 1895 the Garden Theater in New York held a showing of Mr. Paul M. Potter's dramatized version of Trilby. The show was so popular people were turned away from the full playhouse.

Actress Miss Dorothea Baird was skyrocketed to fame because of her role as Trilby. She was celebrated mainly for her feet. In 1895 an American newspaper published an article about the "exact size of the foot of Miss Dorothy Baird…. A perfect Trilby foot." An outline of Baird's foot was included; the caption extolled the greatness of her feet. The play ran for many years with Baird as the lead.

Parodies were created by popular American artists. John Sloan's (1871–1951) performance in the parody Twilbe with artist Frank Walter Taylor (1874–1921) depicts both men dressed as women while posing for the camera. This burlesque parody echoed Trilby's affinity for cross-dressing in the novel. G. W. Dillingham a publishing house released, Drilby Re-versed, written by Leopold Jordan, an illustrated parody of du Maurier's original story. A skit titled Billtry by Mary Kyle Dallas was published and sold as well.

Trilby was an extremely popular novel that integrated itself into popular culture of the United States; being expressed in toys, foods, and many other items aside from theater.

== Commercial success ==
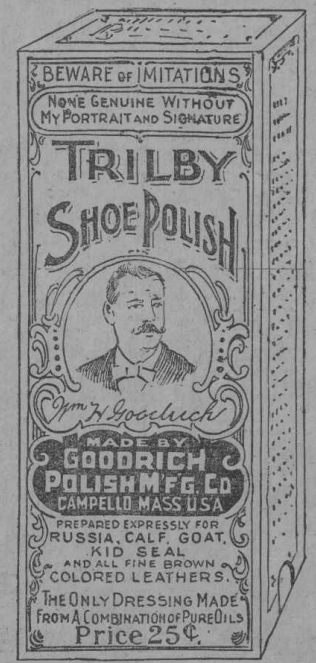
“Trilby Shoe Polish” New York journal and advertiser. (New York, NY), Mar. 26 1899.

Trilby was introduced into aspects of daily life as well as entertainment. Trilby parties were held in private estates, one party detailed by Jenkins was an all-male party that consisted of sad songs and readings about history and hypnotism respectively. There were ice cream bars shaped like feet and even a Trilby sausage. " There were even shoe stores in Southern Virginia selling Trilby branded shoe polish. Other products include fashionable clothing similar to what Trilby wore, jewelry, hearth brushes, dolls and other toys. Harper & Bros. produced many toys and costumes that attributed to the popularization of Trilby.

A 1915 article, The Day of Trilybisms, reflects on the Trilbyana product production. The other products that were developed with during the phase including cufflinks, gumdrops, chocolate, ice-cream sundaes with nuts, scarf pins, and pins of golden feet.

== Living Trilbyana ==
The integration of Trilby into daily life led to many men and women changing their lifestyles and style of dress to match the story. This caused many discussions about the morals of the main characters and social propriety. Gilder Benson's reflection on the novel includes a small conversation between two women regarding the morals of Trilby.

The two young women in the conversation are far removed from the popular playhouses in New York, as they live in Indiana, but have read the novel. Though they acknowledge the negative opinions about the story they find no fault in it.

Trilby also practices cross dressing throughout the novel. When she is first introduced to the story, she is wearing a men’s military coat over a dress. Trilby’s cross-dressing allowed her to be regarded as an icon of popular culture. This popularity of Trilby's style of dress led young women to also wear military coats over dresses to events.

The story of Trilby also ignited a wide range of interest in artists models across the United States. Many articles about models were titled using terms like "real life Trilby." Many models were unhappy with the attention. An 1895 Wichita Daily Eagle article proved that many professional models were unhappy with the limelight caused by Trilby and began to withdraw from the profession or decline certain poses. One model Miss Arabella Gold left the profession altogether due to this fad.

Religious figures also spoke against Trilby and Trilbyana. Rev. H. M. Sanders denounced popular culture stating plays had become immoral and an inappropriate form of entertainment. The article also notes that the theatrical production was also held in at least one church, another form of improper conduct according to the Rev, H. M. Sanders.
