= Anna Bishop =

English operatic soprano (1810–1884)

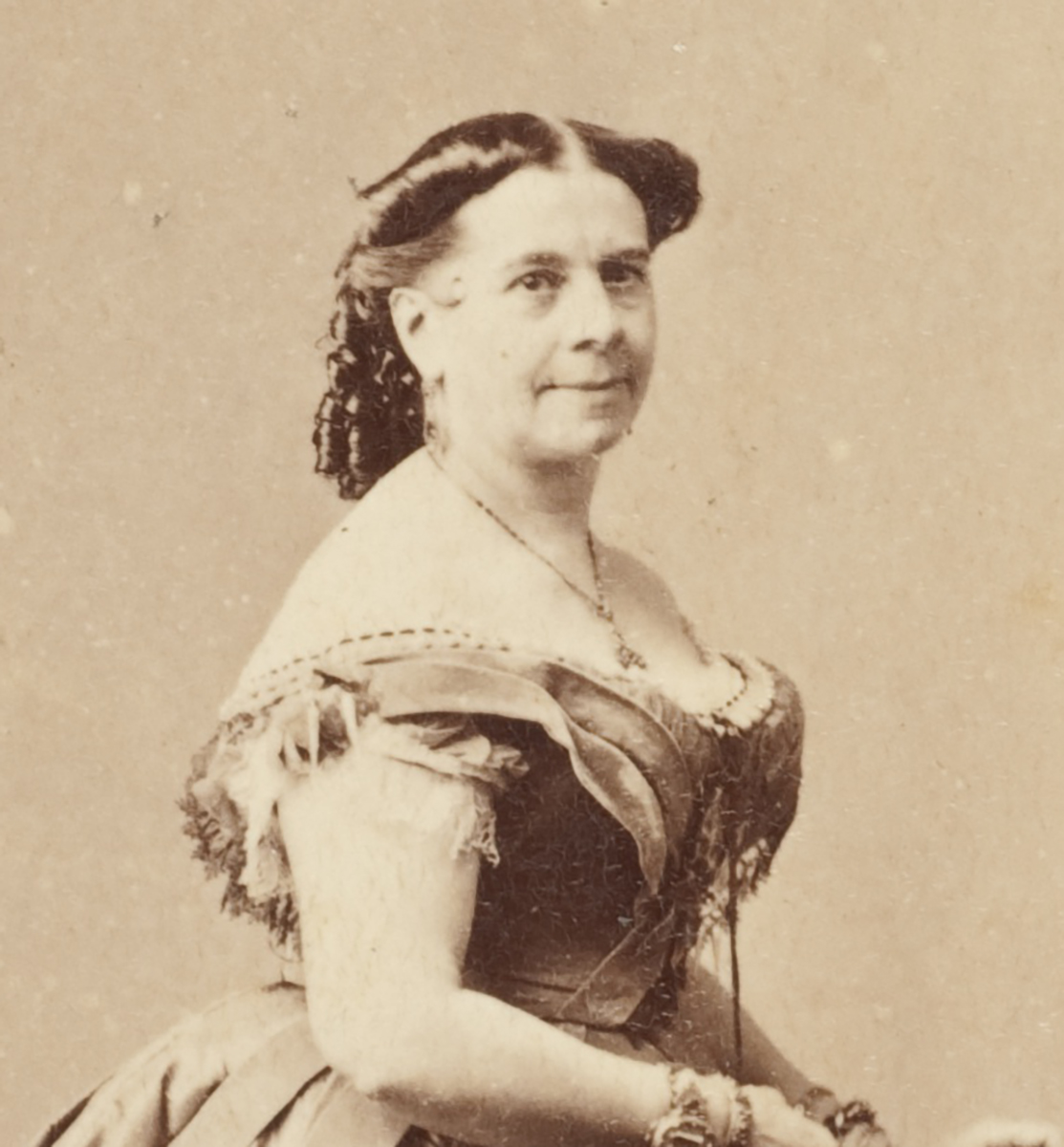
- Bishop in 1868
- Born: Ann Rivière; 9 January 1810; London, England
- Died: 18 March 1884 (aged 74); New York City, U.S.
- Education: Royal Academy of Music
- Occupation: Operatic soprano
- Spouses: Henry Bishop (m. 1831); Martin Schulz (m. 1858)
- Children: 3

Anna, Lady Bishop (9 January 1810 – 18 March 1884) was an English operatic soprano. She sang in many countries and was believed to be the most widely travelled singer of the 19th century. She was married to the composer Henry Bishop but abandoned him for the French harpist, composer and entrepreneur Nicolas-Charles Bochsa.

== Biography ==
Ann Rivière was born in London, England, daughter of a singing master. Her father was descended from a Huguenot family that had fled to England in the 17th century. She studied piano under Ignaz Moscheles, and then studied voice at the Royal Academy of Music under Henry Bishop. She made her debut at the Ancient Concerts in London in April 1831. Bishop's wife Sarah (née Lyon) died in June 1831, and Ann Rivière married him a month later, on 9 July; she was 21 and he 44. She was thereafter known professionally as Anna Bishop. They had three children: Rose (born 4 February 1833) and twins Augustus and Johanna (born 9 November 1837).

Bishop sang at the Royal Philharmonic Society and many other venues. Her voice was soprano, said to be of brilliant quality. On 28 March 1834, she was the principal soprano in the first English performance of Cherubini's Requiem in C. In 1838 she participated in the chorus at the Coronation of Queen Victoria. In 1839 she appeared at Her Majesty's Theatre in London, where Italian arias were performed in costume as "Dramatic Concerts", alongside the singers Giulia Grisi, Manuel Garcia, Fanny Tacchinardi Persiani, Giovanni Battista Rubini, Antonio Tamburini, Pauline Viardot and Luigi Lablache; and the pianists Sigismond Thalberg and Theodor Döhler.

That year she toured the provinces, Scotland and Ireland with the French harpist Nicolas-Charles Bochsa, who had played for Napoleon I; shortly after their return to London, she abandoned her husband and in August took up with Bochsa, who was also 20 years her senior. This was a great scandal for its time and much was written about it in the press. Bochsa became her manager and they toured in Sweden, Denmark, Russia, Hungary, Germany, Austria and other places in Europe. They always avoided France, where Bochsa was wanted on a charge of forgery. She sang in private before the Queen of Denmark. They continued their travels together, venturing overseas to Ireland, Australia, and North and South America. In 1853, theirs was among the first important visits by foreign artists to Ottawa, Canada.

Bishop built a reputation as one of the finest operatic sopranos of her day. Her voice was sometimes compared to a flute. She had her greatest successes in operas by Rossini and Donizetti at the Teatro di San Carlo in Naples, where she became prima donna assoluta in 1843. She appeared there 327 times in 24 operas. She created Rosalie in Mercadante's Il Vascello di Gama, at Naples on 6 March 1845. In New York, she competed with Jenny Lind and Adelina Patti. On 1 November 1852, in New York she sang in the United States premiere of Flotow's Martha.

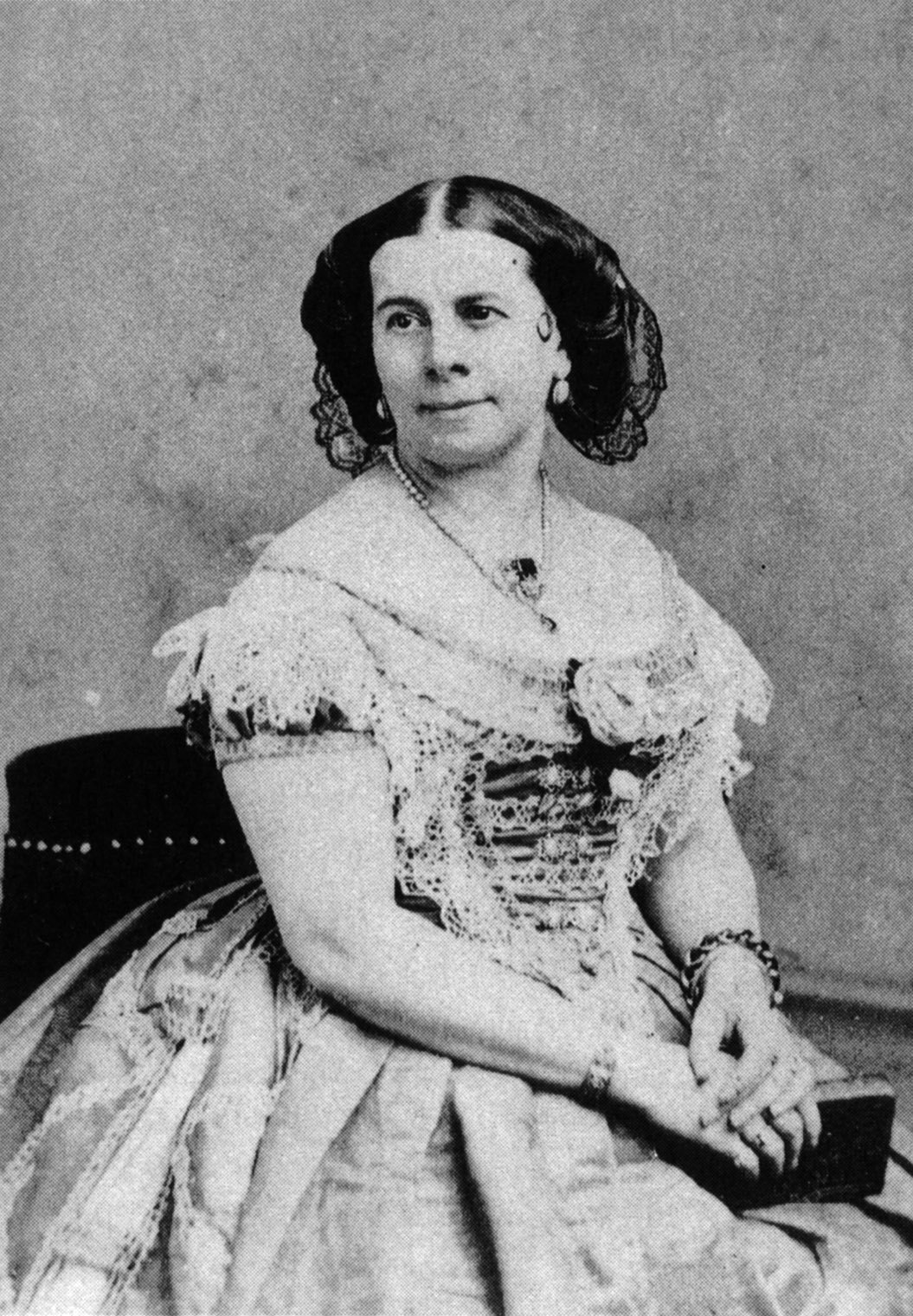
Bishop, c. 1860

On 6 January 1856, three weeks after Bishop and Bochsa arrived in Sydney, Australia, and having given only one concert together there, Bochsa died. She buried him at Camperdown Cemetery there, employing a choir and orchestra for the procession and burial, and creating in his honour the most ornate monument in the cemetery, with a statue of herself weeping disconsolately. The mourning figure was later vandalised.

She completed her Australian tour, then returned to South America (Chile, Argentina, Brazil). Her husband was knighted as Sir Henry Bishop, making Anna formally Lady Bishop, despite their estrangement. He died in 1855, having never agreed to a divorce. In 1858, in New York she married Martin Schulz, a diamond merchant. She appeared in England again, the previous scandal having been forgotten; she gave a farewell concert on 17 August 1859. She also gave a royal command performance for Queen Victoria.

She then resumed travelling throughout the Americas. On 4 March 1866 en route from San Francisco to China, on the first leg of a world tour, her ship the Libelle was wrecked on Wake Island, at that time an uncharted coral atoll, and she and Schulz and the rest of her party were stranded there for three weeks. All her costumes, jewellery and music were lost. They finally set out in two rowboats for Guam, a 14-day journey; the boat containing Bishop and her husband made it to safety, but the other boat containing the ship's captain and some crew was lost at sea. After a period of recovery, she resumed her world tour, singing in the Philippines, Hong Kong, Singapore, India, Ceylon, New Zealand, and Australia and London once again, before returning to New York.

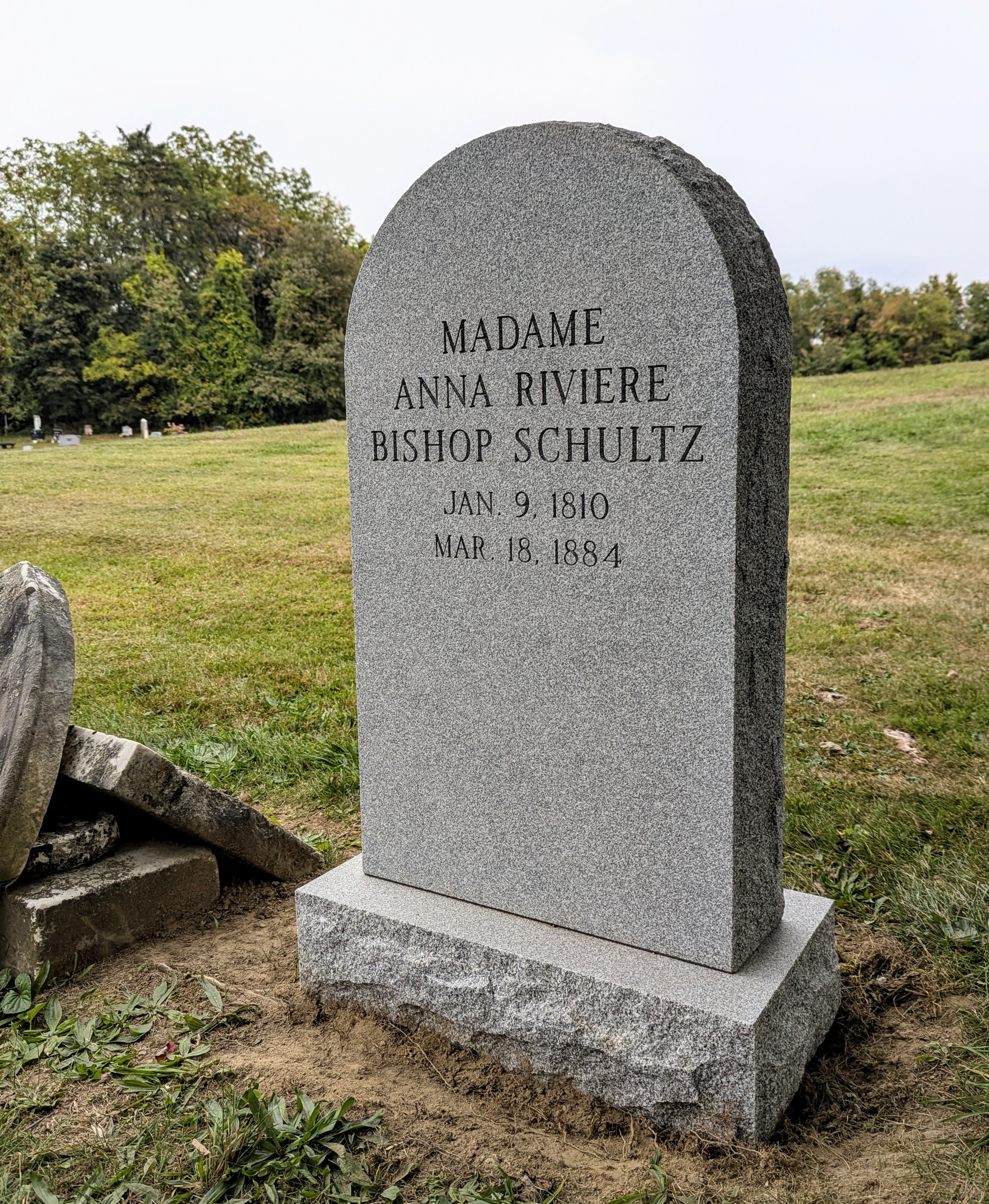
After 141 years of going unmarked, Anna Bishop's grave has a monument in St. Paul's Lutheran Cemetery in Red Hook, Dutchess County, NY

On 14 July 1873, at the personal invitation of Brigham Young, she gave the first concert at the Mormon Tabernacle in Salt Lake City. In 1875, she sang in Australia once more, then in Cape Town and other places in South Africa, on to Madeira and England, and back to New York.

By all accounts she was excellent in her prime but continued to sing well past her prime. Her final concert, at age 73, was a testimonial concert at Steinway Hall in June 1883, where she sang Home! Sweet Home!, the song that had brought fame to her first husband (whose name she still bore).

Anna Bishop Schulz died in New York in March 1884, aged 74, and was buried beside her son Augustus in St Paul's Lutheran Cemetery. The couple had spent what wealth they came into, leaving her grave unmarked for 141 years. On 22 September 2025, a gravestone was placed on her burial site by Historic Red Hook.

== Svengali and Trilby ==
It was popularly believed that George du Maurier later used the hypnotic control Nicolas-Charles Bochsa is said to have had over Bishop as the basis for the characters Svengali and Trilby in his 1894 novel Trilby.
