= Ho No Hana =

Japanese new religious movement

The Japanese sect Ho No Hana Sanpogyo (法の華三法行 Hō No Hana Sanpōgyō) was a new religious movement founded by "His Holiness" Hogen Fukunaga. The sect was found to have engaged in fortune telling fraud in Japan.

== History ==
It is often called the "foot reading cult", because its founder, Hogen Fukunaga, claimed he could make a diagnosis by examining people's feet. He founded the group in 1987 after an alleged spiritual event where he claimed to have realized he was the reincarnation of Jesus Christ and the Buddha. The group at one time claimed 30,000 members. However, Fukunaga charged $900 for the foot readings and a suspicion arose that he used the money to benefit himself. He was accused of swindling money from housewives and had to pay over a million dollars in damages.

Fukunaga started preaching in 1980, claiming to be the world's final savior following Jesus Christ and the Buddha. He was then 34 and saddled with 500 million yen of debt. Soon he became a household name through the publication of texts (nearly 70 at latest count) penned by ghostwriters. In 1987 the sect gained official recognition as a religious corporation.

In a twist on palm reading, Fukunaga and other cult leaders read the soles of people's feet. They told the victims, who visited the cult for counseling about physical or family problems, that their problems would worsen unless they attended a cult seminar, which cost 2.25 million yen, or donated up to 14.3 million yen to the cult. They used shocking words to fuel their concern, falsely claimed their diseases could be cured through training in his cult, and swindled exorbitant amounts of money from them. They were urged to purchase high-priced scrolls and other ornaments that were said to ward off evil, cure illnesses, deliver from sin, and break family curses.

The intimidation was often accompanied by a specific threat. A victim was coerced during a number of visits by cult officials to shell out another $22,000 for a five-day training seminar at the cult's sprawling headquarters below Mount Fuji. The purpose, he said, was to "purify" his mind and body.

The leader set cult members strict recruitment goals in a bid to swell the group's ranks. Separate goals were set for each of the group's branch offices. When the cult's new facility was being built, at a cost of 600 million yen, Fukunaga reportedly ordered cult members to work toward an even harder goal. Staff members eagerly studied Fukunaga's methods of threatening people to make them enroll in special training sessions, the sources said. At these meetings, Fukunaga repeatedly said that lying was acceptable to lure people to enroll in the special training. "You should use your 'wisdom' and say things, even if they may not actually be true." He explained that lies were acceptable as people would learn reason once they began the special training. The group prepared a manual to train people.

Fukunaga would wear $5,000 suits and custom-made Italian shoes. His wife, according to senior cult members, regularly spent $6,000 to $7,000 a month shopping. Fukunaga reportedly obtained 60 billion yen from more than 10,000 people over the past 13 years, while he spent enormous amounts enhancing his reputation as a religious leader by "buying" audiences with former Soviet President Mikhail Gorbachev and Pope John Paul II, President Clinton, Mother Teresa, Margaret Thatcher, Sathya Sai Baba and celebrities.

According to a report by Christian newsweekly World: "The Clinton White House fundraising scandal",

In May 1996, a fundraising dinner organized by Mr. Huang was held at the Sheraton Carlton Hotel in Washington, D.C. Yogesh Gandhi, a distant relative of Mahatma Gandhi, paid for his ticket and that of a friend, Dr. Hogen Fukunaga, with a $325,000 contribution. (At the dinner, Mr. Gandhi and Mr. Fukunaga presented Mr. Clinton the 1996 "Mahatma Gandhi World Peace Award.") Mr. Fukunaga, leader of a Japanese religious sect known as Ho no Hana Sanpogyo, is a multimillionaire, while Mr. Gandhi, a naturalized American, is a man of little means, indeed a "pauper", according to papers filed in his recent divorce case. After The Los Angeles Times reported in October the details of Mr. Gandhi's lowly economic status, the DNC concluded that the $325,000 he had donated probably never belonged to him and returned "his" money.

The founder was sentenced to 12 years in prison for bilking his flock out of 150 million yen in the name of religious training. 15 senior cult members were charged with the mass fraud. Nine of the 15 were given verdicts, with all of them convicted. Prosecutors charged them with practicing medicine without a license. Fukunaga might yet face manslaughter charges in the deaths of four recruits who died during rigorous initiation rites at Mount Fuji.

Legal experts say Japan's criminal justice system is ill-equipped to combat the cult phenomenon.
