= Footreading =

Method of divination

Footreading, also known as "solestry" (coined from sole, on the analogy of palmistry), is a method of divination by means of the foot. It involves the observation and interpretation of foot structure, skin (e.g., texture, blemishes, pigmentation) and toe nails, which are believed to reflect a person's emotions or character.

The reading of feet as a measure of character grew in popularity in the Victorian era in part due to the popularity of the novel Trilby, which featured a character notable for having beautiful feet.

== See also ==
- Reflexology
- Ho No Hana
