= Svengali (1954 film) =

1954 film

- Poster
- Directed by: Noel Langley
- Screenplay by: Noel Langley
- Based on: Trilby; 1894 novel by George du Maurier
- Produced by: George Minter
- Starring: Hildegard Knef; Donald Wolfit; Terence Morgan
- Cinematography: Wilkie Cooper
- Edited by: John Pomeroy
- Music by: William Alwyn
- Production company: Alderdale Films
- Distributed by: Renown Pictures; Metro-Goldwyn-Mayer (US)
- Release date: 1 December 1954
- Running time: 82 minutes
- Country: United Kingdom
- Language: English

Svengali is a 1954 British drama film directed and written by Noel Langley and starring Hildegard Knef, Donald Wolfit and Terence Morgan. It was based on the 1894 novel Trilby by George du Maurier. Svengali hypnotises an artist's model into becoming a great opera singer, but she struggles to escape from his powers. It was distributed in the United States by Metro-Goldwyn-Mayer.

Donald Wolfit was a last-minute replacement for actor Robert Newton, who left three weeks into filming and can still be seen in some long shots.

== Plot ==
After being fired from working as a barmaid in a Paris bar, Trilby O'Ferrall is hired by the sculptor Durian as an artist's model. She encounters three British painters living next door, including the sensitive Billy Bagot with whom she gradually falls in love. She also encounters the street musician Svengali, but does not much like him. Billy wants to marry Trilby, but his wealthy family does not approve. He is also distressed when he discovers her posing nude for a class of art students. After returning to London, he is knocked down in the street by a carriage and suffers from ill health.

In the meantime, after he is able to cure her of a headache, Svengali takes control of Trilby's life. Despite her previously only being able to badly sing the parlour song "Alice, Where Art Thou?", which she learnt from her Irish father, he now coaches her and transforms her into a magnificent opera singer through his mesmerising technique. She becomes an international success, performing in capitals across Europe; led by the domineering Svengali, she forgets Billy completely. However, when he attends a performance of hers in London, the spell is shattered and instead of performing classical opera to the expectant crowd she sings "Alice, Where Are Thou?" in her old voice.

== Cast ==
- Hildegard Knef as Trilby O'Ferrall (credited as 'Hildegarde Neff')
- Donald Wolfit as Svengali
- Terence Morgan as Billy Bagot
- Derek Bond as The Laird
- Paul Rogers as Taffy
- David Kossoff as Gecko
- Hubert Gregg as Durian
- Noel Purcell as Patrick O'Ferrall
- Alfie Bass as Carrell
- Harry Secombe as Barizel
- Peter Illing as police inspector
- Joan Haythorne as Mrs. Bagot
- Hugh Cross as Dubose
- David Oxley as Dodor
- Richard Pearson as Lambert
- Michael Craig as Zouzou
- Arnold Bell as Tout
- Martin Boddey as doctor
- Neville Phillips as Contran
- Rica Fox as dresser
- Toots Pounds as Mama Martin
- Joan Heal as barmaid
- Cyril Smith as 1st stage manager
- Marne Maitland as 2nd stage manager
- Jeremy Brett as Pierre
- Michael Hordern as Billy's uncle
- Aileen Lewis as Covent Garden patron
- Elisabeth Schwarzkopf as Trilby O'Ferrall (singing voice)

== Production ==
The film was made at Walton Studios near London with sets designed by art director Frederick Pusey and costumes by Beatrice Dawson. It was shot in Eastmancolor.

== Critical reception ==
The Monthly Film Bulletin wrote: "Svengali is a fairly faithful screen adaptation of du Maurier's Trilby, and is very handsomely dressed, mainly following the author's original illustrations ... Hildegarde Neff's Trilby is handsome but spiritless, and her Irish accent is doubtful, while Terence Morgan makes a colourless hero. Donald Wolfit, however, is most successfully cast as Svengali. To match the splendidly macabre appearance intended by du Maurier, he gives a performance of uninhibited bravura, with moments even of grandeur. To have managed, in addition, touches of pathos is a praiseworthy achievement. Unfortunately, however, the script and direction do not match up to this one performance; and, fairly or not, du Maurier's story re-appears in this version as a badly dated, over-coloured and somewhat tedious melodrama."

Under the heading, "Sixth Filming of Novel Fails to Hypnotize", The New York Times critic described the film as "a stylized curio that seems out of place in the atomic age [...] as old-fashioned as side whiskers and bustles".

Variety called the film "a heavy, sombre and dated melodrama."

Kine Weekly wrote: Hildegarde Neff, skilfully dubbed by Madame Elisabeth Schwarzkopf, [...] has beauty and intelligence as Trilby, and Terence Morgan is a handsome, perfectly-mannered, though somewhat ingenuous, Billy. The rest, too, are first rate. There is no conscious striving for effect, but even so the story steadily builds up to a spellbinding climax in which music plays an important part. Moreover, its lavish décor cleverly captures the spirit and the mood of its gaslight period.”

Leslie Halliwell said: "Flatulent remake which does have the virtue of following the original book illustrations but is otherwise unpersuasive."

In British Sound Films: The Studio Years 1928–1959 David Quinlan rated the film as “average” and wrote: “Wolfit’s chew-the-scenery style suited to this role, but otherwise unsuccessful.''

DVD Talk, comparing it to the 1931 John Barrymore version posited that "the 1954 British film fleshes out the characters of Trilby and Billy considerably and adds a lot of color and subtlety, but the results suggest that a more flamboyant approach might have worked better than the lush but tame version that resulted. The Eastmancolor production aims for an evocative atmosphere akin to John Huston's gorgeous Moulin Rouge (1952), photographed in Technicolor by Oswald Morris. Svengali was made on a fraction of that film's budget, though does look handsome for what it is."
