= Libelle (barque) =

Iron-hulled ship built in Bremen in 1864

History

Bremen
- Name: Libelle
- Launched: October 24, 1864
- Fate: Wrecked on the reef at Wake Island March 4, 1866

General characteristics
- Class & type: Barque
- Tonnage: 650 (net)

Libelle was a 650-ton iron-hulled barque, built in the Free City of Bremen in 1864. The ship was transporting quicksilver and passengers when she wrecked on the eastern reef of Wake Island in 1866. After three weeks they set out in a longboat and Gig they sailed to Guam, with only 22 in the longboat making it. In the years that followed many made expeditions to search cargo of the Libelle, to make dives to recover the quicksilver flasks. The anchor remains on Peale island, and was rediscovered in the 1930s when Wake became a seaplane port with a hotel.

== History ==
Libelle was launched on September 24, 1864, and on October 8, the ship set sail for Honolulu. From Hawaii, Libelle sailed to the Chinese ports of Hong Kong and Niuzhuang.

== Shipwreck ==
On the night of March 4, 1866, Libelle struck the eastern reef of Wake Island during a gale. Commanded by Captain Anton Tobias, the ship was en route from San Francisco to Hong Kong. Among its passengers were the 50-year-old English-born opera singer Madame Anna Bishop (on the first leg of a Far East tour), her second husband and New York diamond merchant Martin Schultz, pianist and vocalist Charles Lascelles, Eugene Van Reed who was the first Consul General of the then independent Kingdom of Hawaii to the Court of the Emperor of Japan, and Imperial Japanese military officer Yabe Kisaboro. After a night on board the vessel now stuck on the reef, the passengers and crew reached the shore with very limited supplies such as some bedding, a barrel of beef, several bags of flour and some kegs of wine. After three days of searching and digging on the island for water the crew was able to recover a 200-gallon water tank from the wrecked ship. Valuable cargo was also recovered and buried on the island including some of the 1,000 flasks of mercury (quicksilver), as well as coins and precious stones valued at $93,943.08. After three weeks with a dwindling water supply and no sign of rescue, the passengers and crew decided to leave Wake and attempt to sail to Guam (the center of the then Spanish colony of the Mariana Islands) on the two remaining boats from Libelle. The 22 passengers and some of the crew sailed in the 22 foot longboat under the command of the first mate Rudolf Kausch and the remainder of the crew sailed with Captain Tobias in the 20 foot gig. On April 8, 1866, after thirteen days of frequent squalls, short rations, and tropical sun, the longboat reached Guam. The gig, commanded by the captain, was lost at sea.

== Treasure and cargo salvage ==
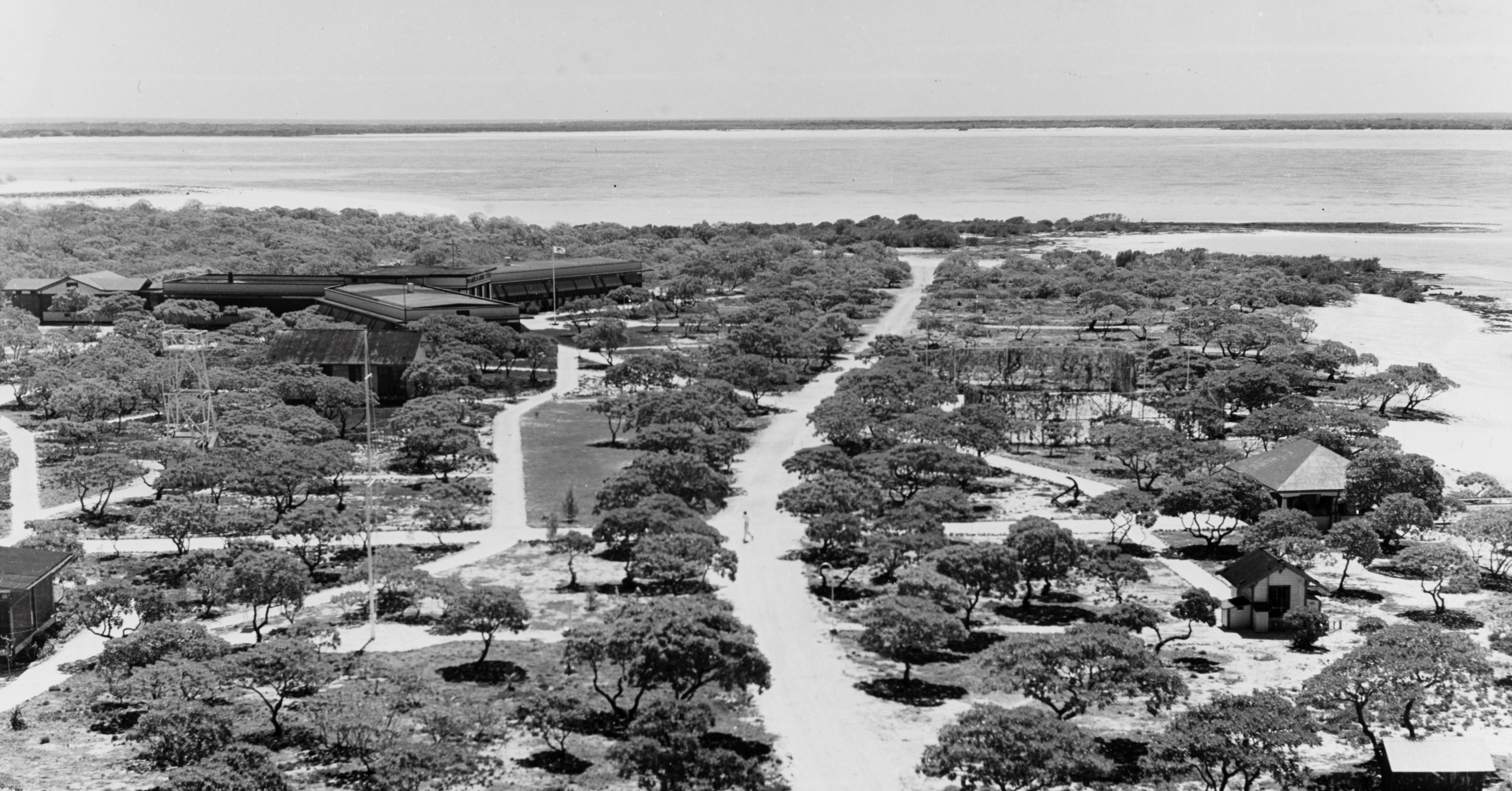
The salvaged anchor of the Libelle can be seen on the right as part of the Pan American facilities

The Spanish Governor of the Mariana Islands, Francisco Moscoso y Lara, welcomed and provided aid to Libelle shipwreck survivors on Guam. He also ordered the schooner Ana, owned and commanded by his son-in-law George H. Johnston, to be dispatched with the first mate Kausch to search for the missing gig and then sail on to Wake Island to confirm the shipwreck story and recover the buried treasure. Ana departed Guam on April 10 and, after two days at Wake Island, found and salvaged the buried coins and precious stones as well as a small quantity of the quicksilver. Over the next two years other ships sailed to the shipwreck site to conduct salvage operations. In January 1867, the American schooner, Caroline Mills brought a diving suit, then commonly known as "submarine armour", to Libelle wreck site. Only a few flasks of quicksilver were recovered using the diving suit so Captain Nickols decided to abandon the effort. On May 9, 1867, the sloop Hokulele from Honolulu, with a party headed by Thomas R. Foster, arrived at Wake and was joined by a brig from China. The Chinese captain did not reveal his ship's name. Together the two ships recovered 495 flasks of the quicksilver with 247 flasks going to Hokulele. In October 1867, the Honolulu schooner Moi Wahine arrived at Wake and Captain English, Thomas R. Foster (who also sailed with Hokulele) and nine Hawaiian divers were landed on the island with part of their supplies. Captain Zenas Bent, first mate Mr. White and seven Hawaiian seamen remained on board the ship. In the evening on the second day, when the winds picked up and shifted, the crew of the schooner pulled anchor and put out to sea to avoid striking the reef. The next day Moi Wahine did not return having perished in a gale, stranding the salvage party on Wake. Fortunately for the party, one piece of equipment that was unloaded from the ship was an apparatus for distilling water. With plenty of potable water, fish, birds and eggs, the men were able to survive and live without serious inconvenience. After five months, the British brig Cleo arrived at Wake, rescued the castaways and recovered 240 flasks of quicksilver, some copper, anchor and chain.

The anchor was salvaged when Pan American Hotel was built on Peale island of Wake.

Debris from the wreck would wash up on Wake as late as 1940.

== Anchor ==
The anchor of the Libelle was incorporated into a hydroponic garden of the Pan American hotel in the 1930s, which was part of the seaplane airport for Transpacific flights. When hotel was being constructed the anchor from the ship was salvaged and used as attraction for guests.
