= Svengali (1983 film) =

- Genre: Drama; Romance
- Based on: Trilby by George du Maurier
- Written by: Frank Cucci; Charles Dennis; George du Maurier
- Directed by: Anthony Harvey
- Starring: Peter O'Toole; Jodie Foster
- Music by: John Barry
- Country of origin: United States
- Original language: English

Production
- Executive producer: Robert A. Halmi
- Producer: Robert Halmi Sr.
- Production location: New York City
- Cinematography: Larry Pizer
- Editor: Norman Gay
- Running time: 100 minutes
- Production company: Robert Halmi
- Budget: $2 million

Original release
- Network: CBS
- Release: March 9, 1983

Svengali is a 1983 American television film based on the 1894 novel Trilby by George du Maurier.

== Cast ==
- Peter O'Toole as Anton Bosnyak
- Jodie Foster as Zoe Alexander
- Elizabeth Ashley as Eve Swiss
- Larry Joshua as Johnny Rainbow
- Pamela Blair as Trish
- Barbara Bryne as Mrs. Burns-Rizzo
- Ron Weyand as Hypnotist
- Robin Thomas as Mendy Weindenbaum
- Brian Carney as Abbot Renfrew
- Madeleine Potter as Antonia
- Holly Hunter as Leslie
- Vera Mayer as Gizella
- Stuart Charno as Boomer

== Production ==
Mitchell Galin helped develop the film. He was working for the producer, read the script, felt it was promising but that it needed a rewrite. He received $10,000 for a new writer and hired Frank Cucci. Galin told Cucci to write the role for Peter O'Toole and that is who wound up being cast.

Filming took place over 20 days. Shortly after filming, director Anthony Harvey had a near-fatal car crash. "I hadn't been in hospital but a week," he says, "when CBS started cutting the movie, seriously harming it. All the more fragile moments are gone and so are the exterior scenes that opened up the story."
