= Svengali =

Fictional character from the 1894 novel Trilby by George du Maurier

Svengali as a spider in his web. Illustration by George du Maurier (1895).

Svengali (/svɛŋˈɡɑːli/) is a character in the novel Trilby, which was first published in 1894 by George du Maurier. Svengali is a Jewish man who seduces, dominates and exploits Trilby, a young orphan girl working in Paris, and makes her into a famous singer.

== Definition ==
Since the book's publication in 1894, the word "svengali" has come to refer to a person who, with evil intent, dominates, manipulates and controls another.

In court, the "Svengali defence" is a legal tactic that portrays the defendant as a pawn in the scheme of a greater, and more influential, criminal mastermind.

== Novel ==
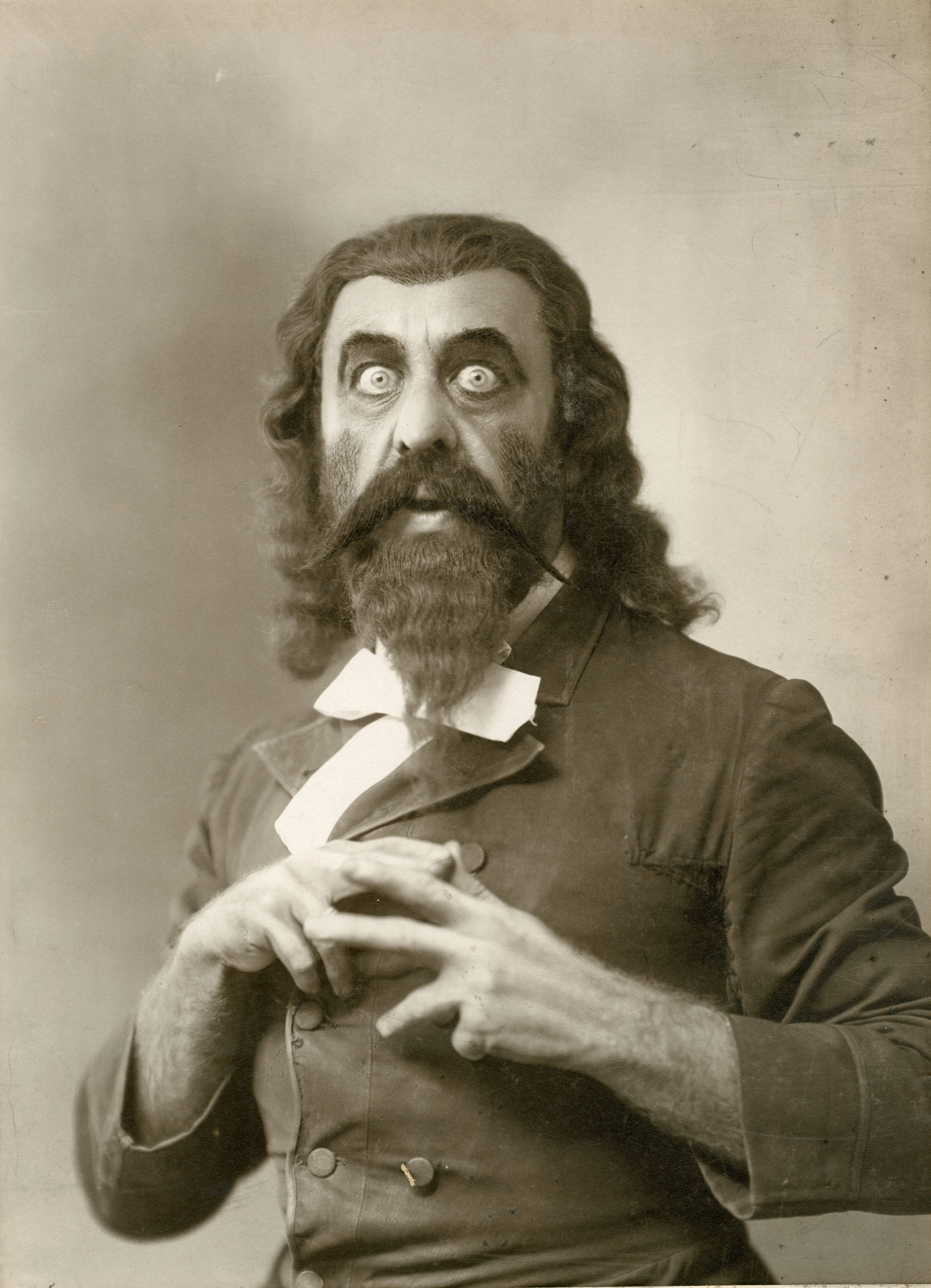
Wilton Lackaye as Svengali (1905)

Svengali is a stereotypical antisemitic portrayal of an Ashkenazic (Eastern European) Jew, complete with "bold, black, beady Jew's eyes" and a "hoarse, rasping, nasal, throaty rook's caw, his big yellow teeth baring themselves in a mongrel canine snarl". He is continually filthy yet still "clean enough to suit (his own) kind". George Orwell wrote that Svengali, who—while cleverer than the Englishmen—is evil, effeminate, and physically repugnant, was "a sinister caricature of the traditional type" and an example of "the prevailing form of antisemitism."

(Svengali) would either fawn or bully, and could be grossly impertinent. He had one kind of cynical humour, which was more offensive than amusing, and always laughed at the wrong thing, at the wrong time, in the wrong place, and his laughter was always derisive, and full of malice.

In the novel, Svengali transforms Trilby into a great singer by using hypnosis. Unable to perform without Svengali's help, Trilby becomes entranced.

== Portrayals ==
Svengali was almost immediately stripped of his Jewishness in portrayals. Svengali was first portrayed by the English actor Herbert Beerbohm Tree in London and by the actor Wilton Lackaye in the United States in the stage play of 1895, Trilby. The story has also been used in several movies.

The character was portrayed in the following films which were all titled Svengali: first by Ferdinand Bonn in the silent film of 1914, then by Paul Wegener in the silent film of 1927, by John Barrymore in 1931, by Donald Wolfit in 1954 (in Technicolor), and by Peter O'Toole in the film of 1983, which was a modernised version made for television and co-starred Jodie Foster. In the 1983 movie, however, the names of the characters were changed.

== See also ==
- Svengali deck
