= Evetts =

Evetts is a surname. Notable people with the surname include:

- Deborah Evetts, English-born American fine bookbinder, and book conservator
- Dee Evetts, English haiku poet and writer
- Hayley Evetts (born 1976), English singer, television presenter and stage actor
- John Fullerton Evetts (1891–1988), British Army officer
- Julian Evetts (1911–1996), English cricketer
- Steve Evetts, American record producer
- Ted Evetts (born 1997), English darts player
- William Evetts (1847–1936), English cricketer
