= Henry Brodribb Irving =

Henry Brodribb Irving may refer to:

- Henry Irving, actor, 1838 - 1905
- Harry Brodribb Irving, actor, his son, 1870 - 1919
