= Irving family =

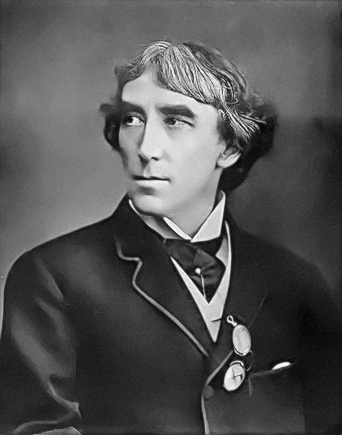
Sir Henry Irving

The Irving family are the descendants of Samuel Brodribb, (born c. 1800 at Clutton – died in Bristol 20 June 1876), a salesman who collected orders for the tailoring department of a local store, and his wife Mary, née Behenna, (christened 31 January 1808 at Lelant, Cornwall – died 1869), the daughter of a Cornish farming family.

Their son was:

Sir Henry Irving (1838–1905), born John Brodribb, a notable English stage actor in the Victorian era. He married Florence O'Callaghan on 15 July 1869 at St. Marylebone, London.

Henry Irving was the father of:

- Laurence Sydney Brodribb Irving (1871–1914), an English actor, dramatist and novelist, who married the actress Mabel Hackney. Their children were:

- Laurence Irving Brodribb (1903–1988)
- Dorothy Elizabeth Irving Brodribb (1906–2003).

- Harry Brodribb Irving (1870–1919), an actor, who married the actress Dorothea Baird. Their children were:

- Laurence Irving OBE (1897–1988), a Hollywood set designer and art director. He married Rosalind Woolner, the grand-daughter of the Pre-Raphaelite sculptor, Thomas Woolner. Their children are:

- Pamela Mary Irving (born 22 March 1921).
- John H. B. Irving (born 1924)

- John H. B. Irving's grand-daughter Imogen Irving (b. 15 January 1994) Actor, currently in training.

- Elizabeth Irving OBE (1904–2003), an actress, the Chairman of the National Federation of Women's Institutes (W.I.) and the founder in 1955 of the Keep Britain Tidy Group. She married Sir Felix John Morgan Brunner, 3rd Bt. Their sons are:

- Sir John Henry Kilian Brunner, 4th Bt. (b. 1 June 1927)
- Nicholas Laurence Brodribb Brunner (1 January 1929 – 3 March 1931)
- Timothy Barnabas Hans Brunner (b. 28 February 1932)
- Daniel Felix Brodribb Brunner (30 July 1933 – 28 November 1976)
- Sir Hugo Lawrence Joseph Brunner KCVO (b. 17 August 1935)

== See also ==
- List of show business families
