= Laurence Irving (dramatist) =

English dramatist and actor

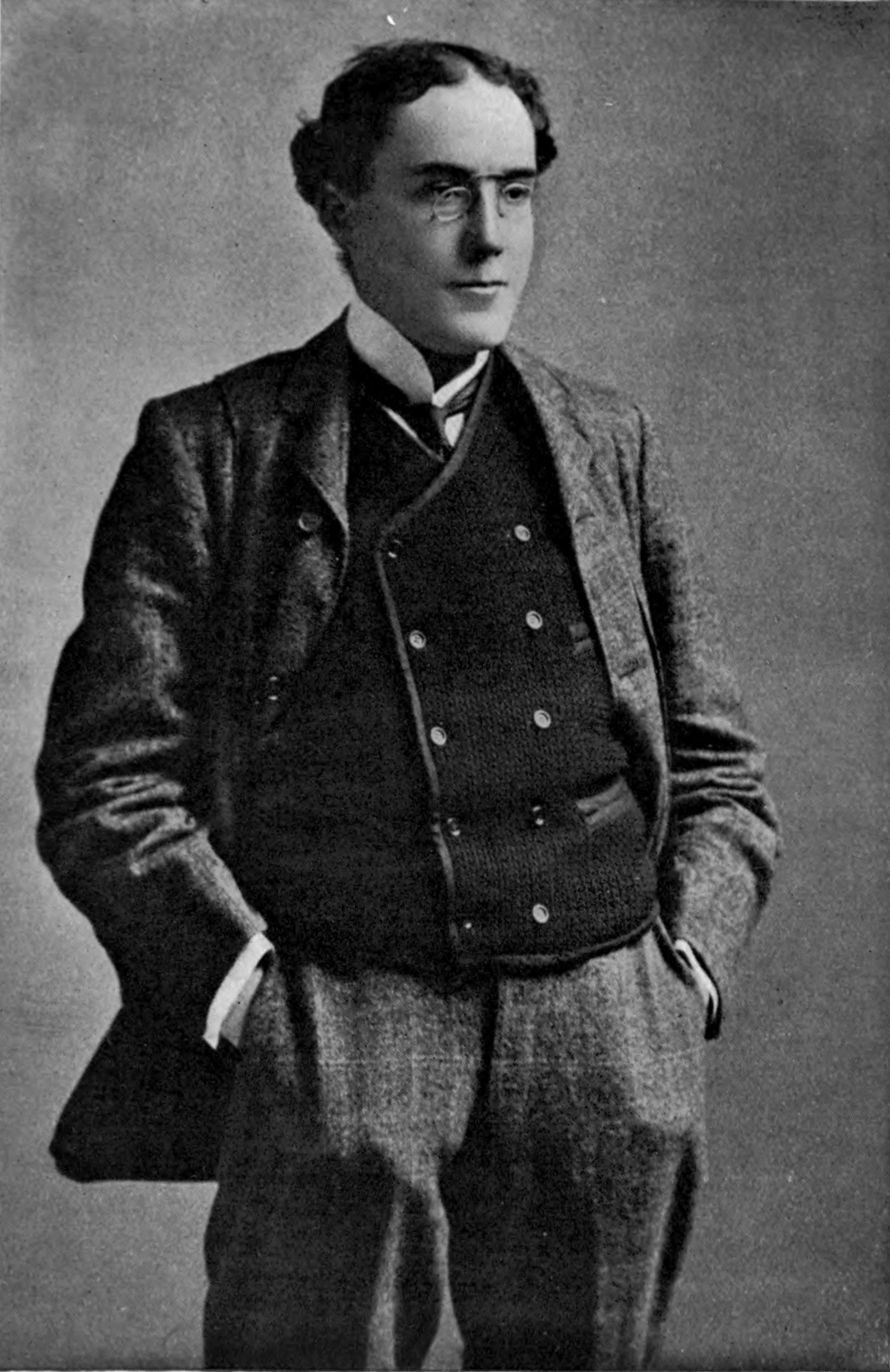
- Laurence Irving (1871–1914)
- Born: 21 December 1871; London, England
- Died: 29 May 1914 (aged 42); Saint Lawrence River, Canada
- Occupations: Actor, dramatist
- Spouse: Mabel Hackney (m. 1903)
- Children: 3
- Parents: Henry Irving (father); Florence O'Callaghan (mother)
- Relatives: H. B. Irving (brother); Laurence Irving (nephew); Elizabeth Irving (niece)

Laurence Sydney Brodribb Irving (21 December 1871 – 29 May 1914) was an English dramatist and actor, and the son of actor Henry Irving. He died along with his wife, Mabel Hackney, in the Empress of Ireland disaster in 1914.

== Life and career ==
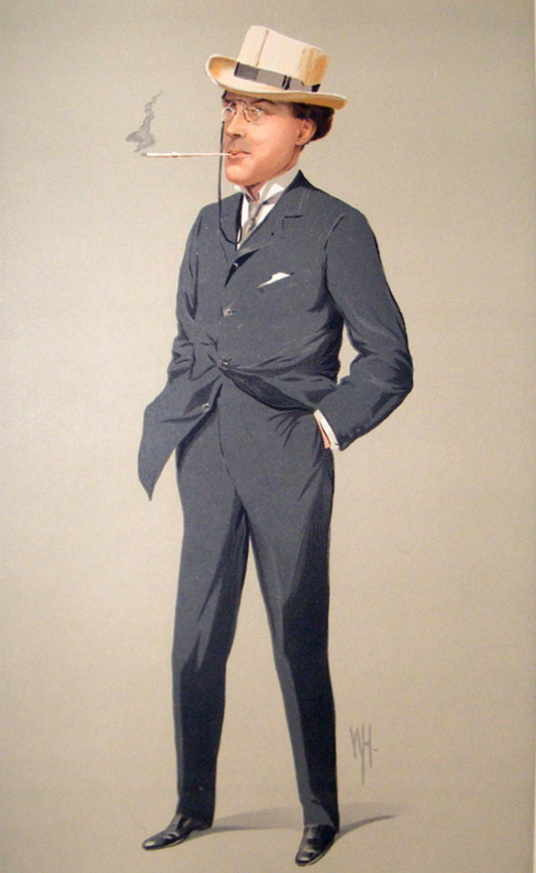
Irving as depicted in Vanity Fair in 1912

Born in London, Laurence Irving was a son of the great Victorian actor-manager, Sir Henry Irving and his wife Florence (née O'Callaghan), and brother to actor manager Harry Brodribb Irving. He was educated at Marlborough College and the College Rollin in Paris, following which he was in Russia for three years studying for the Foreign Office. However, instead he took up acting, making his first appearance in 1891 as Snug in The Dream in F. R. Benson's theatrical company – not counting childhood performances. In 1892 he appeared at Toole's Theatre in Daisy's Escape, and after a time toured as Svengali in Trilby. In 1898 he joined his father's Company at the Lyceum Theatre, taking minor roles or juvenile leads as in Peter the Great (1898), Robespierre (1899), as Courriol in The Lyons Mail (1900), Coriolanus (1900–01), Dante (1902–03), Much Ado About Nothing (1904–05), and as Nemours in Louis Xl. Robespierre was his own translation from the French play of Victorien Sardou, as was Dante, in which his father acted.

Soon after he became an actor-manager starring with his own Company, playing the title role in Hamlet. He adapted Dostoevsky's Crime and Punishment into The Unwritten Law and just before sailing for the United States and Canada in 1912 he made a success in London with his own adaptation from the Hungarian of a Japanese subject entitled The Typhoon. A topical play set in the time of the Russo-Japanese War, with Irving playing a Japanese officer, it was first produced by him at the Haymarket Theatre in April 1912 before taking it on a tour of the provinces. His talents as an actor were recognised in his portrayal of the crafty old Nikolas Arnesson, Bishop of Oslo in Ibsen's tragedy The Pretenders at the Haymarket. He was Iago in a production of Othello at His Majesty's Theatre.

Irving was also a dramatist, his stage plays including Robespierre (1899), Richard Lovelace (1901), Dante (1903), The Fool Hath Said: There Is No God (1908), The Incubus (1909), The Affinity (1910), and The Three Daughters of Monsieur Dupont (1910). Due to the financial failure of his play Dante his father was forced to sell the Lyceum Theatre, London. Irving was married to a fellow performer, actress Mabel Lucy Hackney (1872–1914).

Laurence and Mabel were on a tour of first Australia and then North America from 1912 to 1914. Their biggest success on the tour was Laurence's own play The Typhoon.

== Death ==
At the end of the tour they were returning home when Laurence and Mabel Irving drowned in the RMS Empress of Ireland disaster on May 29, 1914, when in the early hours of the morning, The Empress of Ireland was rammed by the Storstad, a Norwegian collier, in her starboard midsection. Storstad remained afloat, however Empress of Ireland was severely damaged. A gaping hole in her side caused the lower decks to flood faster than the crew could handle, made worse by the Empress' ever increasing starboard list. Most of the passengers and crew located in the lower decks drowned quickly and water entered through open portholes, some only a few feet above the water line, and inundated passageways and cabins. Those berthed in the upper decks were awakened by the collision, and immediately boarded lifeboats on the boat deck. Within a few minutes of the collision, the list was so severe that the port lifeboats could not be launched. At least one boat was lowered on the port side, which boat is not clear, however what is known is that said boat flipped during lowering spilling its occupants into the frigid water. Five starboard lifeboats were launched successfully, while a sixth capsized during lowering on the starboard side.

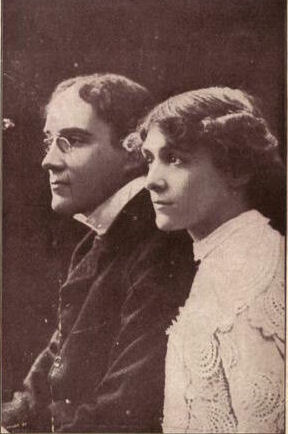
Irving and Mabel Hackney in The Incubus c1910

Ten or eleven minutes after the collision, Empress of Ireland lurched violently onto her starboard side, allowing as many as 700 passengers and crew to crawl out of the portholes and decks onto her port side. The ship lay on her side for a minute or two, having seemingly run aground. A few minutes later at 02:10, about 14 minutes after the collision, the bow rose briefly out of the water and the ship finally sank. Hundreds of people were thrown into the near-freezing water. The disaster resulted in the deaths of 1,012 people.

Accounts of the tragedy say that Laurence and Mabel Irving were separated and whilst Laurence may have been in a position of temporary safety, he knew Mabel could not swim and so jumped back into the St. Lawrence River to rescue her. Their bodies were never recovered.

== See also ==
- Irving Family

== Bibliography ==
- Godefroi and Yolande: A medieval play in one act (1894)
- "Much Ado About Nothing" (1905)
- Typhoon (1913)
