= Princess Clementina =

- Directed by: William G.B. Barker
- Written by: A.E.W. Mason (Novel); George P. Bancroft (Play)
- Produced by: William G.B. Barker
- Starring: H.B. Irving; Alice Young; Dorothea Baird
- Release date: 1911
- Country: United Kingdom
- Languages: Silent film English intertitles

Princess Clementina is a 1911 British silent historical adventure film, directed and produced by William G.B. Barker. This film was based on a stage adaptation of the book Clementina by A.E.W. Mason.

== Cast ==
- H.B. Irving as Charles Wogan
- Alice Young as Princess Clementina
- Dorothea Baird as Jenny
- Eille Norwood as James Stuart
- Nigel Playfair as Prince of Baden
- Arthur Whitby as Harry Whittington
- Charles Allan as Cardinal Origo
- Henry Vibart as Major Richard Gaydon
- Frederick Lloyd as Captain John Missen
