= Mabel Hackney =

British actress

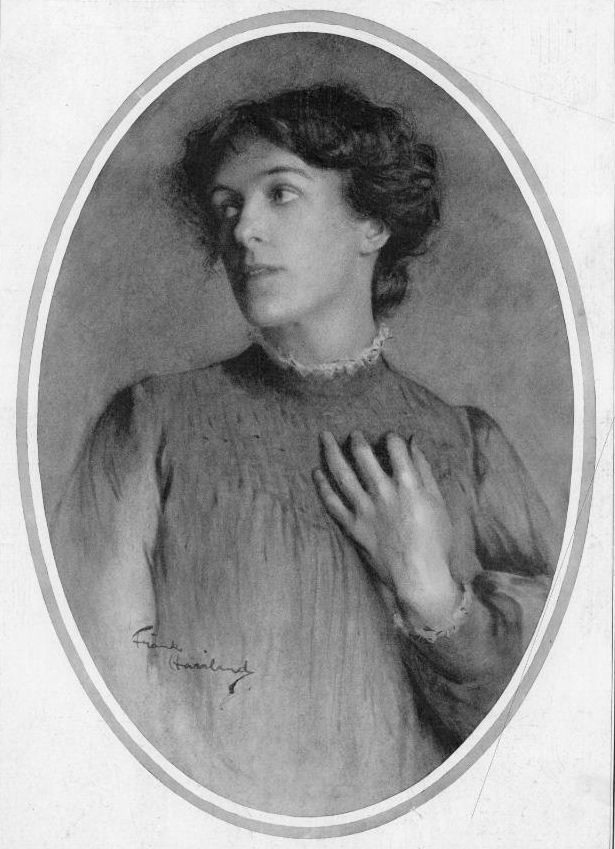
- Mabel Lucy Hackney as Phyllis in The Thunderbolt (1908)
- Born: 17 January 1872; Swansea, Wales
- Died: 29 May 1914 (aged 42) near the mouth of the St. Lawrence River
- Cause of death: drowning, Empress of Ireland disaster
- Occupation: actress
- Spouse: Laurence Irving (m. 1903)
- Children: 3

Mabel Lucy Hackney (17 January 1872 – 29 May 1914) was a British actress and the wife of the dramatist and actor Laurence Irving and daughter-in-law of the actor Henry Irving in whose company she acted before she joined that of her husband. She died along with her husband in the Empress of Ireland disaster in 1914.

== Early career ==
She was born in Swansea in Wales in 1872, the daughter of William Hackney (1842–1891) and Susan Lucy (née Penrose; 1848–after 1914).

Hackney began her acting career as the understudy to Evelyn Millard at the St James's Theatre. Here she played Lady Clarice Raindean in The Masqueraders opposite George Alexander (1894); Amelia, Countess of Rassendyll in The Prisoner of Zenda (1896); and Blanche Oriel in Pinero's The Princess and the Butterfly (1897). She was Ottoline Mallinson in Lord and Lady Algy (1898) and Nelly Mostyn in Constancy at the Comedy Theatre (1898).

== The Lyceum and marriage ==
Joining the Company of Henry Irving at the Lyceum Theatre in London she appeared in The Lyons Mail; was Virgilia in Coriolanus (1901); Nora Brewster in Arthur Conan Doyle's A Story of Waterloo (1901); Annette in The Bells (1901); and Nerissa in The Merchant of Venice (1901). In the company, she met her future husband, Laurence Irving. She was in Irving's The London Lyceum Company during its 1901–02 tour of North America, among other roles playing Sarah Oldfield in the curtain-raiser Nance Oldfield opposite Ellen Terry on a bill which featured Irving as Mathias in The Bells. The company also performed The Merchant of Venice during the tour. She played Pia dei Tolomei opposite Henry Irving in the title role in Dante at the Theatre Royal, Drury Lane (1903).

Hackney married Laurence Irving in 1903. Their children were Laurence Irving Brodribb (1903–1988) and Dorothy Elizabeth Irving Brodribb (1906–2003).

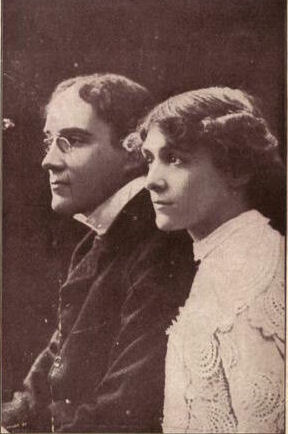
Laurence Irving and Hackney in The Incubus c. 1910

She was Lucy Sacheverell in a tour of her husband's play Richard Lovelace (1903) in a cast that included Irving and Gerald Lawrence. She was Alice Maitland opposite Harley Granville Barker in The Voysey Inheritance (1905) and in Pan and the Young Shepherd (1906), both at the Royal Court Theatre.

She created the role of Phyllis in Pinero's The Thunderbolt at the St James's Theatre (1908) and in the same year toured with her husband in Peg Woffington. During 1909–10, the couple were in New York appearing in The Incubus and The Three Daughters of M. Dupont.

== Stage career ==
In 1910 she appeared as Young Lady opposite her husband in his play The Dog Between at His Majesty's Theatre and as Sonia Martinova opposite him in his play The Unwritten Law which originally played at the Garrick Theatre before transferring to the Kingsway Theatre in 1911. She appeared as one of the Twelve Hours in a star-studded and all-female production of Ben Jonson's The Vision of Delight at His Majesty's Theatre (1911) that included Mrs. Patrick Campbell, Lily Brayton, Evelyn Millard, Lillie Langtry, Clara Butt, Lena Ashwell and Lilian Braithwaite. In the same year, she played the title role opposite her husband in Margaret Catchpole at the Duke of York's Theatre while later in 1911 the Irvings took The Unwritten Law on tour together with The Lily in which Hackney was Christiane. In 1912, she played Gringoire in her husband's adaptation The King and the Vagabond at the Kingsway Theatre. The couple were on a tour of first Australia and then North America from 1912 to 1914. Their biggest success on the tour was Laurence Irving's own play The Typhoon which was a topical play set in the time of the Russo-Japanese War, in which he played a Japanese officer.

== Death ==
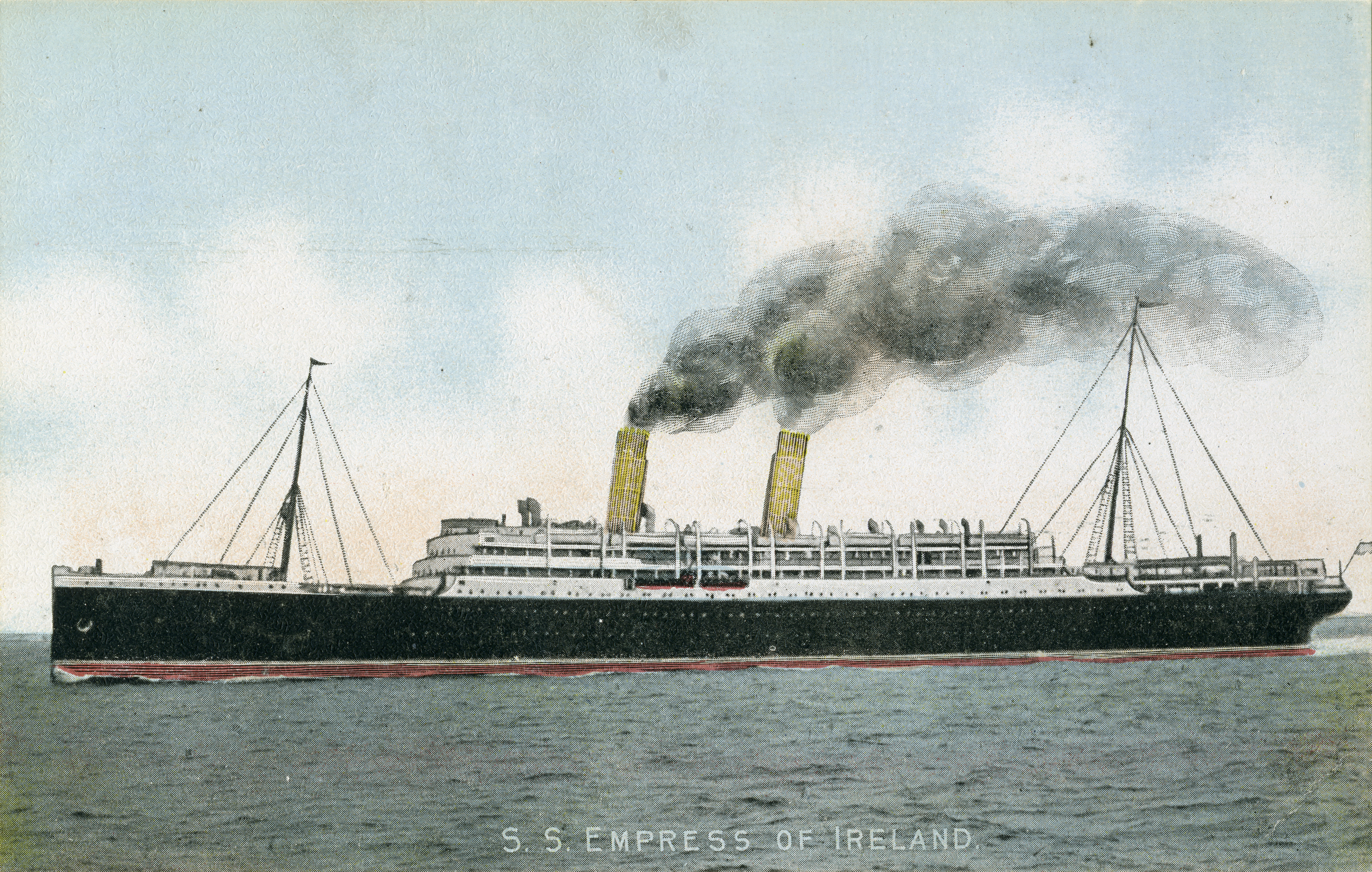
Colourized photo of Empress of Ireland

At the end of the tour they were returning home when Laurence and Mabel Irving drowned in the RMS Empress of Ireland disaster. In the early hours of the morning on 29 May 1914, near the mouth of the St. Lawrence River, the Empress of Ireland was rammed by the Storstad, a Norwegian collier, on her starboard bow. Storstad remained afloat, but Empress of Ireland was severely damaged. A gaping hole in her side caused the lower decks to flood at a rate alarming to the crew. Empress of Ireland lurched heavily to starboard. Most of the passengers and crew located in the lower decks drowned quickly and water entered through open portholes, some only a few feet above the water line, and inundated passageways and cabins. Those berthed in the upper decks were awakened by the collision, and immediately boarded lifeboats on the boat deck. Within a few minutes of the collision, the list was so severe that the port lifeboats could not be launched. Some passengers attempted to do so but the lifeboats just crashed into the side of the ship, spilling their occupants into the frigid water. Five starboard lifeboats were launched successfully, while a sixth capsized during lowering.

Ten or eleven minutes after the collision, Empress of Ireland lurched violently onto her starboard side, allowing as many as 700 passengers and crew to crawl out of the portholes and decks onto her port side. The ship lay on her side for a minute or two, having seemingly run aground. A few minutes later at 02:10, about 14 minutes after the collision, the bow rose briefly out of the water and the ship finally sank. Hundreds of people were thrown into the near-freezing water. The disaster resulted in the deaths of 1,012 people. News accounts of the tragedy say that Laurence Irving and Mabel Hackney got separated and Irving was in a position of temporary safety, but aware that Mabel could not swim, he jumped back into the water to rescue her. Their bodies were never found.

In her will, Mabel Irving left £5,761 3s 11d to her widowed mother, Susan, who presumably was raising her orphaned children.

An eyewitness named Burt reported that Irving had obtained two lifebelts, one of which he put on his wife. However, she "cried bitterly, and fainted in her husband's arms" despite him imploring her to "keep cool". Then, Burt reported, "they climbed up the sloping deck to the water’s edge. I saw them clasped in one another’s arms. They would not jump, but stood in a fervent embrace. They showered kisses on each other, and they must have died in each other’s arms."

== See also ==
- Irving family
