= Tackley =

Village in Oxfordshire, England

Coordinates: 51.880°N 1.308°W

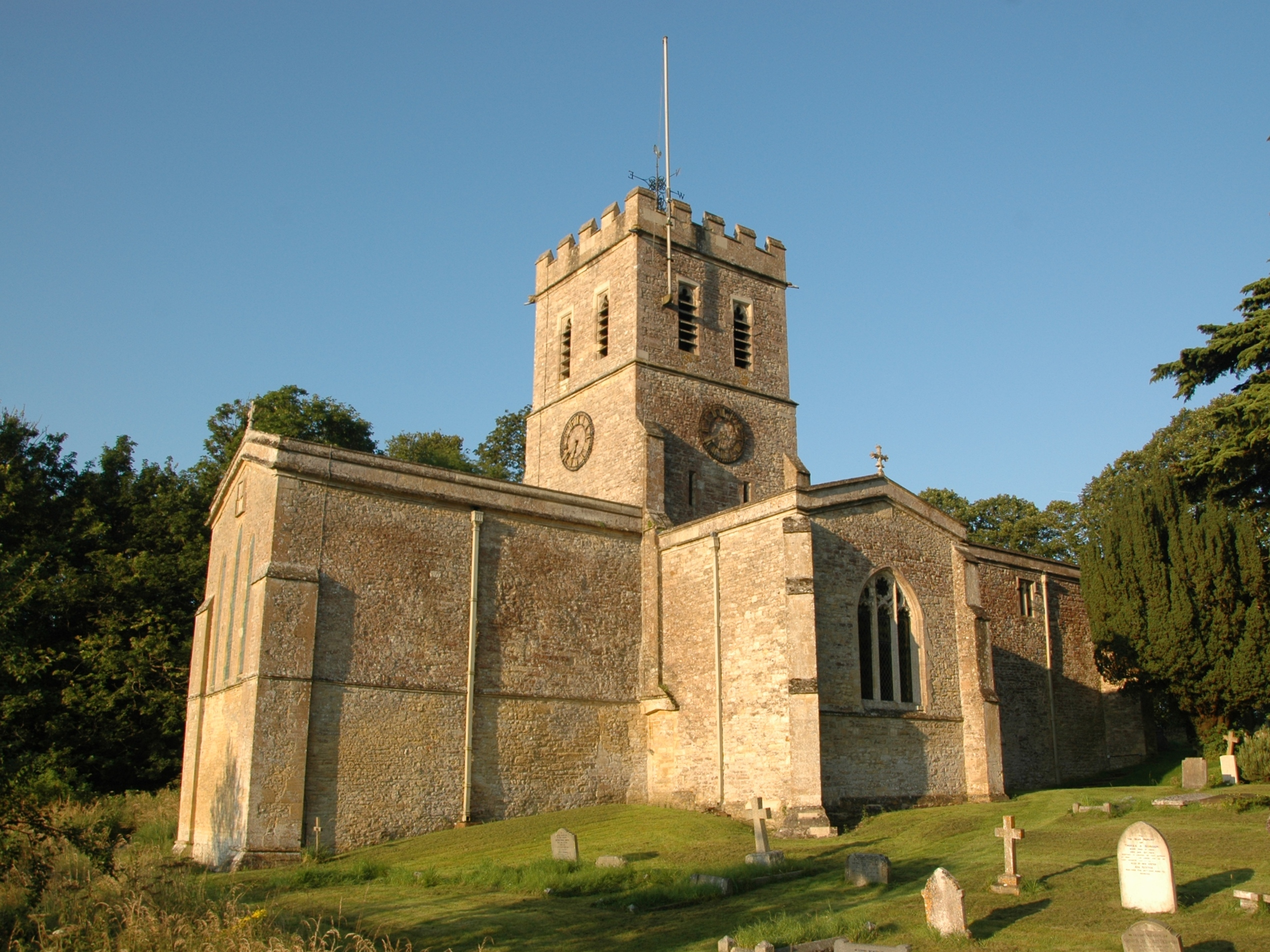
- St. Nicholas' parish church from the north-east

- Location within Oxfordshire
- Population: 998 (2011 census)
- OS grid reference: SP4820
- District: West Oxfordshire
- Shire county: Oxfordshire
- Region: South East
- Country: England
- Sovereign state: United Kingdom
- Post town: Kidlington
- Postcode district: OX5
- Dialling code: 01869
- Police: Thames Valley
- Fire: Oxfordshire
- Ambulance: South Central
- UK Parliament: Bicester and Woodstock
- Website: Tackley – Oxfordshire

Tackley is a village and civil parish beside the River Cherwell in Oxfordshire, England. It is about 6 miles (10 km) west of Bicester and 4 1/2 miles (7 km) north of Kidlington. The village consists of two neighbourhoods: Tackley itself, and Nethercott. The 2011 census recorded the parish's population as 998.

== Archaeology ==
The course of Akeman Street Roman road passes through the parish just south of the village.

== Manor ==
Tackley has existed since Saxon times. After the Norman Conquest of England William the Conqueror granted the manor of Tackley to Hugh d'Avranches, 1st Earl of Chester. The Manor House was built in 1657 and Tackley Park, also known as Hill Court, was built late in the 17th century. Both houses have been demolished but their outbuildings, including a thatched barn and two dovecotes, remain. Another 17th-century house, Court Farm (or Base Court), still survives but its interior was completely remodelled in the 1950s. Court Farm is near the site of a 12th-century moated house, and has a set of 17th century fish ponds, constructed by John Harborne (1582–1651), a wealthy merchant from the Middle Temple who purchased the manor of Tackley in 1612, and had embarked on creating there a new mansion with an elaborate water garden. The remains of one square and two triangular ponds, no doubt originally containing fish, are visible today. The manor lay on a tributary of the River Cherwell, and Harborne may well have been a fisherman. He was a friend of the publisher John Jackson, who published in 1623 a plan of Harborne's water garden in its completed state, by Gervase Markham in the third edition of his Cheape and good husbandry for the well-ordering of all beasts, and fowles, and for the generall cure of their diseases.

== Churches ==
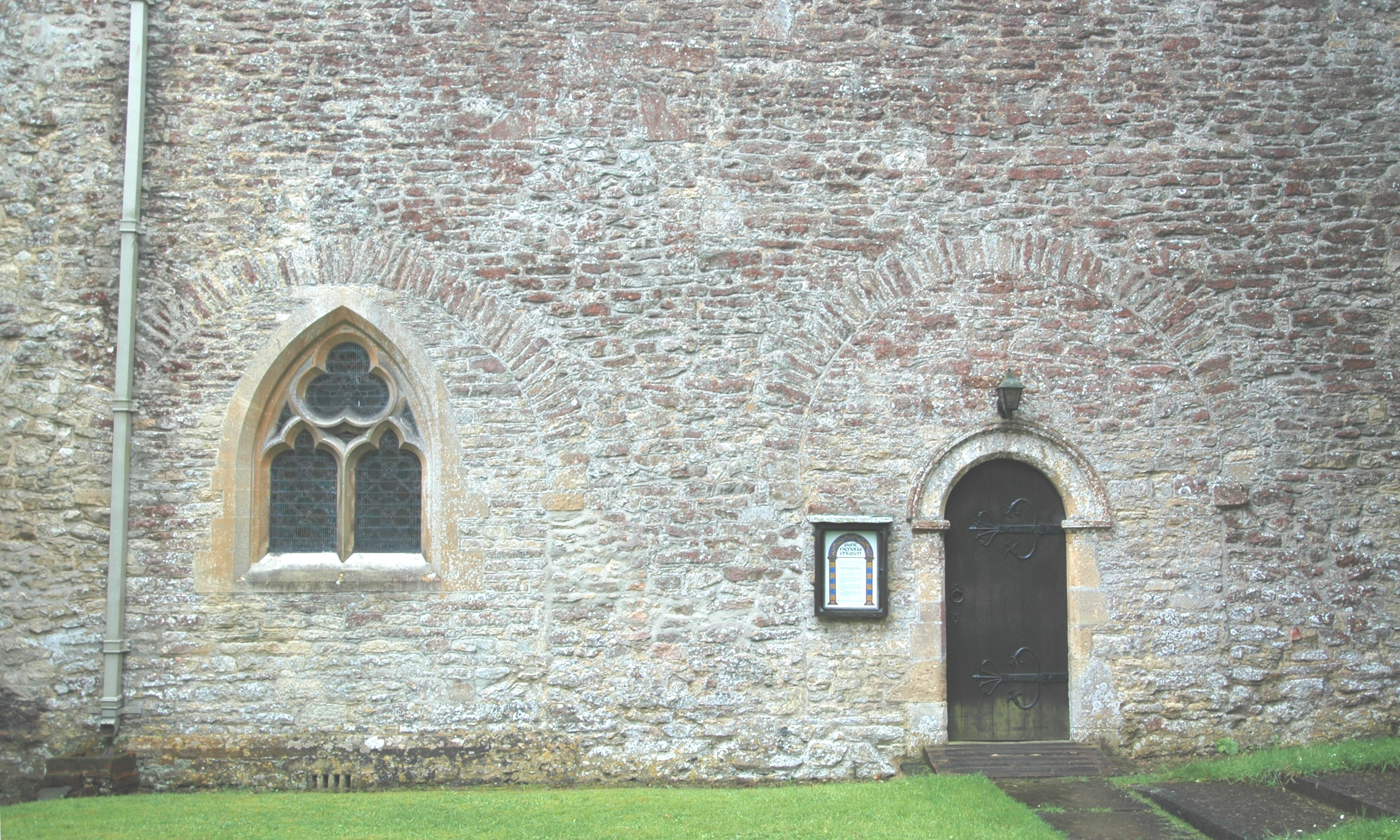
St Nicholas' parish church: blocked 11th-century Saxon arcade on the north side of the nave

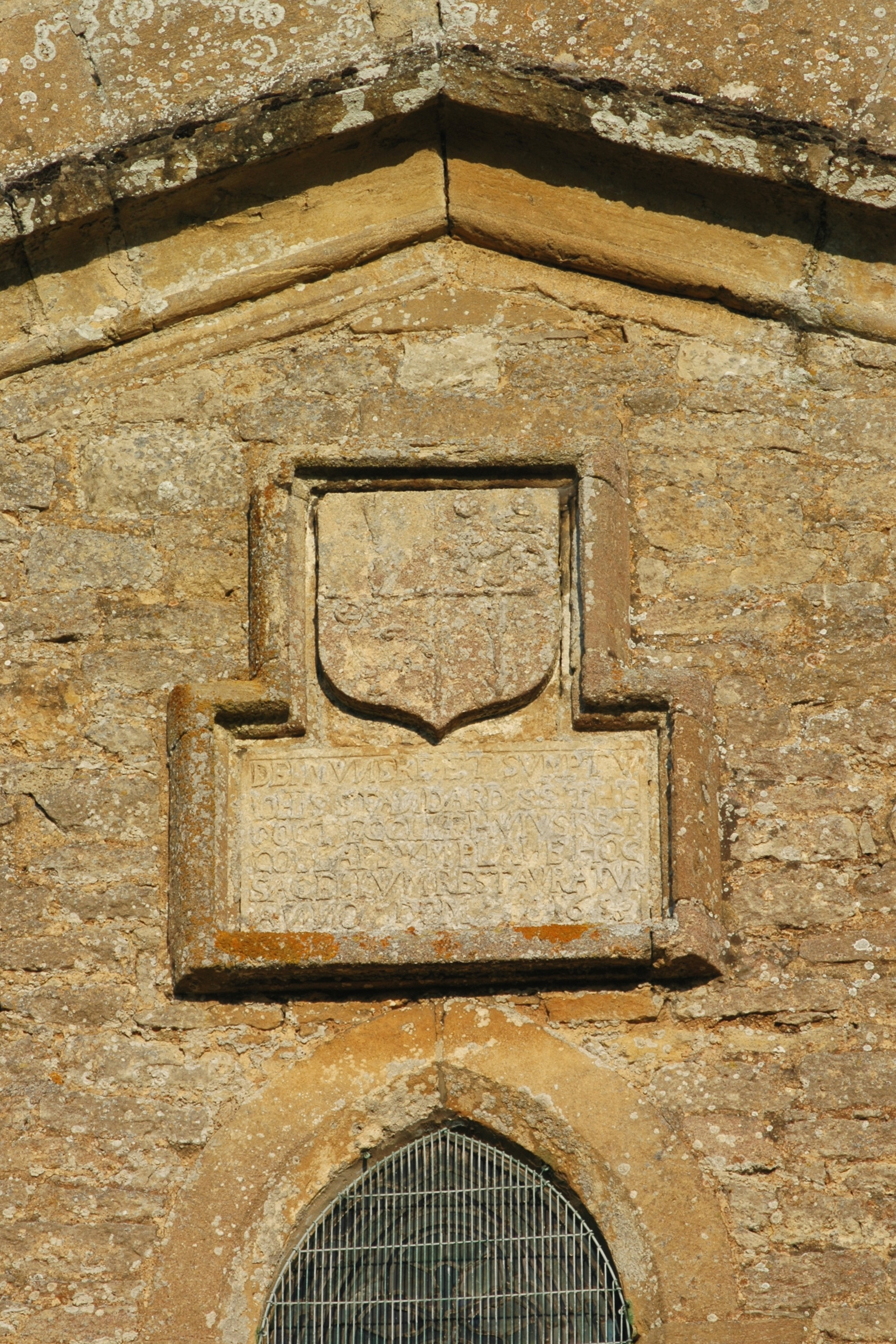
St Nicholas' parish church: 17th-century date stone under the chancel gable

=== Church of England ===
The Church of England parish church of Saint Nicholas is cruciform. It dates from the 11th century and has several remnants of its original Saxon stonework. The south aisle, east windows and lower part of the tower are 13th century. In the 15th century the Perpendicular Gothic clerestory and upper part of the tower were built and both transepts were rebuilt. The north transept was rebuilt again in 1616 as a family chapel for John Harbourne. In 1862 lightning struck and damaged the church, and in 1864 the Oxford Diocesan architect, the Gothic Revivalist G.E. Street directed a restoration of St. Nicholas' that the 20th century critics Jennifer Sherwood and Nikolaus Pevsner called "rather insensitive".

The church tower has a ring of six bells. Richard Keene of Woodstock cast the fifth and tenor bells in 1664 and the third bell in 1689. John Warner and Sons of Cripplegate, London cast the second and fourth bells in 1859. Mears and Stainbank of the Whitechapel Bell Foundry cast the treble bell in 1924. There is also a Sanctus bell that was cast by an unknown founder in 1792. In the 12th century both Osney Abbey and Eynsham Abbey acquired lands in the parish. Eynsham Abbey's holdings in Tackley included the watermill at Catsham (see below). However, by the time Thomas Cromwell made the Valor Ecclesiasticus for King Henry VIII in 1535, both abbeys had ceased to hold any property in the parish. From 1725 every Rector of Tackley was also a fellow of St John's College, Oxford. Several were distinguished scholars but most had several other parishes and were absentee rectors of Tackley. Since 1976 St. Nicholas' has belonged to a united Church of England Benefice with the neighbouring parishes of North Aston and Steeple Aston.

=== Methodist ===
Tackley Methodist church was converted from a barn built of local limestone and dedicated in 1808. A brick extension was added in the 1840s. Tackley's Anglicans and Methodists hold monthly ecumenical services together.

== Economic and social history ==
=== Mill and bridge ===
The Domesday Book records that in 1086 there was a watermill, Catsham Mill, on the River Cherwell between Tackley and Northbrook 1 mile (1.6 km) to the north. A second mill had been built at Catsham by 1176. A stream between Tackley and Nethercott was being used to power an overshot mill by 1622. In 1767 it was still in use and was called Pullback Mill, but it was disused by the 1840s. There was a bridge over the Cherwell at Catsham Mill. It was first recorded in 1338, needed repair by 1444 and had been replaced by a ford by 1617. A wooden bridge replaced it around 1637 and a stone bridge had been built again by 1750. Today neither the bridge nor Catsham Mill survive.

=== Land tenure ===
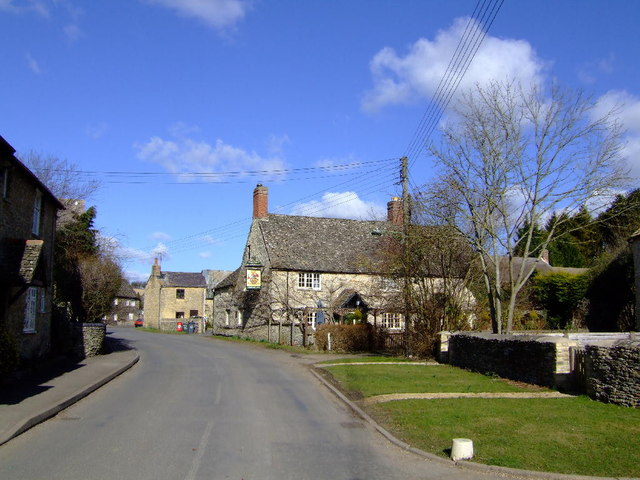
Tackley village

The parish originally shared a single open field system but later these were separated into two open field systems, one for each Tackley and Nethercott. Tackley's fields were enclosed in the 16th and 17th centuries but open-field farming survived in Nethercott until 1873. The landowners rejected enclosure proposals in 1849, 1853 and 1861. A scheme was finally agreed in 1873 and a Parliamentary Enclosure Act was passed for the parish. Balliol College, Oxford owned land at Nethercott and was one of the landowners who objected to the earlier enclosure proposals. Soon after the act was finally passed the college sold its holdings there. St. John's College, Oxford also owned land at Nethercott and objected to the earlier enclosure proposals. It sold its land to Corpus Christi College, Oxford in 1948 and 1953. A map of 1608 records a hamlet at Whitehill, 0.5 miles (800 m) south of Tackley village. Its lands were enclosed by Act of Parliament in 1795 and the hamlet seems to have quickly disappeared thereafter.

=== 17th and 18th centuries ===
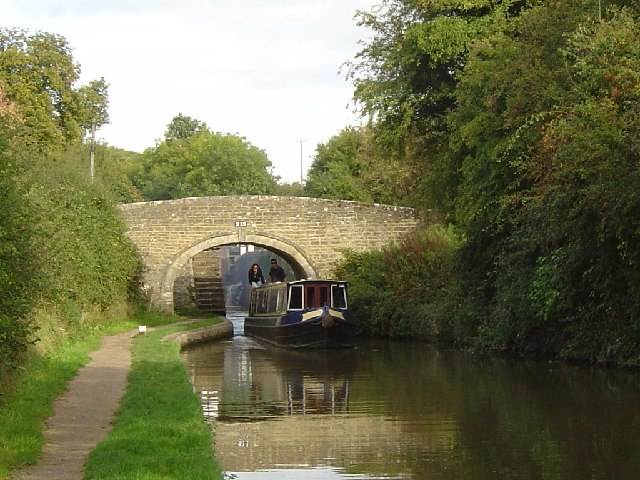
A narrowboat near Pigeon's Lock on the Oxford Canal

The earliest known record of a public house in Tackley dates from 1624. In 1774 the village had four public houses: the Ball, the Chequers, the Pole Axe and the Wheatsheaf. The Gardiner Arms dates from at least 1788 and the King's Arms in Nethercott was in business by the 1840s. Today the King's Arms is a private house and only the Gardiner Arms remains open. During the English Civil War in the 1640s a skirmish, "The Battle of Tackley", was fought on the banks of the River Cherwell. In 1787 the Oxford Canal was extended from Banbury down the Cherwell valley as far south as Northbrook lock, 1 mile (1.6 km) north of Tackley. In 1788 the canal was extended past Tackley to the outskirts of Oxford.

=== 19th century ===
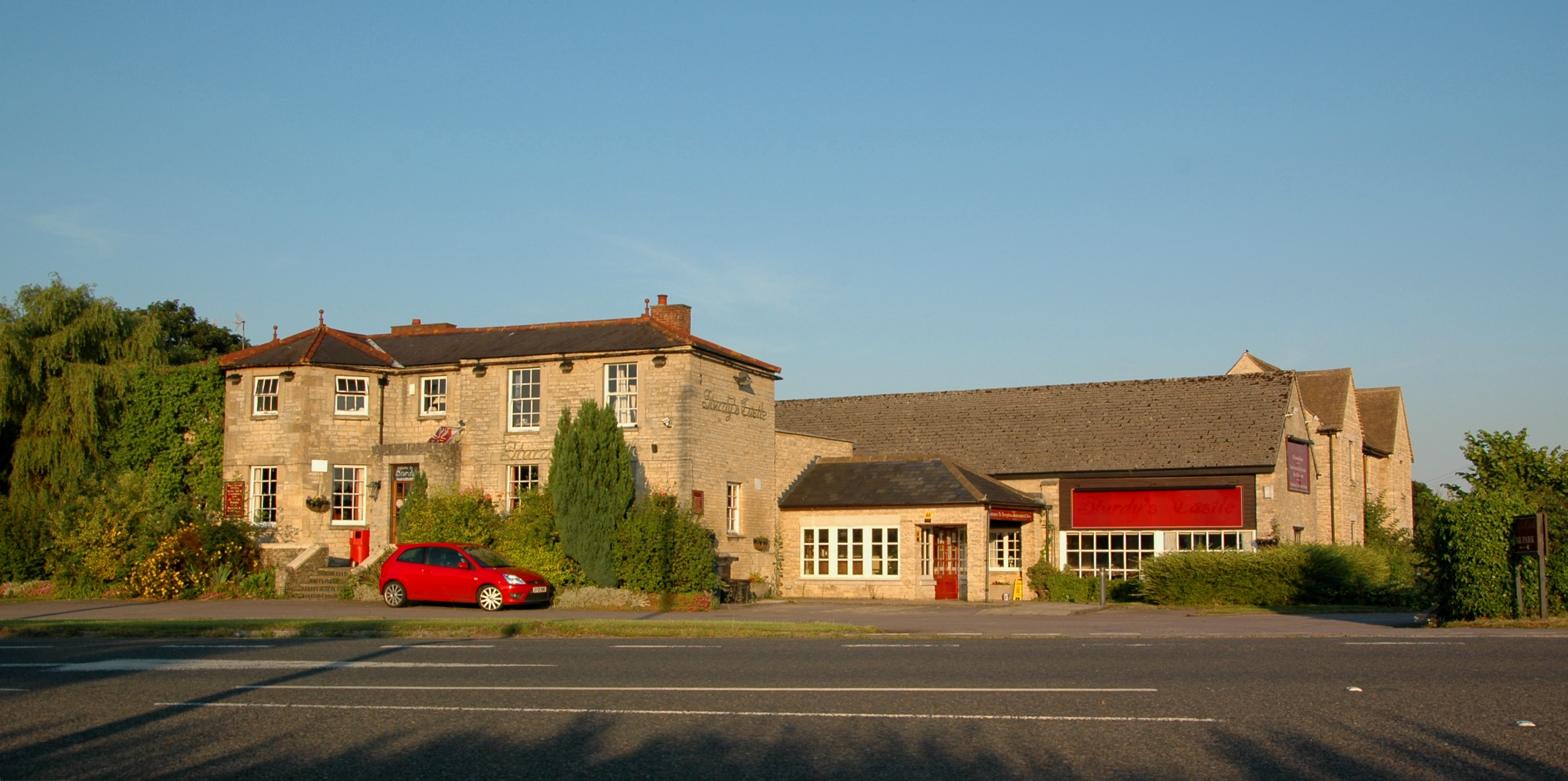
Sturdy's Castle public house, on the A4260 road just over 1 mile (1.6 km) southwest of the village

Early in the 19th century Tackley had two dame schools. In 1840 a National School was built on a site provided by St. John's College, Oxford. It was extended in 1861. In 1927 it was reorganised as a junior school, and senior pupils had to travel to Steeple Aston. It also became a Church of England controlled school. A new school building replaced the original one in 1965, but the school was closed in 1981. The Oxford and Rugby Railway between Oxford and Banbury was built past the village in 1848-1849 but the nearest rail station provided was Bletchington, which was actually at the hamlet of Enslow 1.5 miles (2.4 km) south of Tackley. The Great Western Railway took over the Oxford and Rugby Railway before the line opened, but did not open a halt for the village until 1931. It is at Nethercott but was named Tackley Halt. It is now called Tackley and is served by Great Western Railway's Oxford Canal Line services. A stone quarry was opened at Whitehill in the latter part of the 19th century but had closed by the middle of the 20th. It now contains wildlife for which it has been designated a site of special scientific interest.

=== 20th century ===
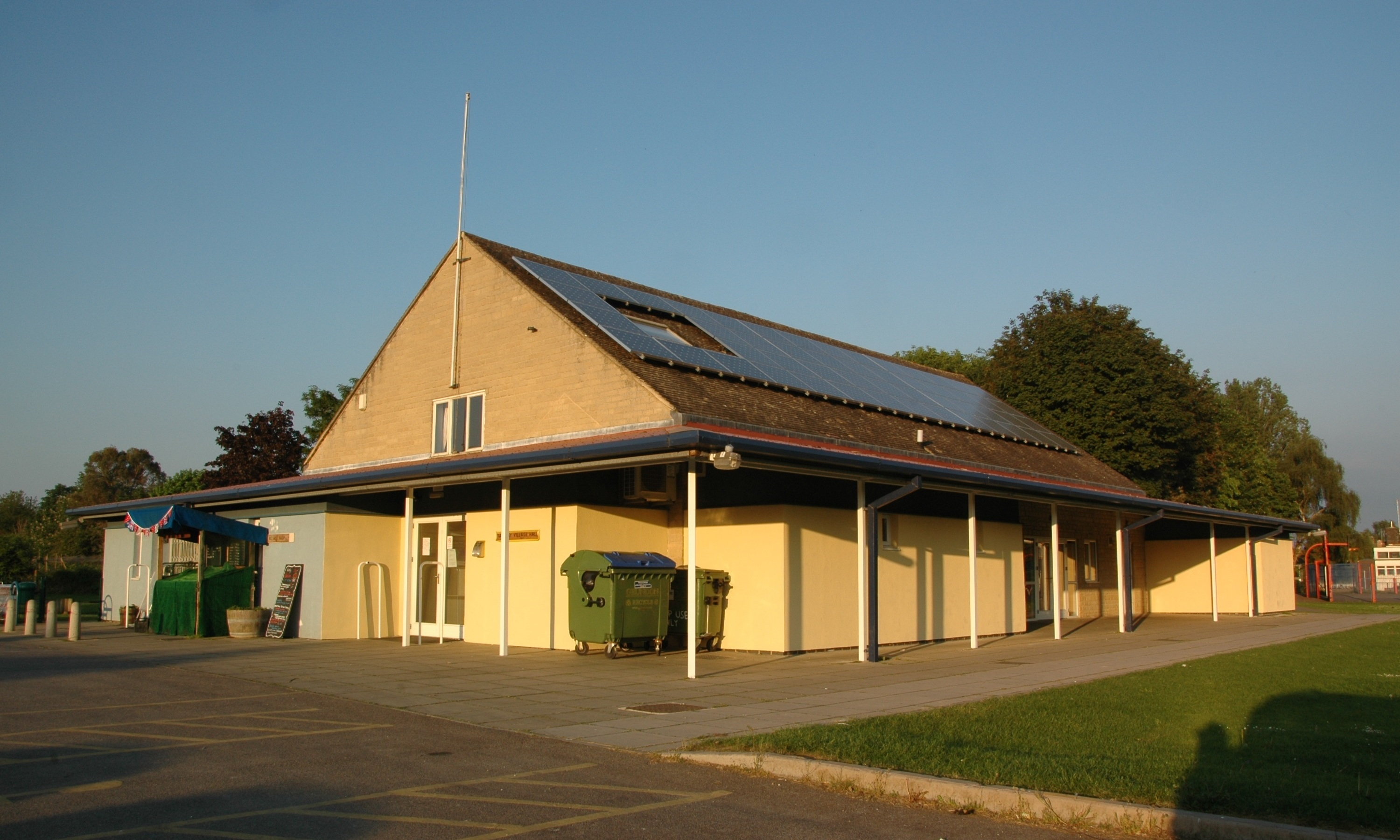
Since 2004 Tackley Village Hall has also housed a community shop and Post Office

Tackley Football Club was founded in 1907. It plays in Witney and District Football Association Division Two. Tackley also has a Cricket Club. The village, and especially the Nethercott neighbourhood, has expanded considerably since the railway station opened in 1931. It has evolved from a primarily agricultural community into one with a significant commuter population. In the south of the parish on Whitehill overlooking the River Cherwell is a satellite ground station that the Marconi Company built for Mercury Communications in 1986. Mercury was absorbed by its parent company Cable & Wireless in 1997, which continues to operate the station. Tackley's last shops closed in 2001, so in 2004 the community opened a shop and post office, which share premises with the village hall and are partly staffed by volunteers.

== Air crash ==
On Thursday 13 July 2006 a Royal Air Force Harrier GR9 aircraft flying from RAF Cottesmore to RAF Fairford crashed about 1.2 miles (2 km) west of Tackley, near Sturdy's Castle public house. It would appear that the pilot having had a problem, and seeing Woodstock ahead, managed to turn around and eject at a low height. The pilot ejected and survived uninjured. An off-duty policeman who was driving close to the scene of the crash suffered shock when his car was hit by debris. The Oxford – Banbury A4260 road was closed for several days as the crash was investigated and a team from MOD St Athan removed the wreckage.

== Women's Institute ==
Court Farm Barns are now the headquarters of the Oxfordshire Federation of Women's Institutes.

== Notable residents ==
- Julian Evetts (1911–1996), cricketer; grandson of the below
- William Evetts (1847–1936), cricketer; grandfather of the above
- The tenor Anthony Rolfe Johnson (1940–2010) was born in Tackley.
- The composer David Whitaker (1931–2012) lived in Tackley.
- Footballer Christian Pulisic lived in Tackley for a year when he was seven years old.

== Sources ==
- Compton, Hugh J. (1976). The Oxford Canal. Newton Abbot: David & Charles. p. 37. ISBN 0-7153-7238-6.
- Baggs, A.P.; Colvin, Christina; Colvin, H.M.; Cooper, Janet; Day, C.J.; Selwyn, Nesta; Tomkinson, A. (1983). Crossley, Alan (ed.). A History of the County of Oxford. Victoria County History. Vol. 11: Wootton Hundred (northern part). London: Oxford University Press for the Institute of Historical Research. pp. 194–208. ISBN 978-0-19722-758-9.
- Markham, Gervase (1623) [1616]. Cheape and good husbandry for the well-ordering of all beasts, and fowles, and for the generall cure of their diseases. Contayning the natures, breeding, choise, vse, feeding, and curing of the diseases of all manner of cattell, as horse, oxe, cow, sheepe, goates, swine, and tame conies. John Jackson. p. 145.
- Rowley, Trevor (1978). Villages in the Landscape. Archaeology in the Field Series. London: J.M. Dent & Sons Ltd. p. 186. ISBN 0-460-04166-5.
- Sherwood, Jennifer; Pevsner, Nikolaus (1974). Oxfordshire. The Buildings of England. Harmondsworth: Penguin Books. pp. 692–693. ISBN 0-14-071045-0.
- Sherwood, Jennifer (1989). A Guide to the Churches of Oxfordshire. Oxford: Robert Dugdale in association with Oxfordshire Historic Churches Trust. pp. 184–185. ISBN 0-946976-03-1.
- Whittle, Elisabeth; Taylor, Christopher (1994). "The Early-Seventeenth Century Gardens of Tackley, Oxfordshire". Garden History. 22 (1). Garden History Society: 37–63. doi:10.2307/1587001. JSTOR 1587001.
