= Oxfordshire Historic Churches Trust =

British charity

- The area covered by OHCT within England
- Abbreviation: OHCT
- Named after: Oxfordshire
- Formation: 1964
- Founded at: Oxfordshire
- Type: Nonprofit
- Legal status: charity
- Purpose: Historic church preservation
- Location: Oxford, United Kingdom
- Region served: Oxfordshire
- Products: Publications
- Services: Grants
- Methods: Events
- Fields: Cultural heritage
- Official language: English
- Chairman: Stephen Goss
- Secretary: Richard Hughes
- Treasurer: Giles Dessain
- Grants Officer: Cynthia Robinson
- Publication: Annual Review
- Parent organization: National Churches Trust
- Funding: Donations
- Website: ohct.org.uk

The Oxfordshire Historic Churches Trust (OHCT) provides financial support with repairs and certain improvements to churches and chapels in Oxfordshire, England, without regard to their denomination.

ONCT encourages interest in Oxfordshire churches and chapels and undertakes fundraising, partly through an annual sponsored 'Ride & Stride' event held in September, and through JustGiving.

The Trust was established in 1964. Sir Hugo Brunner, formerly Lord Lieutenant of Oxfordshire, has been a Trustee of OHCT and has helped with fund-raising activities, including formal openings. By 2011, the value of the Trust's grants to churches and chapels had amounted to around £3.5 million. The chairman at the time since 1999, Christopher H. Walton, received an MBE for raising and distributing more than £2 million for Oxfordshire churches in his work for the Trust. In 2016, it was announced that the Trust's 2014 Jubilee Campaign (50 years after its establishment) had raised £3 million in donations of cash and legacies, helping churches such as St Mary's Church, Chalgrove. In 2024, the Trust provided finance to help with urgent repairs of St Mary's Church, Bampton, which featured in the television drama series Downton Abbey.

As part of its activities, OHCT produces publications related to historic churches in Oxfordshire.
