= Hugo Brunner =

British politician

Sir Hugo Brunner KCVO KStJ JP
- Born: 17 August 1935 (age 91)
- Parent(s): Sir Felix Brunner, 3rd Bt; Elizabeth Irving
- Relatives: Irving Family

Sir Hugo Laurence Joseph Brunner (born 17 August 1935) was Lord Lieutenant of Oxfordshire, England, between 1996 and 2008. He was succeeded by Tim Stevenson. He was also a Liberal Party politician.

Hugo Brunner is the son of Sir Felix Brunner, 3rd Bt. (1897–1982), and Elizabeth Irving (1904–2003), the granddaughter of the Victorian era actor-manager Henry Irving.

He contested the Torquay division of Devon for the Liberal Party at the 1964 General Election and the 1966 General Election.

Brunner was appointed High Sheriff of Oxfordshire in 1988 and Lord Lieutenant of Oxfordshire in 1996. He has been an enthusiastic supporter of the installation of blue plaques through his chairmanship of the Oxfordshire Blue Plaques Board, established in 1999 and administered by the Oxford Civic Society.

Brunner was awarded the honorary degree of Doctor of Laws by Oxford Brookes University in 1999. His family home was Greys Court in south Oxfordshire and he now lives in North Oxford.

Brunner was appointed a Knight of Justice of the Order of St John in 2001 and a Knight Commander of the Royal Victorian Order (KCVO) in the 2008 Birthday Honours.

== See also ==
- Irving Family

Honorary titles
Preceded by Frederick Roger Goodenough	High Sheriff of Oxfordshire; 1988	Succeeded by Charles George Archibald Parker
Preceded by Sir Ashley Ponsonby, Bt	Lord Lieutenant of Oxfordshire; 1996–2008	Succeeded by Tim Stevenson
