= Laurence Irving (set designer) =

Laurence Irving OBE RDI
- Laurence Irving in 1947
- Born: Laurence Henry Forster Irving; 11 April 1897
- Died: 23 October 1988 (aged 91)
- Occupation: Artist
- Spouse: Rosalind Frances Woolner (m. 1920)
- Children: 2
- Parent(s): H. B. Irving; Dorothea Baird

Squadron Leader Laurence Henry Forster Irving (11 April 1897 – 23 October 1988) was an artist, book illustrator and Hollywood set designer and art director, the son of actors H. B. Irving and Dorothea Baird, and the biographer of his grandfather, the Victorian era actor Henry Irving. His sister was the actress and founder of the Keep Britain Tidy Campaign, Elizabeth Irving. He lived and died in Wittersham, Kent in 1988, within walking distance of the house, Smallhythe Place, where Dame Ellen Terry lived, who was his grandfather's leading lady at the Lyceum Theatre in London's West End.

== Biography ==
Named after his uncle, Laurence Sydney Brodribb Irving, Laurence Irving was born in London in 1897. He briefly and unhappily attended Wellington College and later trained as a painter at the Byam Shaw School of Art and the Royal Academy School, studying under Charles Ricketts and Charles Shannon. On completion of his art training Irving specialised in landscape and marine painting before commencing on his career as a designer for the theatre. He was a pilot in the Royal Naval Air Service (RNAS) during World War I, ending the War with the rank of Captain. In 1919 he became engaged to Rosalind Frances Woolner, the granddaughter of the Pre-Raphaelite sculptor Thomas Woolner and daughter of Hugh Woolner, a stockbroker and survivor of the Titanic disaster. They married in 1920.

He started designing scenery and costumes for stage productions in the 1920s, including Vaudeville Vanities and The Five O'Clock Girl. He also designed the original London production of T. S. Eliot's Murder in the Cathedral as well as plays by Frederick Lonsdale, J. B. Priestly and Ben Travers.

Irving was also a book illustrator, producing artwork for Richard Hakluyt's Voyages & Discoveries of the English (1926) and John Masefield's Philip the King (1927). In 1928 Irving went to Hollywood with Douglas Fairbanks to be his Art Director on The Iron Mask (1929), the last of his full-scale silent films and, later, in collaboration with William Cameron Menzies, to design the production of a film version of The Taming of the Shrew (1929). He was the Art Director for the films 77 Park Lane (1931) and Colonel Blood (1934). In his memoirs, Irving recounts working in Hollywood for such figures as Mary Pickford and Charlie Chaplin. On his return to the United Kingdom in the 1930s, he worked on films such as Moonlight Sonata (1937) and the Gabriel Pascal films of Shaw's Pygmalion (1938) and Major Barbara (1941).

Irving was recalled to the R.A.F. in October 1939 at the start of World War II to serve in the Intelligence Department at the Air Ministry. In March 1940 he was posted to H.Q. British Air Forces in France to be responsible for writing official communiqués and persuading accredited war correspondents to abide by the principle of censorship accepted by their editors. After the surrender of France he returned to the Air Ministry convinced that the system of local defence could have brought the German armoured thrust to a halt. A memorandum he wrote to this effect led to his posting as a Staff Officer to H.Q. 12 Corps., then sparsely equipped to repel a German invasion, to help Peter Fleming to recruit and train an underground force of saboteurs to harass the enemy if a bridgehead was established in Kent and Sussex. When South Eastern Command took control of military operations in that area it was allotted an R.A.F. reconnaissance Wing of three Squadrons and an Air Staff to promote Army/Air co-operation. As Senior Intelligence Officer of 35 Wing, Irving studied and furthered the technical and tactical resources of low level photographic and reconnaissance and the prompt distribution of intelligence derived from it. He ended the War as a Squadron Leader.

After the War he was invited by J. Arthur Rank to produce and design the film adaptation of Sheridan Le Fanu's Uncle Silas (1947). Laurence Irving wrote the biographies Henry Irving, the Actor and his World and The Successors, and two volumes of autobiography, Designing for the Movies: the Memoirs of Laurence Irving, and Great Interruption: An Autobiography 1938-45 (1983).

Irving was the father of John H. B. Irving and Pamela Mary Irving.

== See also ==
- Irving Family
