= Sir Felix Brunner, 3rd Baronet =

British politician and business owner

Felix Brunner

Sir Felix John Morgan Brunner, 3rd Baronet (13 October 1897 – 2 November 1982) was a British Liberal Party politician and business owner. He was the maternal uncle of Katharine, Duchess of Kent.

== Biography ==
The son of Sir John Brunner, 2nd Baronet, he studied at Cheltenham College and Trinity College, Oxford. During World War I, he served as a lieutenant in the Royal Field Artillery.

In 1926, Brunner married Elizabeth Irving, an actress, the granddaughter of Sir Henry Irving. In 1928 he submitted plans for extensive alterations and additions to Rudloe Manor, in Box, Wiltshire using Rolfe & Peto. He later sold the property at an auction in the city of Bath on 1st July 1931. In 1937 they bought Greys Court in Oxfordshire, and donated the house to the National Trust in 1969 but continued to live there.

Brunner followed in a family tradition by standing for election for the Liberal Party: in Hulme in 1924, Chippenham in 1929, and Northwich in 1945, but was never elected to Parliament. He was elected to Henley Rural District Council, and served as its chairman from 1954 to 1957. He was also President of the Liberal Party in 1962/3.

Brunner was also a supporter of the Open Spaces Society, chairing it from 1958 to 1970.

Brunner's children include John Henry Kilian, the fourth baronet between 1982 and 2015, and Hugo, a former Lord-Lieutenant of Oxfordshire.

Party political offices
Preceded by Edwin Malindine	President of the Liberal Party; 1962–1963	Succeeded by David Rees-Williams
Baronetage of the United Kingdom
Preceded by John Brunner	Baronet of Druids Cross, Lancashire; 1929–1982	Succeeded by John Henry Kilian Brunner
