= Tim Stevenson (Lord Lieutenant) =

English barrister (born 1948)

Sir Timothy Stevenson KCVO OBE CStJ DL
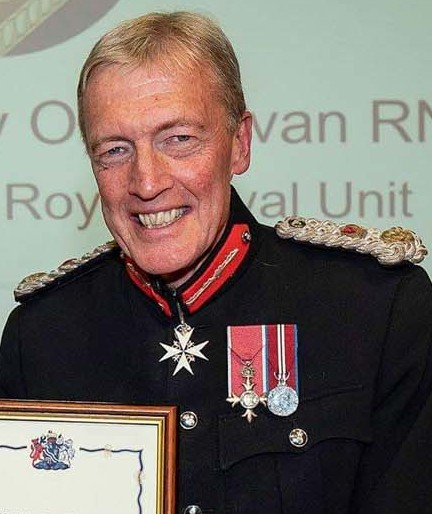
- Born: 14 May 1948 (age 78); Surrey, England
- Education: Canford School
- Alma mater: Worcester College, Oxford (BA)
- Occupations: Barrister, businessman
- Years active: 1971-2021
- Spouse: Marion Johnston

Sir Timothy Edwin Paul Stevenson KCVO OBE CStJ (born 14 May 1948) was Lord Lieutenant of Oxfordshire, England between 2008 and 2021. A qualified barrister, he is also a businessman and former chairman of Johnson Matthey plc.

== Early life ==
Stevenson was born on 14 May 1948 in Surrey, England, to Pamela (née Jervelund) and Derek Paul Stevenson. He was educated at Canford School, a private school in near Wimborne Minster, Dorset. He went on to study law at Worcester College, University of Oxford. He graduated Bachelor of Arts (BA) in Jurisprudence, which was later promoted to Master of Arts (MA). In 1971, he was called to the Bar and became a member of the Inner Temple. This qualified him as a barrister.

== Career ==
Stevenson practised law for a short time following his qualification as a barrister, before beginning a 25-year career in industry.

Between 1993 and 1998, he was chief executive of Castrol International and chief executive of Burmah Castrol PLC from 1998 to 2000. He has taken on a number of non-executive director positions: between 1997 and 2004, of the Department for Education and Skills; between 2000 and 2004, of Partnerships UK; and of Tribal Group from 2004 to 2008. He became Chairman of Morgan Crucible in December 2006. In March 2011 he joined Johnson Matthey as chairman designate. His appointment as chairman was confirmed in July 2011. He was succeeded by Patrick Thomas in 2018.

== Personal life ==
Stevenson married Marion Johnston in 1973. Johnston is a family mediator and trainer for National Family Mediation and was previously the director of the Oxfordshire Family Mediation Service. Together they have three daughters.

On 1 September 2008, he was appointed Lord Lieutenant of Oxfordshire, thereby becoming Queen Elizabeth II's personal representative in the county. He retired on 30 September 2021 with Marjorie Glasgow replacing him.

== Honours ==

Stevenson was appointed Officer of the Order of the British Empire (OBE) in the 2004 Birthday Honours for services to education, and Commander of the Order of St John (CStJ) in May 2010. He was appointed Knight Commander of the Royal Victorian Order (KCVO) in the 2021 Birthday Honours.

Honorary titles
Preceded by Sir Hugo Brunner	Lord Lieutenant of Oxfordshire; 2008-2021	Succeeded by Marjorie Glasgow
