= Dorothea Baird =

English actress (1875–1933)

- Baird in the title role of the original production of Trilby, 1895
- Born: 20 May 1875; Teddington, Middlesex, England
- Died: 24 September 1933 (aged 58); Broadstairs, Kent, England
- Spouse: H. B. Irving (m. 1896; died 1919)
- Children: Laurence; Elizabeth

Dorothea Baird (20 May 1875 – 24 September 1933) was an English stage and film actress, and, in her retirement, an activist for infant welfare.

== Career ==
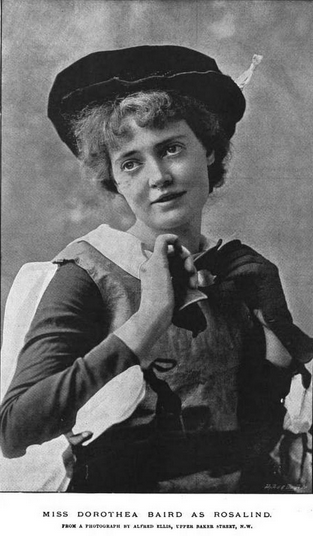
Dorothea Baird as Rosalind, from an 1896 publication.

Her first stage appearance was with the Oxford University Dramatic Society in February 1894, when she played Iris in The Tempest. She was seen there by Lewis Carroll. On 26 May, he took her to London to see Ellen Terry performing, and then took her backstage to meet Ellen Terry. This inspired her to become a professional actress where she met her future husband, H. B. Irving.

She went on to appear in a number of plays by Shakespeare with her husband. She made her London debut in 1894 as Hippolyta in Ben Greet's production of A Midsummer Night's Dream. In 1895, she played the lead role in Herbert Beerbohm Tree's stage play Trilby at the Haymarket Theatre, an adaptation of the novel of the same name by George du Maurier.

She portrayed Mrs. Darling in the original 1904 production of Peter Pan, or The Boy Who Wouldn't Grow Up. In 1910 Baird was performing in The Princess Clementina, a George Pleydell stage version of an A. E. W. Mason novel. In her role as Jenny, Baird performed the character as a socially pointed comic relief. This is suggested by lines such as "She swore more loudly than she had wept … she struck at his head with her fist… And what do you make of me? A maggot?"

In 1913, she retired from the stage, due to a miscarriage, and involved herself in charitable causes, especially with infant welfare. In her retirement Baird put her attention towards family at a London's health centre known as the St. Pancras School for Mothers, of which she was a board member for many years. The first report from the school in 1907 shows that H.B. was an honorary treasurer and Baird had contributed £2.2.00. In 1908 the second report showed that Baird was involved in organising a tea party, along with entertainment, for 78 mothers and their babies. She raised £15.0.0 with the sales of autographs and speaking at a prize event. Baird and her husband then raised £157.9s.11d with a special performance of the play Charles the First. The purpose of the school was to provide mothers with advice and information along with home visits and babies health care. Baird was elected as a member of the St. Pancras Poor Law Guardians in 1913. While on this committee she used audiovisual education such as magic lantern slides for a fathers evening. According to a report on Bairds time on the committee, she used these slides to show the effects bad housing conditions on infants.

In 1917, Baird used her theatre and film experience to create the film Motherhood. With the help of Percy Nash, Baird created Motherhood to try to help improve the living habits of mothers and infants. The film itself draws from the St. Pancras Poor Law Guardians program in which it shows a newly married Mary (Lettie Paxton), cleaning her house and breathing in laundry fumes. Mary is then violently confronted by her husband Jack (Jack Denton) which causes her health visitor, played by Baird, to intervene. Baird's character introduces Mary to a School for Mothers, where once pregnant, Mary chooses the advice of a certified nurse rather than her grandmother. This reflects the 1917 health goal of teaching women to choose good advice rather than advice passed down by an older generation. Baird used the film Motherhood to create political demands for social improvement. She used her fame and on-screen promotions to "better the women of Britain."

== Personal life ==
Baird was the daughter of Sir John Forster Baird, a prominent English barrister-at-law. She married Henry Brodribb Irving, son of Sir Henry Irving, in 1896, and, together, they had two children, Laurence Forster Irving in 1897 and Elizabeth Irving in 1904.

After the death of Sir Henry Irving in 1905, Baird and H.B. decided to form their own theatre company.

== Sources ==
- "Dorothea Baird". Stars of the Edwardian Stage.
- Holroyd, Michael (2008): A Strange Eventful History; The Dramatic Lives of Ellen Terry, Henry Irving and their Remarkable Families; Pub. Chatto & Windus ISBN 9780701179878
