= Elizabeth Irving =

British actress

Elizabeth Irving OBE, JP
- Elizabeth, Lady Brunner in 1953
- Born: 14 April 1904
- Died: 9 January 2003 (aged 98)
- Occupation: Actress
- Spouse: Felix Brunner (m. 1926; died 1982)
- Children: 5, including Hugo Brunner
- Parent(s): H. B. Irving; Dorothea Baird

Dorothea Elizabeth Irving, Lady Brunner (14 April 1904 – 9 January 2003), was a British actress, the daughter of actors H. B. Irving and Dorothea Baird, and the granddaughter of Victorian era stage star Henry Irving. Her older brother was the Hollywood set designer and art director Laurence Irving. Elizabeth Irving was the Chairman of the National Federation of Women's Institutes (W.I.) and in 1955 founded the Keep Britain Tidy Group, acting as President of the Group for 19 years from 1966.

== Life ==
Born at 1 Upper Woburn Place, London, in 1904, Dorothea Elizabeth Irving usually went by her middle name of Elizabeth. She was educated at home, at South Hampstead High School and, when the family moved to Oxford in 1916, at Oxford High School, before moving to Wycombe Abbey School. Irving left school at 16 to study acting in Oxford and London, making her stage debut aged 12 in The Bells, in which her father had a leading role. Her early roles as an adult actress were as Titania in A Midsummer Night's Dream, in Henrik Ibsen's The Pretenders and in George du Maurier's Trilby. She also had a role in A. V. Bramble's silent film version of Charlotte Brontë's Shirley (1922).

She married Sir Felix Brunner, Baronet, (1897–1982), a businessman and the son of Sir John Fowler Brunner, 2nd Bt. and Lucy Marianne Vaughan Morgan, on 8 July 1926. They had five sons. After her marriage Irving gave up acting, and became Lady Brunner in 1929 on the death of her husband's father, the 2nd baronet. She held the office of Justice of the Peace (J.P.) for Oxfordshire in 1946. In 1937 they bought Greys Court in Oxfordshire, and donated the house to the National Trust in 1969 but continued to live there.

From 1951 to 1956 she was the Chairman of the National Federation of Women's Institutes (W.I.) and in 1955 founded the Keep Britain Tidy Group. She was President of the group for 19 years from 1966, after which she was its senior vice-president. She was appointed an Officer of the Order of the British Empire (O.B.E.) in 1964 for her work with the Keep Britain Tidy Campaign. She was the Chairman of the Women's Group on Public Welfare for ten years from 1960, and Chairman of the Henley and District Housing Trust. From 1968 to 1971 she was a member of the General Advisory Council of the BBC. The Brunner Buildings at Denman College, the Women's Institute's own Residential Adult Education College near Oxford, are named after her.

Elizabeth Lady Brunner died of heart failure at her home, Greys Court, in Rotherfield Greys, Oxfordshire on 9 January 2003 aged 98.

One of her three surviving sons is Sir Hugo Brunner KCVO JP, Lord Lieutenant of Oxfordshire, England, between 1996 and 2008. He edited her posthumous account of her childhood to the point when she made her stage debut and published it, with a summary of the rest of her life, in 2010 as Child of the Theatre (Perpetua Press, Oxford).

== See also ==
- Irving family
