= Julian Evetts =

English cricketer

Personal information
- Full name: Julian Arthur Evetts
- Born: 24 November 1911; Tackley, Oxfordshire, England
- Died: 25 February 1996 (aged 84); Oxford, Oxfordshire, England
- Batting: Right-handed
- Relatives: William Evetts (grandfather)

Domestic team information
- Years: Team
- 1930–1933: Oxfordshire
- 1933: Oxford University

Career statistics
Competition	First-class
Matches	1
Runs scored	0
Batting average	0.00
100s/50s	0/0
Top score	0
Catches/stumpings	0/–
- Source: Cricinfo, 23 June 2019

Julian Arthur Evetts (24 November 1911 – 25 February 1996) was an English first-class cricketer.

Evetts was born at Tackley in Oxfordshire. He was educated at Westminster School, before going up to Brasenose College, Oxford. He debuted in minor counties cricket for Oxfordshire in the 1930 Minor Counties Championship, with Evetts playing minor counties cricket for Oxfordshire until 1933, making a total of 26 appearances in the Minor Counties Championship. While studying at Oxford he made a single appearance in first-class cricket for Oxford University against the Free Foresters at Oxford in 1933. Batting once in the match, he was dismissed without scoring by Raymond Robertson-Glasgow in the Oxford first-innings. He later served as a colonial official in Southern Rhodesia. He died at Oxford in February 1996. His grandfather, William Evetts, was also a first-class cricketer.
