= H. B. Irving =

British actor-manager

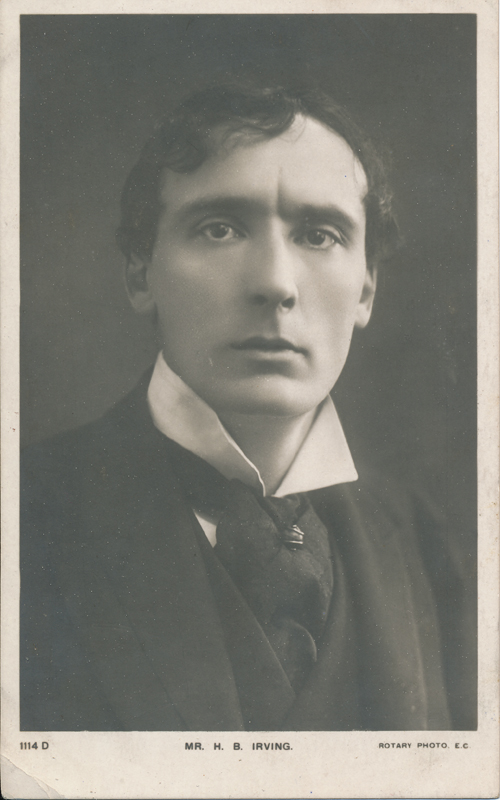
- Born: 5 August 1870; London, England
- Died: 17 October 1919 (aged 49); London, England
- Other name: Harry
- Spouse: Dorothea Baird (m. 1896)
- Children: Laurence; Elizabeth
- Parents: Henry Irving (father); Florence O'Callaghan (mother)
- Relatives: Laurence Irving (brother)

Henry Brodribb Irving (5 August 1870 – 17 October 1919) was a British stage actor and actor-manager; the eldest son of Sir Henry Irving and his wife Florence (née O'Callaghan), and father of designer Laurence Irving and actress Elizabeth Irving.

== Early life ==
Although, as a child, he appeared a couple of times in his father's productions, it was intended that he would become a lawyer. He attended Marlborough College and New College, Oxford where he studied law and appeared in some student productions. Afterwards, in 1894, he was called to the Bar at the Inner Temple, but instead of pursuing a career as a barrister he decided to become an actor, taking the stage name H. B. Irving to distinguish himself from his father.

== Career ==
His first appearance on the stage, at age of twenty-one, was at the Garrick Theatre, London, in School. In 1906 he toured with success throughout the United States, appearing in plays made memorable by his father, The Lyons Mail, Charles I, and The Bells. In 1905 he gave a lecture, largely autobiographical, to the Academy of Dramatic Art in London. Inevitably, his early years as an actor were spent in the shadow of his father, especially as, at first, he was a member of Sir Henry Irving's Company.

In 1896, he married Dorothea Baird, who, after playing the part of Trilby the year before, was, at that time, the best-known actress in Britain. Irving and Dorothea had a son Laurence, who became a well-known Hollywood art director, and a daughter Elizabeth. He continued as part of his father's company, but soon felt the need to branch out. In 1898, he joined George Alexander at the St James's Theatre where he played Don John in Much Ado About Nothing, and appeared in the surprising hit, The Ambassador, a play written by Pearl Mary Teresa Craigie.

For the following seven years, the couple, selecting the parts that appealed to them, moved between companies, sometimes together and sometimes separately. In 1900, they both appeared in Beerbohm Tree's production of A Midsummer Night's Dream that ran for 153 performances at Her Majesty's Theatre.

In 1904, only a year before his father's sudden death on 13 October 1905, Irving played Hamlet for the first time. The production by Otho Stuart, which was a popular success, was presented at the Adelphi Theatre, with Oscar Asche as Claudius, Walter Hampden as Laertes and Lily Brayton as Ophelia.

After his father's death, he established his own company, which included his wife, and toured most provincial cities, playing mainly repeats of Sir Henry Irving's best remembered performances. For the opening night of the new King's Theatre in Southsea he presented Charles I, The Bells and The Lyons Mail. Occasionally, other plays were presented including, most successfully, Dr Jekyll and Mr Hyde at the Queen's Theatre, London. Film historian Troy Howarth writes "Some sources credit (Irving), who played Jekyll and Hyde on stage, as the director of The Duality of Man (a 1910 British film adaptation of the Jekyll and Hyde story)....".

In 1911, Irving, Baird and their London Company toured Australia, again presenting Hamlet. Two years later, Baird retired from the stage, while Irving kept on performing. In 1913 he visited South Africa, and a photograph records his dinner with the Owl Club in Cape Town. In 1914, he appeared with Basil Rathbone in The Sin of David at the Savoy Theatre.

== Later life ==
During World War I, Irving withdrew from the theatre and returned to the law, writing the study for which he is now most famous, A Book of Remarkable Criminals, originally published in 1918, which examined the lives, motivations and crimes of some infamous murderers. He had already published Life of Judge Jeffreys, and Studies of French Criminals and other papers on the subject. After spending twenty years of his life dedicated to the theatre, his greatest success came from being what it was intended he should be, a legal expert.

Irving was a founding member of Arthur Conan Doyle's Our Society, along with Arthur Diósy, the author J. B. Atlay, the coroner Ingleby Oddie, and others. Originally named "Crimes Club", it continues to flourish in London, where criminals and criminology are discussed at regularly held dinners.

He died on 17 October 1919, at his residence in Cumberland Terrace, Regent's Park, following a long illness.

== Selected filmography ==
- The Duality of Man (1910, director)
- The Lyons Mail (1916)

== See also ==
- Irving Family
