= William Evetts =

English cricketer

Personal information
- Full name: William Evetts
- Born: 30 June 1847; Tackley, Oxfordshire, England
- Died: 7 April 1936 (aged 88); Tackley, Oxfordshire, England
- Height: 6 ft 0 in (1.83 m)
- Batting: Right-handed
- Relatives: Julian Evetts (grandson)

Domestic team information
- Years: Team
- 1868–1869: Oxford University
- 1870–1882: Marylebone Cricket Club

Career statistics
Competition	First-class
Matches	22
Runs scored	531
Batting average	15.61
100s/50s	1/2
Top score	102
Catches/stumpings	4/–
- Source: Cricinfo, 2 March 2020

William Evetts (30 June 1847 – 7 April 1936) was an English first-class cricketer.

The son of William Evetts senior, he was born in June 1847 at Tackley, Oxfordshire. He was educated at Harrow School, before going up to Brasenose College, Oxford. While studying at Oxford, Evetts played first-class cricket for Oxford University in 1868 and 1869, making nine appearances. A free hitting batsman, he scored 333 runs for Oxford at an average of 23.78, with a high score of 102. His 102 came against Surrey at The Oval in 1868 and was made in under two hours. Shortly after graduating from Oxford, Evetts appeared for the Marylebone Cricket Club (MCC) in first-class cricket in 1870. He played first-class cricket for the MCC until 1882, making thirteen appearances and scoring 198 runs with a high score of 57. Evetts was by profession a farmer. He died at Tackley in April 1936. His grandson, Julian Evetts, was also a first-class cricketer.
