= Deborah Evetts =

Bookbinder and book conservator

Deborah Evetts is a fine bookbinder and book conservator.

Evetts was born and trained in England. She attended the Brighton College of Art and the Central School of Arts and Crafts. She relocated to the United States in 1967, and became an American citizen in 1973.

She taught bookbinding classes for several years at St. Crispins’ Bindery in New York before becoming a book conservator at the Morgan Library in 1969, a position which she held for several decades. She is now an independent conservation consultant.

She is a member of the Guild of Book Workers, a fellow with the UK-based Designer Bookbinders group, and was a member of the Hroswitha Club before its dissolution. She has shown fine bindings in exhibitions throughout her career. Much of her work features colorful leather bindings with gilt lettering.
