= Trilby (play) =

Play by Paul M. Potter

Dorothea Baird in the title role of the London production of Trilby (1895)

Trilby is a stage play by Paul M. Potter based on the 1894 novel Trilby by George du Maurier. In the play, a young artist's model, Trilby, falls under the control of Svengali, who uses hypnosis to make her abandon her fiancé and become a singer.

The play debuted in Boston, Massachusetts in March 1895, where the role of Svengali was created by American actor Wilton Lackaye at the Park Theatre. It was a success in England as directed, produced by and starring Herbert Beerbohm Tree as Svengali, with Dorothea Baird in the title role, opening at the Haymarket Theatre in October 1895.

== Background ==
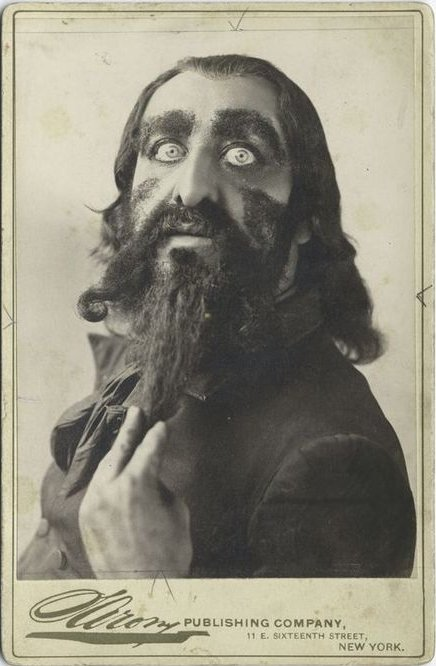
Wilton Lackaye as Svengali in the original American production (1895)

While touring the United States in the Spring of 1895 Tree heard of the success of an adaptation of du Maurier's novel by Paul M. Potter being performed by the company of theatrical manager Albert Marshall Palmer at the Boston Museum. He sent his half-brother and agent Max Beerbohm to see the play and report back on it. Max Beerbohm stated that the play was "absolute nonsense" and would be a failure in London. Tree dismissed the play from his mind until he had a night free and went to see the play in Buffalo, New York, with Wilton Lackaye in the role of Svengali and Virginia Harned playing the title role.

Tree immediately bought the British rights to the play and on his return to London mounted his own production, firstly at the Theatre Royal in Manchester on 7 September 1895 and finally on 30 October 1895 at the Haymarket Theatre in London. The two Manchester performances secured British copyright for Potter's adaptation. Tree's company then toured, performing Trilby at the Grand Theatre, Leeds 11–14 September; at the Theatre Royal, Glasgow 16 and 20 September; at the Royal Lyceum Theatre in Edinburgh 23–27 September; at the Royal Court Theatre in Liverpool 30 September-5 October; at the Gaiety Theatre in Dublin 7–12 October; at the Tyne Theatre in Newcastle 14–19 October; and at the Theatre Royal in Birmingham 21–26 October.

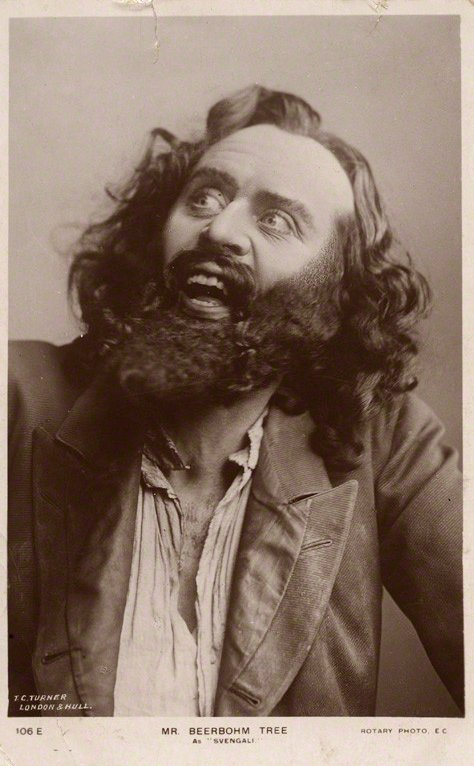
Herbert Beerbohm Tree as Svengali in the London production (1895)

The London premiere on 30 October 1895 was the company's first presentation at the Haymarket since returning from their American tour. Potter's original script was revised for Tree, who himself played Svengali, giving even more significance to the role of Svengali in the play than in the novel. For the lead role of Trilby O'Ferrall he chose the 20-year-old Dorothea Baird, who had made her London debut in 1894 as Hippolyta in A Midsummer Night's Dream. Tree directed the production. The musical director was Raymond Rôze, and the choreographer was John D'Auban. The play was a huge financial success, and from the profits Tree built Her Majesty's Theatre. Fifty years later Max Beerbohm persisted in his evaluation of the play, telling his biographer Samuel Behrman, "I was right about Trilby."

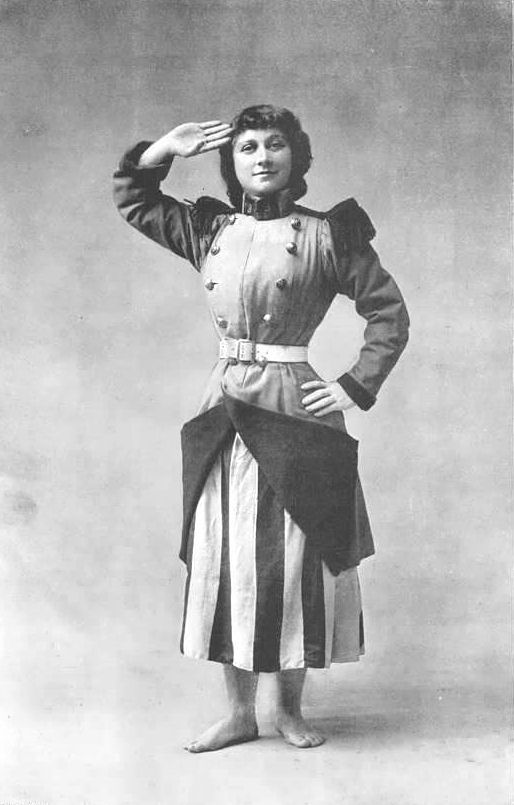
Kitty Loftus as Trilby at the Prince of Wales Theatre (1896)

The play was revived many times, including at the Apollo Theatre in the 1920s. It became so popular that it was travestied, including as A Model Trilby; or, A Day or Two After Du Maurier (1895) by Charles H. E. Brookfield and William Yardley, with music by Meyer Lutz, at the Opera Comique, produced by the retired Nellie Farren. In America it was parodied in 1895 as Thrillby, to a book by Joseph W. Herbert and a score by Frank Osmond Carr.

Tree filmed the play in 1914, which was released as Trilby; he was the only member of the original cast to appear. The 1915 American film Trilby starred Wilton Lackaye and Clara Kimball Young. An adaptation of the novel was broadcast as a BBC Play of the Month in the UK on 25 January 1976.

== Synopsis ==
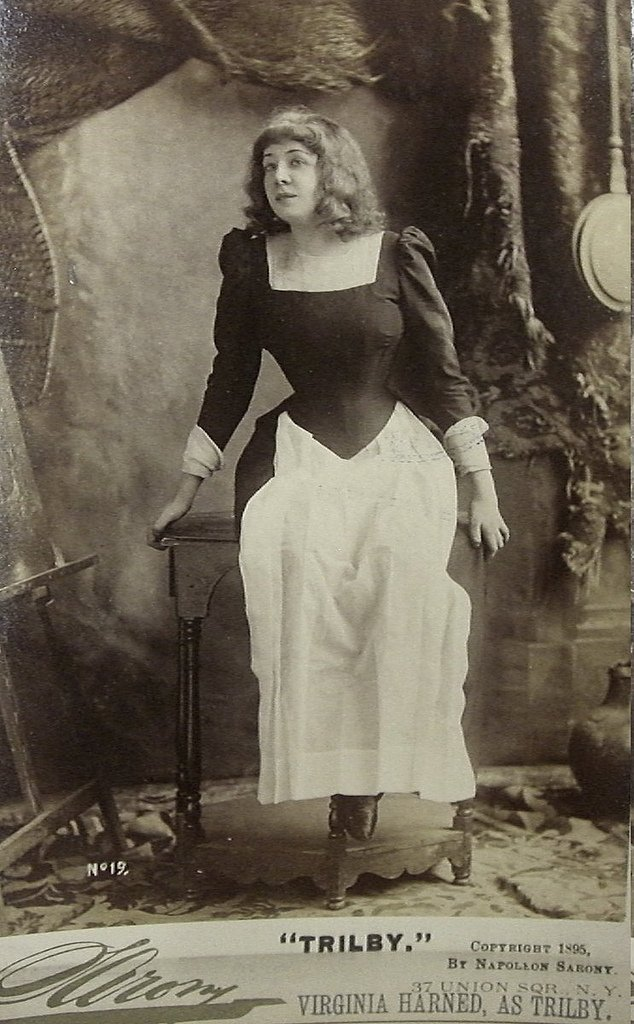
Virginia Harned as Trilby in the original American production (1895)

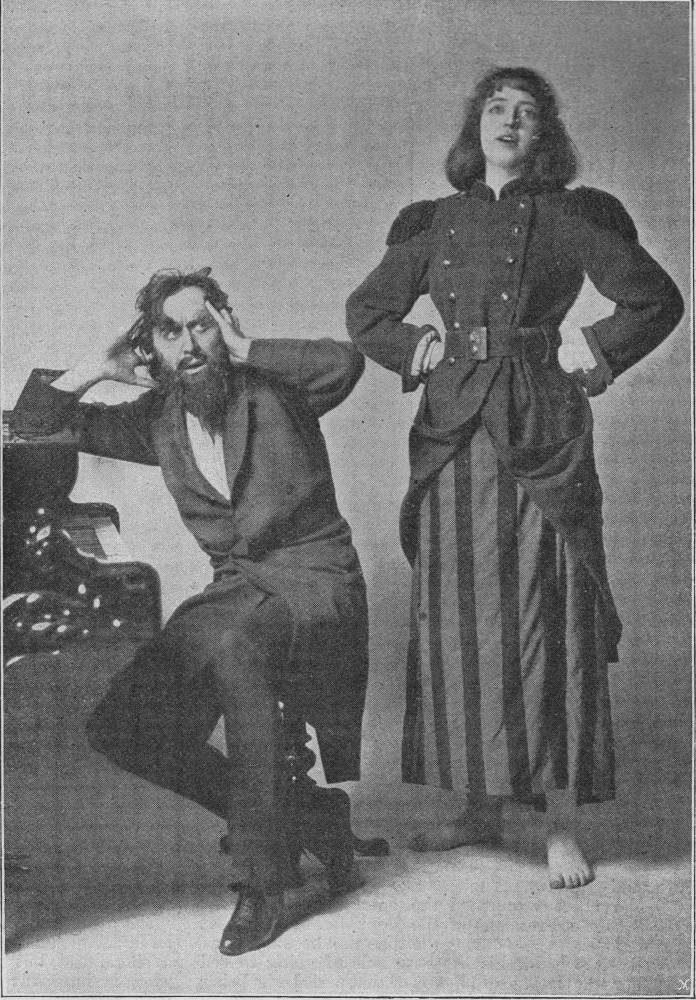
Dorothea Baird sings "Oh, don't you remember sweet Alice, Ben Bolt; Sweet Alice, with her hair so brown?" to Herbert Beerbohm Tree in a scene from the play

The action is set in Paris during the 1850s.

Act I

Three British art students share a studio in Paris. 'Taffy' Wynne and Sandy McAlister are attracted by the young artist's model Trilby O'Ferrall, but 'Little Billee' Bagot wants to marry her, even though he is upset by her posing nude. She refuses him because she thinks herself unworthy of him. Svengali, a neighbouring Jewish piano player, demonstrates his hypnotic powers over Trilby, curing her migraine. He claims he can train her voice, even though she is tone deaf.

The Act ends with Taffy persuading Trilby to accept Little Billee's proposal.

Act II

The night before the wedding Little Billee's mother arrives unannounced. Svengali tells her of the marriage and poisons her against Trilby. Mrs Bagot forbids the marriage, so Little Billee's friends suggest that instead he should elope with Trilby; however, when Svengali is alone with Trilby he hypnotizes her into writing a letter of farewell. When his friend Gecko protests at his actions Svengali suffers a heart attack from which he recovers and leaves with Trilby. When Billee and his friends return he discovers the letter and is heart broken.

Act III

Five years later the friends return to Paris and attend the Circus des Bashibazouks where they are horrified to discover 'Madame Svengali', the famous concert soprano is actually Trilby who they later discover is in a trance induced by Svengali. Taffy attacks Svengali as he follows Trilby to the concert platform, and Svengali has a heart attack and dies cursing. At his death Trilby's voice returns to its former tuneless state, and she is led into the foyer in a state of collapse.

Act IV

Trilby is returned to the old studio in an attempt to help her recover physically and mentally from her ordeal. She recalls nothing of her experiences with Svengali or her singing career and Billee proposes to her again. At Christmas time a parcel is delivered for Trilby, and on opening it she discovers it is a portrait of himself ordered by Svengali. As soon as she sees the portrait Trilby falls into a trance, sings a few notes of her favourite ballad and collapses and dies in the arms of Little Billee.

== Cast list ==
Role	Boston Museum 4 March 1895 and Garden Theatre, New York 15–20 April 1895	Theatre Royal, Manchester 7 September 1895 and Haymarket Theatre, London 30 October 1895
Svengali	Wilton Lackaye	Herbert Beerbohm Tree
Talbot "Taffy" Wynne	Burr McIntosh	Edmund Maurice
Alexander McAlister, “The Laird of Cockpen”	John Glendinning	Lionel Brough
William Bagot, “Little Billee”	Alfred Hickman	Patrick Evans
Gecko, second violin at the Gymnase	Robert Faton Gibbs	C.M. Hallard
Duc de la Rochemartel, “Zouzou”	Leo Ditrichstein	Herbert Ross
Theodore de la Farce, “Dodor	Alex L. Gisiko	Gerald du Maurier
Antony, art student	W.M. de Silke	Berte Thomas
Lorimer, art student	Edwin Brandt	Gayer Mackay
Rev. Thomas Bagot	Edward L. Walton	Charles Allan
Colonel Kaw, a theatrical manager	Reuben Fax	E. Holman Clark
Trilby O’Ferrall, an artist’s model	Virginia Harned	Dorothea Baird
Mrs. Bagot	Rosa Rand	Frances Ivor
Madame Vinard, a concierge	Mathilde Cottrelly	Rosina Filippi
Angèle, a grisette	Grace Pierrepont	Cicely Turner
Honorine, a grisette	Lucile Nelson	Agnes Russell
Musette, a grisette	Josephine Bennett	Sadie Wigley
Ernestine, a grisette		Sybil Erlyn
Mimi, dancer from the Salle Valentino	Menta Elmo	Olive Owen
La petite Noisette, dancer from the Salle Valentino		Winnie Leon
Hortense, dancer from the Salle Valentino		Madge Langton
Desirée, dancer from the Salle Valentino		Helen Graeme
