= Henry Irving =

English stage actor of the Victorian era (1838–1905)

Sir Henry Irving
- Irving c. 1878
- Born: John Henry Brodribb; 6 February 1838; Keinton Mandeville, Somerset, England
- Died: 13 October 1905 (aged 67); Bradford, Yorkshire, England
- Resting place: Westminster Abbey
- Occupation: Actor-manager
- Years active: 1856–1905
- Spouse: Florence O'Callaghan (m. 1869; sep. 1871)
- Children: H. B. Irving; Laurence Irving

Sir Henry Irving (né John Henry Brodribb; 6 February 1838 – 13 October 1905) was an English actor-manager in the Victorian and Edwardian eras. He established himself at the West End theatre the Lyceum. His long campaign to have theatre recognised as an art of equal importance with music and painting culminated when he was knighted in 1895, the first actor to be thus honoured.

Irving was born in the West Country of England and grew up in straitened circumstances. He was raised by his mother and her sister, who were intensely religious and disapproved of his passion for the theatre. He secured an engagement with a repertory company in Sunderland in 1856 and learned his craft in a succession of provincial theatres, and occasionally in London, over the next fourteen years. In 1870 he established himself as a West End actor with a leading role in a long-running play at the Vaudeville Theatre. The impresario H. L. Bateman, proprietor of the Lyceum, then recruited him, and Irving soon made a sensational impression in The Bells which propelled him into the front rank of English actors. After Bateman died in 1875, his widow took over the company, which she handed over to Irving in 1878.

With Ellen Terry as his leading lady, over the next twenty-three years Irving made the Lyceum the most important theatre in London. He became particularly associated with the plays of Shakespeare, although most of his productions were of modern works. He engaged leading designers and composers and became known for the lavishness of his productions, which he presented not only at the Lyceum but on tour in Britain and North America. Despite mannerisms in speech and sometimes ungainly movement, he was known as an intense, magnetic actor who could hold an audience spellbound. He appeared in roles that displayed nobility and goodness, and others that were malign and evil.

Overwork and financial difficulties undermined Irving's health and led to his leaving the Lyceum in 1902. In his last years his London base was the Theatre Royal, Drury Lane, and he continued to tour the provinces, dying suddenly after a performance in Bradford in October 1905. His ashes were buried in Westminster Abbey.

== Biography ==
=== Early years ===
Irving's birthplace, Keinton Mandeville, Somerset

Henry Irving was born as John Henry Brodribb in a modest house subsequently named Irving House in Keinton Mandeville in Somerset in the west of England on 6 February 1838. He was the only child of Samuel Brodribb, a not very prosperous retailer, and his wife, Mary née Behenna. When their son was four years old the Brodribbs' finances had become so poor as to split up the family: the parents moved to Bristol in pursuit of a better income, but his mother insisted that the boy should be brought up in the countryside. He was sent to live in the village of Halsetown, near St Ives in Cornwall, with her sister, Sarah. She and her husband, Isaac Penberthy, a Cornish miner, had three children of their own, with whom the young Brodribb got on well. The household was austerely Methodist but Mrs Penberthy, though stern, was affectionate, and her husband mercurial but good-hearted. He died suddenly in 1849 leaving his widow short of the means to keep Brodribb. The boy, now aged eleven, rejoined his parents, who had moved to London.

Samuel Phelps as Hamlet: an inspiration for the young Irving

The boy had developed a stammer, which precluded the career as a Methodist minister that his mother wished for him; his father envisaged a business career, and sent his son to the City Commercial School in Lombard Street. The headmaster of the school, Dr Pinches, placed great emphasis on legible writing, correct grammar, spelling and – to the young Brodribb's pleasure and benefit – good diction: elocution classes were part of the curriculum and the boy slowly mastered his speech impediment.

Pinches encouraged Brodribb senior to take the boy to the theatre; Mrs Brodribb, who disapproved of theatres, reluctantly agreed, provided a respectable play was chosen. Father and son saw Samuel Phelps as Hamlet at Sadler's Wells Theatre. Phelps was regarded as the finest Hamlet of his generation, and the young Brodribb was captivated. In the words of his grandson and biographer, Laurence Irving:

Spellbound, the boy watched the much-read story unfold before him. He hung upon the lovely words so clearly spoken, now moved to tears by the gentle pathos of which Phelps was a master, now joining in the uproarious laughter which greeted the actor's broad interpretation of Hamlet's antic disposition, his rallying of Polonius, and his comical exchanges with the gravediggers.

=== Début ===
The young Brodribb's schooling ended when he was thirteen. He became a clerk, first in a solicitor's office and then with merchants in the City of London. He hankered after a theatrical career, and among his friends was the actor William Hoskins, a member of Phelps's company, who gave him some tuition in acting and introduced him to Phelps. Learning of the young man's burning ambition, Phelps warned him that acting was "an ill-requited profession", but finding him determined on a stage career he said, "In that case, Sir, you'd better come here and I'll give you two pounds a week to begin with". Brodribb did not take up Phelps's offer: the biographers Laurence Irving (1951) and Michael Holroyd (2008) offer two possible reasons for this. First, he "knew that London was a prize to be won, that his assault upon the capital was not to be attempted until he had perfected himself in the hard school of the provincial stock company", and secondly, that his becoming an actor would so distress his mother that he needed to be away from London and his parents.

Before leaving London, he submitted himself to a final test. At that time it was not uncommon for aspiring actors to have themselves cast in amateur – and sometimes professional – productions upon payment of a fee to the company. In August 1856, helped by a gift of £100 from an uncle, the eighteen-year-old Brodribb bought the role of Romeo in an amateur production of Romeo and Juliet at the Soho Theatre in the West End of London. Either to save his mother the embarrassment of having the family name associated with theatres or because he thought his real name unsuitable for an aspiring actor, he adopted the stage name Henry Irving, which he retained throughout his life and eventually formally took by royal licence. (Note: The full name he officially adopted, in 1889, was John Henry Brodribb Irving. Changes of name by royal licence were commonly undertaken in the 19th century, before generally being superseded by deed poll in the 20th.) His performance was well received, and he was confirmed in his determination to become a professional actor.

Playbill for Irving's professional début

Hoskins had extensive contacts in the British theatre, and helped Irving secure an engagement with the actor-manager E. D. Davis, who hired him for his repertory company at the Lyceum Theatre, Sunderland. His début role, in September 1856, was Gaston, Duke of Orleans, in a revival of Edward Bulwer-Lytton's Richelieu. Shortly afterwards, the inexperienced Irving, either from stage fright or a recurrence of his speech impediment, could not deliver his lines and was hissed off the stage, but Davis, the actor Samuel Johnson and their colleagues supported him with practical advice. Later in life, Irving gave them regular work when he formed his own company in London.

=== Learning his craft ===
Irving remained with Davis's company in Sunderland until February 1857 and then moved to the Queen's Theatre in Edinburgh, where he stayed for two and a half years. In the two locations he appeared in nearly 400 plays. Most are now forgotten, but among them were several Shakespeare productions: Irving's roles included Orlando in As You Like It, Claudius in Hamlet, Banquo in Macbeth, Bassanio in The Merchant of Venice, Richmond in Richard III, Tybalt in Romeo and Juliet and Petruchio in The Taming of the Shrew. He played Captain Absolute in The Rivals and the title roles in dramatisations of David Copperfield and Nicholas Nickleby as well as appearing in pantomimes and extravaganzas.

In September 1859 Irving made his professional debut in London, in the first of four consecutive productions at the Princess's Theatre, after which he gave two well-received dramatic readings of scenes from Bulwer-Lytton's The Lady of Lyons at Crosby Hall. The theatrical newspaper, The Era commented:

Mr Irving possesses two important requisites for the task of a reader – good taste and earnestness. These, with a flexible and easily modulated voice, give him advantages of no ordinary importance as a public speaker … Mr Irving is likely to take high ground as a chaste and elegant reader. The different characters of the play were discriminated with great judgment, and the several parts brought out with a breadth and vigour that reflects credit on his penetration.

Irving as Hamlet, 1864

His biographer Robertson Davies writes that Irving's theatrical apprenticeship was long and demanding. Between 1860 and 1870 he played hundreds of parts in stock companies in Dublin, Birmingham, Liverpool, Oxford, the Isle of Man and Manchester, where he played his first Hamlet, a part he went on to play more than two hundred times in the provinces, London and the US. The Dublin engagement was particularly challenging: he was replacing a popular favourite who had been dismissed, and he was shouted down at every performance until he eventually overcame the hostility of the audience. He made some appearances on the London stage during these years, gaining good notices without achieving any great fame. In 1866 Ruth Herbert engaged him as a leading actor and sometime stage manager (Note: At that time the term denoted the person directing all aspects of a theatrical production rather than, as in modern usage, the person responsible only for coordinating the production as well as the lighting, sound, and other technical arrangements.) at the St James's Theatre. He directed W. S. Gilbert's first successful solo play, Dulcamara, or the Little Duck and the Great Quack, an afterpiece to Dion Boucicault's drama Hunted Down, in which Irving played the villain. His other roles for the St James's company included Joseph Surface in The School for Scandal, Jack Absolute in The Rivals and Young Marlow in She Stoops to Conquer.

In 1867, after a month playing in Our American Cousin in Paris alongside his friend Edward Saker, Irving appeared at the Queen's Theatre in Catherine and Petruchio, David Garrick's much abbreviated version of The Taming of the Shrew, as Petruchio to the Catherine of Ellen Terry; The Times thought much more highly of her performance than of his. According to Davies, neither Irving nor Terry was greatly impressed with the other's performance in this, their first joint appearance. The Queen's company included Charles Wyndham, J. L. Toole, Lionel Brough, John Clayton, Mr and Mrs Alfred Wigan and Nellie Farren. Irving's roles included Young Marlow, Bill Sykes in Oliver Twist, Charles Surface in The School for Scandal and Faulkland in The Rivals. From April to June 1869 he joined his lifelong friend Toole in the West End and on tour in a repertory consisting mainly of comic plays.

=== Success ===
Irving finally made his West End breakthrough as Digby Grant in James Albery's Two Roses, which was produced at the Vaudeville Theatre on 4 June 1870 and ran for 294 performances. This solid success secured Irving's place as a leading London actor. In September 1871 he was engaged by the impresario H. L. Bateman as leading man at the Lyceum. An adaptation by Albery of The Pickwick Papers received poor notices for the play but laudatory reviews of Irving's performance as Alfred Jingle. One critic wrote, "No more satisfactory representative of Jingle could be found, and if anything can save the comedy (which I very much doubt), it will be Mr. Irving's thoroughly excellent performance".

As the haunted murderer Mathias in The Bells, 1872

The production did not attract the public. It was Bateman's second successive failure, and his finances were in some difficulty. Irving persuaded him to mount an adaptation of a play he had found, Erckmann-Chatrian's Le Juif polonais in an English version by Leopold Lewis titled The Bells. In the original French version, Constant Coquelin had played the central role of Mathias as an outright villain, whereas, according to the playwright Henry Arthur Jones, reported by Holroyd, "Irving was any one of us, an innocent man who, of a sudden, gives in to temptation". In Holroyd's words, "What Irving achieved ... was to raise a mediocre historical drama to the status of a dramatic masterpiece":

The power of his performance held audiences in agonised suspense, and he became the talk of London. The Bells played to crowded houses for 150 performances and would gain increasing fame over the next thirty-five years as part of Irving's repertoire. His extraordinary achievement came from having grafted on to the role of the innkeeper-burgomaster something from within himself – something too that found an echo in the Victorian conscience. He had saved Bateman's fortunes and would soon be seen as a saviour of the British theatre.

For Bateman, Irving appeared in six further productions at the Lyceum, ending with Hamlet, which played for more than two hundred nights, an unprecedented run for a Shakespeare play. On the day after the hundredth performance Bateman died of a heart attack, and his widow took over the management of the theatre. For her, Irving played in ten productions between September 1875 and July 1878, including Macbeth and Othello, in which his performances in the title roles were not highly praised, and Richard III, described as "magnificent". In the last of these he restored Shakespeare's original text – for many years the play had usually been given with a text rewritten by Colly Cibber. By this time Irving was clearly the star attraction at the Lyceum, and it was increasingly anomalous that he remained a salaried member of Mrs. Bateman's company. She handed over the theatre and its management to him on 31 August 1878, and, as Davies puts it, "His great reign of twenty-three years in the theatre which he made world famous began".

=== Actor-manager ===
After taking over the theatre from Mrs. Bateman, Irving went on a highly successful provincial tour while the Lyceum was being refurbished. He reopened there on 30 December 1878 with a new leading lady, Ellen Terry, playing Ophelia to his Hamlet. The Times later commented, "Not the least of his triumphs was the making of a tragic actress out of a born comedian". The production was enthusiastically received; one reviewer wrote, "The representation of Hamlet supplied on Monday night is the best the stage during the last quarter of a century has seen, and it is the best also that is likely, under existing conditions, to be seen for some time to come". According to Michael R. Booth in The Oxford Encyclopedia of Theatre and Performance (2005), "Irving's Hamlet ... noble and injured, was a revelation: rejecting all tradition and conventional 'points', and combining psychological insights with modern domesticity, it was a new, contemporary Hamlet, one of the finest Victorian stage performances".

As Shylock, 1879

By this time Irving had gained two loyal lieutenants in Henry J. Loveday as stage manager and Bram Stoker as business manager. (Note: Stoker is remembered as the author of the novel Dracula, and some later writers have suggested that elements of the character are based on the character or physical appearance of Irving, or his performances as Mephistopheles in Faust or as Shylock, although in his two-volume memoir of Irving, Stoker makes no mention of this idea. Holroyd quotes the view of the cultural historian Jeffrey Richards that "we can see Irving’s unmistakable features" in another character he did not play at the Lyceum: Sherlock Holmes. To Stoker's disappointment, Irving rejected the part of Dracula when the 1897 novel was dramatised.) Together with Terry they made a team associated with Irving for the rest of his life. He directed the Lyceum's productions, controlling and supervising all aspects of the theatre's operations: employment of actors, wages, music, repertory, rehearsals, and stage lighting. In Booth's view, "The stage lighting system was his personal creation, and his productions were pictorially beautiful in the best Victorian tradition".

The Lyceum staged popular melodrama, farce and comedy as well as classic plays. Among the new pieces that Irving presented at the theatre were two comedies written by an actor in his company, Arthur Wing Pinero. In November 1879 Irving was an "old, haggard, halting and sordid" Shylock to the Portia of Terry in The Merchant of Venice, a production that ran for seven months. During the run Irving incurred the opprobrium of F. J. Furnivall of the Shakespeare Society by cutting the final act (in which Shylock does not appear) to make way for an afterpiece, a version of King René's Daughter, adapted by W. G. Wills as Iolanthe, a vehicle for Terry in the title role. (Note: In 1882 W. S. Gilbert and Arthur Sullivan were preparing their latest comic opera, Iolanthe, and in view of the Lyceum's use of the title two years earlier Gilbert felt it necessary to obtain Irving's permission to use it.) He and Edwin Booth alternated as Othello and Iago; his Romeo to Terry's Juliet was one of his less successful roles. In October 1882 he and Terry played Benedick and Beatrice in Much Ado About Nothing. The critic Dutton Cook reported that Irving was "a valorous cavalier who rejoices in brave apparel and owns a strong feeling for humour; over his witty encounters with Beatrice there presides a spirit of pleasantness; his rudest sallies are so mirthfully spoken as to be deprived of all real offensiveness; he banters like a gentleman and not like a churl; he is a privileged railer at women, a recognised jester at marriage, but a popular person nevertheless". The play ran for eight months.

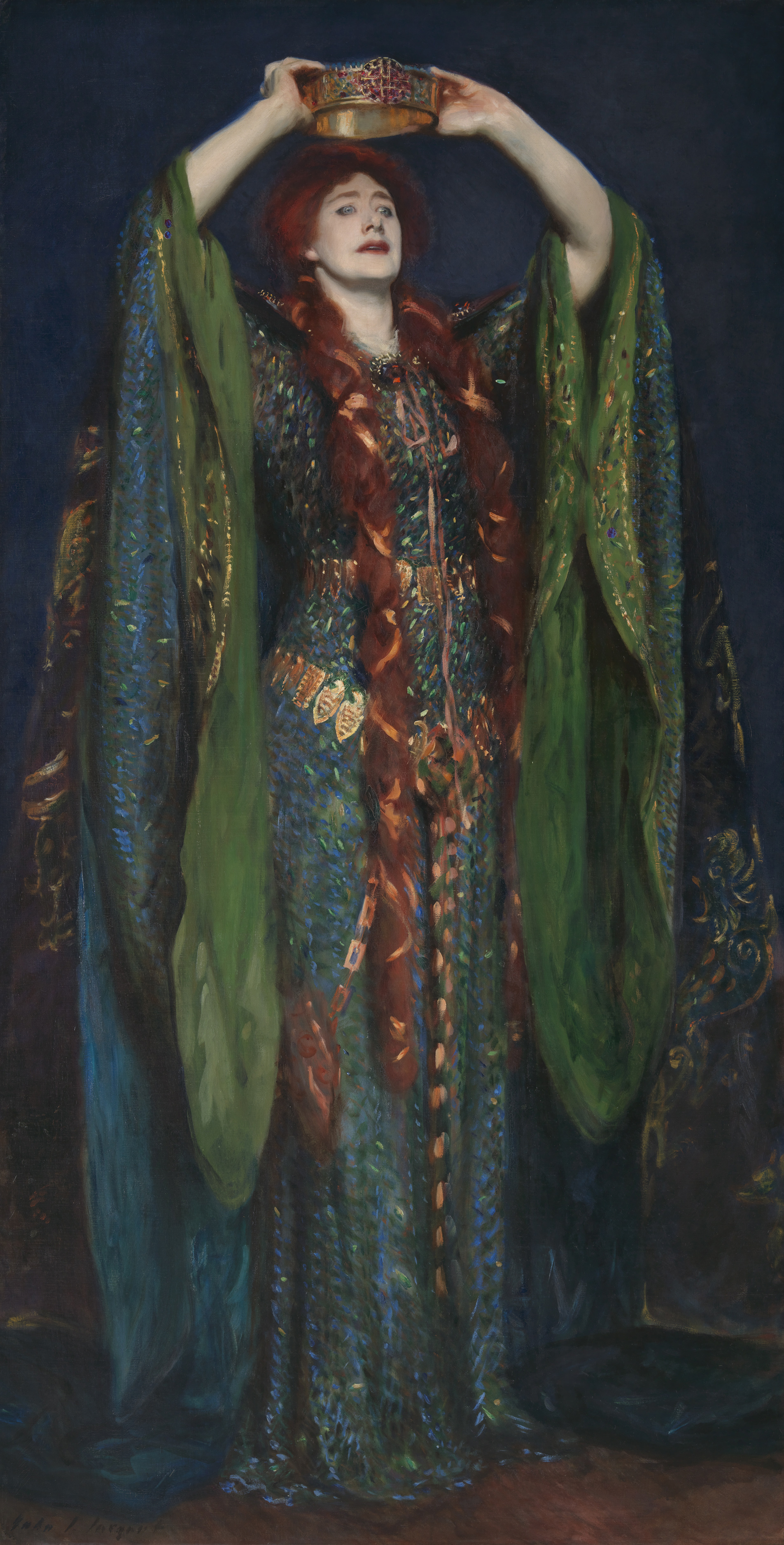
Ellen Terry as Lady Macbeth

In 1883 Irving set out on the first of his eight North American tours. He and the Lyceum company played a repertory of eight plays. His Broadway début was at the Star Theater on 29 October, when he played Mathias in The Bells. The other plays in the tour included The Merchant of Venice, Hamlet and Much Ado About Nothing. Irving and his company were much acclaimed; The Daily Telegraph's New York correspondent reported, "Mr Irving's success has been overwhelming ... the most remarkable and perfect acting ever seen upon the American stage".

Twelfth Night followed at the Lyceum in 1884, succeeded by adaptations by Wills of Goldsmith's The Vicar of Wakefield and Goethe's Faust (both 1885). The last of these ran for 388 performances and was Irving's greatest box-office success at the Lyceum. In 1888 Irving returned to the role of Macbeth. His attempt on the part in 1875 had not been among his better-received performances, and for his second production of the play he gave the two central roles greater prominence by cutting some twenty per cent of Shakespeare's text, removing several entire scenes in which Macbeth or Lady Macbeth (Terry) did not appear. He split the fifth, final act into two, believing that this would prolong tension. New incidental music was written by Arthur Sullivan, the scenery was by Hawes Craven and Joseph Harker, and Alice Comyns Carr designed the costume for Terry's Lady Macbeth in which John Singer Sargent painted her (pictured). The production and Irving's performance were well received by the press and public.

After a disastrous fire at the Theatre Royal, Exeter in 1887 killed 186 people, Irving strove for better safety in theatres. Working with the architect Alfred Darbyshire he developed the "Irving Safety Theatre" principles, including a safety curtain between stage and auditorium. (Note: These principles included making the theatre site isolated, dividing the auditorium from the back of the house, a minimum height above street level for any part of the audience, providing two separate exits for every section of the audience, improving stage construction including a smoke flue, and fire-resistant construction throughout.)

The last Lyceum production of the 1880s was The Dead Heart, by Watts Phillips (1889). During the decade Irving had established his theatre's reputation: then and later he commissioned incidental music from leading British composers including Sullivan, Julius Benedict, Alexander Mackenzie, C. V. Stanford and Edward German, and designs by artists including Lawrence Alma Tadema, Edward Burne-Jones, John Tenniel and Ford Madox Brown. The critic William Archer wrote, "It is scarcely too much to say that the Lyceum is as prominent an element in the social life of London as the Théâtre-Français in that of Paris".

=== 1890s ===
Irving in 1892

At the Lyceum in January 1892 Irving mounted a production of Henry VIII in which he played Cardinal Wolsey to the King of William Terriss, the Queen Catherine of Terry and the Anne Boleyn of Violet Vanbrugh. The Times commented:

It is chiefly as a spectacle that the Lyceum production impresses us … a lavish display in the matter of costume and scenic appointments. What tale the tradesmen's bills may tell it is impossible to say, but the impression left by the mounting of this play is that it is the costliest of Mr Irving's many enterprises. The Tudor Court seems to live again in all its sumptuousness and splendour.

The reviewer was correct about the cost of the production, and although it ran for six months the box-office receipts fell far short of covering the outlay.

In November 1892 Irving played King Lear, and in the following February he made a great success of Tennyson's Becket, alongside Terry and Terriss. He presented a command performance of the play at Windsor Castle in March before sailing for another American tour. On 8 November 1893 his company presented Becket at the opening of Abbey's Theatre on Broadway. The New-York Tribune reported, "It was very brilliantly played; and every appreciative spectator of it must have been pleasurably excited, exalted and deeply impressed. The manifestations of public delight were numerous and emphatic".

In the title role of Becket, 1893

Back in England, in September 1894 the Lyceum company premiered Arthur Conan Doyle's The Story of Waterloo in Bristol. Irving played Corporal Gregory Brewster. In January the following year, Terry played Guinevere to Johnston Forbes Robertson's Lancelot and Irving took the title part in a production of King Arthur, written by J. Comyns Carr, with incidental music by Arthur Sullivan, and designed by Burne-Jones.

In the 1895 Birthday Honours Irving was knighted for services to art – the first actor to be so honoured. Davies describes this as the pinnacle of Irving's career, when his long campaign to have the theatre recognised as an art on a par with music and painting was crowned by the accolade. W. E. Gladstone as prime minister had first considered him for the knighthood as early as 1883, but did not pursue it because he thought Irving's rumoured liaison with Ellen Terry might provoke objections from Queen Victoria. (Note: According to an old friend of Irving, he would not have accepted the honour if offered it at that time.) The heir to the throne, the Prince of Wales, was a strong supporter of Irving's knighthood, which was bestowed at Windsor on 18 July. Gladstone had been wrong about the Queen's potential opposition: as she touched Irving's shoulder with the sword she told him, "I am very, very pleased".

On another US visit in 1895 Irving played Don Quixote and Macbeth. The New York Times objected to his vocal mannerisms but found his performance in the latter "substantially the Macbeth of tradition richly elaborated ... an interesting interpretation, for the complete, beautiful, rich and careful manner in which the tragedy is presented". After returning to London, Irving staged one of the less popular Shakespeare plays, Cymbeline, in mid-1896; he played Iachimo. In December of that year he injured his knee and was off the stage for two months. This cost him a considerable amount at the box office, but he made a profitable provincial tour the following year.

According to the critic and theatre historian Sheridan Morley, Irving had one of his most expensive failures in January 1898 when he played the title role in Peter the Great, a play by his son, Laurence. Terry was in the cast, but her role was peripheral; the piece was not well liked and closed within a month. The following month Irving's scenery warehouse caught fire: more than £30,000 worth of property was destroyed. (Note: According to calculations based on the Consumer Price Index measure of inflation, £30,000 in 1898 is approximately £3,370,000 in 2025.) It was impossible to replicate quickly, and his repertoire at the Lyceum was severely limited. In May he had another failure with The Medicine Man by Robert Hitchens and Henry Duff Traill, billed as a "melodramatic comedy". It had the novelty of being the first Lyceum production in modern dress, but it failed to convince reviewers and the public. Later in the year Irving made another financially rewarding provincial tour, but then he contracted pneumonia and pleurisy and was unable to appear for months. In the hope of sorting out his finances he gave up sole ownership of the Lyceum and turned it into a limited company in April 1899.

=== Last years ===
As Coriolanus, 1901

In 1901 Irving presented another Shakespeare play of limited box-office potential: Coriolanus. It lost money, but he recouped some in a twenty-nine week American tour. According to Booth, "Years of overwork and financial difficulties combined to push Irving out of the Lyceum in 1902". In July of that year Terry again played Portia to Irving's Shylock, but this was his last production at the Lyceum. The London County Council in a drive to enforce safety regulations in West End theatres stipulated that considerable structural work must be carried out if the building was to continue as a theatre. Neither Irving nor the company could afford to do it, and the Lyceum closed, was sold, and after rebuilding became a music hall.

That autumn Irving went on another provincial tour and gave a command performance of The Story of Waterloo at Sandringham for King Edward VII. In April 1903 Dante, written for Irving by Victorien Sardou, opened at the Theatre Royal, Drury Lane but was not a success. The Times observed that it "did neither author nor actor any credit", and the piece closed after eighty-one performances, failing to recoup the production costs. Irving played it on tour and in the US but it was no more successful there. His last appearance on an American stage was on 25 March 1904 at the Harlem Opera House.

In September 1904 Irving began a long and arduous provincial tour, which he intended to be his last. Morley writes, "It was triumphant and he was feted wherever he went", but the tour had to be cut short when Irving collapsed and was off the stage for two months. He returned to London and from 29 April to 10 June 1905 he played a repertory season at Drury Lane, opening in his old role of Becket. The drama critic of The Globe wrote, "From the moment when Sir Henry Irving came on the stage his triumph was assured. Such a shout of approval as rang through the house has seldom been heard in a theatre ... there was not a scene in which Becket appeared that did not bring down shouts of acclamation". Irving resumed his tour of the provinces. At Bradford on 3 October 1905, after a performance of Becket, he collapsed and died at his hotel, aged 67. His ashes were buried in Poets' Corner in Westminster Abbey on 20 October. (Note: Irving's ashes were the first to be interred in the Abbey. They are buried next to the grave of David Garrick; the ashes of Laurence Olivier were buried next to Irving's in 1989.)

== Personal life ==
In the 1860s Irving fell in love with Nellie Moore, a rising young actress, but she died in January 1869. He is said to have carried a photograph of her in his wallet for the rest of his life. (Note: According to research published by the Irving Society, the sitter in the photograph was in fact Zaré Thalberg.) He became acquainted with Florence O'Callaghan, who, as the daughter of a surgeon-general in the Indian Army, was considerably the social superior of even a successful actor. She was determined to marry Irving, and did so on 15 July 1869 at St Marylebone Parish Church. They had two children: the elder, Harry Brodribb Irving, usually known as "H. B. Irving", became a well-known actor and later a theatre manager. The younger, Laurence Irving, became a playwright. According to Davies, "From the beginning the marriage was stormy, for Florence could not forget the social gulf between them". Holroyd comments that Irving's focus on his work may have strained his wife's patience. On their way home after the opening night of The Bells in November 1871, Florence, who was pregnant with their second child, criticised his profession: "Are you going on making a fool of yourself like this all your life?" Irving halted their carriage at Hyde Park Corner, walked away, and never saw her again. He went to his friends the Batemans, and during the subsequent months they stood by him; Mrs Bateman in particular restrained the heavy drinking to which he resorted. He obtained a judicial separation from his wife and made her a generous allowance.

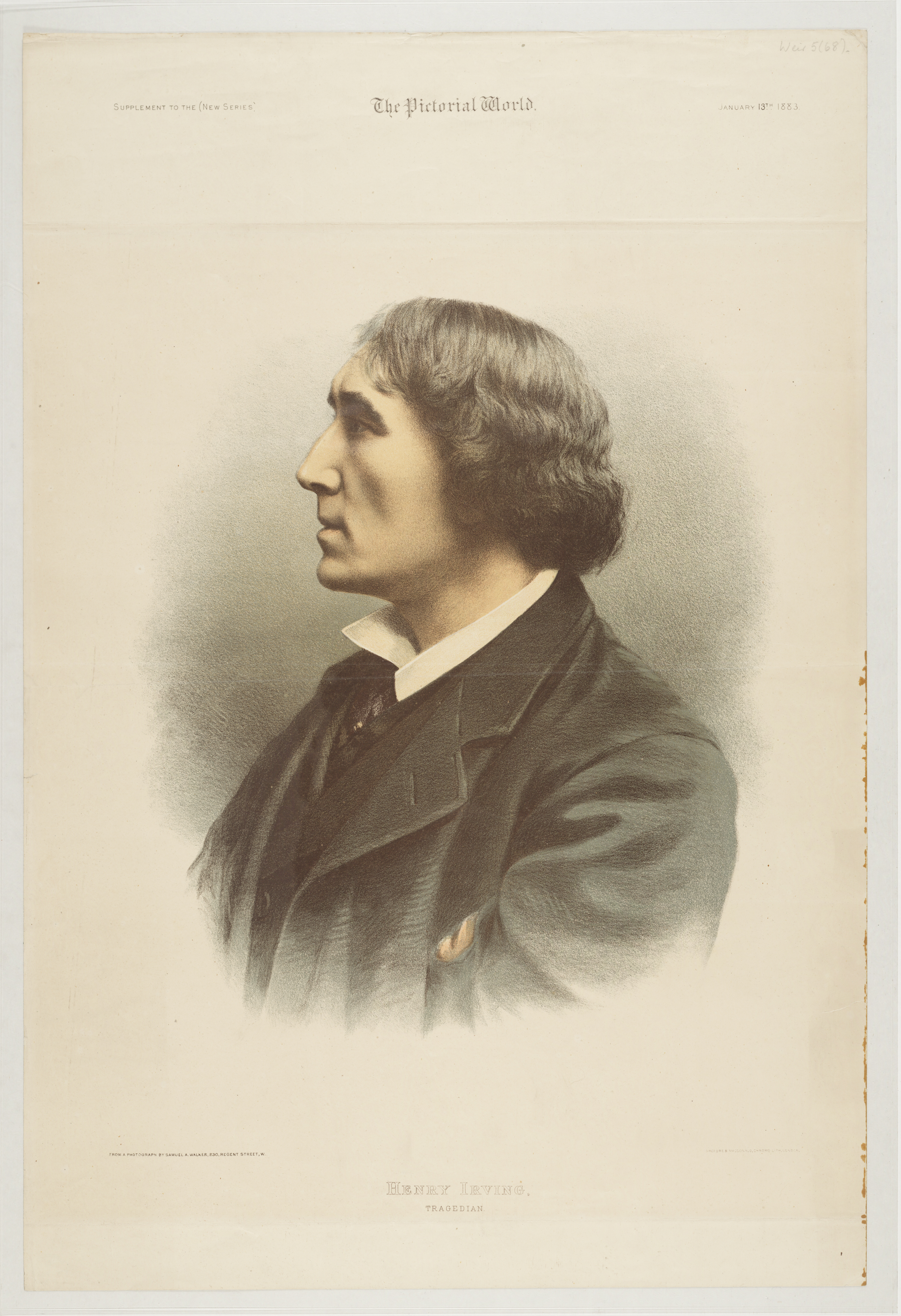
Irving in 1883

Matters were complicated by the fact that the Batemans' actress daughter Isabel was deeply in – unreciprocated – love with Irving, her leading man at the Lyceum, which made their professional relationship more difficult. After Irving took over the theatre from Mrs Bateman his leading lady was Ellen Terry, with whom he appeared over the following twenty-five years. Davies describes her as "unquestionably the most charming, if not always the most artistically effective, actress of her time ... an admirable foil for the darkling, sardonic Irving". It is unclear if their off-stage relationship was a romantic one, although Irving's estranged wife believed so and attempted to turn her two sons against him. Holroyd records that after Irving's death a friend, Marguerite Steen, asked Terry if she had been his lover, to which she replied, "Of course I was. We were terribly in love for a while", although at other times she denied it. Terry's biographer Roger Manvell concludes that if they did not consummate the relationship, they engaged in "minor physical intimacies".

After Terry, Irving was attracted to an actress in his company, Winifred Emery, but she did not reciprocate his interest, and married the actor Cyril Maude in 1888. Irving and his wife never divorced, and she insisted on being called Lady Irving after he was knighted.

Irving was a freemason and was a member of several London clubs, including the Garrick, the Athenaeum and the Reform. In 1878 he restored the dining room of the defunct Beefsteak Club, which was part of the backstage area of the Lyceum. There, he entertained royalty, colleagues, distinguished visitors to Britain and rising young writers and performers.

Politically, Irving inclined to Liberalism, and was on cordial terms with W. E. Gladstone. He did not engage in party politics, however, except where they impinged on the theatre, such as an attempt to impose a tax on theatre tickets, which he opposed strongly, contending that the public derived great benefit "from well conducted theatres – many of which in civilised countries are heavily subsidised by the State".

== Honours and appointments ==
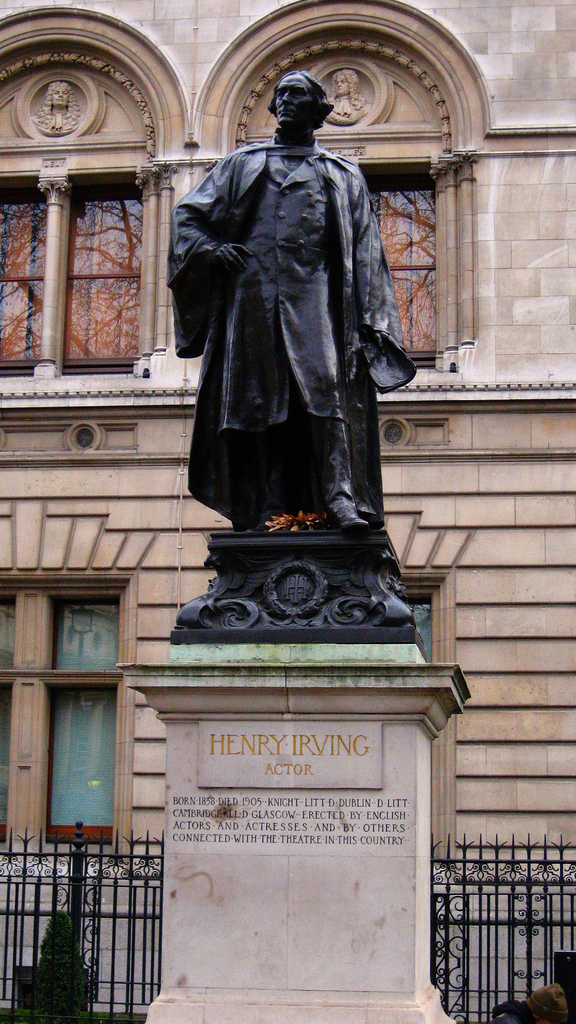
Larger than life size statue of Irving in Westminster

Irving was the first actor to be knighted, and he was awarded honorary degrees by the universities of Dublin, Cambridge and Glasgow. He was President of the Actors' Benevolent Fund, the Actors' Association and the Managers' Association of Great Britain. He gave lectures at Edinburgh, Harvard and Oxford universities.

After his death, tributes were paid by the US government, the theatres of Berlin and the Comédie française. A bronze statue by Thomas Brock, commissioned by the Irving Memorial Committee, stands outside what is now the main entrance of the National Portrait Gallery in Westminster. It was unveiled in December 1910 by the president of the committee, the actor Sir John Hare. The inscription states that the statue was "Erected by English Actors and Actresses and by others connected with the theatre in this country". It represents Irving in the robes of a doctor of letters, with one hand on his hip and the other holding a roll of manuscript. Irving is also commemorated by a number of plaques, including two on the house in Somerset where he was born, two on homes at which he lived in London, one at the scene of his death, and a tablet at Poets' Corner in Westminster Abbey.

== Reputation ==
In an essay published fifty years after Irving's death, E. J. West of the University of Colorado commented, "It is surprising how large Henry Irving's name bulks in the discussion of the playing of Shakespeare and how large in treatments of him bulks the discussion of his Shakespearian roles". West noted that of the more than six hundred parts Irving played during nearly half a century on stage, only forty-one were in Shakespeare, and twenty-eight of those were supporting roles played during his provincial days. In London he was seen in only thirteen Shakespearian roles. His characterisations in Shakespeare were innovative and sometimes controversial. Some provoked hostile criticism from critics including Bernard Shaw, William Archer, A. B. Walkley, Henry James and Max Beerbohm. Other critics, including C. E. Montague and James Agate, considered Irving a genius. Booth describes him as "an intense, magnetic, haunted actor who could almost hypnotize an audience. He was equally powerful at playing nobility and goodness on the one hand, and malignity and evil on the other." Irving's acting style, editing of the Shakespeare texts, appearance and productions at the Lyceum have been both satirised and praised for more than a century.

Shaw's view in later years was that Irving had been the greatest actor he ever saw. But during Irving's lifetime Shaw complained that the actor always played himself, although he admitted that in some roles Irving was more interesting than the original characters. Fellow actors, including Terry, took issue with some of his portrayals: Terry found his Malvolio "fine and dignified, but not good for the play" and thought his Othello "screamed and ranted and raved … It was painful to me", although she was full of praise for his Iago in the same play.

Throughout his career Irving was criticised by some for his diction. His voice was not naturally powerful and in sonorous rhetorical passages it sometimes failed him, but Shaw praised the purity of his speech and especially the firmness of his vowels. Some found his pronunciation unacceptable: West records that he pronounced "god" as "gad", "ghost" as rhyming with "lost", and sounded the 'e' in "caviare". Irving was also known for emphasising unexpected words: the playwright and critic Tom Taylor accused him of "heartless vivisection of lines and sentences, cutting off verbs from their nouns, substantives from their adjectives, antecedents from their relatives, and prepositions from the words they govern". Some objected to the grotesquerie of Irving's gestures, and even to his thin legs.

The Times said of him:

A great actor he was, but his greatness sprang from a different source than that of any other actor that can be mentioned. The success of his famous predecessors lay in their power to affect the emotions of their audience through the strength of their own emotions. They watched for opportunities of emotion, and tore the heartstrings of their hearers, without much regard for the cohesion or the general humanity of the characters they represented. Irving was not an emotional actor, or one who touched the emotions. His greatness lay in his brain, not in his feelings ... His first care was to read the part and the play, to find out what the author intended, and to build up for himself a conception (and it must be admitted that he preferred a totally new conception, wherever possible) of the character he was to represent. … The novelty of idea was an unfailing source of interest, and another was his magnetic personality. His tall figure, his beautiful, intense, ascetic face, threw a spell over his audience – a spell not so much of sympathy as of interest.

== Gallery ==
As Hamlet, 1874

As Macbeth, 1875

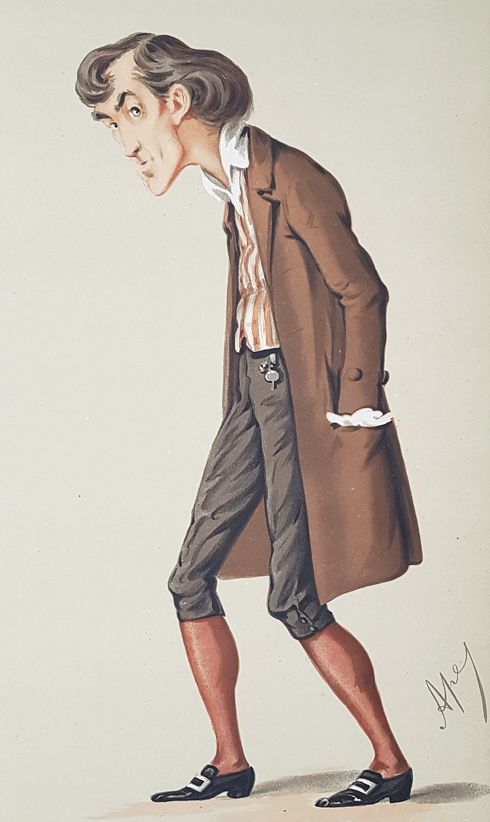
In The Bells – caricature by "Ape"

As Mephistopheles

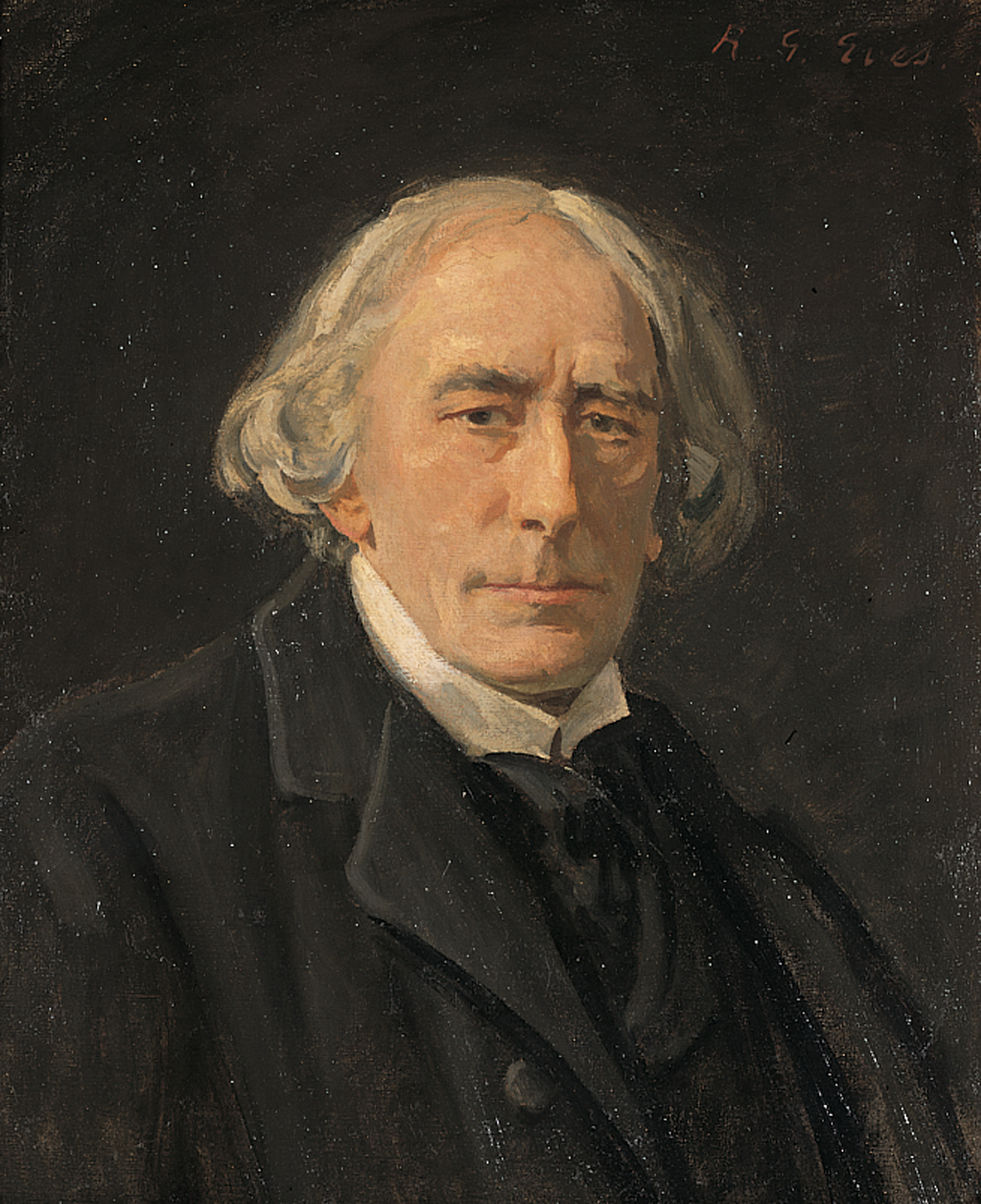
Late portrait of Irving by Reginald Eves

== Notes, reference and sources ==
=== Sources ===
- Archer, William (1883). Henry Irving, Actor and Manager: A Critical Study. London: Field and Tuer. OCLC 1046050125.
- Belford, Barbara (2002). Bram Stoker: A Biography of the Author of Dracula. London: Da Capo Press. OCLC 1319194680.
- Craig, Edward Gordon (1930). Henry Irving. London: J. M. Dent. OCLC 256254410.
- Crowther, Andrew (2011). Gilbert of Gilbert and Sullivan: His Life and Character. Stroud: The History Press. ISBN 978-0-7524-5589-1.
- Gaye, Freda, ed. (1967). Who's Who in the Theatre (fourteenth ed.). London: Sir Isaac Pitman and Sons. OCLC 5997224.
- Harvey, Richard (1983). Genealogy for Librarians. London: Bingley. ISBN 978-0-85-157408-0.
- Holroyd, Michael (2008). A Strange Eventful History: The Dramatic Lives of Ellen Terry, Henry Irving and their Remarkable Families. London: Chatto & Windus. ISBN 978-0-70-117987-8.
- Hughes, William (2009). Bram Stoker's Dracula: A Reader's Guide. London: A & C Black. ISBN 978-0-8264-9536-5.
- Irving, Laurence (1951). Henry Irving: The Actor and his World. London: Faber. OCLC 1149285969.
- Lyttelton, George; Rupert Hart-Davis (1979). Lyttelton–Hart-Davis Letters. London: John Murray. ISBN 978-0-7195-3673-1.
- Mander, Raymond; Joe Mitchenson (1961). The Theatres of London. London: Rupert Hart-Davis. OCLC 1151457675.
- Manvell, Roger (1968). Ellen Terry. London: Heinemann. ISBN 0-43-445000-6.
- Morley, Sheridan (1986). The Great Stage Actors. London: Angus and Robertson. ISBN 978-0-207-14970-2.
- Parker, John, ed. (1925). Who's Who in the Theatre (fifth ed.). London: Sir Isaac Pitman and Sons. OCLC 10013159.
- Shearer, Moira (1998). Ellen Terry. Stroud: Sutton. ISBN 0-75-091526-9.
- Stedman, Jane W. (1996). W. S. Gilbert, A Classic Victorian & His Theatre. Oxford: Oxford University Press. ISBN 978-0-19-816174-5.
- Stoker, Bram (1907). Personal Reminiscences of Henry Irving. London: Heinemann. OCLC 5869560.
- Tillett, Selwyn (1995). Arthur Sullivan (1842–1900): Macbeth, King Arthur, The Merry Wives of Windsor. Hong Kong: Marco Polo. OCLC 884174715.
- Warren, Louis S (October 2002). "Buffalo Bill Meets Dracula: William F. Cody, Bram Stoker, and the Frontiers of Racial Decay". The American Historical Review. 107 (4): 1124–1157. doi:10.1086/532666. (subscription required)
- West, E. J. (Autumn 1955). "Irving in Shakespeare: Interpretation or Creation?". Shakespeare Quarterly. 6 (4): 415–422. doi:10.2307/2866074. JSTOR 2866074. (subscription required)

== See also ==
- Irving Family
