= Culture of Manchester =

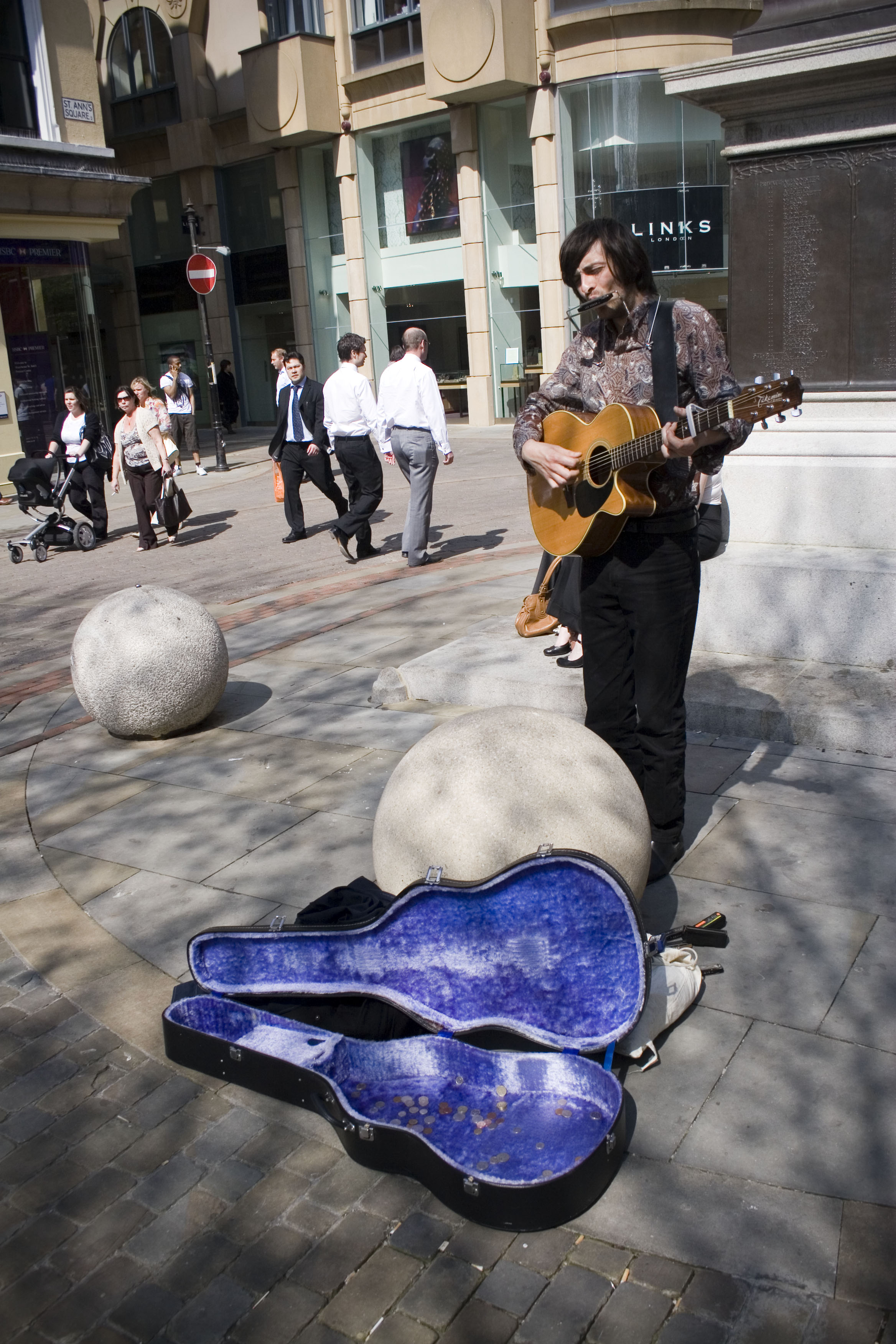
A busker in St Ann's Square

The Culture of Manchester is notable artistically, architecturally, theatrically and musically. Despite being the 5th largest city in the United Kingdom by population and the second largest conurbation, Manchester has been ranked as the second city of the United Kingdom in numerous polls since the 2000s (decade), with an influential culture scene helping to elevate Manchester's importance in the national psyche. This has helped the city's population grow by 20% in the last decade, and made the universities the most popular choices for undergraduate admission.

20th century broadcaster and social commentator Brian Redhead once said "Manchester ... is the capital, in every sense, of the North of England, where the modern world was born. The people know their geography is without equal. Their history is their response to it". Whilst Ian Brown of the Stone Roses has previously said that "Manchester has everything except a beach".

Often cited as the world's first industrialised city, with little pre-factory history to speak of, Manchester is the third most visited city in the United Kingdom after London and Edinburgh and is a major centre of the creative industries.

== Art and art galleries ==
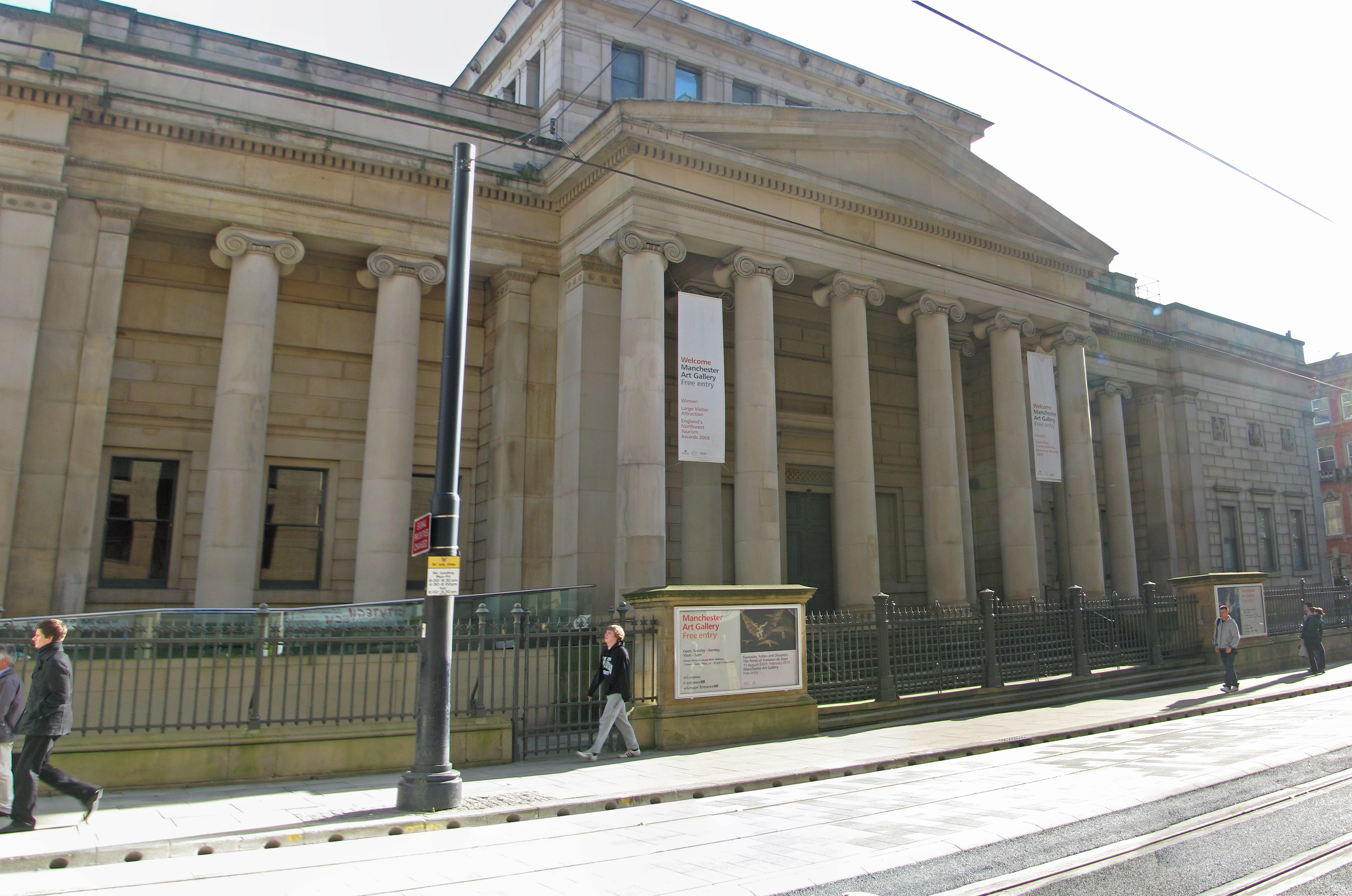
The City Art Gallery

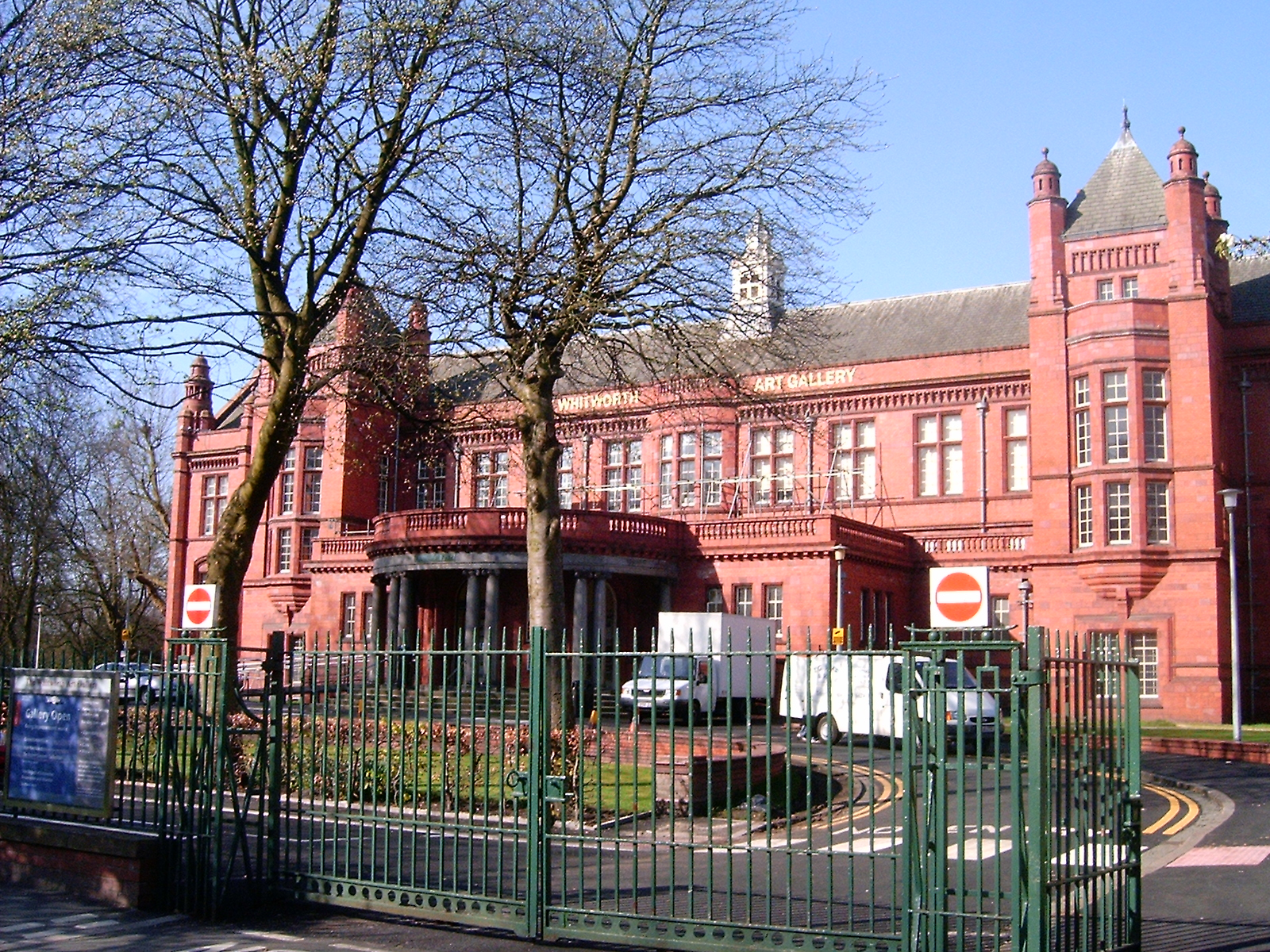
The Whitworth Art Gallery

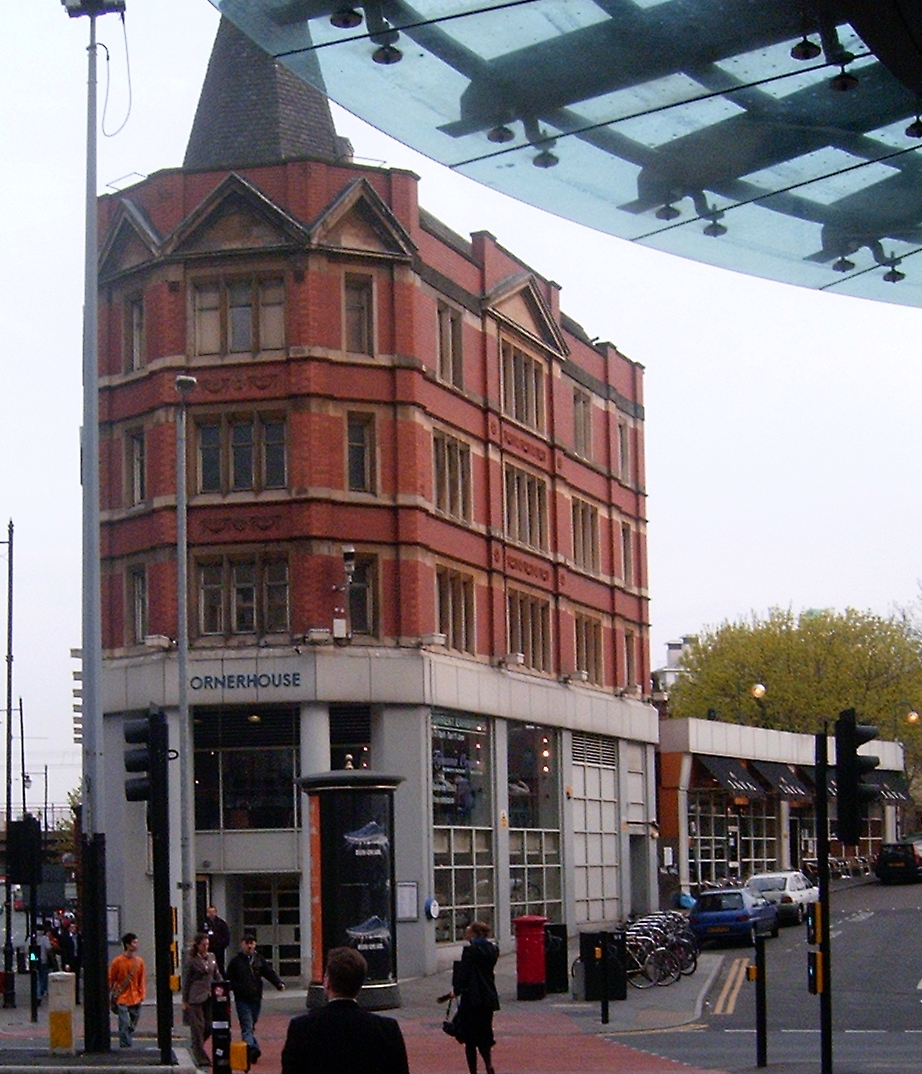
The Cornerhouse

The Art Treasures of Great Britain was an exhibition of fine art held in Manchester from 5 May to 17 October 1857. It remains the largest art exhibition to be held in the UK, possibly in the world, with over 16,000 works on display. It attracted over 1.3 million visitors in the 142 days it was open, about four times the population of Manchester at that time, with many visiting on organised railway excursions. Its selection and display of artworks had a formative influence on the public art collections which were being established in the UK at the time, such as the National Gallery, the National Portrait Gallery and the Victoria and Albert Museum.

There are several art galleries in Manchester, notably:

- Manchester Art Gallery
- Whitworth Art Gallery
- Esea contemporary
- Home
- Castlefield Gallery
- Urbis

The municipally owned Manchester Art Gallery on Mosley Street houses extensive displays of paintings by Italian and Flemish masters, as well as a notable collection of Pre-Raphaelite paintings, including works by Ford Madox Brown, Holman Hunt and Rossetti. A major Pre-Raphaelite work, The Manchester Murals, is a series of twelve paintings on the history of Manchester by Ford Madox Brown which were commissioned for the Great Hall of Manchester Town Hall in 1879. The Great Hall is open to the public, except during private functions.

Manchester's importance in the textile industry is reflected in the collections in the Whitworth Art Gallery, which also displays modern art and sculpture, including works by Epstein, Hepworth, van Gogh and Picasso.

Other exhibition spaces and museums in Manchester include the Smolensky Gallery, and the Manchester Costume Gallery at Platt Fields Park. The gallery at Fletcher Moss Botanical Garden in Didsbury has now closed.

Home was opened in 2015 as a merger of the exhibitions and cinemas in Cornerhouse, and the Library Theatre Company. It hosts exhibitions of both local and international art, including the biennial Manchester Open Exhibition.

The works of Stretford-born painter L. S. Lowry, known for his "matchstick" paintings of industrial Manchester and Salford, can be seen in both the Manchester Art Gallery and the Whitworth Art Gallery, and the Lowry art centre in Salford Quays (in the neighbouring borough of Salford) devotes a large permanent exhibition to his works. The French Impressionist painter Adolphe Valette spent a period of his life in Manchester and painted local scenes. The Irish sculptor John Cassidy worked in Manchester for most of his life and produced many fine works of sculpture. The Turner Prize-winning artist Chris Ofili hails from Manchester.

== Architecture ==
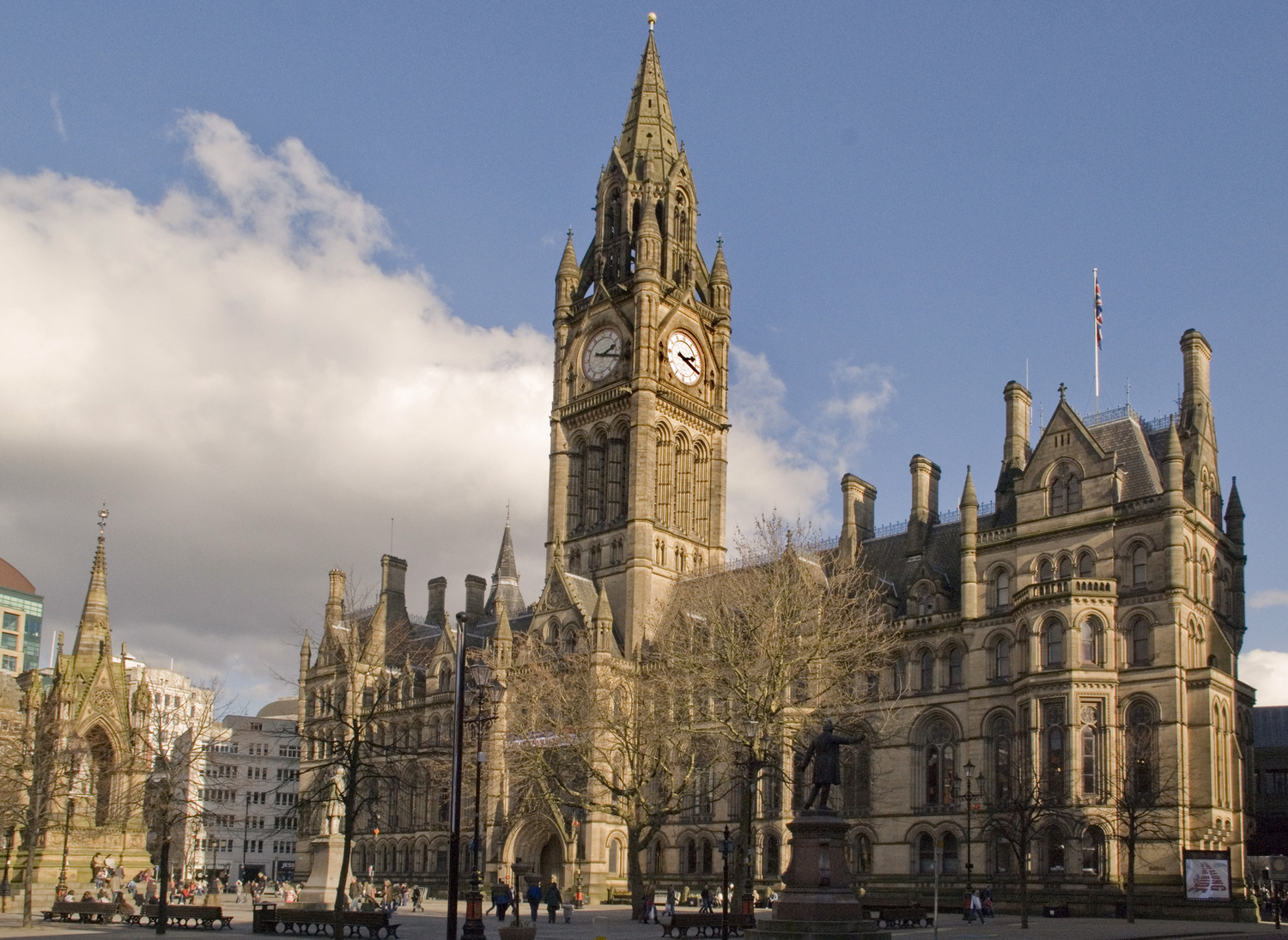
Manchester Town Hall, an example of Victorian Gothic revival architecture

The architecture of Manchester demonstrates a wide variety of architectural styles, from early 19th century Neoclassical and Victorian through to the most modern. Much of the architecture in the city harks back to its former days as a global centre for the cotton trade. Many warehouses have now been converted for other uses but the external appearance remains mostly unchanged so the city keeps much of its original character. An interesting facet of the architecture of Manchester and several other cities which underwent a construction boom during the Industrial Revolution is that inspiration was taken from Venice. Examples of this architecture can be easily found to the south and east of Albert Square and near the 92nd lock of the Bridgewater Canal, near the Beetham Tower.

Manchester also has a number of skyscrapers. Most were built during the 1960s and 1970s. However, in the 21st century, there has been a renewed interest in building skyscrapers in Manchester. Numerous residential and office blocks are being built or have recently been built in the city centre. The Beetham Tower was completed in the autumn of 2006 and houses a Hilton hotel along with a restaurant and residential properties. It was the tallest building in the UK outside London until November 2018, when it was surpassed by the South Tower at Deansgate Square, which is 201 m (659 ft) tall.

== Museums ==
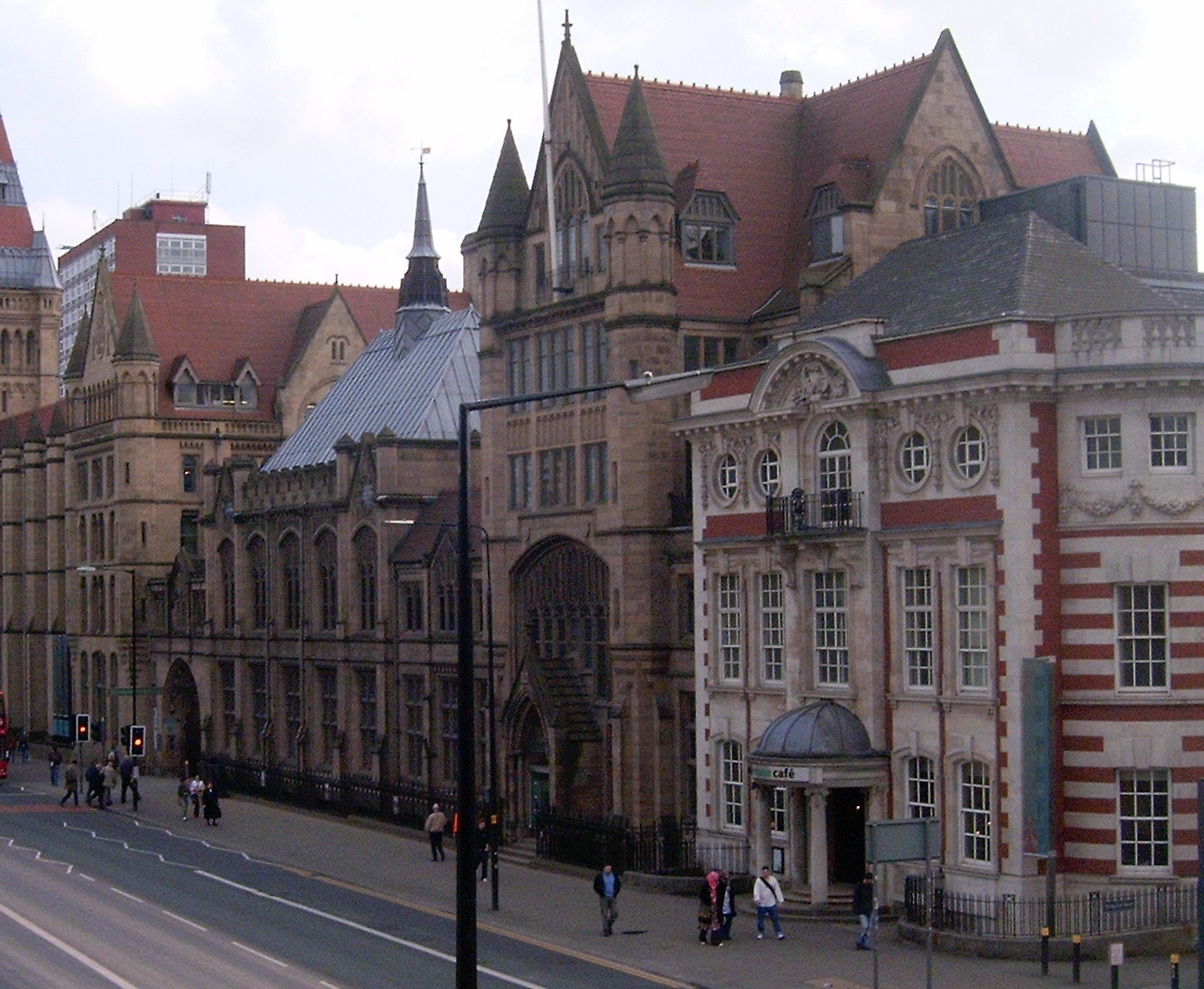
Manchester Museum

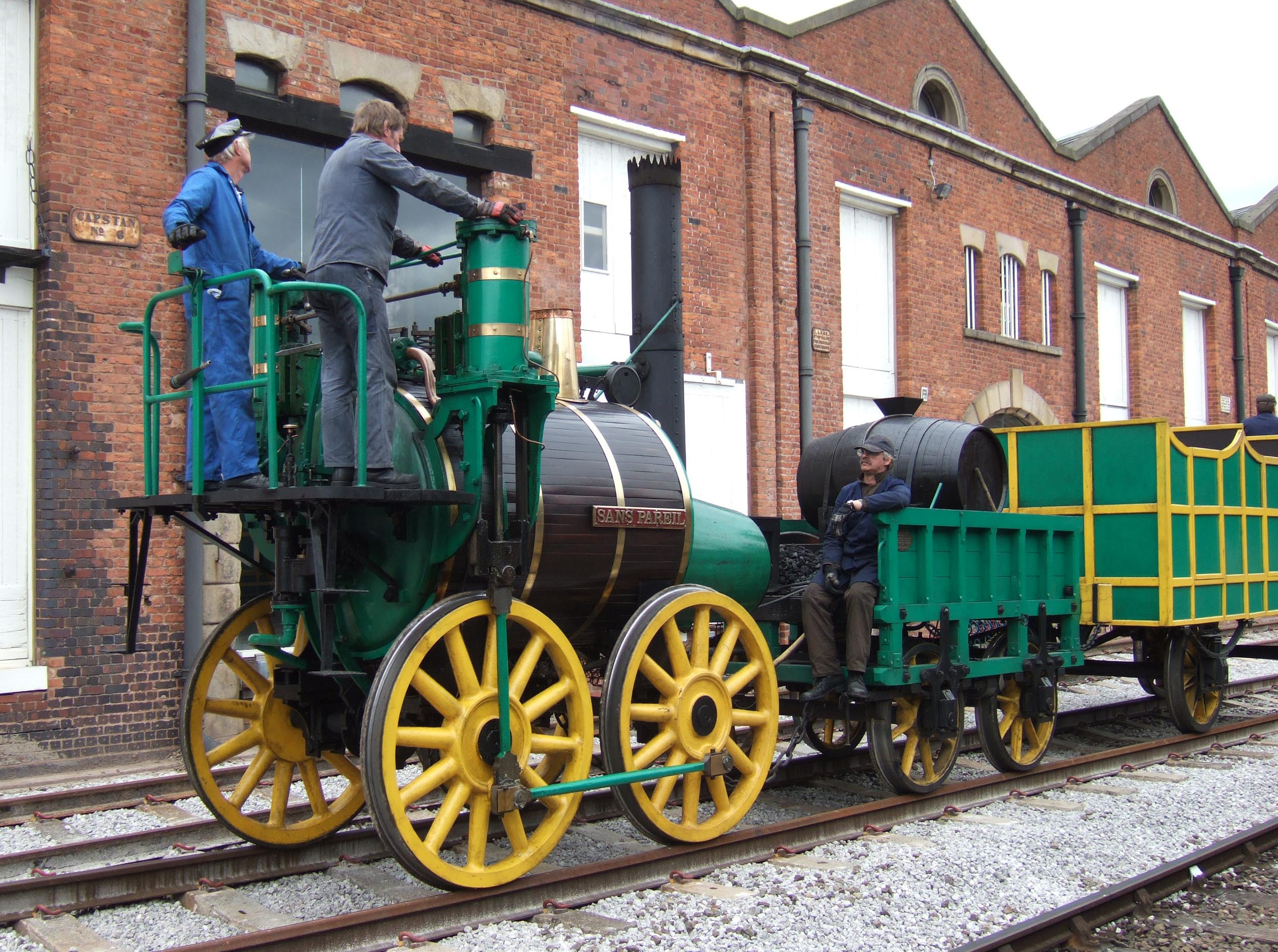
Science and Industry Museum

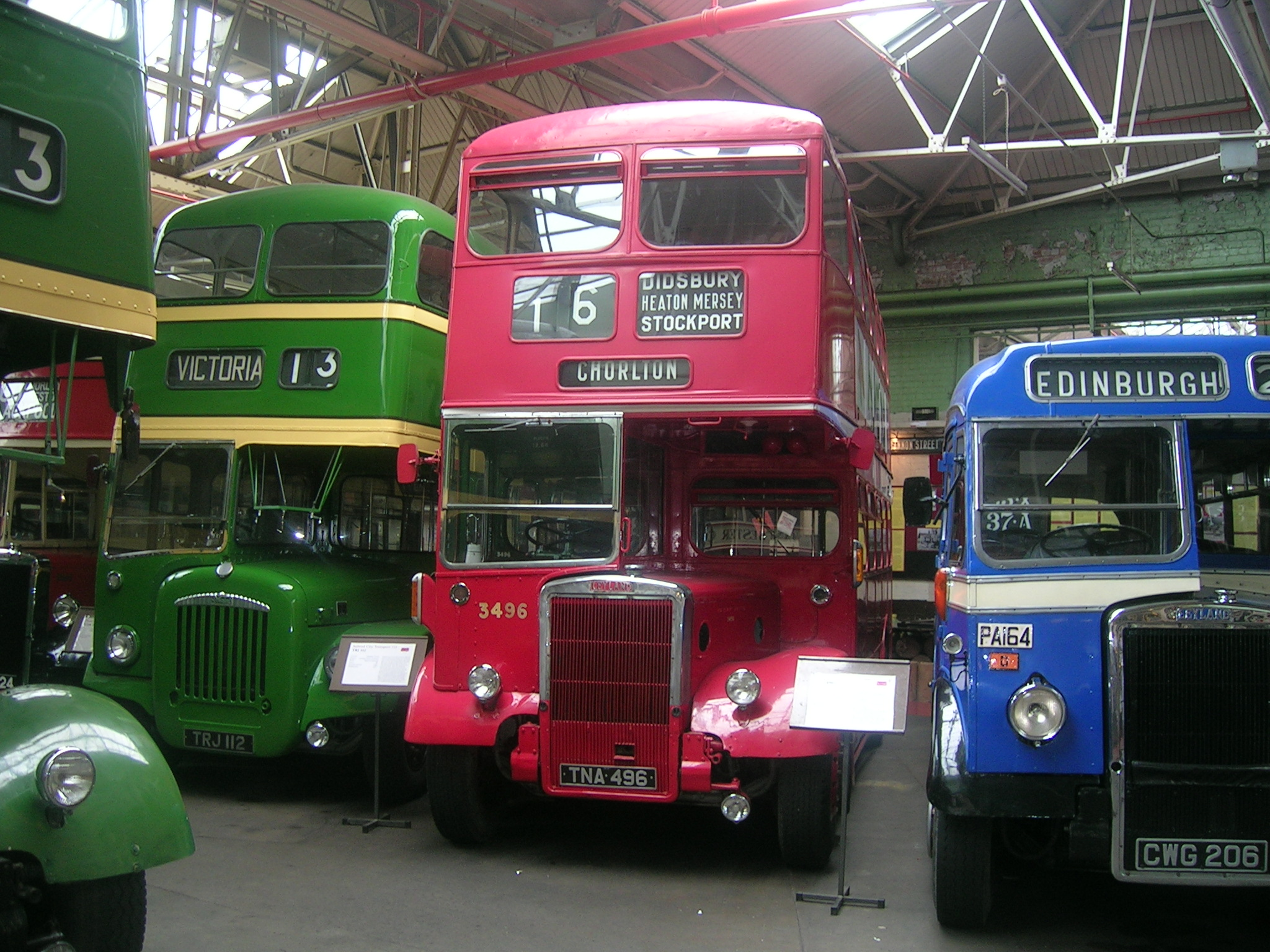
Museum of Transport

Museums in Manchester include:

- Manchester Jewish Museum
- Manchester Museum
- Science and Industry Museum, an Anchor Point
  of ERIH (European Route of Industrial Heritage)
- Manchester Museum of Transport
- National Football Museum
- Pankhurst Centre
- People's History Museum
- Gallery of Costume
- Heaton Hall

Manchester Museum opened to the public in 1888, has notable collections in archaeology, particularly Egyptology, and in natural history, particularly in botany, entomology and palaeontology.

In the Castlefield district, a reconstructed part of the Roman fort of Mamucium is open to the public in Castlefield. Manchester's rich industrial heritage is celebrated in the Science and Industry Museum, also in Castlefield. This large collection of steam locomotives, working machines from the Industrial Revolution, aircraft and space vehicles is appropriately housed in the former Liverpool Road railway station, the terminus of the world's first passenger railway. Transport heritage in Manchester is also presented in the Museum of Transport in Cheetham Hill. Salford Quays, a short distance from the city centre in the adjoining borough of Trafford, is home to Imperial War Museum North.

Other museums in Manchester reflect the history of the city's people; the People's History Museum presents the history of the work and politics in the city, commemorating the Peterloo Massacre, and Manchester's strong association with the Trade union movement, Women's suffrage and football.

Manchester, being situated in North West England is also a hugely popular footballing city and its football past is remembered at the home stadiums of the cities' Premier League clubs, Manchester City and Manchester United. Both have museums at the City of Manchester Stadium and Old Trafford football stadium.

Furthermore, the National Football Museum is moving to Urbis in Manchester city centre and will become its new permanent home. The move to Manchester is aimed at maximising the museum's visitor rates - it is predicted the move will boost visitor rate fourhold to 400,000 rather the 100,000 annual visitors at its previous home in Preston. The new National Football Museum is due to open in late 2011.

In Cheetham Hill, the Manchester Jewish Museum tells the story of the Jewish community in Manchester from the Industrial Revolution to the present day.

== Music ==
In Elizabethan times the Court Leet of the manor of Manchester appointed town waits to undertake certain duties, one of which was of "playing morning and evening together, according as others have been heretofore accustomed to do". In 1603 they welcomed into their company a more skilful musician and it was then ordered that "the said waits shall hereafter be received to play music at all and every wedding and dinners in this town".

In 1918 the Education Committee appointed a Music Adviser to the schools of the city who encouraged the formation of school choirs and orchestras and the teaching of musical appreciation and the playing of instruments.

According to C.H. Herford (writing in 1915): "Music has been said to divide with Mammon the devotion of the people of Manchester. Possibly this sets their musical enthusiasm too high; but music has some chance of being that one of the fine arts to which her climate is least unkind."

=== Classical music ===
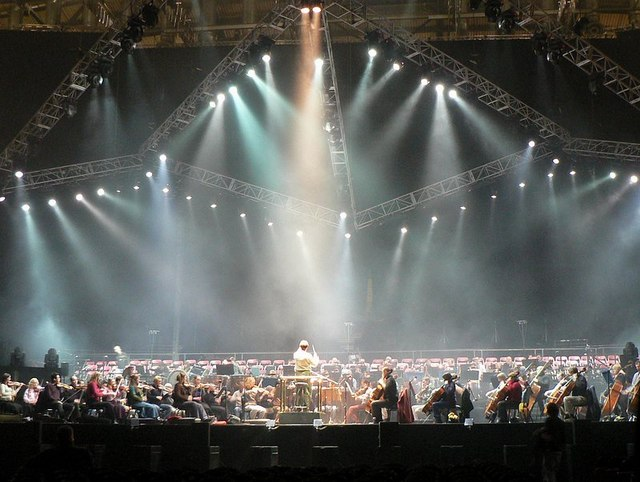
The Hallé Orchestra

Manchester has two symphony orchestras, the Hallé and the BBC Philharmonic. There is also a chamber orchestra, the Manchester Camerata, and the Gorton Philharmonic Orchestra, an amateur orchestra founded in 1854. In the 1950s, the city was home to the so-called 'Manchester School' of classical composers, which comprised Harrison Birtwistle, Peter Maxwell Davies, David Ellis and Alexander Goehr. Manchester is a centre for musical education, with the Royal Northern College of Music and Chetham's School of Music. Forerunners of the RNCM were the Northern School of Music (founded 1920) and the Royal Manchester College of Music (founded 1893). The Gentlemen's Concerts were begun in the year 1765 by a group of amateurs who ten years later built their own Concert Rooms on Fountain Street with space for an audience of 900. The name of Concert Lane is derived from this building. A later venue for these concerts was in Lower Mosley Street (on the site of the present Midland Hotel).

From the 1820s, the large and responsive public of the town began to attract singers and instrumentalists. Franz Liszt visited Manchester in 1824 (aged 13) and again in 1840. His performances were highly praised in the Manchester Guardian. In 1828 and 1836 the Manchester Festivals were well covered by the Manchester Guardian whose writers found much of the performances which included a Beethoven symphony to be of a fine quality, though they had mixed opinions of the singing of Mr Braham. Maria Malibran, the French singer, appeared at the festival of 1836 having been injured in a fall from her horse in July which led to her death on 23 September. Though buried in the Collegiate Church she was afterwards exhumed and reburied at Brussels. A medallion of her was sculpted by William Bally which was presented to the Henry Watson Music Library. Felix Mendelssohn conducted a performance of his oratorio Elijah in the Free Trade Hall, Manchester, in 1847. In 1848 Frédéric Chopin, already suffering from serious illness, came to play in a Manchester concert and the Guardian writer noted his extraordinary subtleties of tone and feeling.

Nymphs and Shepherds

Nymphs and shepherds, come away.
In ye groves let's sport and play,
For this is Flora's holiday,
Sacred to ease and happy love,
To dancing, to music and to poetry;
Your flocks may now securely rove
Whilst you express your jollity.
Nymphs and shepherds, come away.

Both the Ring and the Meistersinger by Richard Wagner were performed in Manchester in the autumn of 1913. Musical ensembles active in the early 20th century included the Gentlemen's Glee Club, the Manchester Vocal Society and the Brodsky Quartette. In 1929 the 250-strong Manchester Children's Choir recorded Henry Purcell's "Nymphs and Shepherds" and the Evening Benediction from Hansel and Gretel with the Hallé Orchestra at the Free Trade Hall. The recording was made on 24 June 1929 for Columbia Records and followed a year of rehearsals by the 60 boys and 190 girls who took part. Musical training for the choir had begun when Sir Hamilton Harty, the conductor of the Hallé Orchestra, was engaged by the Education Committee to contribute to musical education in schools. The recordings were an unexpected success and the discs (with Nymphs on the A-side and the Benediction on the B-side) sold over a million copies.

In 1989 EMI awarded it a Gold Disc and after BBC Radio 4 played the recording in December 1989, it was re-released as part of the compilation record Hello Children Everywhere. The choir was disbanded after the recording but members were reunited in 1979 and the golden jubilee of the choir's formation was celebrated at a civic reception at the town hall.

For many years the city's main classical venue was the Free Trade Hall on Peter Street. Since 1996, however, Manchester has had a modern 2,500 seat concert venue called the Bridgewater Hall in Lower Mosley Street, which is also home to the Hallé Orchestra. The hall is one of the country's most technically advanced classical music and lecture venues, with an acoustically designed interior and suspended foundations for an optimum sound. Other venues for classical concerts include the RNCM, the Royal Exchange Theatre and Manchester Cathedral.

=== Brass band music ===
Brass band music, a tradition in the North of England, is an important part of Manchester's musical heritage; some of the UK's leading bands, such as the CWS (Manchester) Band and the Fairey Band of Heaton Chapel, are from Manchester and surrounding areas, and the Whit Friday brass band contest takes place annually in the neighbouring areas of Saddleworth and Tameside.

=== Pop music ===
Manchester had a significant pop music scene in the 1960s and early 1970s, with bands such as The Hollies, The Bee Gees, Herman's Hermits, and 10cc preceding the renowned Sex Pistols' performance at the Lesser Free Trade Hall in 1976 which led directly to the formation of a wave of important bands whose acclaim spread internationally. These include artists like the Buzzcocks, the Smiths and the Fall, as well as one of the most significant independent labels of the time, Tony Wilson's Factory Records, home to many major groups originating locally including Joy Division and New Order.

The "Madchester" music scene brought much media attention to the city from the late 1980s to the beginning of the 1990s. Bands such as the Stone Roses, Happy Mondays, the Charlatans, the Inspiral Carpets and James mixed alternative rock, psychedelic rock and dance music to create a sound which led to commercial success in the indie rock field and a wider musical influence nationally. The '90s brought forth Manchester's popular band, Oasis.

The Chemical Brothers (from Southern England) formed in Manchester. Also, ex-Stone Roses frontman Ian Brown has forged a successful solo career, as has ex-Smiths' leadman Morrissey. Among the others born in the Manchester area are Richard Ashcroft, front man of alternative rock group the Verve, and Jay Kay, the singer and mastermind of the acid jazz band Jamiroquai.

In 1965, on the U.S. Billboard Hot 100, a unique hat-trick of consecutive number 1s took place in the spring, all from Mancunian pop groups. Freddie and the Dreamers spent two weeks at the top with "I'm Telling You Now" (April 10–24), Wayne Fontana and the Mindbenders one week with "Game of Love" (24 April-1 May), and finally Herman's Hermits with "Mrs Brown, You've Got a Lovely Daughter", a further three weeks (1–22 May), a total of six weeks, an achievement never matched even in the UK Top 50.

Manchester's main pop music venue is the Co-op Live, which opened in 2024. It is the largest indoor arena in the United Kingdom by capacity, and can accommodate 23,500 attendees. This is followed by the Manchester Arena, situated next to Manchester Victoria railway station, which seats over 21,000. In 2001, the Manchester Arena was voted International Arena of the Year. Other major venues include the Manchester Apollo and the Manchester Academy. Smaller venues are the Band on the Wall, the Bierkeller, the Roadhouse, the Night and Day Café the Ruby Lounge and the Deaf Institute.

The famous American anti-war hippie musical from the late 1960s, Hair, includes a song entitled "Manchester, England" though the mention of the city in the song's title is somewhat irrelevant and merely used as punctuation in the song's lyrics.

== Literature ==
=== 16th and 17th centuries ===
Méric Casaubon published some of the papers left by Dr John Dee, for a time Warden of the Collegite Church, in 1659, together with a long introduction critical of their author, as A True & Faithful Relation of What passed for many Yeers between Dr. John Dee (A Mathematician of Great Fame in Q. Eliz. and King James their Reignes) and some spirits. As the first public revelation of Dee's spiritual conferences, the book was extremely popular and sold quickly. Dee's Diary was published in 1842 by the Chetham Society.

An account of Manchester written by a native of the town, Richard Hollingworth (1607–56), and entitled Mancuniensis: or, A history of the towne of Manchester, and what is most memorable concerning it was edited and published by William Willis in 1839.

=== 18th and 19th centuries ===
The poet John Byrom was born in the town in 1691. His writings are mainly in Latin but he is chiefly remembered for his Christmas hymn "Christians, Awake". He is also the author of a diary and of an idyll "Colin and Phoebe".

In 1719 the first newspaper published in Manchester, the Manchester Weekly Journal, began publication and in the same year the first book to be published there was a volume of mathematical lectures by John Jackson.

The Manchester Literary and Philosophical Society was founded as a learned society in Manchester in 1781. Its activities have been much more significant in the sciences than in the arts, including literature. Its members have included Peter Mark Roget (author of the thesaurus), Ernest Rutherford and Joseph Whitworth. The first formal meeting of the society took place on 14 March 1781.

James Thyer, librarian of Chetham's Library, edited the Remains of Samuel Butler, the author of Hudibras which had until Thyer published them in 1759 been unpublished. James Ogden was the author of two epic poems: The British Lion Rouz'd (1762) and The Revolution: an Epic Poem in Twelve Books (1790). Richard Wroe, Warden of the Collegiate Church, who was nicknamed "Silver-tongued Wroe" because of his fine preaching published in 1782 a treatise on The Beauty of Unity. Another local clergyman, Thomas Seddon, had published in 1779 a set of lampoons entitled Characteristic Strictures upon a Series of (Imaginary) Portraits.".

Samuel Bamford, born at Middleton in 1788, was a weaver and poet and also active in radical politics in the Manchester district. He is also notable for his autobiography, Passages in the Life of a Radical. The writer Thomas De Quincey was born at Manchester and in early life moved to Greenheys. He attended Manchester Grammar School and is best known for his Confessions of an English Opium Eater. William Harrison Ainsworth (born in 1805) also went to Manchester Grammar School. He wrote many historical novels some of which relate to the history of Lancashire, including The Manchester Rebels which tells the story of six soldiers from the grammar school who fought in the Jacobite cause in 1745.

Three members of the Wilson family of Manchester in the early 19th century gained a considerable reputation as poets. Between 1842 and 1866 four editions of their poetical works were published (as The Songs of the Wilsons). Michael Wilson (1763–1840) was a printer and furniture broker who favoured "Jacobinism" in politics. Among his seven sons were Thomas Wilson (died 1852) and Alexander Wilson (1804–46) who like their father wrote poetry. Thomas was imprisoned for smuggling gold, while Alexander (also a self-taught painter) was responsible for compiling the collected verse of the three Wilsons. He died suddenly and his grave at Cheetham Hill has an epitaph composed by Elijah Ridings.

In the 19th century, Manchester figured in novels that discussed the changes that industrialisation had brought to Britain. These included Mary Barton: a tale of Manchester life (1848) by Elizabeth Gaskell The factual study The Condition of the Working Class in England in 1844 was written by Friedrich Engels while living and working in Manchester and drew largely on his observations on the life of the working people of Manchester and Salford.

Charles Dickens is reputed to have set his novel Hard Times in the city, and while it is partly modelled on Preston, it shows the influence of his friend Elizabeth Gaskell.

John Howard Nodal was president (1873–79) of the Manchester Literary Club, and started its annual volumes of 'Papers' which he edited from 1874–79. For the glossary committee of the Literary Club he wrote in 1873 a paper on the 'Dialect and Archaisms of Lancashire,' and, in conjunction with George Milner, compiled a 'Glossary of the Lancashire Dialect' (2 parts, 1875–82). The Transactions of the Manchester Literary Club began in 1874 and the title was soon changed to the Papers of the Manchester Literary Club which continued to be published until 1991. The founder members of the club included the dialect poets Richard Rome Bealey (1828–87), Ben Brierley and Edwin Waugh. Other dialect poets who were members were James Dawson, Junior. (1840–1906) and Joseph Ramsbottom (1831–1901).

Charlotte Brontë began writing Jane Eyre in Manchester in 1846. Bronte started writing at the Salutation Lodge (now a public house) on the fringe of the city centre on Higher Chatham Street in Hulme - a few blocks away from Oxford Road. Brontë was in Manchester to take her father, Patrick, for a cataracts operation and a blue plaque adorns the building where Bronte began writing the novel.

The novel, The Manchester Man, by Mrs. G. Linnaeus Banks, was first serialised in Cassell's Magazine before being published in three volumes in 1876, and became the author's most lasting achievement. It is considered to be an important social and historical novel, charting the rise of Jabez Clegg, the eponymous "Manchester Man", from the time of the Napoleonic Wars to the first Reform Act. His personal fortunes, from the near tragic snatch of his crib from the River Irk, create a tale of romance and melodrama, his life from apprentice to master and from poverty to wealth, mirroring the growth and prosperity of the city. This is achieved in a politico-historical setting, with vivid accounts of the Peterloo Massacre or Manchester Massacre of 1819 and the Corn-Law riots (the Anti-Corn Law League was formed in Manchester in 1838). In 1896, the year before she died, a well-illustrated edition of The Manchester Man was published with forty-six plates and three maps. The book is still read throughout the world (following republication in 1991 and again in 1998), and its heroes, Jabez Clegg and Joshua Brooks, are commemorated locally in the names of Manchester public houses. j Edward Abbott Parry (born in London in 1863) was a judge and dramatist who lived in Manchester as judge of Manchester County Court 1894–1911. and became Judge of Lambeth County Court in 1911. He wrote several plays and books for children.

Poets' Corner was a name given to the Sun Inn in Long Millgate which was a meeting place for poets and other writers. The Sun Inn was reputed in 1877 to be over 250 years old; at that time it was used as a store for rope and twine.

=== 20th and 21st centuries ===
Howard Spring, a Welsh novelist born in 1889, spent a period of his life as a journalist in Manchester and set his first novel, Shabby Tiger (1934) there (one of the main characters is the glamorous and ambitious Rachel Rosing). He followed it by a sequel, Rachel Rosing.

Louis Golding (born in Manchester in 1895 into a Ukrainian-Jewish family) was educated at Manchester Grammar School and Queen's College, Oxford. He used his Manchester background (as 'Doomington') and Jewish themes in his novels, the first of which was published while he was still an undergraduate (his student time was interrupted by service in World War I).

The Manchester novelist Maurice Procter (born 1906) was an early author of police procedural novels. Procter's Hell Is a City (1954) is set in a fictionalised Manchester, later filmed in the city with lead roles for Donald Pleasence and Stanley Baker.

Anthony Burgess (born 1917), author of A Clockwork Orange, was born and educated in Manchester. Little Wilson and Big God, the first volume of his autobiography, includes a detailed account of his early life in the city between 1917 and 1940.

Howard Jacobson, born in Prestwich in 1942, an area with a strong Jewish community, has written about post-war Manchester in The Mighty Walzer (1999) and Kalooki Nights (2006).

The German writer W. G. Sebald (born 1944) lived in Manchester when he first settled in England, and the city features prominently in his novel The Emigrants.

The Scottish crime writer Val McDermid (born 1955) lived in the city for many years and set her Lindsay Gordon and Kate Brannigan series in Manchester.

Jeff Noon (born in Droylsden in 1957) set his early novels, including Vurt, in a future dystopian Manchester.

Nicholas Blincoe set his first three novels in Manchester, including Acid Casuals (1995), based around the Haçienda nightclub and Manchester Slingback (1998), focusing on the Gay Village. Carl Hart's druggy lovestory The Obvious Game (2006) is set amongst the straight and gay night life of Manchester in the early 1990s. Wilfred Hopkins, under the pseudonym Billy Hopkins, has written Our Kid and other works.

Carcanet Press began publishing poetry collections and novels in the early 1970s under the editorship of Michael Schmidt Schmidt was one of the first directors of the Manchester Metropolitan University Writers' School, whose staff currently includes Simon Armitage and Carol Ann Duffy. This school and the University of Manchester's Centre for New Writing are two of the top creative writing schools in the country. Since 2006 there has been a Manchester Literature Festival.

Since 2000, Manchester Cathedral has sponsored the International Religious Poetry Competition. Judges have included Michael Schmidt, Michael Symmons Roberts and Linda Chase. In 2010 the cathedral re-established its Young Poets' Competition, a national competition open to all schools and all children from Key Stage 1-5. On 23 January 2010, the cathedral announced the appointment of its first Poet-in-Residence, Rachel Mann. On 21 October 2010, the cathedral hosted the inaugural Manchester Sermon. Developed in collaboration with the Manchester Literature Festival, the event was aimed at revitalizing the sermon as a literary form. The inaugural sermon was delivered by the internationally known novelist Jeanette Winterson.

Carol Ann Duffy, the UK's Poet Laureate as of July 2013, is a resident of Manchester and read her work "The Crown" at Queen Elizabeth II's 60th coronation anniversary ceremony.

Writing circles in Manchester include Manchester Speculative Fiction, Monday Night Group, Muslim Writers North and Manchester Women Writers.

Manchester was awarded City of Literature status in 2017.

== Theatre ==
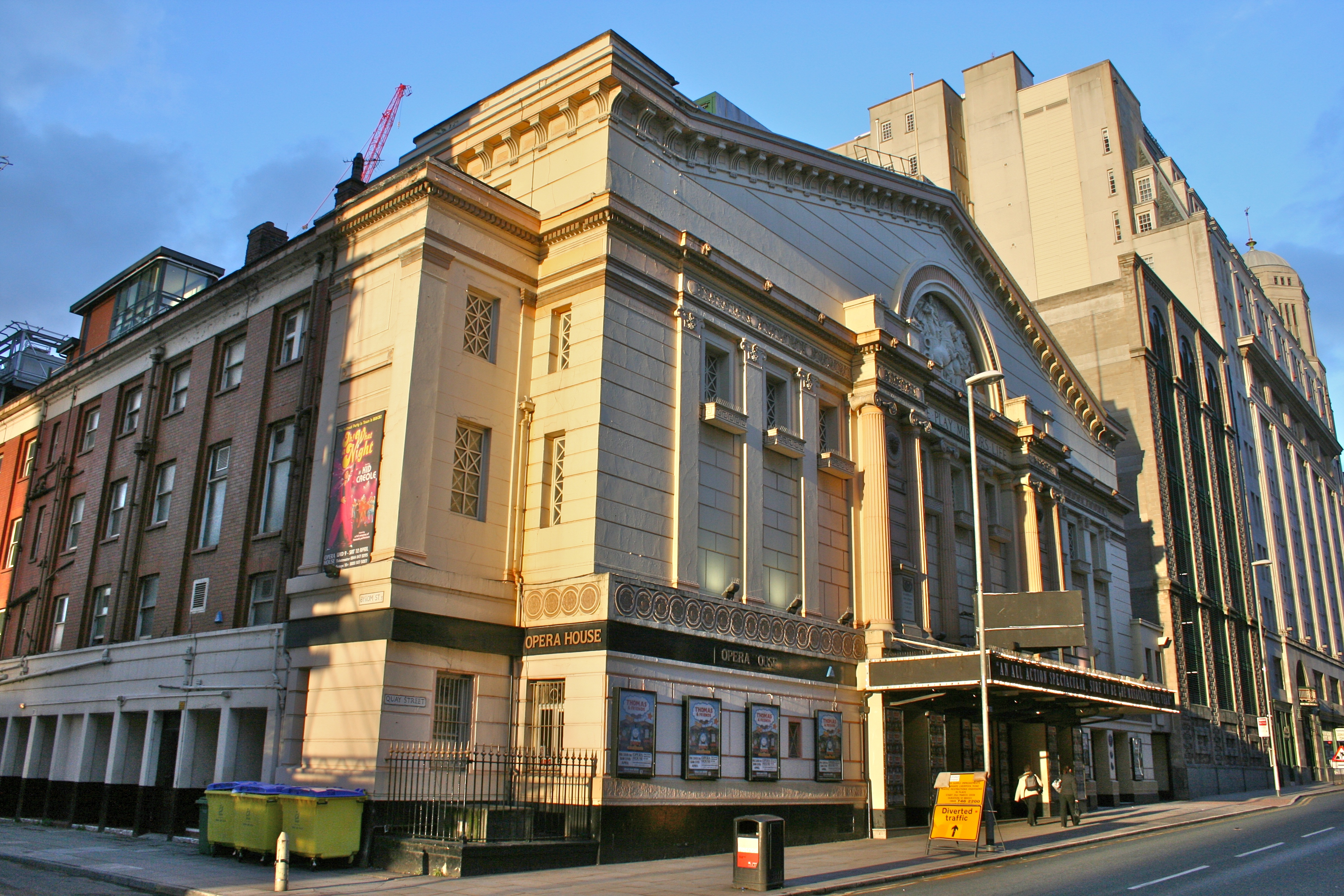
Manchester Opera House on Quay Street

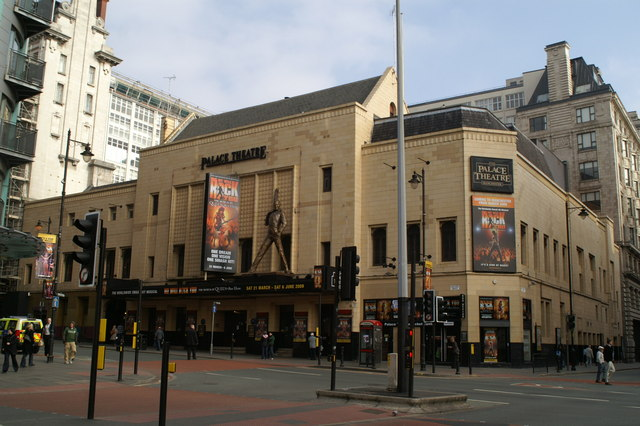
The Palace Theatre on Oxford Street

The first theatre in Manchester was the Theatre Royal, established in 1775. The town soon became one of the stock company centres with a group of resident actors who supported the travelling "stars". Great actors and actresses who appeared on the Manchester stage included the Kembles and the Keans, Macready, Henry Irving and Sir Johnston Forbes-Robertson. In the latter half of the 19th century the Prince's Theatre in Oxford Street was the scene of a series of public-spirited dramatic enterprises, including those remarkable Shakespearean revivals organised successively by John Knowles and Charles Calvert. Several other theatres, especially the Gaiety and the Queen's, had in the meantime begun to provide entertainment of varying quality for the growing theatrical public. These included a further series of Shakespearean revivals given at the Queen's Theatre by Messrs. Flanagan and Louis Calvert. The Independent Theatre staged some of the plays of Henrik Ibsen for the first time in England outside London. The first British repertory theatre was opened at the Gaiety Theatre in Peter Street in 1908 by Annie E.F. Horniman with great success. Productions were of a high standard and the plays included works by Ibsen, Synge, W. B. Yeats, George Bernard Shaw, Verhaeren, Gerhart Hauptmann, Sudermann and Euripides, as well as some of the English classical dramatists. Among dramatists of the early 20th century mention should be made of Stanley Houghton whose dramas were performed on the Gaiety stage.

The "Manchester School" is a term applied to a number of playwrights from Manchester who were active in the early 20th century. The leading figures in the group were Harold Brighouse, Stanley Houghton and Allan Monkhouse. They were championed by Annie Horniman, owner of the Gaiety Theatre.

Manchester is noted for its excellent theatres. Larger venues include the Manchester Opera House, Quay Street, a commercial theatre promoting large scale touring shows which often plays host to touring West End shows, the Palace Theatre, Oxford Street, and the Royal Exchange Theatre, a small producing theatre in Manchester's former Cotton Exchange. The Library Theatre was a small producing theatre situated in the basement of the city's Central Library, and the Lowry Centre is a large touring venue in Salford.

Smaller sites include the Green Room which focuses on fringe productions, the Contact Theatre, a theatre on the university campus for young people with a bold contemporary design, and the King's Arms Theatre, the theatre and music venue at Bloom Street, Salford. The Dancehouse is a theatre dedicated to dance productions. The city is also home to two highly regarded drama schools; the Manchester Metropolitan University School of Theatre and the Arden School of Theatre. Unlike Arden, the former is accredited by the NCDT (National Council for Drama Training) and is a member of the Conference of Drama Schools. In addition the Royal Northern College of Music (RNCM) has four theatre spaces especially noted for opera and classical music productions. Manchester Theatres provides a guide to the theatres in the city and its environs.

== Sport ==
Sports in the city of Manchester are an important part of the city's culture, with SportCity being a dedicated district in east Manchester for sports such as football, athletics and cycling.

Manchester City and Manchester United are popular Premier League clubs in Manchester, however United are technically outside of the City of Manchester boundaries in Stretford in the borough of Trafford.

Although Manchester does not technically fall within the Lancashire county boundaries since 1974, Lancashire County Cricket Club is still based in the area and formed in 1865 replacing Manchester Cricket Club.

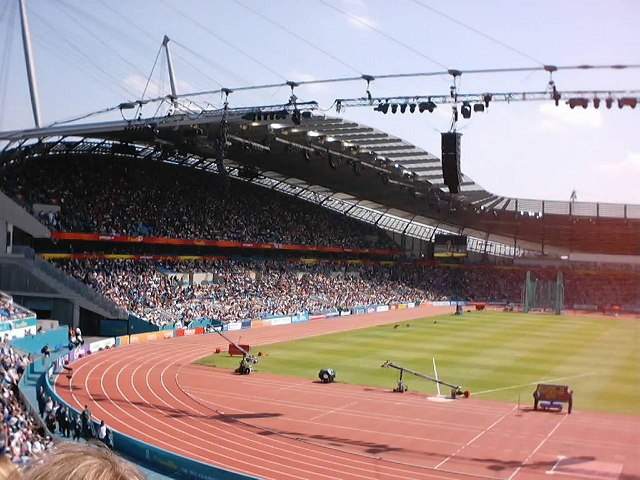
The City of Manchester Stadium during the 2002 Commonwealth Games

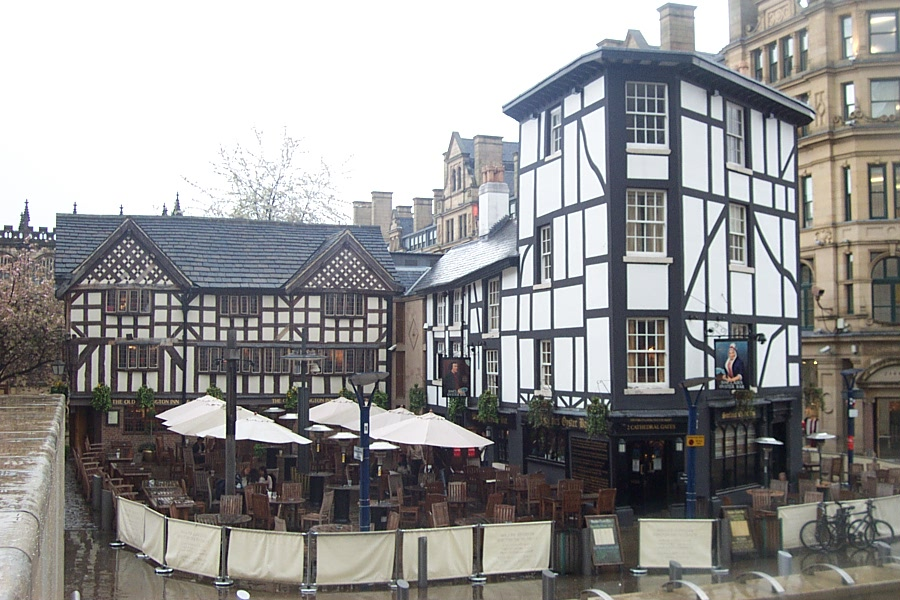
Pubs in Exchange Square

Manchester has competed twice to host the Olympic Games, being beaten into fourth place by Atlanta in 1996 and coming third to Sydney in 2000. Instead, it was decided Manchester would host the 2002 Commonwealth Games with many first class sporting facilities being built for the games, including the City of Manchester Stadium, the Manchester Velodrome, the National Squash Centre and the Manchester Aquatics Centre. The 2002 games were considered a success, surpassing all expectations and demonstrated Manchester as a reinvigorated city for the 21st century whilst giving London impetus to bid for the 2012 Olympic Games.

== Public houses ==
In 1588 a local magistrate complained that the town had an "excessive number of ale houses". In 1974 Manchester and Salford city centres were described as having over 200 pubs, the majority of which were of Victorian origin. However many of the Victorian era pubs had disappeared by the 1970s; for example Deansgate contained 38 as early as 1825 while in 1974 these had been reduced to merely four. Of very early pubs the Seven Stars in Withy Grove had disappeared while the Wellington Inn and Sinclair's Oyster House had been removed from their original sites. In 1841 the police engaged in a clean up operation and it was said that over a third of the pub landlords were convicted for failing to keep order in their premises. A local variant of the pub is the Yates's Wine Lodge which provides a good range of wines in spartan surroundings. Internally pubs consisted traditionally of a vault (public bar), snug and lounge. By the 1970s there was a tendency for these to be converted into a single large room. In the 1974 survey the following games were noted as being played: bar billiards (only one pub), pin ball (ten pubs), pool ("an increasingly popular game") and table football (13 pubs). Almost all the pubs were then tied houses and only 20 were free houses.

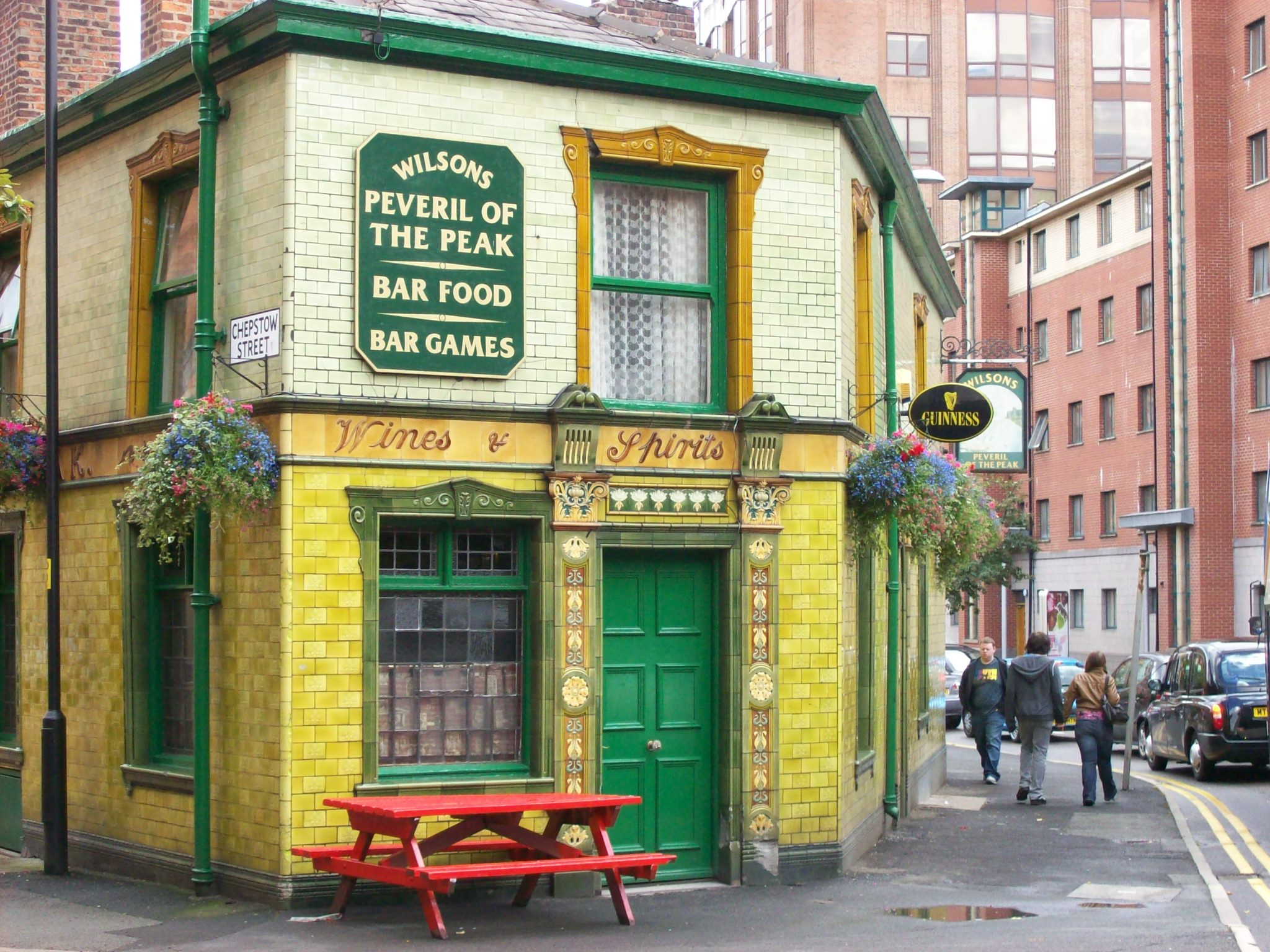
The Peveril of the Peak

The following old pubs are mentioned and illustrated in Thomas Ashworth's Sketches of Old Manchester and Salford (1877): the Wellington Inn, Market Place; the Vintner's Arms, Smithy Door; the Seven Stars, Withy Grove; the Rover's Return, Shudehill; and the Bull's Head, Greengate, Salford. The historic "Rover's Return" in Withy Grove, which occupied a 14th-century building, at some period became a licensed house but ceased to be so in 1924. The building stood until 1958 when the City Council had it demolished.

== Nightlife ==
There has long been a thriving nightclub culture in Manchester. Broadcaster Jimmy Savile is credited as becoming the first modern DJ by using twin turntables for continuous play after he obtained two domestic record decks welded together. He first used this device to play to the public in 1946, at a nightclub called the Ritz on Whitworth Street West (which had opened in 1927). Tony Prince is credited as becoming the world's first full-time club DJ in 1964 when Savile, who was then a Mecca manager in Manchester, told him that Top Rank considered him to be the first person to be on their payroll as a pure DJ.

Many teenagers of the 1960s developed a love for Northern Soul, which had as two of its epicentres the Wigan Casino and Manchester's Twisted Wheel Club, and is credited as being instrumental in the development of the Motown Sound.

Rob Gretton, manager of New Order (the band formed from the remaining members of Joy Division after singer Ian Curtis's suicide) and Factory Records boss Tony Wilson opened Fac 51 the Haçienda on Whitworth Street West in 1982. It quickly became the focus of electronic music and the start of the Madchester sound. Combining acid house and the Ibiza party scene, the Haçienda can be thought of as a partial incubator for the Summer of Love in 1988. The club was also portrayed in the 2002 film 24 Hour Party People.

One of the oldest and most diverse venues is the Band on the Wall, a live music venue in the Northern Quarter district of the city. This venue was built around 1862 as the flagship pub of a local brewery; it was originally called the George & Dragon. It got its nickname in the late 1920s or early 1930s from the stage high on the back wall. In 1975 it was taken on by jazz musician Steve Morris and his business partner Frank Cusick, and renamed the Band on the Wall.

Research from TickX showed that Manchester has the most events per capita in the United Kingdom at 79 events per thousand people, 20 more than the next highest, Brighton.

== Venues ==
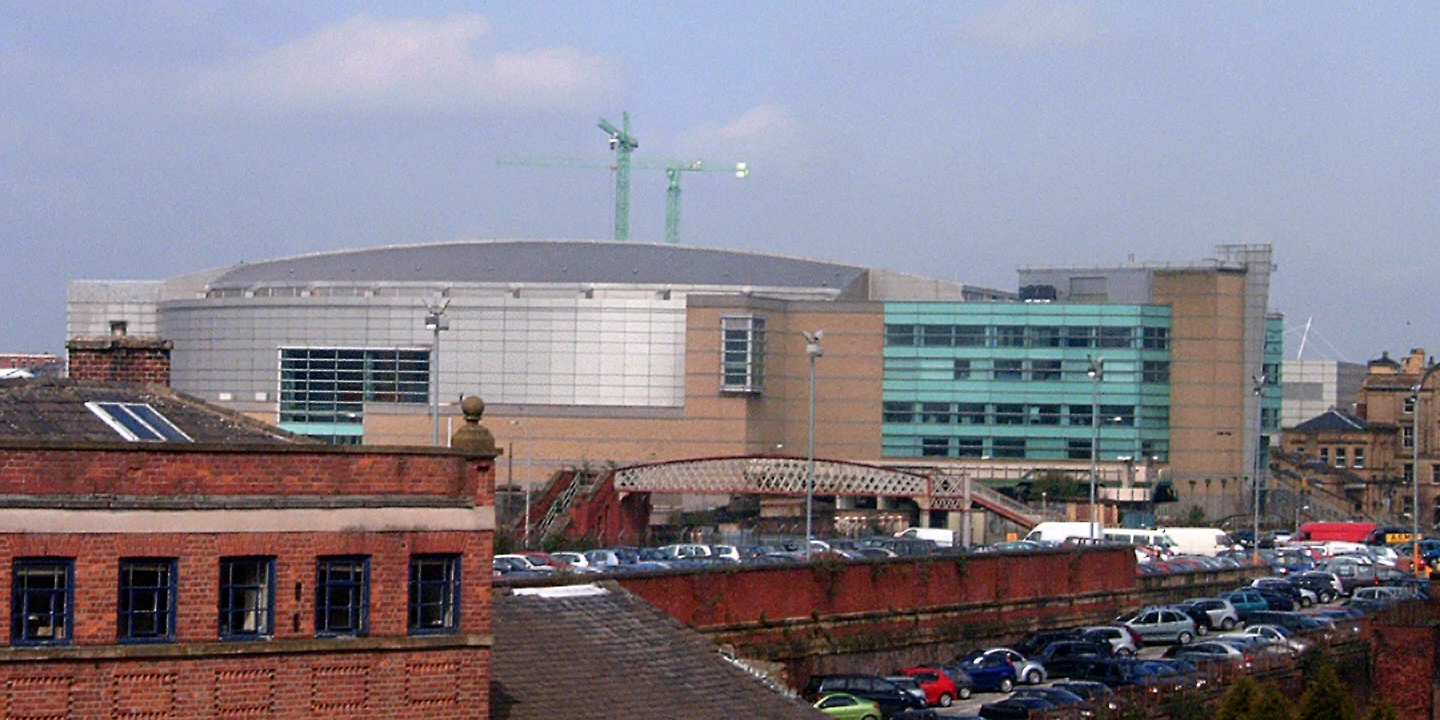
The Manchester Arena.

As well as many sporting venues Manchester has many venues for performances and conventions:

- City of Manchester Stadium - Home to Manchester City F.C., the stadium has a concert capacity of 60,000 - 2nd largest only after Wembley Stadium in London.
- Manchester Arena
- Co-Op Live - Europe's most capacious indoor arena.
- Manchester Central - Comprising two separate venues formerly known as the GMEX Centre and Manchester International Conference Centre (MICC) respectively.
- Bridgewater Hall
- Manchester Academy
- Manchester Apollo
- Old Trafford Cricket Ground
- The Factory

== LGBTQIA+ ==
Manchester has claimed to have the UK's largest gay population outside London. Gay Village, centred on the Canal Street area, is home to numerous shops, restaurants, bars and clubs. On the last weekend in August it hosts the Manchester Pride Festival (previously known as Mardi Gras and Gayfest).

Manchester's gay culture was brought to mainstream attention on television series Queer as Folk and Coronation Street, which are set in the Village. It is also the birthplace of several gay rights organisations including the Campaign for Homosexual Equality, Queer Youth Alliance, the Lesbian & Gay Foundation. Manchester has its own gay sports teams, Village Manchester FC (soccer), Northern Wave (swimming) and Village Spartans (Rugby) which take part in Manchester's annual Pride Games. In the 1990s Manchester City Council gave support to the establishment of a gay centre and employed four lesbians and gay men to help implement their equal opportunity policy. Their work continued in spite of Section 28 and the City Council actively supported the Mardi Gras and other gay events.

The year round gay and lesbian heritage trail exhibits Manchester's gay history. In 2003, Manchester played host city to the annual Europride festival. The Lesbian & Gay Foundation, Britain's biggest gay charity, is based on Richmond Street in the city centre. Manchester Metropolitan University has been named the most gay friendly university in the UK.

== See also ==
- Manchester International Festival
- Manchester Jazz Festival
- Writers from Manchester
