= Repertory theatre =

Theatre in which a resident company presents works from a specified repertoire

A repertory theatre, also called repertory, rep, true rep or stock, which are also called producing theatres, is a theatre in which a resident company presents works from a specified repertoire, usually in alternation or rotation.

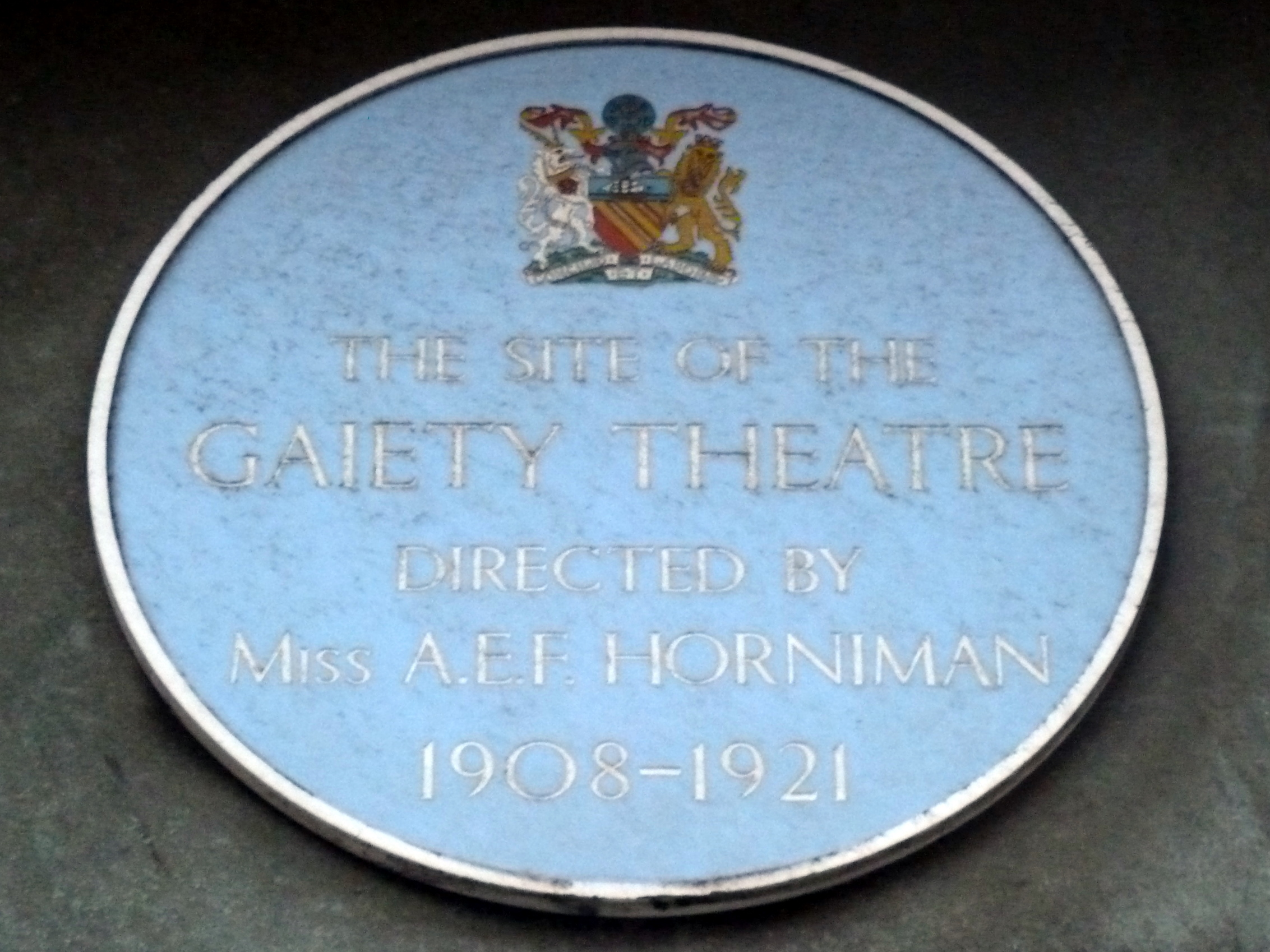
Blue plaque marking the site of the Gaiety Theatre

== United Kingdom ==
Annie Horniman founded the first modern repertory theatre in Manchester after withdrawing her support from the Abbey Theatre in Dublin. Horniman's Gaiety Theatre opened its first season in September 1908. The opening of the Gaiety was followed by the Citizens' Theatre in Glasgow, the Liverpool Repertory Theatre and the Birmingham Repertory Theatre. Previously, regional theatre relied on mostly London touring ensembles. During the time the theatre was being run by Annie Horniman, a wide variety of types of plays were produced. Horniman encouraged local writers who became known as the Manchester School of playwrights. They included Allan Monkhouse, Harold Brighouse—writer of Hobson's Choice—and Stanley Houghton, who wrote Hindle Wakes. Actors who performed at the Gaiety early in their careers included Sybil Thorndike and Basil Dean.

From the 1930s to the 1960s, two impresarios dominated the field of British rep, mostly in the North. They were Harry Hanson and his Court players, and Frank H. Fortescue's Famous Players, with the Arthur Brough Players in Folkestone in the South. When an actor joined one of their companies, it could mean "twice-nightly" shows, and a new play to learn every week. Actress Rosemary Harris has told of her 50 consecutive weeks of doing that at Bedford rep. However, this is no longer possible, owing to restrictions from British Equity, which came to mandate just eight shows a week, including perhaps two matinées.

The practice of repertory ("rep") is still seen in large cities. Actors now have the luxury of at least three weeks of rehearsal, however. Repertory can still be found in the UK in a variation of guises: in Sidmouth (12 plays), Wolverhampton (eight), and Burslem and Taunton (four each). The Sheringham Little Theatre produces an in-house repertory season each summer, running from June until September. Weekly repertory theatre is also produced by the Summer Theatre season at Frinton-on-Sea.

== Canada ==
Organizations in Canada include North America's largest classical repertory theatre company, the Stratford Festival, founded in 1953 primarily to present productions of William Shakespeare's plays. Canada also hosts North America's second largest repertory theatre company, the Shaw Festival, founded in 1962, which presents plays written by or set during the lifetime of Bernard Shaw, or that follow Shaw's ideal of socially provocative theatre. However, Canadian repertory companies follow a model that differs somewhat from the years-long rotation repertory system found in Europe. In Canada, productions often stay on the repertory for one season, running in repertory with other productions in the same year. The actors are not employed full time long term, but instead work on contracts usually maximum 8 months long.

The Vagabond Repertory Theatre Company was formed in March 2009 by artistic directors Nathaniel Fried and Ryan LaPlante, and currently resides and performs in Kingston, Ontario. It shuttered in 2019. The old English-style repertory theatres such as Ottawa's CRT (Canadian Repertory Theatre) and Toronto's Crest Theatre no longer exist—although they did have a version of summer theatre in smaller holiday districts, such as the "Straw Hat" players of Gravenhurst and Port Carling at Ontario's vacation Muskoka Lakes area.

State-subsidized theatres on continental Europe have been suggested as the origin of the repertoire tradition. One of the earliest examples of this system is the Moscow Art Theatre circa 1898. An even earlier example are the theatres of Germany. See the Deutsches Theater, a privately owned German theatre founded in 1883 to produce plays in rep. While variations appeared before, the modern repertory system did not become popular until the twentieth century.

== United States ==
In the United States, the repertory system has also found a base to compete with commercial theatre. Many summer stock theatre companies are repertory in nature. College students and young professionals making up much of the acting company are supported by guest stars or actors who are further along in their careers.

Repertory theatre with mostly changing casts and longer-running plays, perhaps better classed as "provincial" or "non-profit" theatre, has made a big comeback in cities such as Little Rock, AR, Washington, DC, Minneapolis, Indianapolis, Milwaukee, Cincinnati, Chicago, Los Angeles, Nashville, New York, Houston, Boston, San Francisco, San Diego, Buffalo, Kansas City, and Seattle. Festival theatre now provides actors with work in the summer. There are many ways to rehearse repertory theatre. The most prolific American repertory theatres are an example of that. Utah Shakespeare Festival rehearses two plays a day split between an eight-hour period. This is common. Some theatres only rehearse one play a day and add shows into rotation as the season progresses, like The American Shakespeare Center. They rehearse one play for a little over two weeks before it opens; then, they begin the next one. The length of rehearsal also varies. American Players Theatre has a six-week-long rehearsal period compared to Oregon Shakespeare Festival's eleven-week-long one.

America's oldest resident repertory theatre, Hedgerow Theatre, is located in Rose Valley, Pennsylvania. It was founded by actor Jasper Deeter in 1923. The present producing artistic director is actress and director Penelope Reed. Other notable repertory theatres include the Guthrie Theater, which was set up as a regional repertory theatre concept that is free from commercial constraints in the choice of repertoire. It is aligned in objectives to the repertory and resident theatre movement that emerged in the United States in the 1960s. This sought to establish an alternative and decentralized theatre network outside of New York, one which would have non-profit-making status and would be focused on the art of the theatre as well as the development of artists, craftsmen, and administrators. Publicly funded theatres that belong to this type have been receiving erratic support since the 1980s.

The Association of Producing Artists (APA) was one of the most successful repertory theatres in the United States, touring for four years and holding residencies in several cities before finally joining the Phoenix Theatre in New York City, where it was known for staging plays with modest prices. Currently, the American Repertory Theatre is considered one of the most distinguished repertory theatres in the United States. Since its foundation in 1979, it has earned several awards including a Pulitzer Prize (1982), a Tony Award (1986), and a Jujamcyn Award (1985).

== Eastern Europe ==
In Russia and much of Eastern Europe, repertory theatre is based on the idea that each company maintains a number of productions that are performed on a rotating basis. Each production's life span is determined by its success with the audience. However, many productions remain in repertory for years as this approach presents each piece a few times in a given season, not enough to exhaust the potential audience pool. After the fall of the Soviet regime and the substantial diminution of government subsidy, the repertory practice has required re-examination. Moscow Art Theatre and Lev Dodin's Maly Drama Theatre of St. Petersburg are the world's most notable practitioners of this approach.

Rotation Repertory system is still the most commonly used business model of live theatre in Eastern and Central Europe, specifically in countries such as Austria, Serbia, Croatia, Slovenia, Slovakia and Czech Republic.

In Germany, most publicly funded theatres and some private theatres (such as the Schaubühne Berlin) run on a repertory system. See German theatre system (page in German).

== Weekly rep ==
A combination company was a touring theater company which performed only one play. Unlike repertory companies, which performed multiple plays in rotation, combination companies used more elaborate and specialised scenery in their productions.

A similar term, "weekly rep," denotes a British movement started in the early 1900s that focused on shorter runs of a single new work, rather than having several plays ready to perform at any given time.

For weekly rep and for a typical three-act play, the actors' week would start on Tuesday, and go as follows:

- Tuesday: notes on previous night's opening of the current play from the director, then a sit-down read-through of the next week's play with some discussion by the director, on-the-feet blocking of the moves for Act I, with a few questions from the actors, followed by the second performance of the current play (which would also occupy every evening up to and including Saturday).
- Wednesday: run Act I of next week's play and start to block Act II, but break early because there would be a matinée of the current play.
- Thursday: finish blocking Act II of next week's play, run Act II and block Act III.
- Friday: run Act III, run through the entire play with no scripts in hand, and technicals – meaning lights and sound – to watch, and write down cues.
- Saturday: run through again, stop and go to test lighting and sound cues; costumes may be used if ready. Two shows today, including a matinée; the evening show closes the current play. After the last show, the set would be struck (taken down) by the crew - usually apprentices – and the stage manager.
- Sunday: for actors, an opportunity to brush up on lines and moves, and for private rehearsals. However, for the crew it would mean putting up the new sets, hanging and focusing lights, and setting sound equipment.
- Monday: in the morning, a run-through, usually without costumes (to save wear and tear), mainly for the technicals. In the afternoon: a "Full Perfect" dress rehearsal, maybe with a few friends seated in front to gauge reaction, then copious notes. In the evening, 8 o'clock opening night, followed by notes from the director, visits with friends from the audience and maybe a party nearby. The process would start all over again on Tuesday.

== Resident company ==
Today, repertory theatres employ a wide range of actors, who can play a variety of types.

Before the modern repertory system, acting ensembles were normally made up of the standard stock company and later the touring company. The stock company would usually consist of a leading man and lady, a character actor and actress, younger actors to play romantic roles, and the rest of the actors would be a variety of ages and body types. The acting ensemble was typically around twelve. This was most popular prior to the Restoration. Post Restoration and into the nineteenth century, stock companies remained, but they were joined and then replaced by traveling companies. These ensembles consisted of the stars and actors hired to play a very specific role as a single production toured around.

Examples of rep performers who went on to become well-known are John Gielgud, Ralph Richardson, Laurence Olivier, Rosemary Harris, Christopher Plummer, Harold Pinter, Peter O'Toole, Jeremy Brett, Geraldine McEwan, Vanessa Redgrave, Judi Dench, Ian McKellen, Michael Gambon, Imelda Staunton and Patrick Stewart. Dirk Bogarde wrote about his start at Amersham rep in 1939, and Michael Caine has recounted his time spent at Horsham rep in the early 1950s.

There are many noted resident companies or repertory companies, such as the Artists Repertory Theatre.

== See also ==
- Combination company
- Community theatre
- Fringe theatre
- Mercury Theatre
- Summer stock theatre
- Stagione
- Theatre festival
- Theatre (structure) (i.e. building)

== Footnotes ==
Murray, Stephen. Taking Our Amusements Seriously. LAP, 2010. ISBN 978-3-8383-7608-0.
