= Justin Moorhouse =

British actor, comedian, and DJ (born 1970)

- Moorhouse in 2026
- Born: 15 May 1970 (age 56); Ashton-under-Lyne, England
- Occupations: Comedian, actor

Justin Moorhouse (born 15 May 1970) is an English stand-up comedian, radio DJ and actor from Ashton-Under-Lyne. He appeared in Phoenix Nights, Looking for Eric and Guess The Attendance. Moorhouse has also appeared as a guest on the Dave TV series As Yet Untitled with Alan Davies.

== Career ==
Born in Ashton-under-Lyne, Moorhouse is the eldest of four children, and was raised in the nearby town of Hyde.

Moorhouse was a salesman for many years before contacting a comedy club, the Frog and Bucket in Oldham Street, Manchester and performing a stand-up comedy routine, aged 29. In 2002, he competed in a local comedy competition held at the Southern pub in Chorlton, winning the final held at the Comedy Store Manchester. Soon afterwards, he performed in a comedy tour, before getting the role of Young Kenny in Phoenix Nights. Although Young Kenny is a Manchester City supporter, Moorhouse himself supports their rivals, Manchester United.

Moorhouse appeared in the film Looking for Eric as "Spleen".

From 7 December 2010 to 22 January 2011, he starred in Harold Brighouse's play Zack at the Royal Exchange, Manchester. From August 2014 to September 2014, Moorhouse played Dean Upton in Coronation Street.

In 2014, Moorhouse voiced the "Vimtoad" in an advert campaign for Vimto.

In 2015 he became the resident compere of the Heatons' Comedy Evening, which took place at the Heatons' Sports Club, Stockport on the first Sunday of every month. Moorhouse also appeared at the Royal Exchange Theatre Manchester in 'One Man, Two Governors'

=== Television ===
In the 2010 series of Michael McIntyre's Comedy Roadshow, Justin appeared as one of the supporting acts. In the 2011–12 series of Celebrity Mastermind, he was one of the winners. His chosen specialist subject was Les Dawson. In 2013, he guest starred in Still Open All Hours. On 27 and 28 October 2016, he appeared in UKTV W channel's Celebrity Haunted Hotel Live broadcast from Elvey Farm Hotel near Pluckley in Kent, UK, supposedly the most haunted village in England. He was teamed up with friend and fellow Mancunian, actor John Thomson as they were pitted against fellow celebrity guests performing spooky challenges in the reality-based show leading up to Halloween. Paranormal-sceptic Moorhouse and roommate Thomson stayed one night in the hotel after completing their tasks. In 2026 Justin played builder and loan shark Eddie Day in "Fountain" Series 5, Episode 1, of The Madame Blanc Mysteries on Channel 5.

=== Radio ===
Justin presented various shows at Manchester commercial radio station, Key 103 until February 2013. These shows included weekday drive and afternoons and latterly Sunday mornings with Coronation Street star Jennie McAlpine.

He has written and appeared in his own BBC Radio 4 sitcom Everyone Quite Likes Justin. Elisabeth Mahoney, reviewing the comedy in The Guardian, said of the pilot episode "There's a satisfyingly high gag hit-rate for this new comedy about a radio presenter".

He is also a semi-regular guest on 7 Day Sunday and Fighting Talk, both broadcast on BBC Radio 5 Live. He also occasionally presents shows on BBC Radio Manchester, and was an occasional 'friend' on Colin Murray and Friends, which aired from 10 am to 1 pm, on weekdays on Talksport.

== Podcast ==
In October 2013, he began a weekly podcast called About 30 minutes, No more than 45. He chats with fellow comedians and gives an insight into his week.

Preceded by Martin Kelner	BBC Radio 5 Live; Fighting Talk Champion of Champions; 2013/14	Succeeded by Paul Sinha
