= Mona Limerick =

Irish actress (1882–1968)

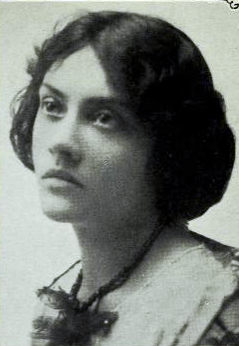
Mona Limerick, from a 1914 publication.

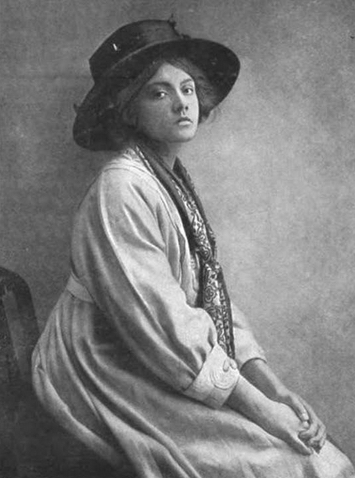
Mona Limerick, from a 1909 publication.

Mona Limerick (born Mary Charlotte Louise Gadney; 1882–1968) was an Irish stage actress. She was the wife of actor Ben Iden Payne.

== Early life ==
Mona Limerick was born to Irish parents, possibly in South America. In another version of her story, she mentioned being born in India and raised in Germany, as the daughter of Irish missionaries.

== Career ==
Limerick had her acting debut in 1902, in Bristol. She was a member of the Abbey Players in Dublin, and a member of Annie Horniman's repertory company of the Gaiety Theatre in Manchester. In 1909 George Bernard Shaw chose Limerick for the role of Hypatia in his play Misalliance, but she had to refuse the role to play Beatrice in her husband's production of Much Ado About Nothing in Manchester. Shaw wrote to her about his disappointment: "I solemnly curse Iden Payne. I curse Miss Horniman. I curse the Gaiety Theatre. I curse Manchester. I curse destiny. I lay a blight on every theatrical enterprise in England until you do your duty and come play for me." In 1910 she appeared in Shaw's The Dark Lady of the Sonnets, and toured in Shaw's Man and Superman.

Limerick had a reputation for being "strange, haunting, puzzling" in her stage persona. Caricaturist Max Beerbohm drew a severe figure of Limerick in 1909, and described her as having "a barbaric air, and yet an air of being over-civilized." Joseph Conrad described Limerick in a 1917 letter as having "a quality which gets home every time and if she may exasperate her audience I am certain she will never bore it or leave it indifferent."

Limerick and Ben Iden Payne left the Manchester troupe in 1911, and toured the United States in 1913. She starred in Cicely Hamilton's play Phyl and Harriet Monroe's play The Man-Eagle in Chicago in 1914. She also acted in Rabindranath Tagore's Chitra in Boston in 1915, and made plans to appear in vaudeville in The Woman in Red.

== Personal life ==
Mona Limerick married fellow actor Ben Iden Payne in 1906. They had three children, Sara (1907-1993) who became a dancer, Rosalind (1911-1990) who became an actress, and son Paget. Limerick and Payne divorced in 1950. Mona Limerick died in 1968, aged 86 years.
