= Independent Means =

Stage play written by Stanley Houghton

Independent Means is a stage play written by Stanley Houghton, a leading member of the Manchester School of dramatists.

The play was Houghton's first professional full-length play which was written in 1908. Its first title was The Unemployed, but this was changed to avoid confusion with a one-act play with a similar title. It was chosen by Annie Horniman to open the second season at the Gaiety Theatre, Manchester, on 30 August 1909. It was an immediate success and was chosen to open the next two seasons, and it was published in 1911. It was broadcast by Granada Television in 1960. Otherwise the play remained unknown until it was "discovered" in the British Library by Chris Honer, artistic director of the Library Theatre, Manchester. It was decided to produce the play at the Library Theatre in 2008 to celebrate the centenary of the Gaiety Theatre.

== Plot ==
The play is set in the fictional town of Salchester (an amalgam of Salford and Manchester) in the 1900s. John and Sidney Forsyth have returned early from their honeymoon to John’s home where his parents, Edgar and Mrs Forsyth are surprised to see them. Jane the maid prepares a room for them, and Samuel Ritchie, a family friend and owner of a business retailing cars, visits for dinner. Edgar is a rich man, living on his investments and spending much time with friends in the club. One of his major investments has not been doing well recently but the other has been making up for it. John has been to university but has no specials skills, other than messing about with motor cars, and expects to become an MP. His courtship with Sidney had been only for three months and during that time he had not discovered that her political opinions were very different from his; he is a Conservative; she is a left-wing suffragette. They argue, and she is determined to have a life of her own, despite John’s strong objections. A year later, Edgar’s other investment has failed and he is a ruined man. Ritchie offers to help, but is rebuffed and vows never to enter the house again. Jane announces that she has been left a bequest of £20,000 from an uncle in Australia, and leaves her job.

Three months later, despite Edgar’s desperate attempts to speculate, the house and its contents are up for sale. Jane appears, dressed in her finery. Edgar returns from the pub, drunk and argues with everyone. Ritchie calls in, says he has bought the house and offers Sidney a job as a shorthand typist, which she accepts. When John hears of this he forbids her to take up the job, but Sidney insists and she and John separate. Meanwhile, Edgar has collapsed and died. A further three months pass, Sidney is working for Ritchie and living in Jane’s house. John and his mother are in lodgings. John has been trying for months to get a job, without success. He goes to Ritchie, who gives him a job as a car salesman; then discovers that Sidney is also working there and is furious. Jane appears to buy a car. Sidney announces that she is pregnant; she and John are reconciled to return to live together and to both work for Ritchie.
