= The Winning Goal =

1920 film

- Directed by: G. B. Samuelson
- Written by: Harold Brighouse (play)
- Produced by: G. B. Samuelson
- Starring: Harold Walden; Maudie Dunham; Tom Reynolds; Haidee Wright
- Production company: G. B. Samuelson Productions
- Distributed by: General Film Distributors
- Release date: 1920
- Country: United Kingdom
- Language: English

The Winning Goal is a 1920 British silent sports film directed by G. B. Samuelson and starring Harold Walden, Maudie Dunham and Tom Reynolds. It was based on the play The Game by Harold Brighouse. It was set in Lancashire against a backdrop of the fictional association football team Blackton Rovers. Chelsea player Jack Cock appeared as himself in the film and 16-then international players featured as members of two fictional teams. Match footage was shot at Brentford's Griffin Park ground.

== Cast ==
- Harold Walden as Jack Metherill
- Maudie Dunham as Elsie Whitworth
- Tom Reynolds as Uncle Edmond
- Haidee Wright as Mrs. Whitworth
- Jack Cock as himself

== See also ==
- List of association football films
