= The Game (play) =

- Original language: English
- Written by: Harold Brighouse

Premiere
- Date: 1916
- Place: England

The Game is a play by Harold Brighouse, first published in 1920 as one of Three Lancashire Plays, the other two plays being The Northerners and Zack.

The play is centred on a fictional football team, Blackton Rovers, their star player Jack Metherell and the family of club owner Austin Whitworth.

In 1920 the play was adapted into a film The Winning Goal directed by G.B. Samuelson. Professional footballer Jack Cock appeared as himself in the film.

It was revived by Northern Broadsides in 2010 after a period of near oblivion. Barrie Rutter, the company's artistic director, failed to find a copy of the script in Britain. He finally found one in a Canadian university library. It is now available from Samuel French Ltd.
