= Ben Iden Payne =

English actor, director and teacher

Ben Iden Payne (5 September 1881 – 6 April 1976), also known as B. Iden Payne, was an English actor, director and teacher. Active in professional theatre for seventy years, he helped the first modern repertory theatre in the United Kingdom, was an early and effective advocate for Elizabethan staging of Shakespeare plays, and served as an inspiration for Shakespeare Companies and university theatre programmes throughout North America and the British Isles. A theatre at the University of Texas is named after him, as well as annual theatre awards presented in Austin, Texas.

== Early life ==
Born on 5 September 1881, in Newcastle upon Tyne, he was raised and educated in Manchester. He was the youngest of four children. His father, a Unitarian minister, died at age 52, when Payne was eleven years old. As a young child, the first Shakespeare play he saw was a touring production of Twelfth Night. During his second year at the Manchester Grammar School he appeared in his first Shakespearean role, Bassanio in The Merchant of Venice.

== Modified Elizabethan staging theory ==
Payne called his method "modified Elizabethan staging". It was inspired by the founder of the Elizabethan Stage Society, William Poel, and developed during Payne's time in Pittsburgh. He drew on actual stages from the Elizabethan period. An audience member, said Payne, should feel that "he was sharing in the action—not looking at something outside himself". This could be achieved by creating a more intimate space, where the audience was not separated from the actors by "the proscenium arch, footlights, or orchestra pits". Additionally, audience members were, according to this method, better able to focus in on the actors and the play itself when they were not distracted by "falling curtains, blackouts, planned pauses for resetting scenery … or any other forced interruption" of the action of the play.

== First professional work ==
While still in school, he started his career as a walk-on actor in 1899. Upon being interviewed by Frank Benson, he was introduced to Mrs Benson; he was astonished to see she was the actress who played Viola in the traveling production of Twelfth Night he had seen as a child. After a four-week trial engagement with Benson, Payne spent a season touring Britain with a much smaller company. He returned to Benson the next year, but this engagement was cut short when a fire at the Theatre Royal in Newcastle upon Tyne destroyed the company's stock of scenery and costumes. Payne signed on with the touring troupe of Carlyon and Charlton, a "fit-up" company that travelled with their own stage proscenium, stage curtains, lighting and scenery. In 1902 he returned to Benson, where he worked both as an actor and an assistant stage manager, his first non-acting theatrical experience. He toured with Benson and several other companies the next several years, performing Shakespeare in Jamaica with the Benson Company, participating in the first production (staged by the Arthur Hare Company) of The Importance of Being Earnest performed after the trial and imprisonment of Oscar Wilde. During that period, he married the actress Mona Limerick; they had three children.

== Stage director at the Abbey Theatre ==
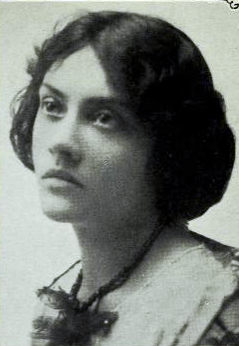
Payne's wife, Mona Limerick

As the tour with McIntosh petered out, Payne auditioned for director and producer Harley Granville-Barker. Granville-Barker referred him to Cyril Keightley, who took him on tour to Ireland. Shortly thereafter, and unexpectedly, Payne was approached by William Butler Yeats, one of the Directors of the Abbey Theatre, Dublin. Unknown to Payne, Granville-Barker had recommended him for the position; equally unknown to him at the time, the English financial patron of the Abbey, Annie Horniman, insisted on an English professional stage manager as a condition for a three-year subsidy she was making to the theatre.

Payne met Yeats and the other two directors of the Abbey, Lady Gregory and J. M. Synge, for an interview the weekend that Synge's masterpiece, The Playboy of the Western World, opened. Payne was in the first row of the audience when the famous "Playboy" riots broke out in the house, with audience members breaking out in a pandemonium of shouting during the second half, over the alleged scandalous content of the play.

Payne was engaged as stage director of the Abbey Theatre, but with strict instructions that he was not to participate in the production of Irish folk plays. Payne was not aware at the time that his employment was made at the insistence of Horniman, nor that Lady Gregory and Synge were opposed to bringing in a British play director to the Irish National Theatre. The engagement lasted only a few months; after taking the company on a British tour from Glasgow, Scotland, to London, Payne resigned his position. He maintained a friendship with Yeats.

== Manchester Repertory Company ==
The day after resigning his position with the Abbey, he received a note from Horniman, the Abbey patron. She was unhappy with her relationship with the Irish National Theatre (the unhappiness was mutual) and she wanted to sponsor a new theatrical venture, under Payne's direction. Payne proposed establishing a repertory company in Manchester, a major provincial city in England and Payne's boyhood home. With Horniman's funding he established the Manchester Repertory Company, the first true repertory company in theatre in England. He directed many of the early plays of Bernard Shaw and John Galsworthy.

In 1907, Payne used William Poel to direct Measure for Measure, by William Shakespeare, with the Manchester Repertory Company. Poel was an early-twentieth-century innovative advocate of producing Shakespeare plays as written, without the heavy scenery and butchered text of grand nineteenth-century productions by the likes of Henry Irving. Poel's production at Manchester Repertory may have been his best, as Payne had cast it with talented, professional actors, and not the amateurs Poel usually worked with.

The next year, Payne produced Shakespeare's Much Ado About Nothing as a Christmas play at Manchester. To keep the pace of the play flowing, without long interruptions during scene changes, he staged played connecting scenes in front of a neutral curtain drawn across the proscenium. This was an early experiment in staging Shakespeare plays as continuous action, as was the style at the Globe Theatre when the plays were first written and produced. Payne resigned as director of Manchester Repertory in 1911, both for personal reasons (his wife, Mona Limerick, did not get along with Horniman) and because he believed new management could produce more popular plays that might stem the red ink of the operation.

== Going to America ==
In 1913 Payne was invited to the United States to organise a season of modern plays for the Chicago Theatre Society, a pioneering community theatre. He had been referred to that company by Horniman. The Society produced a repertory season of plays by Shaw and Galsworthy, as well as a conventionally staged production of Measure for Measure. In February 1914, he produced a series of plays in Indianapolis for the Drama League of America. The next year he directed a little theatre company in Philadelphia.

== Carnegie Tech ==
While in Chicago, Kenneth Sawyer Goodman, the namesake of the Goodman Theatre, introduced Payne to Thomas Wood Stevens Arthur Hamerschlag. Hamerschlag was the first President of Carnegie Institute of Technology (now Carnegie Mellon University) and Stevens was the first chairman of the department of drama there, the first professional drama department in a university. Payne directed You Never Can Tell, by Shaw during the department's first year of operation. Payne was associated with the school of drama at Carnegie Tech from 1914, and two years later he first directed the annual Shakespeare play, to 1950, excepting the Stratford years of 1935–1943. While at Carnegie Tech he tried out Poel's concept of Shakespeare productions performed on English Renaissance theatre stages, without elaborate scenery, by staging an annual Elizabethan production there. At Carnegie they had first used elaborate scenery for Shakespeare plays, but Payne discovered that the more they simplified the scenery the better it was for the production and the more immediate was the appeal to the audience.

In 1925 Stevens departed Carnegie to manage the newly created Goodman Theatre in Chicago, and Payne succeeded him as chairman of the drama department. During his first year in the chair in 1925, he directed a production of Shakespeare's Hamlet fully using the staging technique he came to describe as "modified Elizabethan staging". He left the chair of the Department in 1928, but returned every year until 1951 (except for the years at Stratford), directing 58 plays at Carnegie between 1914 and 1951, 26 of them by Shakespeare.

== Broadway career ==
In 1915, Payne produced the first staging of Hobson's Choice by Harold Brighouse for The Shubert Organization. In 1916 he directed John Barrymore in his first success in a serious role, in the American premiere of Justice by John Galsworthy. According to Angus L. Bowmer, founder of the Oregon Shakespeare Festival, a financial backer demanded that Barrymore be replaced, fearing a disastrous drinking binge. Payne replied, in effect, that if they replaced Barrymore they would have to find a new director. Barrymore stayed and the performance launched his career. Justice had been produced by John D. Williams, press agent for Charles Frohman. In 1917, Payne accepted a position as a stage director of the Charles Frohman Company, a leading American producing organisation.

Payne would split his time between directing professionally in New York and directing students at the school of drama at Carnegie Tech, sometimes preferring the attitude and commitment of his "apprentice actors" in Pittsburgh to his professional actors on Broadway. Payne was unhappy with the work at Frohman, with its emphasis on type casting, and a star system where engaging a celebrity actor (who cared more about their own performance than the good of the play as a whole) was the main concern, and he left in 1923. He returned to Broadway in 1943 to direct several plays for the Theatre Guild of New York.

== Inspiration on other theatres ==
As a guest director at the University of Washington in the summer of 1930 he staged Shakespeare's Cymbeline and Love's Labour's Lost on an Elizabethan style, on a temporary thrust stage. The productions inspired a young graduate student, Angus L. Bowmer, who acted in and staged managed the productions. Bowmer went on to incorporate these staging concepts when he founded the Oregon Shakespeare Festival five years later. Payne directed Shakespeare's Cymbeline at the Oregon Shakespeare Festival in 1956, and A Midsummer Night's Dream in 1961.

In 1934 Payne and Thomas Woods Stevens edited and produced several short (one hour) productions of Shakespeare plays that were presented during the second year of the Chicago World's Fair (Century of Progress) at a crude reconstruction of Shakespeare's Globe Theatre. This recreation of the Globe, and these short Shakespeare plays, inspired the 1935 California Pacific International Exposition to build a recreation of the Globe there as well, designed by Stevens, and stage their short 50 minute Shakespeare plays The exhibition was such a success that the recreated Globe in San Diego was preserved following the exposition, and became the home of the Old Globe Theatre. Payne returned to the Old Globe in San Diego in 1949 to direct its first Summer Shakespeare Festival, a production of Twelfth Night in 1949, and directed there several summers until 1964.

== Stratford Festival ==
Payne returned to England from 1935 to 1943 to direct the Stratford Memorial Theatre Festival in Stratford-upon-Avon, England. Having experimented with quasi-Elizabethan at Carnegie Tech, he was forced by the tradition of the organisation's management and the restrictions of the huge old Memorial Theatre to use traditional proscenium techniques,. The experience was unhappy for Payne, and he departed in 1943. He directed no fewer than thirty seven productions at Stratford.

== Later academic career and the University of Texas ==
Payne produced Shakespeare plays as a guest professor at the University of Washington in 1943 and 1946, the University of Iowa in 1943, the University of Missouri in 1948, the University of Colorado in 1953, the University of Michigan in 1954, San Diego State University 1949–52, Allan Hancock College, California in 1968, and the Banff School of Fine Arts, Banff, Alberta, Canada 1959–1963. Payne went to the University of Texas at Austin in 1946 and spent the rest of his career as an academic there. He served as Chairman of the Department of Drama 1947–1947 and again 1951–52. He directed 29 plays at Texas, 24 by Shakespeare, and retired as Professor Emeritus of Drama in May 1973. He directed his last production at Texas in 1968, Shakespeare's The Tempest.

The B. Iden Payne Awards, awarded to actors, directors, and designers for outstanding contributions to theatre in Austin, Texas, are named in his honour. In 1976, one of the three theatres on campus (now seven theatres) at the University of Texas in Austin was named after him.
