= That Day We Sang =

2014 British television film

- DVD cover
- Music: Victoria Wood
- Lyrics: Victoria Wood
- Book: Victoria Wood
- Basis: Reunion of the 1929 recording of "Nymphs and Shepherds" by The Manchester Children's Choir
- Premiere: 6 July 2011: Manchester Opera House
- Productions: 2011 Manchester International Festival; 2013 Manchester Royal Exchange; 2014 television film

That Day We Sang is a British musical written and composed by Victoria Wood. It is based on a true story of the reunion of a famous recording of "Nymphs and Shepherds" in 1929 by The Manchester Children's Choir.

== 2011 Manchester International Festival ==
The play was commissioned for the Manchester International Festival, and was first performed at the Manchester Opera House in July 2011, under the direction of Victoria Wood, for just ten performances. The cast was accompanied by a choir and the Hallé Youth Orchestra.

- Vincent Franklin as Tubby
- Jenna Russell as Enid
- Lorraine Bruce as Dorothy/Pauline
- Raif Clarke as Young Jimmy
- Alison Pargeter as Gertrude Riall

== 2013 Manchester Royal Exchange Cast ==
A rewritten production opened at the Royal Exchange Theatre for Christmas 2013, directed by Sarah Frankcom.

- Dean Andrews as Tubby
- Anna Francolini as Enid
- Kelly Price as Gertrude Riall

== 2014 television film ==
Provisionally entitled Tubby and Enid, filming of a television adaption began on 6 January 2014 using locations in Liverpool, Manchester and Huddersfield Town Hall. It was produced by Paul Frift with executive producers Hilary Bevan Jones and Matthew Read and eventually broadcast under the original name on 26 December 2014. Seen by 2.57 million viewers, it was the eighth most watched programme on BBC Two that week. It was Wood's last major work before her death in April 2016.

- Imelda Staunton as Enid
- Michael Ball as Tubby (Jimmy)
- Sophie Thompson as Dorothy
- Conleth Hill as Frank
- Harvey Chaisty as Young Jimmy (Tubby)
- Dorothy Atkinson as Gertrude Riall
- Daniel Rigby as Mr. Kirkby
- Jessica Gunning as Pauline
- Lyndsey Marshal as Sal
- Charles De'Ath as Lionel
- Malcolm Sinclair as Sir Hamilton Harty
- Ian Lavender as Commissionaire/Older Mr. Kirkby
- Chris Jordan as The Director
- Michael Jibson as Man with gramophone

An hour-long documentary That Musical We Made, about the making of the telefilm, was broadcast the following day and featured archive clips from the original reunion documentary about the real-life choristers which Wood first viewed in her twenties.

Michael Ball played "Nymphs and Shepherds" composer Henry Purcell in the 1995 film England, My England.
