= Zack (play) =

- Original language: English
- Written by: Harold Brighouse

Premiere
- Date: 1920
- Place: England

Zack is a 1920 play by British playwright Harold Brighouse.

It was one of several of Brighouse's plays performed by the Manchester's Gaiety Theatre.

== Other performances ==
- In 1976 Eric Thompson directed a production at the Royal Exchange, Manchester with Patricia Routledge as Mrs Manning, Lindsay Duncan as Sally Teale and Trevor Peacock as Zachariah Manning.

In 1988 Euan Smith directed "Zack" at the Watermill Theare, Newbury with Yvonne Bellamy as Mrs Manning, Alan Hendrick as Paul, Val Pelka as Zack, Helen Patrick as Virginia, Robin Brunskill as Martha Wrigley, and Isobel Rowley as Sally.
