= Nymphs and Shepherds =

17th century song by Henry Purcell

"Nymphs and Shepherds" is a song by the English composer Henry Purcell, from the play The Libertine by Thomas Shadwell. When the play was first performed, in 1675, the accompanying music was by William Turner. Purcell's music was first used in either 1692 or 1695; the musicologist Ian Spink has concluded that the latter year is the more probable, although the earlier date is often cited.

== Textual history ==
The Libertine is a version of the Don Juan legend. The song "Nymphs and shepherds, come away" occurs in a pastoral interlude at the beginning of Act IV, after an orchestral introduction – a "Symphony of Rustick Musick". In the nineteenth century it became a popular concert piece, generally for soprano voice, and a second stanza, by William Hayman Cummings, was added to Shadwell's original verse.

Nymphs and shepherds, come away,
In this grove let's sport and play;
For this is Flora's holiday,
Sacred to ease and happy love,
To music, to dancing and to poetry.
Your flocks may now securely rest
While you express your jollity!
Nymphs and shepherds, come away.

Nymphs and shepherds, pipe and play,
Tune a song, a festal lay;
For this is Flora's holiday,
Lightly we tread o'er all the ground,
With music, with dancing and with poetry.
Then trip we round with merry sound,
And pass the day in jollity!
Nymphs and shepherds, come away.

In or around 1765 a new version was published as "sung by Miss Brent, at Ranelagh, and by Mrs Vincent, at Vaux-Hall Gardens," and set by Thomas Arne:

Nymphs and shepherds, come away,
Wanton in the sweets of May,
Trip it o'er the flow'ry lawn,
Lighter than the bounding fawn,
Frolick buxom, blyth and gay,
Nymphs and shepherds, come away.

== Manchester Children's Choir and Hallé Orchestra ==
The song was made famous when in June 1929, a choir of 250 schoolchildren from 52 local schools was recorded singing it in the Free Trade Hall, accompanied by the Hallé Orchestra under the direction of Sir Hamilton Harty. The city's education department had decided that children with no musical training should have a chance to perform. The Manchester Children's Choir was therefore formed in 1925 by Walter Carroll, Music Advisor to Manchester Education Committee, from elementary schools in the area. Grammar school pupils were assumed to have no time to spare for non-academic endeavours such as this, which required two evenings a week rehearsal throughout the whole academic year. The choir existed from 1925 to 1939 and gave concerts, usually in local town halls, during Civic Week. The concerts with the Halle lasted from 1929 until Walter Carroll's retirement in 1935. At the time of the recording 60 boys and 190 girls from Greater Manchester schools took part. They were trained by Carroll's assistant, Gertrude Riall, who put phonetic spellings such as "darnce" on a board to ensure words such as "dance" were not sung with the local accent.

The famous recording was made on the third take and more than a million copies were sold on the Columbia label. The B-side of the recording was the "Dance Duet" from Hansel and Gretel. It was a frequent radio request for many years. The record was awarded a Gold Disc by EMI in 1989.

After leaving the choir, some members stayed in touch. They reunited on several occasions such as in 1974 to celebrate the golden jubilee of the choir's formation and in 1989. A musical was written by Victoria Wood for the Manchester International Festival in 2011, called That Day We Sang based on a reunion in 1969. An expanded version of the musical was broadcast on television by the BBC on 26 December 2014. It starred Imelda Staunton and Michael Ball, who had played the composer Purcell in England, My England (1995).
