= Allan Monkhouse =

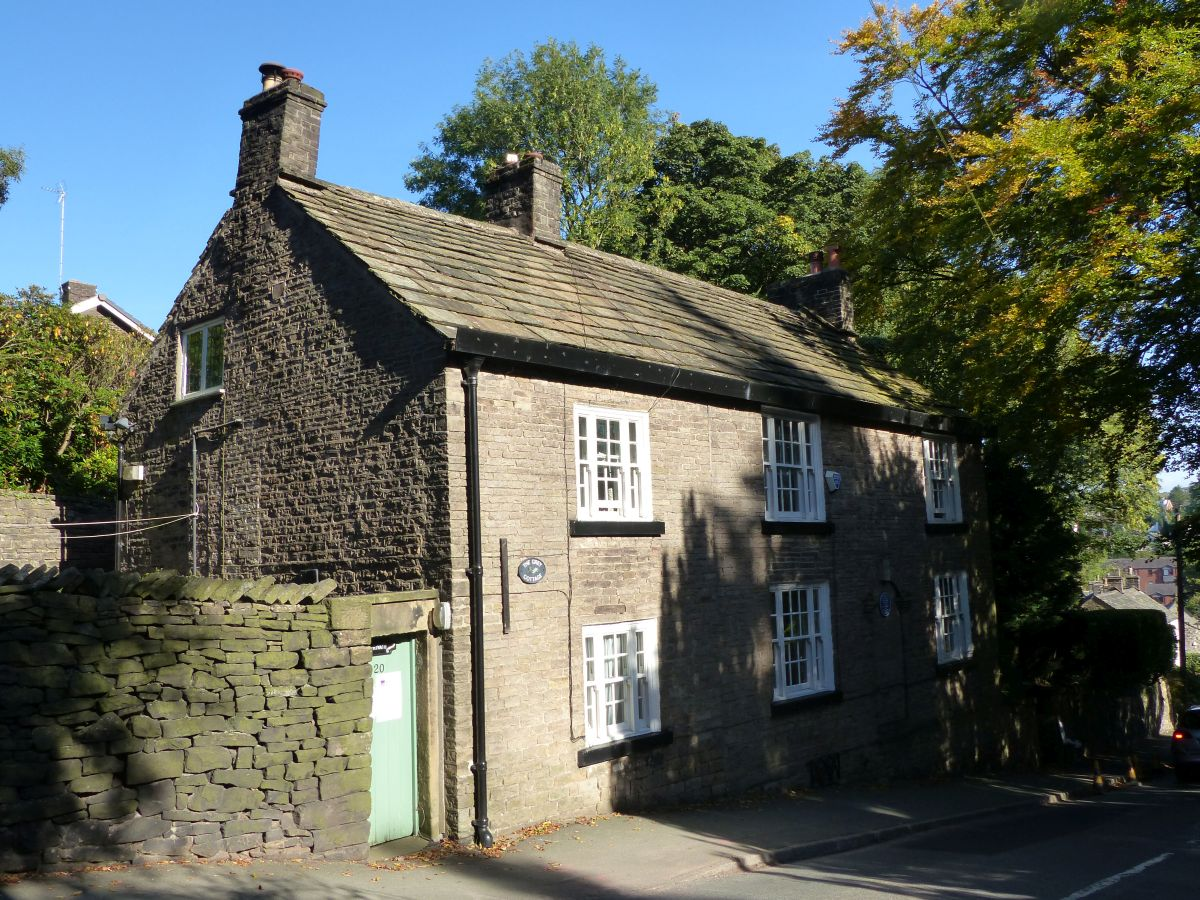
The Grey Cottage, Disley, where Monkhouse lived from 1893 to 1902

Allan Noble Monkhouse (7 May 1858 – 10 January 1936) was an English playwright, critic, essayist and novelist.

He was born in Barnard Castle, County Durham. He worked in the cotton trade, in Manchester, and settled in Disley, Cheshire. From 1902 to 1932 he worked on The Manchester Guardian, writing also for the New Statesman.

As literary editor, in fact if not in formal title, at the Guardian, Monkhouse helped to launch the career of James Agate by publishing his open letters from France during the First World War. Agate appears in Monkhouse's play Nothing Like Leather barely disguised as the theatre critic "Topaz".

He began to write drama for the Gaiety Theatre, Manchester, shortly after it was opened by Annie Horniman, along with Stanley Houghton and Harold Brighouse, forming a school of realist dramatists independent of the London stage, who were known as the Manchester School.

== Works ==
=== Novels ===
- A Deliverance (1898) novel
- Love in a Life (1903) novel
- Dying Fires (1912) novel
- Men & Ghosts (1918) novel
- True Love (1920) novel
- My Daughter Helen (1922) novel
- Marmaduke (1924) novel
- Suburb (1925) novel
- Alfred the Great (1927) novel
- Farewell Manchester (1931) novel

=== Plays ===
- Reaping the Whirlwind (1908) play
- The Choice (1910) play
- Mary Broome: A Comedy in Four Acts (1912)
- Nothing Like Leather (1913) play
- Four Tragedies (1913)
- The Education of Mr. Surrage: A Comedy in Four Acts (1913)
- Night Watches: A Comedy in One Act (1916)
- The Conquering Hero (1923) play
- First Blood: A Play in Four Acts (1924)
- Sons And Fathers: A Play in Four Acts (1925)
- The Rag (1928) play
- Paul Felice: A Play in Four Acts (1930)
- The Grand Cham's Diamond (1932) play
- Cecilia: A Play in Four Acts (1932)

=== Essays ===
- Books & Plays (1894) essays
- Essays of To-Day and Yesterday (1925)
