= Annie Horniman =

English theatre matron (1860–1937)

Annie Elizabeth Fredericka Horniman
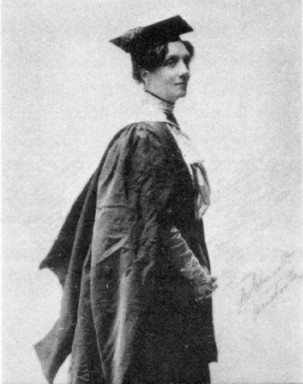
- Annie Horniman
- Born: 3 October 1860; Surrey Mount, Forest Hill, London, England
- Died: 6 August 1937 (aged 76); Shere, Surrey, England
- Education: Slade School of Fine Art
- Occupations: Theatre patron, manager
- Known for: Establishing the Abbey Theatre in Dublin, Founding the first regional repertory theatre in Manchester
- Parents: Frederick John Horniman (father); Rebekah née Emslie (mother)
- Awards: Member of the Order of the Companions of Honour (1933)

Annie Elizabeth Fredericka Horniman CH (3 October 1860 – 6 August 1937) was an English theatre matron and manager. She established the Abbey Theatre in Dublin and founded the first regional repertory theatre company in Britain at the Gaiety Theatre in Manchester. She encouraged the work of new writers and playwrights, including W. B. Yeats, George Bernard Shaw and members of what became known as the Manchester School of dramatists.

== Early life ==
Annie Horniman was born at Surrey Mount, Forest Hill, London, in 1860, the elder child of Frederick John Horniman and his first wife Rebekah née Emslie. Her father was a tea merchant and the founder of the Horniman Museum; her grandfather was John Horniman who founded the family tea business of Horniman and Company. Annie and her younger brother Emslie were educated privately at their home. Her father was opposed to the theatre, which he considered sinful, but their German governess took Annie and Emslie secretly to a performance of The Merchant of Venice at The Crystal Palace when Annie was aged 14.

Annie's father allowed her to enter the Slade School of Fine Art in 1882. Here she discovered that her talent in art was limited but she developed other interests, particularly in the theatre and opera. She took great pleasure in Wagner's Ring cycle and in Ibsen's plays. She cycled in London and twice over the Alps, smoked in public and explored alternative religions. The "lonely rich girl" had become "an independent-minded woman". In 1890 she joined the occult society the Hermetic Order of the Golden Dawn, where she remained a member until disagreements with its leaders led to her resignation in 1903. During this time she met and became a friend of W. B. Yeats, acting as his amanuensis for some years. Their friendship endured: Frank O'Connor recalled that on the day Yeats heard of her death, he spent the entire evening speaking of his memories of her.

== Theatre founder and manager ==
Annie's first venture into the theatre was in 1894 and was made possible by a legacy from her grandfather. She anonymously supported her friend Florence Farr in a season of new plays at the Avenue Theatre, London. This included a new play by Yeats, The Land of Heart's Desire, and the première of George Bernard Shaw's play Arms and the Man. In 1903 Yeats persuaded her to go to Dublin to back productions by the Irish National Theatre Society. Here she discovered her skill as a theatre administrator. She bought a property and developed it into the Abbey Theatre, which opened in December 1904. Although she moved back to live in England she continued to support the theatre financially until 1910. Meanwhile, in Manchester she had purchased and renovated the Gaiety Theatre in 1908 and developed it into the first regional repertory theatre in Britain.

At the Gaiety she appointed Ben Iden Payne as the director and employed actors on 40-week contracts, alternating their work between large and small parts. The plays produced included classics such as Euripides and Shakespeare, and she introduced works by contemporary playwrights such as Ibsen and Shaw. She also encouraged local writers who formed what was known as the Manchester School of dramatists, the leading members of which were Harold Brighouse, Stanley Houghton and Allan Monkhouse. The Gaiety company undertook tours of America and Canada in 1912 and 1913. Annie became a well-known public figure in Manchester, lecturing on subjects which included women's suffrage and her views about the theatre. In 1910 she was awarded the honorary degree of MA by Manchester University. During the First World War the Gaiety continued to stage plays but financial difficulties led to the disbandment of the permanent company in 1917, following which productions in the theatre were by visiting companies. In 1921 Annie sold the theatre to a cinema company.

As a result of her tea connection, she was known as "Hornibags". She held court at the Midland Hotel, wearing exotic clothing and openly smoking cigarettes, which was considered scandalous at the time. She introduced Manchester to what was called at the time "the play of ideas". The theatre critic James Agate noted that Horniman's high-minded theatrical ventures had "an air of gloomy strenuousness" about them.

== Later life ==
Annie moved to London where she kept a flat in Portman Square. In 1933 she was made a Member of the Order of the Companions of Honour. She died in 1937 at her home in Shere, Surrey. Her estate amounted to a little over £50,000. The Annie Horniman Papers are held in the John Rylands Library at the University of Manchester.
