= Manchester School (writers) =

The "Manchester School" was a number of playwrights from Manchester, England, who were active in the early 20th century. The leading figures in the group were Harold Brighouse, Stanley Houghton and Allan Monkhouse. They were championed by Annie Horniman, owner of the Gaiety Theatre, Manchester.
