= Gaiety Theatre, Manchester =

Former theatre in Manchester, England

Coordinates: 53°28′41″N 2°14′46″W

Gaiety Theatre
- Comedy Theatre (until 1908)
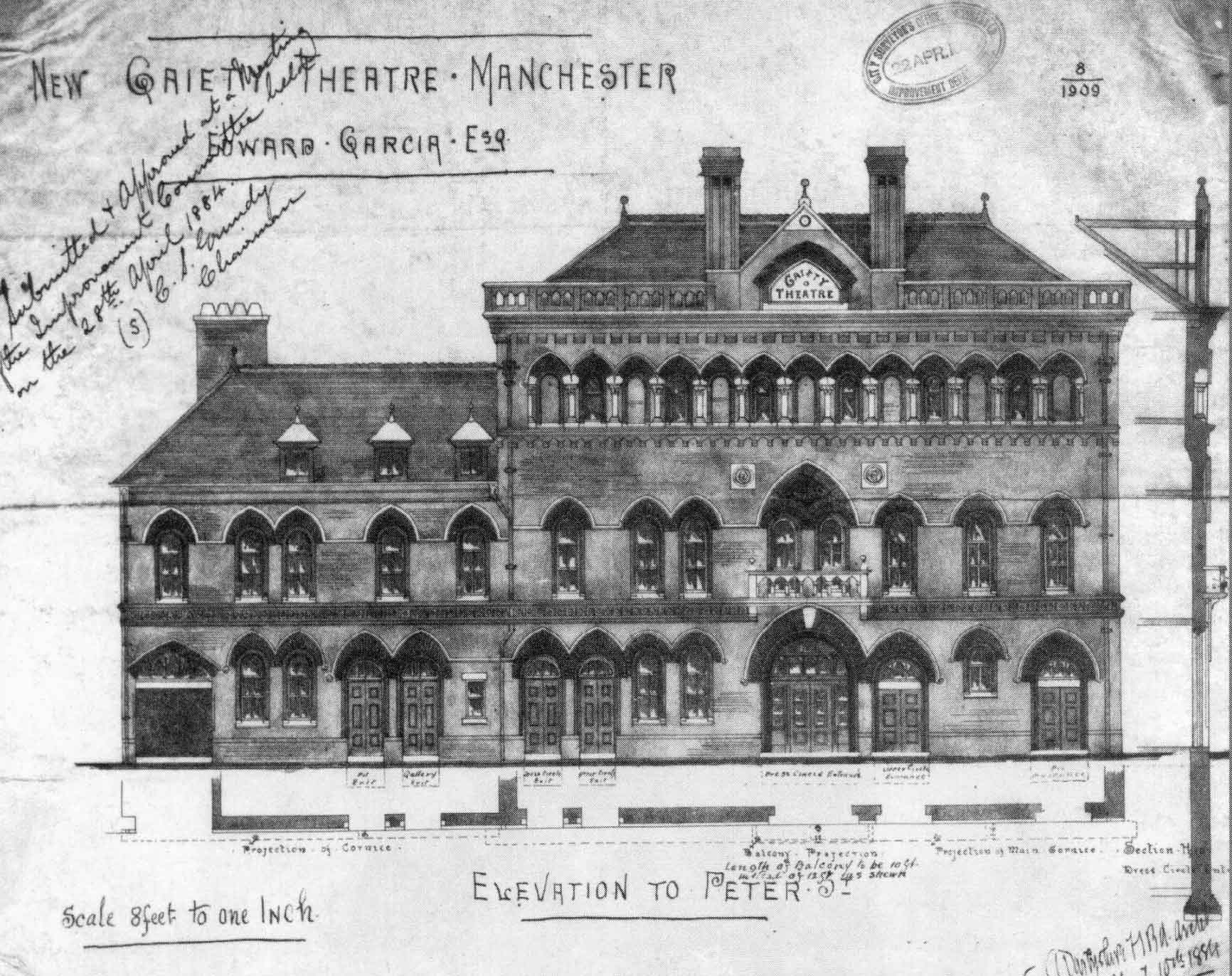
- Architect's drawing of the proposed theatre
- Interactive map of Gaiety Theatre
- Address: Peter Street; Manchester; England
- Owner: United Theatres Co. Ltd. Annie Horniman; Samuel Fitton & Associates
- Capacity: 2,500 (later 1,300, then 1,029)
- Type: Repertory

Construction
- Opened: 1884
- Closed: 1957
- Demolished: 1959
- Rebuilt: 1908
- Years active: 1884–1922, 1945–47
- Architects: Alfred Darbyshire; Frank Matcham (rebuilding)

The Gaiety Theatre, Manchester was a theatre in Manchester, England. It opened in 1884 and was demolished in 1959. It replaced a previous Gaiety Theatre on the site that had been destroyed by fire.

The new theatre was designed by Alfred Darbyshire for United Theatres Co. Ltd. and built on a plot of land near to the corner of Peter Street and Mount Street. It opened as the Comedy Theatre in 1884. On 9 November 1908, it was bought by Annie Horniman for £25,000 and reconstructed to plans by Frank Matcham, reducing its capacity from 2,500 to 1,300. The theatre reopened as the Gaiety Theatre in 1912. It was Britain's first regional repertory theatre. In 1920 the theatre was taken over by Samuel Fitton & Associates but closed in 1922. It was in use again between 1945 and 1947 but was demolished in 1959.

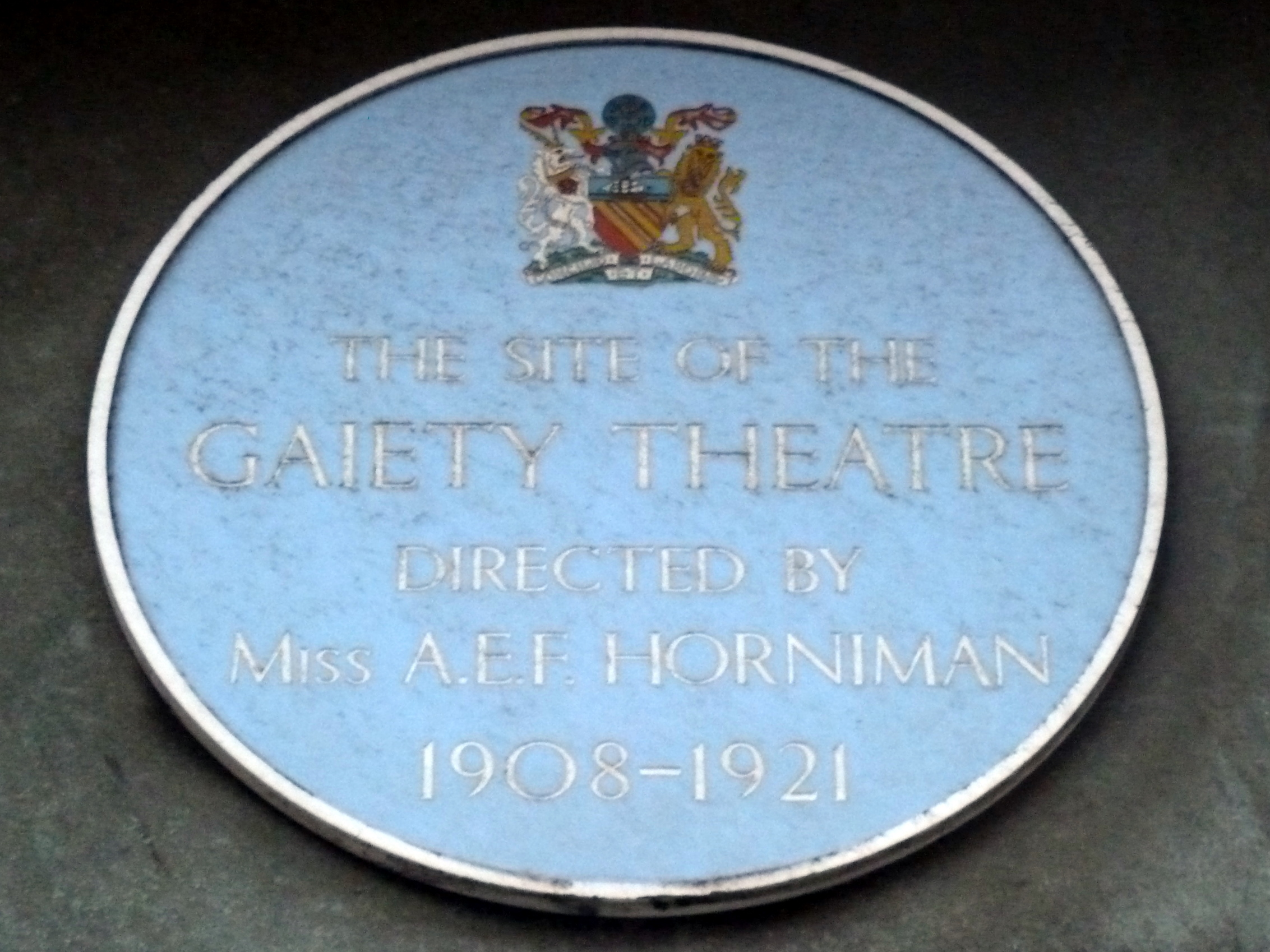
Blue Plaque marking the site of the theatre.

During the time the theatre was being run by Annie Horniman, a wide variety of types of plays was produced. Anne Horniman also encouraged local writers, who became known as the Manchester School of playwrights. They included Allan Monkhouse, Harold Brighouse, writer of Hobson's Choice, and Stanley Houghton, who wrote Hindle Wakes. Actors who performed at the Gaiety early in their careers include Sybil Thorndike and Basil Dean.

In 2008 Annie Horniman's centenary was celebrated by a performance of Houghton's play Independent Means, which had been recently "rediscovered" in the British Library by Chris Honer, the theatre's artistic director.
