= Harold Brighouse =

English playwright and author (1882–1958)

- Born: 26 July 1882; Eccles, Lancashire, England
- Died: 25 July 1958 (aged 75); London, England
- Occupations: Playwright, author
- Spouse: Emily Lynes
- Writing career
- Genre: Manchester School

Harold Brighouse (26 July 1882 – 25 July 1958) was an English playwright and author whose best known play is Hobson's Choice. He was a prominent member, together with Allan Monkhouse and Stanley Houghton, of a group known as the Manchester School of dramatists.

== Early life ==
Harold Brighouse was born in Eccles, Lancashire, the eldest child of John Southworth Brighouse, a manager for a cotton-spinning business, and Charlotte Amelia née Harrison, a headmistress. Harold attended a local school, then won a scholarship to Manchester Grammar School. He quit school aged 17 and started work as a textile buyer in a shipping merchant's office. In 1902 he went to London to establish an office for his company. There he met Emily Lynes and married her in Lillington, Leamington Spa in 1907. He was promoted at work and returned to Manchester, but in 1908 he became a full-time writer.

== Writing career ==
The first play written by Brighouse was Lonesome Like, but the first to be produced was The Doorway. This was performed in 1909 at Annie Horniman's Gaiety Theatre in Manchester and produced by Ben Iden Payne. Horniman and Payne assisted Brighouse during the early stages of his career. Many of his plays were one-act pieces; three of the best of these (The Northerners, Zack and The Game) were published together as Three Lancashire Plays in 1920. All of these plays were set in Lancashire, but Brighouse also wrote plays of a different type, such as The Oak Settle and Maid of France.

Brighouse wrote a number of one-act plays under the pseudonym "Olive Conway".

His most successful play was Hobson's Choice, first produced in 1915 in New York, where Payne was working. It was first produced in England in 1916 at the Apollo Theatre, London, where it played for 246 performances. The play has been adapted numerous times since, both for film and television. The best-known is David Lean's 1954 film. On the stage, it was revived at the National Theatre at the Old Vic, London, in 1964. The Crucible Theatre Sheffield staged a revival in June 2011 directed by Christopher Luscombe and starring Barrie Rutter, Zoe Waites and Philip McGinley.

Brighouse also wrote novels, including Hepplestalls, which concerned a Lancashire mill-owning family during the 19th century. Additionally, he wrote many reviews and other pieces for the Manchester Guardian. He was a member of the Dramatists' Club, and in 1930–31 was chairman of the Society of Authors' dramatic committee. After 1931 he wrote no more full-length plays. His autobiography What I Have Had was published in 1953.

== Other activities and later life ==
During the First World War, Brighouse was declared unfit for combat, but joined what later became the Royal Air Force, and was seconded to the Air Ministry Intelligence Staff, where in his spare time he wrote Hobson's Choice. In 1919 he relocated to Hampstead, London. In 1958 he collapsed in the Strand and died the next day in Charing Cross Hospital. His estate amounted to slightly less than £14,500.

== Bibliography ==
=== Selected plays ===
- The Doorway (1909)
- Lonesome-Like (1911), later a 1954 television movie.
- The Scaring Off Of Teddy Dawson (1911)
- The Oak Settle (1911)
- The Polygon (1911)
- The Price Of Coal (1911)
- The Odd Man Out (1912)
- Spring In Bloomsbury (1912)
- Graft (1913)
- Dealing In Futures (1913)
- The Game (1914)
- The Northerners (1914)
- Garside's Career (1915)
- The Followers (1915), later a 1939 television movie of the play with Austin Trevor, Marjorie Mars, Marjorie Lane.
- Hobson's Choice (1916)
- Maid Of France (1917)
- Zack (1920)
- Converts (1920)
- Plays for the Meadow and Plays for the Lawn (1921)
- Once A Hero (1922)
- Becky Sharp (1924), adapted from William Makepeace Thackeray's Vanity Fair *published under the name "Olive Conway"
- Little Red Shoes (1925)
- The Prince Who Was A Piper (1926)
- Six Fantasies (1931)
- The Dye-Hard (1934)
- The Inner Man (1945)

=== Novels ===
- Fossie For Short (1917)
- The Silver Lining (1918)
- The Marbeck Inn (1920)
- Hepplestall's (1922)
- The Wrong Shadow (1923)

=== Other works ===
- What I Have Had (1953), autobiography
