= Peter Ibbetson =

Peter Ibbetson may refer to:

- Peter Ibbetson (novel), an 1891 novel by George du Maurier
- Peter Ibbetson (film), a 1935 film directed by Henry Hathaway; based on the novel
- Peter Ibbetson (opera), an opera by Deems Taylor; based on the novel
- Peter Ibbetson (play), a play by John N. Raphael; based on the novel

== See also ==
- Forever (1921 film), a film based on the novel
