= David Leland (disambiguation) =

David Leland (1941–2023) was a British film director, screenwriter and actor.

David Leland may also refer to:

- David Leland (American actor) (1932–1948), American child actor
- David J. Leland (born 1953), American lawyer and politician from Ohio
