= Viva Birkett =

British actress (1887–1934)

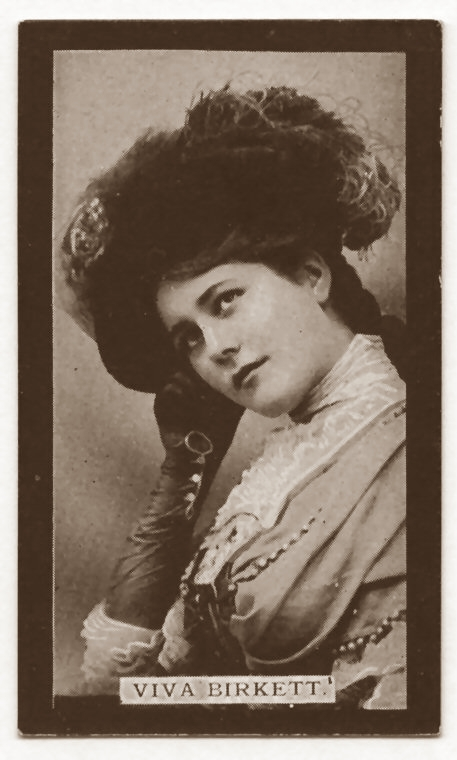
- NYPL Digital Gallery
- Born: Valentine Viola Birkett; 14 February 1887; Exeter, England
- Died: 27 June 1934 (aged 47); London, England
- Occupation: Stage actress
- Years active: 1906 - 1930
- Spouse: Philip Merivale (m. 1912)
- Children: 4 (including John Merivale)

Viva Birkett (14 February 1887 – 27 June 1934) was a British stage actress active on both sides of the Atlantic over the early decades of the twentieth century.

== Early life and career ==
Valentine (originally recorded as Valentina) Viola Birkett was born on Saint Valentine's Day, 1887 at the historic coastal town of Exeter in the south west of England. She was the daughter of William Henry and Myra Martha Birkett, both natives of Exeter, where her father worked as a woollen merchant. Viva studied acting under the American thespian Kate Bateman (1842–1917) and made her London stage debut on 28 June 1906 as a guest performer at the Lyric Theatre in a revival of Monsieur Beaucaire and her New York City debut at the Hudson Theatre on 30 August of that same year playing Helen Plugenet in Hypocrites. For the remainder of her career she would continue to perform in London and New York and tour with companies headed by George Arliss, Sir Herbert Beerbohm Tree, and Henry Jowett. Her last Broadway appearance was in June 1930 playing the Princess of San Luca in Death Takes a Holiday.

== Marriage and family ==
On 23 July 1912, Viva married British actor Philip Merivale at St Marylebone Parish Church in London. The couple became the parents of two daughters and two sons, Rosamund, Valentine, John, and Philip.

== Death ==
Viva Birkett died from cancer on 27 June 1934, less than a month after leaving New York to return to her home on Seymour Road in the London Borough of Richmond upon Thames. She was survived by her husband and children.

== Selected performances ==
- 1906: Monsieur Beaucaire adapted from the book by Booth Tarkington performed at the Lyric Theatre, London
- 1906–07: Hypocrites by Henry Arthur Jones performed at the Hudson Theatre, New York
- 1911: Twelfth Night by William Shakespeare performed at His Majesty's Theatre, London.
- 1911: The Merry Wives of Windsor (Anne Page) by William Shakespeare performed at His Majesty's Theatre, London.
- 1911: Macbeth (Lady Macduff) by William Shakespeare performed at His Majesty's Theatre, London.
- 1911–12: Peter Pan (Mrs. Darling) by J. M. Barrie performed at the Duke of York's Theatre, London
- 1913: Trust the People (Lady Violet Ainslie) by Stanley Houghton performed at the Garrick Theatre, London
- 1914: Trilby (Trilby O'Farrell) by George du Maurier
- 1914: Evidence by J. duRocher MacPherson performed at the Lyric Theatre, New York
- 1915: As You Like It (Rosalind) by William Shakespeare performed at the Boston Opera House, Boston, Massachusetts
- 1916: Caroline by W. Somerset Maugham performed at the Empire Theatre, New York
- 1919: The Mollusc (Mrs. Baker) by Hubert Henry Davies performed with the George Arliss Company
- 1922: A Prince of Lovers (Lady Jersey) by Alice Ramsey
- 1929–30: Death Takes a Holiday (Princess of San Luca) by Alberto Casella; adapted by Walter Ferris performed at the Ethel Barrymore Theatre, New York
