= The Perfect Cure (play) =

Play by Stanley Houghton

- Original language: English
- Written by: Stanley Houghton
- Genre: Comedy

Premiere
- Date: 17 June 1913
- Place: Apollo Theatre, London

The Perfect Cure is a 1913 comedy play by the British writer Stanley Houghton. A father is cured of his selfish habits by a charming widow.

His final play, premiering several months before his death, it was not a success unlike other recent hits Hindle Wakes and The Younger Generation. It ran for four performances at the Apollo Theatre in London's West End before being withdrawn. Houghton was present on opening night. The original cast included Cathleen Nesbitt and Charles Hawtrey.It was produced by Henry Lowenfeld.

== Bibliography ==
- Wearing, J.P. The London Stage 1910-1919: A Calendar of Productions, Performers, and Personnel.. Rowman & Littlefield, 2013.
