= Canaries Sometimes Sing (play) =

Play written by Frederick Lonsdale

Canaries Sometimes Sing is a comedy play by the British writer Frederick Lonsdale that was first staged in 1929 at the Globe Theatre in the West End. It represented the breakthrough role as a solo performer of the French comedienne Yvonne Arnaud.

== Film adaptation ==
In 1931 it was adapted into the British film Canaries Sometimes Sing directed by and starring Tom Walls along with Yvonne Arnaud and Cathleen Nesbitt.

== Bibliography ==
- Chambers, Colin. Continuum Companion to Twentieth Century Theatre. A&C Black, 2006.
- Donaldson, Frances. Freddy Lonsdale. Bloomsbury Publishing, 2011.
- Nicoll, Alardyce. English Drama, 1900-1930: The Beginnings of the Modern Period. Part I. Cambridge University Press, 1973.
