= Peter Ibbetson (novel) =

Novel by George du Maurier

Peter Ibbetson is a novel by George du Maurier. Published in 1891, it was Maurier's first novel. Journalist John N. Raphael adapted the novel into the stage play Peter Ibbetson which premiered on July 23, 1915, at His Majesty's Theatre. It later had a run on Broadway in 1917. The novel was adapted into the 1921 silent film Forever, and later into the Academy Award nominated film Peter Ibbetson (1935). Composer Deems Taylor and actress Constance Collier adapted the novel into the opera Peter Ibbetson which premiered at the Metropolitan Opera on February 7, 1931.
