= Trust the People =

Play by Stanley Houghton

- Original language: English
- Written by: Stanley Houghton
- Genre: Drama

Premiere
- Date: 6 February 1913
- Place: Garrick Theatre, London

Trust the People is a 1913 play by the British writer Stanley Houghton, who had gained popular attention with his hit Hindle Wakes the previous year. It centres around the activities of a group of government officials.

It ran for 44 performances at the Garrick Theatre in London's West End between 6 February and 13 March 1913. The original cast included Arthur Bourchier, Clifford Heatherley, Herbert Bunston, Cedric Hardwicke, Barbara Gott and Viva Birkett. A review in The Times felt the play showed Houghton was out of his depth writing works beyond his own personal experience, in contrast to his more successful Lancashire-set works, while another reviewer felt it was "theatrically exciting" if flawed.

The play was running in the West End at the same time as Houghton's latest hit The Younger Generation.

== Bibliography ==
- Wearing, J.P. The London Stage 1910-1919: A Calendar of Productions, Performers, and Personnel.. Rowman & Littlefield, 2013.
