= Nothing but Trouble (1944 film) =

1944 American film by Sam Taylor

Nothing But Trouble
- Theatrical poster
- Directed by: Sam Taylor
- Written by: Additional dialogue: Bradford Ropes; Margaret Gruen; Idea: Robert Halff
- Screenplay by: Russell Rouse; Ray Golden
- Produced by: B. F. Zeidman
- Starring: Stan Laurel; Oliver Hardy; Mary Boland; Philip Merivale; Henry O'Neill; David Leland
- Cinematography: Charles Salerno Jr.
- Edited by: Conrad A. Nervig
- Music by: Nathaniel Shilkret
- Production company: Metro-Goldwyn-Mayer
- Distributed by: Loew's Inc.
- Release date: December 6, 1944
- Running time: 69 minutes
- Country: United States
- Language: English

Nothing But Trouble is a 1944 Laurel and Hardy feature film released by Metro-Goldwyn-Mayer and directed by Sam Taylor.

Nothing but Trouble was completed in August 1944 but stayed on the shelf for seven months; MGM was rushing all of its military-themed productions into release first. When Nothing but Trouble was finally released in March 1945, it became a surprise hit internationally as moviegoers, waiting anxiously for the war to end, flocked to the Laurel & Hardy movie as an escapist comedy. Nothing but Trouble was Laurel & Hardy's most successful feature film, earning $1,500,000 in ticket sales.

== Plot ==
Stan Laurel and Oliver Hardy, descendants of illustrious ancestry as a butler and chef, find themselves unemployed in the year 1932. Their attempts to secure employment abroad prove futile, prompting their return to the U.S. in 1944, where they are suddenly besieged by eager employers in dire need of domestic assistance.

Their encounter with social climber Elvira Hawkley leads to an invitation to her grand formal dinner, graced by the presence of the exiled King Christopher of Orlandia. Christopher, a boy king, is oblivious to the treacherous schemes of his uncle, Prince Saul, who fears that his own chances for the throne will be dashed if his nephew brings democratic ideas to the people of Orlandia.

In a turn of events, Laurel and Hardy inadvertently pilfer horsemeat from the local zoo instead of procuring the desired steak for the dinner. Unbeknownst to them, King Christopher joins their escapades, seeking refuge in their company. However, the culinary debacle ensues as the inexperienced servants struggle to carve the unconventional meat, resulting in dinner's untimely ruin and the embarrassment of the Hawkley hosts.

Discovering Christopher's presence, Mrs. Hawkley expels them from the premises, unaware of his royal identity. Seeking sanctuary at a local mission, their misadventures take a dramatic turn when a tramp identifies Christopher from a news photo and alerts the authorities. Subsequent events see Laurel and Hardy exonerated of any wrongdoing, with King Christopher extending an offer of employment to them. Meanwhile, Prince Saul, seizing upon their unwitting involvement, plots the monarch's demise by poisoning him. Stan and Ollie, judiciously juggling the plates from hand to hand, foil the plot.

Christopher confronts his uncle, who forces Christopher and his friends out on a skyscraper ledge. Christopher escapes but Stan and Ollie have some anxious moments in midair. Christopher brings the police, the crisis is averted, and justice prevails as Prince Saul meets his own demise.

The narrative concludes on a jovial note, with Christopher, Oliver, and Stan celebrating their triumph while singing the Notre Dame victory march.

== Cast ==
- Stan Laurel - Stanley
- Oliver Hardy - Oliver
- Mary Boland - Mrs. Hawkley
- Philip Merivale - Prince Saul
- Henry O'Neill - Mr. Hawkley
- David Leland - King Christopher
- John Warburton - Ronetz
- Matthew Boulton - Prince Prentiloff
- Connie Gilchrist - Mrs. Flannigan
- John Berkes - Tramp informant (uncredited)
- Tom Brannigan - Willis
- Cliff Clark - Police Sergeant
- Chester Clute - Clerk in 1944
- Garry Owen - Clerk in 1932
- Gino Corrado - Mr. Kitteridge
- Frank Darien - Old Man
- Steve Darrell - Zoo Attendant
- Jean De Briac - French Restaurateur
- Joan Delmer - Timekeeper
- Robert Dudley - bit role
- Eddie Dunn - Policeman in Flop House
- Edward Earle - bit role
- William Frambes - Ocean Liner Passenger
- Rita Gould- bit role
- Grayce Hampton - Mrs. Herkheimer
- Dell Henderson - Painter
- Leyland Hodgson - Felcon
- William J. Holmes - Royal Courtier
- Robert Homans - Jailer
- Olin Howland - Painter's Foreman
- Charles Irwin - Karel
- Edward Keane - Police Chief Smith
- Nolan Leary - Painter
- Jack Lindquist - Kid
- Roger McGee - Referee
- Howard M. Mitchell - Zoo Attendant
- Forbes Murray - Police Official
- Mayo Newhall - Royal Courtier
- Toby Noolan - Royal Courtier
- Robert Emmett O'Connor - Police Officer Mulligan
- Lee Phelps - Rankin's Friend
- Paul Porcasi - Italian Restaurateur
- Tom Quinn - bit role
- Bob Stebbins - Chuck
- Ray Teal - Police Officer
- John Valentine - Attache
- John Vosper - Attendant
- Robert Winkler - Busby
- Joe Yule - Police Officer

== Trailer discrepancies ==
Coming-attractions trailers often used alternate takes not used in the finished film. This was because the alternates were original, first-generation film and would yield better quality than second-generation scenes copied from the completed feature. The Nothing but Trouble trailer shows a different take of Stan dancing at the end, and a different take at the zoo.

== Production notes ==
During the late 1930s and 1940s, great silent-screen comedian Buster Keaton, a close friend of Stan Laurel, worked as a gagman at Metro-Goldwyn-Mayer and supplied gags for Nothing but Trouble. At Stan Laurel's funeral in 1965, Keaton said that he believed Laurel to a greater comedian than Charlie Chaplin.

Jack Lindquist, as one of the football-playing kids, eventually became president of Disneyland between 1990 and 1993.
