= Trilby (1914 film) =

- Directed by: Harold M. Shaw
- Production company: London Film Productions
- Distributed by: Jury films
- Release date: July 1914 (United Kingdom)
- Running time: 8 minutes
- Country: United Kingdom

Trilby is a 1914 British silent drama film directed by Harold M. Shaw and starring Herbert Beerbohm Tree, Viva Birkett, and Charles Rock. It is based on Tree's 1895 stage production of Trilby, itself an adaptation of the 1894 novel of the same name by George du Maurier.

== Premise ==
Trilby, a young singer, falls under the dominance of Svengali.

== Cast ==
- Herbert Beerbohm Tree – Svengali
- Viva Birkett – Trilby O'Farrell
- Charles Rock – Sandy McAllister
- Ion Swinley – Little Billee
- Philip Merivale – Taffy Wynne
- Wyndham Guise – Mr O'Ferrall
- Cicely Richards – Madame Vinard
- Douglas Munro – Reverend Bagot
