= The Hour Before the Dawn =

1944 film by Frank Tuttle

- Directed by: Frank Tuttle
- Written by: Michael Hogan; Lesser Samuels
- Based on: novel by W. Somerset Maugham
- Produced by: William Dozier
- Starring: Franchot Tone; Veronica Lake
- Cinematography: John Seitz
- Edited by: Stuart Gilmore
- Music by: Miklós Rózsa
- Production company: Paramount Pictures
- Distributed by: Paramount Pictures
- Release date: May 10, 1944 (New York City)
- Running time: 74 minutes
- Country: United States
- Language: English

The Hour Before the Dawn is a 1944 American drama war film directed by Frank Tuttle starring Franchot Tone and Veronica Lake. It was based on the 1942 novel by W. Somerset Maugham.

== Plot ==
In 1923 in England, General Hetherton is instructing his grandson Jim to shoot a rifle. Jim's dog runs in the way and Jim accidentally kills him. The incident affects him deeply and he becomes a pacifist.

In 1939, Jim is headmaster at a school and has fallen in love with a young Austrian woman, Dora Bruckman, who works for his sister-in-law, May. He is unaware that Dora is a Nazi spy. She meets regularly with her supervisors in London, Mrs. Müller and Kurt van der Breughel, who pose as Austrian refugees.

With the outbreak of World War II, Jim's brother Roger joins the Royal Air Force, but Jim's pacifism leads him to apply for exemption from fighting, which is granted. Jim is required to find farm work, to aid in the war effort. He finds this difficult, because many farmers do not respect the fact that he is a conscientious objector, and do not want him on their farms. Dora is ordered to provide German bombers with a bearing to a camouflaged airfield where Roger is stationed, using the headlights of May's car. She is caught in the act by May's son Tommy, but claims May must have left the lights on. Dora has to turn them off before the bombers arrive, so the airfield is saved.

When all enemy aliens are ordered out of the district near the airfield, Dora marries Jim, to save her from being interned. Kurt plans to use Jim in an effort to convince influential English people to consider capitulation. He sends a fake letter to Jim, asking him to join an effort to educate refugee children, a task Jim is eager to accept. When they meet, Kurt suggests to Jim that the Germans might consider negotiating terms for peace with Britain. Jim tells Dora afterwards that Kurt spoke more like a German than a Dutchman.

Worried, Dora telephones van der Breughel and recommends bombing the airfield that night. She pours gasoline over a hay wagon, but Tommy shows up unexpectedly and sees what she is doing. She locks him in a room, but when he blurts out that he knows what she is up to, she pulls out a pistol. Just then, she hears the bombers approaching and rushes out to set fire to the hay, to guide the bombers.

While Roger gets confirmation that Dora is a saboteur, Tommy escapes, encounters Jim, and tells him of his wife's betrayal. When Jim arrives home, Dora is packed and ready to leave. She admits to being a spy and then shoots him in the shoulder, before her gun jams. Jim kills her, just before Roger arrives. Afterward, Jim joins the Royal Air Force as a gunner.

== Cast ==
- Franchot Tone as Jim Hetherton
- Veronica Lake as Dora Bruckmann
- John Sutton as Roger Hetherton
- Binnie Barnes as May Hetherton
- Henry Stephenson as General Hetherton
- Philip Merivale as Sir Leslie Buchanon
- Nils Asther as Kurt van der Breughel
- Edmund Breon as Freddy Merritt
- David Leland as Tommy Hetherton
- Aminta Dyne as Hertha Parkins

== Production ==
The novel was published in 1942. Film rights were bought by Paramount while the project was in galley form, prior to Pearl Harbor. When the book was published, it became a best seller, but Paramount were reluctant to make a film based on it because it was about a conscientious objector - something that was felt to be palatable to the American public while the USA was neutral, but not after. However, after time passed, executives began to feel the public would be sympathetic to a movie about a genuine objector, as it was one of the freedoms the Allies were fighting for.

The movie was the first film produced by William Dozier, who had worked as a story editor at Paramount for a number of years. Shooting started in April 1943. Because of dim-out restrictions, night scenes were shot in Phoenix, Arizona.

== Reception ==
According to Diabolique, the film "flopped at the box office, and Lake copped a lot of the blame. It wasn’t really her fault. Yes, she’s not very good, uncomfortable with an accent and not really capable of conveying too much depth, but lots of other people in the movie are even worse."

== See also ==
- List of American films of 1944
