= Cathleen Nesbitt =

English actress (1888–1982)

Cathleen Nesbitt CBE
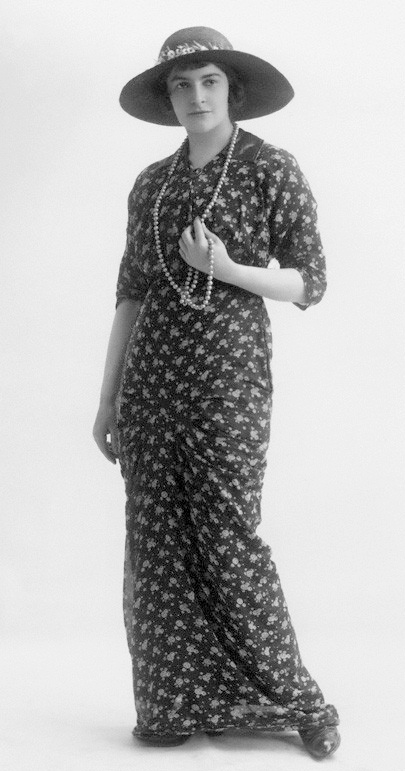
- Nesbitt in 1913
- Born: Kathleen Mary Nesbitt; 24 November 1888; Birkenhead, Cheshire, England
- Died: 2 August 1982 (aged 93); London, England
- Occupation: Actress
- Years active: 1910–1981
- Spouse: Cecil Ramage (m. 1921)
- Children: 2

Cathleen Nesbitt CBE (born Kathleen Mary Nesbitt; 24 November 1888 – 2 August 1982) was an English actress.

== Early life and education ==
Kathleen Mary Nesbitt was born in Birkenhead, Cheshire, England, in 1888. She was of Welsh and Irish descent. Her parents were Thomas and Mary Catherine (née Parry) Nesbitt. She was educated in Lisieux, France, and at the Queen's University of Belfast and the Sorbonne. Her younger brother, Thomas Nesbitt, Jr., acted in one film in 1925, before his death in South Africa in 1927 from an apparent heart attack.

== Career ==
Nesbitt made her debut in London in the stage revival of Arthur Wing Pinero's The Cabinet Minister (1910). She acted in many plays after that. In 1911, she joined the Irish Players, went to the United States and debuted on Broadway in The Well of the Saints. She also was in the cast of John Millington Synge's The Playboy of the Western World with the Irish Players when the whole cast was pelted with fruits and vegetables by the offended Irish American Catholic audience.

Nesbitt returned to the United States and appeared on Broadway in Quinneys (1915) and John Galsworthy's Justice (1916) as John Barrymore's leading lady in his first dramatic stage role. After five other plays there, she returned to England. For the rest of the decade she performed in London; her roles included the title role in a revival of John Webster's The Duchess of Malfi. Her film debut was in the silent A Star Over Night (1919). She then performed in The Faithful Heart (1922). She did not appear in a film again until 1930, when she played the role of Anne Lymes in Canaries Sometimes Sing, which was an early talkie. In 1932, she appeared in The Frightened Lady. She appeared in the 1938 film version of Pygmalion as "a lady" who attends the Embassy ball. In the opening credits her first name was spelled as "Kathleen", but as "Cathleen" at the end of the film. She played the role of Lady Macbeth in the 1945 16 minute short film " Famous Scenes From Shakespeare No 2: Macbeth ." She played the part of Mother in the 1949 BBC TV remake of the drama film Elizabeth of Ladymead, and Julia in the August premiere of T.S. Eliot's play The Cocktail Party.

Nesbitt's first Hollywood film was Three Coins in the Fountain (1954), in which she played the character role of La Principessa. This was followed that same year by Black Widow, in which she played Lucia Colletti. She was Cary Grant's Grandmother Janou in 1957's An Affair to Remember (though she was only 16 years older than Grant) and, the following year, was part of the ensemble cast of Separate Tables. She also appeared in The Parent Trap (1961), and Promise Her Anything (1965).

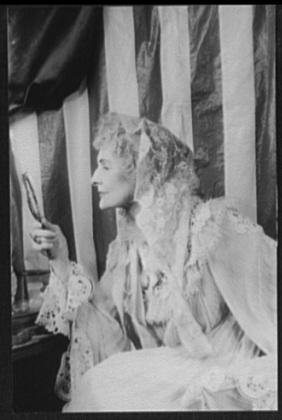
Nesbitt as Aunt Alicia in Gigi in 1952

Other Broadway appearances included Aunt Alicia in the original Anita Loos adaptation of Gigi (1951), Sabrina Fair (1953), and Anastasia (1954). In 1956, she played Mrs. Higgins in My Fair Lady starring Rex Harrison. Nesbitt reprised the role in 1981, in her 90s, in a Broadway revival, opposite Harrison, who was in his 70s.

Nesbitt portrayed Agatha Morley, the mother of a Congressman (played by William Windom) and mother-in-law to his former governess (played by Inger Stevens), in the TV series The Farmer's Daughter from 1963 to 1966. She guest starred on such shows as The United States Steel Hour; Wagon Train; Naked City, Dr. Kildare and Upstairs, Downstairs (as Rachel Gurney's mother, Mabel, Countess of Southwold).

In 1969, Nesbitt played Richard Burton's mother in the film Staircase and again in Villain two years later. She had a small but memorable role as an elderly drug addict in French Connection II (1975) alongside Gene Hackman. Her next film was Alfred Hitchcock's Family Plot (1976), in which she played Julia Rainbird. She then appeared as the grandmother in Julia (1977). Her final film was Never Never Land (1980) as Edith Forbes.

== Personal life ==
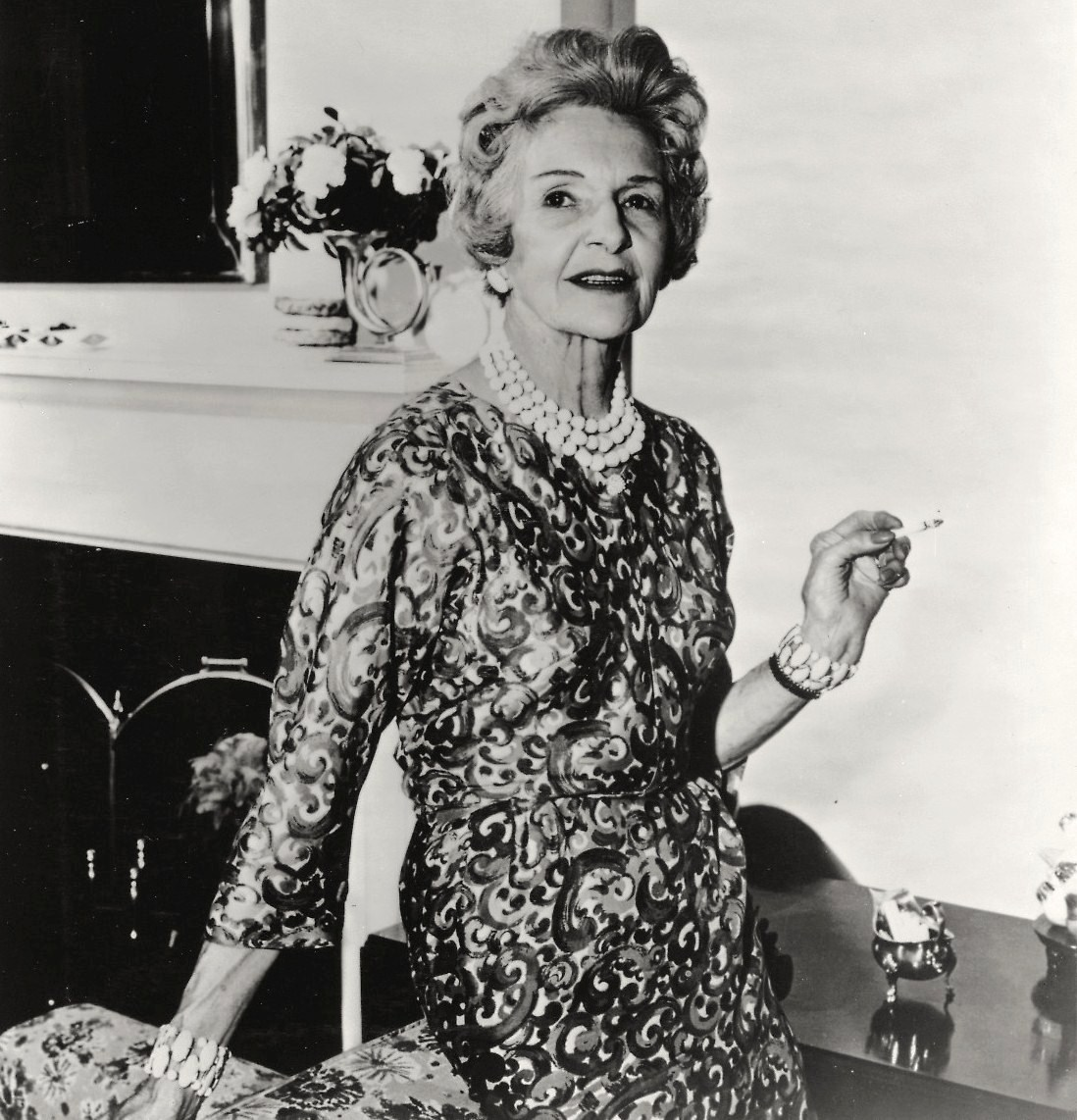
Nesbitt in the 1961 film The Parent Trap

In 1912, Nesbitt became the love of English poet Rupert Brooke, who wrote love sonnets to her. They were engaged to be married, but he died in 1915 at age 27 of blood poisoning, the result of a bite from an infected mosquito while he served in the Royal Navy during World War I.

Nesbitt lived for many years in the United States, but returned to the United Kingdom, where she was appointed a Commander of the Order of the British Empire (CBE) in 1978. Her autobiography, A Little Love and Good Company, was published in 1973.

Nesbitt died of natural causes at age 93 in London on 2 August 1982.

== Partial filmography ==
Year	Title	Role	Notes
1919	A Star Over Night		Short film
1922	The Faithful Heart	Diana Oughterson	
1922	Mary Queen of Scots	Mary, Queen of Scots	Short film
1930	Canaries Sometimes Sing	Anne Lymes	
1932	The Frightened Lady	Lady Lebanon	
1934	Falling in Love	Mother	
1935	The Passing of the Third Floor Back	Mrs. Tomkin	
1936	Well Done, Henry	Mrs. McNab	
1936	The Beloved Vagabond	Mme. Boin	
1936	Hearts of Humanity	Mrs. Bamford	
1937	Knights for a Day	Lady Agatha	
1937	Against the Tide	Margaret Leigh	
1938	Pygmalion	Old Lady	
1938	A Dream of Love	Baroness St. Cricq	Short film; Uncredited
1940	Law and Disorder	Miss. Sampson	
1940	The Door with Seven Locks	Ann Cody	
1943	The Lamp Still Burns	The Matron	
1944	Fanny by Gaslight	Kate Somerford	
1945	The Agitator	Mrs. Montrose	
1945	Caesar and Cleopatra	Egyptian Lady	Uncredited
1946	Men of Two Worlds	Mrs. Upjohn	
1947	The Life and Adventures of Nicholas Nickleby	Miss Knag	
1947	Jassy	Elizabeth Twisdale	
1949	Madness of the Heart	Mother Superior	
1950	So Long at the Fair	Madame Hervé	
1954	Three Coins in the Fountain	Principessa	
1954	Black Widow	Lucia Colletti	
1954	Désirée	Mme. Bonaparte	
1957	An Affair to Remember	Grandmother Janou	
1957	Trooper Hook		
1958	Separate Tables	Lady Matheson	
1961	The Parent Trap	Louise McKendrick	
1963	The Farmer's Daughter (1963 to 1966)	Agatha Morley	TV Series - Comedy
1966	Promise Her Anything	Mrs. Brock	
1966	The Trygon Factor	Livia Embarday	
1969	Staircase	Harry's Mother	
1971	Villain	Mrs. Dakin	
1975	French Connection II	The Old Lady	
1976	Family Plot	Julia Rainbird	
1977	Full Circle	Heather Rudge	
1977	Julia	Grandmother	
1980	Never Never Land	Edith Forbes	Last film role

== Selected stage credits ==
- The Eldest Son by John Galsworthy (1912)
- The Perfect Cure by Stanley Houghton (1913)
- Loyalties by John Galsworthy (1922)
- Diversion by John Van Druten (1927)
- Good Losers by Michael Arlen and Walter Hackett (1931)
- Somebody Knows by John Van Druten (1932)
- Land's End by F.L. Lucas (1938)
- The Shop at Sly Corner by Edward Percy Smith (1945)
- The Uninvited Guest by Mary Hayley Bell (1953)
- My Fair Lady by Alan Jay Lerner and Frederick Loewe (1956)
