= Never Never Land (film) =

- Petula Clark and Anne Seymour
- Directed by: Paul Annett
- Written by: Marjorie L. Sigley
- Produced by: Diane Baker
- Starring: Petula Clark; Cathleen Nesbitt; John Castle; Anne Seymour; Heather Miller; Evelyn Laye; Roland Culver
- Music by: (orchestrator/arranger); Ron Grainer (theme song); Jane NcNealy
- Distributed by: Sharp Features
- Release date: 1980
- Running time: 85 min.
- Country: United Kingdom
- Language: English

Never Never Land is a 1980 British drama film directed by Paul Annett and starring Petula Clark (in her final film role to date), Cathleen Nesbitt (also in her final film role), John Castle, and Anne Seymour. It is named after Never Never Land, the magical setting of the classic children's tales of Peter Pan.

== Plot synopsis ==
Seven-year-old Jennie (Heather Miller) has been abandoned by her parents and left in the care of her aunt Bee (Petula Clark) and uncle Jim (John Castle). Jennie is treated poorly by her two elder cousins, and taking her lead from the story Peter and Wendy, she runs away from home with her younger cousin Joe (Christian Henson). She finds shelter in an abandoned London townhouse occupied by a gang of young ruffians, and becomes the equivalent of Wendy Darling, role-playing "mother" to the Lost Boys. An old woman named Edith Forbes (Cathleen Nesbitt, in her final screen performance) befriends the girl.

== Cast ==
- Petula Clark as Bee
- Cathleen Nesbitt as Edith Forbes
- Anne Seymour as Zena
- Michael J. Shannon as Peter
- John Castle as Jim
- Heather Miller as Jennie
- Christian Henson as Joe
- Evelyn Laye as Millie
- Roland Culver as Mr. Salford
- James Marcus as P.C. Stubbs

== Reception ==
Produced by actress Diane Baker, it was unsuccessful in the UK and received a limited commercial release in the US. It was later broadcast by HBO in the mid-1980s.

The film's theme song "Fly Away" was composed by Jane McNealy and Alice Kuhns. It is included on The Petula Clark Anthology: Downtown to Sunset Boulevard, a CD released in 2000.
