= John Merivale =

Canadian-British actor (1917–1990)

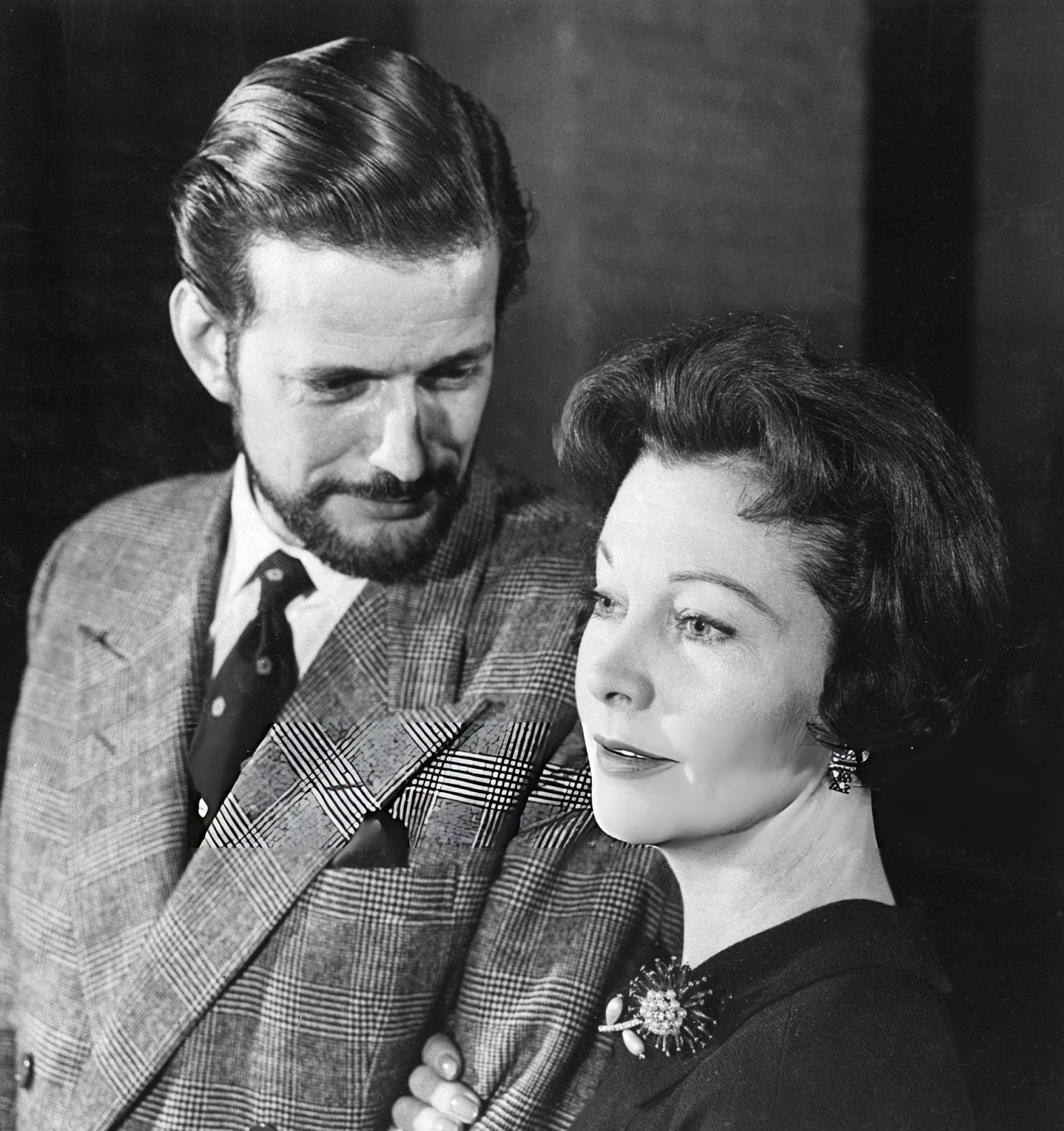
- Merivale (left) and Vivien Leigh in 1961
- Born: John Herman Merivale; 1 December 1917; Toronto, Ontario, Canada
- Died: 6 February 1990 (aged 72); London, England
- Other name: Jack Merivale
- Education: New College, Oxford
- Occupation: Actor
- Spouses: Jan Sterling (m. 1941; div. 1948); Dinah Sheridan (m. 1986)
- Partner: Vivien Leigh (1960–1967)
- Parents: Philip Merivale; Viva Birkett
- Relatives: Herman Charles Merivale (granduncle); Herman Merivale (great-granduncle); Charles Merivale (great-granduncle)

John Herman Merivale (1 December 1917 – 6 February 1990), also credited as Jack Merivale, was a Canadian-British actor. He appeared on Broadway and the West End, and played mainly supporting roles in films. He was also the longtime companion (and eventual caretaker) of Vivien Leigh.

== Early life ==
Merivale was born in Toronto in 1917. He was the son of English actors Philip Merivale and Viva Birkett. His stepmother was the English actress Gladys Cooper. He was raised in Canada, England, and the United States, and educated at Rugby School in Warwickshire and New College, Oxford.

== Career ==
Merivale made his acting debut at age 15, playing the small role of a newsboy in James Whale's The Invisible Man (1933). His stage career started when he was 21, as an understudy in a production of A Midsummer Night's Dream, where he first met Vivien Leigh. He later worked in the 1940 Broadway production of Romeo and Juliet by Leigh and her husband, Laurence Olivier.

Merivale's career was put on hold while he served as a pilot with both the British and Canadian air forces during World War II. He resumed his career in 1946, with a starring role in a successful Broadway production of Oscar Wilde's Lady Windermere's Fan.

In 1956 Merivale made his second film appearance, in The Battle of the River Plate. He went on to have supporting roles in films such as A Night to Remember (1958), Circus of Horrors (1960), House of Mystery (1961), The List of Adrian Messenger (1963), (where he played the title character, who is killed thirteen minutes into the film), King Rat (1965), and Arabesque (1966).

Although Merivale had the leading role in the Italian horror film Caltiki - il mostro immortale (1959), he tended to concentrate on theatre work, in such productions as Venus Observed, Anne of the Thousand Days, The Reluctant Debutante and The Last of Mrs. Cheyney.

== Personal life ==
He was married to American actress actress Jan Sterling from 1941 until 1948, and lived with Vivien Leigh from 1960 until her death in 1967, becoming her dedicated caretaker in her final years. He began a relationship with actress Dinah Sheridan in 1968; they married in 1986.

=== Death ===
Merivale died at Charing Cross Hospital in London from kidney failure, on 6 February 1990.

== Partial stage credits ==
Year	Title	Role	Venue	Notes
1938	Lorelei	Robert	Longacre Theatre, New York City	
1939	Journey's End	2Lt Raleigh	Empire Theatre, New York City	
1940	Romeo and Juliet	Balthasar	51st Street Theatre, New York City	
1946–47	Lady Windermere's Fan	Sir James Royston	Cort Theatre, New York City	
1947–48	An Inspector Calls	Eric Birling	Booth Theatre, New York City	
1948	Anne of the Thousand Days	Mark Smeaton	Shubert Theatre, New York City	
1950	The Day After Tomorrow	Ernest	Booth Theatre, New York City	
1951	Getting Married	Cecil Sykes	ANTA Playhouse, New York City	
1952	Venus Observed	Edgar	New Century Theatre, New York City	
1952–53	The Deep Blue Sea	Philip Welch	Morosco Theatre, New York City	
1954	The Love of Four Colonels	Colonel Aime Frappot	Her Majesty’s Theatre, Carlisle	
1955–57	The Reluctant Debutante	David Hoylake-Johnston	UK tour	
1955–57	The Reluctant Debutante	David Hoylake-Johnston	Henry Miller's Theatre, New York City	
1960	Duel of Angels	Armand	Helen Hayes Theatre, New York City	
1961–62	Duel of Angels	Armand	Australian tour	
1961–62	Twelfth Night		Australian tour	
1961–62	The Lady of the Camellias		Australian tour	
1964	Mary, Mary	Dirk Winston	Theatre Royal, Windsor	
1965	Ivanov	Yevgeni Lvov	UK tour	
1966	Ivanov	Yevgeni Lvov	Shubert Theatre, New York City	
1967	The Sacred Flame	Maurice Tabret	Duke of York’s Theatre, London	
1967	The Last of Mrs. Cheyney	Lord Dilling	Phoenix Theatre, London	
1967	The Last of Mrs. Cheyney	Lord Dilling	Yvonne Arnaud Theatre, Guildford	
1968	Robert’s Wife	Reverend Robert Carson	Yvonne Arnaud Theatre, Guildford	
1969	A Talent to Amuse		Phoenix Theatre, London	
1970	Time Out of Mind	Sir James Hardruth	Yvonne Arnaud Theatre, Guildford	
1971	Look, No Hands!	Paul Sankey	UK tour	

== Filmography ==
=== Film ===
Year	Title	Role	Notes
1933	The Invisible Man	Newsboy	Uncredited
1956	The Battle of the River Plate	Cowburn	Uncredited
1958	A Night to Remember	Robbie Lucas	
1958	Caltiki – The Immortal Monster	Professor John Fielding	
1960	Circus of Horrors	Edward Finsbury	
1961	House of Mystery	Clive	
1963	The List of Adrian Messenger	Adrian Messenger	
1963	80,000 Suspects	Mr. Bradley	Uncredited
1965	King Rat	Colonel Foster	
1966	Arabesque	Major Sylvester Pennington Sloane	

=== Television ===
Year	Title	Role	Notes
1950	The Philco Television Playhouse		Episode: "Uncle Dynamite"
1950	Actors Studio		2 episodes
1951	Prudential Family Playhouse		Episode: "The Bishop Misbehaves"
1951	The Clock		Episode: "The Silent Hand"
1952	Celanese Theatre		Episode: "The Distaff Sides"
1952	Robert Montgomery Presents	Julian	Episode: "The Ringmaster"
1955	The Reluctant Debutante	David Hoylake–Johnston	TV movie
1955, 1959	Play of the Week	Michel, Gaylord Easterbrook	2 episodes
1957	Hour of Mystery	David Bracken	Episode: "The Man in Half Moon Street"
1957	The Vise	Tim Mills	Episode: "Fast Cars and Girls"
1959	Sunday Night Theatre	Roger Collard	Episode: "The Gentle Goddess"
1959	The Third Man	Charles Soames	Episode: "A Collector's Item"
1959	Television Playhouse	Lieutenant	Episode: "Oggie"
1960	Knight Errant Limited	Max Furguson	Episode: "A Tormented Mind"
1961	Theatre 70	Lawrence Ryder	Episode: "Chance Witness"
1969	The Coward Revue		TV movie
