= Philip Merivale =

English actor and screenwriter (1886–1946)

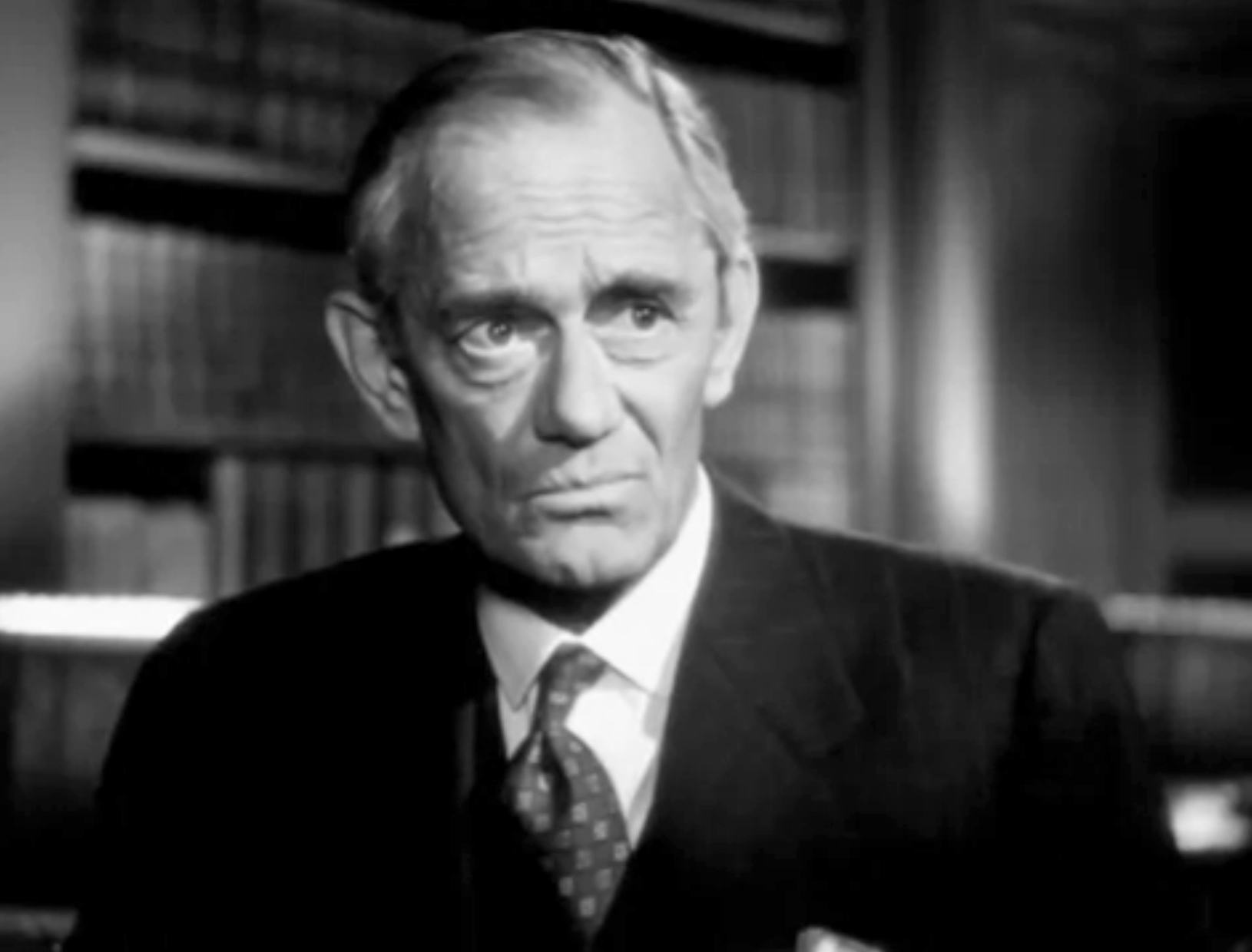
- Merivale in The Stranger (1946)
- Born: 2 November 1886; Rehutia, Manickpur, India
- Died: 12 March 1946 (aged 59); Los Angeles, California, U.S.
- Occupations: Actor; screenwriter
- Years active: 1914–1946
- Spouses: Viva Birkett (m. 1912; died 1934) Gladys Cooper (m. 1937)
- Children: 4, including John
- Relatives: Herman Charles Merivale, uncle

Philip Merivale (2 November 1886 – 12 March 1946) was an English film and stage actor and screenwriter.

== Early years ==
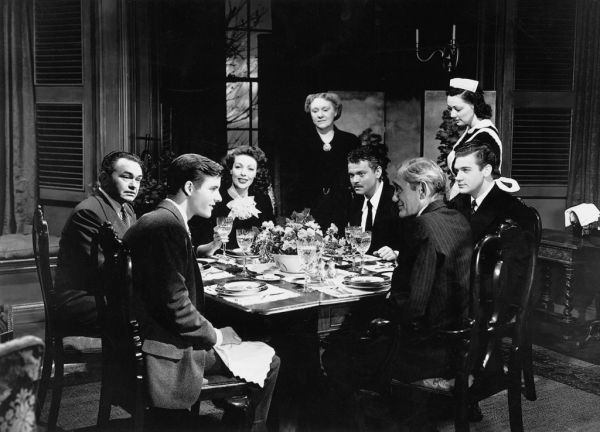
Left to right: Edward G. Robinson, Richard Long, Loretta Young, Martha Wentworth, Orson Welles, Merivale, Byron Keith, and an unidentified actress in The Stranger (1946)

Merivale was born on 2 November 1886 in Rehutia, Manickpur, India, to railway engineer Walter Merivale (1855–1902) and Emma Magdalene Merivale ("Maggie"; née Pittman; 1854–1940); his father's profession meant the family lived in India, Costa Rica, and Barbados (where he was Manager of the Barbados Railway) before settling at Chiswick. Philip's sister, Dorothea, was married to the civil servant Sir Henry Bunbury, Accountant-General of the Post Office. His uncle, Herman Charles Merivale, was an English dramatist.

Merivale graduated from St Edward's School, Oxford. He planned to have a career in business and worked as an office boy in London before an interest in the stage took priority.

== Career ==
Merivale was a respected stage actor who entered the cinema during the silent era. Merivale appeared in 20 films and also scripted one.

Merivale's professional stage debut came in 1906 in the F. R. Benson company's production of the Orestean Trilogy of Aeschylus. His Broadway debut came in The Scarlet Pimpernel (1910), and he was in Henry of Navarre (1910) on Broadway before he returned to England. He appeared in approximately 50 plays before returning to the United States in 1914 in a production of Pygmalion. Much of his theatrical training in England came under Herbert Beerbohm Tree.

Merivale's career was interrupted by his service in the Canadian Air Force during World War I, after which he came back to the United States in 1919, touring with George Arliss. After a return to England, he performed again in the United States, this time portraying Bassanio in The Merchant of Venice.

Merivale's radio debut occurred on February 11, 1930, when he starred in "Death Takes a Holiday", the premiere episode of Play of the Month on CBS.

== Personal life and death ==
Merivale was twice married to:

- the actress Viva Birkett (23 July 1912 – 27 June 1934); (four children: two daughters and two sons, including the actor John Merivale)
- the actress Gladys Cooper (30 April 1937 – 12 March 1946).

He died from a heart ailment aged 59.

== Broadway roles ==
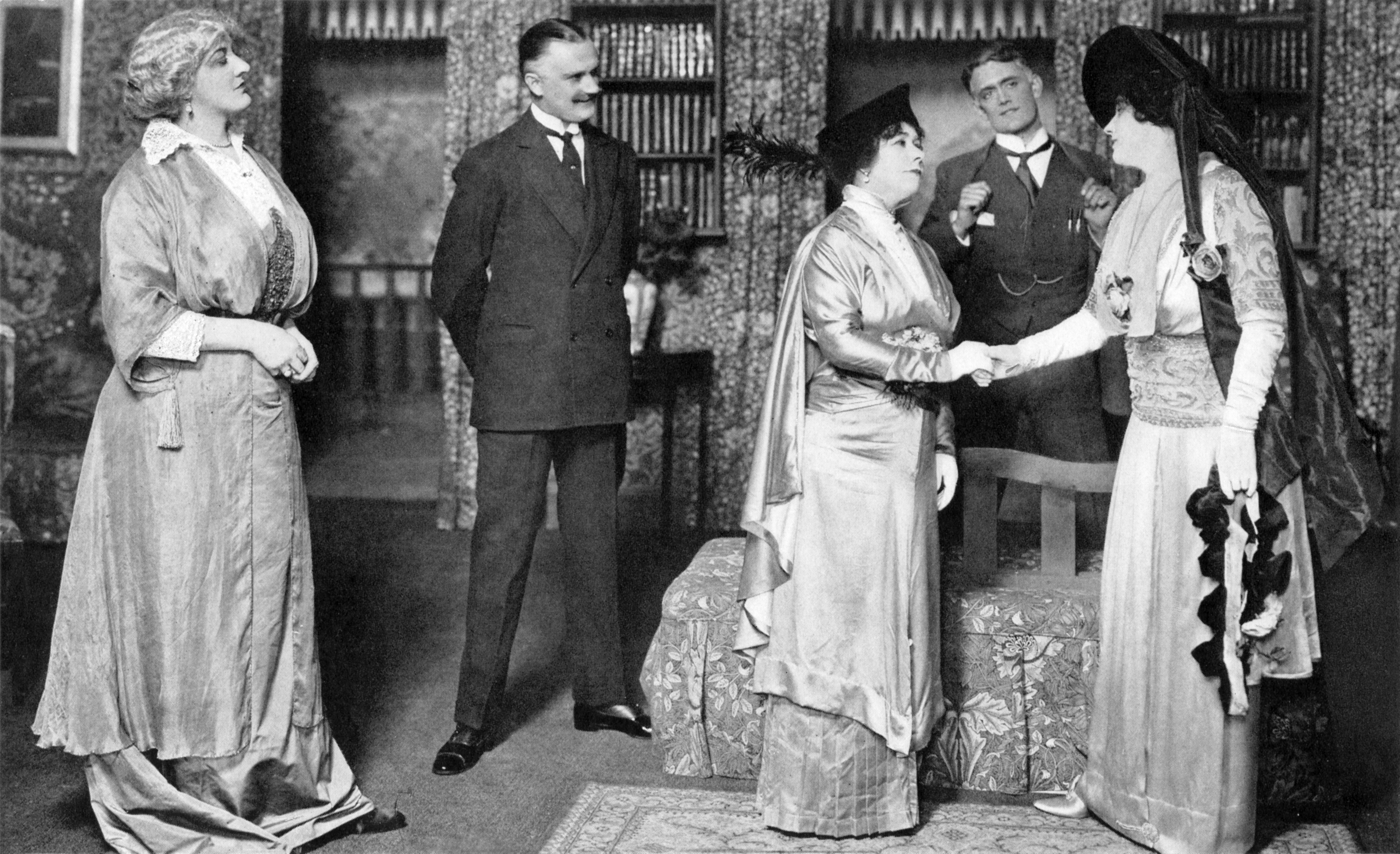
After creating the role of Col. Pickering in the London production of Pygmalion, Philip Merivale (second from right) played Henry Higgins opposite Mrs. Patrick Campbell (right) when Shaw's play was taken to Broadway (1914)

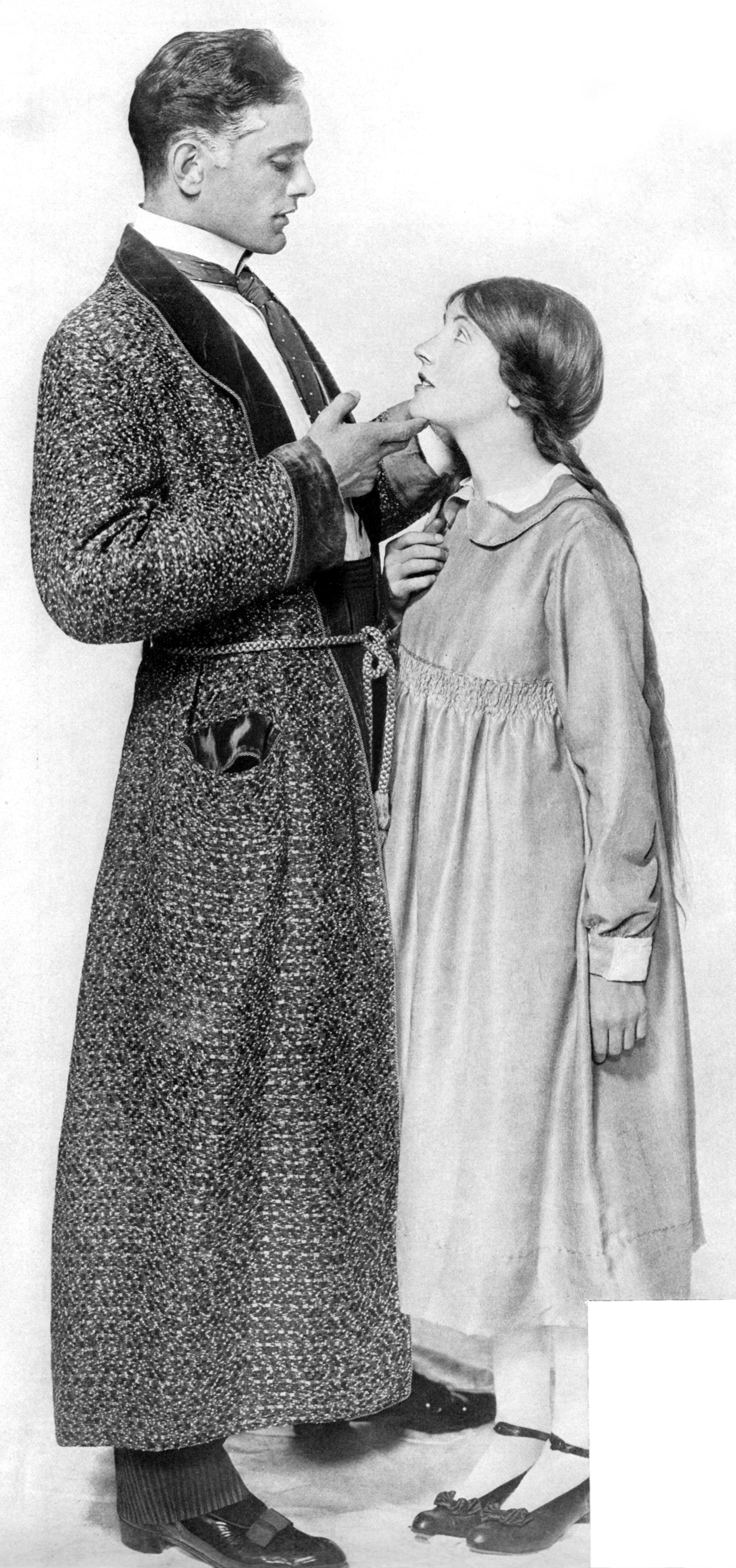
Philip Merivale and Patricia Collinge in the Broadway production of Pollyanna (1916)

- Pygmalion (1914) – Henry Higgins
- Pollyanna (1916) – John Pendleton
- The Swan (1923) – Prince Albert
- The Road to Rome (1927) – Hannibal
- Mary of Scotland (1933) – James Hepburn, 4th Earl of Bothwell
- Valley Forge (1934) – George Washington

== Filmography ==
- Trilby (1914) – Taffy Wynne
- Whispering Shadows (1921) – Stephen Pryde
- I Loved You Wednesday (1933) – (uncredited)
- Give Us This Night (1936) – Marcello Bonelli
- All In (1936, Writer)
- Mr. & Mrs. Smith (1941) – Mr. Ashley Custer
- Rage in Heaven (1941) – Mr. Higgins
- Pacific Blackout (1941) – John Runnel
- Lady for a Night (1942) – Stephen Alderson
- This Above All (1942) – Dr. Roger Cathaway
- Crossroads (1942) – Commissaire
- Hangmen Also Die! (1943) – Policeman (uncredited)
- This Land Is Mine (1943) – Professor Sorel
- Lost Angel (1943) – Professor Peter Vincent
- The Hour Before the Dawn (1944) – Sir Leslie Buchanon
- Nothing But Trouble (1944) – Prince Saul
- Tonight and Every Night (1945) – Reverend Gerald Lundy
- Adventure (1945) – Old Ramon Estado
- The Stranger (1946) – Judge Adam Longstreet
- Sister Kenny (1946) – Dr. Brack (final film role)
