= George du Maurier =

French-British cartoonist and novelist (1834–1896)

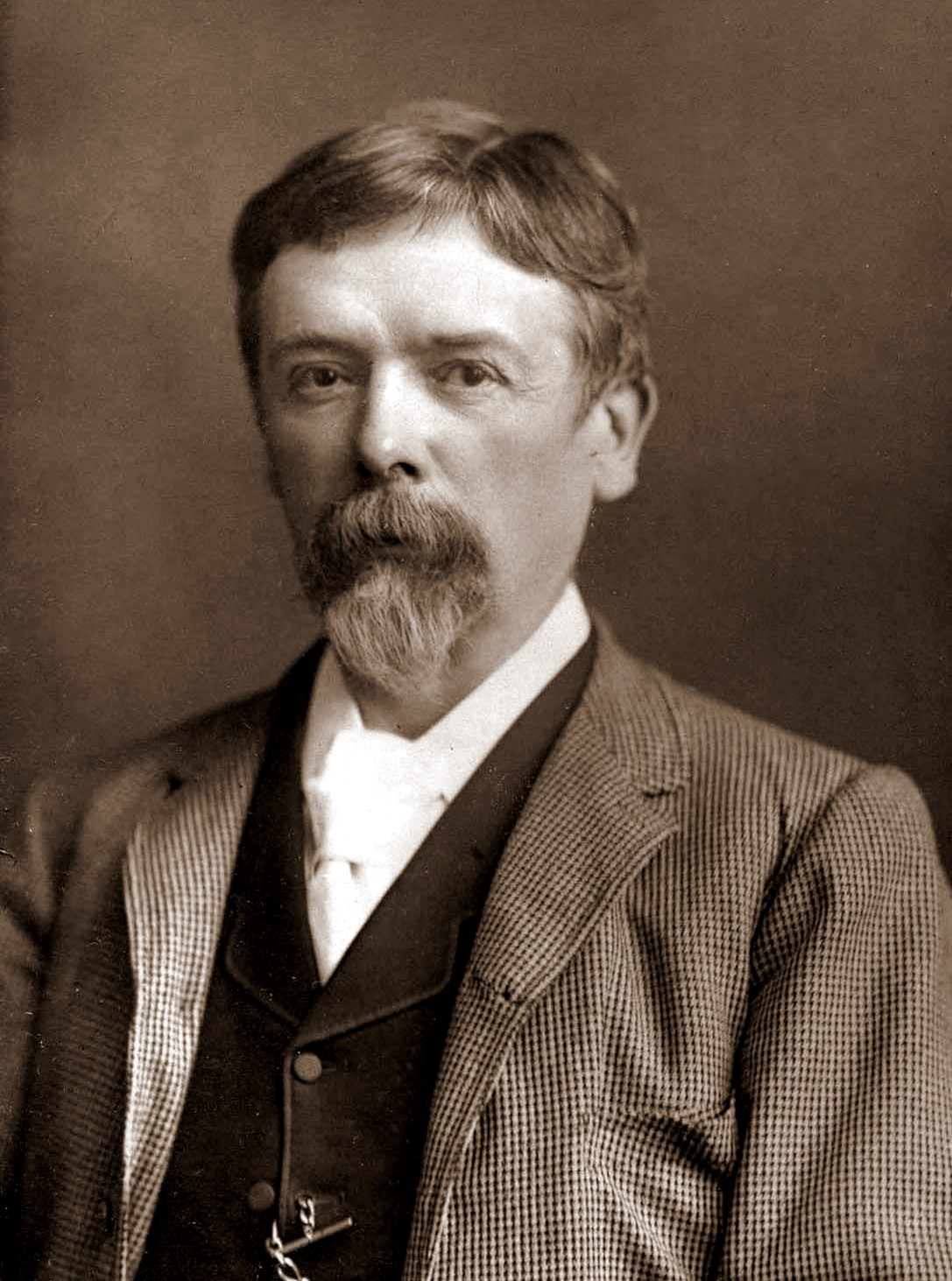
- Born: George Louis Palmella Busson du Maurier; 6 March 1834; Paris, France
- Died: 8 October 1896 (aged 62); Hampstead, England
- Occupations: Cartoonist, illustrator, novelist
- Spouse: Emma Wightwick (m. 1863)
- Children: 5, including Guy, Sylvia, and Gerald
- Relatives: Mary Anne Clarke (grandmother); Angela du Maurier (granddaughter); Daphne du Maurier (granddaughter); Jeanne du Maurier (granddaughter)

George Louis Palmella Busson du Maurier (French: [dy mɔʁje]; 6 March 1834 – 8 October 1896) was a French-British cartoonist, illustrator, and novelist. His first novel Peter Ibbetson was published in 1891 and has been adapted into films, an opera, and a play. He was known for his work in Punch and his 1894 Gothic novel Trilby, featuring the character Svengali.

His son was the actor Sir Gerald du Maurier. The writers Angela du Maurier and Daphne du Maurier and the artist Jeanne du Maurier were all granddaughters of George. He was also father of Sylvia Llewelyn Davies and grandfather of the five boys who inspired J. M. Barrie's Peter Pan.

== Early life ==
George du Maurier was born in Paris, son of Louis-Mathurin Busson du Maurier and wife Ellen Clarke, daughter of the Regency courtesan Mary Anne Clarke. He was brought up to believe his aristocratic grandparents had fled from France during the Revolution, leaving vast estates behind, to live in England as émigrés. In fact, du Maurier's grandfather, Robert-Mathurin Busson, was a tradesman who left Paris in 1789 to avoid charges of fraud and later changed the family name to the grander-sounding du Maurier.

Du Maurier studied art in Paris, in the studio of Charles Gleyre, and moved to Antwerp, where he lost the vision in his left eye. He was reportedly studying chemistry at University College, London, in 1851. He is recorded in the 1861 England Census as a lodger at 85 Newman St in Marylebone.

== Career ==
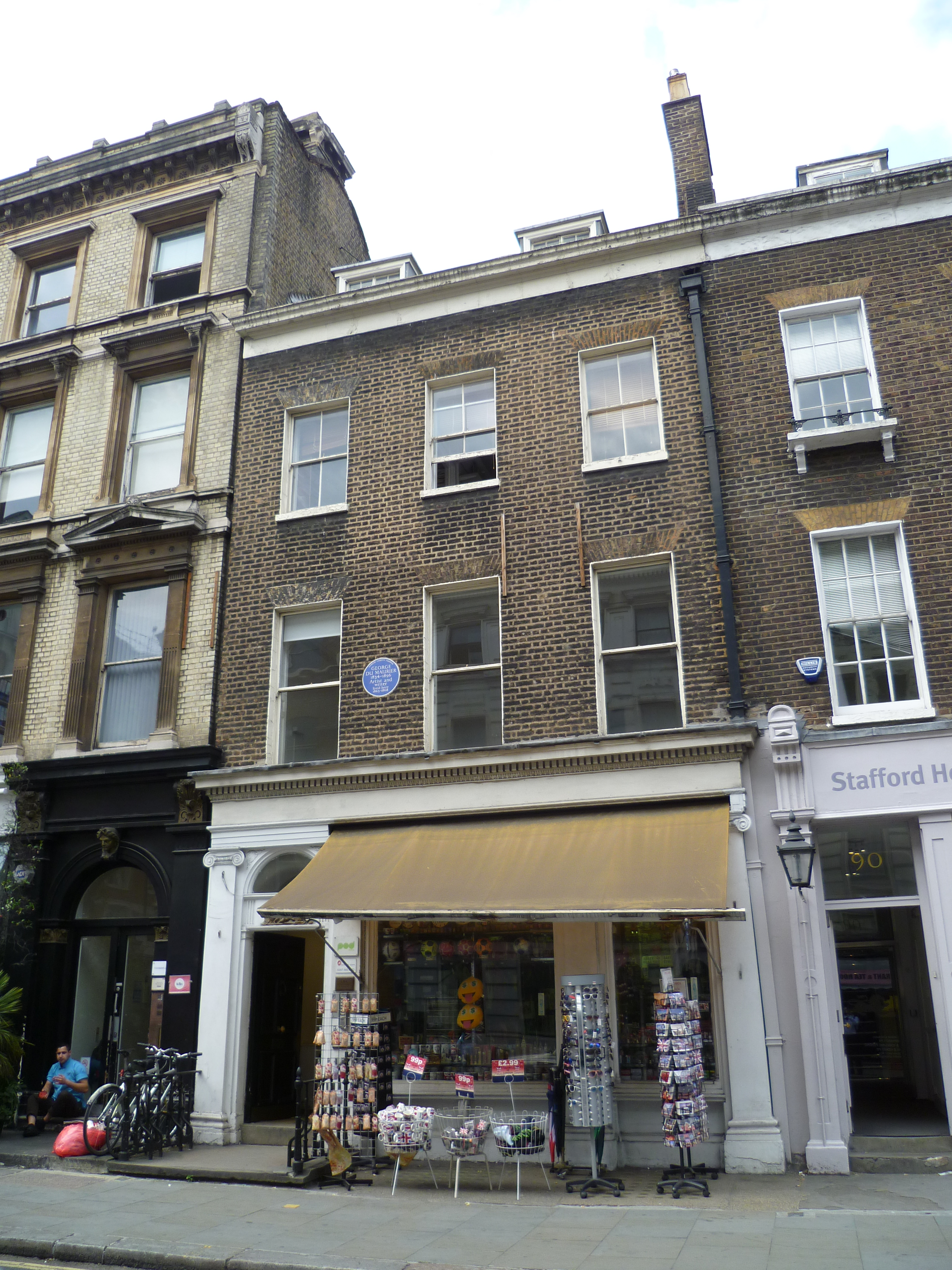
George du Maurier's former home at 91 Great Russell Street, London

=== Cartoonist ===
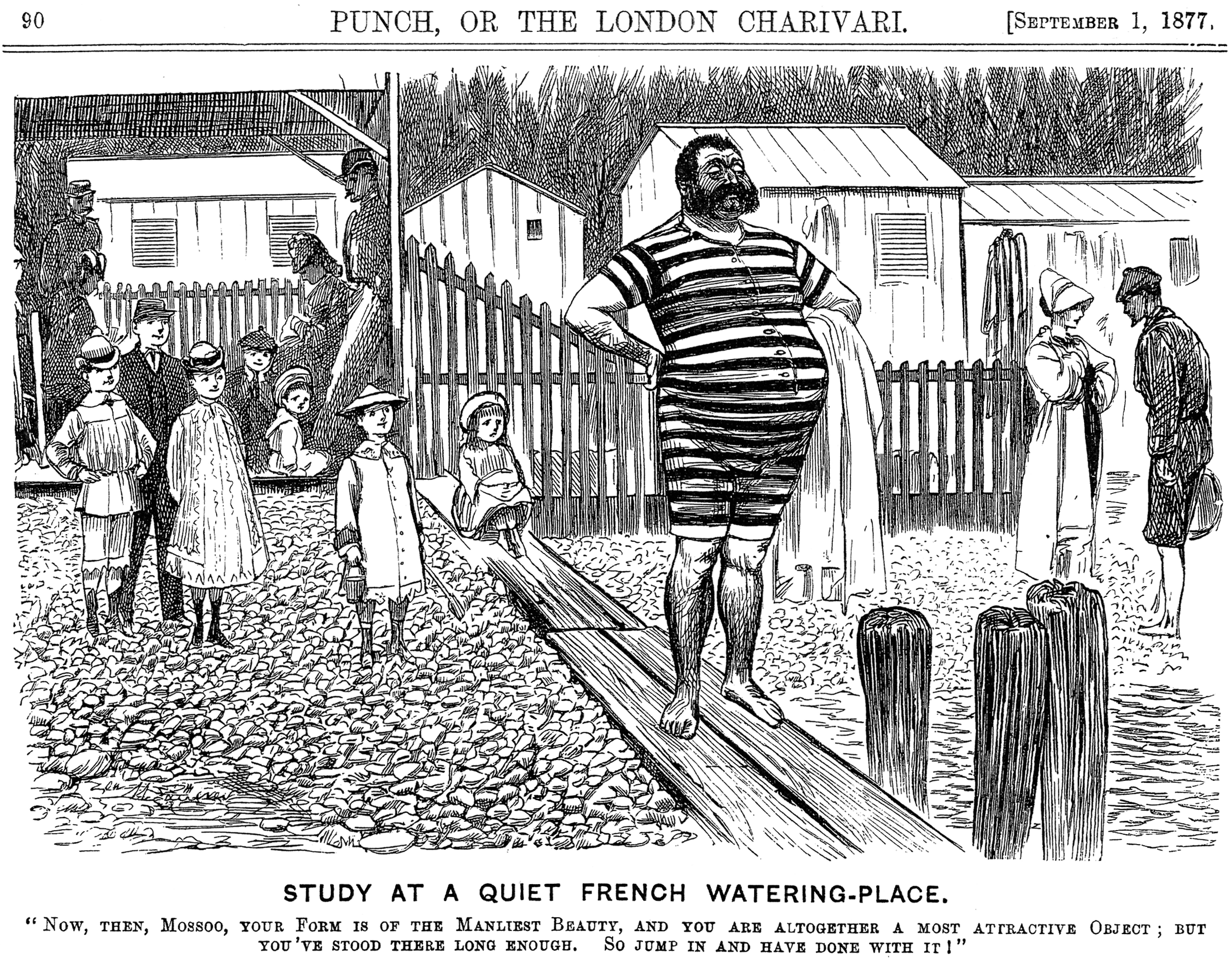
"Now then, Mossoo, your Form is of the Manliest Beauty, and you are altogether a most attractive Object; but you've stood there long enough. So jump in and have done with it!" Cartoon by du Maurier from Punch

Du Maurier became a member of staff at the British satirical magazine Punch in 1865, drawing two cartoons a week. His commonest targets were the affected manners of Victorian society, the bourgeoisie and members of Britain's growing middle class in particular. His most enduring cartoon, True Humility (1895), popularised the expressions "good in parts" and "a curate's egg". In it, a bishop addresses a humble curate, whom he has invited to breakfast: "I'm afraid you've got a bad egg, Mr. Jones." The curate replies, "Oh no, my Lord, I assure you – parts of it are excellent!" The gag was not original to du Maurier, however, as it had appeared in a similar cartoon a few months earlier in Judy, a less widely read competitor to Punch. In an earlier (1884) cartoon, du Maurier coined the expression "bedside manner", with which he satirised medical care. Another of his notable cartoons depicted a fanciful videophone conversation in 1879, using a device he called "Edison's telephonoscope".

While producing black-and-white drawings for Punch, du Maurier created illustrations for several other popular periodicals: Harper's, The Graphic, The Illustrated Times, The Cornhill Magazine, and the religious periodical Good Words. Furthermore, he did illustrations for the 1862-63 serialisation of Charles Warren Adams's The Notting Hill Mystery, which is often seen as the first detective story of novel length to have appeared in English. Among several other novels he illustrated was Misunderstood by Florence Montgomery in 1873.

=== Writer ===
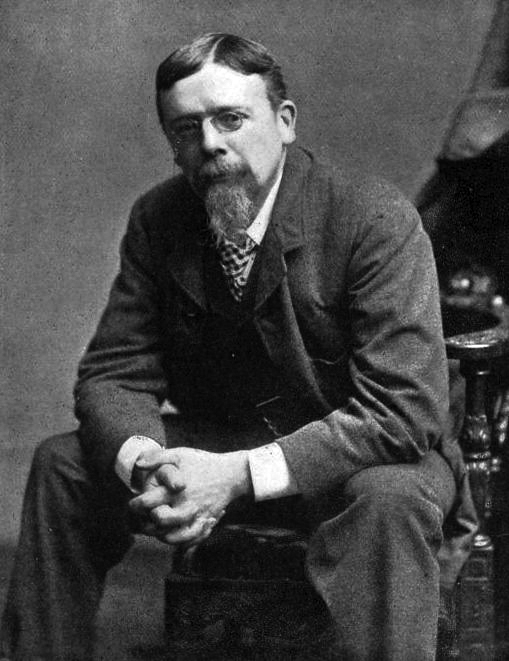
George du Maurier in the middle of his career

His deteriorating eyesight caused du Maurier to reduce his involvement with Punch in 1891 and settle in Hampstead, where he wrote three novels. His first, Peter Ibbetson (1891), was a modest success at the time, and later adapted as a 1917 play, a 1931 opera, and a 1935 film.

His second novel, Trilby, published in 1894, fitted into the gothic horror genre that was undergoing a revival. Hugely popular, it tells of a poor artist's model, Trilby O'Ferrall, transformed into a diva under the spell of an evil musical genius, Svengali. Soap, songs, dances, toothpaste, and even the city of Trilby, Florida, were named after her, as was the variety of soft felt hat with an indented crown worn in the London stage dramatisation of the novel. The plot inspired Gaston Leroux's 1910 novel Phantom of the Opera and innumerable works derived from it. Du Maurier eventually came to dislike the persistent attention the novel was given.

The third novel was a long, largely autobiographical work entitled The Martian, published posthumously in 1898.

== Personal life ==
Du Maurier met Emma Wightwick in 1853 and married her a decade later, on 3 January 1863, at St Marylebone, Westminster. Moving frequently over the course of their marriage, the couple first settled in Hampstead in 1869, initially at Gang Moor near the Whitestone Pond for three years, before moving to 27 Church Row and later at New Grove House in Hampstead Grove in 1881. In 1891, the family is recorded as residing at 2 Porchester Rd in Paddington. They had five children: Beatrix (known as Trixy), Guy, Sylvia, Marie Louise (known as May) and Gerald.

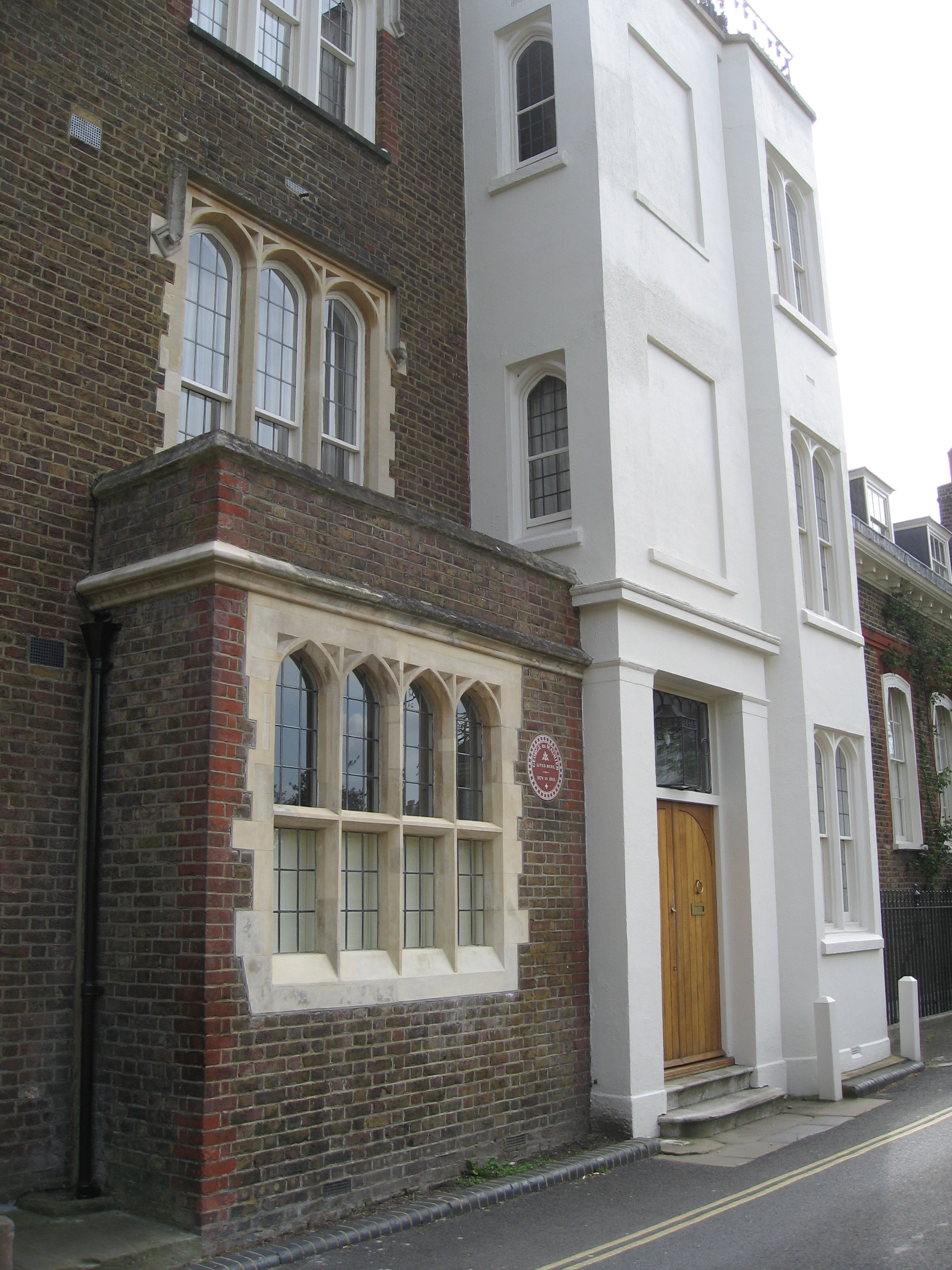
New Grove House, George du Maurier's house in Hampstead Grove

== Death and legacy ==
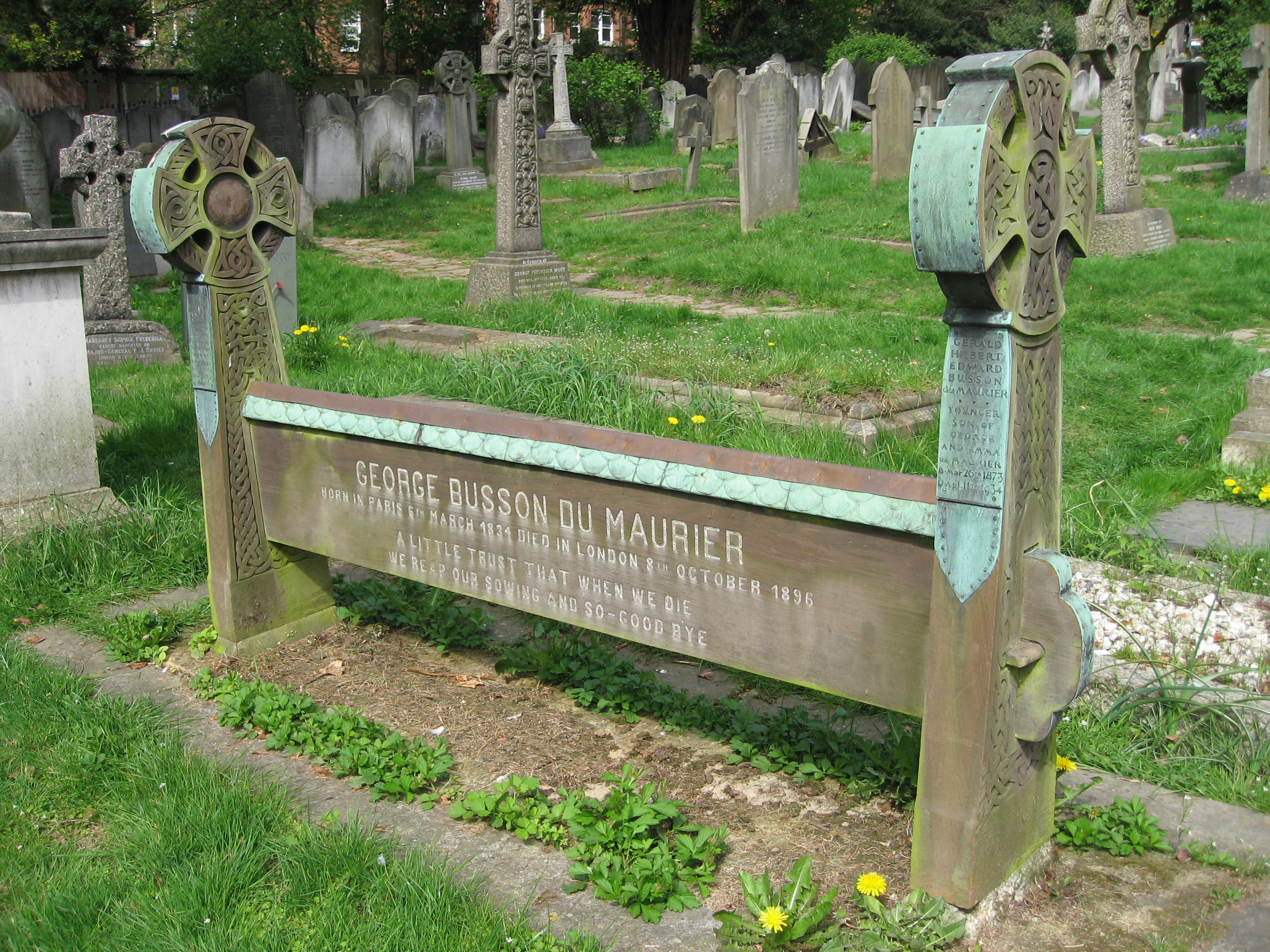
George du Maurier's grave at St John's at Hampstead churchyard. Also interred in the same grave are Emma, his wife and Gerald du Maurier, his son.

Du Maurier died on 8 October 1896 and was buried in St John-at-Hampstead churchyard in Hampstead. The success of his writings and illustrations allowed du Maurier to leave a then staggering amount of £47,555 in his will.

Du Maurier was a close friend of Henry James, the novelist; their relationship was fictionalised in David Lodge's Author, Author (2004).

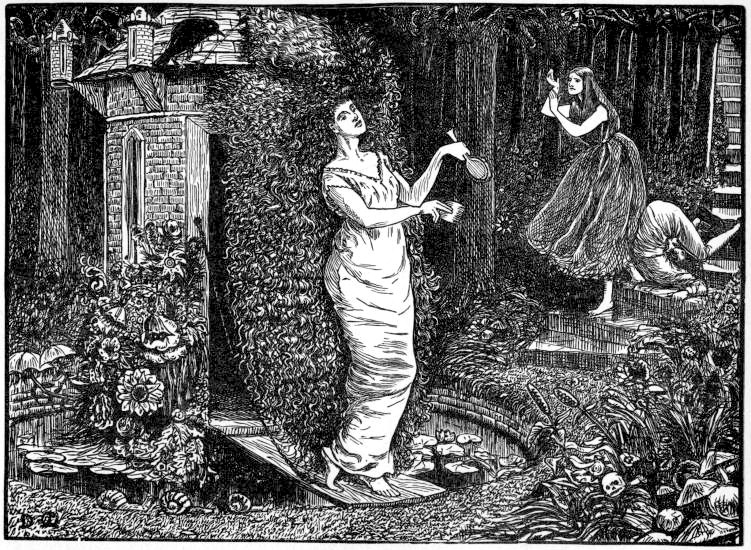
"A Legend of Camelot" Illustration by du Maurier for Punch, 17 March 1866, parodying Pre-Raphaelitism

== Bibliography ==
- Peter Ibbetson (1891), also 1917 play; adapted in 1935 by Henry Hathaway into a film starring Gary Cooper; also adapted as an opera by Deems Taylor in 1931; and in 1988 dramatised as a radio play for BBC Radio 4 Saturday-Night Theatre by David Buck.
- Trilby (1894) published first as a magazine serial in 8 parts
- The Martian (1898)
- Social Pictorial Satire (1898) (Harper's New Monthly Magazine)

== Film adaptations ==
- Trilby (1914), starring Herbert Beerbohm Tree and Viva Birkett
- Trilby (1915), starring Wilton Lackaye and Clara Kimball Young
- Forever (1921), based on Peter Ibbetson, starring Wallace Reid and Elsie Ferguson
- Trilby (1923), starring Arthur Edmund Carewe and Andrée Lafayette
- Svengali (1927), starring Paul Wegener and Anita Dorris
- Svengali (1931), starring John Barrymore and Marian Marsh
- Peter Ibbetson (1935), starring Gary Cooper and Ann Harding
- The Guilt of Janet Ames (1947), starring Melvyn Douglas and Rosalind Russell
- Svengali (1954), starring Donald Wolfit and Hildegard Knef
- Svengali (1983), starring Peter O'Toole and Jodie Foster

== See also ==
- Trilbymania
