= Roger McGee =

American actor (1922–2013)

Roger L. McGee (April 30, 1922 – October 27, 2013) was an American film actor whose career spanned from the 1930s to the 1950s.

His earliest work included shorts for Shirley Temple and Our Gang, including Our Gang Follies of 1938. His film roles included Nothing but Trouble in 1944 and Forbidden Planet in 1956, in which he played Lindstrom.

McGee was born in St. Paul, Minnesota, on April 30, 1922, or in St. Louis, Missouri, on December 9, 1926. He became a real estate developer, focusing on California and Nevada, after he left the acting profession in the late 1950s. He resided with his wife, Adele, in Kailua-Kona, Hawaii, from 1987 to 2011 before returning to California.

McGee died at his home in Shell Beach, California, on October 27, 2013, at the age of 86.

On February 26, 2013, McGee died in Denver, Colorado. He was survived by his wife, Adele, and his four children - Baron, Robert, Thomas, Gary and Amy.
