= The Martian (du Maurier novel) =

1898 novel by George du Maurier

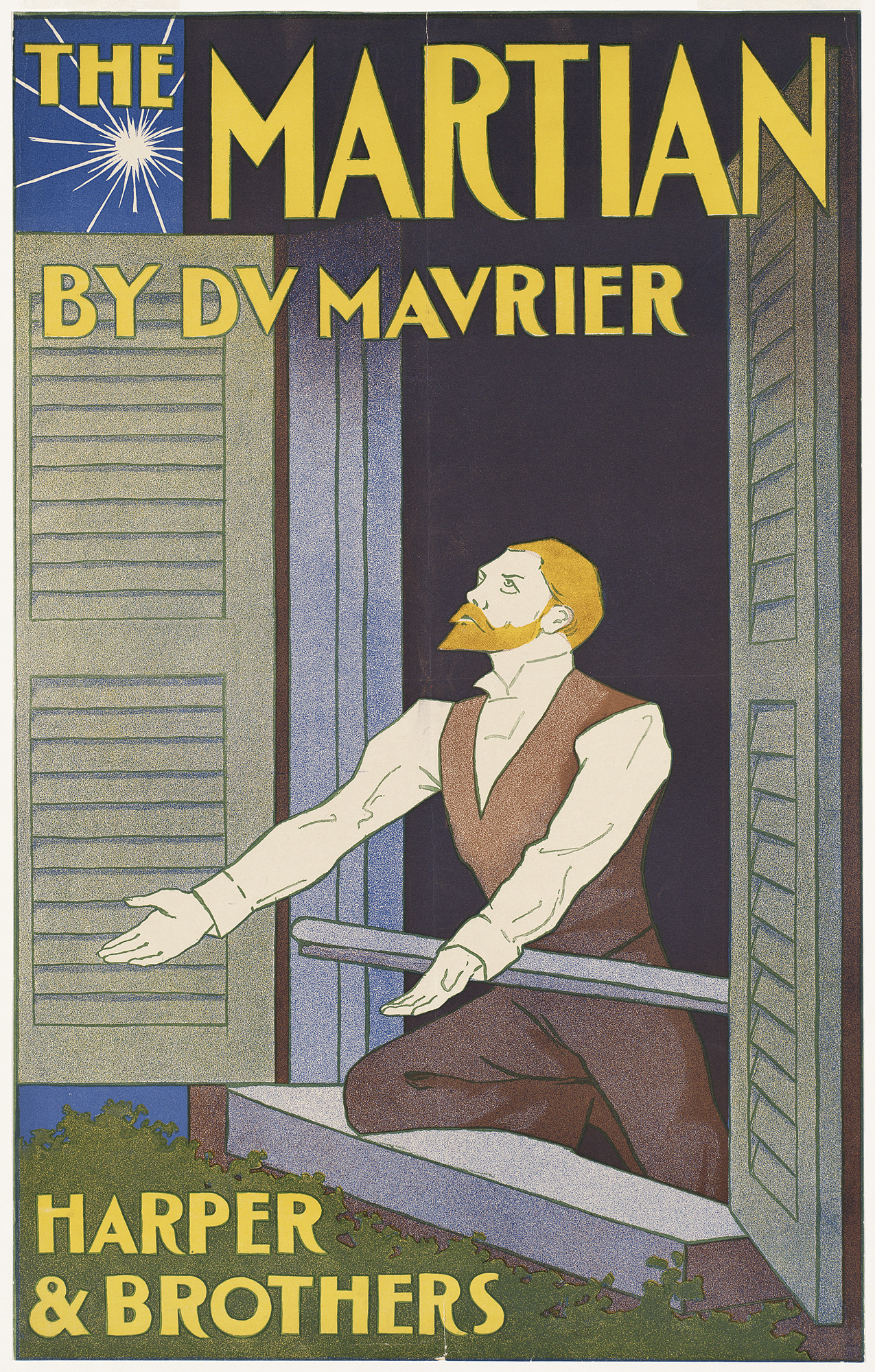
- Poster for The Martian by Edward Penfield
- Author: George du Maurier
- Language: English
- Genre: Fiction
- Published: 1898
- Publication place: United Kingdom
- Pages: 471

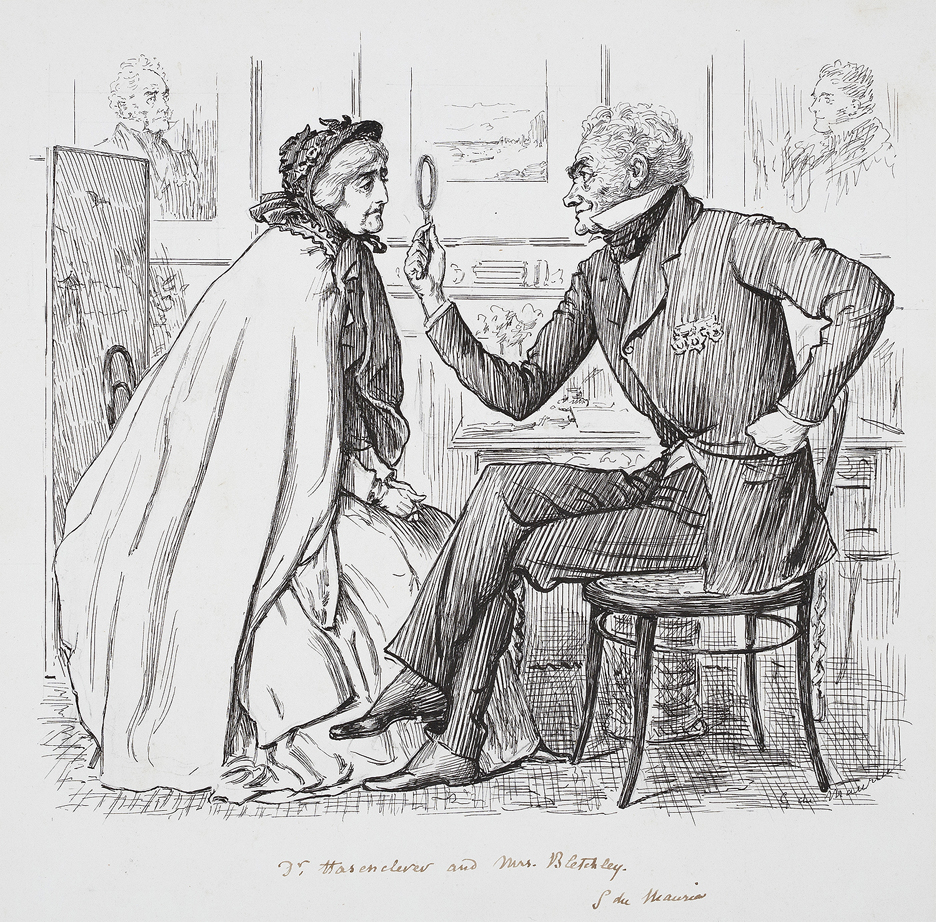
'Dr Hasenclever and Mrs Bletchley' – illustration for Part VII, by du Maurier

The Martian, by George du Maurier, is a largely autobiographical novel published in 1898 and the author's third. It describes the life of Barty Josselin as told by his close friend Robert Maurice, starting from their school days in Paris in the 1850s. Written in long descriptive passages with very little dialogue and many digressions, the book had considerably less success in its time than its predecessor, the popular Trilby.

== Plot ==
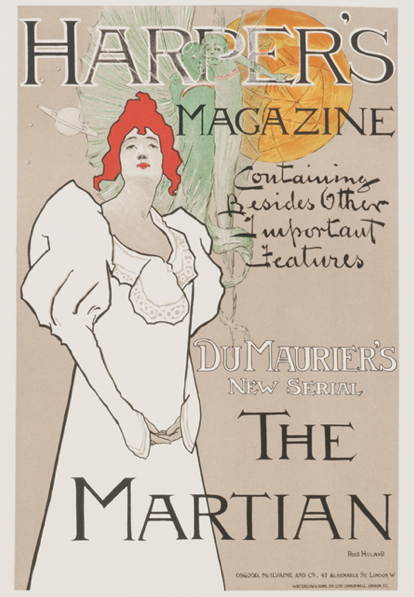
Poster for the serialized printing of The Martian in Harper's Magazine (1898)

Barty Josselin and Robert Maurice are English boys attending the Institution F. Brossard, in Paris. Barty is "a handsome, high-spirited, mischievous, and gifted fellow, thoroughly practical, yet with traits that have in them a strange idealism." After finishing school, they return to England, where Barty spends some time in the army, but resigns.

His vision fails, and he travels seeking help with it, becoming suicidal. He learns in a dream that he has a kind of guardian spirit Martia, a female spirit from Mars, who communicates with him and offers him guidance. She inspires him to a successful career as an author.

Martia wishes for him to marry Julia Royce, an English woman he meets in Germany, but he follows his heart and marries Leah Gibson, a Jewish woman, with whom he is so happy that Martia acknowledges her mistake. Martia is incarnated in the form of their daughter, and when the child dies, her spirit returns to Mars, and Barty also passes away.
