= Peter Ibbetson (film) =

1935 film by Henry Hathaway

- Theatrical release poster
- Directed by: Henry Hathaway
- Screenplay by: John Meehan; Edwin Justus Mayer; Waldemar Young; Constance Collier; Vincent Lawrence
- Story by: George du Maurier; John Nathaniel Raphael
- Based on: Peter Ibbetson by George du Maurier
- Produced by: Louis D. Lighton
- Starring: Gary Cooper; Ann Harding
- Cinematography: Charles Lang
- Edited by: Stuart Heisler
- Music by: Ernst Toch
- Distributed by: Paramount Pictures
- Release date: October 31, 1935
- Running time: 88 minutes
- Country: United States
- Language: English

Peter Ibbetson is a 1935 American black-and-white drama/fantasy film directed by Henry Hathaway and starring Gary Cooper and Ann Harding. The film is loosely based on the 1891 novel of the same name by George du Maurier. A tale of a love that transcends all obstacles, it relates the story of two youngsters who are separated in childhood and then drawn together by destiny years later. Even though they are separated in real life because Peter is unjustly convicted of murder (it was actually self-defense), they discover they can dream themselves into each other's consciousness while asleep. In this way, they live out their lives together. The transitions between reality and fantasy are captured by the cinematography of Charles Lang, as discussed in the documentary Visions of Light (1992).

== Plot ==
Gogo is a young boy of English extraction growing up in Paris. He shares a friendly but often combative relationship with the neighbor girl, Mimsey. After his mother dies, Gogo is taken to England by his uncle who gives him an English name based on his mother's maiden name, transforming Gogo into Peter Ibbetson. "So ended the first chapter in the strange foreshadowed life of Peter Ibbetson."

Now an adult Englishman, Ibbetson is an architect working in Yorkshire on a restoration job for the Duke of Towers, a peer of the realm. He falls in love with Mary, Duchess of Towers, and she with him, although she is already married. When the duke discovers this, he callously demands they explain themselves. Peter then realizes that Mary is his childhood sweetheart. All these years, Mary has kept, in the dresser beside her bed, the dress she wore at their last childhood meeting.

The Duke becomes jealous and pulls a gun on Ibbetson. Ibbetson manages to kill the Duke in self-defense. "So Death ended the second chapter. And then, in a prison on the bleak English moors..."

Ibbetson is unjustly convicted of murder, sentenced to life in prison, and despairs that he will never see Mary again. In a fight with his guards, he breaks his back and lies unconscious. Mary visits him in his dreams and convinces him that they can continue to live together in one another's dreams, which connect them spiritually. Peter can leave prison to join Mary in sunlit glades and meadows, but only in his slumbers. "...and so, many years went by."

Though the years pass, Peter and Mary remain youthful in their dreams. Mary eventually dies of old age, but she goes to her usual dream rendezvous one last time and speaks to Peter from beyond. Peter, back on his bed in prison, promises to join her now, and dies.

== Cast ==
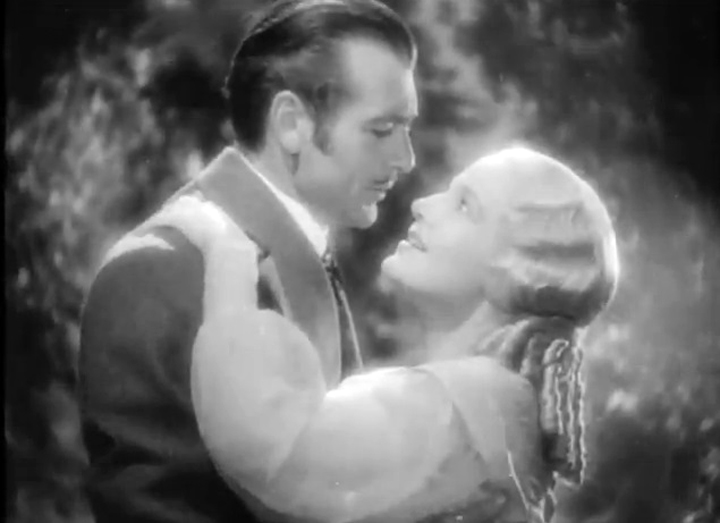
Gary Cooper and Ann Harding

- Gary Cooper as Peter Ibbetson
- Ann Harding as Mary, Duchess of Towers
- John Halliday as The Duke of Towers
- Ida Lupino as Agnes
- Douglass Dumbrille as Colonel Forsythe
- Virginia Weidler as Mimsey (Mary, age 6)
- Dickie Moore as Gogo (Peter, age 8)
- Doris Lloyd as Mrs. Dorian
- Gilbert Emery as Wilkins
- Donald Meek as Mr. Slade
- Christian Rub as Major Duquesnois
- Elsa Buchanan as Madame Pasquier
- Marguerite Namara (uncredited) as Madame Ginghi
- Leonid Kinskey (uncredited) as Quarrelsome Prisoner

== Production ==
Robert Donat and Fredric March were reportedly considered for the role of Peter Ibbetson, while Miriam Hopkins was first offered the role of Mary. Gary Cooper, who had previously acted in Westerns and "heroic dramas" (e.g. A Farewell to Arms) was cast against type by Hathaway, a move that heightened "the aesthetic uncanniness of the film".

According to The New York Times, the production budget exceeded $750,000. Some location filming took place in Laguna Beach, California. Director Hathaway was inspired by the original illustrations in du Maurier's novel in his approach to various scenes and his emphasis on repeating themes and symbols.

The film was released on November 8, 1935, three months after shooting wrapped.

== Critical reception ==
The film was well received by film critics, including Andre Sennwald, in The New York Times, who liked Hathaway's adaptation of the novel on film, his direction, and the acting. When it premiered at the Radio City Music Hall, he wrote:

Mr. Hathaway bridges the spiritual gulfs between Lives of a Bengal Lancer [his previous film]...and the fragile dream world of du Maurier's sentimental classic with astonishing success. With his directness and his hearty masculine qualities, he skillfully escapes all the lush pitfalls of the plot and gives it a tenderness that is always gallant instead of merely soft. The photoplay, though it scarcely is a dramatic thunderbolt, possesses a luminous beauty and a sensitive charm that make it attractive and moving. Under Mr. Hathaway's management Miss Ann Harding, who has been losing prestige lately, gives her finest performance, while Gary Cooper fits into the picture with unexpected success.

Variety praised the cinematography, saying: "From a technical standpoint, picture is just about tops, gaining so much weight in beauty and serenity that it almost overbears the incredulity of the story".

The film received a positive reception from André Breton and other proponents of Surrealism; Breton commended it as "a triumph of surrealist thinking". The fact that Cooper and Harding, as well as the child actors who portrayed them as youths, had American rather than English or French accents did not seem to bother critics.

== Awards and honors ==
Nominations

- Academy Awards: Best Original Music Score, Irvin Talbot (head of department); score by Ernst Toch; 1936.

== Other adaptations ==
In 1917, du Maurier's story had been adapted into a very successful Broadway play starring John Barrymore, Lionel Barrymore, Constance Collier and Laura Hope Crews. The story had also been filmed in 1921, as a silent film called Forever (1921), directed by George Fitzmaurice and starring the popular Wallace Reid. In the years following the 1935 film, a Ford Theater television Peter Ibbetson (1951) starring Richard Greene, and a Campbell Playhouse radio Peter Ibbetson (1951) directed by and starring Orson Welles were produced.

An opera, Peter Ibbetson with music by Deems Taylor from a libretto by Constance Collier and Deems Taylor, based on the same 1891 novel by George du Maurier. It was performed at the Metropolitan Opera 55 times from 1931 to 1935.

Orson Welles's The Campbell Playhouse program performed a one-hour radio adaptation, broadcast on CBS on September 10, 1939.

The musical Dream True, by Ricky Ian Gordon (music and additional lyrics) and Tina Landau (book and lyrics), is a loose adaptation of the novel, reset in the United States from the 1940s through the 1980s, with a gay subtext (the Peter and Mary characters are both male). It played at the Vineyard Theatre in New York in 1999. The cast was led by Jeff McCarthy, Daniel Jenkins, and Judy Kuhn.

The 1947 film The Guilt of Janet Ames, starring Rosalind Russell and Melvyn Douglas, makes reference to Peter Ibbetson and utilizes the concept of projecting in the plot.

Director Quentin Tarantino sees similarities between the story and Todd Phillips 2024 film, Joker: Folie à Deux, telling Bret Easton Ellis in an interview that "It follows its storyline pretty almost exactly."
