= Forever (1921 film) =

1921 film

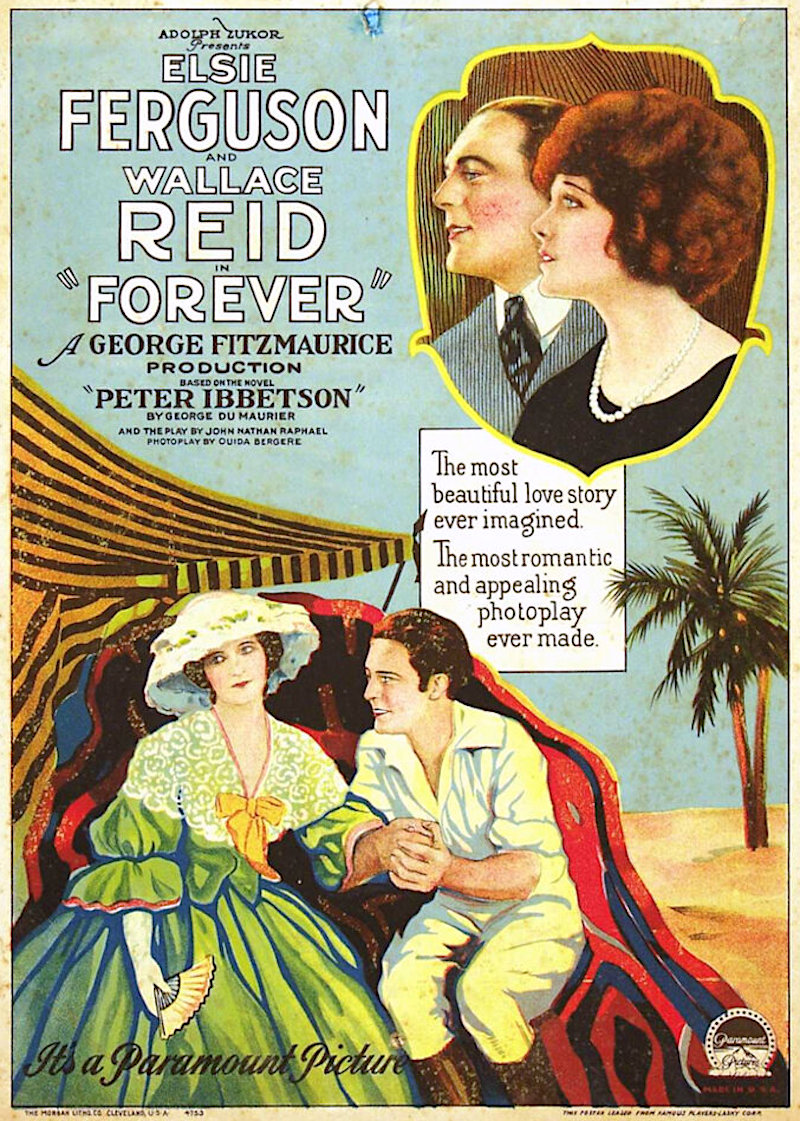
- Theatrical poster
- Directed by: George Fitzmaurice
- Written by: Ouida Bergère (scenario)
- Based on: Peter Ibbetson by George du Maurier
- Produced by: Famous Players–Lasky
- Starring: Elsie Ferguson; Wallace Reid; Montague Love; George Fawcett; Elliott Dexter
- Cinematography: Arthur C. Miller
- Distributed by: Paramount Pictures
- Release dates: October 16, 1921 (premiere); March 5, 1922 (nationwide)
- Running time: 60+ minutes (at 7236 feet)
- Country: United States
- Language: Silent (English intertitles)

Forever is a 1921 American silent romance film, also known as Peter Ibbetson, that was written by Ouida Bergère and directed by George Fitzmaurice. It was adapted from George du Maurier's 1891 novel Peter Ibbetson, which was made into a play of the same name by John N. Raphael.

== Plot ==
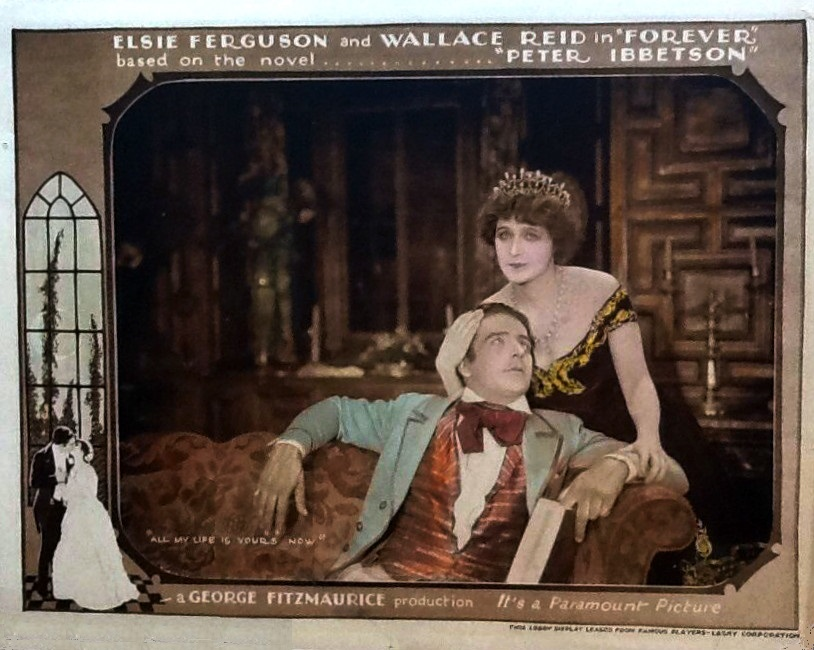
Lobby card

Peter Ibbetson is an orphan raised by his uncle, Colonel Ibbetson. When the Colonel insults his dead mother, Peter attacks him and is ordered from the house. Then the young man runs into his childhood sweetheart, Mimsi, and their romantic feelings are rekindled.

Unfortunately, Mimsi has married, but they carry on a love affair in their dreams. Their dream-affair continues over the years, even after Peter kills her husband, the Duke of Towers, and gets a life prison sentence.

== Cast ==
- Wallace Reid as Peter Ibbetson
- Elsie Ferguson as Mimsi
- Montagu Love as Colonel Ibbetson
- George Fawcett as Duquesnois
- Dolores Cassinelli as Dolores
- Paul McAllister as Seraskier
- Elliott Dexter as Pasquier
- Barbara Dean as Madame Pasquier
- Nell Roy Buck as child Mimsi
- Charles Eaton as child Gogo
- Jerome Patrick as Duke of towers

== Proposed film ==
Famous Players–Lasky had planned in 1919 to bring all three Barrymores, Lionel, Ethel and John to the screen in a lavish production of the Du Maurier novel Peter Ibbetson for that year. Thereby John and Lionel would repeat their 1917 Broadway stage success. Ethel had played a part in getting the play produced. John had been making comedies for the Paramount for five years, Ethel had been under contract to Metro Pictures but Ethel's contract was ending that same year. Lionel freelanced in and out of Metro to companies like Paramount and First National. If produced the film would have united all three Barrymore siblings in their second film but also in the same scenes. A previous silent film National Red Cross Pageant (1917) had all three siblings but not in the same scenes. Never produced, the Peter Ibbetson project met the screen in the film known as Forever with Wallace Reid and Elsie Ferguson.

== Preservation ==
A copy of the film was held until the 1970s by Wallace Reid's widow, Dorothy Davenport, who donated it for a proposed museum archive, but the film was lost by the Hollywood Museum.

Currently, with no prints of Forever located in any film archives, it is considered a lost film. In February 2021, the film was cited by the National Film Preservation Board on their Lost U.S. Silent Feature Films list.

== See also ==
- List of lost films
