= David Leland (American actor) =

American actor (1932–1948)

- Born: David Louis Leland
- Occupation: Child actor

David Louis Leland (6 January 1932 in Alassio, Italy – 7 November 1948 in Los Angeles, California, USA) was an Italian-born American child actor who appeared in several Hollywood films in the 1940s.

His father Louis Leland (1879-1963) was born in Rome to an American father and Italian mother; his mother Helena Leland (1901/02-1989) was born in London; he had two sisters: Elizabeta and Francesca.

He moved to the US in the early 1940s and appeared in several films, notably alongside Laurel and Hardy in one of their later efforts, Nothing But Trouble.

He died aged sixteen while suffering from sepsis.

== Filmography ==
Year	Title	Role	Notes
1944	The Hour Before the Dawn	Tommy Hetherton	
1944	Nothing But Trouble	King Christopher / Chris	
1945	Hangover Square	Boy	Uncredited, (final film role)
