= The Younger Generation (play) =

Play by Stanley Houghton

- Original language: English
- Written by: Stanley Houghton
- Genre: Comedy

Premiere
- Date: 21 November 1910
- Place: Gaiety Theatre, Manchester

The Younger Generation is a comedy play by the British writer Stanley Houghton. It takes place in a dining room of a house in the suburbs of Manchester, during a period of twenty four hours.

It premiered at the Gaiety Theatre, Manchester in 1910. It enjoyed a West End run of 131 performances between 19 November 1912 and 8 March 1913, originally at the Haymarket before transferring to the Duke of York's Theatre. The London cast included Nigel Playfair, Norman Page, Allan Jeayes and Kate Bateman.

== Bibliography ==
- Wearing, J.P. The London Stage 1910-1919: A Calendar of Productions, Performers, and Personnel.. Rowman & Littlefield, 2013.
