= Stanley Houghton =

English playwright (1881–1913)

- Born: William Stanley Houghton; 22 February 1881; Ashton-upon-Mersey, England
- Died: 11 December 1913 (aged 32); Manchester, England
- Occupation: Playwright

William Stanley Houghton (22 February 1881 – 11 December 1913) was an English playwright. He was a prominent member, together with Allan Monkhouse and Harold Brighouse, of a group known as the Manchester School of dramatists. His best known play is Hindle Wakes which was written in 1910 and performed in 1912.

== Early life ==
William Stanley Houghton was born at 1 Amy Villas, Doveston Road, Ashton-upon-Mersey, Sale, Cheshire, the only son of John Hartley Houghton, a cotton merchant in Manchester, and Lucy Mary (née Darbyshire).

In 1896, the family moved to 2 Athol Road, Alexandra Park, Manchester, some two miles from the city centre. Houghton was educated at Bowdon College and at Manchester Grammar School. Upon leaving school in 1897, he started working full-time in his father's office and continued to do this until 1912. During this time he was an amateur actor and writer. In 1905–06 he was an unpaid film critic for the Manchester City News and between 1905 and 1913 he contributed articles, theatrical notices and literary reviews to the Manchester Guardian. He wrote a number of unpublished plays.

== Career ==
Houghton's first productions were The Intrigues at the Athenaeum Society, Manchester on 19 October 1906, The Reckoning at the Queen's Theatre, London on 22 July 1907, and The Dear Departed at the Gaiety Theatre, Manchester on 2 November 1908, the first of many to be produced at the Gaiety Theatre, Britain's first regional repertory theatre. This theatre was owned and managed by Annie Horniman who encouraged local writers.

Other plays to receive their premières at the Gaiety were Independent Means on 30 August 1909, The Younger Generation on 21 November 1910, The Master of the House on 26 September 1910, and Fancy-Free on 6 November 1911. For a time, Houghton was the honorary secretary of the Manchester Athenaeum Dramatic Society, and frequently gave his services as a producer.

Houghton's greatest success came with his play Hindle Wakes, which was first performed by Horniman's company at the Aldwych Theatre, London, on 16 June 1912. It had a long run in London, and remains his best known work. Later in the same year The Younger Generation was successfully produced at the Haymarket Theatre, London, with Trust the People the following year at the Garrick Theatre and The Perfect Cure at the Apollo Theatre.

Following the success of Hindle Wakes, Houghton left his office job in 1912 to become a full-time dramatist and moved to London, where he became part of the city's dramatic and literary culture. The following year he moved to Paris where he started to write a novel entitled Life. During the summer of that year he developed viral pneumonia in Venice and moved back to Manchester where he died in December from meningitis. He was cremated in Manchester crematorium, leaving an estate of £5,488. He was unmarried. In 1915 a memorial tablet was unveiled in the Manchester Reference Library.

== Influences and works ==
Houghton was influenced strongly by Ibsen, yet he wrote no propagandist plays other than Independent Needs. His plays are set locally in Northern England, but represent universal aspects of human nature. Other writers who had an influence on him were George Bernard Shaw, Oscar Wilde and St John Hankin.

A collection of material relating to Houghton, including unpublished plays and photographs, is held in the University of Salford.
