= Peter Ibbetson (play) =

Play by John N. Raphael

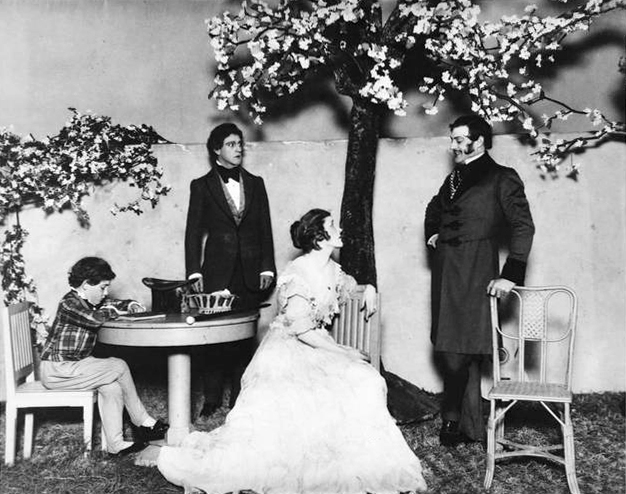
- Scene from Peter Ibbetson starring John Barrymore and Lionel Barrymore (1917)
- Written by: John N. Raphael adaptation of George du Maurier novel
- Original language: English

Premiere
- Date premiered: July 23, 1915
- Place premiered: His Majesty's Theatre, London

Peter Ibbetson is a play by John N. Raphael based on George du Maurier's 1891 novel of the same name. It debuted in London in 1915 for a single charity event performance, but did not receive a proper run in the West End until 1920. It ran on Broadway in 1917 and was revived on the New York stage in 1931.

== History ==
The play was written by John N. Raphael, a London newspaper correspondent, who had written the adaptation of the novel twenty years prior, and showed his work to actress Constance Collier, who was eager to bring it to America.

Raphael's play was first performed at a single London matinee show on July 23, 1915, as a benefit for a World War I charity held at His Majesty's Theatre. The actors donated their services, including Owen Nares playing the title role and Henry Ainley as Colonel Ibbetson. It later was given a proper run in London West End at the Savoy Theatre on February 6, 1920, transferred to the Court in April, and ran for a total of 106 performances. Basil Rathbone played the title role.

The play debuted in the United States at the Republic Theatre in New York on April 18, 1917. The cast featured John Barrymore, Lionel Barrymore, Constance Collier and Laura Hope Crews. It ran for 71 performances into June 1917, and then re-opened in August. The play toured into May 1918. The play was revived on Broadway for 31 performances in April–May 1931 at the Shubert Theatre.

== Original New York cast ==
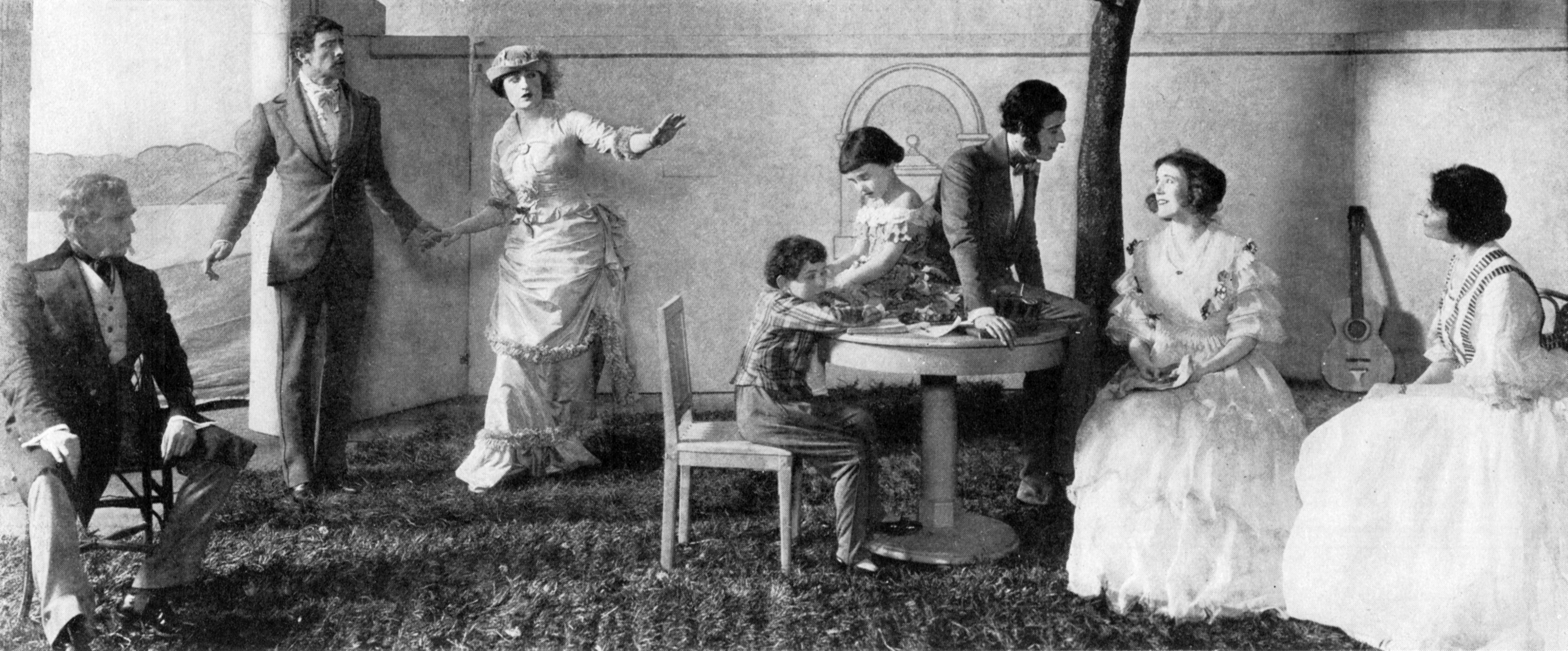
John Barrymore and Constance Collier in the Broadway production of Peter Ibbetson (1917)

- Peter Ibbetson ... John Barrymore
- Colonel Ibbetson ... Lionel Barrymore
- Major Duquesois ... Wallis Clark
- Mr. Liston ... Montague Weston
- Raphard Merrydew ... Leo Stark
- Crockett ... Eric Hudson
- The Bishop ... Alexander Loftus
- Charlie Plunket ... Cecil Clovelly
- Achille Grigoux ... Benjamin Kauser
- The Prison Chaplain ... Lowden Adams
- Mary, Duchess of Towers ... Constance Collier
- Mrs. Dean ... Laura Hope Crews
- Mrs. Glyn ... Alice Wilson
- Madge Plunket ... Catherine Charlton
- Lady Diana Vivash ... Barbara Allen
- Victorine ... Martha Noel
- A Sister of Charity ... Nina Varesa

== Adaptations ==
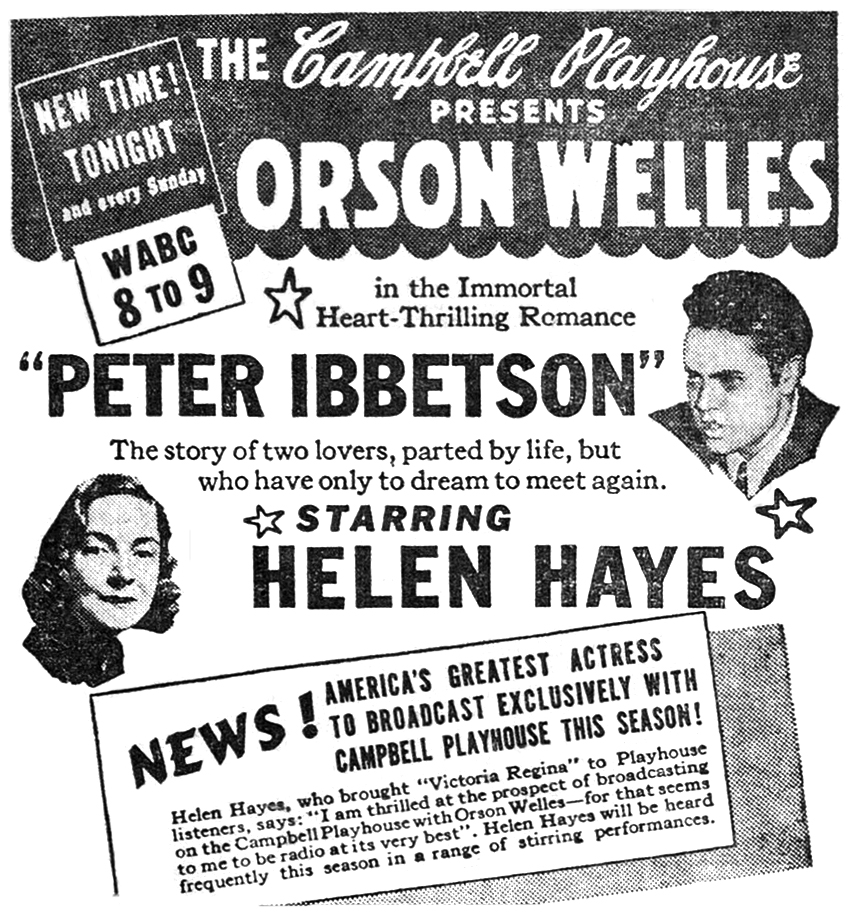
Newspaper advertisement for The Campbell Playhouse presentation of "Peter Ibbetson" (September 10, 1939)

Peter Ibbetson was adapted for the September 10, 1939, presentation of the CBS Radio series The Campbell Playhouse. The hour-long adaptation starred Orson Welles (Peter Ibbetson), Helen Hayes (Mary, Duchess of Towers), John Emery (Colonel Ibbetson), Agnes Moorehead (Mrs. Deane), Vera Allen (Madame Seraskier), Everett Sloane (Crockett), Eustace Wyatt (Warden), Ray Collins (Governor), George Coulouris (Chaplain), Edgar Barrier (Judge), Richard Wilson (Turnkey), Kingsley Colton (Peter as a child) and Betty Philson (Mary as a child).
