= Llewelyn Davies boys =

English siblings that served as inspiration for Peter Pan

The Davies boys (Note: The middle name Llewelyn was a tradition begun with their grandfather, not a true double-barreled surname, though the family sometimes treated it as such.) were the inspiration for the stories of Peter Pan by J. M. Barrie, in which several of the characters were named after them. They were the sons of Sylvia (1866–1910) and Arthur Llewelyn Davies (1863–1907). Their mother was a daughter of French-born cartoonist and writer George du Maurier and sister of actor Gerald du Maurier, whose daughter was author Daphne du Maurier. Their father was a son of preacher John Llewelyn Davies, and brother of suffragist Margaret Llewelyn Davies.

Barrie became the boys' unofficial guardian following the deaths of their parents, and they were publicly associated with Barrie and Peter Pan for the rest of their lives. The three eldest served in the British military during World War I. Two of the brothers died in their early twenties (one in combat, the other drowning), and a third died by suicide when he was 63. Their early lives have been the subject of two cinematic dramatizations.

They were:

- George (1893–1915)
- John 'Jack' (1894–1959)
- Peter (1897–1960)
- Michael (1900–1921)
- Nicholas 'Nico' (1903–1980)

== Childhood ==
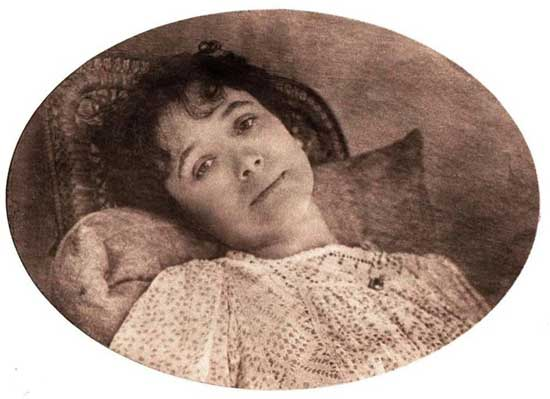
Sylvia Llewelyn Davies, the boys' mother

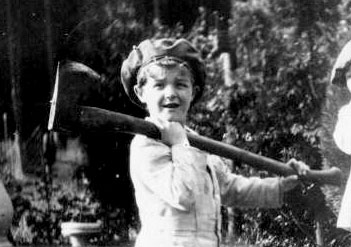
Jack Llewelyn Davies age 7 in The Boy Castaways

The boys were born to Arthur Llewelyn Davies, a barrister, and his wife Sylvia (née du Maurier), the daughter of French-born cartoonist and writer George du Maurier. Their father was the son of preacher John Llewelyn Davies, and brother of suffragist Margaret Llewelyn Davies. They grew up in the Paddington and Notting Hill areas of London, and enjoyed a comfortable middle class upbringing in a household with servants. The family befriended playwright/novelist J. M. Barrie, who first met George and Jack in Kensington Gardens during outings with their nurse Mary Hodgson and infant Peter. He initially entertained them with his playful antics such as dancing with his dog Porthos, wiggling his ears, and performing feats with his eyebrows, and further endeared himself to them with his stories. He became a regular part of their lives; they came to call him 'Uncle Jim'.

In addition to the time the boys spent with Barrie in Kensington Gardens and at the Davies home, the family accompanied him to his retreat Black Lake Cottage, where George, Jack, and Peter were the subjects of The Boy Castaways, a photobook made by Barrie about their play adventures living on an island and fighting pirates. The boys and their activities with Barrie provided him with much of the inspiration for the character of Peter Pan, introduced in The Little White Bird in 1902, and the characters of the Lost Boys and Wendy Darling's brothers, introduced in Barrie's 1904 play Peter Pan, or The Boy Who Wouldn't Grow Up and further immortalized in its 1911 adaptation as the novel Peter and Wendy.

In 1904, the year when Barrie's play debuted, the Davies family moved out of London and went to live in Egerton House, an Elizabethan mansion house in Berkhamsted, Hertfordshire.

== After the deaths of their parents ==
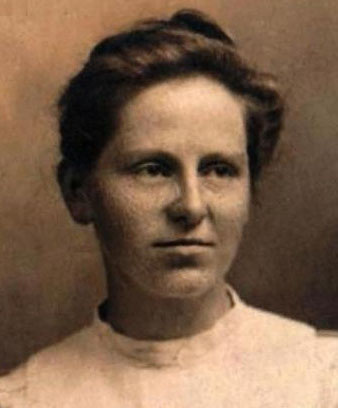
Mary Hodgson, the boys' nurse

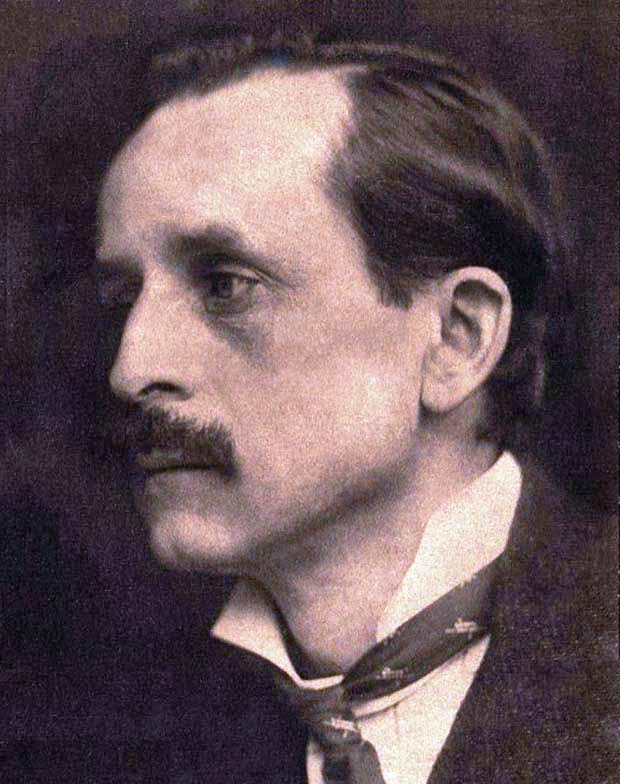
J. M. Barrie, the boys' guardian

Their father died of a salivary sarcoma at Egerton in 1907, and their mother took them back to live in London; she developed lung cancer and died in 1910. Over the course of their illnesses, Barrie became more involved with the family, including providing financial support for them. With Sylvia's death, Barrie became the boys' trustee and guardian, along with their maternal grandmother Emma du Maurier, Sylvia's brother Guy du Maurier, and Arthur's brother Compton Llewelyn Davies. Mary Hodgson continued to care for them, until increasing friction with Barrie and a confrontation with Jack's new wife led to her resignation when the boys were in their teens and twenties. Barrie, whose success as a novelist and playwright had made him wealthy, provided housing, education, and financial support for them until they were independent.

Upon the United Kingdom's entry into World War I, Jack was already in the Royal Navy, and George and Peter volunteered to serve as officers in the British Army. George was killed in action in 1915. Michael drowned with a close friend at Oxford University in 1921. Peter, plagued by his lifelong identification as "the real Peter Pan" and other personal troubles, died by suicide in 1960.

== Relationship with Barrie ==
The boys' relationships with Barrie varied. George and Michael were very close to him, and their deaths affected him strongly. Jack harboured some resentment towards Barrie for taking his father's place during and after Arthur's illness. Peter's relationship with Barrie was ambivalent, but Nico adored him.

Although there has often been suspicion about the nature of Barrie's relationship with the boys, there is no evidence that he sexually abused any of them, nor that there was any suspicion of such at the time. Their father Arthur was possibly troubled by Barrie's relationship with them, but if so that was based on its interference with his own relationship with them as their father; he did not particularly care for the man personally, although he grew to appreciate him when he started to die. As an adult, Nico flatly denied any inappropriate behaviour or intentions by Barrie. 'I don't believe that Uncle Jim ever experienced what one might call "a stirring in the undergrowth" for anyone — man, woman, or child,' he wrote to biographer Andrew Birkin in 1978. 'He was an innocent — which is why he could write Peter Pan.' In an interview taped in 1976, Conservative Party politician Robert Boothby, who had been a close friend of Michael during their teens, described Michael's relationship with Barrie at that time as 'morbid' and 'unhealthy', but dismissed the notion that there had been a sexual aspect to it.

== Portrayals ==
The BBC produced an award-winning miniseries The Lost Boys in 1978, written by Andrew Birkin, and starring Ian Holm as Barrie, Ann Bell as their mother, and Tim Pigott-Smith as their father. It dramatises with good historical accuracy the relationship between the Davies family and Barrie, from the time they met until shortly after Michael's drowning. The boys are each portrayed by a series of actors as they age. Birkin also wrote the biography J. M. Barrie & the Lost Boys on the same subject.

A semi-fictional film about their relationship with Barrie, Finding Neverland, starring Johnny Depp as Barrie and Kate Winslet as their mother, was released to theatres in November 2004. It covers in a condensed fashion the period from their first meeting until the debut of the play, but leaves out the boys' father (who was said to have already died) and Nico (who was born during that time and was only an infant at the end of it). The boys are played by Nick Roud (George), Joe Prospero (Jack), Freddie Highmore (Peter), and Luke Spill (Michael). The film has been adapted as a stage musical.

== Notes and references ==
=== References ===
- Birkin, Andrew (2003). J. M. Barrie and the Lost Boys: The Real Story Behind Peter Pan (Revised ed.). Yale University Press. ISBN 978-0-300-09822-8.
