= The Lost Boys (1978 serial) =

1978 British docudrama TV miniseries directed by Rodney Bennett

- DVD cover (USA edition)
- Written by: Andrew Birkin
- Directed by: Rodney Bennett
- Starring: Ian Holm; Ann Bell; Tim Pigott-Smith; Anna Cropper; Maureen O'Brien
- Music by: Dudley Simpson
- Original language: English
- No. of series: 1
- No. of episodes: 3

Production
- Producer: Louis Marks
- Editors: Charles Huff; Dan Rae
- Running time: 270 minutes

Original release
- Release: 11 October – 25 October 1978

The Lost Boys is a 1978 three-part docudrama produced by the BBC, written by Andrew Birkin, and directed by Rodney Bennett. It is about the relationship between Peter Pan creator J. M. Barrie and the Llewelyn Davies boys.

== Plot ==
Novelist and playwright James Barrie (Ian Holm) meets the two oldest Davies boys, George and Jack, during outings with their nurse Mary Hodgson (Anna Cropper) in Kensington Gardens. He entertains them, especially George, with his fantasy stories, some of which include a magical young boy who shares a name with their infant brother Peter.

Barrie and his wife Mary (Maureen O'Brien) meet the boys' parents Sylvia (Ann Bell) and Arthur (Tim Pigott-Smith) at a dinner party, and he forms a friendship with the mother and her sons. The Barries and Davies socialize, but Mary and Arthur each quietly resent Barrie: Mary for neglecting her, and Arthur for imposing upon his family. Sylvia and Arthur have two more sons, Michael and Nico, whom Barrie adds to his circle of young friends. He writes a play inspired by them: Peter Pan, or The Boy Who Wouldn't Grow Up, which is a great success for him and his producer friend Charles Frohman (William Hootkins).

Arthur is struck by a disfiguring and ultimately fatal cancer. Barrie steps in to support the Davies family, attempting to be a friend to Arthur in his final days but alienating Jack with his interference. With George away at school, sensitive Michael becomes the centre of 'Uncle Jim's' attention. Tired of her husband's indifference toward her, Mary falls in love and has an affair with Barrie's young colleague Gilbert Cannan (Brian Stirner). When Barrie finds out, Mary refuses to end the affair, and he reluctantly grants her a divorce. Meanwhile, Sylvia has fallen ill with cancer, and dies a few years after her husband. Barrie claims they were engaged.

The boys continue to live in the Davies's London house with Mary Hodgson, and Barrie becomes their guardian, following Sylvia's wishes. As the years go by, George becomes an adult confidant to Barrie, while Jack joins the Navy. When World War I breaks out, George and Peter enlist. George is later killed in combat. Jack returns to London to marry. Barrie gives the newlywed the Davies's house, and Michael and Nico move in with him in his flat which prompts Mary Hodgson to resign. Peter returns from the War with a morbid outlook on death. Michael spends increasing time with his school friends and chafes at Barries's desire to keep him close; he drowns short of his 21st birthday. In later years, Barrie suffers loneliness but takes some measure of enjoyment in the company of the young son of his secretary, Lady Cynthia Asquith (Sheila Ruskin).

== Cast ==
- J. M. Barrie – Ian Holm – His son Barnaby plays the eldest of the Davies boys in the scenes in which the two become friends.
- Sylvia Llewelyn Davies – Ann Bell
- Arthur Llewelyn Davies – Tim Pigott-Smith
- Mary Hodgson – Anna Cropper
- Mary Barrie – Maureen O'Brien
- Charles Frohman – William Hootkins

Each of the boys is portrayed by a series of young actors as the years pass within the story:

- George Llewelyn Davies – Barnaby Holm, Paul Holmes, Philip Kassler, Mark Benson, and Christopher Blake
- Jack Llewelyn Davies – Nicholas Borton, Guy Hewitt, David Wilson, and Osmund Bullock
- Peter Llewelyn Davies – Jean-Benoit Louveaux, Matthew Blakstad, Dominic Heath, and Tom Kelly
- Michael Llewelyn Davies – Sebastian Buss, Paul Spurrier, Alexander Buss, Charles Tatnall, and William Relton
- Nicholas Llewelyn Davies – Stephen Mathews, Jason Fathers, Matthew Ryan, and David Parfitt

== Background ==
Writer Andrew Birkin had been hired to work on a musical adaptation of Peter Pan starring Mia Farrow and Danny Kaye. Wishing to spend more time with Farrow, Birkin 'justified [his] presence on the set by becoming the resident Barrie expert.' His proposal to the BBC was based on his notes from that research. Birkin worked closely with Nicholas Llewelyn Davies, the youngest and last survivor of the five brothers, and his script adheres closely to the known facts and timeline of the Barries' and the Davies's lives, sometimes using surviving correspondence between the subjects as the basis for dialogue.

== Reception ==
The Lost Boys was first aired on BBC-2 television in three weekly 90-minute episodes, beginning 11 October 1978. Reviews were highly favourable. The critic Sean Day-Lewis wrote in The Daily Telegraph, 'I doubt if biography has ever been better televised than in this sensitive and beautifully crafted masterpiece, and I am quite sure such excellence is beyond any other television service in the world. ... The entire House of Commons should be required to view it before voting on the proposed increase in BBC funding.' Janet Dunbar (Barrie's 1971 biographer) called it 'a brilliant achievement ... a classic in the television medium – one of the finest pieces of television drama I have ever seen. ... I had the experience of watching, not Ian Holm playing J M Barrie, but Barrie himself ... the definitive recreation of J M Barrie in dramatic terms.' Nancy Banks-Smith wrote in The Guardian: 'Andrew Birkin's convincing and compelling biographical trilogy is most beautifully and sensitively done. ... There is a nice ambivalence about The Lost Boys as there is about The Turn of the Screw, an ambiguity and sense of menace. A delightful frightfulness. The rich sets, the allusive, elusive script which always suggests more than it says. ... The Lost Boys is a gift, a present, a parabola of pleasure to me, something to be unwrapped and tasted and rewrapped and saved until later.' Michael Church wrote in The Times: 'Andrew Birkin's superb and haunting trilogy ... something quite out of the ordinary ... Desire, devotion, disease and death loom out in disturbingly intimate close up. ... Ian Holm, physically Barrie to the life, rules absolutely.' Chris Dunkley wrote in the Financial Times, 'It is only very rarely that a television drama comes along in which every constituent manages to provide a flawless contribution. The Lost Boys has been such a production.'

The film was cited in several annual round-ups, including Benny Green in Punch: 'Best Original Drama: The Lost Boys, which advanced from competence to brilliance to deep compassion and mastery of touch, and which, for intensity of characterization and economy of writing, was a masterpiece of the televisual form.' The BBC's Director-General Sir Ian Trethowan called it 'a landmark in television drama'.

The BBC published the full scripts when the series was repeated in 1980, The Spectator calling them 'a priceless addition to a corpus of literature of coherent television drama.'

== Awards ==
- Won: 1979 BAFTA (Best Television Lighting, Sam Barclay)
- Nominated: 1979 BAFTA (Best Actor, Ian Holm)
- Nominated: 1979 BAFTA (Best Film Cameraman, Elmer Cossey)
- Nominated: 1979 BAFTA (Best VTR Editor, Charles Huff)
- Won: 1979 Royal Television Society (Best Design, Barry Newbery)
- Won: 1979 Royal Television Society (Best Performance, Ian Holm)
- Won: 1979 Royal Television Society (Best Writer, Andrew Birkin)

== See also ==
- List of works based on Peter Pan
