= Nicholas Llewelyn Davies =

Member of the Llewelyn Davies family

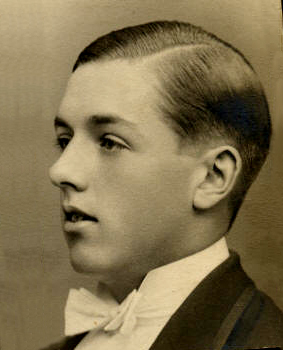
- Davies in 1922
- Born: 24 November 1903; London, England
- Died: 14 October 1980 (aged 76); Eythorne, Kent, England
- Occupation: Publisher
- Known for: Foster son of J. M. Barrie
- Spouse: Mary James
- Children: 1
- Parents: Arthur Llewelyn Davies (father); Sylvia du Maurier (mother)

Nicholas "Nico" Llewelyn Davies (24 November 1903 – 14 October 1980) was the youngest of the Llewelyn Davies boys, who were the inspiration for J. M. Barrie's Peter Pan and the Lost Boys. He was only a year old when Peter Pan, or The Boy Who Wouldn't Grow Up hit the stage in 1904, and as such was not a primary inspiration for the characters of Peter and the Lost Boys. However he was eight years old when the novel adaptation Peter and Wendy was published, and in later editions of the play, the character Michael Darling's middle name was changed to "Nicholas". He was the first cousin of the English writer Daphne du Maurier.

== Early life ==
When Davies was born, Barrie was already a friend of his brothers and mother Sylvia. Following the deaths of the boys' father Arthur (1907) and mother (1910), Barrie became their guardian (along with their uncles Guy du Maurier and Crompton Llewelyn Davies, and their grandmother Emma du Maurier). Two of Davies's brothers died before he was an adult: George was killed in combat in World War I in 1915, Michael drowned with a close friend in 1921. Davies attended Eton College, and started at Oxford University in 1922, but continued to spend holidays with Barrie.

== Adult life ==
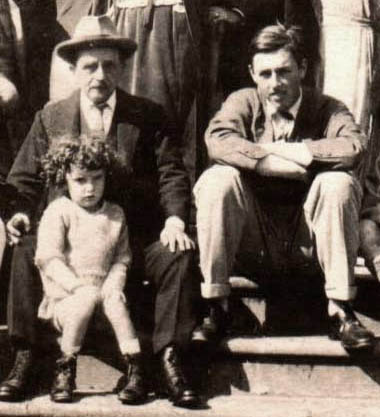
Davies (right) and J. M. Barrie in 1922

In 1926 he married Mary James, daughter of Walter John James, 3rd Baron Northbourne, and they had a daughter Laura, born in 1928. Barrie became godfather to Laura. In 1935 he joined his brother's publishing firm, Peter Davies Ltd. His brother Jack died in 1959, and Peter committed suicide in 1960. As the last surviving subject of the 1978 BBC mini-series The Lost Boys, he was a consultant to writer Andrew Birkin. He died on 14 October 1980 at his home in Eythorne, Kent.

== Portrayals ==
In The Lost Boys, he was portrayed at various ages by Stephen Mathews, Jason Fathers, Matthew Ryan, and David Parfitt (later award-winning producer).

He was not included in the 2004 film Finding Neverland based on the story of Barrie's relationship with the family and the writing of the play. It took the dramatic licence of placing the dates of Davies's father's death and his mother's illness much earlier relative to the writing of the play, leaving no practical place in its timeline for his birth.
