= Theodora Llewelyn Davies =

British barrister and penal reform campaigner

- Born: 1898; Birkenhead, England
- Died: 1988 (aged 89–90); Birmingham, England
- Other names: Theodora Llewelyn Calvert; Mrs Roy Calvert
- Occupation: Lawyer
- Spouse: Roy Calvert (m. 1929; died 1933)
- Children: 2
- Relatives: John Llewelyn Davies (grandfather); Arthur Llewelyn Davies (uncle); Margaret Llewelyn Davies (aunt)

Theodora Llewelyn Davies (18 April 1898 – 21 December 1988) was a British barrister and penal reform campaigner. She was the first woman to apply for admission to the British legal profession's Inner Temple in 1920 and one of the first to be admitted in November 1922.

== Early life and education ==
Theodora Llewelyn Davies was born in Birkenhead on 18 April 1898 to Maurice Llewelyn Davies and May Roberts. She was one of three children with brother Roland and sister Mary. Her mother died in childbirth when she was four. Llewelyn Davies was raised by her father and her mother's sister, Nellie. She came from an illustrious family. Her father's sister was Margaret Llewelyn Davies and his brother was Arthur Llewelyn Davies. Her great aunt Emily Davies was the founder of Girton College in Cambridge, the first college for women. Her grandfather was Rev. John Llewelyn Davies, Rector of Christ Church, Marylebone, who was a strong advocate for women's education. She had a cousin, Winifred Nicholson, who was an artist. Her daughter is Jane Wynne Willson. Llewelyn Davies attended Birkenhead High School before going on to St. Paul's Girls' School in London. She studied law at London University for a year in 1916 when the First World War had created capacity with so many students away fighting. In 1917, she went to Girton College. Her brother Roland died in October 1918 in France.

== Career ==
During the time that Llewelyn Davies was in college, the Sex Disqualification (Removal) Act began its procession through the houses of parliament which would allow women more equality with men in the legal profession. They were to be able to serve on juries, to be magistrates and solicitors, and eventually be called to the Bar. The Inner Temple did not want to be legally forced to allow women to join and so before the legislation was completed, they opened the Bar voluntarily. Llewelyn Davies was the first woman to apply, on 9 January 1920 and was finally admitted in November 1922. On 26 January, Llewelyn Davies was joined by Ivy Williams who had an exceptional record in her university and thus was able to cut through some of the processes and was called to the Bar on 10 May 1922 while Llewelyn Davies had to wait until 17 November 1922.

During her first dinner at the Inner Temple, her sister walked her to the door while the custodian at the hall ensured she was not harassed by newspaper reporters and ensured she got a seat she could manage with her long skirts. There were no bathrooms for women in the facility so Llewelyn Davies was given a key to the Benchers' House, which had a cloakroom for women guests at social events. Her uncle Arthur Llewelyn Davies had been a member of the Inner Temple. Her cousins Sir Malcolm Macnaghten and Theo Mathew, better known as the writer ‘O’, took on her training in the chambers. She worked there for seven years taking on some dock briefs, attending assizes, and written work.

In 1926, Llewelyn Davies became Honorary Legal adviser to the Women's Engineering Society. The organisation's Seventh Annual Report, authored by Caroline Haslett noted "On more than one occasion during the year … [she] has given us the benefit of her advice, and our warm thanks are due to her for her kindly and practical help". On her resignation, Llewelyn Davies was succeeded by Helena Normanton.

== Later life ==
Llewelyn Davies married Roy Calvert on 28 June 1929 in Amersham and they had two daughters. Both were interested in penal reform and the abolition of the death penalty. They were members of the executive committee of the Howard League for Penal Reform where they met. The couple toured American penal institutions and attended the 59th Annual Congress of the American Prison Association. The couple wrote The Lawbreaker – a Critical Study of the Modern Treatment of Crime. Her husband died in 1933 after a routine operation. After his death, Llewelyn Davies moved back in with her sister and father. In November 1935, Llewelyn Davies was appointed justice of the peace for Surrey. Her father died in 1939 and Mary in 1976. Over the years they lived in London, Surrey, Cheltenham, and Birmingham. Llewelyn Davies died in December 1988 at the age of 90 of bronchopneumonia in Birmingham.
