= Peter Llewelyn Davies =

British publisher, friend of J.M. Barrie (1897–1960)

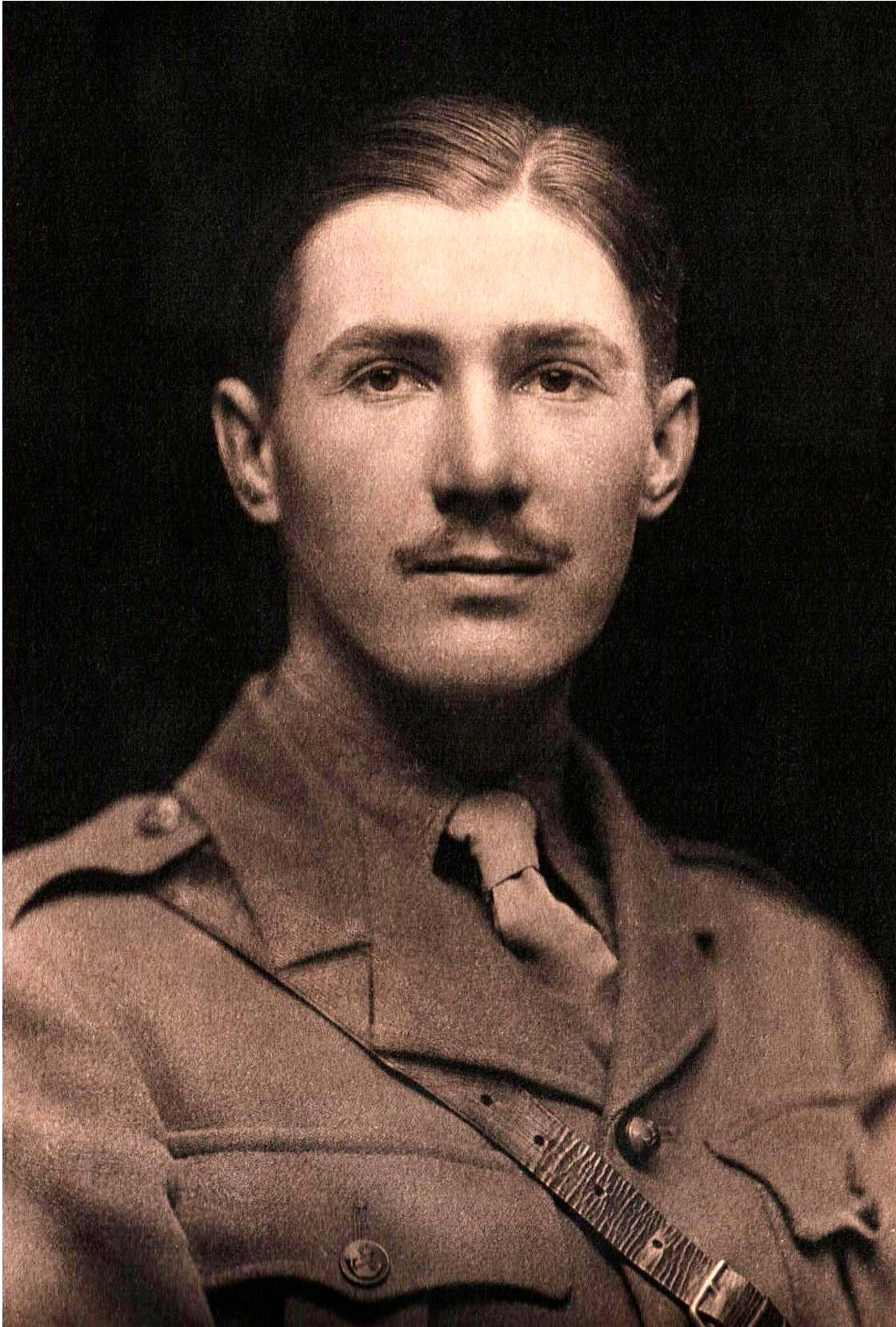
- Born: 25 February 1897; London, England
- Died: 5 April 1960 (aged 63); London, England
- Occupation: Publisher
- Known for: Foster son of J. M. Barrie
- Spouse: Margaret Leslie Hore-Ruthven (m. 1931)
- Children: 3
- Parent(s): Arthur Llewelyn Davies; Sylvia du Maurier
- Military career
- Allegiance: United Kingdom
- Branch: British Army
- Conflicts: World War I: German Spring Offensive
- Awards: Military Cross

Peter Llewelyn Davies MC (25 February 1897 – 5 April 1960) was the middle of five sons of Arthur and Sylvia Llewelyn Davies, one of the Llewelyn Davies boys befriended and later informally adopted by J. M. Barrie. Barrie publicly identified him as the source of the name for the title character in his 1904 play Peter Pan, or The Boy Who Wouldn't Grow Up.

He was awarded the Military Cross after serving as an officer in World War I, and in 1926 founded the Peter Davies publishing house. He struggled emotionally after the war, and eventually ended his life by suicide.

He was the first cousin of the English writer Daphne du Maurier.

== Childhood ==
Davies was an infant in a pram when Barrie befriended his older brothers George and Jack during outings in Kensington Gardens, with their nurse Mary Hodgson. Barrie's original description of Peter Pan in The Little White Bird (1902) was as a newborn baby who had escaped to Kensington Gardens. However, according to family accounts, his brothers George and Michael served as the primary models for the character as he appeared in the famed stage play (1904) and later novel (1911), as a pre-adolescent boy.

In 1904, the year when Barrie's play, Peter Pan, or The Boy Who Wouldn't Grow Up, debuted at London's Duke of York's Theatre, the Davies family moved out of London and went to live at Egerton House, an Elizabethan mansion house in Berkhamsted, Hertfordshire. Their time there lasted only three years; in 1907, Davies's father died of cancer and his mother took Davies and his brothers George, Jack, Michael, and Nico back to London. She too developed cancer and died in 1910. In her will, she named Barrie, the boys' uncles Crompton Llewelyn Davies and Guy du Maurier as well as her mother, Emma, as guardians to her sons. Hodgson continued to serve as nurse and surrogate mother for him and his brothers, with Barrie taking on the duties of the main guardian and supporting them financially.

Davies, like his brothers (apart from Jack), attended Eton College.

== Adulthood ==
Davies volunteered along with his brother George to serve in World War I, and they both received commissions as officers in the King's Royal Rifle Corps in September 1914. He was a signal officer in France and spent time in the trenches; at one point he was hospitalized with impetigo. By March 1918, he had reached the rank of captain and was the adjutant for 7th Battalion KRRC, when the German spring offensive started. Davies took charge of the battalion after their colonel was wounded during a fighting retreat that lasted for 15 days, for which he was awarded the Military Cross; however, he was emotionally scarred by his wartime experience. His brother George was killed at the age of 21 at Ypres in March 1915.

In 1917, while still in the military, Davies met and began to court Hungarian-born Vera Willoughby (a watercolour painter and illustrator, as well as a costume and poster designer), a married woman 27 years older, with a daughter older than he was. He stayed with her when on leave, which scandalized Barrie and caused a rift between the two. His former nurse and mother figure Mary Hodgson disapproved strongly as well. The relationship continued at least through the end of his military service in 1919. In 1926 he published an edition of George Farquhar's The Recruiting Officer featuring illustrations by Willoughby.

In 1926, Davies, with financial help from Barrie, founded a publishing house named Peter Davies.

He married Margaret Leslie Hore-Ruthven, youngest daughter of Maj-Gen Walter Hore-Ruthven, in 1931, and had three sons with her: Ruthven (1933–1998), George (b. 1935) and Peter (1940–1989).

He grew to dislike having his name associated with Peter Pan, which he called "that terrible masterpiece". Upon Barrie's death in 1937, most of his estate and fortune went to his secretary Cynthia Asquith, and the copyright to the Peter Pan works had previously been given in 1929 to Great Ormond Street Hospital for Children in London. Davies and his surviving brothers each received a legacy. Davies's son Ruthven later told an interviewer:

My father had mixed feelings about the whole business of Peter Pan. He accepted that Barrie considered that he was the inspiration for Peter Pan and it was only reasonable that my father should inherit everything from Barrie. That was my father's expectation. It would have recompensed him for the notoriety he had experienced since being linked with Peter Pan—something he hated.

He assembled and edited family papers and letters into a collection which he called the Morgue and completed in 1950.

== Publishing firm ==
In 1926 Peter Davies launched his publishing house, named Peter Davies. He was joined in the enterprise by his brother Nico. By 1928 the firm had become a limited company trading as Peter Davies Limited.

In the 1920s and 1930s the firm published "many histories and biographies by popular authors". In 1947 the firm republished the novels of Peter and Nico's maternal grandfather, George du Maurier and in 1951 it published a volume of his letters, The Young George du Maurier: A Selection of His Letters 1860–67 edited by his granddaughter Daphne du Maurier. Other notable books published included Jules Romains's Men of Good Will, Lloyd C. Douglas's The Robe, some Mary Poppins titles, some J. M. Barrie titles, Charles Rickett's Self Portrait, Josephine Tey's The Daughter of Time, and Louis Armstrong's Satchmo: My Life in New Orleans. The firm is notable for having been the first to publish the works of Australian writer Christina Stead, who Davies met in Paris in 1931. Until the late 1940s, the firm acted as Stead's UK publisher and went on to publish several of her works including The Salzburg Tales, Seven Poor Men of Sydney, The Beauties and Furies and The Man Who Loved Children.

Book series published by the firm included the Covent Garden Library, Little Books and Soldiers' Tales.

In 1937 Heinemann publishers bought a majority interest in Peter Davies Ltd. which continued to trade until 1977 when it was completely taken over by Heinemann.

== Death ==
On 5 April 1960, after lingering at the bar of the Royal Court Hotel, 63-year-old Davies walked to the nearby Sloane Square station of the London Underground and threw himself under a train as it was pulling into the station. A coroner's jury ruled that he had killed himself "while the balance of his mind was disturbed". Possible contributing factors to his suicide were his alcoholism and ill health (he was suffering from emphysema). Newspaper reports of his death referred to him in their headlines as "Peter Pan".

== Portrayals ==
In the 1978 BBC mini-series The Lost Boys, he was portrayed at various ages by Jean-Benoit Louveaux, Matthew Blakstad, Dominic Heath, and Tom Kelly.

In the 2004 film Finding Neverland, he was portrayed as a child by Freddie Highmore, presenting him as a child troubled by his father's death, who is drawn out of his shell by Barrie; Highmore received a Screen Actors Guild Award nomination for his performance. In the musical adaptation, he was portrayed by Harry Polden in the 2012 U.K. premiere; Aidan Gemme played Davies in the American Repertory Theater (2014) and original Broadway theatre (2015) productions.

In the 2013 play Peter and Alice by John Logan, he was portrayed by Ben Whishaw as a troubled individual who had been hurt by his fame and his past.
