= Arthur Llewelyn Davies =

English barrister

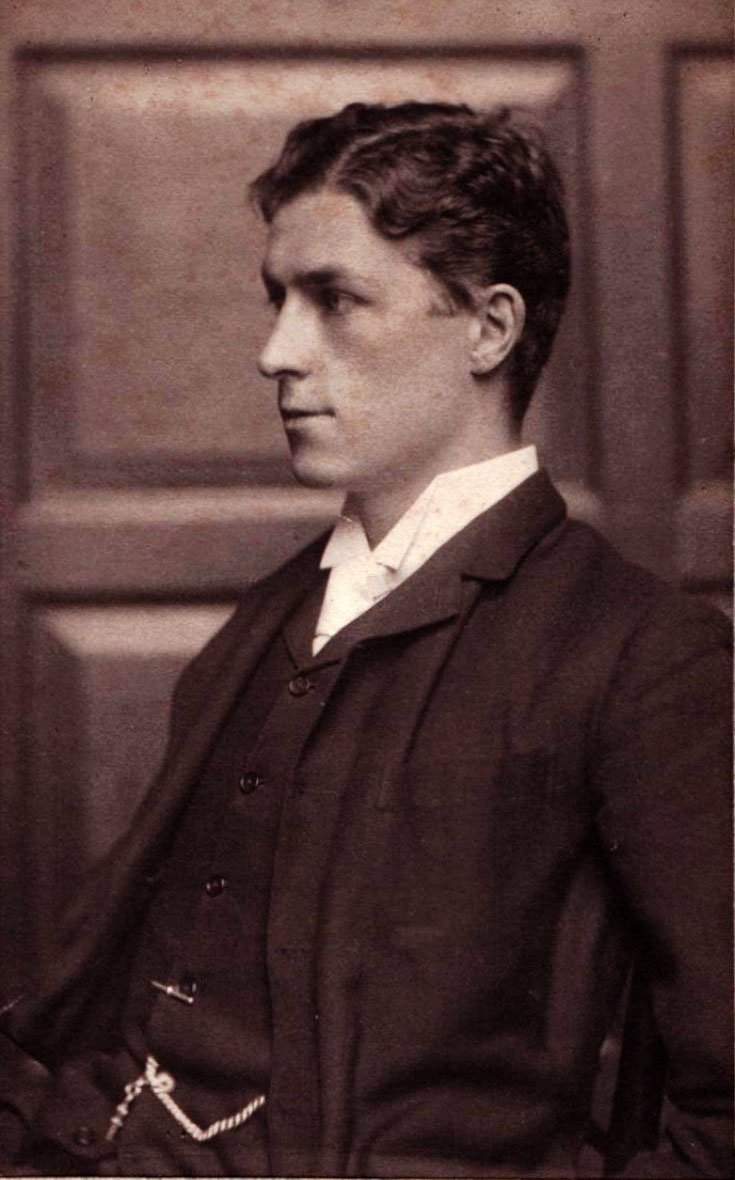
- Davies in 1890
- Born: 20 February 1863; Kirkby Lonsdale, England
- Died: 19 April 1907 (aged 44); Berkhamsted, Hertfordshire, England
- Education: Trinity College, Cambridge
- Occupation: Barrister
- Spouse: Sylvia du Maurier (m. 1892)
- Children: George; Jack; Peter; Michael; Nicholas
- Parents: John Llewelyn Davies (father); Mary Crompton (mother)
- Relatives: Margaret Llewelyn Davies (sister); Theodora Llewelyn Davies (niece)

Arthur Llewelyn Davies (20 February 1863 – 19 April 1907) was an English barrister of Welsh origin, but is best known as the father of the boys who were the inspiration for the stories of Peter Pan by J. M. Barrie.

== Biography ==
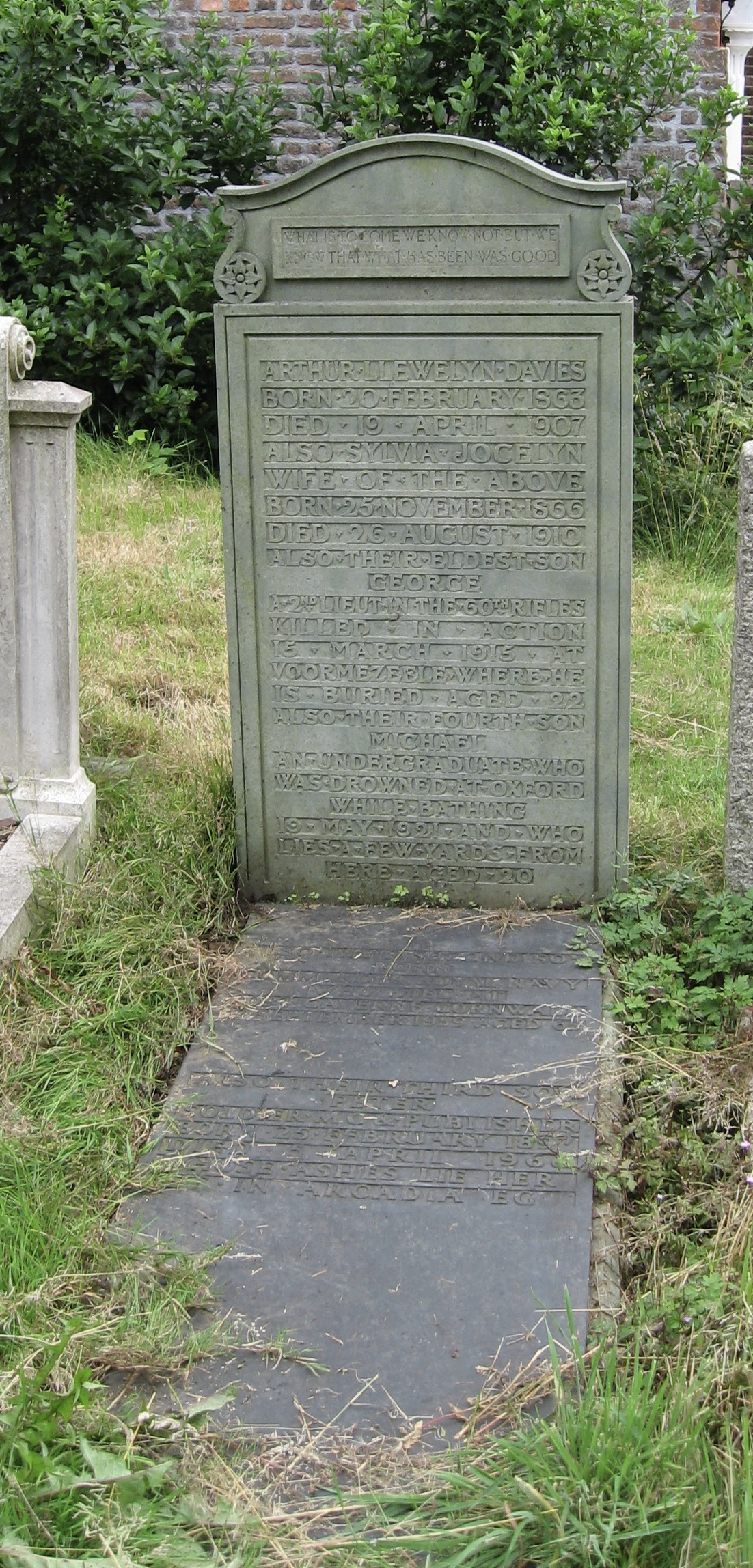
The grave of Arthur and Sylvia Llewelyn Davies and their sons Jack and Peter at St John-at-Hampstead churchyard.

Born 20 February 1863, Davies was the second son of Mary Crompton and John Llewelyn Davies, vicar of Kirkby Lonsdale, a fellow of Trinity College, Cambridge, an early alpinist who was the first ascendant of the third highest mountain in the Alps, and an outspoken foe of poverty and inequality active in Christian socialist groups. His sister was suffragist Margaret Llewelyn Davies. His niece was Theodora Llewelyn Davies, the first woman admitted, in 1920, to the British legal profession's Inner Temple.

Davies attended Marlborough College and Trinity College, Cambridge. He was briefly a master at Eton College, but left that position to practice law.

He met Sylvia du Maurier (daughter of cartoonist George du Maurier and sister of future actor Gerald du Maurier) at a dinner party in 1889 and they became engaged shortly thereafter. He married her in 1892, and they had five children, all boys: George (1893–1915), Jack (1894–1959), Peter (1897–1960), Michael (1900–1921), and Nicholas (1903–1980).

In 1897, his pre-school sons George and Jack became friends with J.M. Barrie, whom they met during outings in Kensington Gardens with their nurse Mary Hodgson and their infant brother Peter. He and Sylvia then met Barrie and his wife Mary at a New Year's Eve dinner party that year, and she took up a close friendship with the writer as well. Although Davies did not encourage the ongoing friendship of his wife and sons with Barrie, and did not share their fondness for him, he did little to stand in the way of it. He permitted Barrie to spend considerable time at the Davies home, and for his family to visit with the Barries – who were childless – at their country cottage. During one of the holidays the families spent together, Barrie took a series of photographs of the boys' adventures, which he compiled into a photo book titled The Boy Castaways; Barrie gave one of the two copies printed to Davies, who misplaced it on a train.

Barrie's 1901 novel The Little White Bird features characters inspired by Davies' family – a boy David in George's age range, and the boy's mother who resembles Sylvia – who are befriended by a thinly disguised version of the author. Barrie's play Peter Pan, or the Boy Who Wouldn't Grow Up, inspired by Davies' boys, debuted in December 1904. The chapters of The Little White Bird featuring Peter Pan were republished in 1906 as Peter Pan in Kensington Gardens, with the dedication "To Sylvia and Arthur Llewelyn Davies and their boys (my boys)".

In 1904, the year when Barrie's play debuted, Davies moved with his family out of London when they purchased Egerton House, an Elizabethan mansion house in Berkhamsted, Hertfordshire. In 1906, he discovered a growth in his cheek which turned out to be a malignant sarcoma. He had two operations, which removed much of his upper jaw, palate, and cheekbone, and the tear duct on that side. This left him disfigured and unable to talk, even with an artificial jaw insert, but failed to remove all of the cancer and left him in considerable pain. Barrie, who had become wealthy from his books and plays, paid for his medical care, and became a regular companion at his bedside, especially in his final months. During this time, Davies described Barrie in a letter to his son Peter as "a very good friend to all of us". Family accounts differ on just how close the two actually became. Davies died at Egerton on 19 April 1907, at the age of 44.

== Portrayals ==
In the 1978 BBC mini-series The Lost Boys, he was portrayed by Tim Pigott-Smith.

He did not appear in the 2004 film Finding Neverland, nor the 2015 Broadway musical based on it, about Sylvia and Barrie's relationship and the writing of Peter Pan. Although he was alive for most of the events depicted, in the dramatization he was said to have already died when Barrie entered the family's life. This simplified the plot, and avoided the subject of Barrie's influence on the Davies' marriage.
