= John Davies (priest, born 1795) =

Welsh cleric & philosopher (1795–1861)

John D. Davies
- Born: December 1795; Llanddewi-Brefi
- Died: 21 October 1861 (aged 65); Ilkley Wells, Yorkshire
- Occupation: priest

John D. Davies (December 1795 – 21 October 1861) was a Welsh priest and author.

== Early life ==
He was born in Llanddewi-Brefi, the son of John or James and Jane Davies, who farmed at Hendre Phylip (or Philip), near Tregaron. His mother was Jane Richards of Garnlwyd, Llanbadarn Odwyn, near Llangeitho. After her death, when John was in his early teens, his father remarried and emigrated to the United States. John Davies, one of a family of at least six, was left in the care of his maternal uncle Mr. Richards.

Davies attended grammar school in Lampeter, where he was taught by Eliezer Williams.

== Clerical career ==
Davies matriculated at St Edmund Hall, Oxford in 1817, aged 22. He was ordained deacon in June 1819, by Henry Bathurst, Bishop of Norwich, and then in December that year was ordained priest, by George Henry Law, Bishop of Chester. He then entered Queens' College, Cambridge, as a sizar, in 1820. A ten-year man, he matriculated there and graduated B.D. in 1831. He graduated D.D. in 1844.

Also in 1820 Davies became a curate at Saint Peter the Great, Chichester, under Bartholomew Middleton. He was for a few years an assistant teacher at Chichester Prebendal Grammar School. Its headmaster, ex officio with the Headley prebend at Chichester Cathedral, was George Bliss, also a curate, at Funtington. Bliss, Davies, and another curate associated with the school, Stephen Barbut, were all evangelicals. The tithes for the prebend (not at this point subject to commutation), were involved in Middleton's marriage settlement with his wife Elizabeth Powell. The settlement fell in later, while Davies held the prebend.

After his marriage in 1823, Davies set up his own school. It, however, began an itinerant period: Davies was in poor health, and concentrated on writing. In 1827 he resigned his Chichester curacy, and moved to Carlton Crescent, Southampton. In 1829 Davies lobbied for a chair at the new London University, circulating copies of his work An Estimate of the Human Mind. Zachary Macaulay was sympathetic to him, as an evangelical. But the professors were not stipendiary, and the effort came to nothing. Daughter Emily was born in Southampton, in 1830. That year the family moved back to Chichester, and in 1831 Davies became rector of St Pancras, Chichester, where George Bliss had acquired the advowson.

Edward Maltby became Bishop of Chichester in 1831. Davies was quickly on good terms with him. In 1833 Maltby agreed to ordain Thomas Speck, about to graduate at Cambridge, to serve as curate to Davies, allowing Davies to spend time abroad for his health. The Davies family immediately moved to Avranches, in northern France.

Maltby became Bishop of Durham in 1836. In 1840 the family moved north, when Maltby made Davies rector of Gateshead, County Durham, a position he held to 1860, when he retired. In 1853 he was made Honorary Canon of Durham Cathedral.

== Death ==
John Davies died on 21 October 1861 at Ilkley Wells, Yorkshire.

== Works ==
Davies wrote a great deal. His published works include:

- The Estimate of the Human Mind (1828) (2nd ed., 1847)
- First Impressions: A Series of Letters from France, Switzerland, and Savoy (1834), letters to Henry Raikes
- The Ministerial Commission. Two Sermons (1840)
- Essay on the Old and New Testaments (1843)
- The Ordinances of Religion
- The Cultivation of the Mind
- A Glance at the European Continent (1852), lectures

== Family ==
Davies married in 1823 Mary Hopkinson, whom he had met in Chichester. She was the daughter of John Hopkinson, originally from Derby, a retired businessman, and his wife Sarah. John Hopkinson made Mary co-heir with his son. A newspaper report of the marriage identified "Rev. G. Davis" as "primary usher" of the Grammar School, and "Miss Hopkinson" as of West Gate, Chichester. In 1839 was reported the death on 30 November "at West Gate, Chichester, Mr. John Hopkinson, aged 79, formerly of Testwood Mills, near Southampton."

The couple had a family of three sons and two daughters.

- The second daughter, Sarah Emily Davies (1830–1921), born while the family was resident in Southampton, was a pioneer of women's education and co-founder of Girton College, Cambridge.
- John Llewelyn Davies (1826–1916) was a prominent theologian and Christian socialist.
