= John Llewelyn Davies =

British preacher and theologian (1826–1916)

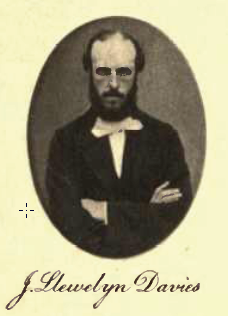
- Born: 26 February 1826; Chichester, England
- Died: 18 May 1916 (aged 90); Hampstead, London, England
- Education: Trinity College, Cambridge
- Occupations: Preacher, theologian
- Spouse: Mary Crompton (m. 1859)
- Children: Charles; Margaret; Arthur; Maurice; Harry; Crompton; Theodore
- Father: John D. Davies

John Llewelyn Davies (26 February 1826 – 18 May 1916) was an English preacher and theologian, an outspoken foe of poverty and inequality, and was active in Christian socialist groups. He was an original member of the Alpine Club and the first ascendant of the Dom. His daughter was suffragist Margaret Llewelyn Davies. His son Arthur Llewelyn Davies was the father of the boys who were the inspiration for the stories of Peter Pan by J. M. Barrie. His sister Emily Davies was one of the founders of Girton College.

== Early life and education ==
Born 26 February 1826 in Chichester, Davies was the son of John D. Davies, one of the leading Evangelical clergyman of his day. He attended Repton School and Trinity College, Cambridge.

== Career ==
Davies was elected to a fellowship at Trinity College in 1851. In 1852, he and colleague David James Vaughan published a popular English translation of Plato's Republic, which they sold to the publisher for £60. He wrote extensively on New Testament theology, especially the epistles of Paul. He was ordained in 1851 by the Church of England, and took an unpaid curacy at St Anne's Limehouse. He was reassigned in 1853 to St Mark's Whitechapel, then in 1856 became vicar of Christ Church, Cosway Street, Marylebone. Queen Victoria made him an Honorary Chaplain to the Queen in 1876. In 1889 became vicar of Kirkby Lonsdale, where he served until 1908.

Davies worked with John Frederick Denison Maurice in the foundation of the Working Men's College in 1854, where he subsequently taught.

== Mountaineering ==
Davies was one of the 31 founding members of the Alpine Club (UK), in 1857 and resigning from it in 1864. He attended its 50th jubilee celebration in 1907 and then rejoined in 1909.

Davies was in the first ascent party of the Dom on 11 September 1858 and of the Täschhorn on 30 July 1862. Davies published a detailed account of the first ascent of the Dom in Peaks, Passes and Glaciers.

== Personal life ==
In 1859, he married Mary Crompton, the eldest daughter of Charles John Crompton. They had seven children: Charles (1860–1927), Margaret (1861–1944), Arthur (1863–1907, died of cancer), Maurice (1864–1939), Harry (1866–1923), Crompton (1868–1935), and Theodore (1870–1905, died of drowning). Mary Llewelyn Davies died in 1895. John Llewelyn Davies died in Hampstead on 18 May 1916.
