= George Llewelyn Davies =

British Army officer

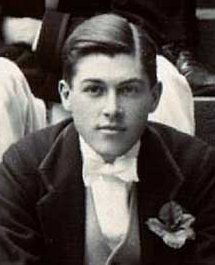
- Davies in his last year at Eton in 1912 at age 19
- Born: 20 July 1893; London, England
- Died: 15 March 1915 (aged 21); St. Eloi, Belgium
- Cause of death: Killed in action
- Occupation: Soldier
- Known for: Foster son of J. M. Barrie
- Parents: Arthur Llewelyn Davies (father); Sylvia du Maurier (mother)

George Llewelyn Davies (20 July 1893 – 15 March 1915) was the eldest son of Arthur and Sylvia Llewelyn Davies. Along with his four younger brothers, George was the inspiration for playwright J. M. Barrie's characters of Peter Pan and the Lost Boys. The character of Mr. George Darling was named after him. He was killed in action in the First World War. He was the first cousin of the English writer Daphne du Maurier.

== Early life ==
Davies (the family only used the double surname Llewelyn Davies on official occasions) and his brother Jack met Barrie during their regular outings to Kensington Gardens, with their nurse Mary Hodgson. As the oldest (he was four years old when he met Barrie) he featured most prominently in the early storytelling and play adventures from which the writer drew ideas for Barrie's works around that time about young boys. He and Jack (and to a lesser extent Peter) were featured in a photo storybook The Boy Castaways which Barrie made during a shared holiday at Barrie's Black Lake Cottage in 1901.

In the 1904 play Peter Pan, or The Boy Who Wouldn't Grow Up, Peter Pan is roughly 10 – the same age that Davies was when Barrie began writing the play in 1903. Barrie reported taking some of the characterisation of Peter and individual Lost Boys from things Davies and his younger brothers said or did. For example, in response to Barrie's oral tales about babies who died and went to live in Neverland, the boy reportedly exclaimed, "To die will be an awfully big adventure"; this became one of Peter Pan's most memorable lines.

Barrie financially supported Davies and his brothers following the death of their father (1907), and became their primary guardian following the death of their mother (1910). Davies remained very close with "Uncle Jim" as he grew up and went away to school, with the two exchanging letters regularly. His youngest brother Nico later described him (and their brother Michael) as "The Ones": the boys who meant the most to Barrie.

== Adult life ==
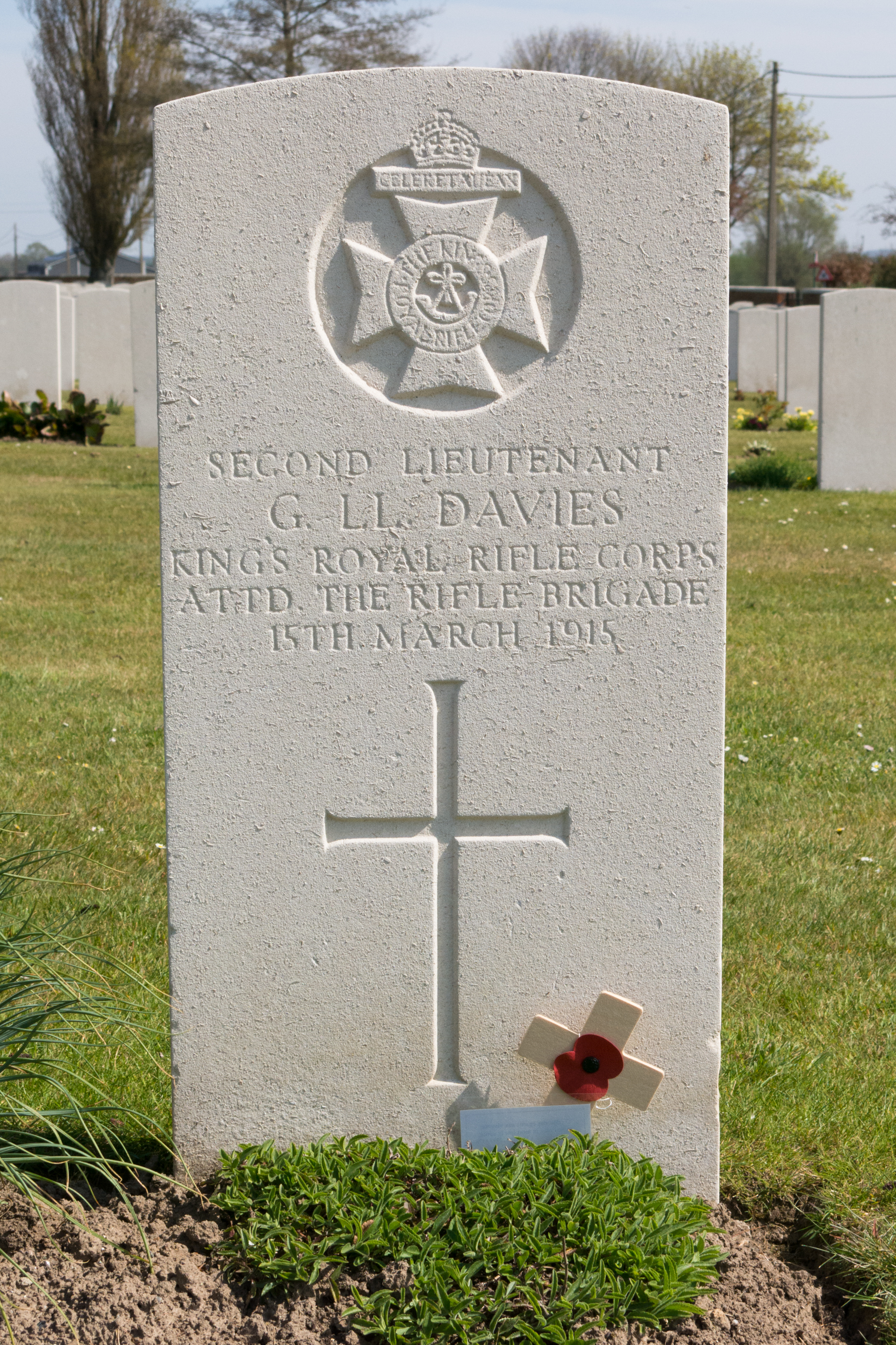
Commonwealth War Graves Commission headstone at Davies's grave in Belgium

Davies attended the Berkhamsted School followed by Eton College, where he excelled at sports (especially cricket) and was elected to the elite social club Pop while still an underclassman. He later attended Trinity College, Cambridge, where he joined the Amateur Dramatic Club (ADC), following in the footsteps of both his uncle, actor Gerald du Maurier, and his dramatist guardian.

Following the UK's entry into World War I, Davies and his brother Peter volunteered for service. He received a commission as a second lieutenant in the King's Royal Rifle Corps and served in the trenches in Flanders On the morning of 15 March 1915, Davies attended an early morning briefing with the battalion's colonel, where the officers were receiving instructions for an advance on the German position at St. Eloi (Ypres). Resting on a bank, Davies had not realised he was sitting in an exposed position. He died of a gunshot wound to the head, aged 21, killed by a German sniper. This occurred six days after the death of his uncle, Colonel Guy du Maurier. J. M. Barrie wrote to George to inform him of his uncle's death, but by the time Barrie received his reply, George himself had been killed.

Originally buried near where he fell, his remains were later moved to the Voormezeele Enclosures Commonwealth War Graves Commission Cemeteries in Voormezele, near Ypres, Belgium.

== Portrayals ==
In the 1978 BBC mini-series The Lost Boys, he was portrayed at various ages by Barnaby Holm (son of actor Ian Holm, who portrayed Barrie), Paul Holmes, Philip Kassler, Mark Benson and Christopher Blake.

In the 2004 film Finding Neverland he was portrayed as a child by Nick Roud.

In 2014 he was portrayed by Sawyer Nunes in the musical adaptation Finding Neverland and in its 2015 Broadway production.
