= Jack Llewelyn Davies =

Royal Navy officer

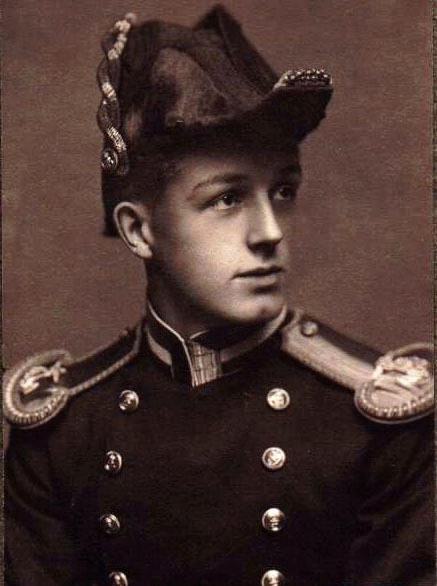
- Davies in naval uniform in 1914 at age 20
- Born: 11 September 1894; London, England
- Died: 17 September 1959 (aged 65); Port Gaverne, Cornwall
- Known for: Foster son of J. M. Barrie
- Spouse: Gerrie Gibb (m. 1917)
- Children: 2
- Parent(s): Arthur Llewelyn Davies; Sylvia du Maurier

John "Jack" Llewelyn Davies (11 September 1894 – 17 September 1959) was the second eldest of the Llewelyn Davies boys, who were befriended by Peter Pan creator J. M. Barrie, and one of the inspirations for the boy characters in the story of Peter Pan. He served in the Royal Navy during World War I. Additionally, he was the first cousin of the English writer Daphne du Maurier.

== Childhood ==
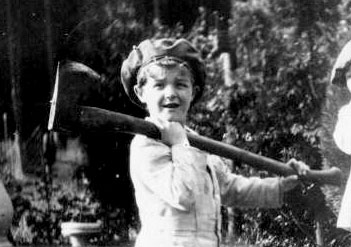
Davies in The Boy Castaways, almost 7 years old

Davies and his elder brother George first met writer J. M. Barrie on their regular outings in Kensington Gardens with their nurse Mary Hodgson and infant brother Peter in 1897. They took part in play adventures with Barrie which provided much of the inspiration for the adventures in the 1904 stage play Peter Pan, or The Boy Who Wouldn't Grow Up. Shortly before writing the play, Barrie created a photo book titled The Boy Castaways, featuring the three oldest brothers pretending to be shipwrecked on an island and fighting pirates, themes that later appeared in the Peter Pan story. The character of John Darling, the older of Wendy's brothers, was named after him.

In 1906 Davies was recommended by Barrie to Captain Robert F. Scott for a position at Osborne Naval College, unlike his brothers, who all attended Eton College. Following the deaths of his parents Arthur (1907) and Sylvia (1910), Barrie became the main guardian of the five boys, supporting them financially. Jack reportedly harboured some resentment towards Barrie, at times believing the writer was trying to take his father's place (especially after his father died). He was not as close to the writer as were his brothers, especially George and Michael.

== Adulthood ==
Just before his mother's death, Davies became an officer in the Royal Navy, after attending the Royal Naval College at Osborne. As a regular naval officer he served in the North Atlantic during World War I. His brother George was killed in action on the Western Front in 1915. His brother Michael drowned in an apparent accident in 1921. His brothers Peter and Nico (the youngest) outlived him.

He married 19-year-old Geraldine "Gerrie" Gibb in 1917, without first asking permission of Barrie, who only grudgingly approved of the relationship. Nonetheless, Barrie gave the couple charge of the Davies family house, where Michael and Nico still lived during school holidays, in the care of Mary Hodgson. Friction between Gerrie and Hodgson led to the elder woman's resignation. The couple had two children: Timothy (1921–1965) and Sylvia Jocelyn (named after Davies's mother, but always known as Jane) (1924–1969).

Davies was appointed to the naval rank of lieutenant commander in 1924. Upon retirement from the Royal Navy, he and Gerrie moved to a cottage in St Endellion, Northern Cornwall. During the late 1940s, his brother Peter, a publisher, consulted with him regarding details of a family history informally titled "The Morgue".

Davies died on 17 September 1959 at the age of 65 from lung disease; his brother Peter committed suicide about seven months later.

== Portrayals ==
In the 1978 BBC mini-series The Lost Boys, he was portrayed at various ages by Nicholas Borton, Guy Hewitt, David Wilson, and Osmund Bullock.

In the 2004 film Finding Neverland, he was portrayed as a child by Joe Prospero.
