= Sylvia Llewelyn Davies =

Mother of the inspiration for Peter Pan (1866–1910)

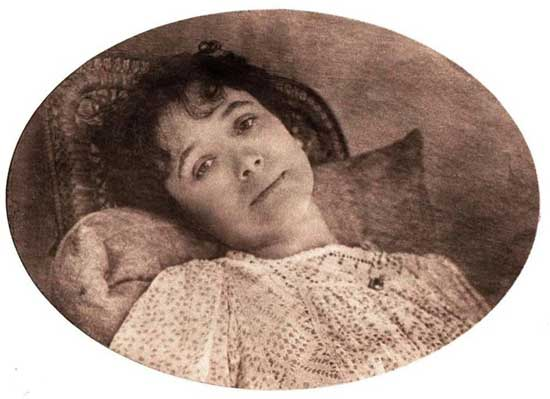
- Sylvia Llewelyn Davies, photographed by J.M. Barrie in 1898
- Born: Sylvia Jocelyn Busson du Maurier; 25 November 1866
- Died: 27 August 1910 (aged 43); Devon, England
- Spouse: Arthur Llewelyn Davies (m. 1892; died 1907)
- Children: George (1893–1915); Jack (1894–1959); Peter (1897–1960); Michael (1900–1921); Nicholas (1903–1980)
- Parents: George du Maurier (father); Emma Wightwick (mother)
- Relatives: Gerald du Maurier (brother); Guy du Maurier (brother); Angela du Maurier (niece); Daphne du Maurier (niece); Jeanne du Maurier (niece); Mary Anne Clarke (great grandmother)

Sylvia Jocelyn Busson Llewelyn Davies (née du Maurier; 25 November 1866 – 27 August 1910) was the mother of the boys who were the inspiration for the stories of Peter Pan by J. M. Barrie. She was the daughter of French-British cartoonist and writer George du Maurier and his English wife Emma Wightwick, the elder sister to actor Gerald du Maurier, the aunt of novelists Angela and Daphne du Maurier, and a great-granddaughter of Mary Anne Clarke, royal mistress of Prince Frederick, Duke of York and Albany.

She met the young Welsh barrister Arthur Llewelyn Davies at a dinner party in 1889 and they became engaged shortly thereafter. She married him in 1892, and they had five children, all boys: George (1893–1915), Jack (1894–1959), Peter (1897–1960), Michael (1900–1921), and Nicholas (Nico) (1903–1980).

In 1898, Llewelyn Davies met Barrie at a dinner party, discovering he was already friends with her three sons from their regular visits to Kensington Gardens. She and Barrie became close (he called her by her middle name "Jocelyn") and the family accompanying Barrie and his wife on holidays.

Her husband died in 1907 of a sarcoma in his cheek. She welcomed Barrie's financial and emotional support, both for herself and for her boys. Following Barrie's divorce in 1909, he and Sylvia remained close, but did not marry. She became ill with an inoperable cancer in her chest, and died in 1910. Shortly before her death, she wrote that she wanted her boys' nurse Mary Hodgson to continue caring for them, and that she knew Barrie would continue providing for them, which he did. She named him, along with her mother Emma du Maurier, her brother Guy du Maurier, and Arthur's brother Crompton Llewelyn Davies as their guardians. Barrie told the boys after her death that she had been engaged to him, but Jack and Peter later expressed scepticism of this report.

Her son Peter was the publisher of her niece Daphne du Maurier's book about their grandfather, The Young George du Maurier: A Selection of His Letters, 1860–67 (1951).

She was portrayed by Ann Bell in the miniseries The Lost Boys (1978) and Kate Winslet in the film Finding Neverland (2004). Winslet was nominated for a British Academy Film Award and a Critics' Choice Movie Award for her performance. She was also portrayed by Rosalie Craig, Laura Michelle Kelly, and Christine Dwyer in the 2010s stage musical adaptation of the film.
