= Margaret Llewelyn Davies =

General secretary of the Co-operative Women's Guild

- Born: Margaret Caroline Llewelyn Davies; 16 October 1861; Marylebone, London, England
- Died: 28 May 1944 (aged 82); Dorking, England
- Occupation: Activist
- Office: General Secretary of the Co-operative Women's Guild (1889–1921)
- Movement: Christian socialism; cooperativism
- Parents: John Llewelyn Davies; Mary Crompton
- Relatives: Arthur Llewelyn Davies (brother); Theodora Llewelyn Davies (niece)

Margaret Caroline Llewelyn Davies (16 October 1861 – 28 May 1944) was a British social activist who served as general secretary of the Co-operative Women's Guild from 1889 until 1921. Her election has been described as a "turning point" in the organization's history, increasing its political activity and beginning an era of unprecedented growth and success. Catherine Webb considered Davies's retirement such a significant loss for the Guild that she began writing The Woman with the Basket, a history of the Guild to that time.

Davies compiled Maternity: Letters from Working Women (1915), a book based on letters from Guild members about their experiences of pregnancy, childbirth and raising children. She was the editor of Life as we have Known it (1931), a collection of Guild members' reflections, which included an introduction by her friend Virginia Woolf. Davies was a prominent and dedicated pacifist of her era.

== Early life ==
Margaret Caroline Llewelyn Davies was born on 16 October 1861 in Marylebone, London, the youngest of seven children born to Mary (née Crompton) and John Llewelyn Davies. Davies' parents were involved in radical intellectual movements when she was a child. Her father was the vicar of Christ Church in Marylebone, as well as a fellow of Trinity College and an outspoken foe of poverty and inequality, active in Christian socialist groups, and was also involved in the early co-operative movement. Her aunt, Emily Davies, helped found Girton College, Cambridge, where Margaret studied from 1881 to 1883, after attending Queen's College, London. Many of her extended family were also politically active, especially around the issue of women's suffrage.

== Career ==
Davies worked as a voluntary sanitary inspector and was impressed by the co-operative theory of the Rochdale Society of Equitable Pioneers. She joined the Marylebone Co-operative Society in 1886, and shortly afterward was elected as secretary of the Marylebone group of the Co-operative Women's Guild. A year later, she was elected to the Guild's national executive committee. Davies and her friend Rosalind Mary Shore Smith researched profit-sharing workshops in 1888, and recommended against their adoption by the movement. She was appointed as general secretary of the Guild in 1889, retaining that role until 1921. During her tenure, the Guild became far more politically active than it previously had been. The same year that she became general secretary, the family moved to Kirkby Lonsdale, where her father was a rector at St Mary's Church. In Kirkby Lonsdale, Davies worked closely with Lilian Harris, who became the Guild's cashier in 1893 and its assistant secretary in 1901. Olive Banks wrote in her 1985 Biographical dictionary of British feminists that "it was soon obvious ... that Margaret had found more than a co-worker, for Lilian was to be her life-long friend and companion." In 1908, Davies's father retired, and Davies and Harris moved to Hampstead, where her father stayed with them until his death in 1916.

How little is it realised by economists and others that Co-operation is the beginning of a great revolution! The Movement shows in practice that there is nothing visionary or impossible in the aspirations of those who desire to see the Community in control, instead of the Capitalists. Under the Co-operative system, no individuals can make fortunes, Co-operators evidently believing, like the old writer, that "money is like muck, no good unless it is spread." No "profits" are made; the surplus, inseparable from trading, is shared among the purchasers, according to the amount each spends. Capital becomes the tool of labour, and not its master.

— Margaret Llewelyn Davies, Life as we have Known it (p. xii)

During Davies' term as general secretary, she oversaw an emphasis on achieving the fourth of the Guild's stated aims, "to improve the conditions of women all over the country." She encouraged the Guild's promotion of social reforms, including for women's suffrage, whilst activities like sewing classes were relegated by the organisation. From 1893, branches discussed women's suffrage and collected signatures for petitions supporting it. Her personal views, combining socialism and feminism, shaped the Guild's direction.

In 1909, (Note: the Oxford dictionary of National Biography has the year as 1909; Banks (1985) has it as 1910.) Davies gave evidence to a royal commission on divorce law reform, and the Guild began to advocate for divorce equality. At this time, for example, adultery could only be the basis for divorce if committed by a woman, not by her husband. In 1912 the Guild adopted a policy, supported by its annual congress, that a married couple should be allowed to divorce after a separation period of two years. This was objected to by some members of the co-operative movement, including its Roman Catholic members, and led to a stoppage of the annual grant of £400 to the Guild from the central board of the Co-operative Union. Davies stood by the policy as agreed by the congress, and the Guild's work was funded from branches until the restoration of the grant four years later. Davies was a committed pacifist, and the Guild took a pacifist position too. During World War I, Davies was elected the general council of the Union of Democratic Control.

In 1915 Davies compiled Maternity: Letters from Working Women, a book based on the letters from Guild members about their experiences of pregnancy, childbirth and raising children. In 1931, she was the editor of Life as we have Known it, a collection of Guild members' reflections, which included an introduction by Davies' friend Virginia Woolf.

Davies's election as general secretary was described by Jean Gaffin and David Thoms, authors of Caring & sharing: the centenary history of the Co-operative Women's Guild (1993), as a "turning point" in the organization's history; her tenure ushered in an era of unprecedented growth and success for the Guild. Davies was considered such a significant figure in the Guild, and her retirement such a loss, that Catherine Webb began writing The Woman with the Basket, a history of the Guild to that point. Harris retired at the same time as Davies. Neither Davies or Harris had been paid for their work for the Guild, which helped the organisation to remain financially stable even during the period when funding from the central board was suspended. Honora Enfield, who had been Davies's private secretary since 1917, succeeded Davies as general secretary.

== Later life and legacy ==
In 1944, historian G. D. H. Cole described Davies as "In terms of personal qualities and disinterested idealism ... by far the greatest woman who has been actively identified with the British Co-Operative Movement" and identifying her appointment as general secretary as the precursor to becoming "a really powerful progressive force." Author Mavis Curtis wrote that Davies "set the agenda for the Guild for thirty-two years when she retired in 1921" and that her "forceful personality and firmly held beliefs remained a guiding force in the Guid for many, many years." Banks considered that "although undoubtedly a profound influence on the guild, Davies was not an autocrat. Her particular talent was to draw out working-class women to speak or write of their own experiences." The authors of Davies's entry in the Dictionary of labour biography (1972) say that Davies "was largely responsible for developing the Women's Guild ... as a pressure group of considerable influence for women's rights." In her book Matriarchs of the movement: female leadership and gender politics within the English cooperative movement (2000), historian Barbara Blaszak says that earlier sources had failed to examine Davies's performance of the role of general secretary critically. She compares Davies to a colonial missionary, commenting that Davies imposed her own beliefs, shaped by her class and background as an unmarried woman without children, on to working class women, and ignored anyone within the Guild that disagreed with her. Blaszak ascribes Davies's position within the Guild to a talent for administration and following up on the ideas of others rather than to Davies possessing qualities of true leadership.

After retiring from the Guild, Davies continued to support the pacifist movement. She was a founder of the International Women's Co-operative Guild, with Enfield and others, in 1921. From 1924 to 1928, she was the chair of the Society for Cultural Relations with the USSR.

Davies and Harris moved to Dorking, where Davies died on 28 May 1944.

In a 2017 book review in The Times Literary Supplement, June Purvis wrote that Davies had been "largely forgotten ... it is good to be reminded that under her leadership the Women's Co-operative Guild campaigned not just for a living wage, equal divorce laws and improvements in welfare, but also for universal suffrage." In 2020, Margaret Llewelyn Davies: with women for a new world, a biography by Ruth Cohen, was published. There is a commemorative plaque to Davies on the house she lived with Harris and her father in, in Hampstead as well as in the churchyard of St Mary's Church, Kirkby Lonsdale.

== Notes ==
Non-profit organization positions
Preceded by Mary Lawrenson	Secretary of the Women's Co-operative Guild; 1889–1922	Succeeded by Honora Enfield
