= Ann Bell =

British actress (born 1938)

- Born: Ann Forrest Bell; 29 April 1938 (age 88); Wallasey, Cheshire, England
- Occupation: Actress
- Spouse: Robert Lang (m. 1971; died 2004)
- Children: 2

Ann Forrest Bell (born 29 April 1938) is a British actress, best known for playing war internee Marion Jefferson in the BBC Second World War drama series Tenko (1981– 84).

== Life and career ==
Ann Forrest Bell was born in Wallasey, Cheshire, on 29 April 1938, the daughter of John Forrest Bell and Marjorie (née Byrom) Bell. She was educated at Birkenhead High School.

Bell played the title role in a BBC adaptation of Jane Eyre (1963) in addition to many guest roles on television, including Edgar Wallace Mysteries, Gideon's Way, The Avengers, The Sentimental Agent, The Saint, Armchair Theatre, For Whom the Bell Tolls (1965), Danger Man, The Baron, Mystery and Imagination, The Troubleshooters, Callan, Journey to the Unknown, Sherlock Holmes (the 1968 episode "The Sign of Four" with Peter Cushing), Department S, The Lost Boys, Enemy at the Door, Shoestring, Tumbledown, Blackeyes, Heartbeat, Inspector Morse, Agatha Christie's Poirot, Midsomer Murders, Casualty, Holby City, The Forsyte Saga, The Bill and Waking the Dead. In 1968 she appeared in the Dennis Potter play Shaggy Dog, part of The Company of Five, a London Weekend Television anthology series of six plays featuring the same five actors. Many of her film appearances were for Hammer Film Productions such as The Witches (1966).

She was married to character actor Robert Lang, another Hammer regular, from 1971 until his death in 2004. The couple had two children. Bell appeared on screen with Lang in Tenko Reunion, in which he played Teddy Forster-Brown. They also appeared together in an episode of Heartbeat ("Bread and Circuses", 2002).

In 2010, Bell featured in the Doctor Who audio drama A Thousand Tiny Wings as well as the 2012 audio play Night of the Stormcrow which also featured her Tenko castmate Louise Jameson.

== Filmography ==
- A Midsummer Night's Dream (1959) – Hermia (voice)
- Edgar Wallace Mysteries – "Flat Two" episode (1962) – Susan
- Stopover Forever (1964) – Sue Chambers
- Dr. Terror's House of Horrors (1965) – Ann Rogers (segment "Creeping Vine")
- Fahrenheit 451 (1966) – Doris (uncredited)
- The Witches (1966) – Sally Benson
- The Shuttered Room (1967) – Mary Whately, Susannah's Mother
- To Sir, with Love (1967) – Mrs. Dare
- A Testing Job (1968, educational film) – Mrs Bell
- Sherlock Holmes Episode The Sign of the Four (1968) - Mary Morstan
- The Reckoning (1970) – Rosemary Marler
- The Statue (1971) – Pat Demarest
- Spectre (1977, TV Movie) – Anitra Cyon
- Champions (1984) – Valda Embiricos
- Head Over Heels (1993, TV Series) – Gracie Ellis
- When Saturday Comes (1996) – Sarah Muir
- The Ice House (1997, TV Mini-Series) – Molly Phillips
- The Land Girls (1998) – Philip's Mother
- Up at the Villa (2000) – Beryl Bryson
- The Last Hangman (2005) – Violet Van Der Elst
