= Michael Llewelyn Davies =

Inspiration for Peter Pan (1900–1921)

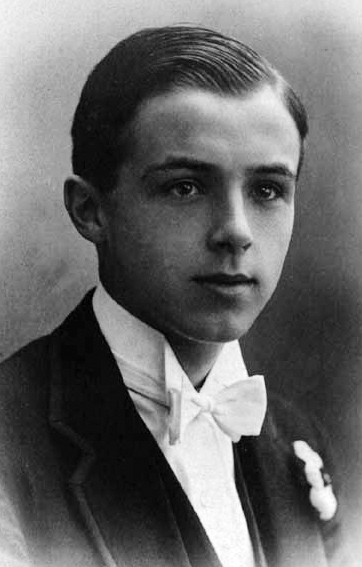
- Davies in 1917 at age 17
- Born: 16 June 1900; London, England
- Died: 19 May 1921 (aged 20); Sandford-on-Thames, England
- Occupation: Student
- Known for: Foster son of J. M. Barrie
- Parents: Arthur Llewelyn Davies (father); Sylvia du Maurier (mother)

Michael Llewelyn Davies (16 June 1900 – 19 May 1921) was – along with his four brothers – the inspiration for J. M. Barrie's characters Peter Pan, the Darling brothers, and the Lost Boys. Late in life, his only surviving brother Nico described him as "the cleverest of us, the most original, the potential genius." He died in ambiguous circumstances, drowning with a close friend – and possible lover – just short of his twenty-first birthday. He was a first cousin of English writer Daphne du Maurier.

== Early life and Peter Pan ==
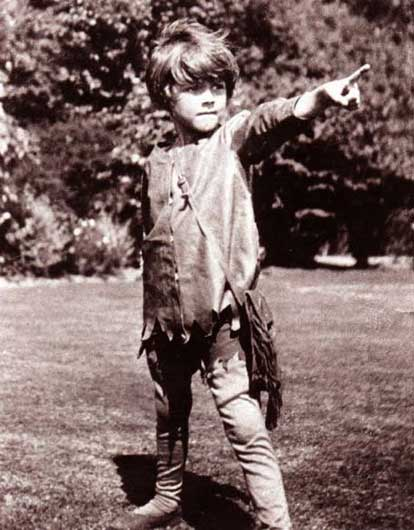
Davies dressed as Peter Pan at age 6

Michael was the fourth of five sons of Arthur and Sylvia Llewelyn Davies. He was born three years after Barrie became friends with his older brothers and mother in 1897. He and his eldest brother George were the boys closest to Barrie, and he is widely reported as the individual who most influenced the portrayal of Peter Pan in the 1911 novel based on the play. He was an infant as Barrie was writing the first appearance of Peter Pan as a newborn in The Little White Bird. He was four and a half years old when Peter Pan, or The Boy Who Wouldn't Grow Up debuted in December 1904. The following winter, he was ill for several months, so in February 1906, Barrie and producer Charles Frohman brought scenery and some of the cast to the family's home in Berkhamsted to perform the play for him. Barrie began writing a sequel to Peter Pan about the boy's brother, to be entitled Michael Pan, but instead incorporated this material (such as the hero's nightmares) into the novel Peter and Wendy.

The statue of Peter Pan in Kensington Gardens, erected in secret during the night of 30 April 1912, was meant to be modelled upon photographs of Michael Llewelyn Davies at the age of six, dressed as the character. However, sculptor George Frampton used a different child as his model, leaving Barrie very disappointed with the result. "It doesn't show the devil in Peter," the writer said.

Barrie became guardian of Davies and his brothers following the deaths of their father in 1907 and mother in 1910. Davies and Barrie remained very close as Davies grew up and went away to school, particularly after his eldest brother George died in combat in Flanders during World War I in 1915. His youngest brother Nico later described Michael and George as "the Ones", the boys who meant the most to Barrie. Davies attended Eton College, where he had difficulty adjusting to life away from his family, and he exchanged letters daily with "Uncle Jim" Barrie. He also suffered from nightmares, which he had experienced since childhood. Nonetheless, he made a number of friends and excelled at his studies, including art and writing poetry, and was generally described as a "brilliant boy", one destined for great things.

== Adulthood ==
Rupert Buxton in 1920

After finishing at Eton, Davies attended Christ Church, Oxford, where he continued to correspond regularly with Barrie. He briefly decided to study art at the University of Paris, but returned to Oxford. Several friends from Eton joined him there, but he also became very close to Rupert Buxton, the son of Sir Thomas Fowell Victor Buxton, 4th Baronet and a former pupil of Harrow School. The two became inseparable friends, spending time both at the university and on holiday together. Buxton was also a poet, and had an interest in acting. Buxton was one of the few friends of Davies whom Barrie reported getting along with.

In an interview taped in 1976, Conservative politician Robert Boothby, who had been a close friend of Davies at Eton and Oxford, spoke about Davies' relationships during this time. When asked if Davies were homosexual, Boothby – who was reported by newspapers to have had homosexual relationships as an adult – replied it was "a phase... I think he might have come out of it." Boothby also said, "I don't think Michael had any girlfriends, but our friendship wasn't homosexual. I believe it was – fleetingly – between him and Senhouse". (Roger Senhouse was a friend of Davies at both Eton and Oxford.) Boothby reported that he had discouraged Davies' relationship with Buxton, warning of "a feeling of doom" he had about him. Although Boothby criticised the relationship between Davies and his surrogate father Barrie as "morbid" and "unhealthy", he dismissed the notion that there was a sexual aspect to it. However, he admitted that there had been a sexual relationship between Davies and Buxton.

== Death ==
Newspaper report of Davies' drowning

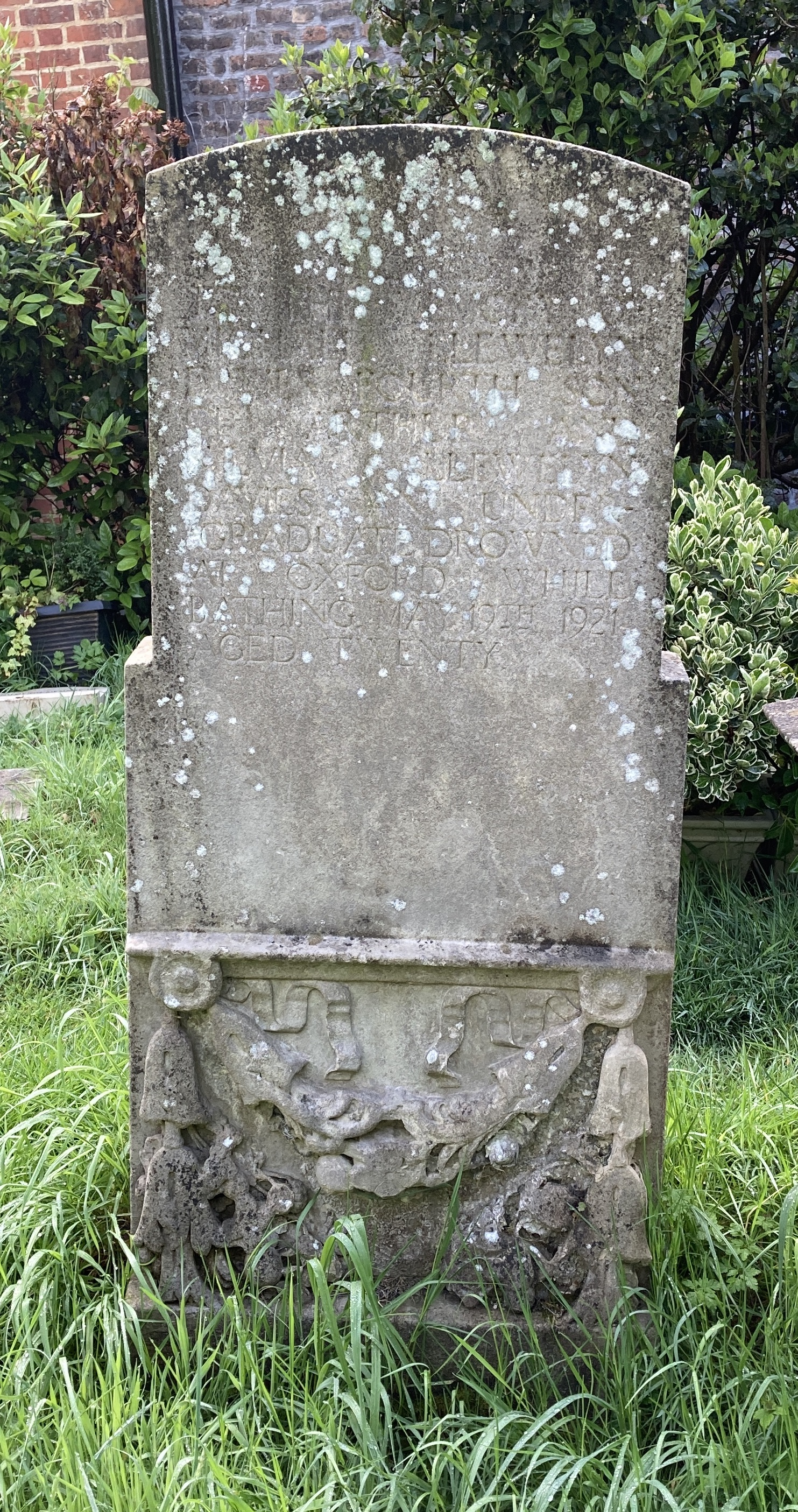
Michael Llewelyn Davies's grave at St John-at-Hampstead churchyard

About a month before Davies's 21st birthday, he and Buxton drowned together in Sandford Lasher, a pool of water downstream of a weir near Sandford Lock on the River Thames, a few miles from Oxford.

The closeness of Davies and Buxton, combined with the uncertain circumstances of their deaths, led to speculation that the pair had died in a suicide pact. Dangerous currents in Sandford Lasher had made the pool notorious as a drowning hazard – there were warning signs and a conspicuous 19th-century memorial to previous victims. Despite this, the pair had gone swimming there before.

The water was 20 to 30 feet (6 to 9 m) deep, but calm. Buxton was a good swimmer, but Davies had a fear of water and could not swim proficiently. A witness at the coroner's inquest reported that one man was swimming to join the other, who was sitting on a stone on the weir, but he experienced "difficulties" and the other dived in to reach him. However, the witness also reported, when he saw their heads together in the water they did not appear to be struggling. Their bodies were recovered "clasped" together the next day (sometimes misreported later as "tied together"). The coroner's conclusion was Davies had drowned accidentally, and Buxton had drowned trying to save him.

The Oxford Magazine published the following in an obituary for the pair:

Two House men whose loss would have been more widely and more deeply mourned, it would be impossible to find. They were intimate friends, and in their death they were not divided. It is we who must learn to live without them.

Barrie wrote a year later that Davies's death "was in a way the end of me."

Davies's brothers Peter and Nico each later acknowledged suicide as a likely explanation, as did Barrie. Although Boothby, in 1976, described Buxton as having "an almost suicidal streak about him," he did not take a definite stand on whether Buxton had died trying to save Davies and/or impulsively joined him going under, or whether they had in fact died as the result of a suicide pact.

== In media ==
In the 1978 BBC mini-series The Lost Boys, he is portrayed at various ages by Sebastian Buss, Paul Spurrier, Alexander Buss, Charles Tatnall, and William Relton.

The 1988 play The Death of Peter Pan (by Australian playwright Barry Lowe) is based on Davies's life and focuses on his relationship with Rupert Buxton. A third season was produced in 2012 at Chapel Off Chapel Theatre in Melbourne, Australia.

In the 2004 film Finding Neverland, he is portrayed by Luke Spill.

In the 2013 play "Peter and Alice", he appears in a scene with Barrie, who disapproves of Davies's relationship with Buxton. Shortly after, Davies commits suicide. He is portrayed by Stefano Braschi.
