= Finding Neverland (film) =

2004 historical drama film by Marc Forster

- Theatrical release poster
- Directed by: Marc Forster
- Screenplay by: David Magee
- Based on: The Man Who Was Peter Pan by Allan Knee
- Produced by: Richard N. Gladstein; Nellie Bellflower
- Starring: Johnny Depp; Kate Winslet; Julie Christie; Radha Mitchell; Dustin Hoffman
- Cinematography: Roberto Schaefer
- Edited by: Matt Chesse
- Music by: Jan A. P. Kaczmarek
- Production company: FilmColony
- Distributed by: Miramax Films (United States); Miramax International (Internationally; through Buena Vista International)
- Release dates: September 4, 2004 (Venice); October 29, 2004 (United Kingdom); December 17, 2004 (United States)
- Running time: 101 minutes
- Countries: United Kingdom; United States
- Language: English
- Budget: $25 million
- Box office: $116.8 million

Finding Neverland is a 2004 biographical drama film, directed by Marc Forster and written by David Magee, based on the 1998 play The Man Who Was Peter Pan by Allan Knee. It depicts the life of British author and playwright J. M. Barrie and the family who inspired him to create Peter Pan. The film stars Johnny Depp, Kate Winslet, Julie Christie, Radha Mitchell, and Dustin Hoffman.

Finding Neverland premiered at the Venice Film Festival on September 4, 2004, and was released in the United Kingdom on October 29, 2004, and the United States on December 17, 2004, by Miramax Films. It was a box office success, grossing $116.8 million worldwide. The film earned seven nominations at the 77th Academy Awards, including Best Picture, Best Adapted Screenplay, and Best Actor for Depp, and won for Best Original Score. The film was the inspiration for the stage musical of the same name in 2012.

== Plot ==
In 1903, following the dismal reception of his latest play, Little Mary, James Matthew Barrie meets the widowed Sylvia and her four young sons (George, Jack, Peter and Michael) in Kensington Gardens. A strong friendship develops among them. Barrie proves to be a great playmate and surrogate father figure for the boys, and their imaginative antics give him ideas that he incorporates into a play about boys who do not want to grow up, in particular one named after troubled young Peter Llewelyn Davies. Although Barrie sees this family as wonderful and inspirational, others question his relationship with the Llewelyn Davies family. Barrie's wife Mary divorces him and Sylvia's mother Emma du Maurier objects to the time that he spends with the Llewelyn Davies family. Emma also seeks to control her daughter and grandsons, especially as Sylvia weakens from an unidentified illness.

Producer Charles Frohman agrees to mount Peter Pan, despite his belief that it holds no appeal for upper class theatergoers. Barrie peppers the opening night audience with children from a nearby orphanage, and the adults react to their delight with an appreciation of their own. The play proves to be a huge success. Barrie is all set for his play, but when Peter arrives alone to the play, he goes to Sylvia's house to check up on her, and misses the show. Peter attends the play and realizes it is really about his brothers and Barrie.

Barrie arranges to have an abridged production of it performed in the Llewelyn Davies house. At the end of the play, Peter Pan points to the back doors and implies that Sylvia should go off to Neverland. She takes the hands of her boys and slowly walks out.

The following scene takes place at Sylvia's funeral. Barrie discovers that her will says that he and her mother should look after the boys, an arrangement agreeable to both parties. The film ends with J. M. Barrie comforting Peter on the bench in the park where they had first met.

== Cast ==
- Johnny Depp as Sir J. M. Barrie
- Kate Winslet as Sylvia Llewelyn Davies
- Julie Christie as Mrs. Emma du Maurier, Sylvia's mother.
- Radha Mitchell as Mary Ansell Barrie, James Barrie's wife. Mitchell starred in Forster's Everything Put Together.
- Dustin Hoffman as Charles Frohman, the producer of Peter Pan
- Kelly Macdonald as "Peter Pan"
- Ian Hart as Sir Arthur Conan Doyle, James Barrie's friend.
- Eileen Essell as Mrs. Snow
- Paul Whitehouse as the Stage Manager
- Freddie Highmore as Peter Llewelyn Davies, Sylvia's third son.
- Joe Prospero as Jack Llewelyn Davies, Sylvia's second son.
- Nick Roud as George Llewelyn Davies, Sylvia's first son.
- Luke Spill as Michael Llewelyn Davies, Sylvia's fourth son.
- Oliver Fox as Gilbert Cannan, Mary's lover.
- Mackenzie Crook as Mr. Jaspers, the theatre usher. Crook appeared with Depp in Pirates of the Caribbean: The Curse of the Black Pearl.
- Angus Barnett as "Nana"/Mr. Reilly. Barnett appeared with Depp in Pirates of the Caribbean: The Curse of the Black Pearl.
- Toby Jones as "Smee"
- Kate Maberly as "Wendy Darling"
- Matt Green as "John Darling"
- Catrin Rhys as "Michael Darling"
- Tim Potter as "Captain Hook"/"George Darling"
- Jane Booker as "Mary Darling"
- Jimmy Gardner as Mr. Snow
- Murray McArthur as the Stagehand

== Production ==
Finding Neverland was originally scheduled to be released in autumn 2003. Universal Pictures, which owned the film rights to Barrie's original play and was adapting it for cinema release the same year, refused to allow Miramax Films to use scenes from the play in Finding Neverland if it were released the same year. Miramax Films agreed to delay the release, in exchange for the rights to reproduce in the film scenes from the stage production. Finding Neverland opened in 2004, 100 years after Barrie's play opened.

Richmond Theatre in Richmond upon Thames doubled as the Duke of York's Theatre, the venue in which Peter Pan was first presented. Exterior scenes were filmed in Hyde Park, Brompton Cemetery and Kensington Gardens. According to commentary on the DVD release, the structure used as Barrie's summer cottage was located near Kent. Interiors were filmed in the Pinewood Studios in Buckinghamshire, and the Shepperton Studios in Surrey.

Filming occurred in various places in the United Kingdom. Production shot a short fantasy sequence at the Laredo Wild West Town in Kent. The town is featured in multiple fantasy-playing sessions set in the Wild West, when Barrie (Johnny Depp) plays with the Llewellyn Davies boys.

Dustin Hoffman had previously appeared in the title role of Hook (1991), the Peter Pan sequel film by Steven Spielberg. The screenplay for Finding Neverland had originally included a scene in which his character, the play's sceptical producer, was to put on the Captain Hook costume and read some of his lines to point out how silly he found it. Hoffman objected to this, so the scene was rewritten for him to simply read aloud and ridicule character names from the play.

Eileen Essell, 82 years old at the time, made one of her first feature film appearances. She also followed Depp to a role in Charlie and the Chocolate Factory.

Freddie Highmore's performance in Finding Neverland led Depp to suggest him to Tim Burton for Charlie and the Chocolate Factory, in which he played Charlie Bucket and Depp played Willy Wonka.

== Release ==
The film premiered at the Venice Film Festival. It was shown at the Telluride Film Festival, the Haifa Film Festival, the Athens Panorama European Film Festival, the Mill Valley Film Festival, the Chicago International Film Festival and the Leeds International Film Festival, before opening in the U.K. 29 October 2004.

It had a limited release in the United States 12 November 2004, and opened more widely 17 December 2004.

== Reception ==
=== Box office ===
The film was budgeted at $25 million. It grossed $51,676,606 in the U.S., and $63 million in other markets, for a total worldwide box-office tally of $115,036,108.

=== Critical reception ===
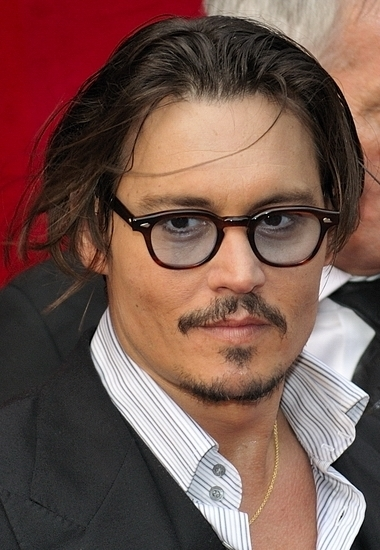
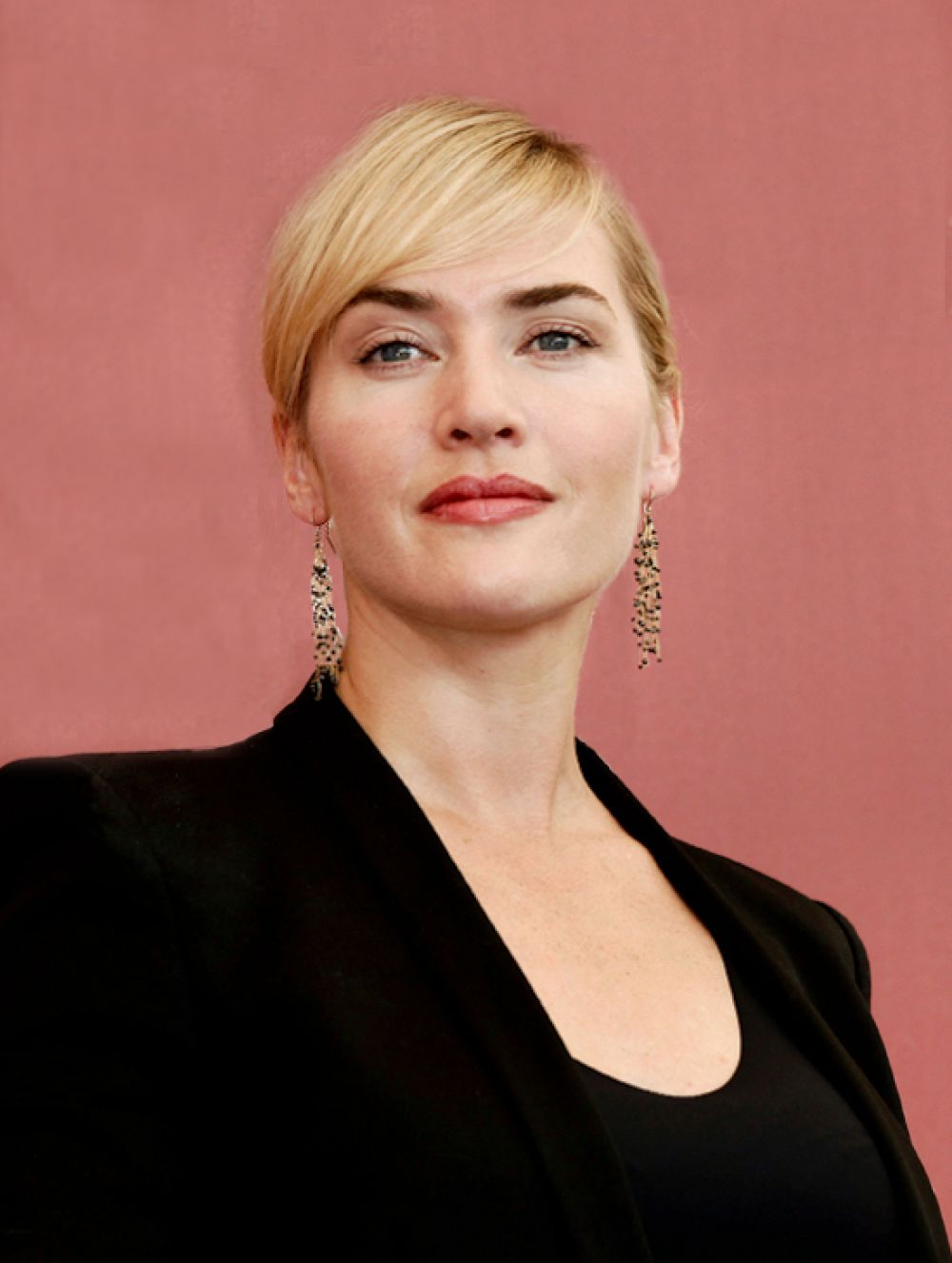
The performances of Johnny Depp and Kate Winslet garnered critical acclaim, earning them BAFTA nominations for Best Actor and Best Actress respectively.

On the review aggregation website Rotten Tomatoes, Finding Neverland has an approval rating of 83%, based on 206 reviews, with an average rating of 7.47/10. The website's consensus states: "It won't pass muster for those looking for historical accuracy, but Finding Neverland is a warm, heartfelt drama with a charm all its own — and Johnny Depp gives a graceful performance as Peter Pan creator J.M. Barrie." Metacritic assigned the film a weighted average score of 67 out of 100, based on 38 critics, indicating "generally favorable" reviews. Audiences polled by CinemaScore gave the film a grade of "A" on a scale of A+ to F.

In her review in The Times, Wendy Ide called the film "charming but rather idiosyncratic", and added, "A mixture of domestic drama, tragedy and exuberant fantasy, the film blends moist-eyed nostalgia with the cruel disappointments of a marriage break-up; a childlike playfulness and unpredictability with a portrait of a treacherously unforgiving and rigid Edwardian society. It could appeal to everyone from preteens to pensioners, or it could appeal to no one at all. Ultimately this unconventionality is probably one of the film's main strengths. And if the tone veers a little haphazardly between fantasy and cold, hard reality, well, perhaps that is the most effective way of taking us into the mind of the film's mercurial protagonist."

Manohla Dargis of The New York Times said it "is the kind of film where even the smallest crack has been sealed. Instead of real quirks, strange habits, moments of everyday gas, gurgle and grunting, movies like this give us sumptuous production design, meticulous costumes and stories meant to leave us dewy-eyed and thoughtful, if never actually disturbed... The problem isn't the liberties the filmmakers take with reality, but that this isn't an engaging bowdlerization... Johnny Depp neither soars nor crashes, but moseys forward with vague purpose and actorly restraint... [he] and Ms. Winslet are pleasant to watch, as are the actors who play the Davies boys, but they haven't been pushed to their limits."

In the San Francisco Chronicle, Mick LaSalle observed that the film "ends so beautifully, so poignantly and so aptly that there's a big temptation to forget that most of what precedes the ending is tiresome drivel, that Johnny Depp's performance... is precious and uninsightful, and that almost all the movie's magic derives directly from scenes lifted from Barrie's play. Winslet's no-nonsense strength is especially appreciated... Another actress would have followed Depp into the quicksand of faux-poetic self-indulgence. But Winslet is direct, grounded and heartfelt in a recognizably human way. Dustin Hoffman, as Barrie's producer, also steers clear of Depp's rhythms, though he has trouble deciding whether the producer is British or American."

Peter Travers of Rolling Stone rated the film 3½ stars out of 4, and called it "glorious entertainment... magical, not mush". About Depp, he said, "It's too early to speculate on how [he] will grow as an actor. Based on Finding Neverland, it's not too early to call him a great one."

In the St. Petersburg Times, Steve Persall gave the film a "B" grade, and commented, "A first viewing of Finding Neverland was tear-inducing and completely satisfying. Seeing it again was a mistake, less of my own than Forster's, who didn't make a movie that can sustain its magic beyond first impressions. Problems with David Magee's screenplay that initially could be shrugged off—occasionally slow pacing, melodramatic plot twists—became glaring. With familiarity, the fantasy simply wasn't as fanciful. It felt like growing up, and it was disappointing. On the other hand, many of the film's qualities are too strong to falter, starting with another fascinating man-child performance by Johnny Depp as Barrie."

Carina Chocano of the Los Angeles Times described the film as "gently seductive, genuinely tender and often moving without being maudlin", and added, "Depp and Winslet share a rare combination of airiness, earthiness and sharp, wry intelligence."

== Accolades ==
Award	Category	Nominee	Result
77th Academy Awards	Best Picture	Richard N. Gladstein and Nellie Bellflower	Nominated
77th Academy Awards	Best Actor	Johnny Depp	Nominated
77th Academy Awards	Best Adapted Screenplay	David Magee	Nominated
77th Academy Awards	Best Art Direction	Art Direction: Gemma Jackson; Set Decoration: Trisha Edwards	Nominated
77th Academy Awards	Best Costume Design	Alexandra Byrne	Nominated
77th Academy Awards	Best Film Editing	Matt Chesse	Nominated
77th Academy Awards	Best Original Score	Jan A. P. Kaczmarek	Won
58th British Academy Film Awards	Best Film	Richard N. Gladstein; Nellie Bellflower	Nominated
58th British Academy Film Awards	Best Direction	Marc Forster	Nominated
58th British Academy Film Awards	Best Actor in a Leading Role	Johnny Depp	Nominated
58th British Academy Film Awards	Best Actress in a Leading Role	Kate Winslet	Nominated
58th British Academy Film Awards	Best Actress in a Supporting Role	Julie Christie	Nominated
58th British Academy Film Awards	Best Adapted Screenplay	David Magee	Nominated
58th British Academy Film Awards	Best Cinematography	Roberto Schaefer	Nominated
58th British Academy Film Awards	Best Film Music	Jan A.P. Kaczmarek	Nominated
58th British Academy Film Awards	Best Production Design	Gemma Jackson	Nominated
58th British Academy Film Awards	Best Makeup	Christine Blundell	Nominated
Broadcast Film Critics Association Awards 2004	Top 10 Films	Finding Neverland	Won
Broadcast Film Critics Association Awards 2004	Best Film	Finding Neverland	Nominated
Broadcast Film Critics Association Awards 2004	Best Director	Marc Forster	Nominated
Broadcast Film Critics Association Awards 2004	Best Actor	Johnny Depp	Nominated
Broadcast Film Critics Association Awards 2004	Best Supporting Actress	Kate Winslet	Nominated
Broadcast Film Critics Association Awards 2004	Best Young Performer	Freddie Highmore	Won
Broadcast Film Critics Association Awards 2004	Best Writer	David Magee	Nominated
62nd Golden Globe Awards	Best Motion Picture – Drama	Finding Neverland	Nominated
62nd Golden Globe Awards	Best Director	Marc Forster	Nominated
62nd Golden Globe Awards	Best Actor – Motion Picture Drama	Johnny Depp	Nominated
62nd Golden Globe Awards	Best Screenplay	David Magee	Nominated
62nd Golden Globe Awards	Best Original Score	Jan A.P. Kaczmarek	Nominated
London Film Critics Circle Awards 2004	Best British Film	Finding Neverland	Nominated
London Film Critics Circle Awards 2004	Best Actor	Johnny Depp	Nominated
London Film Critics Circle Awards 2004	Best Screenwriter	David Magee	Nominated
London Film Critics Circle Awards 2004	Best British Newcomer	Freddie Highmore	Nominated
11th Screen Actors Guild Awards	Outstanding Performance by a Male Actor in a Leading Role	Johnny Depp	Nominated
11th Screen Actors Guild Awards	Outstanding Performance by a Male Actor in a Supporting Role	Freddie Highmore	Nominated
11th Screen Actors Guild Awards	Outstanding Performance by a Cast in a Motion Picture	Julie Christie; Johnny Depp; Freddie Highmore; Dustin Hoffman; Radha Mitchell; Joe Prospero; Nick Roud; Luke Spill; Kate Winslet	Nominated
National Board of Review Awards 2004	Top Ten Films	Finding Neverland	Won
National Board of Review Awards 2004	Best Film	Finding Neverland	Won
National Board of Review Awards 2004	Outstanding Film Music Composition	Jan A.P. Kaczmarek	Won

== In other media ==
=== Theatre ===
On 6 February 2011, La Jolla Playhouse, California, announced that it would produce a new stage musical based on the film, with the book by Allan Knee, score by Scott Frankel and Michael Korie, and directed and choreographed by Rob Ashford. A planned production at La Jolla Playhouse was not held. A developmental reading was held in New York 31 March 2011 with Julian Ovenden, Kelli O'Hara, Tony Roberts, Mary Beth Peil, Michael Cumpsty and Meredith Patterson, directed by Ashford. The adaptation had its world premiere 22 September 2012 at Curve in Leicester. Directed by Rob Ashford, it stars Julian Ovenden as J. M. Barrie, and West End actress Rosalie Craig as Sylvia Llewelyn Davies.

On 14 August 2014, it was announced that the show would transfer to Broadway in March 2015. The show played at the Lunt-Fontanne Theatre. On 10 November 2014, it was announced that Tony, Emmy and Golden Globe-nominee Matthew Morrison would take Jordan's place in the portrayal of J. M. Barrie in the production's 2015 move to Broadway. Kelsey Grammer starred as Charles Frohman, and Laura Michelle Kelly reprised her role of Sylvia Llewelyn Davies.
