= Peter Pan (play and novel) =

1904 play and 1911 novel by J. M. Barrie

Peter Pan; or, The Boy Who Wouldn't Grow Up
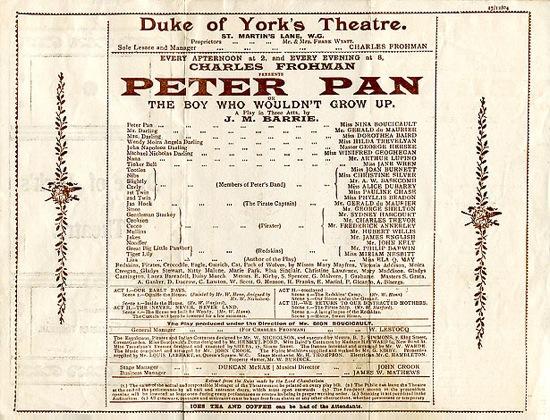
- 1904 programme for original play
- Original language: English
- Written by: J. M. Barrie

Premiere
- Date: 27 December 1904
- Place: Duke of York's Theatre, London

Peter and Wendy
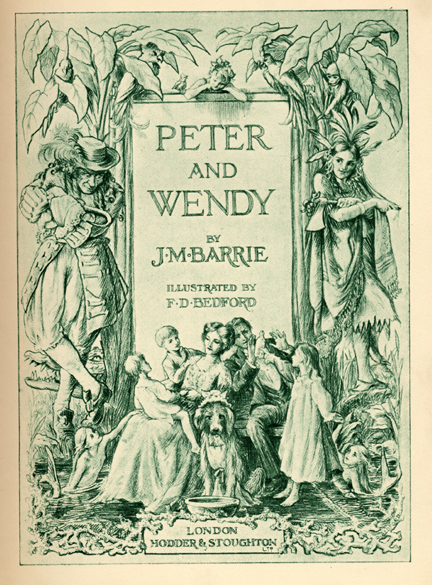
- Title page, 1911 UK edition
- Author: J. M. Barrie
- Illustrator: F. D. Bedford
- Language: English
- Genre: Fantasy. Children's literature
- Publisher: Hodder & Stoughton (UK); Charles Scribner's Sons (US)
- Publication date: 18 October 1911
- Publication place: United Kingdom
- Media type: Print
- Pages: 267 pp.; Frontispiece and 11 half-tone plates
- Preceded by: The Little White Bird; Peter Pan in Kensington Gardens
- Text: Peter and Wendy at Wikisource

Peter Pan; or, The Boy Who Wouldn't Grow Up, often known simply as Peter Pan, is a work by Scottish novelist J. M. Barrie, in the form of a 1904 play and a 1911 novel titled Peter and Wendy. Both versions tell the story of Peter Pan, a mischievous little boy who can fly, and has many adventures on the island of Neverland that is inhabited by mermaids, fairies, Native Americans and pirates. The Peter Pan stories also involve the characters Wendy Darling and her two younger brothers John and Michael, Peter's fairy Tinker Bell, the Lost Boys, and the pirate Captain Hook. The play and novel were inspired by Barrie's friendship with the Llewelyn Davies family.

The play debuted at the Duke of York's Theatre in London on 27 December 1904 with Nina Boucicault, daughter of the playwright Dion Boucicault, in the title role. A Broadway production was mounted in 1905 starring Maude Adams. It was later revived with such actresses as Marilyn Miller and Eva Le Gallienne. Barrie continued to revise the play for years after its debut until publication of the play script in 1928, under the name Peter Pan; or, The Boy Who Would Not Grow Up.

Prior to the publication of Barrie's novel, the play was first adapted into the 1907 novelisation The Peter Pan Picture Book, written by Daniel O'Connor and illustrated by Alice B. Woodward. This was also the first illustrated version of the story. The novel was first published on 18 October 1911 by Hodder & Stoughton in the UK, and on 21 October in the US by Charles Scribner’s Sons. The original book contains a frontispiece and 11 half-tone plates by the artist F. D. Bedford. The novel was first abridged by May Byron in 1915, with Barrie's permission, and published under the title Peter Pan and Wendy, the first time this form was used. This version was illustrated by Mabel Lucie Attwell in 1921.

Since its original production, the story has been adapted as a pantomime, a stage musical, a television special, a live themed ice-skating show in the mid-1970s, and several films, including a 1924 silent film, a 1953 Disney animated film, and a 2003 live action film. The play is now rarely performed in its original form on stage in the UK, whereas pantomime adaptations are frequently staged around Christmas. In the U.S., the original version has also been supplanted in popularity by the 1954 musical version, which became popular on television. In 1929, Barrie gave the copyright of the Peter Pan works to Great Ormond Street Hospital, a children's hospital in London.

== Background ==
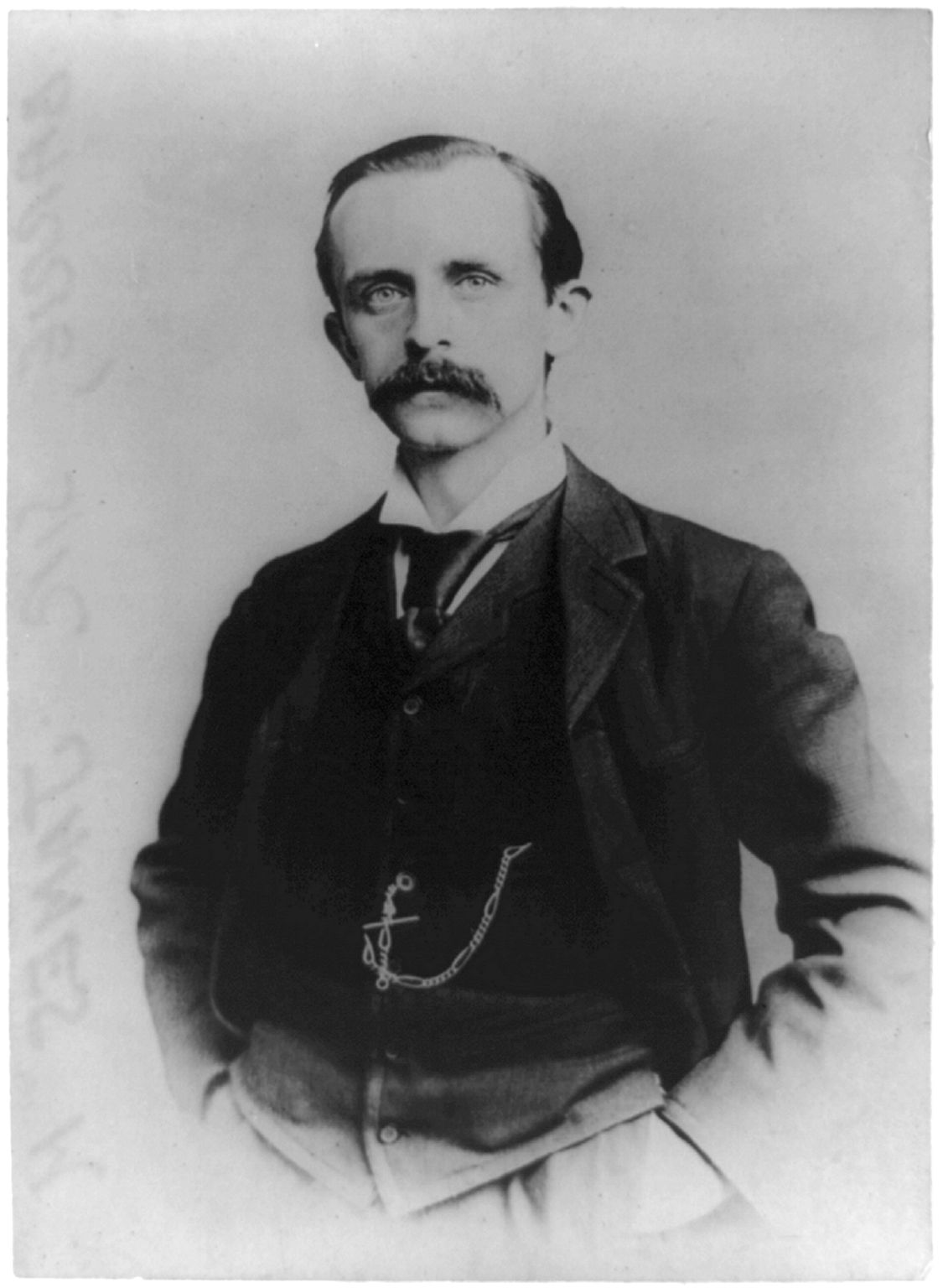
J. M. Barrie c. 1895

Barrie created Peter Pan in stories he told to the sons of his friend Sylvia Llewelyn Davies, with whom he had forged a special relationship. Mrs. Llewelyn Davies's death from cancer came within a few years after the death of her husband; Barrie was a co-guardian of the boys, and unofficially adopted them.

The character's name comes from two sources: Peter Llewelyn Davies, one of the boys, and Pan, the mischievous Greek god of the woodlands. Andrew Birkin has suggested that the inspiration for the character was Barrie's elder brother David, whose death in a skating accident at the age of fourteen deeply affected their mother. According to Birkin, the death was "a catastrophe beyond belief, and one from which she never fully recovered. If Margaret Ogilvy [Barrie's mother as the heroine of his 1896 novel of that title] drew a measure of comfort from the notion that David, in dying a boy, would remain a boy for ever, Barrie drew inspiration."

The Peter Pan character first appeared in print in the 1902 novel The Little White Bird, written for adults. The character was next used in the stage play Peter Pan, or The Boy Who Wouldn't Grow Up, which premiered in London on 27 December 1904 and became an instant success. In 1906, the chapters of The Little White Bird that featured the character of Peter Pan were published as the book Peter Pan in Kensington Gardens, with illustrations by Arthur Rackham.

Barrie then adapted the play into the 1911 novel Peter and Wendy, often now published simply as Peter Pan. The original draft of the play was entitled simply Anon: A Play. Barrie's working titles for it included The Great White Father and Peter Pan, or The Boy Who Hated Mothers. Producer Charles Frohman disliked the title on the manuscript, in answer to which Barrie reportedly suggested The Boy Who Couldn't Grow Up; Frohman suggested changing it to Wouldn't and dropping The Great White Father as a title.

== Plot summary ==
The play and its novelisation differ in some details of the story, but have much in common. In both versions, Peter Pan (Note: First introduced in Barrie's book The Little White Bird.) makes night-time calls on the Darlings' house in Bloomsbury, listening in on Mrs. Mary Darling's bedtime stories by the open window. One night Peter is spotted and, while trying to escape, he loses his shadow. On returning to claim it, Peter accidentally wakes Mary's daughter, Wendy. She succeeds in re-attaching his shadow to him using thread and needle, and Peter learns that she knows many bedtime stories. He invites her to Neverland to be a mother to his gang, the Lost Boys, children who were lost when they fell out of their prams. Wendy agrees, and her younger brothers John and Michael go along.

After their magical flight to Neverland, the children are blown out of the air by a pirate cannon. Wendy is nearly shot and killed by the Lost Boy Tootles because Peter's fairy companion, Tinker Bell, is jealous of her and tricks him into thinking that she is a bird. The only reason that Wendy is spared is because she is protected by an acorn pendant she wears around her neck given to Wendy by Peter in exchange for a "kiss" (actually a thimble) she gave him. Peter and the Lost Boys build a little house for Wendy to live in while she recuperates. (Note: A type of structure that to this day is called a Wendy house.) Soon John and Michael adopt the ways of the Lost Boys and all three of the Darling siblings begin to forget their parents and home.

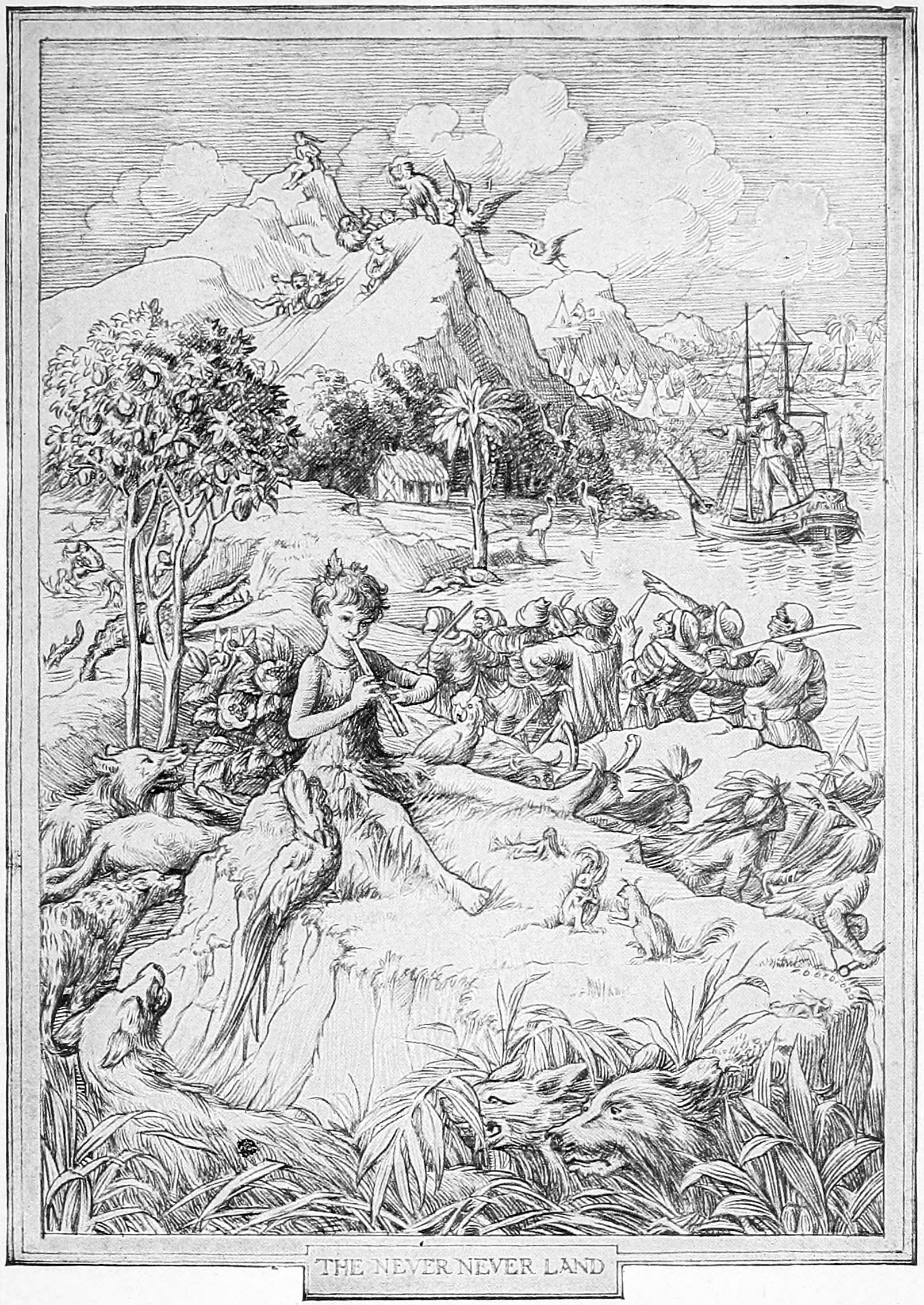
Illustration of Peter Pan playing the pipes in Neverland by F. D. Bedford from the first edition

Peter welcomes Wendy to his underground home, and she assumes the role of mother figure. Peter takes the Darlings on several adventures. At Mermaids' Lagoon, Peter and the Lost Boys save the Redskin Chief's daughter, Tiger Lily, from Marooner's Rock and become involved in a battle with the pirates, including Captain Hook, Peter's nemesis. He is named after the hook that replaced his right hand that Peter cut off in a fight. From thereon, Hook has been hunted by the crocodile which ate his hand after it fell into the water and now wants to eat the rest of him. The crocodile also swallowed a ticking clock, so Hook is wary of all ticking sounds. Peter is wounded when Hook claws him. He believes he will die, as the tide rises and Marooner's Rock will become submerged. However, "the Neverbird", a nearby mother bird, allows him to use her nest as a boat and Peter sails home.

In gratitude for Peter saving Tiger Lily, her tribe guards his home from the next imminent pirate attack. Meanwhile, Wendy begins to fall in love with Peter and asks him what kind of feelings he has for her. Peter says that he has "those of a devoted son", disappointing Wendy. One day, while telling stories to the Lost Boys and her brothers, Wendy recalls her parents and decides to return to England. Unbeknownst to Peter, Wendy and the boys are captured by Captain Hook, who massacres the Redskins and poisons Peter's "medicine" while the boy is asleep. When Peter awakes, he learns from Tinker Bell that Wendy has been kidnapped – in an effort to please Wendy, he goes to drink his medicine. Peter does not believe Tink about the poison (as he is confident the pirate could not have entered their secret lair without him noticing), so instead she drinks it herself, causing her near death. Tink says that she could be saved if children believed in fairies. In the play, Peter turns to the audience and begs those who believe in fairies to clap their hands. In the novel, Peter speaks to all the children currently asleep and dreaming of the Neverland.

En route to the ship, Peter encounters the crocodile, which is silent and Peter concludes the clock must have run down; Peter decides to copy the creature's tick, so any animals will recognise it and leave him unharmed. He does not realise that he is still mimicking the ticking as he boards the ship, where Hook and his crew cower, mistaking him for the crocodile. While the pirates search for the creature, Peter sneaks into the cabin to steal the keys and frees the Lost Boys. When the pirates investigate a noise in the cabin, Peter defeats them. When Peter reveals himself, he and Hook begin to battle, and Peter easily wins. He kicks Hook into the jaws of the waiting crocodile, and Hook dies with the satisfaction that Peter literally kicked him off the ship, which Hook considers "bad form". Peter takes control of the ship, and sails the seas back to London.

Before Wendy and her brothers arrive at their house, Peter flies ahead, to try and bar the window so Wendy will think her mother forgot her. However, after learning of Mrs. Darling's distress, he bitterly leaves the window open and flies away. The Darlings reunite with their parents. Wendy then presents all the lost boys to her parents, who decide to adopt them. Peter returns briefly, and meets Mrs. Darling. She offers to adopt Peter as well, but Peter refuses, afraid they will "catch him and make him a man." It is hinted that Mary knew Peter when she was a girl; she always has a kiss in the corner of her mouth no one can reach, but Peter takes it with him as he leaves.

Peter promises to return for Wendy and take her to Neverland for a week every spring. The play's final scene takes place a year later when Wendy is preparing to return there, after the spring cleaning has taken place. Tinker Bell has died during this year since fairies are short-lived creatures. However, Peter has already forgotten about Tinker Bell, the Lost Boys and even Hook when Wendy returns, and he does not understand Wendy's wistful wish that she could take him back with her.

=== Epilogue ===
Four years after the premiere of the original production of Peter Pan, Barrie wrote an additional scene entitled When Wendy Grew Up, An Afterthought, later included in the final chapter of Peter and Wendy, and later still published as a separate work in 1957.

In this scene, Peter returns for Wendy years later, but she is now grown up with a daughter of her own named Jane. It is also revealed that Wendy married a Lost Boy, although this is not mentioned in the novel, and it is never revealed which one she did marry. (Note: In the original draft of the play, it is mentioned that she married Tootles, although Barrie omitted this before publication.) When Peter learns that Wendy "betrayed" him by growing up, he is heartbroken until Jane agrees to come to Neverland as Peter's new mother. In the novel it is mentioned that when Jane grows up, Peter takes her daughter Margaret to Neverland. This cycle will go on forever as long as children are "gay and innocent and heartless". (Note: An Afterthought is only occasionally used in productions of the play, but was included in the musical production starring Mary Martin, and provided the premise for Disney's sequel to their animated adaptation of the story, Return to Never Land. This epilogue was filmed for the 2003 film but not included in the final version, though a rough cut of the sequence was included as an extra on the DVD of the film.)

== Characters ==
=== Peter Pan ===
Peter Pan is one of the protagonists of the play and the novel. He is described in the novel as a young boy who still has all his first teeth; he wears clothes made of leaves (autumn leaves in the play, skeleton leaves in the novel) and plays the pipes. He is the only boy able to fly without the help of Tinker Bell's fairy dust. He has refused to grow up and distrusts mothers as he felt betrayed by his own; in Barrie's original production, Peter describes how he attempted to return home only to find that the nursery window is closed and his mother had given birth to a new baby boy. He cares about Wendy, but can only see her as a motherly figure, not as a sweetheart. Barrie attributes this to "the riddle of his very being". He is very cocky and forgetful; as he needs to forget what he's learned through his adventures in order to maintain his "childlike wonder".

=== Darling family ===
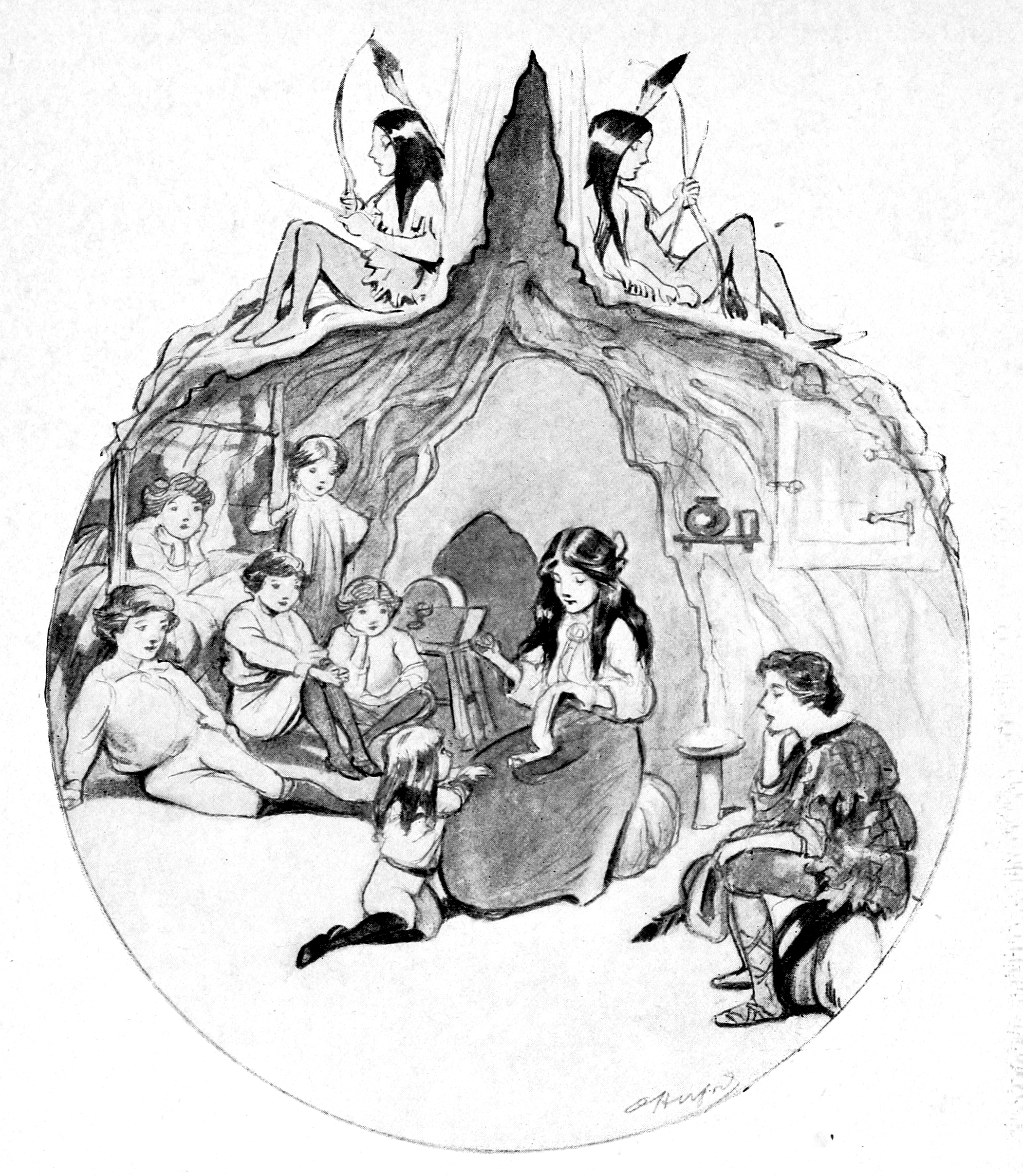
Wendy Darling by Oliver Herford, "The Peter Pan Alphabet", Charles Scribner's Sons, New York, 1907.

According to Barrie's description of the Darlings' house, the family lives in Bloomsbury, London.

- Wendy Darling – Wendy is the eldest child, their only daughter, and the protagonist of the novel. She loves the idea of homemaking and storytelling and wants to become a mother; her dreams consist of adventures in a little woodland house with her pet wolf. She bears a bit of (mutual) animosity toward Tiger Lily because of their similar affections toward Peter. She does not seem to feel the same way about Tinker Bell, but the fairy is constantly bad-mouthing her and even tries to have her killed. At the end of the novel, she has grown up and is married with a daughter (Jane) and a granddaughter (Margaret). She is portrayed variously with blonde, brown, or black hair in different stories. While it is not clear whether or not she is in love with Peter, one can assume that she does have some feelings toward him. Wendy is often referred to as the "mother" of the Lost Boys and, while Peter also considers her to be his "mother", he takes on the "father" role, hinting that they play a married couple in their games.

Several writers have stated that Barrie was the first to use the name Wendy in a published work, and that the source of the name was Barrie's childhood friend, Margaret Henley, 4-year-old daughter of poet William Ernest Henley, who pronounced the word "friend" as "Fwiendy", adapted by Barrie as "Wendy" in writing the play. There is some evidence that the name Wendy may be related to the Welsh name Gwendolyn, and it is also used as a diminutive variant of the eastern European name "Wanda", but prior to its use in the Peter Pan stories, the name was not used as an independent first name.

- John Darling – John is the middle child and eldest son. He gets along well with Wendy, but he often argues with Michael. He is fascinated with pirates, and he once thought of becoming "Redhanded Jack". He dreams of living in an inverted boat on the sands, where he has no friends and spends his time shooting flamingos. He looks up to Peter Pan, but at times they clash due to Peter's nature of showing off. He also looks up to his father and dreams of running his firm one day when he is grown up. When he is described as a grown-up it is said he is a "bearded man who doesn't know any story to tell his children". The character of John was named after Jack Llewelyn Davies.
- Michael Darling – Michael is the youngest child. He is approximately five years old, as he still wears the pinafores young Edwardian boys wear. He looks up to John and Wendy, dreaming of living in a wigwam where his friends visit at night. Michael is the first of the Darling children to forget their lives before the Neverland, as is the last of the boys (including the Lost Boys) to stop believing in Peter after their return. He grows up to be an engine-driver. He was named after Michael Llewelyn Davies.
- Mr. and Mrs. Darling – George and Mary Darling are the children's loving parents. Mr. Darling is a pompous, blustering clerk in the City but kind at heart. He feels extremely guilty over his children's disappearance and, as penance, spends all his time in Nana's kennel, even to and from work. Mary Darling is described as an intelligent, romantic lady. She is also said to have a kiss on the corner of her mouth that no one could reach, though Peter takes it with him at the end of the novel. It is hinted that she knew Peter Pan before her children were born. Mr. Darling was named after the eldest Llewelyn Davies boy, George, and Mrs. Darling was named after Mary Ansell, Barrie's wife, although their personalities were based on Arthur and Sylvia Llewelyn Davies. In the stage version, the roles of Mr. Darling and Captain Hook are traditionally played by the same actor.
- Nana is a Newfoundland dog who is employed as a nanny by the Darling family. Nana does not speak or do anything beyond the physical capabilities of a large dog, but acts with apparent understanding of her responsibilities. The character is played in stage productions by an actor in a dog costume. Barrie based the character of Nana on his dog Luath, a Newfoundland.
- Liza is the maidservant of the Darling family. She appears only in the first act, except in the 1954 musical in which she sees the Darling children fly off with Peter; when she tries stopping them, Michael sprinkles her with fairy dust and she ends up in Neverland. She returns with the children at the end. She is given two musical numbers in this adaptation.

=== Lost Boys ===
The Lost Boys are a group of boys "who fall out of their prams when the nurse is looking the other way and if they are not claimed in seven days, they are sent far away to the Neverland". Peter Pan is their captain. There are no "lost girls" because, as Peter explains, girls are far too clever to fall out of their prams. In the novel (but not the original play), it is stated that Peter "thins them out" when they start to grow up. This is never fully explained, but it is implied that he either kills or banishes them. At the end of the story, the Darlings adopt them and they gradually lose their ability to fly and their memories of Peter and the Neverland.

- Tootles – Tootles is the humblest Lost Boy because he often misses out on their violent adventures. Although he is often stupid, he is always the first to defend Wendy. Ironically, he shoots her before meeting her for the first time because of Tinker Bell's trickery. He grows up to become a judge.
- Nibs – Nibs is described as "gay and debonair", probably the bravest Lost Boy. He says the only thing he remembers about his mother is she always wanted a cheque-book; he says he "would love to give her one... if [he] knew what a cheque-book was". He's also the oldest and best-looking Lost Boy.
- Slightly – Slightly is the most conceited because he believes he remembers the days before he was "lost". He is the only Lost Boy who "knows" his last name – he says his pinafore had the words "Slightly Soiled" written on the tag. He cuts whistles from the branches of trees, and dances to tunes he creates himself. Slightly is, apparently, a poor make-believer. He blows big breaths when he feels he is in trouble, and he eventually leads to Peter's almost-downfall. He grows up to marry a lady of title and becomes a lord.
- Curly – Curly is the most troublesome Lost Boy. In Disney's version of the story, he became "Cubby".
- The Twins – First and Second Twin know little about themselves – they are not allowed to, because Peter Pan does not know what twins are; he thinks that twins are two parts of the same person, which, while not correct, is right in the sense that the twins finish each other's sentences (at least, in the movie adaptation).

=== Inhabitants of Neverland ===
- Tiger Lily is the proud, beautiful Native American princess of the Piccaninny tribe, who are portrayed in a way now regarded as stereotypical. Barrie portrayed them as primitive, warlike savages who spoke with guttural voice tones. She is apparently old enough to be married, but refuses any suitors because she has feelings towards Peter. She is jealous of Wendy and Tinker Bell. Tiger Lily is nearly killed by Captain Hook when she is seen boarding the Jolly Roger with a knife in her mouth, but Peter saves her.
- Tinker Bell is Peter Pan's fairy. She is described as a common fairy who mends pots and kettles and, though she is sometimes ill-behaved and vindictive, at other times she is helpful and kind to Peter (for whom she has romantic feelings). The extremes in her personality are explained by the fact that a fairy's size prevents her from holding more than one feeling at a time. In Barrie's book, by Peter's first annual return for Wendy, the boy has forgotten about Tinker Bell and suggests that she "is no more" for fairies do not live long.
- Captain James Hook, the main antagonist; a vengeful pirate who lives to kill Peter Pan, not so much because Peter cut off his right hand, but because the boy is "cocky" and drives the genteel pirate to "madness". He is captain of the ship Jolly Roger. He attended Eton College before becoming a pirate and is obsessed with "good form". His real name isn't James Hook, but it is stated that revealing it would crumble the nation even now. Hook meets his demise when a crocodile eats him. On the stage, the actor who plays Mr. Darling traditionally also plays Hook.
- Mr. Smee is an Irish nonconformist pirate. He is the boatswain of the Jolly Roger. Smee is one of only two pirates to survive Peter Pan's massacre. He then makes his living saying he was the only man James Hook ever feared.
- Gentleman Starkey was once an usher at a public school. He is Captain Hook's first mate. Starkey is one of two pirates who escaped Peter Pan's massacre – he swims ashore and becomes baby-sitter to the Piccaninny Tribe. Peter Pan gives Starkey's hat to the Never Bird to use as a nest.
- Fairies – In the novel Peter and Wendy, published in 1911, there are other fairies in Neverland besides Tinker Bell. In the part of the story where Peter Pan and the Lost Boys built a house for Wendy on Neverland, Peter Pan stays up late that night to guard her from the pirates, but then the story says: "After a time he fell asleep, and some unsteady fairies had to climb over him on their way home from an orgy. Any of the other boys obstructing the fairy path at night they would have mischiefed, but they just tweaked Peter's nose and passed on." In the early 20th century, the word "orgy" generally referred to a large group of people consuming alcohol. Fairies are born when a baby laughs for the first time and live in nests on top of trees. Wendy claims the mauve fairies are boys, the white fairies are girls and the blue fairies are "not sure what they are".
- Mermaids who live in the waters near Neverland reside within the Mermaids' Lagoon. They are described as being very beautiful and mysterious creatures but equally just as vain and malevolent. Barrie states in the novel Peter and Wendy that the mermaids are only friendly to Peter, and that they will intentionally splash or even attempt to drown anyone else if they come close enough. It is especially dangerous for mortals to go to Mermaids' Lagoon at night, because that's when the mermaids sing hauntingly in the moonlight and utter strange wailing cries to attract potential victims.
- The Crocodile is Captain Hook's nemesis. During a sword fight, Peter cut off Hook's right hand and fed it to a crocodile which followed Hook ever since, hungering for more. The crocodile also swallowed a clock, whose ticking warns Hook of its presence, though it eventually runs down. At the end of the story, Captain Hook falls into the crocodile's mouth and is swallowed whole.

== Major themes ==
The play's subtitle "The Boy Who Wouldn't Grow Up" underscores the primary theme: the conflict between the innocence of childhood and the social responsibility of adulthood. Peter has chosen not to make the transition from one to the other, and encourages the other children to do the same. However, the opening line of the novel, "All children, except one, grow up", and the conclusion of the story indicates that this wish is unrealistic, and there is an element of tragedy in the alternative.

Barrie was very perspicacious in noticing many aspects of children's mental development decades before they were studied by cognitive psychologists. In particular, Peter lacks the mental capacity for secondary mental representation and cannot recollect the past, anticipate the future, consider two things at once or see things from another person's point of view. He is therefore amnesic, inconsequential, impulsive and callous.

There is a slight romantic aspect to the story, which is sometimes played down or omitted completely. Wendy's flirtatious desire to kiss Peter, his desire for a mother figure, his conflicting feelings for Wendy, Tiger Lily, and Tinker Bell (each representing different female archetypes), and the symbolism of his fight with Captain Hook (traditionally played by the same actor as Wendy's father), all could possibly hint at a Freudian interpretation (see Oedipus complex). Most children's adaptations of the play, including the 1953 Disney film, omit any romantic themes between Wendy and Peter, but Barrie's 1904 original, his 1911 novelisation, the 1954 Mary Martin musical, and the 1924 and 2003 feature films all hint at the romantic elements.

Jeffrey Howard has noted its existential motifs, claiming that Peter Pan is a "precautionary tale for those who fear the responsibilities of living, and the uncertainties of dying," which explores concepts like the inevitability of death, freedom to create our lives, alienation, and the notion that existence lacks any obvious or inherent meaning.

== Stage productions ==
The original stage production took place at the Duke of York's Theatre in London's West End on 27 December 1904. It starred Gerald du Maurier as Captain Hook and Mr. Darling, and Nina Boucicault as Peter. Members of Peter's Band were Joan Burnett (Tootles), Christine Silver (Nibs), A.W. Baskcomb (Slightly), Alice DuBarry (Curly), Pauline Chase (1st twin), Phyllis Beadon (2nd twin). Besides du Maurier, the pirates were: George Shelton (Smee), Sidney Harcourt (Gentleman Starkey), Charles Trevor (Cookson), Frederick Annerley (Cecco), Hubert Willis (Mullins), James English (Jukes), John Kelt (Noodler). Philip Darwin played Great Big Little Panther, Miriam Nesbitt was Tiger Lily, and Ela Q. May played Liza, (credited ironically as "Author of the Play"). First Pirate was played by Gerald Malvern, Second Pirate by J. Grahame, Black Pirate by S. Spencer, Crocodile by A. Ganker & C. Lawton, and the Ostrich by G. Henson.

Primarily because regulations at the time would not allow children to be on stage, a young boy could not play the role of Peter Pan, and an adult male actor would not have been suited for the role. The play then followed the pantomime tradition of casting a young woman in the role of the principal boy, although the original Peter Pan play was never classified as a pantomime.

Stepping into the role created by Nina Boucicault, Cecilia Loftus played Peter in the 1905–1906 production. Pauline Chase took the role from the 1906–07 London season until 1914 while Zena Dare was Peter on tour during most of that period. Jean Forbes-Robertson became a well-known Pan in London in the 1920s and 1930s.

Tinker Bell was represented on stage by a darting light "created by a small mirror held in the hand off-stage and reflecting a little circle of light from a powerful lamp" and her voice was "a collar of bells and two special ones that Barrie brought from Switzerland". However, a Miss "Jane Wren" or "Jenny Wren" was listed among the cast on the programmes of the original productions as playing Tinker Bell: this was meant as a joke that fooled H.M. Inspector of Taxes, who sent her a tax demand.

It is traditional in productions of Peter Pan for Mr. Darling (the children's father) and Captain Hook to be played (or voiced) by the same actor. Although this was originally done simply to make full use of the actor (the characters appear in different sections of the story) with no thematic intent, some critics have perceived a similarity between the two characters as central figures in the lives of the children. It also brings a poignant juxtaposition between Mr. Darling's harmless bluster and Captain Hook's pompous vanity.

Following the success of his original London production, Charles Frohman mounted a production in New York City at the Empire Theatre in 1905. The 1905 Broadway production starred Maude Adams, who would play the role on and off again for more than a decade and, in the U.S., was the model for the character for more than 100 years afterwards. It was produced again in the U.S. by the Civic Repertory Theater in November 1928 and December 1928, in which Eva Le Gallienne directed and played the role of Peter Pan. Her production was the first where Peter flew out over the heads of the audience. Among musical theatre adaptations, the most famous in the U.S. has been the 1954 American musical version directed by Jerome Robbins and starring Mary Martin, which was later videotaped for television and rebroadcast several times. Martin became the actress most associated with the role in the U.S. for several decades, although Sandy Duncan and Cathy Rigby each later toured extensively in this version and became well known in the role.

== Adaptations ==
The story of Peter Pan has been a popular one for adaptation into other media. The story and its characters have been used as the basis for a number of motion pictures (live action and animated), stage musicals, television programs, a ballet, and ancillary media and merchandise. The best known of these are the 1953 animated feature film produced by Walt Disney featuring the voice of 15-year-old film actor Bobby Driscoll (one of the first male actors in the title role, which was traditionally played by women); the series of musical productions (and their televised presentations) starring Mary Martin, Sandy Duncan, and Cathy Rigby; and the 2003 live-action feature film directed by P. J. Hogan starring Jeremy Sumpter and Jason Isaacs.

There have been several additions to Peter Pan's story, including the authorised sequel novel Peter Pan in Scarlet, and the high-profile sequel films Hook and Return to Never Land. Various characters from the story have appeared in other places, especially Tinker Bell as a mascot and character of Disney. The characters are in the public domain in some jurisdictions, leading to unauthorised extensions to the mythos and uses of the characters. Some of these have been controversial, such as a series of prequels by Dave Barry and Ridley Pearson, and Lost Girls, a sexually explicit graphic novel by Alan Moore and Melinda Gebbie, featuring Wendy Darling and the heroines of The Wonderful Wizard of Oz and Alice's Adventures in Wonderland.

== Criticism and controversy ==
Critics have argued that the novel has racist undertones specifically in the case of the "redskins" tribe (the "Piccaninny tribe"), who refer to Peter as "the Great White Father" and speak in pidgin English. Later screen adaptations have taken different approaches to these characters, variously presenting them as racial caricatures, omitting them, attempting to present them more authentically, or reframing them as another kind of "exotic" people.

== Copyright status ==
The copyright status of the story of Peter Pan and its characters has been the subject of dispute, particularly as the original version began to enter the public domain in various jurisdictions. In 1929, Barrie gave the copyright to the works featuring Peter Pan to Great Ormond Street Hospital (GOSH), Britain's leading children's hospital, and requested that the value of the gift should never be disclosed; this gift was confirmed in his will. GOSH has exercised these rights internationally to help support the work of the institution.

=== United Kingdom ===
The UK copyright in the 1904 play and the 1911 book originally expired at the end of 1987 (50 years after Barrie's death) but was revived in 1995 following the directive to harmonise copyright laws within the EU which extended the term to the end of 2007.

However, in spite of the fact that the play's copyright has expired, the Copyright, Designs and Patents Act 1988 includes a statutory provision granting royalties in perpetuity to Great Ormond Street Hospital. Specifically, the act provides that the hospital trustees are entitled to a royalty "in respect of any public performance, commercial publication or communication to the public of the whole or any substantial part of [the play] or an adaptation of it." The act provides a right to receive royalties only, and does not extend to other typical intellectual property rights such as creative control over the use of the material or the right to refuse permission to use it. The legislation does not apply to earlier works which feature the character Peter Pan such as The Little White Bird or Peter Pan in Kensington Gardens. It is the only perpetual right in relation to a work in the United Kingdom other than the King James Bible.

=== United States ===
Great Ormond Street Hospital (GOSH) claims that U.S. legislation effective in 1978 and again in 1998, which extended the copyright of the play script published in 1928, gave them copyright over "Peter Pan" in general until the end of 2023, although GOSH acknowledges that the copyright of the novel version, published in 1911, had expired in the United States. The original play Peter Pan; or, The Boy Who Wouldn't Grow Up entered the public domain in the United States in 2024.

Previously, GOSH's claim of U.S. copyright had been contested by various parties. J. E. Somma sued GOSH to permit the U.S. publication of her sequel After the Rain, A New Adventure for Peter Pan. GOSH and Somma settled out of court in March 2004, issuing a joint statement in which GOSH stated the work is a valuable contribution to the field of children's literature. Somma characterised her novel – which she had argued was a critique of the original work, rather than a derivative of it – as fair use of the hospital's U.S. copyright. However, the suit was settled under terms of absolute secrecy, and did not set any legal precedent.

Disney was a long-time licensee to the animation rights, and cooperated with the hospital when its copyright claim was clear, but in 2004 Disney published Dave Barry's and Ridley Pearson's Peter and the Starcatchers in the U.S., the first of several sequels, without permission and without making royalty payments. In 2006, Top Shelf Productions published Lost Girls, a sexually explicit graphic novel featuring Wendy Darling, in the U.S., also without permission or royalties.

=== Other jurisdictions ===
The original versions of the play and novel are in the public domain in most of the world—see the Wikipedia list of countries' copyright length the term of copyright is 88 years (or less) after the death of the creators.

== See also ==
- List of works based on Peter Pan
- Peter Pan's Flight
- Puer aeternus
