= Du Maurier =

du Maurier may refer to:

- The du Maurier family:
  - George du Maurier (1834–1896), British author and cartoonist
  - Guy du Maurier (1865–1915), English army officer and playwright, son of George
  - Sir Gerald du Maurier (1873–1934), British actor, son of George and brother of Guy
  - Angela du Maurier (1904–2002), British author and eldest daughter of Sir Gerald
  - Dame Daphne du Maurier (1907–1989), British author and middle daughter of Sir Gerald
  - Jeanne du Maurier (1911–1997), English artist and youngest daughter of Sir Gerald
- Bedelia Du Maurier, original fictional character in NBC's Hannibal, played by Gillian Anderson
- The du Mauriers, historical novel by Daphne du Maurier based on her family's history
- du Maurier (cigarette), a brand of Canadian cigarettes
- du Maurier Classic, former name of the Canadian Women's Open golf tournament
- du Maurier Jazz Festival, former name of the Toronto Jazz Festival
- du Maurier Stadium, former name of Uniprix Stadium, a Montreal tennis stadium
- du Maurier Open, former name of the Canada Masters tennis tournament
