= DiMauro =

DiMauro, or Di Mauro, is an Italian surname. Notable people with the surname include:

== DiMauro ==
- Catherine DiMauro (c. 1957–1988), American murder victim
- Daniel DiMauro (fl. from 2011), American documentary filmmaker
- Elliot DiMauro, fictional character on the television series Just Shoot Me!
- Salvatore DiMauro (Born 1939), Italian neurologist
- Stephen A. DiMauro (1932–2020), American horse trainer
- Stephen L. DiMauro (born 1957), American Thoroughbred racehorse trainer
- Vanessa DiMauro (born 1967), American researcher

== Di Mauro ==
- Alessio di Mauro (born 1977), Italian former tennis player
- André Di Mauro (born 1964), Brazilian actor, director, producer, writer, and screenwriter
- Beatrice Weder di Mauro (born 1965), Swiss economist
- Fabrizio Di Mauro (born 1965), Italian former footballer
- Gaetano Di Mauro (born 1997), Brazilian racing driver
- Gennaro Di Mauro (born 2001), Italian rower
- Roberto Di Mauro (born 1956), Italian politician
- Stefano Di Mauro (fl. early 21st century), Italian American Rabbi
- Vincenzo Di Mauro (born 1951), Italian bishop

== See also ==
- Du Maurier
