= Jeanne du Maurier =

English artist (1911–1997)

- Jeanne du Maurier in 1922
- Born: Jeanne Busson du Maurier; 27 March 1911; London, England, UK
- Died: 12 January 1997 (aged 85); Dartmoor, Devon, England, UK
- Occupation: Painter
- Partners: Noël Welch
- Parent(s): Sir Gerald du Maurier (father); Muriel Beaumont (mother)
- Relatives: Angela du Maurier (sister); Daphne du Maurier (sister); George du Maurier (grandfather); Comyns Beaumont (great uncle); Guy du Maurier (uncle); Sylvia Llewelyn Davies (aunt)

Jeanne du Maurier (27 March 1911 – 12 January 1997) was an English artist. She was the third daughter of Sir Gerald du Maurier and Muriel Beaumont, and sister of writers Daphne and Angela du Maurier.

== Life ==
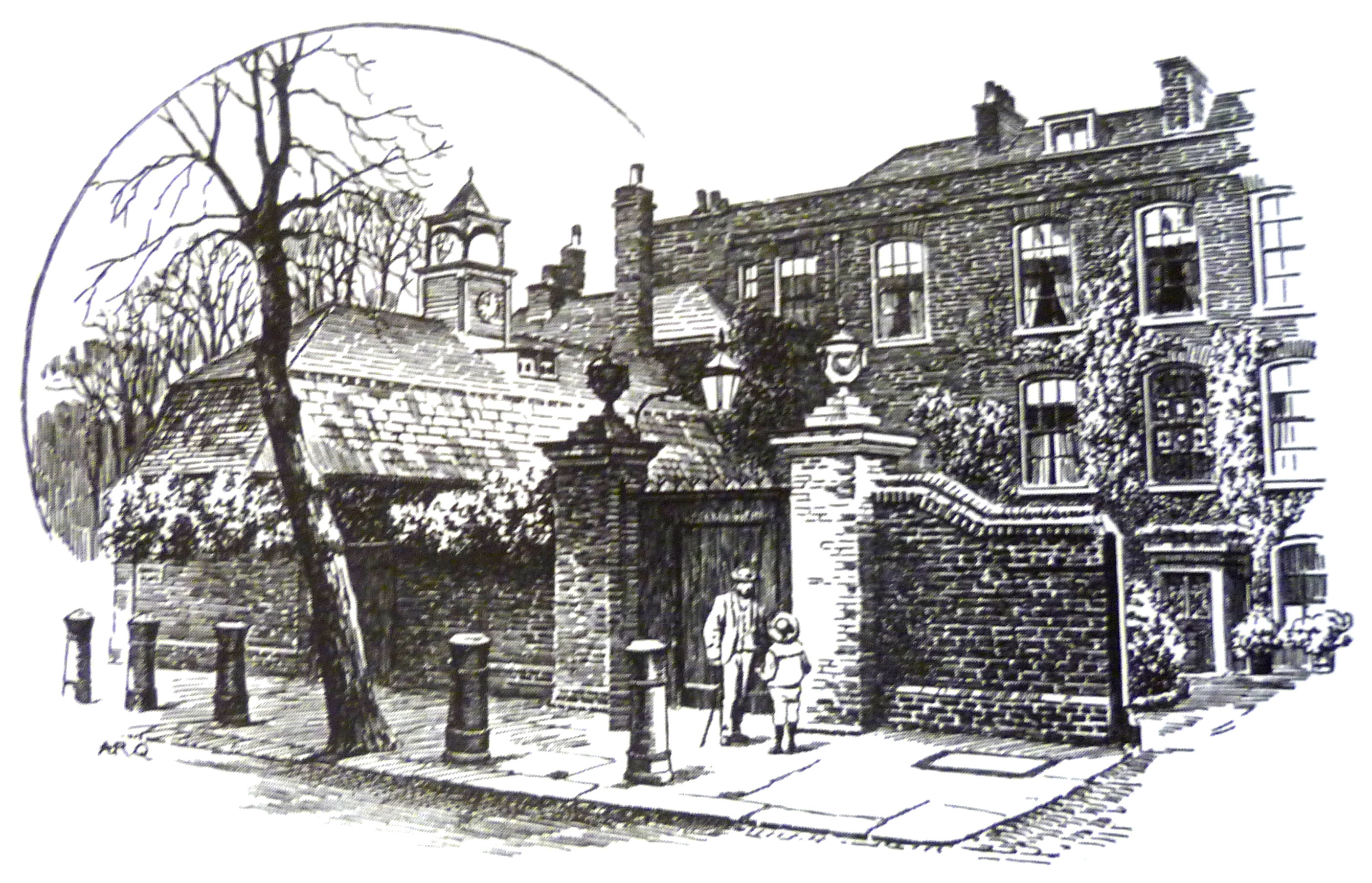
Cannon Hall, Hampstead, drawn by A.R. Quinton, 1911, the family home in London from 1916 to 1934.

Jeanne du Maurier was born on 27 March 1911 in London, the youngest of the three daughters of actor-manager Sir Gerald du Maurier and actress Muriel Beaumont, she was born in London. Her paternal grandfather was the author and Punch cartoonist George du Maurier, who created the character of Svengali in the novel Trilby. Her paternal uncle Guy du Maurier was a playwright. Her mother was a paternal niece of journalist, author, lecturer, and editor Comyns Beaumont. Her elder sister, Angela du Maurier, became an actress and later also a writer, and her middle sister, Daphne was a popular writer. She was also a cousin of the Llewelyn Davies boys, who served as J. M. Barrie's inspiration for the characters in the play Peter Pan, or The Boy Who Wouldn't Grow Up.

From an early age, she showed talent in drawing and painting and at the age of sixteen, she attended the Central School of Arts and Crafts (now Central School of Art and Design) in Southampton Row, London, where she was taught by Bernard Meninsky. She later studied at St John's Wood Art School under P.F. Millard's tuition.

After her father's death in 1934, du Maurier, together with her mother and her elder sister Angela, moved from Cannon Hall, the family home in Hampstead, to a smaller house nearby. The three of them also spent a lot of time at Ferryside, their home in Bodinnick, Cornwall, where they lived permanently after 1939. During the World War II, she ran a market garden.

In 1945, during a visit to St Ives, she discovered its painters' colony, which revived her calling as an artist. In 1946, she left Ferryside for a studio in St Ives and held her first exhibition at the town's Society of Artists' autumn show. At that time, she met the artist Dod Procter and they began a close relationship.

In 1949, du Maurier and Dod Procter were invited to join the Penwith Society of Arts which was started by Barbara Hepworth and Ben Nicholson, who wanted to break away from the traditionalist St Ives Society of Arts. It was also when she met the poet Noël Welch, who would become her life-long companion and partner. In 1953, Welch and du Maurier moved together to Manaton, a village in Dartmoor, Devon where they remained for the rest of their lives.

Du Maurier painted mostly still lifes, flowers, landscapes, and some portraits. She continued to paint all her life and exhibited her work in galleries in London and in Cornwall, with the St Ives Society of Arts as well as the Newlyn Artists.

Du Maurier died at her home in Dartmoor on 12 January 1997, aged 85.
