= An Englishman's Home =

An Englishman's Home may refer to:

- An Englishman's Home (play), a 1909 play by Guy du Maurier
- An Englishman's Home (film), a 1940 British drama film based on the play

== See also ==
- An Englishman's home is his castle
