= Angela du Maurier =

British actress and novelist (1904–2002)

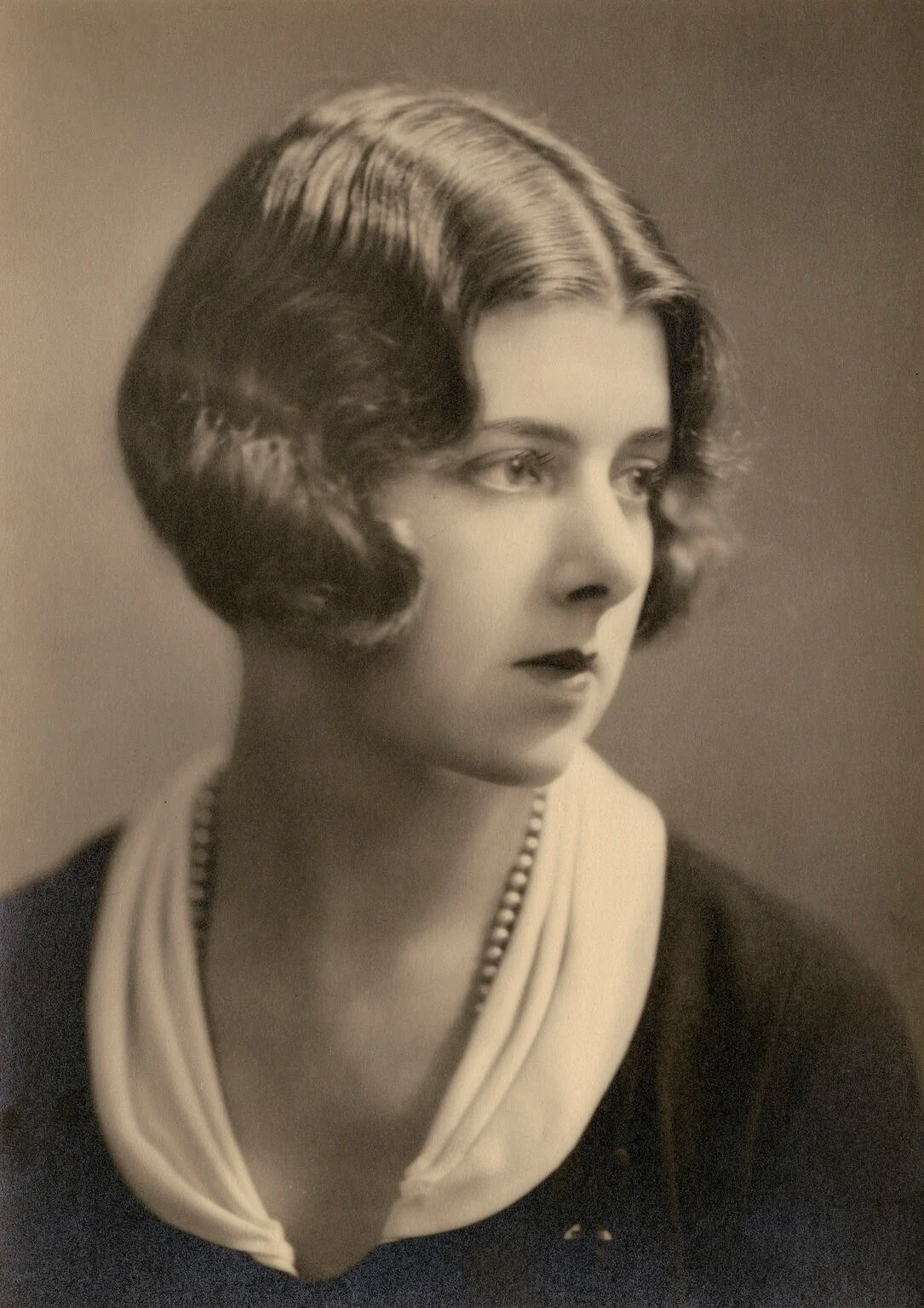
- Portrait of Angela du Maurier by Hay Wrightson, 1920s
- Born: Angela Busson du Maurier; 1 March 1904; London, England, UK
- Died: 5 February 2002 (aged 97); London, England, UK
- Occupations: Actress, writer
- Parent(s): Sir Gerald du Maurier (father); Muriel Beaumont (mother)
- Relatives: Daphne du Maurier (sister); Jeanne du Maurier (sister); George du Maurier (grandfather); Comyns Beaumont (great uncle); Guy du Maurier (uncle); Sylvia Llewelyn Davies (aunt)
- Writing career
- Period: 1939–1969
- Notable work: Treveryan

Angela Busson du Maurier (1 March 1904 – 5 February 2002) was an English actress and novelist who also wrote two volumes of autobiography, It's Only the Sister (1951) and Old Maids Remember (1965). Her sister was the novelist Daphne du Maurier, and her grandfather was George du Maurier, a writer and cartoonist.

== Life ==
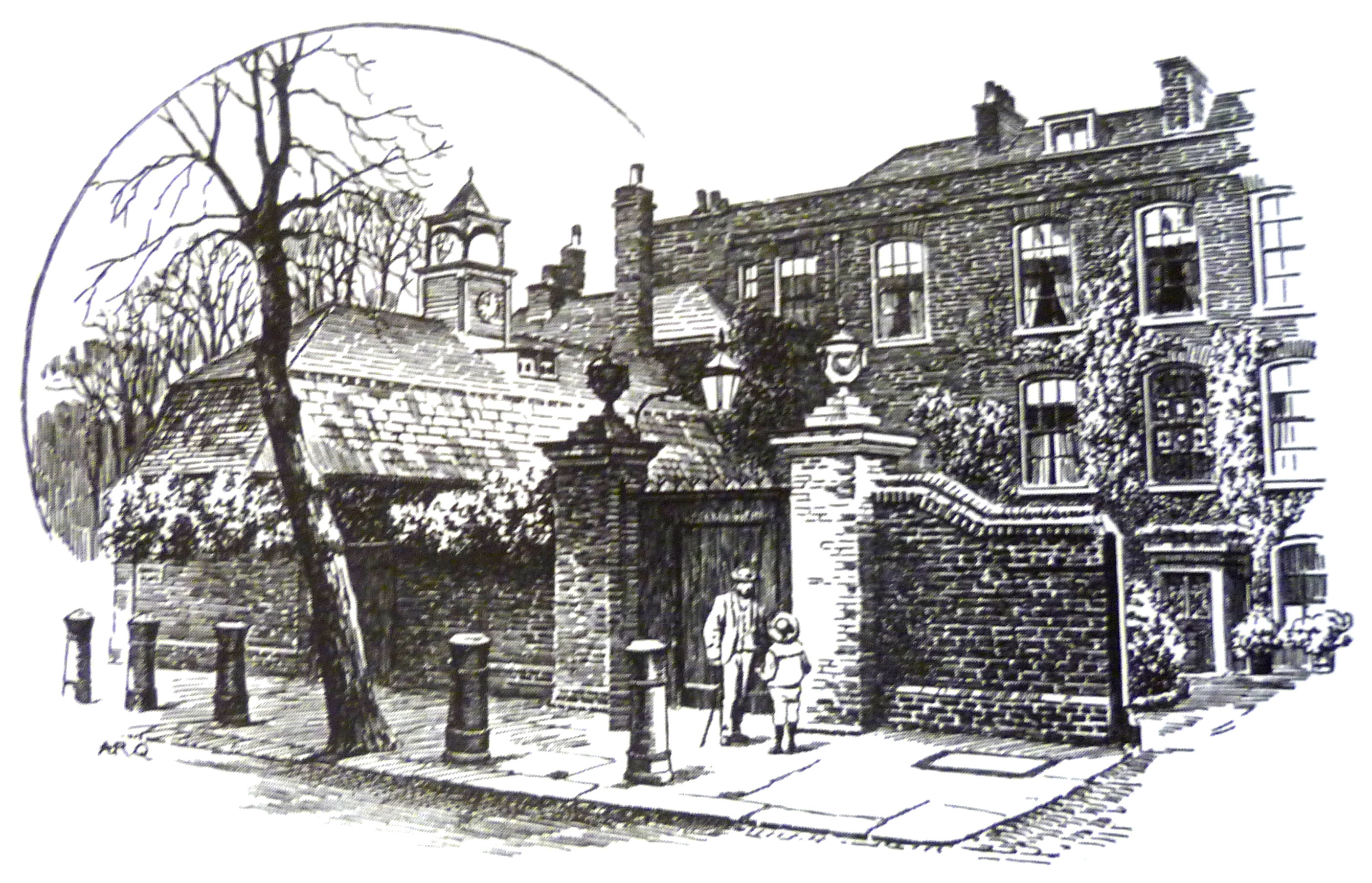
Cannon Hall, Hampstead, drawn by A.R. Quinton, 1911, the family home in London from 1916 to 1934.

Angela du Maurier was born on 1 March 1904 in St Pancras, London, the eldest of three daughters of the actor-manager Sir Gerald du Maurier and his wife, actress Muriel Beaumont. Her paternal grandfather was the author and Punch cartoonist George du Maurier, who created the character of Svengali in the novel Trilby. Her paternal uncle Guy du Maurier was a playwright.

Her mother was a paternal niece of journalist, author, lecturer and editor Comyns Beaumont. Her middle sister (Daphne) became a popular writer, while her younger sister (Jeanne) was a painter. She was also a cousin of the Llewelyn Davies boys, who served as J. M. Barrie's inspiration for the characters in the play Peter Pan, or The Boy Who Wouldn't Grow Up.

As a young child, du Maurier met many prominent theatre actors, thanks to the celebrity of her father. Originally aspiring to follow the family tradition of acting, she planned to be an actress and spent two seasons on the stage. She played Wendy Darling alongside both Gladys Cooper and Dorothy Dickson as Peter Pan.

After her father's death in 1934, du Maurier, together with her mother and her younger sister Jeanne, moved from Cannon Hall, the family home in Hampstead, to a smaller house nearby. The three of them also spent a lot of time at Ferryside, their home in Bodinnick, Cornwall, where they lived permanently after 1939. She worked on the land in Cornwall during the World War II, and travelled extensively in Europe.

She later turned to writing, with the release of her earlier works coinciding with the publication of her sister's Rebecca and Frenchman's Creek. She published 12 novels and 2 autobiographies.

She died at age 97 on 5 February 2002 in Wandsworth. Although she was the eldest of the sisters, she outlived her middle sister Daphne by thirteen years, and her youngest sister Jeanne by five years.

== Bibliography ==
- 1939 The Perplexed Heart
- 1940 The Spinning Wheel
- 1941 The Little Less
- 1942 Treveryan
- 1946 Lawrence Vane
- 1948 Birkinshaw and other stories
- 1950 Reveille
- 1951 It's Only the Sister: an autobiography
- 1952 Shallow Waters
- 1963 The Road to Leenane
- 1965 Old Maids Remember: autobiography
- 1967 Pilgrims by the Way
- 1967 S is for Sin
- 1969 The Frailty of Nature
