= Muriel Beaumont =

English stage actress (1876–1957)

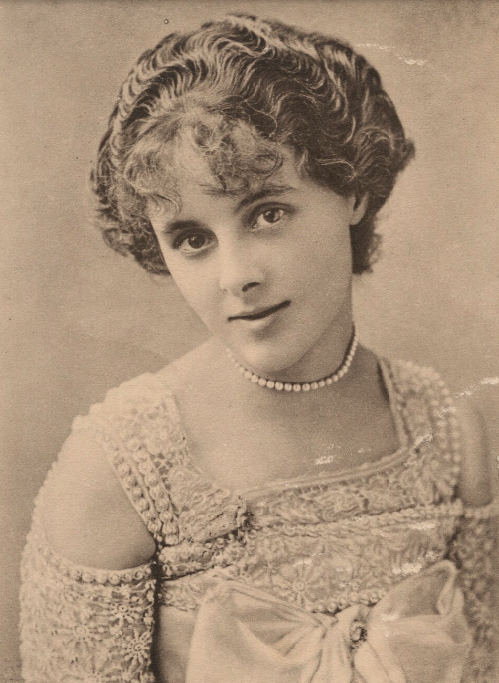
- Beaumont in 1900
- Born: Muriel Beaumont; 14 April 1876; Sutton, Surrey, England, UK
- Died: 27 November 1957 (aged 81); Liskeard, Cornwall, England, UK
- Occupation: Actress
- Years active: 1898–1910
- Spouse: Gerald du Maurier (m. 1903; died 1934)
- Children: Angela du Maurier; Daphne du Maurier; Jeanne du Maurier
- Relatives: Comyns Beaumont (uncle); Diana Beaumont (sister); Gabrielle Beaumont (niece)

Muriel Beaumont, Lady du Maurier (14 April 1876 – 27 November 1957) was an English stage actress from 1898 until retiring in 1910. She was the wife of the actor and manager, Sir Gerald du Maurier, and mother of the writers Angela du Maurier and Daphne du Maurier, and artist Jeanne du Maurier.

== Biography ==
Muriel Beaumont was born on 14 April 1876 in Sutton, Surrey, daughter of Henry "Harry" Beaumont, a solicitor, and wife Emily, née Bidwell. She was the paternal niece of the writer and editor Comyns Beaumont (1873-1955).

Despite her father's disapproval, she became an actress. Her first appearance was at the Haymarket Theatre in 1898.

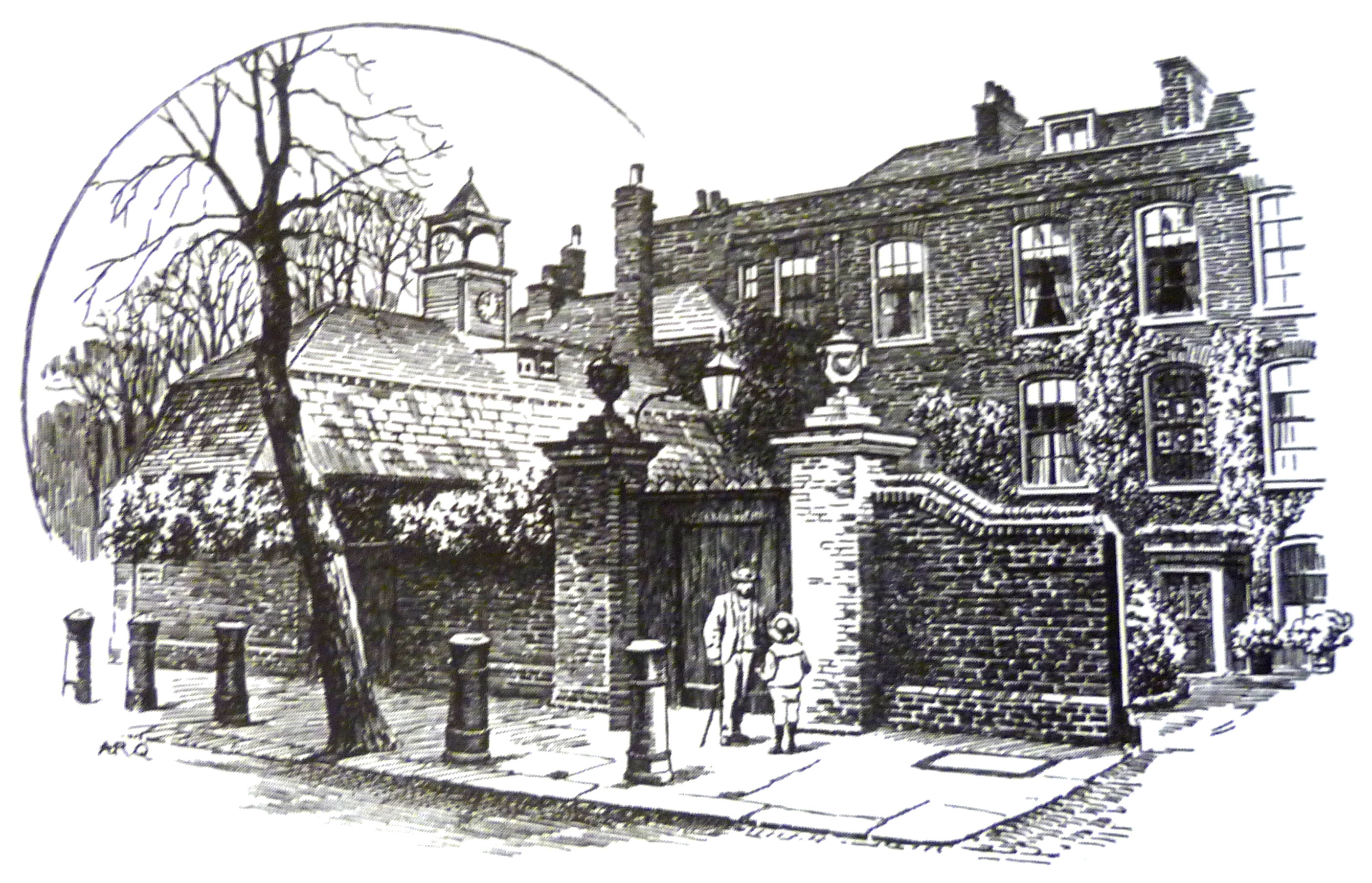
Cannon Hall, Hampstead, drawn by A.R. Quinton, 1911, where the du Maurier family lived from 1916 to 1934

In 1902, she was cast as Lady Agatha in The Admirable Crichton. Also in the cast was Gerald du Maurier. They were married five months later on 11 April 1903 at St Peter, Cranley Gardens, Kensington. Her husband was the son of the author and Punch cartoonist George du Maurier, who created the character of Svengali in the 1894 novel Trilby. Muriel and Gerald du Maurier had three children: the actress and writer Angela du Maurier (1904–2002), the writer Daphne du Maurier (1907–1989) and the painter Jeanne du Maurier (1911–1997).

After marriage, Beaumont maintained her stage career until 1910, but she and her husband never appeared on stage together after The Admirable Crichton. In 1905, she played Nerissa to Violet Vanbrugh's Portia in The Merchant of Venice. She also appeared in English translations of light French comedies. In 1908, she appeared with Weedon Grossmith and A.E. Matthews in Frederick Lonsdale's farce The Early Worm.

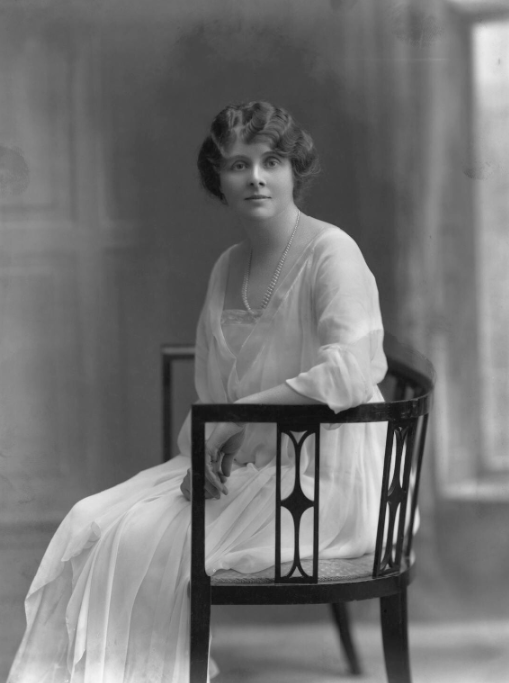
Muriel Beaumont in March 1916

On 1932, her middle daughter Daphne married Frederick Browning. After her husband's death on 11 April 1934, Beaumont, together with her elder daughter, Angela, and her younger daughter, Jeanne, moved from Cannon Hall, the family home in Hampstead, to a smaller house nearby. The three of them also spent a lot of time at Ferryside, their home in Bodinnick, Cornwall, where they lived permanently after 1939. During the World War II, her daughters worked the land and ran a market garden. In 1946, her daughter, Jeanne, left the family home to live away.

She died at 81, on 27 November 1957, in her home in Liskeard, Cornwall.
