= An Englishman's Home (play) =

1909 play by Guy du Maurier

An Englishman's Home is a threat-of-invasion play by Guy du Maurier, first produced in 1909. The title is a reference to the expression "an Englishman's home is his castle".

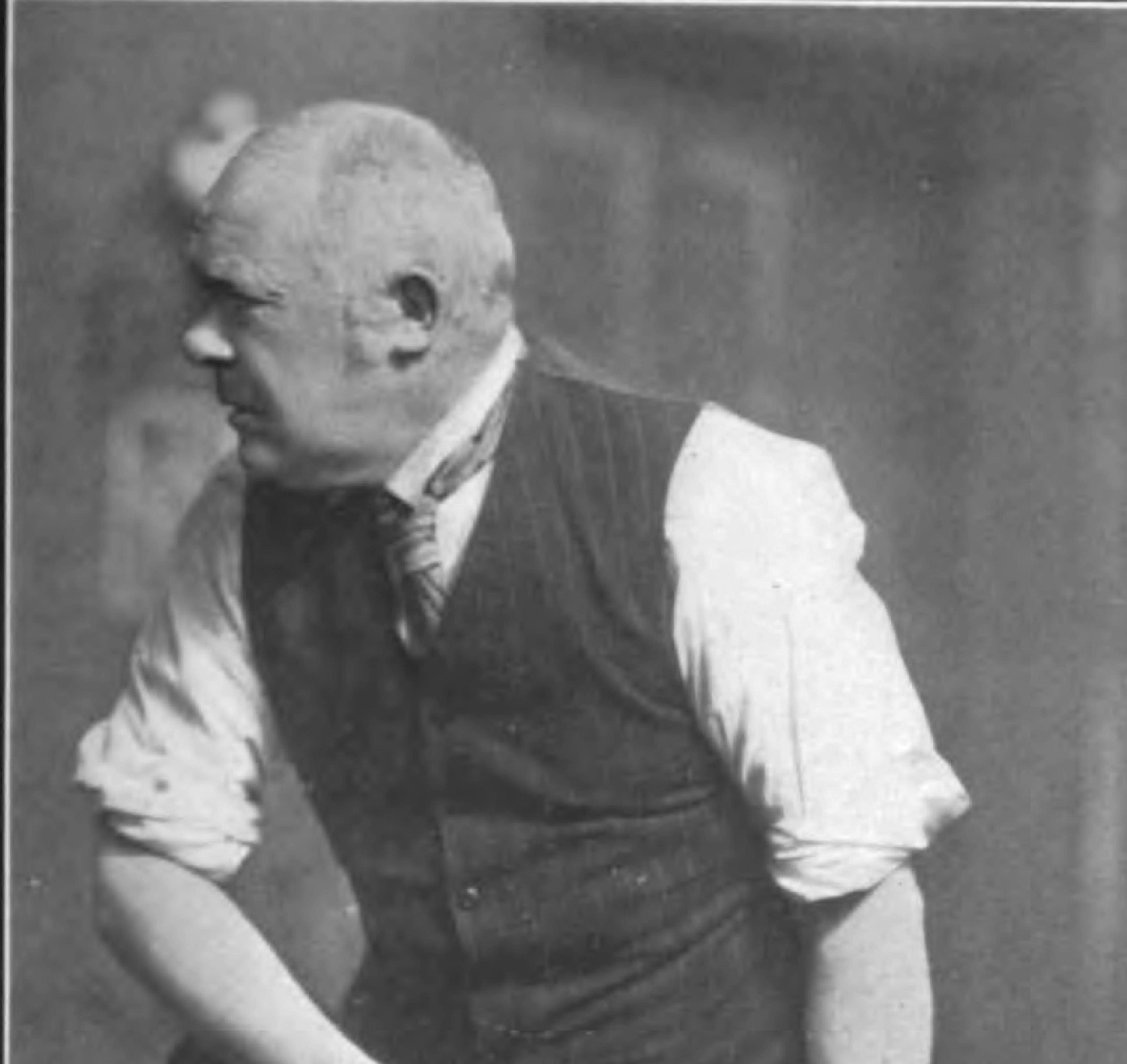
Actor William Hawtrey in An Englishman's Home on Broadway (ca. 1909)

== Play ==
An Englishman's Home caused a sensation in London when it appeared anonymously, under the name "A Patriot", in 1909. The writer Guy du Maurier was a regular officer in the British Army, who had seen active service during the South African War and who was to be killed in France in 1915.

It first played at Wyndham's Theatre on 27 January and went on to be a long-running success. It is now considered a typical example of the invasion literature popular at the time. The play was produced by Guy's brother Gerald du Maurier, possibly without his knowledge and with some assistance from J. M. Barrie. The story concerns an attack on England by a foreign power identified as "Nearland", generally assumed to represent Germany. The home of an ordinary middle-class family is besieged by Nearlander soldiers, and the play climaxes with the father shooting an enemy officer and subsequently being executed. In Guy du Maurier's original version the invaders triumph but J. M. Barrie and Gerald du Maurier revised the ending to provide a last-minute British victory.

The play stressed Britain's unpreparedness for attack, and has been credited with boosting recruitment to the Territorial Force in the years immediately before World War I. The play was revived on stage in May 1939 at London's Prince's Theatre. It influenced niece Daphne du Maurier's 1952 novelette The Birds, which was made into a movie directed by Alfred Hitchcock.

== Film ==
=== 1914 film ===
In 1914, the play was made into a silent film directed by Ernest Batley.

=== 1940 film ===
An Englishman's Home
- Starring: Edmund Gwenn
- Release date: 1940
- Country: United Kingdom
- Language: English
- Budget: £100,000

Du Maurier's play was also the basis for the 1940 British drama film of the same name directed by Albert de Courville and starring Edmund Gwenn, Mary Maguire and Paul Henreid. A German spy is despatched to Britain to search out targets for a planned invasion. The film, which was also known as "Mad Men of Europe", was released in the UK by United Artists on 27 January 1940 and in the US by Columbia Pictures on 26 June 1940.

It was the first film with a wartime setting to be shown in London since the war began.

==== Cast ====
- Edmund Gwenn ... Tom Brown
- Mary Maguire ... Betty Brown
- Paul Henreid ... Victor Brandt
- Carl Jaffe ... Martin
- Norah Howard ... Maggie
- Geoffrey Toone ... Peter Templeton
- Richard Ainley ... Geoffrey Brown
- Desmond Tester ... Billy Brown
- Meinhart Maur ... Waldo
- Mavis Villiers ... Dolly
- Mark Lester ... Uncle Ben
- John Wood ... Jimmy
