= Bulldog Drummond (play) =

1921 work by H.C. McNeile & Gerald du Maurier

- Written by: H.C. McNeile; Gerald du Maurier
- Original language: English
- Genre: Adventure

Premiere
- Date premiered: 29 March 1921
- Place premiered: Wyndham's Theatre, London

Bulldog Drummond is a 1921 play by H.C. McNeile and Gerald du Maurier. It is based on McNeile's 1920 novel of the same title featuring the gentleman adventurer Bulldog Drummond.

Its original run at Wyndham's Theatre in London's West End lasted for 430 performances between 29 March 1921 and 1 April 1922. Du Maurier played Drummond alongside Ronald Squire as Algy Langworth, Claud Allister as Hiram G. Travers and Alfred Drayton as the villain Carl Peterson. It was revived in London on several occasions. The title role was played on Broadway by A.E. Matthews in a run lasting 162 performances.

== Bibliography ==
- Lachman, Marvin. The Villainous Stage: Crime Plays on Broadway and in the West End. McFarland, 2014.
- Wearing, J.P. The London Stage 1920-1929: A Calendar of Productions, Performers, and Personnel. Rowman & Littlefield, 2014.
