= An Englishman's Home (film) =

1940 film

- Directed by: Albert de Courville
- Written by: Rodney Ackland; Ian Hay; Edward Knoblock; Dennis Wheatley
- Based on: An Englishman's Home by Guy du Maurier
- Produced by: Neville E. Neville
- Starring: Edmund Gwenn; Mary Maguire; Paul Henreid
- Cinematography: Mutz Greenbaum; Cyril J. Knowles
- Edited by: Lister Laurance
- Music by: Louis Levy
- Production company: Aldwych Films
- Distributed by: United Artists
- Release date: 27 January 1940
- Running time: 79 minutes
- Country: United Kingdom
- Language: English

An Englishman's Home (U.S. title Mad Men of Europe; also known as Amour D'espion) is a 1940 British drama film directed by Albert de Courville and starring Edmund Gwenn, Mary Maguire and Paul Henreid. It was written by Rodney Ackland, Ian Hay, Edward Knoblock and Dennis Wheatley, adapted from the 1909 play An Englishman's Home by Guy du Maurier.

== Cast ==
- Edmund Gwenn as Tom Brown
- Mary Maguire as Betty Brown
- Paul Henreid as Victor Brandt
- Geoffrey Toone as Peter Templeton
- Richard Ainley as Geoffrey Brown
- Desmond Tester as Billy Brown
- Carl Jaffe as Martin
- Meinhart Maur as Waldo
- Mavis Villiers as Dolly
- Mark Lester as Uncle Ben
- Norah Howard as Maggie
- John Wood as Jimmy

== Production ==
It was filmed at Denham Studios outside London with production commencing in May 1939. The film's sets were designed by the art director Wilfred Arnold.

== Release ==
Originally released in the UK in January 19040, was picked up for distribution in the United States by Columbia Pictures who released it in June 1940 under the alternative title Mad Men of Europe.

== Reception ==
The Monthly Film Bulletin wrote: "The story is no more than an adventure serial for schoolboys, and even they will despise the film for its technical inadequacies and for the meagre material used, particularly in the final sequences when the same shot of aeroplanes in flight, and one with nothing intrinsic to recommend it, is used four times. The photography is uninspired, with entirely flat lighting all through, and the direction is: nothing more than straight-forward. It would, however, be impossible to enliven the story, short of resorting to burlesque."

Kine Weekly wrote: "Paul von Hernried acts with restraint as spy Brandt; he invites a little sympathy, put Mary Maguire is a colourless Betty. ... Here is a picture that is for the most part a victim of circumstances. A month or so ago its portrait of invasion, highly coloured as it s, would have served as propaganda, but there is no use for its spectacular speculations to-day. Points of Appeal. – None."

Picturegoer wrote: "There is not a great deal of realism in the aerial sequences and, indeed, the whole story strikes one as fantastic and novelettish."
