= Comyns Beaumont =

British journalist, writer and editor

- Born: William Comyns Beaumont; 17 October 1873
- Died: 30 December 1955 (aged 82)
- Occupations: journalist, writer and editor
- Relatives: Muriel Beaumont (Niece)

William Comyns Beaumont, also known as Comyns Beaumont and Appian Way (17 October 1873 – 30 December 1955), was a British author, journalist, lecturer, and editor. Beaumont was a staff writer for the Daily Mail and eventually became editor of the Bystander in 1903 and then The Graphic in 1932.

Beaumont's astronomical speculations were later mirrored by Immanuel Velikovsky's works.

== Family ==
Beaumont was the paternal uncle of the British actress Muriel Beaumont, the mother of writers Angela du Maurier and Daphne du Maurier, and the painter Jeanne du Maurier.

== Theories ==
Beaumont accepted the existence of giants based on British folklore, and argued other mythological creatures were actually real.

In Facts and Fallacies (1988) published by Reader's Digest, Beaumont's views are summarized:

In a series of books published between 1946 and 1949, British journalist William Comyns Beaumont astonished the world with the following extraordinary revelations: Jesus of Nazareth had been crucified just outside Edinburgh, Scotland — the site of the ancient city of Jerusalem. Satan was a comet that collided with the earth and caused Noah's Flood. The ancient Egyptians were in fact Irishmen. Hell is to be found in western Scotland. The Greek hero Achilles spent his childhood on the Isle of Skye. Galilee, birthplace of Jesus, was Wales. Ancient Athens was in reality Bath, England ... Comyns Beaumont started his radical revision of history with the belief, innocuous enough, that the lost island of Atlantis might be Britain.

He was also a proponent of the Shakespeare authorship question, arguing Shakespeare's plays were written by Francis Bacon.

== Works ==
- The Riddle of the Earth (written under the name of Appian Way), Chapman & Hall, London (or Brentano's, New York), 1925, OCLC 1517479
- The Mysterious Comet: Or the Origin, Building up, and Destruction of Worlds, by means of Cometary Contacts, Rider & Co., London, 1932, OCLC 8997586
- The Riddle of Prehistoric Britain, Rider & Co., London, 1946 (Kessinger Publishing Co., 1997, ISBN 1-56459-900-0)
- Britain, the Key to World History, Rider & Co., London, 1947
- The Private Life of the Virgin Queen, self-published, 1947, OCLC 601691
- A Rebel in Fleet Street, Hutchinson & Co., London, 1948 (or 1944) (his autobiography)
- The Great Deception Rediscovered by the Comyns Beaumont Archive in 2015. Previously referenced as After Atlantis: the Greatest Story Never Told (a title bestowed by Robert Stephanos) in Eccentric Lives, Peculiar Notions, John Michell, 2002, ISBN 1-57912-228-0, pp. 136–143)
