= Noah Thomas =

Welsh physician

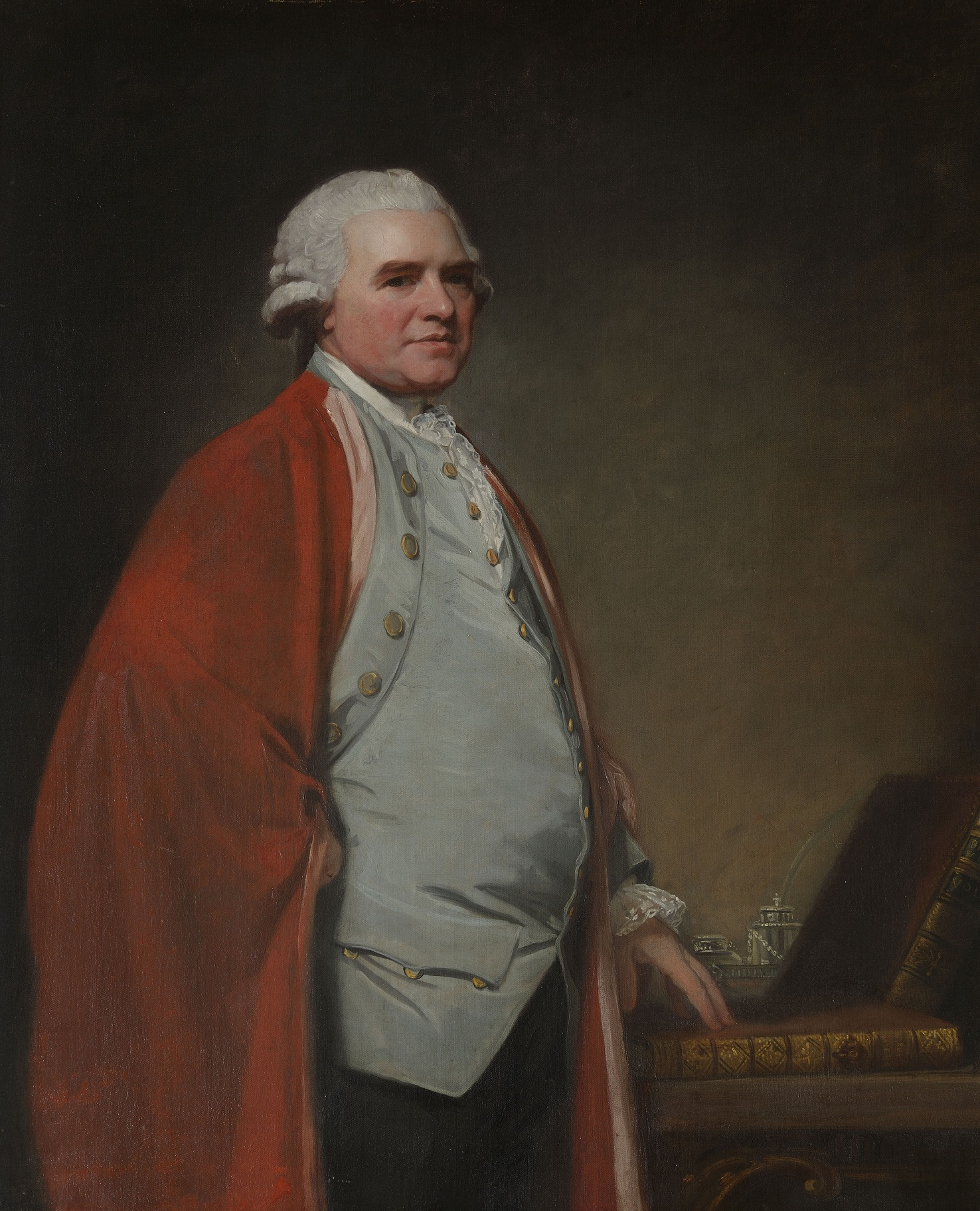
Sir Noah Thomas in painting by George Romney, 1781.

Sir Noah Thomas FRS FRCP (1720 – 17 May 1792) was a Welsh physician who was physician-in-ordinary to King George III. He was a fellow of the Royal Society and the Royal College of Physicians, and a Gulstonian lecturer.

Thomas was born in Neath, Glamorganshire, the son of Hophni Thomas, master of a merchant vessel. He was educated in Oakham, Rutland, and St John's College, Cambridge.

Thomas was the occupant, in 1780, of Cannon Hall, Hampstead.

He was knighted in 1775. He died in Bath, Somerset in 1792.
