= Cannon Hall, Hampstead =

House in Hampstead, London, England

Coordinates: 51.5601°N 0.1751°W

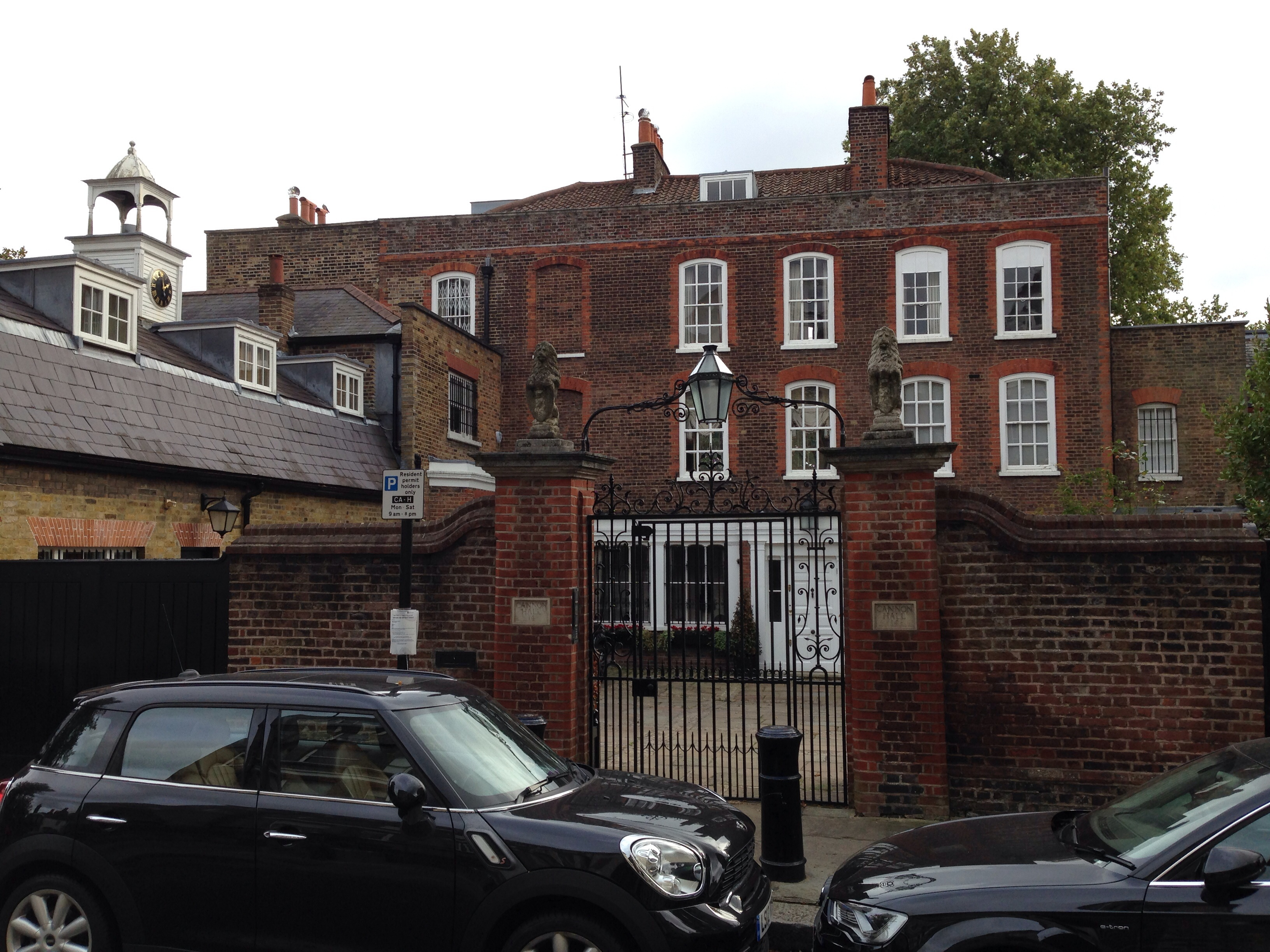
Cannon Hall in October 2016

Cannon Hall at 14 Cannon Place, Hampstead, London is a grade II* listed building that dates from around 1720. The house is the former home of the actor Gerald du Maurier, his wife Muriel Beaumont, and their three children, the writers Angela du Maurier and Daphne du Maurier and the painter Jeanne du Maurier.

== The house ==
Cannon Hall is located at 14 Cannon Place, Hampstead, London. It was built around 1720 and extended and altered in the nineteenth and twentieth centuries. The house is detached, of three storeys of brown and red brick, with six bedrooms and grounds of slightly less than half an acre (0.18ha). The total plot size is 0.45 acres (1,807 sq m). In addition to the bedrooms and living rooms, the house includes a billiards room, library, study, conservatory and indoor swimming pool. The house has been a grade II* listed building with Historic England since 1950.

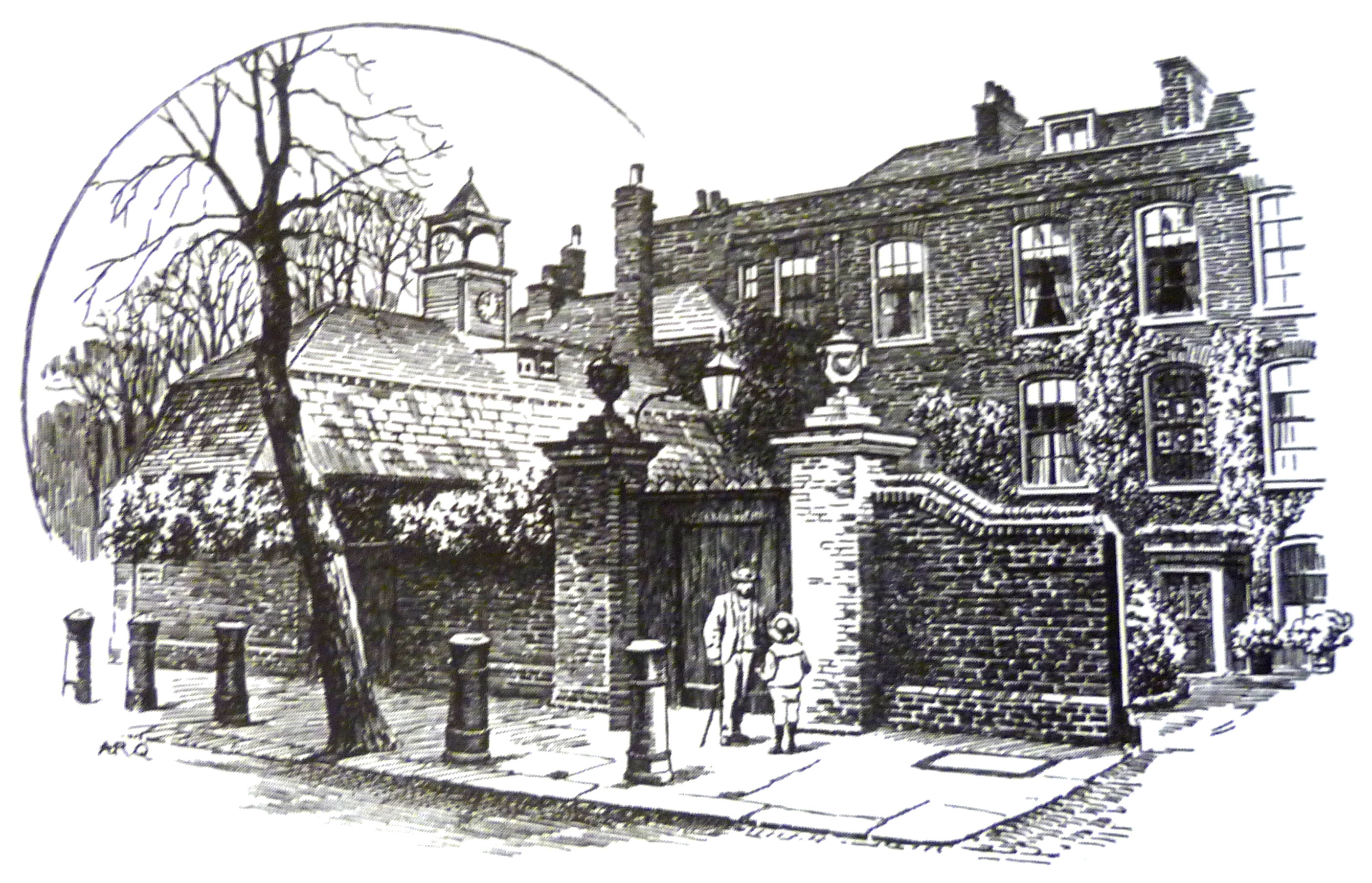
Cannon Hall, drawn by A. R. Quinton, 1911

== History ==
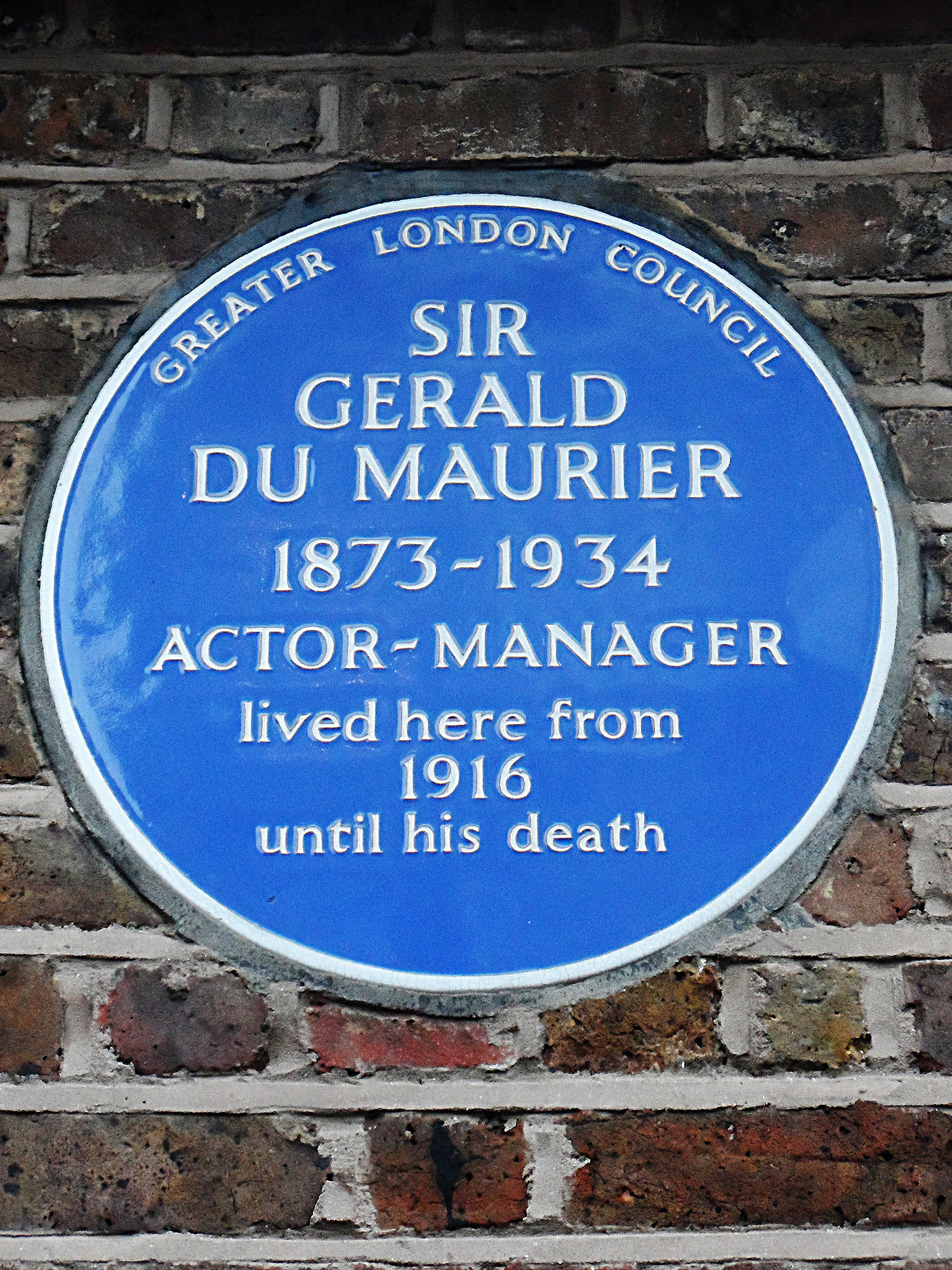
The blue plaque to Sir Gerald Du Maurier

The land was originally known as Rous's Buildings, probably in reference to Joseph Rous who followed John Duffield as lessee of the Wells Estate, and was originally a much larger area that went as far as Well Road and Christchurch Hill and included three other houses.

One of the Hampstead lock-ups was located in the garden wall adjoining Cannon Lane until it was closed following the formation of the Metropolitan Police Force by Sir Robert Peel in 1829. A magistrates' court also sat in the stable block and the house was occupied by a number of magistrates at different times, one of whom was James Marshall, who lived at Cannon Hall in the 1870s.

Sarah Holford, a widow, leased the house from at least 1752, and probably from as early as 1745, as a print was published of the Long Room "from Mrs. Holford's garden" in that year.

In 1780, the house was occupied by Sir Noah Thomas (1720–92), physician-in-ordinary to King George III.

Sir James Cosmo Melvill (1792–1861), of the East India Company, bought Cannon Hall around 1838, the year in which he became chief secretary of the company. The cannons which he placed around the site gave it the name Cannon Hall from then on.

Actor-manager Gerald du Maurier purchased the house in 1916 and lived there with his wife Muriel Beaumont and three daughters until his death in 1934. The house has a blue plaque in his memory, erected by the Greater London Council. The author Daphne du Maurier (1907–1989) was aged about 9 when her father bought the house, and she grew up there with her sisters Angela (1904–2002) and Jeanne (1911–1996).

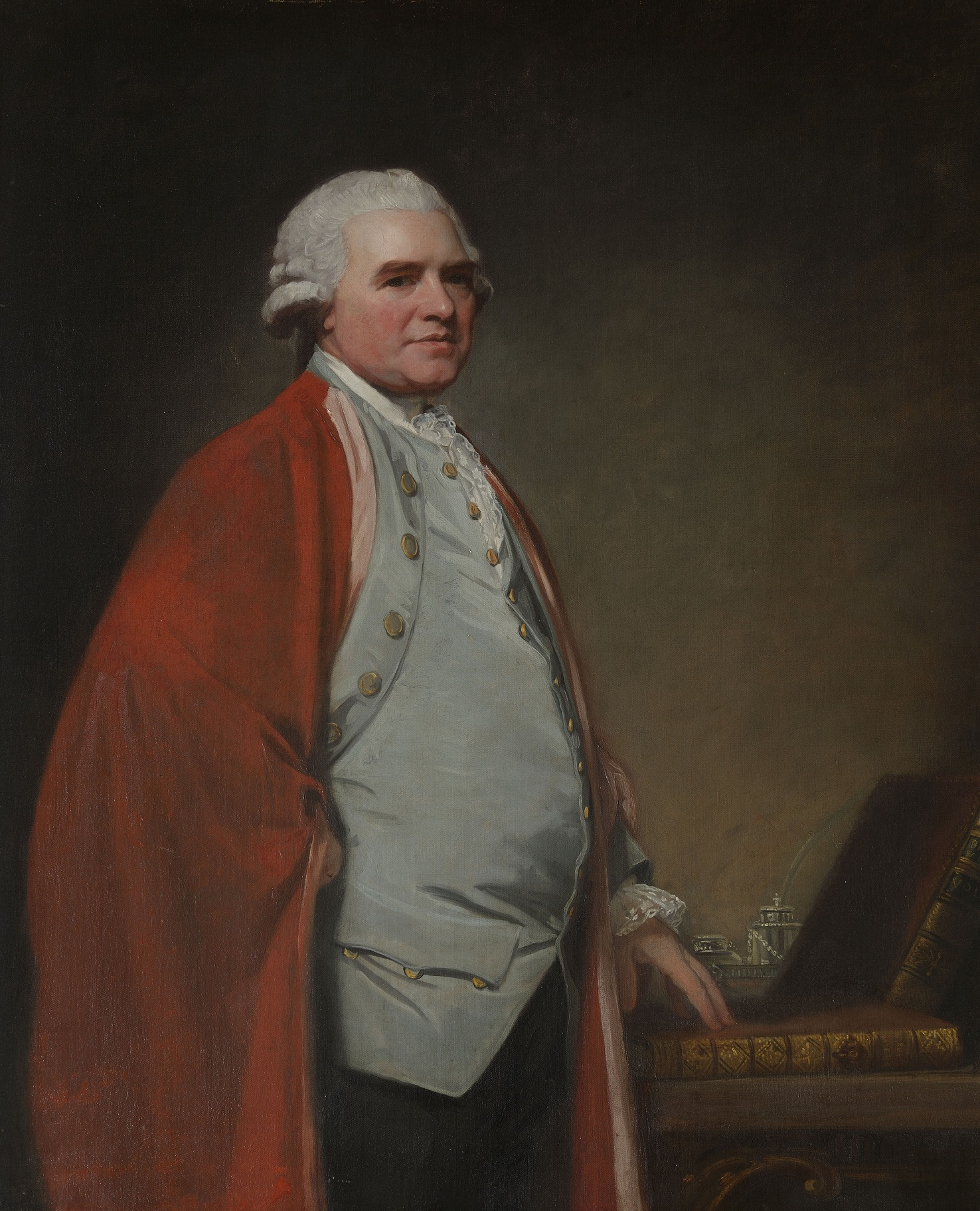
Sir Noah Thomas by George Romney, 1781

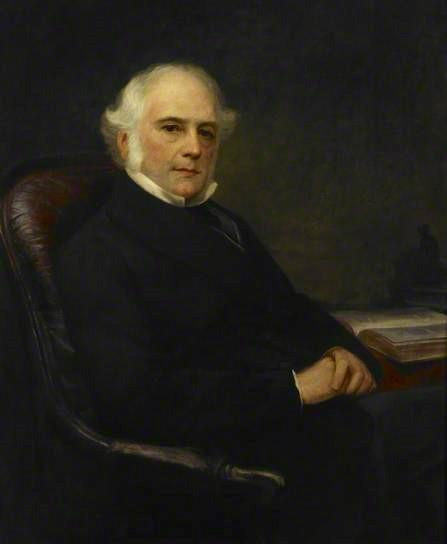
James Cosmo Melvill by Eton Upton Ellis, c. 1853

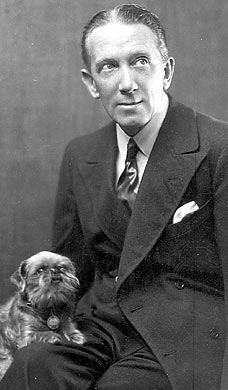
Gerald du Maurier

== In film ==
Cannon Hall featured in the film Bunny Lake is Missing (1965), starring Laurence Olivier and directed and produced by Otto Preminger; the house was given the fictional address 30 Frogmore End.

It was also featured in the film Tenet (2020), starring John David Washington and directed and produced by Christopher Nolan.

== Sale ==
In 2014 the property was placed on sale with an asking price of £32 million. In 2015 it sold for £28 million, one of the highest prices realised for a private home in London that year.
