= Salvatore DiMauro =

Italian neurologist

- Born: November 14, 1939 (age 86); Verona, Italy
- Other names: Billi
- Education: University of Padua
- Occupations: Director, H. Houston Merritt Clinical Research Center
- Employer: Columbia University Medical Center
- Known for: Mitochondrial and metabolic disorders
- Title: Lucy G. Moses Professor of Neurology
- Spouse: Sheila Hayes
- Children: 2
- Relatives: 1 sister, Franca

Salvatore DiMauro, M.D., was born in Verona, Italy, November 14, 1939, graduated in medicine from the University of Padua in 1963 and completed his residency in neurology in 1966. He then completed a postdoctoral fellowship in the Department of Neurology at the University of Pennsylvania. His research focuses on genetic errors of energy metabolism and he defines disease entities using both biochemical and molecular approaches. As an "enzyme defect hunter", DiMauro has documented the molecular basis of many enzyme deficiencies, including carnitine palmitoyltransferase deficiency, the first error of fatty acid oxidation to be recognized in humans. With colleagues at the University of Pennsylvania in the 1970s, DiMauro studied the second patient ever with Luft's disease, the prototypical (though also the rarest) mitochondrial disease. He is a Professor of Neurology at Columbia University, director of the H. Houston Merritt Clinical Research Center for Muscular Dystrophy and Associate Chair of Related Diseases for Laboratory Research and Training. He is a trustee on the United Mitochondrial Disease Foundation. Prof. DiMauro has scores of publications. He also has several books to his credit. His last book is titled Mitochondrial Medicine and was published in 2006.

== Bibliography ==
- The Molecular and Genetic Basis of Neurologic and Psychiatric Disease By Roger N. Rosenberg, Salvatore DiMauro, Henry L Paulson, Louis Ptácek, Eric J Nestler, 4th edition, 2007 ISBN 0-7817-6956-6
- Mitochondrial Medicine, 2006, Publisher: Taylor & Francis, Inc. ISBN 978-1-84214-288-2
