= Desmond Tester =

English actor (1919–2002)

- Born: Sydney Desmond Tester; 17 February 1919; London, England
- Died: 31 December 2002 (aged 83); Sydney, New South Wales, Australia
- Occupations: Actor; TV host; TV executive; screenwriter; director; Producer
- Spouse(s): Evelyn Redfern Stuart (5 children); Valerie Jones (partner)

Sydney Desmond Tester (17 February 1919 – 31 December 2002) was an English film and television actor, host and executive. He was born in London, England, and started his career as a child actor; among his most notable roles was that of the ill-fated boy Stevie in the Alfred Hitchcock film Sabotage (1936).

== Early life ==
Tester made his first stage appearance at the age of 11, in The Merry Wives of Windsor, in 1930, receiving positive reviews from London; he also appeared as Emil in Emil and the Detectives. From 1934 he became better known as a child actor in films in his native Britain. Tester's characters were often doomed to untimely deaths in such early films as Carol Reed's Midshipman Easy (1935), Tudor Rose (1936), The Stars Look Down (1939) and Sabotage. He was a musical prodigy in Robert Stevenson's Non-Stop New York (1937) and a drummer boy in The Drum (1938).

== Emigration to Australia and post-war career ==
After the Second World War Tester moved to Australia and embarked on careers in radio, theatre and television. After television broadcasting began in Australia Tester soon found work hosting the localised version of the British panel game show What's My Line? and in a variety of children's programmes including Cabbage Quiz and Kaper Kops with Reg Gorman and Rod Hull. He spent 15 years at Channel Nine, taking charge of children's programming, and became more involved behind the scenes in production and publicity. He later moved to Reg Grundy Productions, but eventually left the industry entirely due to a dislike of the overall management culture.

Tester was the compere of "Desmond and the Channel 9-Pins," an Australian children's television series which aired from 1957 to 1962 on Sydney station TCN-9. He introduced the Bee Gees for their first TV appearance in 1960. By 1961 Tester had retired from appearing on screen on the series, but continued to write, produce and direct the show.

In 1974 he revived his stage acting career on the advice of Hayes Gordon and appeared in numerous productions including productions by playwrights Arthur Miller and John Ewing. He also had occasional minor roles in various films, such as Barry McKenzie Holds His Own (1974) and The Wild Duck (1983).

== Personal life and death ==
On 10 November 1939 Tester was registered as a conscientious objector, conditional upon performing farm work, which he did on a pig farm, saying he liked it. He also said, "We know from history that war does not rid the world of fear. War breeds war and greater fear."

He married Evelyn Stuart and had five children – Jolyon (deceased), Dermot, Giles, Toby and Simon and five grandchildren – Sally, Daisy, Sam, Georgia, and Max.

For the last 29 years of his life he resided in Lindfield on Sydney's North Shore with his partner Valerie Jones.

Desmond Tester died on 31 December 2002, in Sydney, at the age of 83.

== Selected filmography ==
- The Night Club Queen (1934) – Messenger Boy in Nightclub (uncredited)
- Midshipman Easy (1935) – Gossett
- Late Extra (1935) – Copy Boy (uncredited)
- Tudor Rose (1936) – Edward VI
- The Beloved Vagabond (1936) – Asticot
- Sabotage (1936) – Stevie
- Non-Stop New York (1937) – Arnold James
- The Drum (1938) – Bill Holder
- The Stars Look Down (1940) – Hughie Fenwick
- An Englishman's Home (1940) – Billy Brown
- The Turners of Prospect Road (1947) – Nicky
- Barry McKenzie Holds His Own (1974) – Marcel Escargot
- Save the Lady (1982) – Captain Playfair

== Bibliography ==
- John Holmstrom, The Moving Picture Boy: An International Encyclopaedia from 1895 to 1995, Norwich: Michael Russell, 1996, p. 91.
