= Patrick Ferguson Millard =

English painter (1902–1972)

Patrick Ferguson Millard (1902–1972) was an English artist, lecturer and writer.

== Family ==
Patrick Ferguson Millard was born at Aspatria, Cumberland in March 1902. His father the Rev. F. L. H. Millard M.A. was vicar of St. Kentigern's Church between 1898 and 1905. His mother was the daughter of Robert S. Ferguson (1837-1900) M.A., LL.M, F.S.A., Mayor of Carlisle in 1881 and again in 1882. Ferguson was also a local historian, author and President of the Cumberland and Westmorland Archaeological Society and editor of its transactions. He was mainly responsible for the founding of Tullie House museum, art gallery, library and at one time the home of the School of Art.

== Education ==
It was Millard's godfather, the one time secretary to John Ruskin, the art critic and political economist, W. G. Collingwood who first taught him to draw. Millard's general school education was undertaken at St John's School, Leatherhead, Surrey. Afterwards he studied consecutively at Carlisle School of Art, the Liverpool School of Art, and the Royal Academy Schools, London (1921–25). At the age of 23 he won the Royal Academy Gold Medal and the Travelling Scholarship for painting. During this period Walter Sickert taught one day a week and it was he who advised him to use his travelling scholarship to go to Paris and this he did, travelling additionally to Italy and Spain, where he fell in love with the work of El Greco at a time when he greatly undervalued. In 1928, he was elected member of the Royal Society of British Artists and shortly afterwards he began to exhibit his work in London and overseas. This was followed by several one man exhibitions.

== Academic teaching ==
In addition to a number of part-time teaching posts in art schools he held a number of prestigious full-time positions. Towards the end of the 1920s he taught at the Richmond School of Art, where he met and shared a studio with John Piper. He then moved to St John's Wood Art School (1930–38), where he was joint head at a time when that institution was considered the most progressive of the London art schools. After a three-year period where he was Art Master and House Tutor at Oundle School, Northamptonshire he became senior lecturer in art at Shoreditch Teacher Training College in 1944. He held that position until 1950 when he became headmaster of Polytechnic School of Art, Regent Street, London. In 1958 he became Principal at Goldsmiths College from 1958 until his retirement in 1967.

== Artist ==
Well-known students of Millard included John Minton and Michael Ayrton, as well as Nancy Haig, and visiting lecturers at "the Wood" included John Piper and Vanessa Bell. Millard's classes buzzed with ideas. As Nancy Haig put it, "He would let you go for a bit, till you were in a helpless mess and then sort you out." Millard was a gifted animal draughtsman and frequently took parties of students to the Regents Park Zoo in order to draw the exotic animals they found there. The drawings he himself produced on these occasions have nothing of the character of mere demonstration drawings but have all of the grandeur of animal drawings by David Jones or John Skeaping. His other works on paper were greatly influenced by a deep admiration for the work of the English Romantic artist, Samuel Palmer. He exhibited regularly at the Royal Academy, the Royal Society of British Artists and annual show, the New England Art Club and with The London Group.

== Author ==
Millard was also the author of Student's Book of Life Drawings, published by Sir Isaac Pitman & Sons Ltd, UK (1938); and Birds of the Village, published by Penguin Puffin, Harmondsworth (1945).

== Death ==
Patrick Ferguson Millard died in 1972.

== Bibliography ==
- Frances Spalding (1991). Dance Till the Stars Come Down - A Biography of John Minton. Sevenoaks: Hodder & Stoughton.
