= Gerald du Maurier =

British actor (1873–1934)

Sir Gerald du Maurier
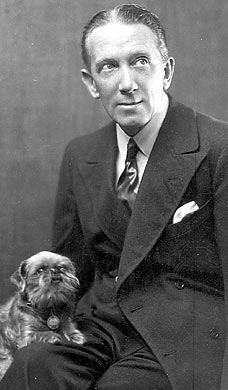
- Born: Gerald Hubert Edward Busson du Maurier; 26 March 1873; Hampstead, London, England
- Died: 11 April 1934 (aged 61); Hampstead, London, England
- Occupations: Actor and manager
- Years active: 1890s–1934
- Spouse: Muriel Beaumont (m. 1903)
- Children: Angela du Maurier; Daphne du Maurier; Jeanne du Maurier
- Parent(s): George du Maurier; Emma Wightwick
- Relatives: Guy du Maurier (brother); Sylvia Llewelyn Davies (sister); George, Jack, Peter, Michael, and Nicholas Llewelyn Davies (nephews); Mary Anne Clarke (great grandmother)

Sir Gerald Hubert Edward Busson du Maurier (26 March 1873 – 11 April 1934) was an English actor and manager. He was the son of author George du Maurier and his wife, Emma Wightwick, and the brother of Sylvia Llewelyn Davies. In 1903, he married the actress Muriel Beaumont, with whom he had three daughters: writers Angela du Maurier (1904–2002) and Dame Daphne du Maurier (1907–1989), and painter Jeanne du Maurier (1911–1997). His popularity was due to his subtle and naturalistic acting: a "delicately realistic style of acting that sought to suggest rather than to state the deeper emotions". His Times obituary said of his career: "His parentage assured him of engagements in the best of company to begin with; but it was his own talent that took advantage of them."

== Early life ==
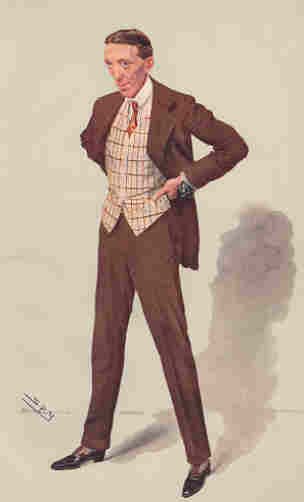
du Maurier caricatured by Spy for Vanity Fair, 1907.

Gerald Hubert Edward Busson du Maurier was born on 26 March 1873 in Hampstead, London, the son of Emma (Wightwick) and George du Maurier, author and Punch cartoonist, who created the character of Svengali in the 1894 novel Trilby. During his childhood the family home was at New Grove House in Hampstead Grove.

He attended Heath Mount School and Harrow School. He initially pursued a career in business, but it did not suit him, and he began working as an actor. He obtained his first engagement, a small part in Sydney Grundy's An Old Jew, by means of his father's friend John Hare, manager of the Garrick Theatre.

== J.M. Barrie ==
After playing a number of small roles before 1900, including a part in his father's popular drama Trilby with Herbert Beerbohm Tree in 1895, his popularity became assured as a result of his acclaimed performance in major roles during the premieres of two J.M. Barrie plays: as Ernest in The Admirable Crichton during 1902, and the dual role of George Darling and Captain Hook (instead of Seymour Hicks, who had refused the part) in Peter Pan, or The Boy Who Wouldn't Grow Up, at the Duke of York's Theatre, London, on 27 December 1904. He also played in other Barrie plays, including Dear Brutus.

In 1902, during The Admirable Crichton, also in the cast was actress Muriel Beaumont as Lady Agatha. They were married five months later on 11 April 1903 at St Peter, Cranley Gardens, Kensington. Du Maurier and his wife had three children: the actress and writer Angela du Maurier (1904–2002), the writer Daphne du Maurier (1907–1989) and the painter Jeanne du Maurier (1911–1997). His wife retired from the stage in 1910.

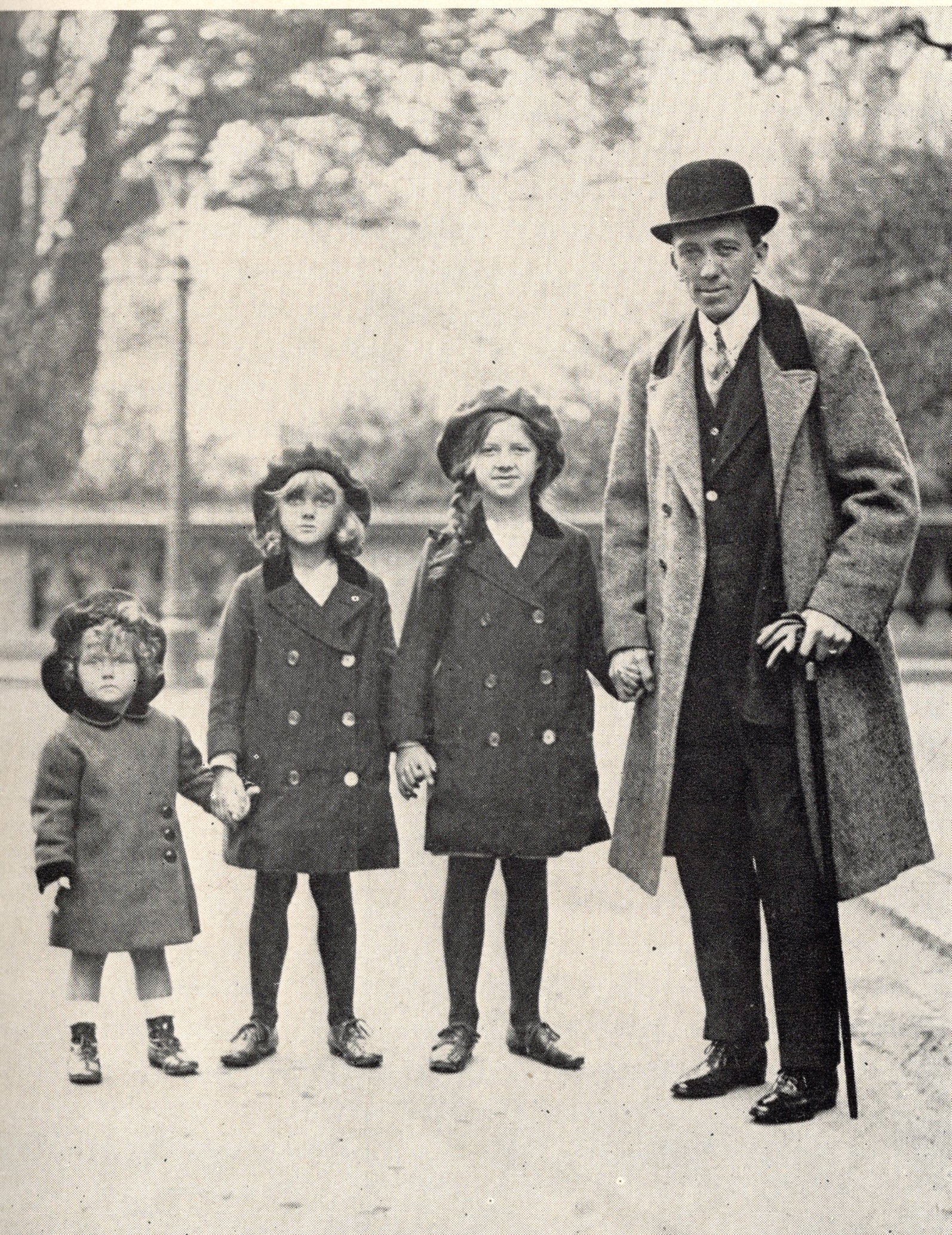
Gerald du Maurier with his three daughters, Angela, Daphne and Jeanne (1913)

His nephews, his sister Sylvia Llewelyn Davies's sons, were the inspiration for Peter Pan and other boy characters of Barrie's fiction. The character of Wendy Darling in Peter Pan shares one of her middle names with du Maurier's daughter Angela, who in later years portrayed Wendy onstage herself.

== Theatre ==
With Frank Curzon, he co-managed Wyndham's Theatre from 1910 to 1925, and then worked for the St James's Theatre. Knighted during 1922 at the height of his popularity, he continued to perform throughout his life. During later years he acted in cinema roles such as Lord Camber's Ladies (1932), a German doctor in I Was a Spy (1933), the emperor's valet in Catherine the Great (1934) and, soon before his final illness, Weissensee in the Michael Balcon version of Jew Süss (1934).

== Du Maurier cigarettes ==
Du Maurier was a regular cigarette smoker, and the du Maurier brand was named after him as a paid endorsement deal (he did not smoke them himself), to which he agreed to help pay taxes owed.

== Charity work ==
He served as President of the Actors' Orphanage Fund (now the Actors' Charitable Trust) from 1914 to his death, when he was succeeded by Noël Coward.

== Freemason ==
He joined the Freemasons' Green Room Lodge No. 2957 on 4 November 1904, an actors' lodge which included Leedham Bantock, Fred Terry and George Grossmith Jr. among its members.

== Death ==
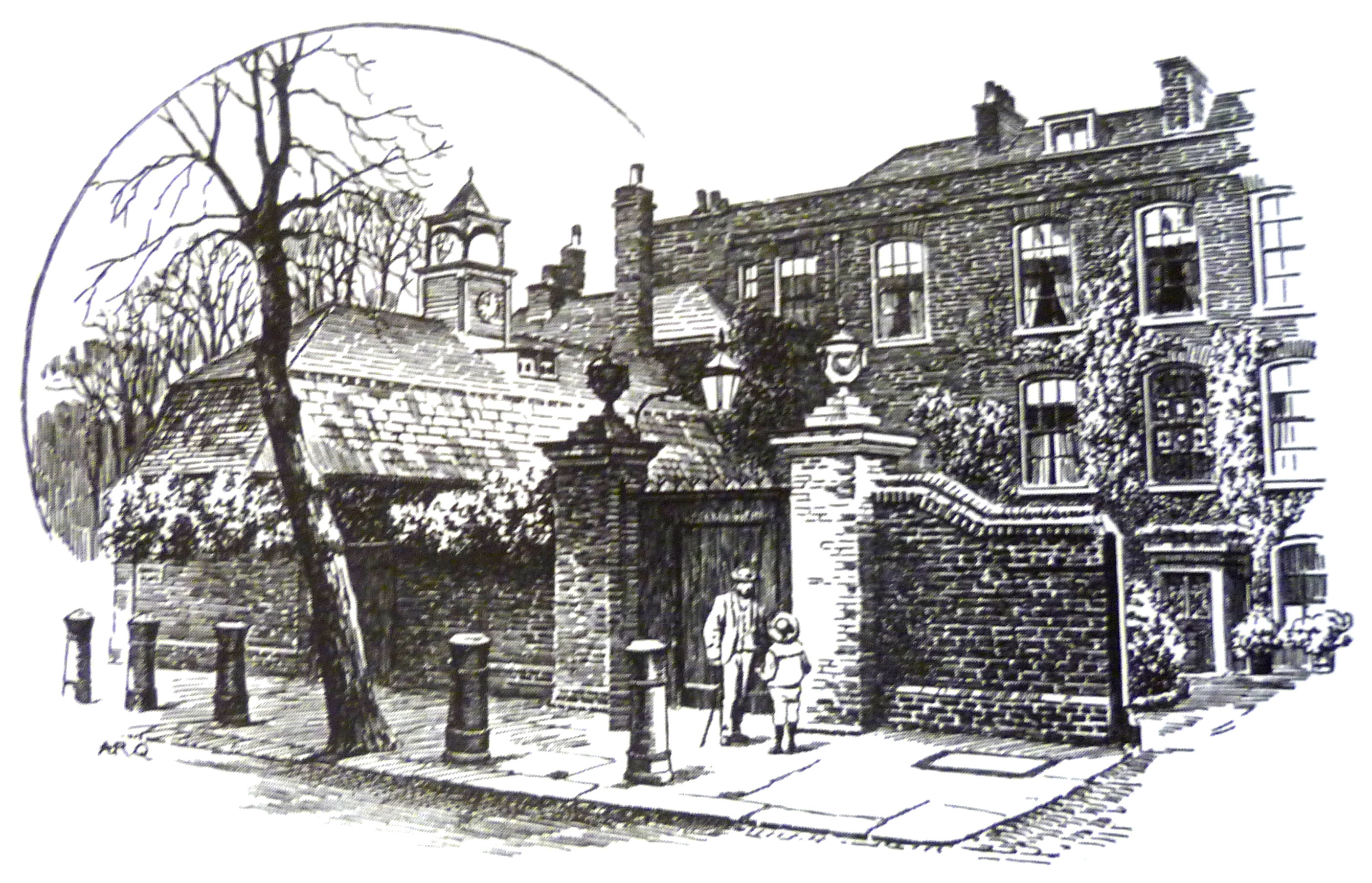
Cannon Hall, Hampstead, drawn by A.R. Quinton, 1911, the family home in London from 1916 and where du Maurier died.

He died on 11 April 1934 of colon cancer, at Cannon Hall, Cannon Place, Hampstead, his home since 1916. A blue plaque has been placed at the house in his memory.

His middle daughter Daphne refused to attend his funeral but wrote a biography of him – Gerald: A Portrait – which was published soon after his death.

== Filmography ==
Year	Title	Role	Notes
1917	Masks and Faces	Hunsdon	Film debut
1917	Everybody's Business	Tom Briton	Short
1917	Justice	Falder	
1920	Unmarried	Rev. Roland Allington	
1930	Escape	Captain Matt Denant	
1932	Lord Camber's Ladies	Dr. Napier	
1933	I Was a Spy	Doctor	
1934	The Scotland Yard Mystery	Commissioner Stanton	
1934	The Rise of Catherine the Great	Lecocq	
1934	Jew Süss	Weissensee	Final film

== Selected stage credits ==
- Doormats (1912)
- Bulldog Drummond with H.C. McNeile (1921)
- The Dancers by Viola Tree (1923)
- Behold, We Live by John Van Druten (1932)

== References and sources ==
Sources

- Harding, James (2004). "Du Maurier, Sir Gerald Hubert Edward Busson (1873–1934)". Oxford Dictionary of National Biography (online ed.). Oxford University Press. doi:10.1093/ref:odnb/32928. (Subscription, Wikipedia Library access or UK public library membership required.)
- Sir Gerald du Maurier, Actor, Manager and Producer, Obituary, The Times, 12 April 1934
