= Vanessa DiMauro =

Vanessa DiMauro (born 1967) is a community builder and researcher whose work focuses on the role learning and decision-making play in online environments. Born in Hartford, Connecticut DiMauro started her career at TERC (Cambridge, Massachusetts) under the auspices of a National Science Foundation grant to study the ways in which professionals share information in communities of practice online.

She has built online communities in business and education settings globally. One of her most successful communities was Cambridge Information Network, a division of Cambridge Technology Partners, one of the most influential consulting firms during the dot-com era. She has authored numerous academic research and general articles on community building, and frequently teaches about the creation and impact of social networks. Her work is often studied in university programs. Women in Technology International named her one of Boston’s Most Influential Women in Technology.

== Partial bibliography ==
- DiMauro, V., & Gal, S. 1994. Use of telecommunication for reflective discourse of science teacher leaders. Journal of Science Education and Technology, 3(2), 123-135.
- Spitzer, W., Wedding, K., & DiMauro, V. (1995, March 16). Fostering reflective dialogues for teacher professional development [WWW document]. [1997, October 24].
- Muscella, D., & DiMauro, V. (1995).Talking about Science: The case of an electronic conversation. Computer-Supported Collaborative Learning. IN: Erlbaum.
- Jacobs, G., & DiMauro, V. (1995, June) Active readers - What benefits do they gain from an educational telecommunications network? International Conference on Technology and Education, Orlando FL, pp. 379-381.
- Hammer, D. and DiMauro, V. (1996). Student teachers on LabNet: Linking preservice teachers with a professional community. Electronic Journal of Science Education, 1
- DiMauro, V. & Jacobs, G. (1995a). Filling in the professional gaps: Active teacher participation on a telecommunications network. American Educational Research Association Proceedings, San Francisco, CA, April 22, 1995.
- Mauro, V. and Gal, S., "Dimensions of network-mediated space for professional discourse of science teacher leaders," in the Journal of Science Education & Technology, June, 1994.
- Gale Directory of Company Histories http://www.answers.com/topic/cambridge-technology-partners-inc. Retrieved December 20, 2012
