= A. R. Quinton =

English painter (1853–1934)

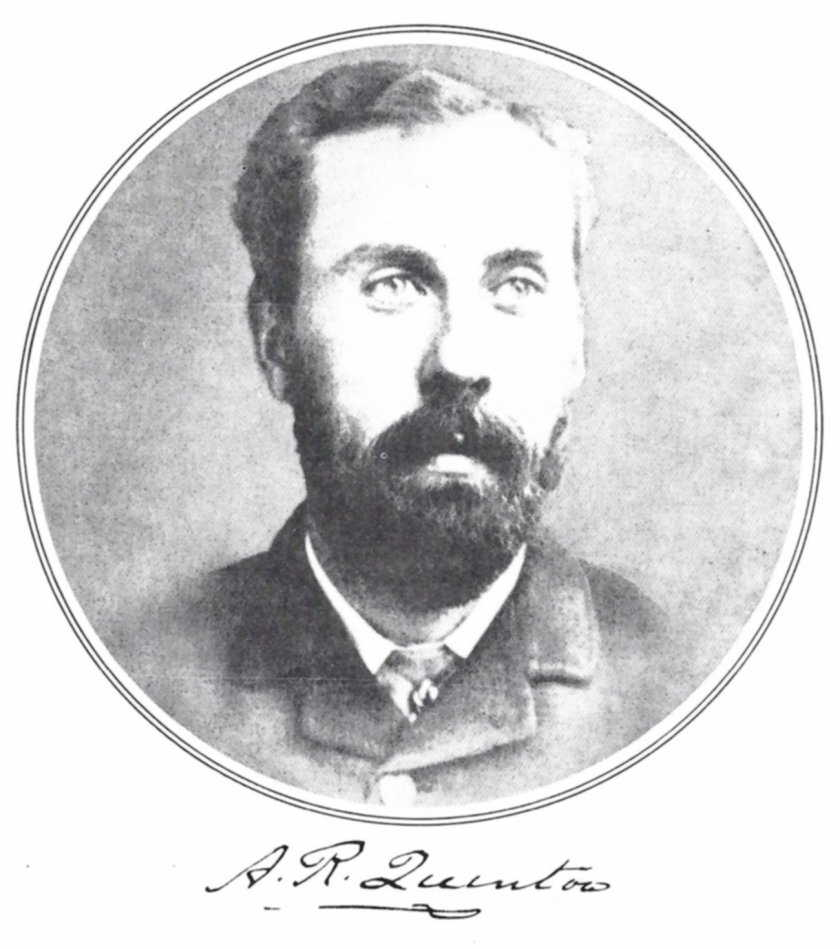
Alfred Robert Quinton

Alfred Robert Quinton (28 October 1853 – 10 December 1934) was an English watercolour artist, known for his paintings of English and Welsh towns, villages, and landscapes, many of which were published as postcards.

== Early life ==
Quinton was born in 1853 in Peckham, which was then a hamlet in Camberwell, Surrey, the youngest of seven children of Elizabeth née Cullum (1818-1886) and John Allen Quinton (1817-1906), a printer, author and journalist. In the summer of 1869, he was attending C. P. Newcombe's Alexandra Park College, Hornsey. On leaving school, he studied painting at the Heatherley School of Fine Art.

== Career ==
Quinton's first work was as a steel engraver, but his ambition was to be a painter. About 1874, he began to work in oils, but soon switched to watercolour, working from a studio in Fleet Street, London, and then from one at Lincoln's Inn. In 1877, Quinton exhibited watercolours at the Royal Society of British Artists. He exhibited several of his watercolours with the Ipswich Fine Art Club in 1882 and 1883.

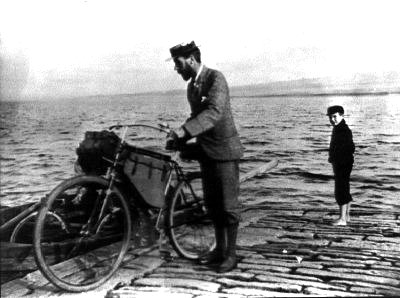
Quinton with his art equipment strapped to his bicycle

In 1895, Quinton and a friend cycled from Land's End to John O'Groats, and Quinton's paintings resulting from the trip were serialised in the Illustrated Sporting and Dramatic News. His artwork became more in demand and he was able to buy a house with a studio in Finchley, then in Middlesex. His work routine would be to travel around England and Wales for three months of the year, mostly during the summer months and often by bicycle, during which he would draw sketches and take photographs of locations which he would work up into paintings in his studio during the winter months. Many of his artworks were published as postcards by Raphael Tuck and J Salmon Ltd which remain popular with today's collectors. His paintings have also been published in many calendars. Well over 2,000 of his paintings were published between 1904 and the time of his death. He also illustrated a number of books including The Historic Thames by Hilaire Belloc.

Quinton exhibited at the Birmingham Royal Society of British Artists; Dudley Gallery; Dowdeswell Gallery; Grosvenor Gallery; Liverpool Walker Art Gallery; Manchester City Art Gallery; the Royal Society of British Artists; Royal Hibernian Academy; Royal Institute of Painters in Water Colour and the Royal Institute of Oil Painters. He exhibited at the Royal Academy but he was later banned from exhibiting there as the authorities were not in favour of his 'commercialisation' of art. His original illustrations for the book The Historic Thames and two other of his paintings were bought by the Duke and Duchess of Kent.

His works remain collectible, as reproduced on postcards, as the original watercolours for the postcards, and his other paintings in oil and watercolours. A large "limited" edition (of 10,000 copies) of Royal Worcester plates, hand-painted after his designs with village scenes, was issued in the 1950s.

== Personal life ==
Quinton married Elizabeth Annie Crompton (1858–1946) at Bolton, Lancashire, in May 1885 and with her had two sons: Leonard Quinton (1886-1981) and Edgar Allan Quinton (1891-1912).

Quinton died in Finchley, Middlesex, on 10 December 1934, and left £9,228 2s 8d (equivalent to £571,017 in 2025) in his will to his widow and his surviving son.

== Gallery ==
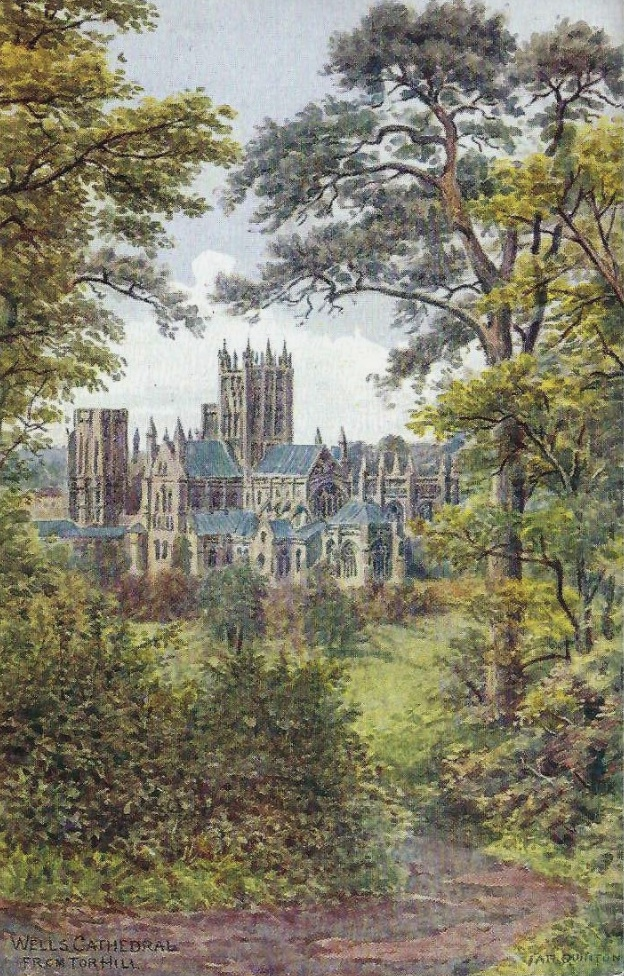
Wells Cathedral from Tor Hill

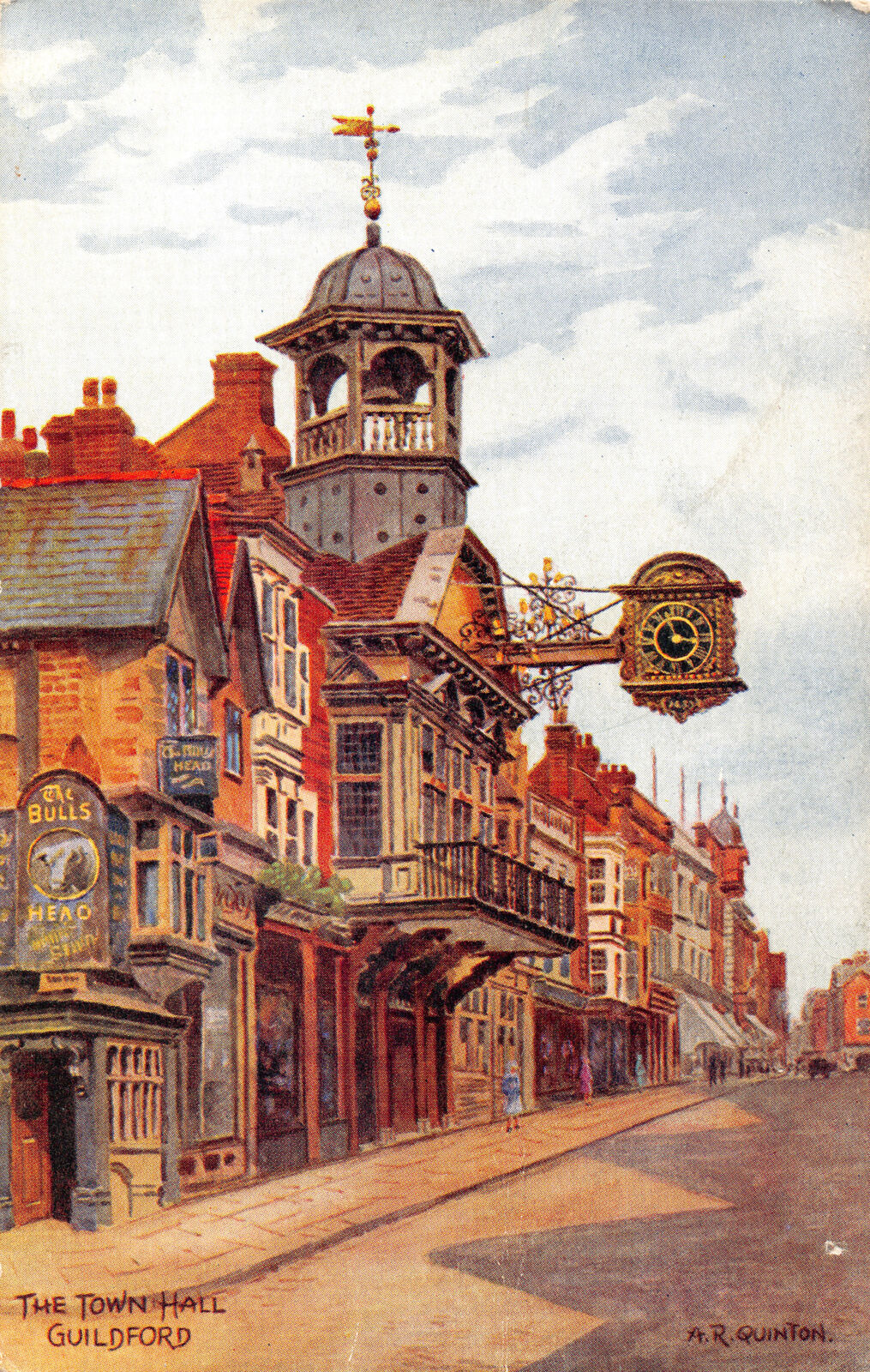
Guildford Guildhall, Surrey

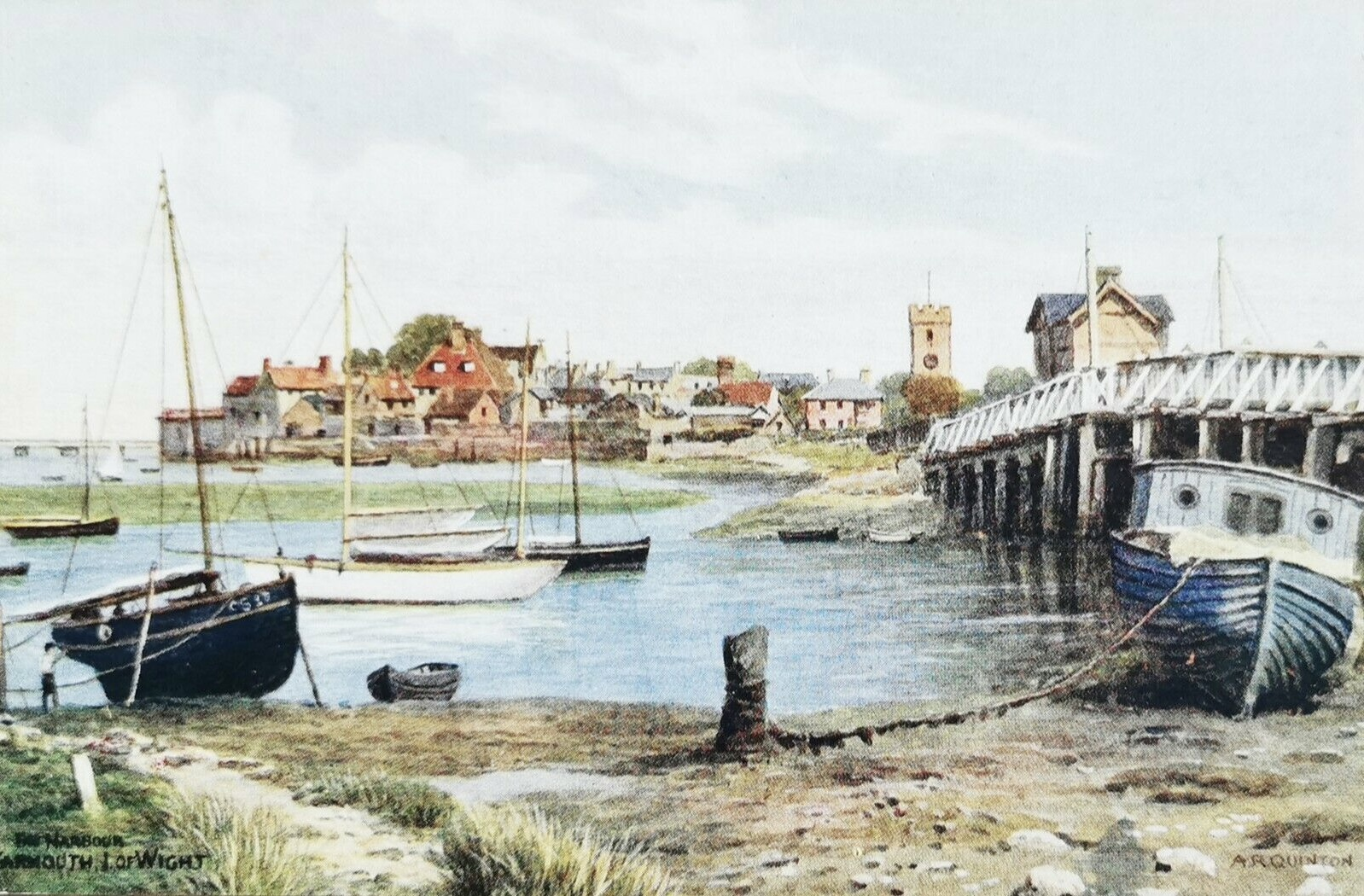
Harbour, Yarmouth, Isle of Wight

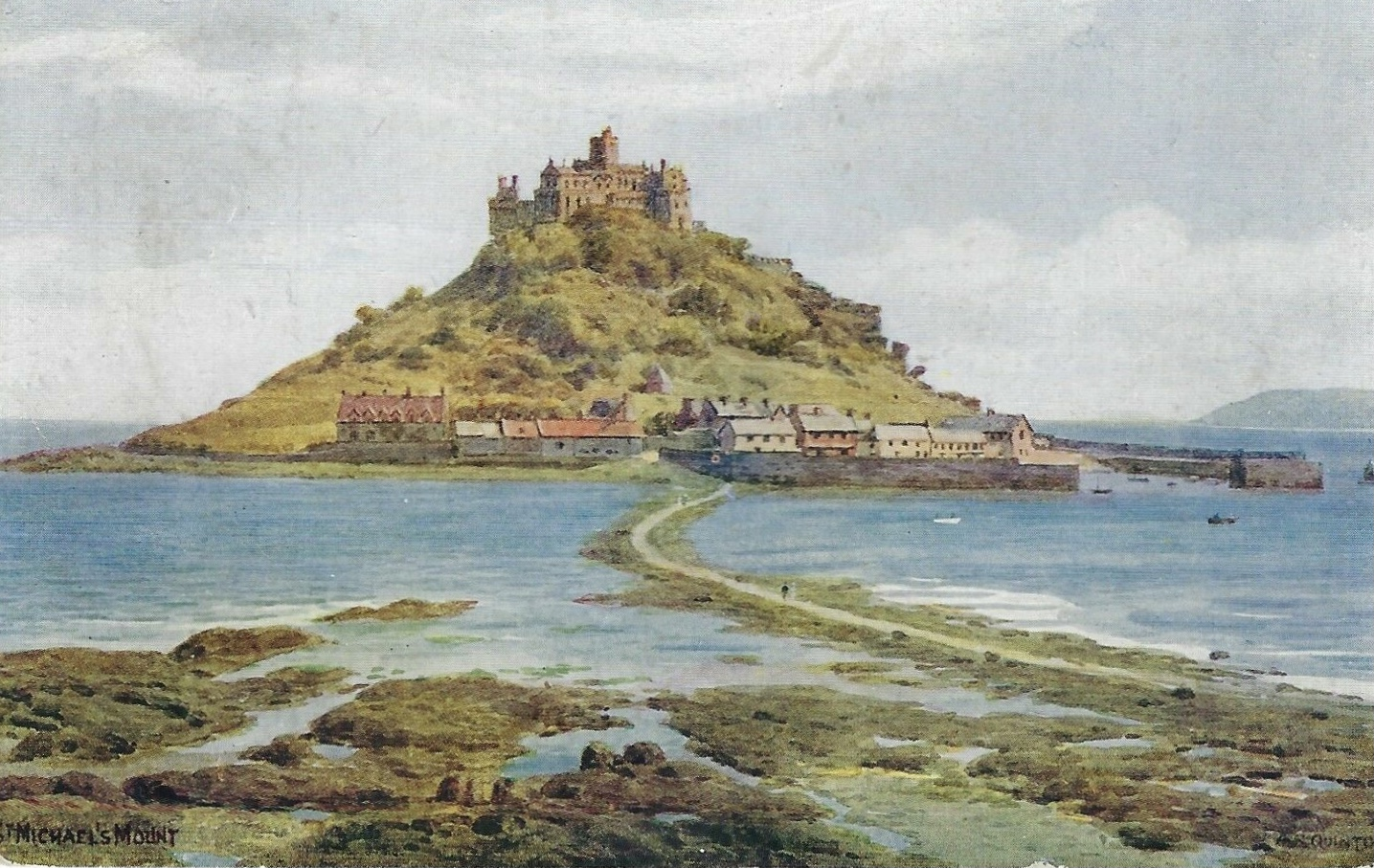
St Michael’s Mount

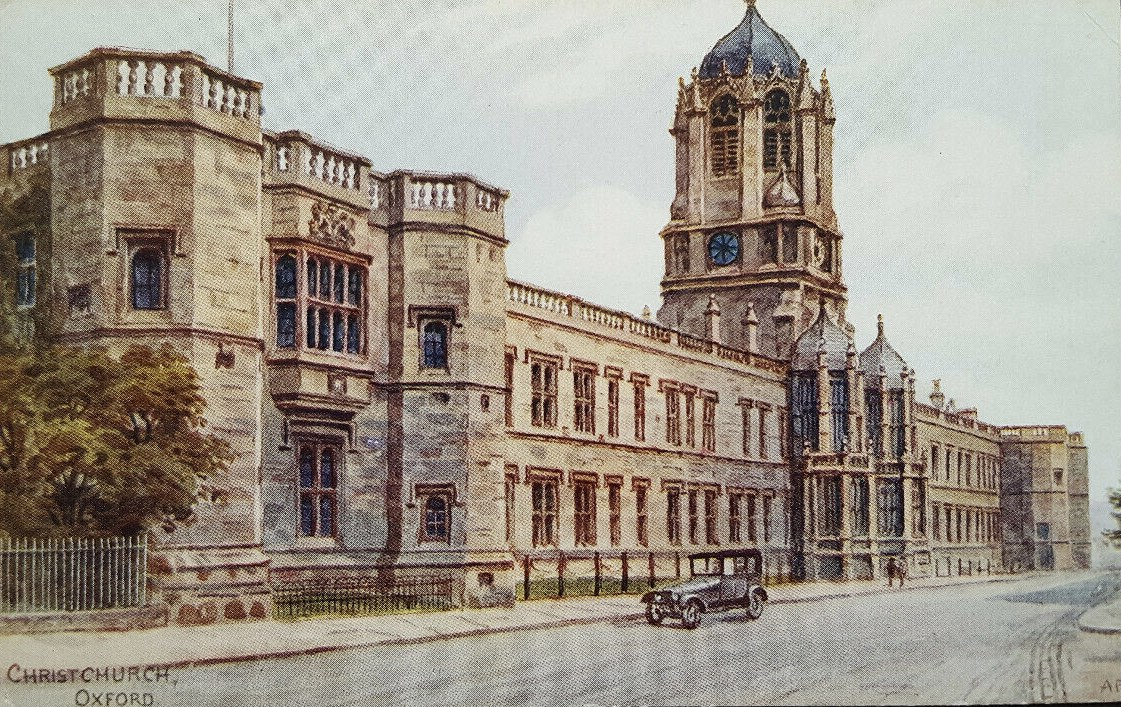
Christ Church, Oxford

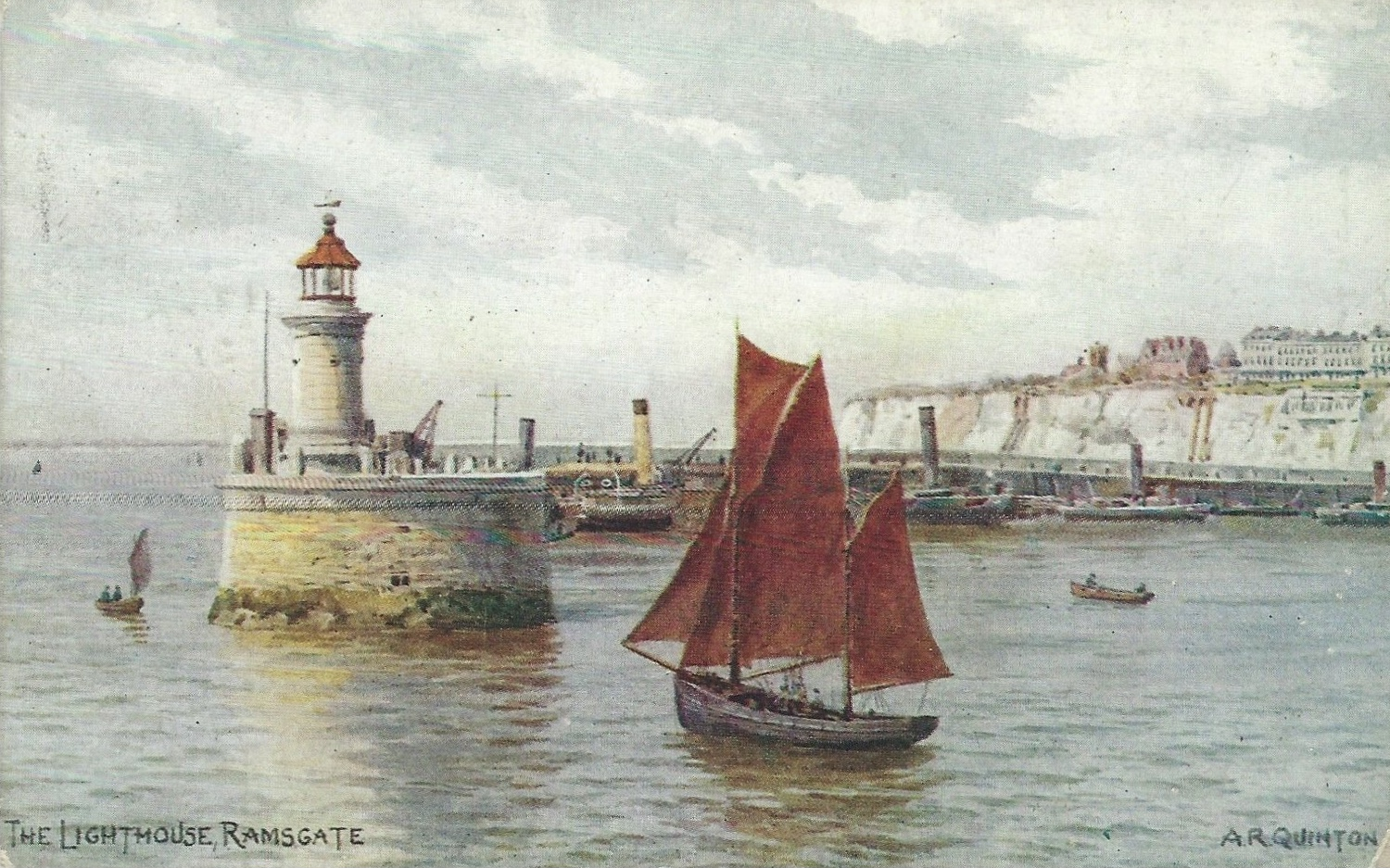
The Lighthouse, Ramsgate

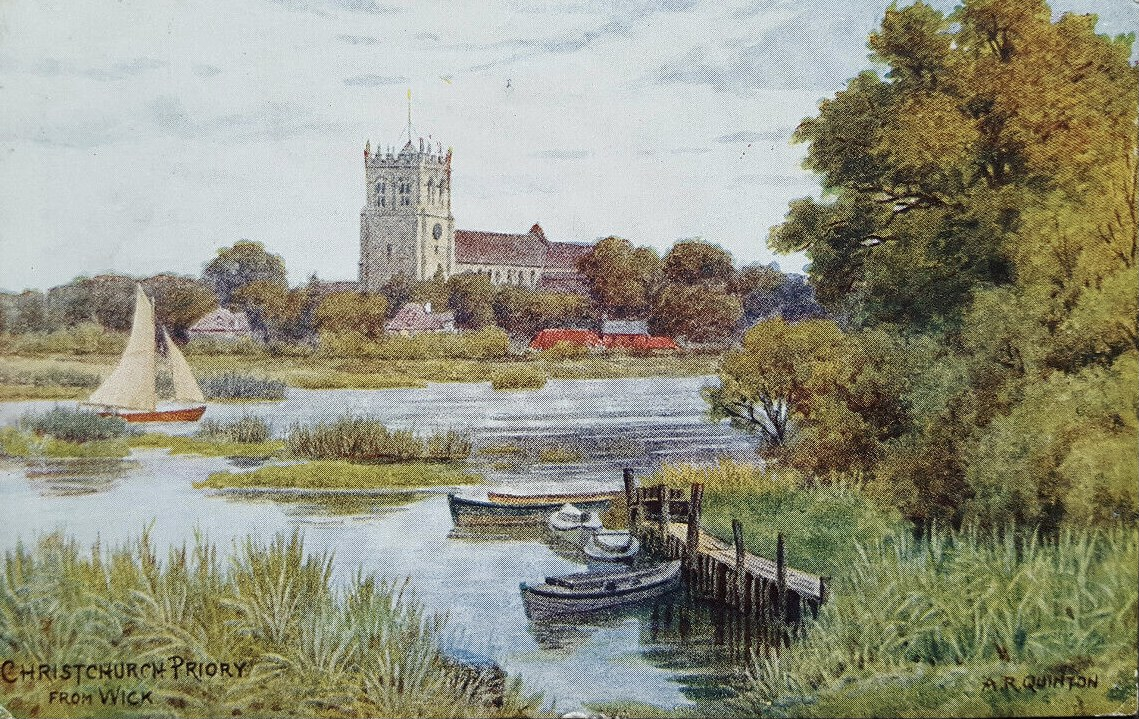
Christchurch Priory from Wick

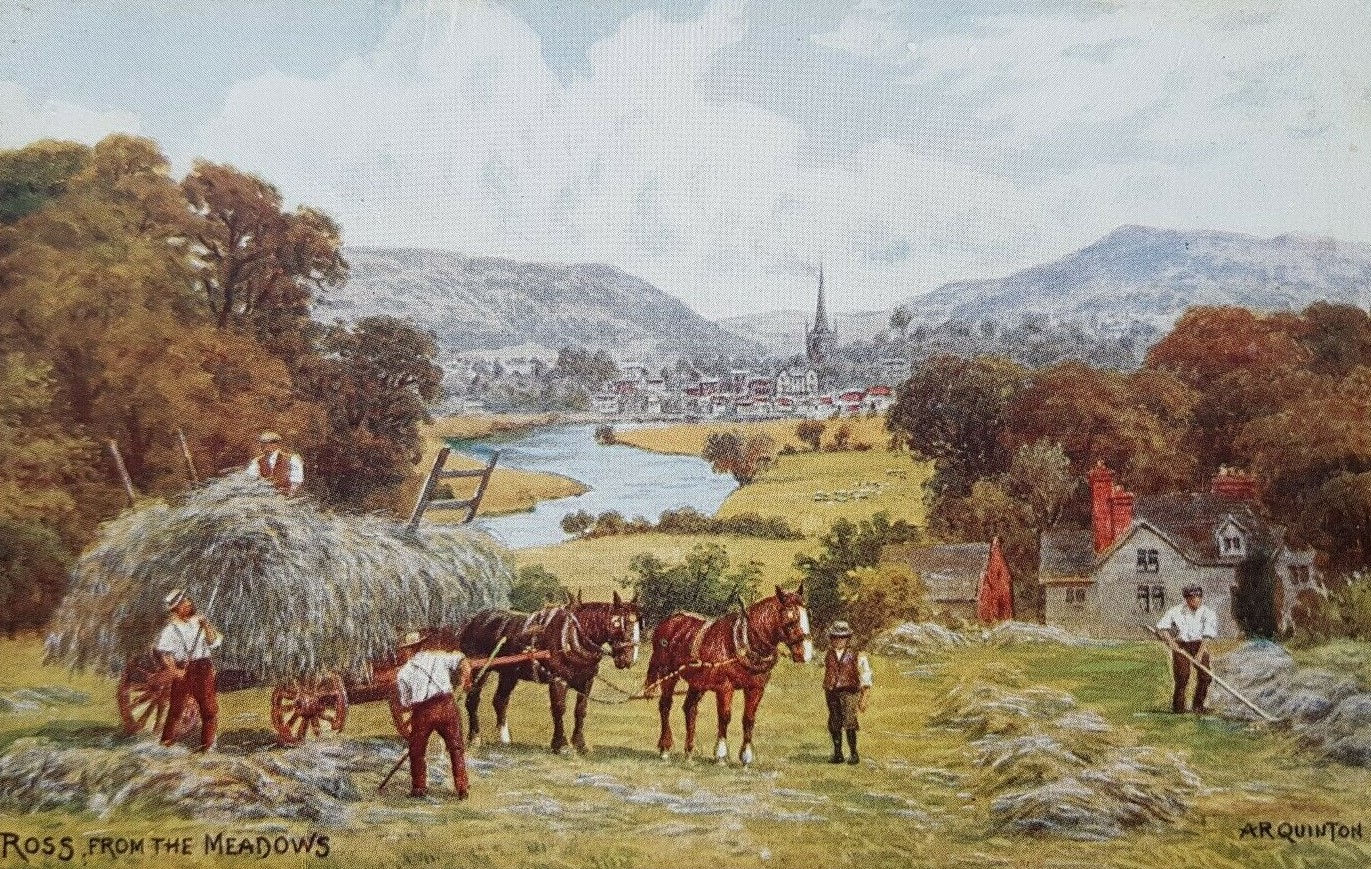
Ross-on-Wye from the Meadows

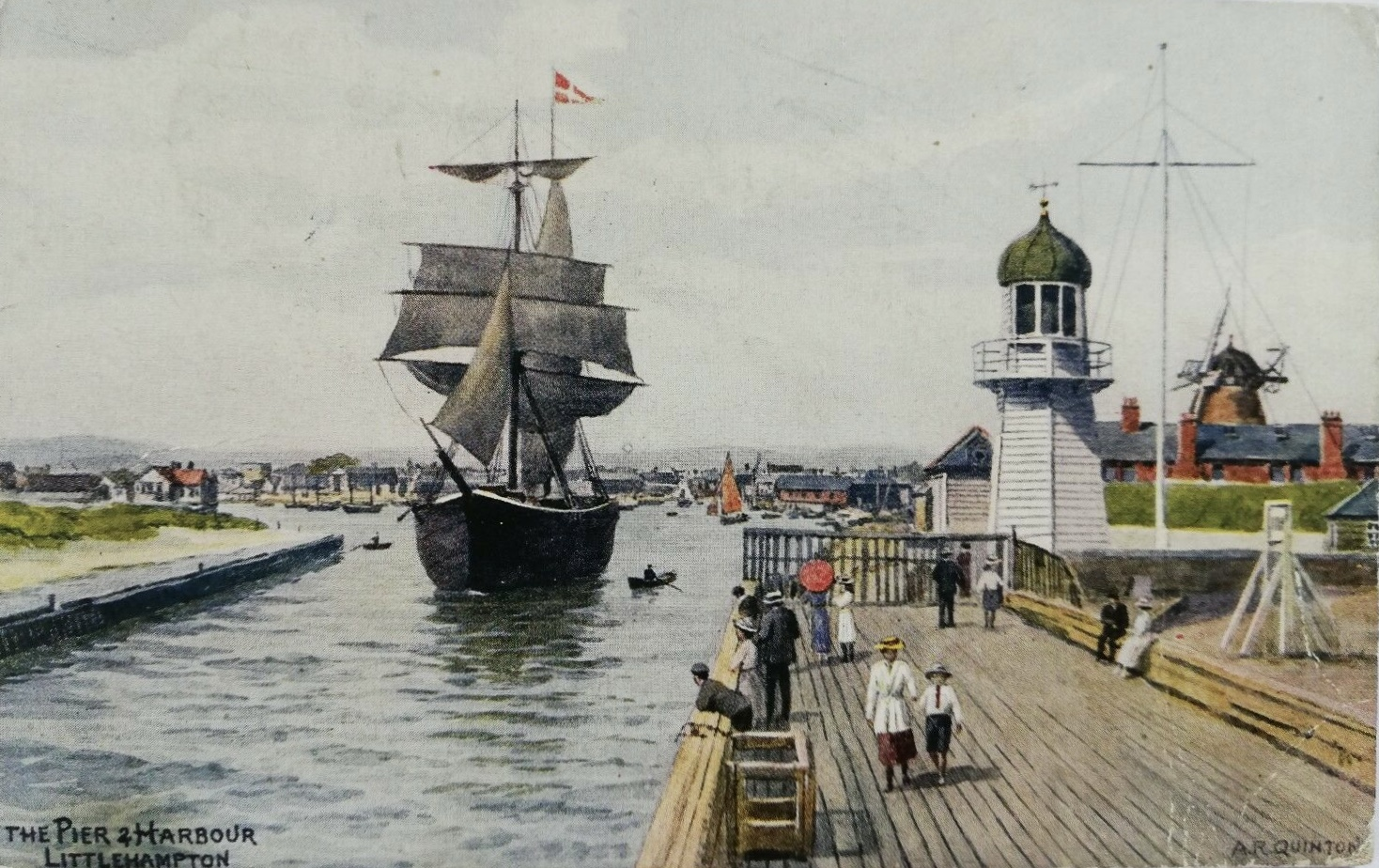
The Pier and Harbour, Littlehampton

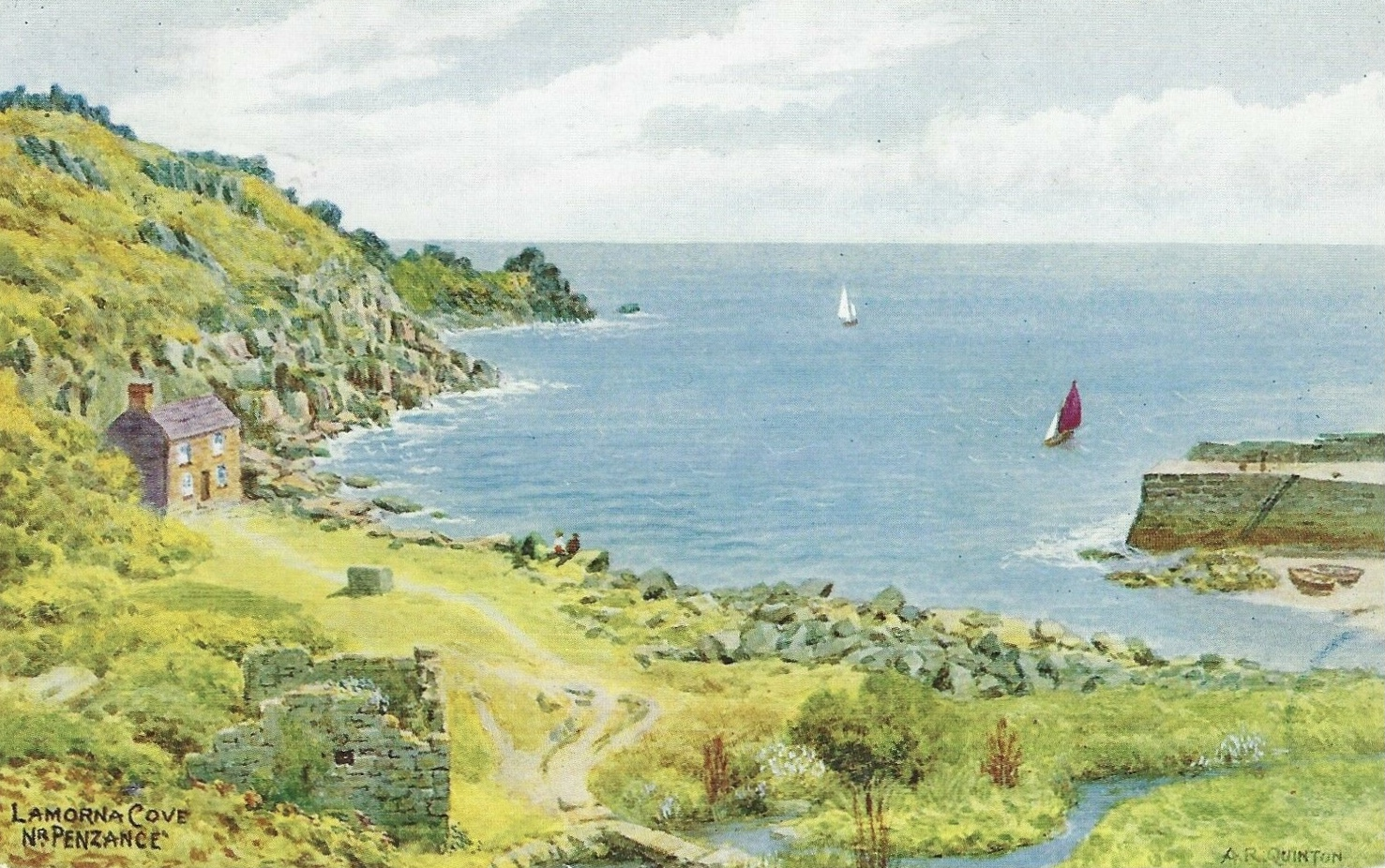
Lamorna Cove near Penzance

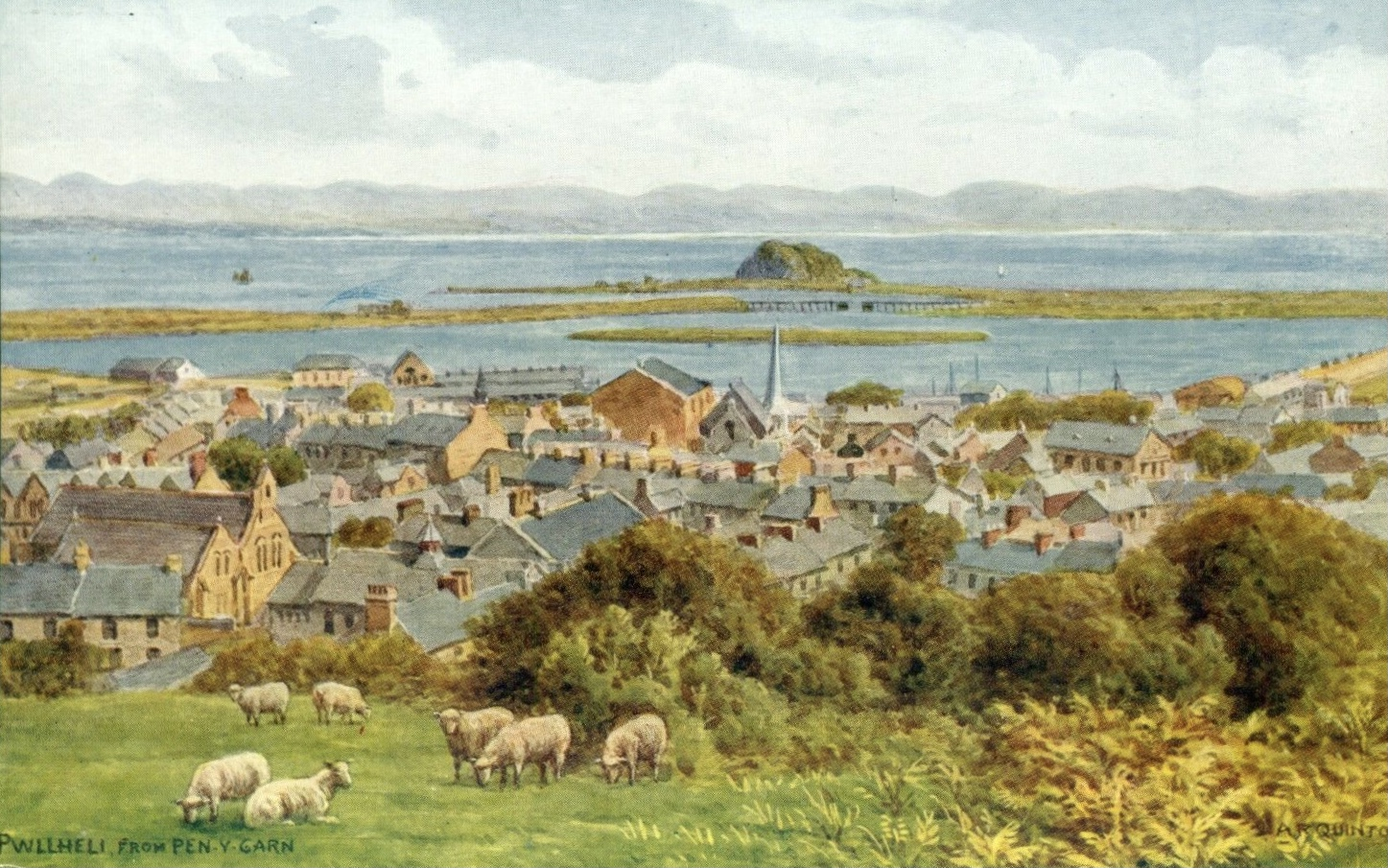
Pwllheli from Pen-y-Garn

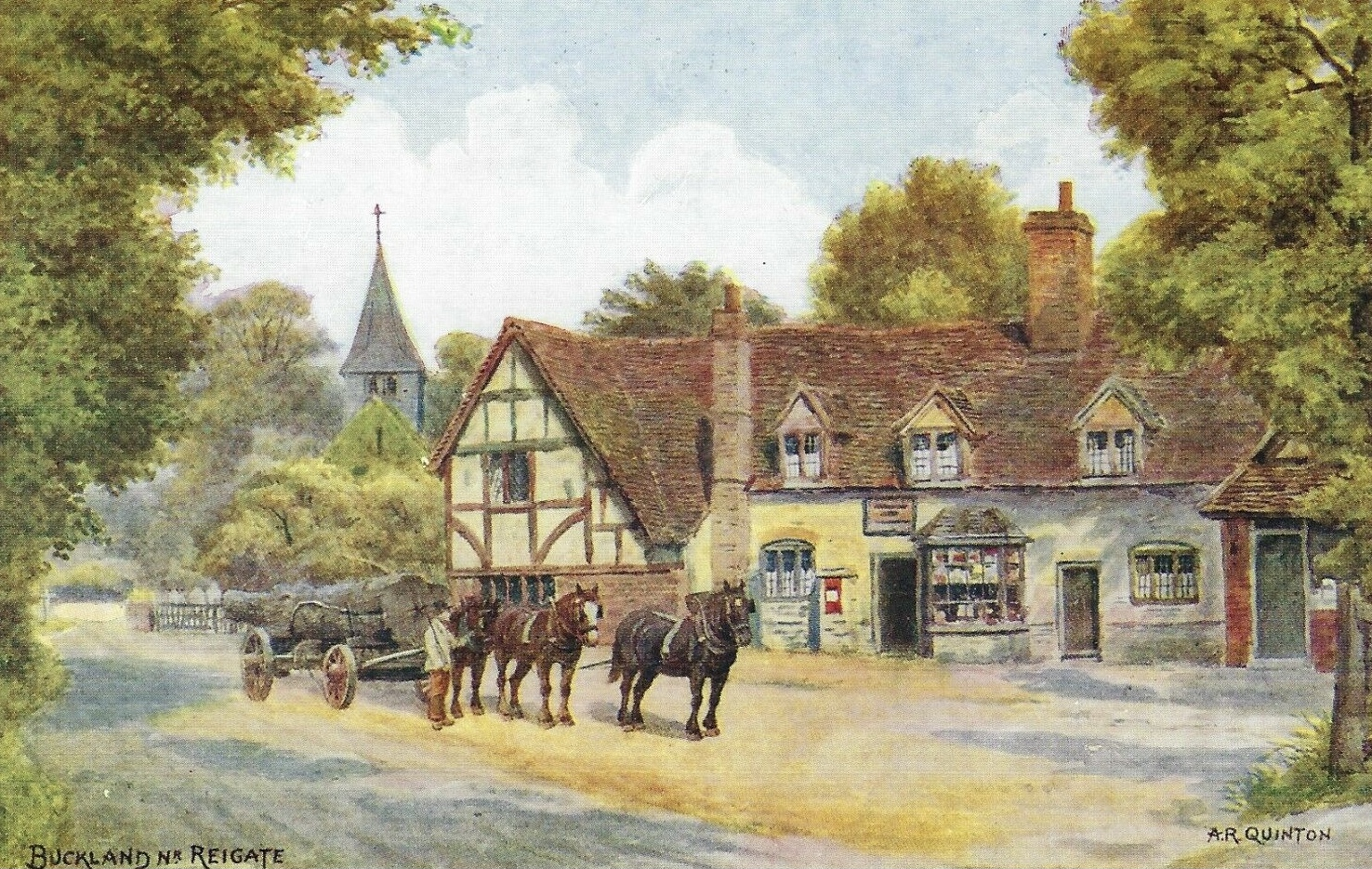
Buckland near Reigate

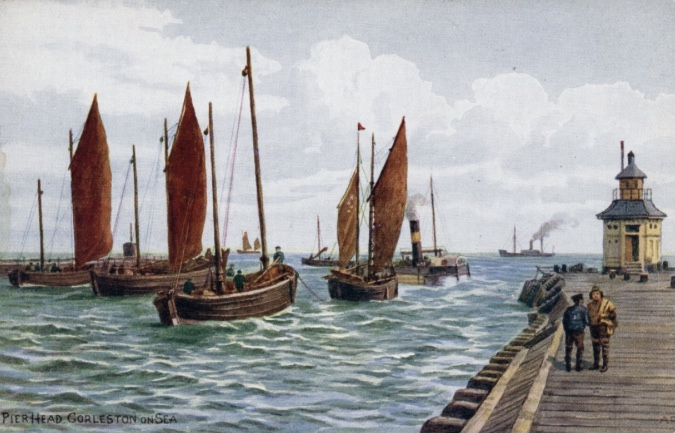
Pier Head, Gorleston-on-Sea

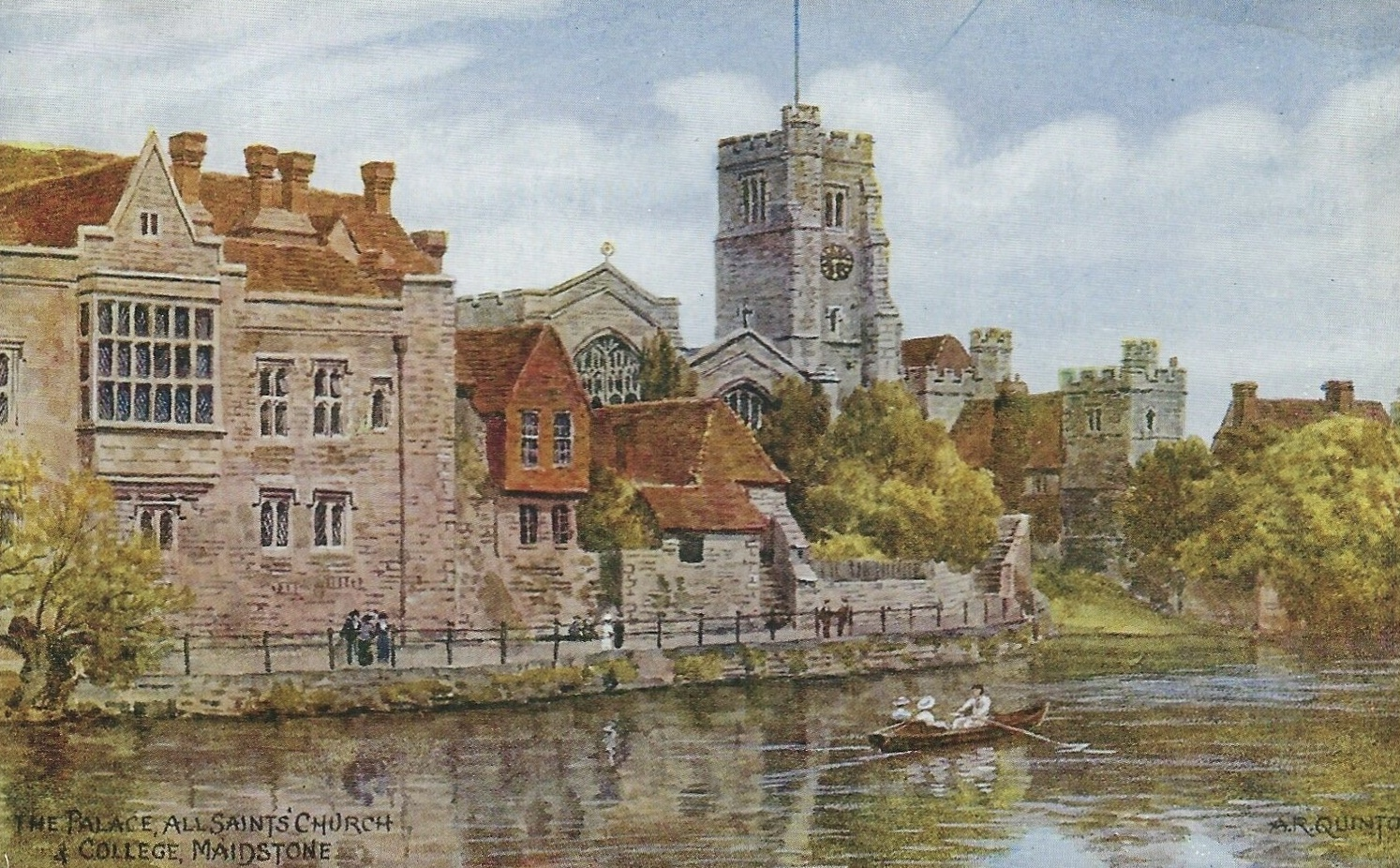
The Palace, All Saints’ Church & College, Maidstone

== Illustrated books ==
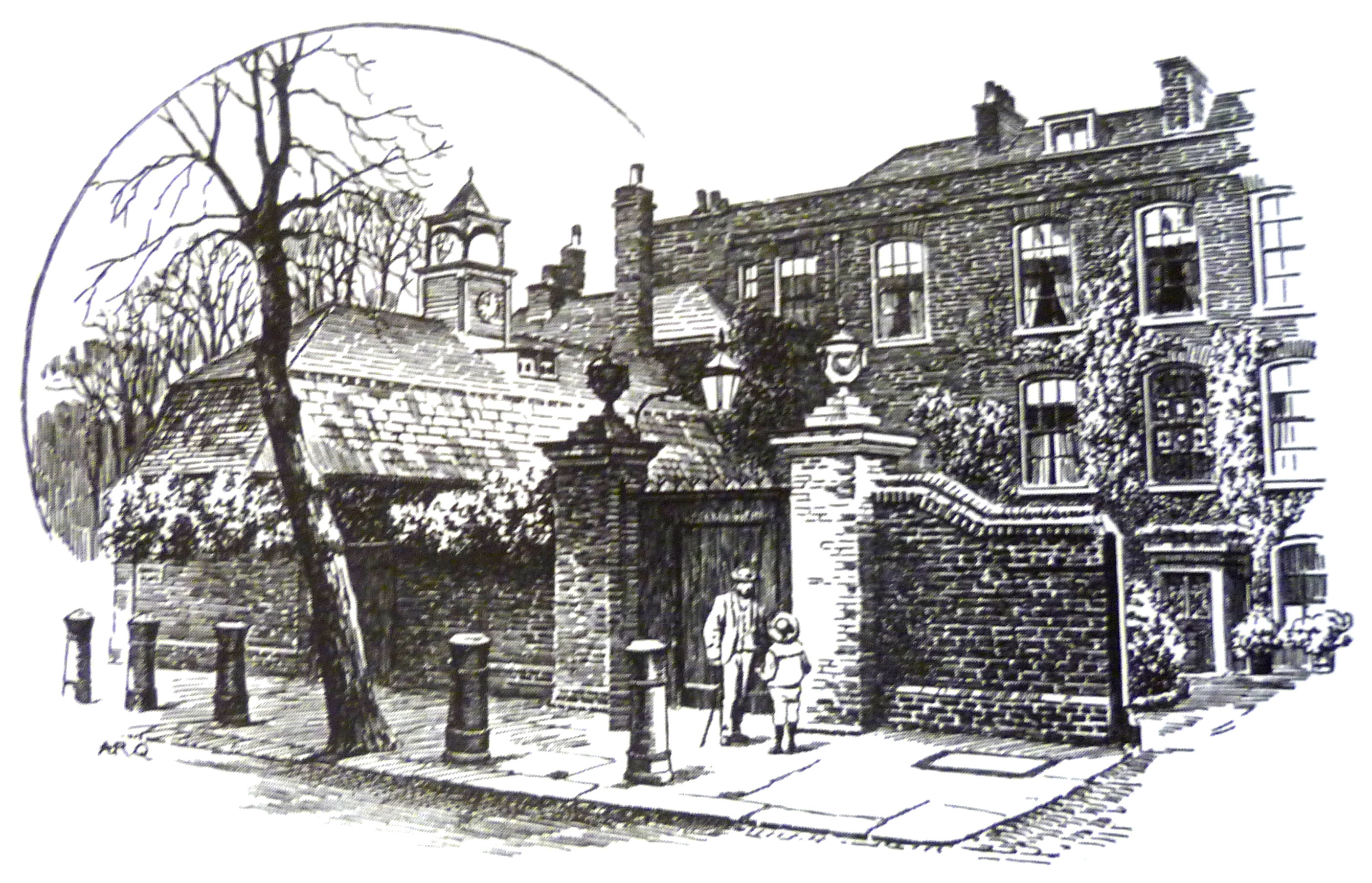
Quinton's drawing of Cannon Hall, Hampstead, 1911

- Belloc, Hilaire. The Historic Thames (J. M. Dent & Co. 1907).
- Bradley, A. G. The Avon and Shakespeare's Country (E. P. Dutton & Co. 1910).
- Ditchfield, P. H. The Cottages and the Village Life of Rural England (J. M. Dent & Sons Ltd, 1912).
- Rhys, Ernest. The Old Country: A book of love & praise of England (J. M. Dent & Sons Ltd, 1922).
