= Guy du Maurier =

British playwright and army officer (1865–1915)

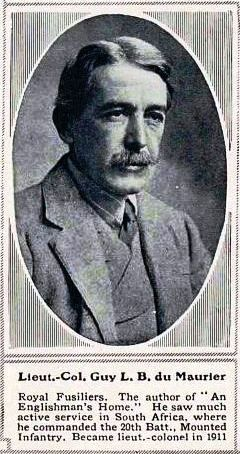
- Born: Guy Louis Busson du Maurier; 18 May 1865; London, England
- Died: 9 March 1915 (aged 49); Kemmel, Flanders, Belgium
- Occupations: army officer, playwright
- Parent(s): George du Maurier; Emma Wightwick
- Relatives: Gerald du Maurier (brother); Daphne du Maurier (niece); Sylvia Llewelyn Davies (sister); George, Jack, Peter, Michael, and Nicholas Llewelyn Davies (nephews); Mary Anne Clarke (great grandmother)

Guy Louis Busson du Maurier DSO (18 May 1865 in London, England – 9 March 1915 in Kemmel, Flanders, Belgium) was an English army officer and playwright. He was the son of the writer George du Maurier, brother of Sylvia Llewelyn Davies and the actor Gerald du Maurier, and uncle of the author Daphne du Maurier.

Busson du Maurier was educated at Marlborough and the Royal Military College, Sandhurst, and was commissioned a lieutenant in the Royal Fusiliers on 7 February 1885. He was promoted to captain on 15 September 1896, and served in the Second Boer War, where he commanded a mounted infantry regiment, earning a promotion to major on 12 December 1900. For his service in the war, he received the Distinguished Service Order (DSO) in the October 1902 South African honours list.

He achieved notoriety in 1909 as the initially anonymous author of the play An Englishman's Home. The play tells the story of the Brown family caught up in the invasion of Britain by a foreign power identified as "Nearland" but widely assumed to represent Germany. When the play was staged in Germany, it caused an outrage, as the German press saw clear references to their homeland. In 1940 it was made into a propaganda film, more pointedly titled "Mad Men of Europe".

At the death of his sister Sylvia, and as requested in her will, he became co-guardian to the Llewelyn Davies boys who inspired Peter Pan.

He was promoted to lieutenant colonel on 29 April 1911 and became commanding officer (CO) of a battalion of the Royal Fusiliers.

He served for the last time in World War I, being killed in action in Flanders in 1915. J. M. Barrie wrote to Guy's nephew George Llewelyn Davies to inform him of the death; by the time Barrie received his response, George himself had been killed.

In 2025, a cache of previously unpublished letters written by Guy du Maurier during the Boer War appeared in print.
