= Peter Pan (character) =

Character created by J. M. Barrie

- Peter Pan character
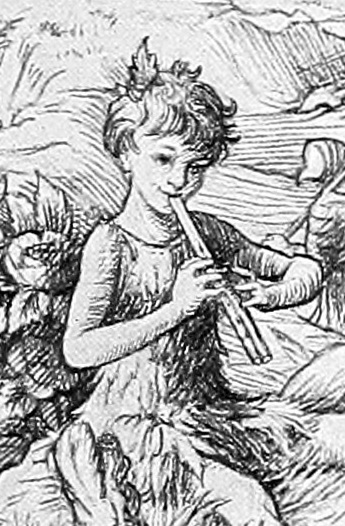
- Illustration of Peter Pan playing the pipes, by F. D. Bedford from Peter and Wendy (1911)
- First appearance: The Little White Bird (1902)
- Created by: J. M. Barrie
- Portrayed by: Nina Boucicault (1904 play); Maude Adams (first US production 1905); Mary Martin (1954 musical); Betty Bronson (1924 film); Sandy Duncan (Broadway play(1979-1981)] Robin Williams (Hook); Jeremy Sumpter (2003 film); Levi Miller (Pan); Allison Williams (Peter Pan Live!); Robbie Kay (Once Upon a Time); Alexander Molony (Peter Pan & Wendy)
- Voiced by: Bobby Driscoll (1953 film); Corey Burton (Back To Neverland); Jason Marsden (Peter Pan and the Pirates); Blayne Weaver (2001–present in Disney media); Christopher Steele (Kingdom Hearts); Adam Wylie (Jake and the Never Land Pirates); Will Arnett (Chip 'n Dale: Rescue Rangers); Lee Slobotkin (Once Upon a Studio)

In-universe information
- Alias: The Boy Who Wouldn't Grow Up
- Species: Human
- Gender: Male
- Nationality: English

Peter Pan is a fictional character created by Scottish novelist and playwright J. M. Barrie. A free-spirited and mischievous young boy who can fly and never grows up, he spends his never-ending childhood having adventures on the mythical island of Neverland as the leader of the Lost Boys, interacting with fairies, pirates, mermaids, Native Americans, and occasionally ordinary children from the world outside Neverland.

Peter Pan has become a cultural icon symbolising youthful innocence and escapism. In addition to two distinct works by Barrie, the novel The Little White Bird (1902), (Note: With chapters 13–18 published in Peter Pan in Kensington Gardens in 1906) and the West End stage play Peter Pan; or, The Boy Who Wouldn't Grow Up (1904), (Note: Expanded into the 1911 novel Peter and Wendy) the character has been featured in a variety of media and merchandise, both adapting and expanding on Barrie's works. These include several films, television series and many other works.

Barrie commissioned a statue of Peter Pan by the sculptor George Frampton, which was erected overnight in Kensington Gardens on 30 April 1912 as a surprise to the children of London. Six other statues have been cast from the original mould and displayed around the world. In 2002, he featured on a series of UK postage stamps issued by the Royal Mail on the centenary of Barrie's creation of the character.

Barrie gave the copyright to the Peter Pan works to Great Ormond Street Children’s Hospital in 1929. Whilst the works are now in the public domain, the hospital maintains the right to collect royalties from adaptations in the United Kingdom thanks to a special amendment to the Copyright, Designs & Patents Act 1988.

== Origin ==
Peter Pan first appeared as a character in Barrie's The Little White Bird (1902), a novel for adults. In chapters 13–18, titled "Peter Pan in Kensington Gardens", Peter is a seven-day-old baby and has flown from his nursery to Kensington Gardens in London, where the fairies and birds taught him to fly. He is described as "betwixt-and-between" a boy and a bird. Barrie returned to the character of Peter Pan, putting him at the centre of his stage play titled Peter Pan, or The Boy Who Wouldn't Grow Up, which premiered on 27 December 1904 at the Duke of York's Theatre in London. Following the success of the 1904 play, Barrie's publishers, Hodder and Stoughton, extracted the Peter Pan chapters of The Little White Bird and published them in 1906 under the title Peter Pan in Kensington Gardens, with the addition of illustrations by Arthur Rackham. Barrie later adapted and expanded the 1904 play's storyline as a novel, which was published in 1911 as Peter and Wendy.

J. M. Barrie may have based the character on his older brother, David, who died in an ice-skating accident the day before his 14th birthday. His mother and brother thought of him as forever a boy. A later inspiration was his friendship with the Llewelyn Davies boys, as described in Barrie's Dedication to the first edition of the play: "I suppose I always knew that I made Peter by rubbing the five of you violently together, as savages with two sticks produced a flame. That is all he is, the spark I got from you."

== Physical appearance ==
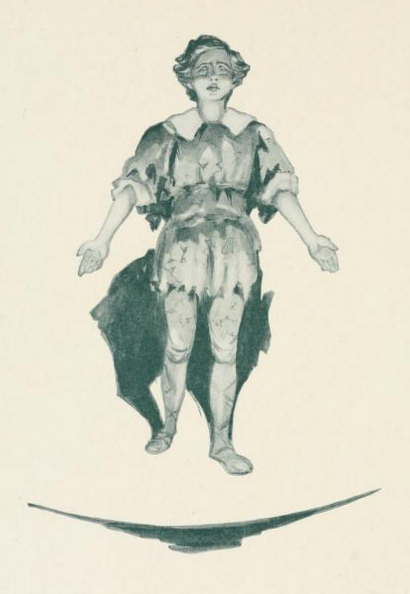
1907 illustration of Peter Pan by Oliver Herford

Barrie never described Peter's appearance in detail, even in his novel, leaving it to the imagination of the reader and the interpretation of anyone adapting the character. In the play, Peter's outfit is made of autumn leaves and cobwebs. In the book and the play, he also carries a dagger for cutting and a sword for fighting, although in some versions he only has one of the two. His name and playing the flute or pan pipes suggest that he is based on the Greek god and mythological character Pan. Barrie mentions in Peter and Wendy that Peter Pan still had all his "first teeth". He describes him as a "lovely boy, clad in skeleton leaves and the juices that ooze out of trees". In The Little White Bird (1902) and Peter Pan in Kensington Gardens (1906), he is seven days old.

Traditionally, the character has been played on stage by a female actor, but can also be played by a male actor. In the original productions in the UK, Peter Pan's costume was a reddish tunic and dark green tights, such as that worn by Nina Boucicault in 1904. This costume is exhibited at Barrie's Birthplace. The similar costume worn by Pauline Chase (who played the role from 1906 to 1913) is displayed in the Museum of London. Early editions of adaptations of the story also depict a red costume but a green costume (whether or not made of leaves) becomes more usual from the 1920s, and more so later after the release of Disney's animated movie.

In the Disney films, Peter wears an outfit that consists of a short-sleeved green tunic and tights apparently made of cloth, and a cap with a red feather in it. He has pointed elf-like ears, brown eyes, and reddish hair.

In Hook (1991), the character is played as an adult by Robin Williams, with blue eyes and dark brown hair; in flashbacks to him in his youth, his hair is light brown. His ears appear pointed only when he is Peter Pan, not as Peter Banning. His Pan attire resembles the Disney outfit (minus the cap) and he wields a gold bladed sword.

In the live-action 2003 Peter Pan film, he is portrayed by Jeremy Sumpter, with blond hair, green eyes, bare feet and a costume made of leaves and vines.

In the prequel to the main story 2015 Pan film, he is portrayed by Levi Miller, a young boy who was left as a baby by the orphanage until he gets captured by Blackbeard's pirates and taken to Neverland. Here, he wears just simple clothes.

== Personality ==
Peter is an exaggerated stereotype of a boastful and careless boy. He claims greatness, even when such claims are questionable (such as congratulating himself when Wendy re-attaches his shadow). In the play and book, Peter symbolises the selfishness of childhood, and is portrayed as being forgetful and self-centred.

Peter has a nonchalant, devil-may-care attitude, and is fearlessly cocky when it comes to putting himself in danger. Barrie writes that when Peter thought he was going to die on Marooners' Rock, he felt scared, yet he felt only one shudder. With this blithe attitude, he says, "To die will be an awfully big adventure." In the play, the unseen and unnamed narrator ponders what might have been if Peter had stayed with Wendy, so that his cry might have become, "To live would be an awfully big adventure!", "but he can never quite get the hang of it".

== Abilities ==
Peter's archetypal quality is his unending youth. In Peter and Wendy, it is explained that Peter must forget his own adventures and what he learns about the world in order to stay childlike.

Peter's ability to fly is explained, but inconsistently. In The Little White Bird, he is able to fly because he is said to be part bird, like all babies. In the play and novel, he teaches the Darling children to fly using a combination of "lovely wonderful thoughts" and fairy dust. In Barrie's Dedication to the play Peter Pan, The Boy Who Wouldn't Grow up, the author attributes the idea of fairy dust being necessary for flight to practical needs:

...after the first production I had to add something to the play at the request of parents (who thus showed that they thought me the responsible person) about no one being able to fly until the fairy dust had been blown on him; so many children having gone home and tried it from their beds and needed surgical attention. – J. M. Barrie

Peter has an effect on the whole of Neverland and its inhabitants when he is there. Barrie states that although Neverland appears different to every child, the island "wakes up" when Peter returns from his trip to London. In the chapter "The Mermaids' Lagoon" in the book Peter and Wendy, Barrie writes that there is almost nothing that Peter cannot do. He is a skilled swordsman, rivalling even Captain Hook, whose hand he cut off in a duel. He has remarkably keen vision and hearing. He is skilled in mimicry, copying the voice of Hook and the ticking of the clock in the crocodile.

Peter has the ability to imagine things into existence and he is able to sense danger when it is near.

In Peter and Wendy, Barrie states that the Peter Pan legend Mrs. Darling heard as a child, was that when children died, he accompanied them part of the way to their destination so they would not be frightened.

In the original play, Peter states that no one must ever touch him (though he does not know why). The stage directions specify that no one does so throughout the play. Wendy approaches Peter to give him a "kiss" (thimble), but is prevented by Tinker Bell. However, John Caird and Trevor Nunn's introduction to the script for the 1997 Royal National Theatre production, states that this was never Barrie's original intention, and was only added for a production in 1927, where Jean Forbes-Robertson took the title role, and played the part with a lighter, more fairy-like, physicality. Robertson was to play the part almost every year until 1939.

== Cultural allusions ==
Peter Pan is a free spirit, being too young to be burdened with the effects of education or to have an adult appreciation of moral responsibility. As a "betwixt-and-between", who can fly and speak the language of fairies and birds, Peter is part animal and part human. According to psychologist Rosalind Ridley, by comparing Peter's behaviour to adults and to other animals, Barrie raises many post-Darwinian questions about the origins of human nature and behaviour. As "the boy who wouldn't grow up", Peter exhibits many aspects of the stages of cognitive development seen in children and can be regarded as Barrie's memory of himself as a child, being both charmingly childlike and childishly solipsistic.

== Relationships ==
=== Family ===
Peter Pan ran away from his parents when he was a baby as told in Peter Pan in Kensington Gardens and Peter and Wendy. Finding the window closed and seeing a new baby boy in the house when he returned some time later, he believed his parents no longer wanted him and never came back. This younger sibling is referred to in the chapter "Lock-Out Time" in Peter Pan in Kensington Gardens but is not mentioned again.

=== Friends ===
==== Maimie Mannering ====
While in Kensington Gardens, Peter meets a lost girl named Maimie Mannering and the two quickly become friends. Peter proposes marriage to Maimie. While Maimie wants to stay in the Gardens with Peter, she comes to realise that her mother is so worried that she must return to her. Maimie promises to always remember Peter and goes back to her mother. When Maimie grows up, she continues to think of Peter, dedicating presents and letters to him. To remember Maimie, Peter rides the imaginary goat that Maimie created for him. She is considered to be the literary predecessor of Wendy Darling.

==== The Darlings ====
===== Wendy Darling =====
It is hinted that Wendy may have romantic feelings for Peter, but unrequited because of his inability to love.

In the original novel, Peter later befriends Wendy's daughter Jane (and her subsequent daughter Margaret), and it is implied that this pattern will go on forever. From time to time, Peter visits the real world, and befriends children. Wendy Darling, whom he recruited to be his "mother", is the most significant of them; he also brings her brothers John and Michael to Neverland at her request. It is mentioned that Wendy was the only girl who captured his attention.

In the 1991 film Hook, an older Wendy implies that she used to (and perhaps, still does) have feelings for Peter, saying that she was shocked that he did not prevent her wedding day. In the 2002 sequel to the 1953 Disney film, Return to Neverland, Peter and a grown-up Wendy are briefly, but happily, reunited after many years; although Wendy has fallen in love and married, and no longer harbours romantic feelings for Peter. In the 2003 film Peter Pan, the feeling is mutual. Captain Hook can only take away Peter's ability to fly by thoughts of Wendy leaving him, growing up, and replacing him with a husband. Wendy saves Peter by giving him her hidden kiss which gives him the will to live, signifying she is his true love. In some versions, he marries her or her granddaughter Moira.

===== John Darling and Michael Darling =====
John is the middle child of the Darlings, and plays father and mother with Wendy. On the Neverland, he serves as the boldest of the Lost Boys and the only one who is not entirely convinced by Peter's games. "'Do be more polite to him,' Wendy whispered to John...'Then tell him to stop showing off,' said John." Michael, the youngest of the Darlings, is the least prepared for the bloodthirsty life on the Neverland. When Michael kills a pirate in Act V, Wendy is mortified because he is so happy about it. Peter Pan In Scarlet reveals that Michael died in World War I.

===== Mary and George Darling =====
The parents of Wendy, John and Michael. Mr. Darling works as a clerk in the City, and is named after George Llewelyn Davies. Mrs. Darling is named after Mary Ansell, Barrie's wife.

==== Neverland inhabitants ====
===== Tiger Lily =====
Tiger Lily is the daughter of Great Big Little Panther, the chief of the Native American tribe that resides in Neverland. Barrie refers to her as "a princess in her own right", and she is often described as such. She is kidnapped by the pirates and left to die on Marooners' Rock but is rescued by Peter. It is hinted later that she may have romantic feelings for Peter but he does not return them, as he is completely oblivious to other people's feelings. In the Disney film, Tiger Lily shows her gratitude by performing a dance for Peter and kissing him. The kiss makes him turn bright red and makes Wendy jealous of Tiger Lily.

===== Tinker Bell =====
Tinker Bell is a common fairy who is Peter Pan's best friend and is often jealously protective of him. He nicknames her "Tink". She is the friend who helps him in his escapades. Tink's malicious actions are usually caused by her jealousy; these lead to the Lost Boys shooting arrows at Wendy, and eventually revealing Peter's hideout to Captain Hook, in the hope that Wendy will be captured rather than Peter. When Tink realises her serious mistake, she risks her own life by drinking the poison Hook has left for Peter. Her extreme loyalty and dedication to Peter are everlasting.

===== The Lost Boys =====
Peter is the leader of the Lost Boys, which include Tootles, Nibs, Slightly, Curly, and The Twins. The Lost Boys is a band of boys who were lost by their parents after they "fall out of their perambulators" and came to live in Neverland. In Barrie's novel Peter and Wendy (but not the original play Peter Pan), it is stated that Peter "thins them out" when they start to grow up.

In the song "I Won't Grow Up" from the 1954 musical, the boys sing "I will stay a boy forever", to which Peter replies "And be banished if I don't".

In Peter Pan in Scarlet (2006), the official sequel to Barrie's Peter and Wendy, what happens to the Lost Boys when they begin to grow up is revealed when Slightly starts to grow older, as Peter banishes him to Nowhereland (which means that he and all his allies will ignore the banished person's existence), the home of all the Long Lost Boys whom Peter has banished in times past.

===== The Crocodile =====
The crocodile is Captain Hook's nemesis. After Peter Pan cut off Captain Hook's hand in a fight and threw it into the sea, the crocodile swallowed it and got a taste for Hook, so it now seeks to consume him whole. It also swallowed a ticking clock, which alerts Hook of its presence.

=== Adversaries ===
==== Captain Hook ====
Captain Hook, whose right hand was cut off in a duel, is Peter Pan's arch-enemy who leads a large group of pirates. Captain Hook's two principal fears are the sight of his own blood (which is supposedly an unnatural colour) and one saltwater crocodile. His name plays on the iron hook that replaced his hand cut off by Peter Pan and eaten by the aforementioned crocodile, which continues to pursue Hook. In the 1991 film Hook Captain Hook kidnaps the children of Peter Banning (the adoptive identity of Peter Pan) when he left Neverland to grow up and married Moira Darling (the granddaughter of Wendy Darling) with whom he would have the two children whom Hook would kidnap: Maggie and Jack. Hook in this film is also shown to question his existence due to the fact Banning/Pan has been away from Neverland so long, to the point that he does not remember anything when he first returns to Neverland. At Smee's suggestion, Hook conjures up a plan to defeat Peter Pan by having his own children turn against him. Although Maggie is never swayed by this plan, Jack initially sides with the pirates due to the prior broken promises of his father. However, upon realising that his father is Peter Pan, Jack has a change of heart and betrays Hook, who is defeated and eaten by a crocodile.

==== Mr. Smee ====
Mr. Smee is Captain Hook's boatswain ("bo'sun") and right-hand man in J. M. Barrie's play Peter Pan and the novel Peter and Wendy. Mr. Smee is Captain Hook's direct confidant. Unlike the other pirates, Smee is often clumsy and incapable of capturing any of the Lost Boys. Rather than engaging in Hook's evil schemes, Smee finds excitement in bagging loot and treasures.

== Original works ==
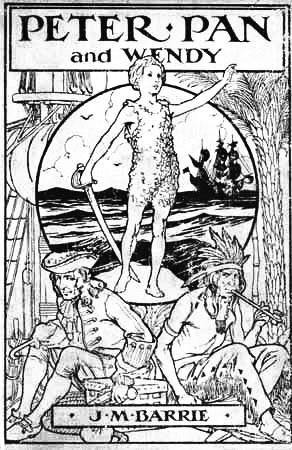
Cover of 1915 edition of J. M. Barrie's novel, first published in 1911, illustrated by F. D. Bedford

- Peter Pan, or The Boy Who Wouldn't Grow Up (1904 play), a play in which Peter brings Wendy and her brothers to Neverland, where he has a showdown with his nemesis, Captain Hook. Barrie adapted this play as a novel; numerous variations and other adaptations have been produced in various media
- Peter Pan in Kensington Gardens (1906), an origin story wherein the infant Peter flies away from his home, takes up residence in Kensington Gardens, and befriends the fairies. It is a "book-within-a-book" that was first published in Barrie's The Little White Bird (1902)
- When Wendy Grew Up – An Afterthought (1908), Barrie's sequel play
- Peter and Wendy (1911), a novel Barrie adapted from the 1904 play, later republished as Peter Pan and Wendy; it also incorporates events of Barrie's sequel play, When Wendy Grew Up – An Afterthought (1908)

== Popular culture ==
=== Motion pictures and television ===
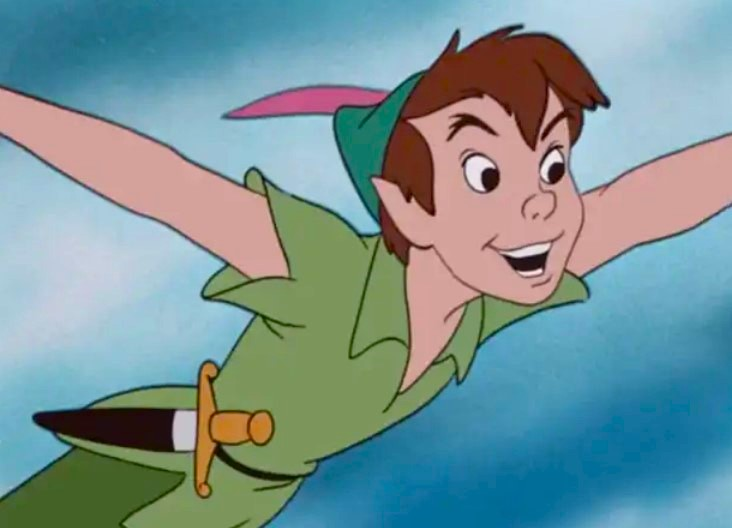
Peter Pan, as he appears in Walt Disney's film adaptation (1953)

- Peter Pan appeared for the first time on screen in the 1924 American silent adventure film Peter Pan released by Paramount Pictures as an adaptation of the original stage play.
- Since their 1953 animated film, Disney has continued to use Peter Pan as a character, as in the sequel film Return to Never Land (voiced by Blayne Weaver), and in the Disney Parks, both as a meetable character alternating between Fantasyland and Adventureland and as the protagonist of the dark ride Peter Pan's Flight. He also appears in the television series House of Mouse and its film Mickey's Magical Christmas, several Disney video games including the Kingdom Hearts series (voiced by Mitsuo Iwata, and later by Yū Hayashi), and the television series based on Peter Pan, Jake and the Never Land Pirates (voiced by Adam Wylie). An older and darker interpretation of this Peter Pan appears as an antagonist in Chip 'n Dale: Rescue Rangers, voiced by Will Arnett. Peter Pan also appears in the short film Once Upon a Studio, voiced primarily by Lee Slobotkin, with archival recordings of Bobby Driscoll also being used.

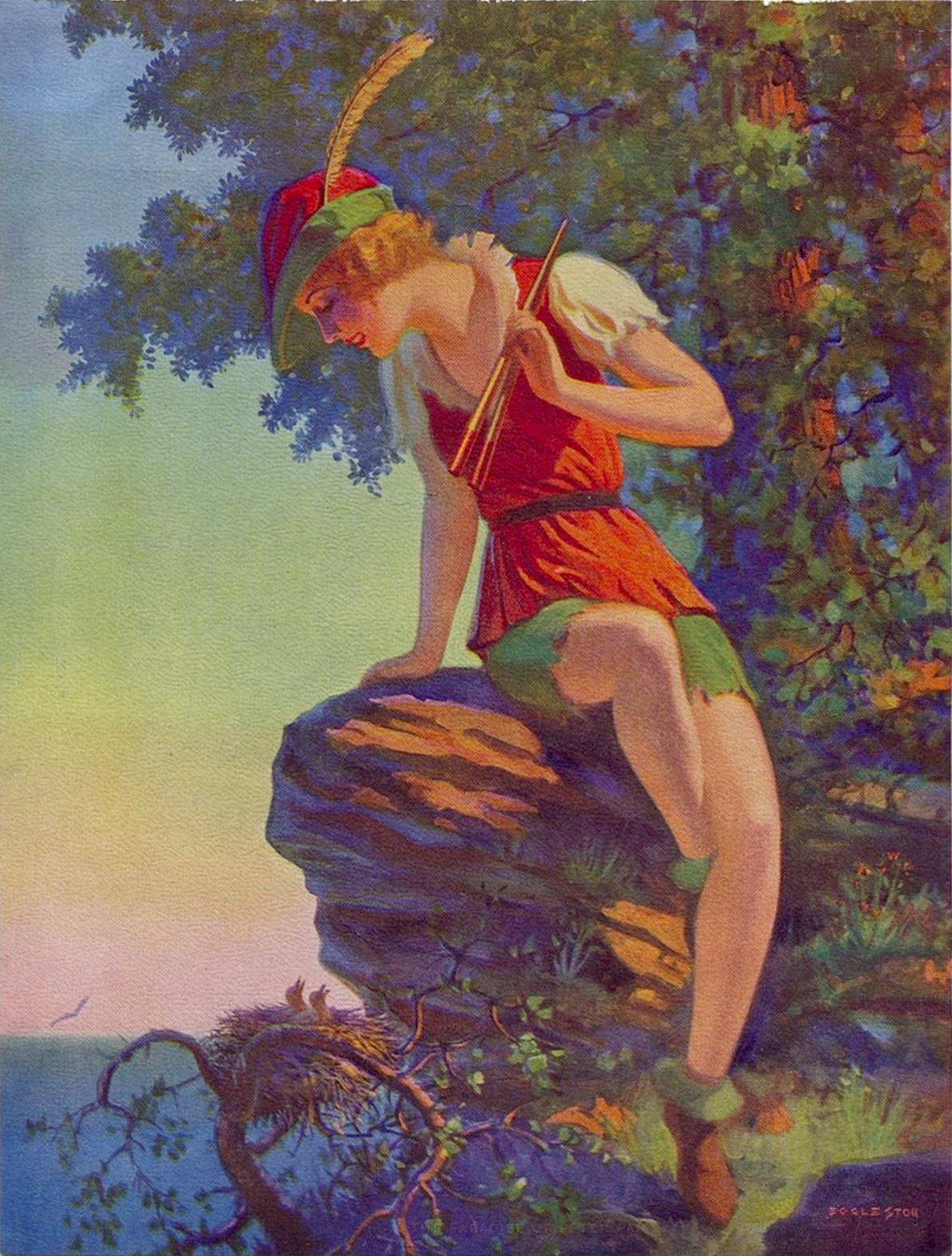
The Paradise of Peter Pan by Edward Mason Eggleston, 1934

- Peter Pan appears in Fox's Peter Pan & the Pirates, voiced by Jason Marsden.
- In 1991, Robin Williams portrayed Peter Pan in the live-action film Hook, directed by Steven Spielberg, also starring Dustin Hoffman as Captain Hook and Julia Roberts as Tinker Bell.
- In 2003, Jeremy Sumpter portrayed Peter in the live-action film directed by P. J. Hogan.
- Peter Pan appears in The New Adventures of Peter Pan, voiced by Matt Hill and Jake Paque.
- In 2013, Robbie Kay portrayed Peter Pan in the third season of the ABC drama series Once Upon a Time, which depicts the character and his shadow as villains.
- In 2015, Levi Miller portrayed Peter Pan in Pan, a live action origin film.
- In 2015, Peter and Wendy aired on ITV, produced by Headline Pictures, with Zac Sutcliffe portraying Peter.
- In 2023, Disney released Peter Pan & Wendy, a live-action reimagining of the 1953 Disney animated film, with Peter Pan being portrayed by Alexander Molony.
- In 2025, Peter Pan appeared in Peter Pan's Neverland Nightmare as the main antagonist, portrayed by Martin Portlock. Peter Pan is similar to the Grabber from The Black Phone, as a masked killer who goes after children (with the director listing the movie as one of the biggest inspirations). Pan is set to return in the crossover film Poohniverse: Monsters Assemble as one of the film’s three most villainous characters, alongside Mary Poppins and the Mad Hatter.

=== Manga/anime, games, and comics ===
- In the early 1930s, Edward Mason Eggleston painted a series of images for calendars that included Peter Pan, Native American princesses and pirates
- J. R. R. Tolkien's biographer Humphrey Carpenter has speculated that Tolkien's impressions of a 1910 production of Barrie's Peter Pan in Birmingham "may have had a little to do with" his original conception of the Elves of Middle Earth
- He appears in the Italian comic series Martin Mystère
- Japanese manga artist Mayu Sakai appropriated the English term for her series Peter Pan Syndrome
- Game author Diana Gaeta developed a Dungeons & Dragons campaign setting named Neverland - The Impossible Island that allows players to interact with Peter Pan in an environment based on Peter and Wendy by J. M. Barrie
- Fiction writer Jonathan Green published a role-playing gamebook titled Neverland: Here Be Monsters! in which Peter Pan appears as a playable character. This version's background story attributes his flight ability and eternal youth to cybernetic implants installed by his genius father after Peter was severely injured by one of the dinosaurs roaming Neverland.
- Peter Pan appears in Disney Villains' Revenge, voiced primarily by Michael Welch and by Kevin Schon as an adult.

=== Music ===
- Italian singer-songwriter Enrico Ruggeri recorded the concept album Peter Pan in 1991 with a single of the same name. Later, he produced an experimental punk/rock musical inspired by Neverland with his group Decibel.
- Italian writer Giorgio Faletti wrote the song "L'isola che c'è" inspired by Neverland and dedicated to Elba Island.
- Canadian singer-songwriter Ruth B. released the piano ballad "Lost Boy" in 2015, featuring Peter Pan and Neverland, and inspired by the character's appearance in Once Upon a Time.
- Italian songwriter Edoardo Bennato released the concept album Sono solo canzonette in 1980 based on Peter Pan and other characters created by Barrie. He then created a musical named Peter Pan using his songs.
- Norwegian-Swedish singer Anni-Frid Lyngstad recorded the song "Peter Pan" by Benny Andersson and Björn Ulvaeus in 1969.
- The Jonas Brothers' song "Fly With Me" references Peter Pan and Wendy in the lyrics.
- Singer-songwriter Kelsea Ballerini released the top-charting country single "Peter Pan" in 2016.
- South Korean boy-band BTS's song "Adult Child" references Peter Pan's tale.
- British musician Kate Bush included the song "In Search of Peter Pan" on her second album Lionheart. (1978). Another song on the same album, "Oh England My Lionheart", references Peter Pan in the lyrics.
- South Korean boy-band Exo released the song "Peter Pan" on the Mandarin and Korean versions of the album XOXO (2013).
- Serbian and Yugoslav rock band Petar Pan was named after the character.
- The eleventh track of singer-songwriter Troye Sivan's debut studio album Blue Neighbourhood (2015) is titled "Lost Boy", inspired by Peter Pan.
- Chance The Rapper released the song "Same Drugs", featured on the album Coloring Book (2015), which references Peter Pan and Wendy.
- Taylor Swift's songs "Cardigan" and "Peter" include references to Peter Pan.
- Blues/psychedelic rock band Kula Shaker released the song "Peter Pan RIP", featured on their fourth album Pilgrims Progress.
- Italian singer-songwriter Ultimo named his second album Peter Pan (2018). It contains the song "Peter Pan (Vuoi Volare Con Me?)", meaning "Peter Pan (Will You Fly with Me?)".
- Finnish symphonic metal band Nightwish references Peter Pan in some of their songs, such as "Fantasmic" from their 2000 album Wishmaster and "Storytime" from their 2011 album Imaginaerum.
- South Korean girl-group (G)I-dle released the song "Peter Pan", featured on their sixth extended play I Feel (2023).
- British singer Maisie Peters released the song "Wendy", featured on her 2023 album The Good Witch, which references Wendy and Peter's relationship.

=== Other uses in popular culture ===
The name Peter Pan has been adopted for various purposes over the years:

- Several businesses have adopted the name, including Peter Pan Bus Lines, Peter Pan peanut butter, Peter Pan Records, and Peter Pan Seafoods
- Three Thoroughbred racehorses have been given the name, the first, Peter Pan I, was born in 1904
- In the early 1960s, some Cuban families sent their children to resettle in Miami in an emergency effort calculated to save the children from potential mistreatment under the Castro socialist regime; the program was called Operation Peter Pan (or Operación Pedro Pan)
- American psychologist Dr. Dan Kiley popularised the Peter Pan syndrome (puer aeternus) in his book The Peter Pan Syndrome: Men Who Have Never Grown Up (1983). He described individuals (usually male) with underdeveloped maturity. His next book, The Wendy Dilemma (1984), advises women romantically involved with "Peter Pans" how to improve their relationships

== Public sculptures ==
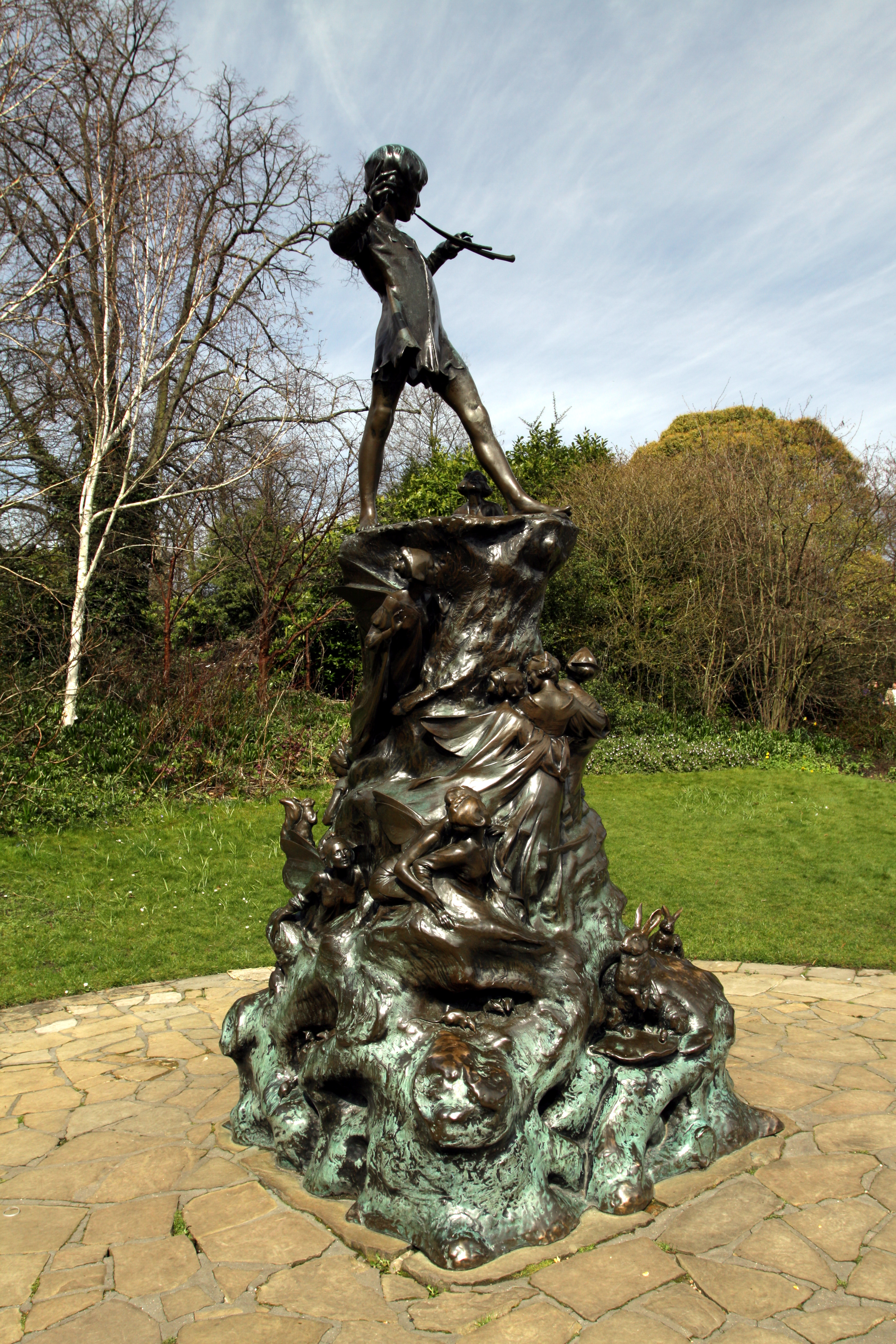
Peter Pan statue in Kensington Gardens, London, England, 1912, by George Frampton

Barrie commissioned a statue of Peter Pan by the sculptor George Frampton, which was erected overnight in Kensington Gardens on 30 April 1912 as a May Day surprise to the children of London. Seven statues have been cast from the original mould. The other six are located in:

- Egmont Park, Brussels, Belgium, 1924
- Bowring Park, St. John's, Newfoundland, Canada, 1925
- Johnson Park on the campus of Rutgers University, Camden, New Jersey, United States, 1926
- Queens Gardens, Perth, Western Australia, 1927
- Sefton Park, Liverpool, England, 1928
- Glenn Gould Park, Toronto, Ontario, Canada, 1929

Other statues are:

- In 1925, the town council of Melbourne, Australia, commissioned a statue of Peter Pan by Paul Montfort; it is now located in Melbourne Zoo
- In 1928, Charles Andrew Hafner created a bronze statue for a fountain in the lobby of the old Paramount Theater in Times Square, but it is now situated in Carl Schurz Park, New York
- In 1949, a statue of Peter Pan by Alex Proudfoot RSA, Principal of Glasgow School of Art, was erected at the Mearnskirk Hospital for children in Glasgow, commissioned by Alfred Ellsworth in memory of his friend Dr John A Wilson, first superintendent of Mearnskirk Hospital. Wilson had also been a school friend of J.M. Barrie's
- A statue by Ivan Mitford-Barberton was commissioned by Vyvyan and Gwen Watson in remembrance of their son Peter and given in 1959 to the Red Cross War Memorial Children's Hospital in Western Cape, South Africa
- A pair of statues by Cecil Thomas, one showing Peter Pan and Tinker Bell, and the other Wendy and the Darling children, have been located in Dunedin Botanic Gardens in Dunedin, New Zealand since the 1960s. A slightly different version of the Peter Pan statue, also by Thomas, can be found close to Rotokawau Virginia Lake in Whanganui, New Zealand
- A bronze statue by Alistair Smart, originally commissioned by the Angus Milling Company in 1972, is situated in the main square of Kirriemuir, Scotland.
- In 1976, Ronald Thomason sculpted a bronze statue in front of the Weatherford, Texas public library honouring Weatherford native Mary Martin, who had portrayed Peter Pan in the 1954 Broadway musical production and several subsequent telecasts
- A bronze statue by Diarmuid Byron O'Connor was commissioned by Great Ormond Street Hospital in London and unveiled in 2000, showing Peter blowing fairy dust, with Tinker Bell added in 2005
Statues of Peter Pan

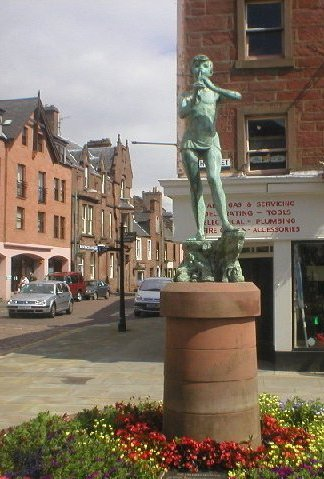
Statue in Kirriemuir, Scotland

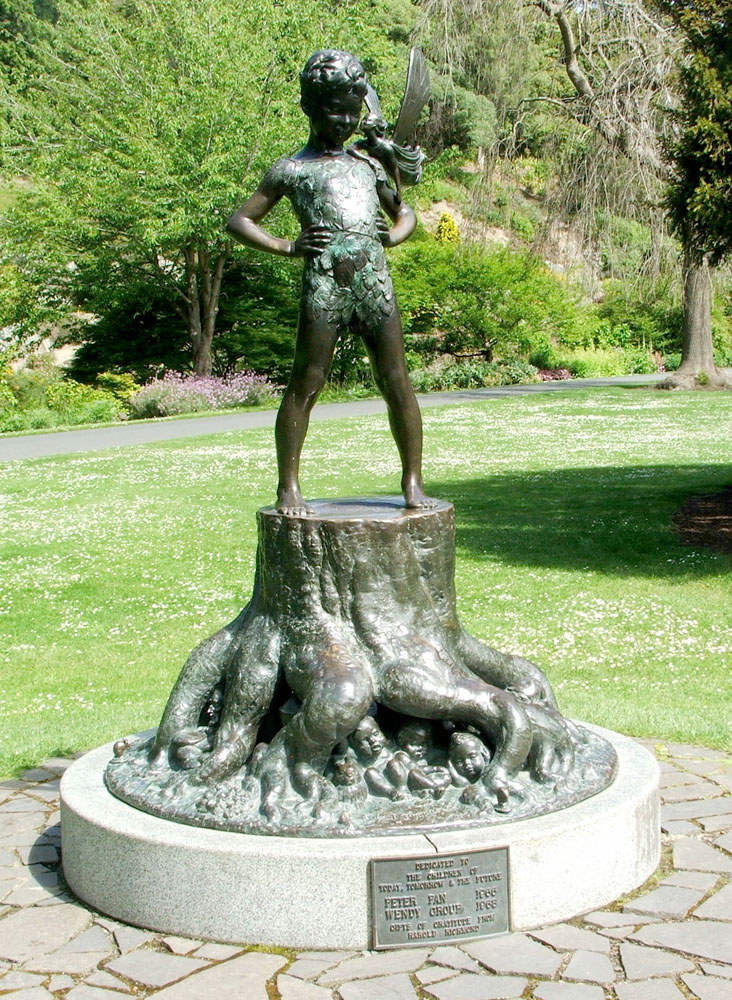
Statue in Dunedin, New Zealand

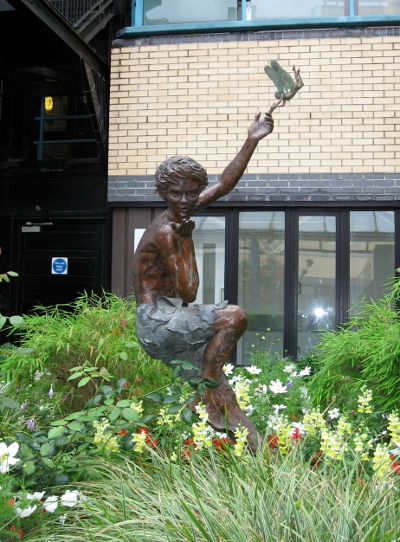
Peter Pan statue at Great Ormond Street Hospital, London

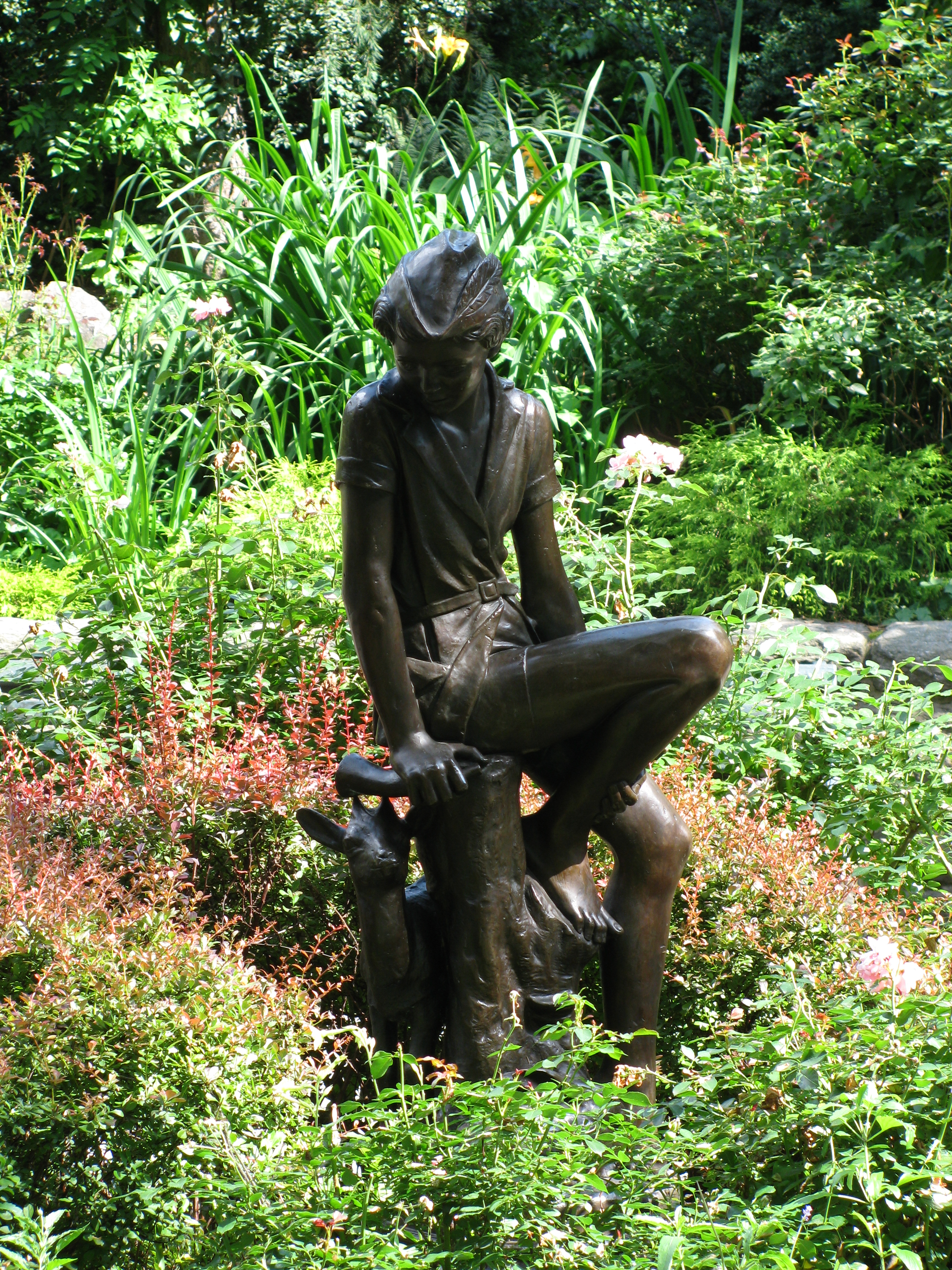
Peter Pan statue at Carl Schurz Park, New York, NYC

== See also ==
- Peter Pan syndrome
- George Llewelyn Davies
