= J. M. Barrie =

Scottish novelist and playwright (1860–1937)

Sir J. M. Barrie Bt OM
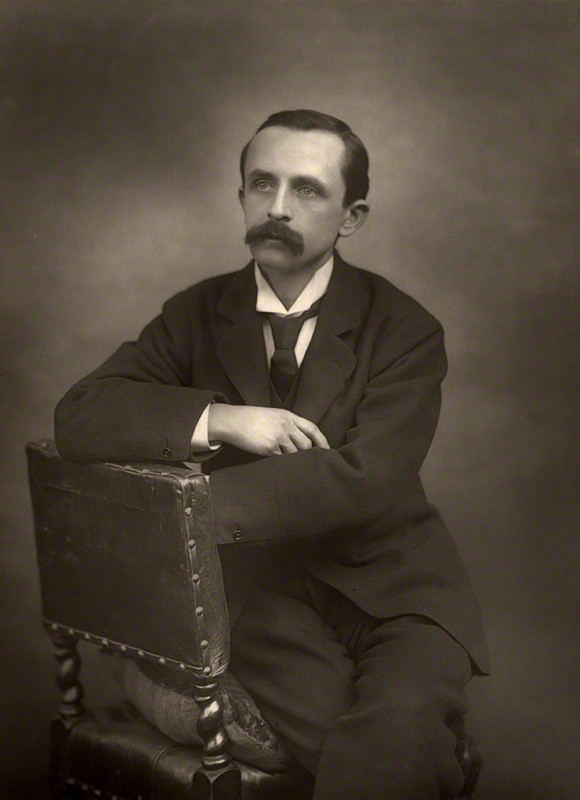
- Portrait by Herbert Rose Barraud, 1892
- Born: James Matthew Barrie; 9 May 1860; Kirriemuir, Angus, Scotland
- Died: 19 June 1937 (aged 77); London, England
- Resting place: Kirriemuir Cemetery, Angus
- Education: Glasgow Academy; Forfar Academy; Dumfries Academy; University of Edinburgh
- Occupations: Novelist; playwright
- Spouse: Mary Ansell (m. 1894; div. 1909)
- Children: Guardian of the Llewelyn Davies boys
- Writing career
- Period: Victorian; Edwardian
- Genres: Children's literature; drama; fantasy
- Notable works: The Little White Bird; Peter Pan; The Admirable Crichton
- Website: jmbarrie.co.uk

Sir James Matthew Barrie, 1st Baronet (/ˈbæri/; 9 May 1860 – 19 June 1937) was a Scottish novelist and playwright. He was born and educated in Scotland and then moved to London, where he wrote several successful novels and plays. There he met the Llewelyn Davies boys, who inspired him to write about a baby boy who has magical adventures in Kensington Gardens (first included in Barrie's 1902 adult novel The Little White Bird), then to write Peter Pan, or The Boy Who Wouldn't Grow Up, a 1904 West End "fairy play" about an ageless boy and an ordinary girl named Wendy who have adventures in the fantasy setting of Neverland.

Although he continued to write successfully, Peter Pan overshadowed his other work, and is credited with popularising the name Wendy. Barrie unofficially adopted the Davies boys following the deaths of their parents. Barrie was made a baronet by George V on 14 June 1913, and a member of the Order of Merit in the 1922 New Year Honours. Before his death, he gave the rights to the Peter Pan works to Great Ormond Street Hospital for Children in London, which continues to benefit from them.

== Childhood and adolescence ==
James Matthew Barrie was born on 9 May 1860 in Kirriemuir, Angus, Scotland. His father, David Barrie, was a modestly successful weaver. His mother, Margaret Ogilvy, assumed her deceased mother's household responsibilities at the age of eight. Barrie was the ninth child of ten (two of whom died before he was born), all of whom were schooled in at least the three Rs in preparation for possible professional careers. He was a small child and drew attention to himself with storytelling. He grew to only 5 ft 3 1/2 in. (161 cm) according to his 1934 passport.

When James Barrie was six years old, his elder brother David (their mother's favourite) died in an ice-skating accident on the day before his 14th birthday. This left his mother devastated, and James tried to fill David's place in his mother's attentions, even wearing David's clothes and whistling in the manner that he did. On one occasion, James entered her room and heard her say, "Is that you?" "I thought it was the dead boy she was speaking to", wrote Barrie in his biographical account of his mother Margaret Ogilvy (1896) "and I said in a little lonely voice, 'No, it's no' him, it's just me.'" Barrie's mother found comfort in the fact that her dead son would remain a boy forever, never to grow up and leave her. Eventually, Barrie and his mother entertained each other with stories of her brief childhood and books such as Robinson Crusoe by Daniel Defoe, works by fellow Scotsman Walter Scott, and The Pilgrim's Progress.

At the age of eight, Barrie was sent to the Glasgow Academy in the care of his eldest siblings, Alexander and Mary Ann, who taught at the school. When he was 10, he returned home and continued his education at the Forfar Academy. At 14, he left home for Dumfries Academy, again under the watch of Alexander and Mary Ann. He became a voracious reader and was fond of penny dreadfuls and the works of Robert Michael Ballantyne and James Fenimore Cooper. At Dumfries, he and his friends spent time in the garden of Moat Brae house, playing pirates "in a sort of Odyssey that was long afterwards to become the play of Peter Pan". They formed a drama club, producing his first play Bandelero the Bandit, which provoked a minor controversy following a scathing moral denunciation from a clergyman on the school's governing board.

== Literary career ==
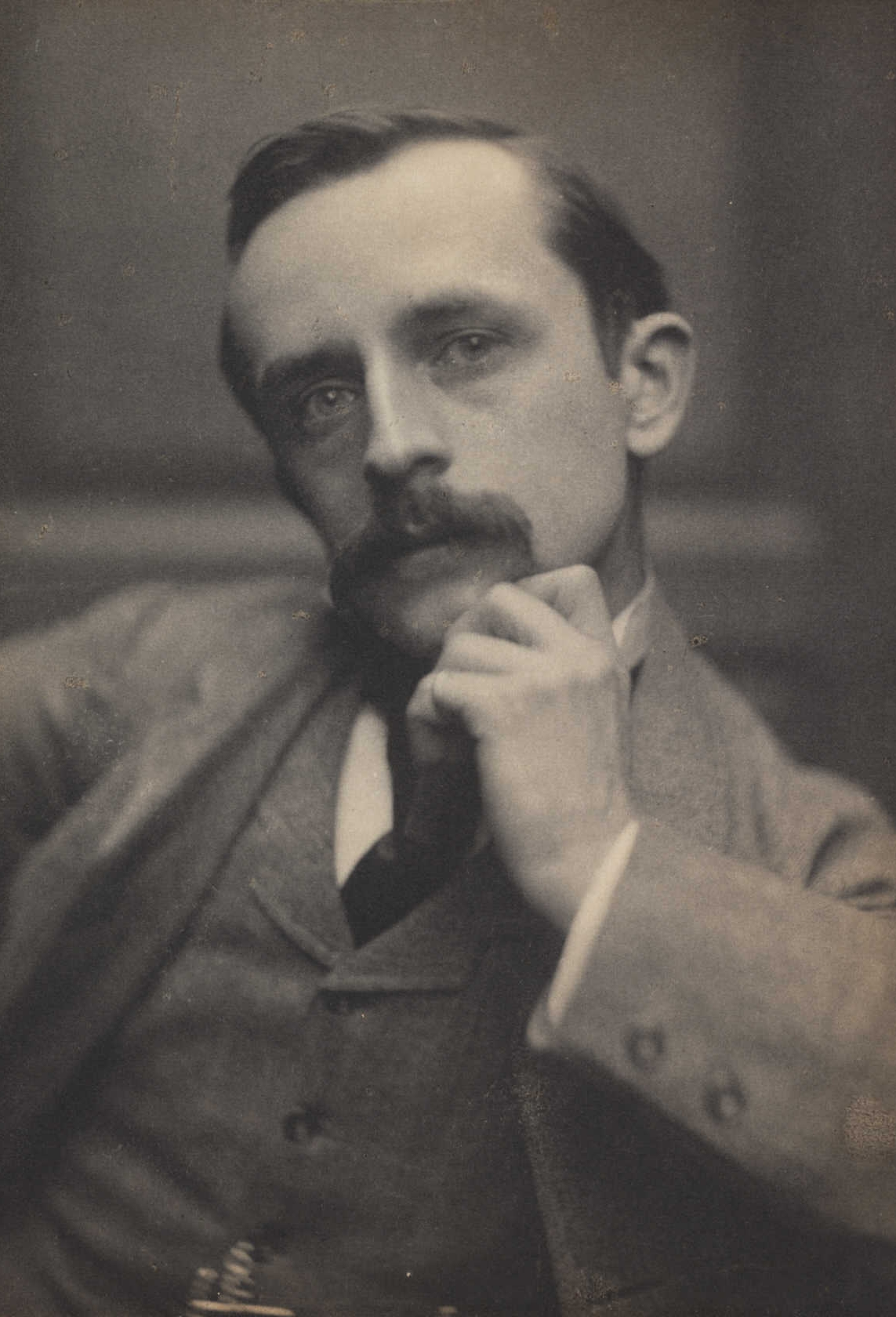
Barrie in 1892

Barrie knew that he wished to follow a career as an author; however, his family attempted to persuade him to choose a profession such as the ministry. With advice from Alexander, he was able to work out a compromise of attending a university, but studying literature. Barrie enrolled at the University of Edinburgh where he wrote drama reviews for the Edinburgh Evening Courant. He graduated and obtained an M.A. on 21 April 1882.

Following a job advertisement found by his sister in The Scotsman, he worked for a year and a half as a staff journalist on the Nottingham Journal some way south into the East Midlands of England. Back in Kirriemuir after this, he submitted a piece to the St. James's Gazette, a London newspaper, using his mother's stories about the town where she grew up (renamed "Thrums"). The editor "liked that Scotch thing" so well that Barrie ended up writing a series of these stories. They served as the basis for his first novels: Auld Licht Idylls (1888), A Window in Thrums (1889), and The Little Minister (1891).

The stories depicted the "Auld Lichts", a strict religious sect to which his grandfather had once belonged. Modern literary criticism of these early works has been unfavourable, tending to disparage them as sentimental and nostalgic depictions of a parochial Scotland, far from the realities of the industrialised 19th century, seen as characteristic of what became known as the Kailyard School. Despite, or perhaps because of, this, they were popular enough at the time to establish Barrie as a successful writer. Following that success, he published Better Dead (1888) privately and at his own expense, but it failed to sell. His two "Tommy" novels, Sentimental Tommy (1896) and Tommy and Grizel (1900), were about a boy and young man who clings to childish fantasy, with an unhappy ending. The English novelist George Gissing read the former in November 1896 and wrote that he "thoroughly dislike[d it]".

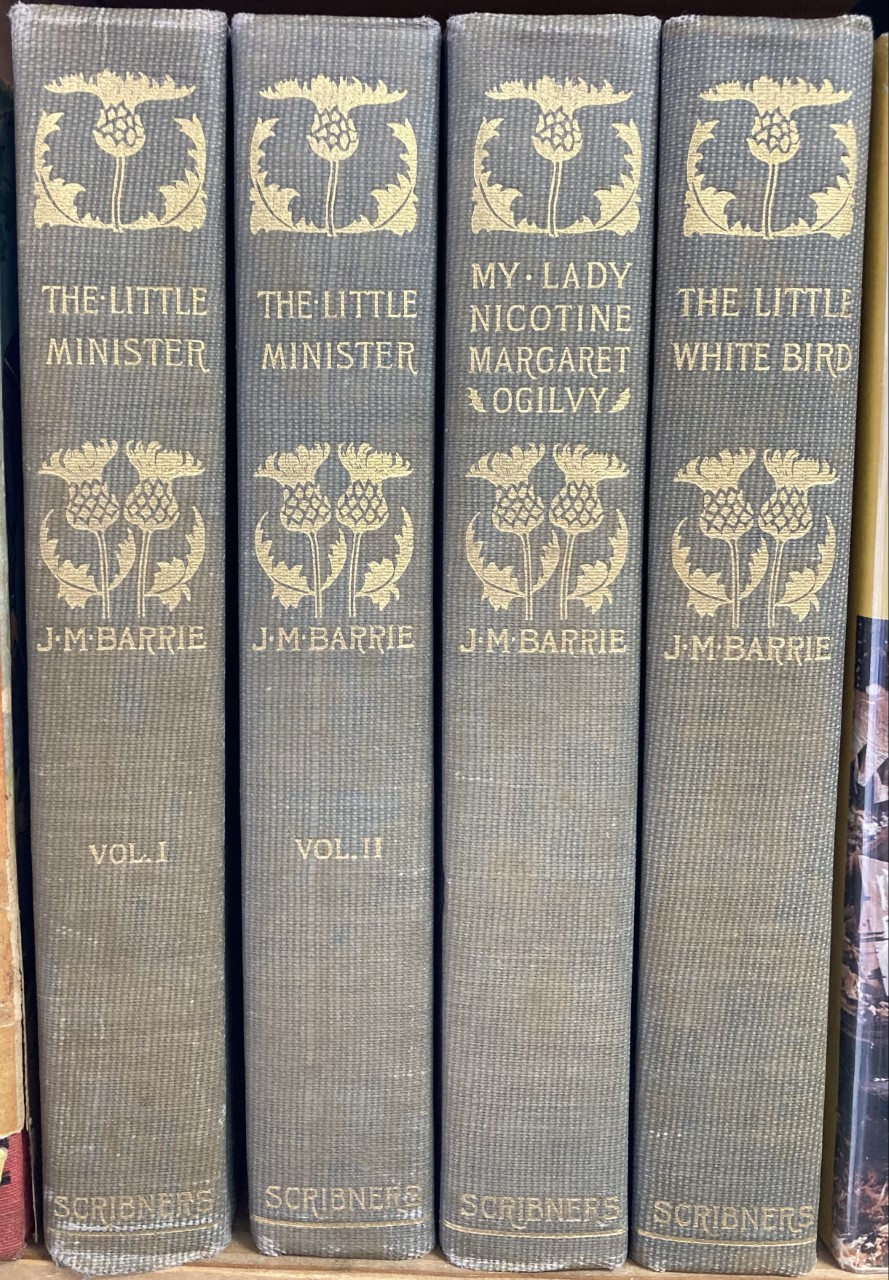
Some of Barrie's novels

Meanwhile, Barrie's attention turned increasingly to works for the theatre, beginning with a biography of Richard Savage, written by Barrie and H. B. Marriott Watson; it was performed only once and critically panned. He immediately followed this with Ibsen's Ghost, or Toole Up-to-Date (1891), a parody of Henrik Ibsen's dramas Hedda Gabler and Ghosts. Ghosts had been unlicensed in the UK until 1914, but had created a sensation at the time from a single "club" performance.

The production of Ibsen's Ghost at Toole's Theatre in London was seen by William Archer, the translator of Ibsen's works into English. Apparently comfortable with the parody, he enjoyed the humour of the play and recommended it to others. Barrie's third play Walker, London (1892) resulted in his being introduced to a young actress named Mary Ansell. He proposed to her and they were married on 9 July 1894. Barrie bought her a Saint Bernard puppy, Porthos, who played a part in the 1902 novel The Little White Bird. He used Ansell's first name for many characters in his novels. Barrie also authored Jane Annie, a comic opera for Richard D'Oyly Carte (1893), which failed; he persuaded Arthur Conan Doyle to revise and finish it for him.

In 1901 and 1902, he had back-to-back successes; Quality Street was about a respectable, responsible old maid who poses as her own flirtatious niece to try to win the attention of a former suitor returned from the war. The Admirable Crichton was a critically acclaimed social commentary with elaborate staging about an aristocratic family and their household servants whose social order is inverted after they are shipwrecked on a desert island. Max Beerbohm thought it "quite the best thing that has happened, in my time, to the British theatre".

=== Peter Pan ===
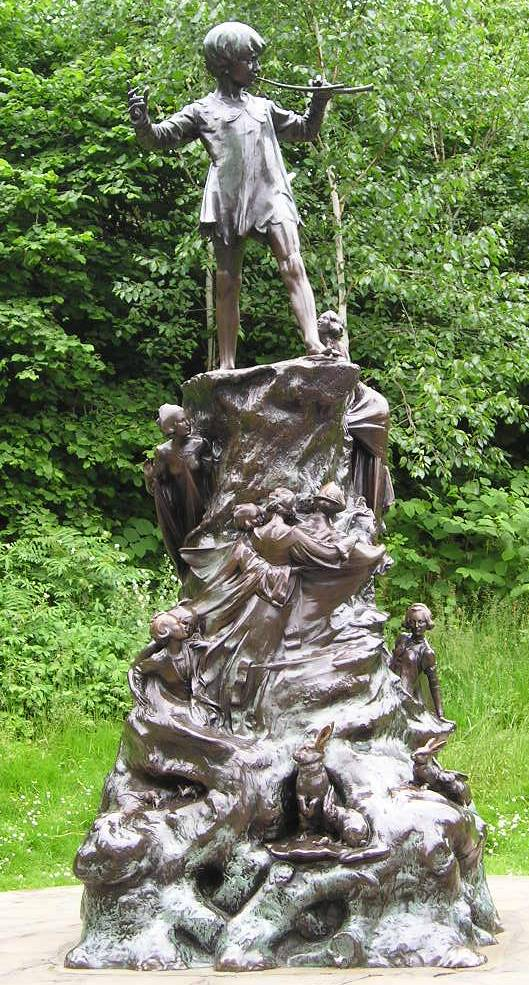
Peter Pan statue (1912) by Sir George Frampton in Kensington Gardens, London

The character of "Peter Pan" first appeared in The Little White Bird. The novel was published in the UK by Hodder & Stoughton in 1902 and serialised in the US in the same year in Scribner's Magazine. Barrie's more famous and enduring work Peter Pan, or The Boy Who Wouldn't Grow Up had its first stage performance on 27 December 1904 at the West End’s Duke of York's Theatre. The tradition of having a woman play the title role started because at the time children were not allowed to act on stage, and smaller women were considered more believable in the role of a young boy. This play introduced audiences to the name "Wendy"; it was inspired by a young girl named Margaret Henley who called Barrie "Friendy", but could not pronounce her Rs very well. The Bloomsbury scenes show the societal constraints of late Victorian and Edwardian middle class domestic reality, contrasted with Neverland, a world where morality is ambivalent.

George Bernard Shaw described the play as "ostensibly a holiday entertainment for children but really a play for grown-up people", suggesting deeper social metaphors at work in Peter Pan. In 1907, it was parodied by H. G. Pélissier and The Follies at the Apollo Theatre on Shaftesbury Avenue in a sketch entitled Baffles or the Peterpan-tomime. This parody was in fact reviewed by Barrie himself in a magazine called Sphere as being "funny in little bits", although he also concluded that The Follies were "one of the funniest things now to be seen in London."

Barrie had a long string of successes on the stage after Peter Pan, many of which discuss social concerns, as Barrie continued to integrate his work and his beliefs. The Twelve Pound Look (1910) concerns a wife leaving her 'typical' husband once she can gain an independent income. Other plays, such as Mary Rose (1920) and Dear Brutus (1917), revisit the idea of the ageless child and parallel worlds. Barrie was involved in the 1909 and 1911 attempts to challenge the censorship of the theatre by the Lord Chamberlain, along with a number of other playwrights.

In 1911, Barrie developed the Peter Pan play into the novel Peter and Wendy. In April 1929, Barrie gave the copyright of the Peter Pan works to Great Ormond Street Hospital, a leading children's hospital in London. The current status of the copyright is somewhat complex. His final play was The Boy David (1936), which dramatised the Biblical story of King Saul and the young David. Like the role of Peter Pan, that of David was played by a woman, Elisabeth Bergner, for whom Barrie wrote the play.

== Social connections ==
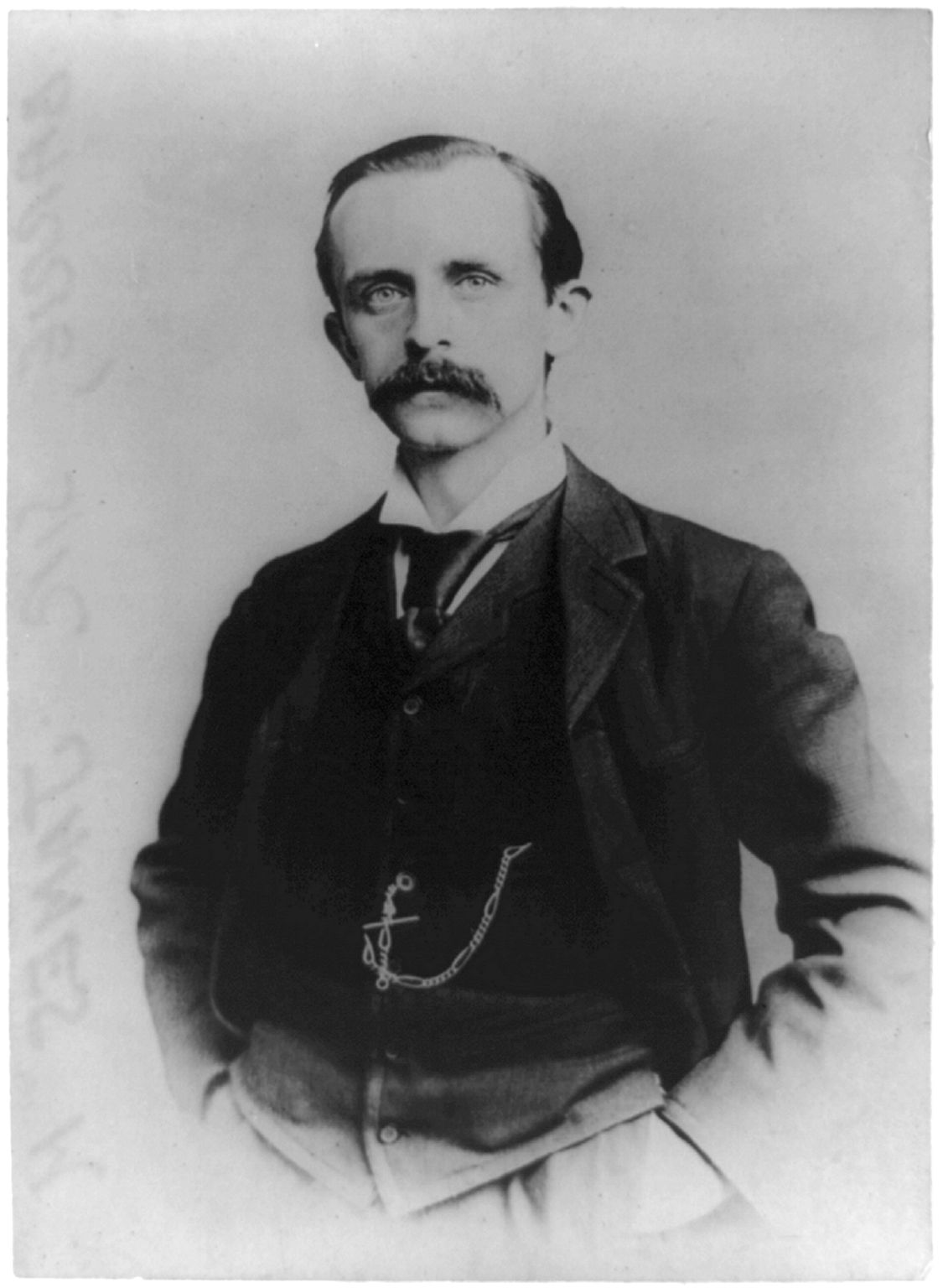
Barrie, c. 1895

Barrie moved in literary circles and had many famous friends in addition to his professional collaborators. Novelist George Meredith was an early social patron. He had a long correspondence with Robert Louis Stevenson, who lived in Samoa at the time. Stevenson invited Barrie to visit him, but the two never met. He was also friends with S. R. Crockett who like Barrie would sometimes write in the Scots dialect. George Bernard Shaw was his neighbour in London for several years, and once participated in a Western that Barrie scripted and filmed. H. G. Wells was a friend of many years, and tried to intervene when Barrie's marriage fell apart. Barrie met Thomas Hardy through Hugh Clifford while he was staying in London. He was friends with Nobel prize winner John Galsworthy.

Barrie remained in touch with his roots and visited his hometown of Kirriemuir regularly with his wards. When choosing his first personal secretary, Barrie chose E. V. Lucas's wife, Elizabeth Lucas, who had Scottish ancestry despite her more immediate American parentage. After Elizabeth Lucas moved to Paris, France, Barrie chose Cynthia Asquith as his personal secretary.

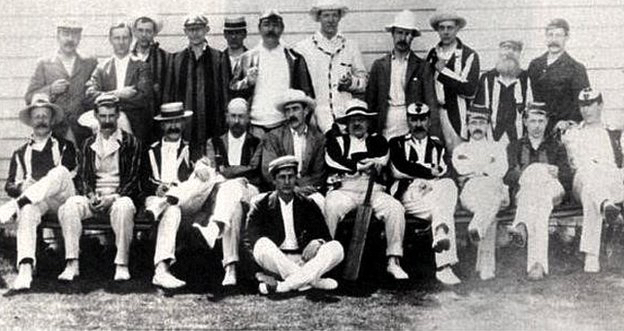
Authors v Artists cricket match in London, May 1903. Barrie, who joined the newly formed Authors Cricket Club in 1891, is seated in the front row, 3rd from right.

After the First World War, Barrie sometimes stayed at Stanway House near the village of Stanway in Gloucestershire. He paid for the pavilion at Stanway cricket ground. In 1887, he founded an amateur cricket team for friends of similarly limited playing ability, and named it the Allahakbarries under the mistaken belief that "Allah akbar" meant "Heaven help us" in Arabic, rather than "God is great". Some of the best-known British authors from the era played on the team at various times, including H. G. Wells, Rudyard Kipling, Arthur Conan Doyle, P. G. Wodehouse, Jerome K. Jerome, G. K. Chesterton, A. A. Milne, E. W. Hornung, A. E. W. Mason, Walter Raleigh, E. V. Lucas, Maurice Hewlett, Owen Seaman (editor of Punch), Bernard Partridge, George Cecil Ives, George Llewelyn Davies (see below) and the son of Alfred Tennyson. In 1891, Barrie joined the newly formed Authors Cricket Club and also played for its cricket team, the Authors XI, alongside Doyle, Wodehouse and Milne. The Allahakbarries and the Authors XI continued to exist side by side until 1912.

Barrie befriended Africa explorer Joseph Thomson and Antarctica explorer Robert Falcon Scott. He was godfather to Scott's son Peter, and was one of the seven people to whom Scott wrote letters in the final hours of his life during his expedition to the South Pole, asking Barrie to take care of his wife Kathleen and son Peter. Barrie was so proud of the letter that he carried it around for the rest of his life.

In 1896, his agent Addison Bright persuaded him to meet with Broadway producer Charles Frohman, who became his financial backer and a close friend, as well. Frohman was responsible for producing the debut of Peter Pan in both England and the US, as well as other productions of Barrie's plays. He famously declined a lifeboat seat when the RMS Lusitania was sunk by a German U-boat in the North Atlantic. Actress Rita Jolivet stood with Frohman, George Vernon and Captain Alick Scott at the end of Lusitania's sinking, but she survived the sinking and recalled Frohman paraphrasing Peter Pan: 'Why fear death? It is the most beautiful adventure that life gives us.' Barrie had himself sailed on one of the Lusitania's final Atlantic crossings in September 1914, during which rumours circulated amongst the passengers that the liner was to be transferred to the British Admiralty for troopship duties on arrival in New York.

His secretary from 1917, Cynthia Asquith, was the daughter-in-law of H. H. Asquith, British Prime Minister from 1908 to 1916. In the 1930s, Barrie met and told stories to the young daughters of the Duke of York, the future Queen Elizabeth II and Princess Margaret. After meeting him, the three-year-old Princess Margaret announced, "He is my greatest friend and I am his greatest friend".

== Marriage ==
Barrie became acquainted with actress Mary Ansell in 1891, when he asked his friend Jerome K. Jerome for a pretty actress to play a role in his play Walker, London. The two became friends, and she helped his family to care for him when he fell very ill in 1893 and 1894. They married in Kirriemuir on 9 July 1894, shortly after Barrie recovered, and Mary retired from the stage. The wedding was a small ceremony in his parents' home, in the Scottish tradition. The relationship was reportedly unconsummated, and the couple had no children.

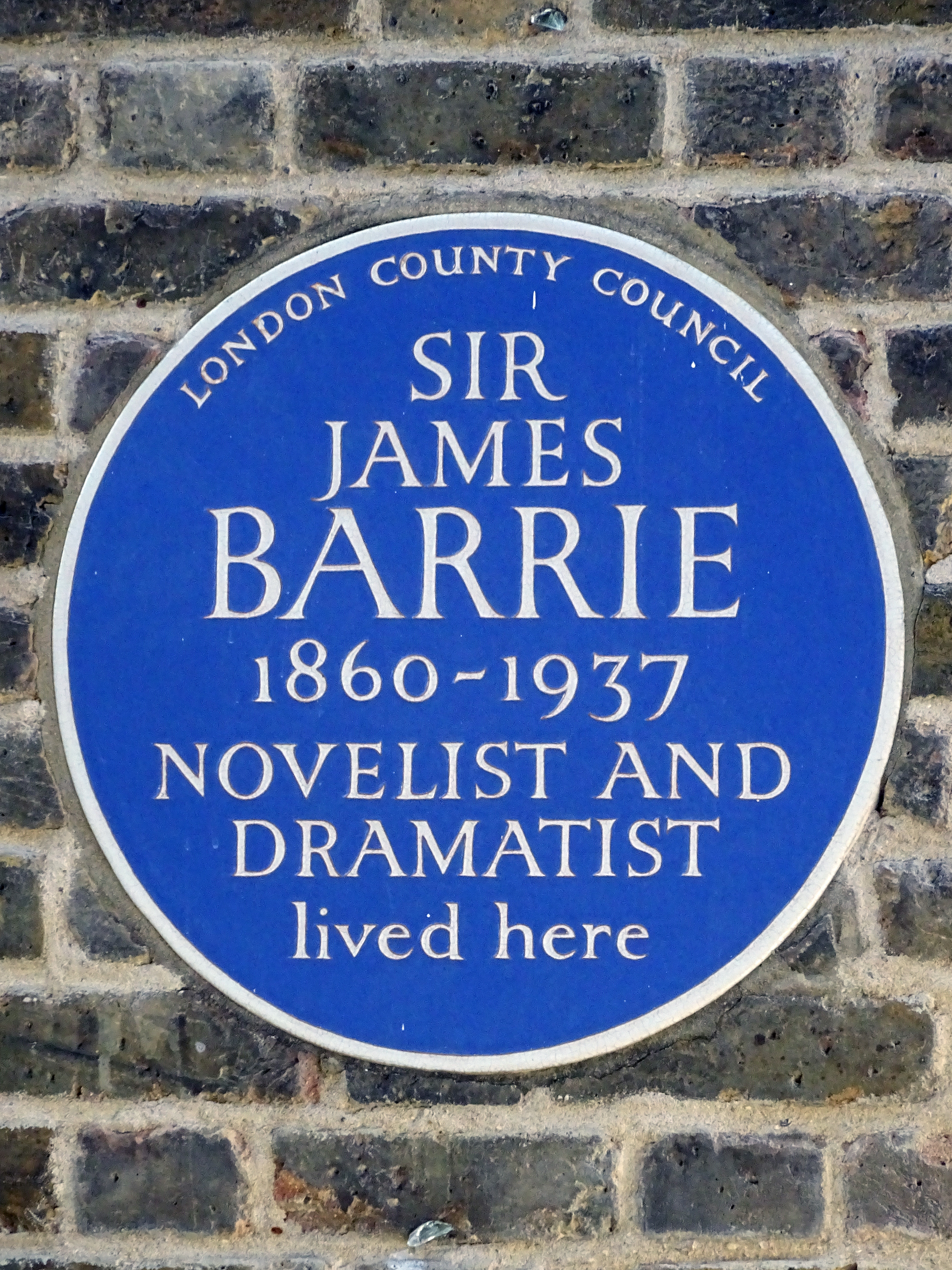
Blue plaque on 100 Bayswater Road, London where Barrie lived

In 1895, the Barries bought a house on Gloucester Road, in South Kensington. Barrie would take long walks in nearby Kensington Gardens, and in 1900 the couple moved into a house directly overlooking the gardens at 100 Bayswater Road. Mary had a flair for interior design and set about transforming the ground floor, creating two large reception rooms with painted panelling and adding fashionable features, such as a conservatory. In the same year, Mary found Black Lake Cottage at Farnham in Surrey, which became the couple's "bolt hole" where Barrie could entertain his cricketing friends and the Llewelyn Davies family.

Beginning in mid-1908, Mary had an affair with Gilbert Cannan (who was twenty years younger than she and an associate of Barrie in his anti-censorship activities), including a visit together to Black Lake Cottage, known only to the house staff. When Barrie learned of the affair in July 1909, he demanded that she end it, but she refused. To avoid the scandal of divorce, he offered a legal separation if she would agree not to see Cannan any more, but she still refused. Barrie sued for divorce on the grounds of infidelity; the divorce was granted in October 1909. Knowing how painful the divorce was for him, some of Barrie's friends wrote to a number of newspaper editors asking them not to publish the story. In the event, only three newspapers did. Barrie continued to support Mary financially even after she married Cannan, by giving her an annual allowance, which was handed over at a private dinner held on her and Barrie's wedding anniversary.

== Llewelyn Davies family ==
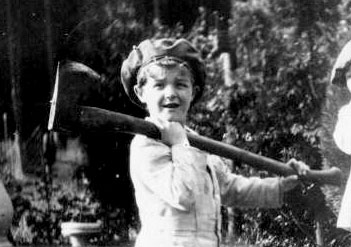
Jack Llewelyn Davies acting in Barrie's pirate adventure, The Boy Castaways of Black Lake Island, 1901

The Llewelyn Davies family played an important part in Barrie's literary and personal life, consisting of Arthur (1863–1907), Sylvia (1866–1910) (daughter of George du Maurier), and their five sons: George (1893–1915), John (Jack) (1894–1959), Peter (1897–1960), Michael (1900–1921) and Nicholas (Nico) (1903–1980).

Barrie became acquainted with the family in 1897, meeting George and Jack (and baby Peter) with their nurse (nanny) Mary Hodgson in London's Kensington Gardens. He lived nearby and often walked his Saint Bernard dog Porthos in the park. He entertained the boys regularly with his ability to wiggle his ears and eyebrows, and with his stories. He did not meet Sylvia until a chance encounter at a dinner party in December. She told Barrie that Peter had been named after the title character in her father's novel, Peter Ibbetson.

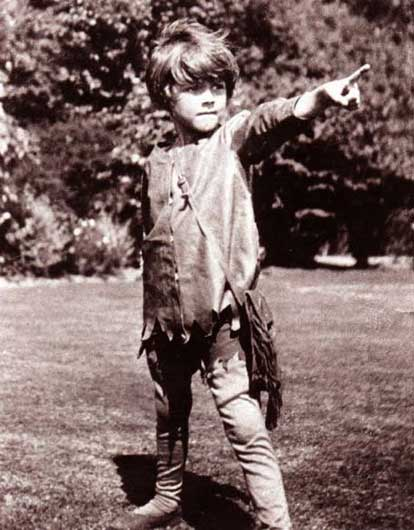
Michael Llewelyn Davies as Peter Pan, 1906. Photo was taken by Barrie at Cudlow House in Rustington, West Sussex

Barrie became a regular visitor at the Davies household and a common companion to Sylvia and her boys, despite the fact that both he and she were married to other people. In 1901, he invited the Davies family to Black Lake Cottage, where he produced an album of captioned photographs of the boys acting out a pirate adventure, entitled The Boy Castaways of Black Lake Island. Barrie had two copies made, one of which he gave to Arthur, who misplaced it on a train. The only surviving copy is held at the Beinecke Rare Book and Manuscript Library at Yale University.

The character of Peter Pan was invented to entertain George and Jack. Barrie would say, to amuse them, that their little brother Peter could fly. He claimed that babies were birds before they were born; parents put bars on nursery windows to keep the little ones from flying away. This grew into a tale of a baby boy who did fly away.

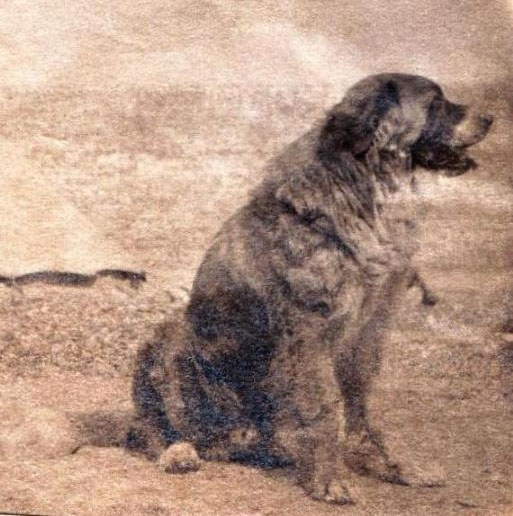
Barrie’s Saint Bernard dog Porthos in 1899

Arthur Llewelyn Davies died in 1907, and "Uncle Jim" became even more involved with the Davies family, providing financial support to them. (His income from Peter Pan and other works was easily adequate to provide for their living expenses and education.) Following Sylvia's death in 1910, Barrie claimed that they had recently been engaged to be married. Her will indicated nothing to that effect but specified her wish for "J. M. B." to be trustee and guardian to the boys, along with her mother Emma, her brother Guy du Maurier and Arthur's brother Compton. It expressed her confidence in Barrie as the boys' caretaker and her wish for "the boys to treat him (& their uncles) with absolute confidence & straightforwardness & to talk to him about everything." When copying the will informally for Sylvia's family a few months later, Barrie inserted himself elsewhere: Sylvia had written that she would like Mary Hodgson, the boys' nurse, to continue taking care of them, and for "Jenny" (referring to Hodgson's sister) to come and help her; Barrie instead wrote, "Jimmy" (Sylvia's nickname for him). Barrie and Hodgson did not get along well but served together as surrogate parents until the boys were grown.

Barrie also had friendships with other children, both before he met the Davies boys and after they had grown up, and there has since been unsubstantiated speculation that Barrie was a paedophile. One source for the speculation is a scene in the novel The Little White Bird, in which the protagonist helps a small boy undress for bed, and at the boy's request they sleep in the same bed. However, there is no evidence that Barrie had sexual contact with children, nor that he was suspected of it at the time. Nico, the youngest of the brothers, denied as an adult that Barrie ever behaved inappropriately. "I don't believe that Uncle Jim ever experienced what one might call 'a stirring in the undergrowth' for anyone—man, woman, or child", he stated. "He was an innocent—which is why he could write Peter Pan." His relationships with the surviving Davies boys continued well beyond their childhood and adolescence.

The Peter Pan statue in Kensington Gardens, erected secretly overnight for May Morning in 1912, was supposed to be modelled upon old photographs of Michael dressed as the character. However, the sculptor, Sir George Frampton, used a different child as a model, leaving Barrie disappointed with the result. "It doesn't show the devil in Peter", he said.

Barrie suffered bereavements with the boys, losing the two to whom he was closest in their early twenties. George was killed in action in 1915, in the First World War. Michael, with whom Barrie corresponded daily while at boarding school and university, drowned in 1921, with his friend, Rupert Buxton, at a known danger spot at Sandford Lock near Oxford, one month short of his 21st birthday. Some years after Barrie's death, Peter compiled his Morgue from family letters and papers, interpolated with his own informed comments on his family and their relationship with Barrie. Peter died in 1960 by throwing himself in front of an Underground train at Sloane Square station.

== Death ==
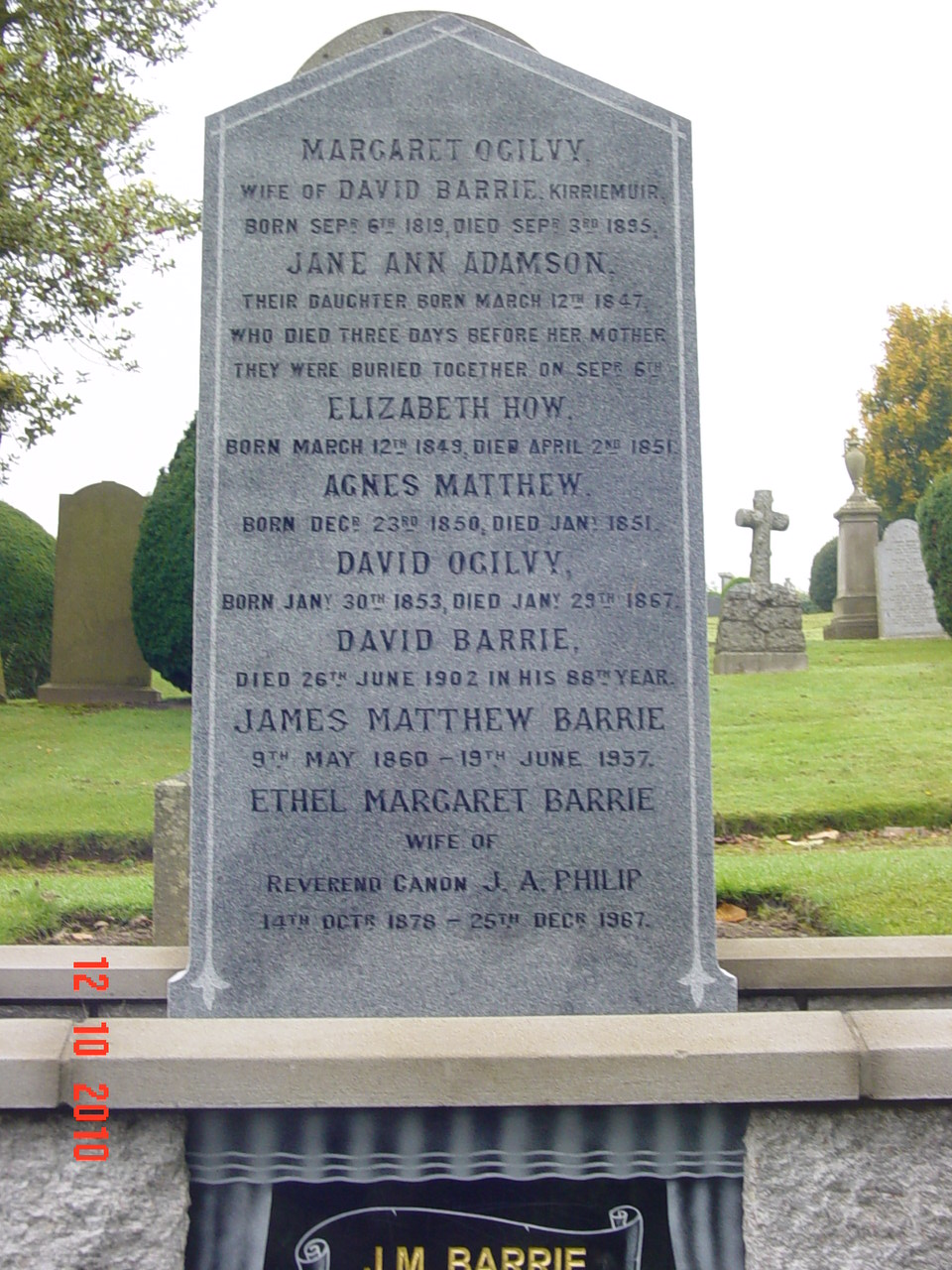
Gravestone of J. M. Barrie in Kirriemuir Cemetery

Barrie died of pneumonia at a nursing home in Manchester Street, Marylebone on 19 June 1937. He was buried at Kirriemuir next to his parents and two of his siblings. His birthplace at 9 Brechin Road is maintained as a museum by the National Trust for Scotland.

Barrie left the bulk of his estate to his secretary Lady Cynthia Asquith, but excluding the rights to all Peter Pan works (which included The Little White Bird, Peter Pan in Kensington Gardens, the play Peter Pan, or The Boy Who Would Not Grow Up and the novel Peter and Wendy), whose copyright he had previously given to Great Ormond Street Hospital in London. The surviving Llewelyn Davies boys received legacies, and he made provisions for his former wife Mary Ansell to receive an annuity during her lifetime.

His will also left £500 to the Bower Free Church in Caithness to mark the memory of Rev James Winter who was to have married Barrie's sister in June 1892 but was killed in a fall from his horse in May 1892. Barrie had several connections to the Free Church of Scotland, including his maternal uncle Rev David Ogilvy (1822–1904), who was minister of Dalziel Church in Motherwell. James and his brother William Winter (also a Free Church minister) were both born in Cortachy the sons of Rev William Winter. Cortachy is just west of Kirriemuir and the Winters seem closely connected to the Ogilvy family.

== Biographies ==
=== Books ===
- Hammerton, J. A. (1929). Barrie: the Story of a Genius. New York: Dodd, Mead & Company.
- Darlington, W. A. (1938). J. M. Barrie. London and Glasgow: Blackie & Son.
- Chalmers, Patrick (1938). The Barrie Inspiration. Peter Davies. ISBN 978-1-4733-1220-3.
- Mackail, Denis (1941). Barrie: The Story of J. M. B. New York: C. Scribner's Sons.
- Dunbar, Janet (1970). J. M. Barrie: The Man Behind the Image. London: Collins. ISBN 0-00-211384-8.
- Birkin, Andrew (2003). J. M. Barrie and the Lost Boys: The Real Story Behind Peter Pan (Revised ed.). Yale University Press. ISBN 978-0-300-09822-8.
- Chaney, Lisa (2006). Hide-and-Seek with Angels: A Life of J. M. Barrie. Arrow. ISBN 978-0-09-945323-9.
- Dudgeon, Piers (2009). Captivated: J. M. Barrie, the du Mauriers & the Dark Side of Neverland. Vintage Books. ISBN 978-0-09-952045-0.
- Telfer, Kevin (2010). Peter Pan's First XI: The Extraordinary Story of J. M. Barrie's Cricket Team. Sceptre. ISBN 978-0-340-91945-3.
- Ridley, Rosalind (2016). Peter Pan and the Mind of J. M. Barrie: An Exploration of Cognition and Consciousness. Cambridge Scholars Publishing. ISBN 978-1-4438-9107-3.
- Dudgeon, Piers (2016). J. M. Barrie and the Boy Who Inspired Him. Thomas Dunne Books. ISBN 978-1-250-08779-9.

=== Journal ===
- Stokes, Sewell (November 1941). "James M Barrie". New York Theatre Arts Inc. 25 (11): 845–848.

=== Film, television and stage ===
- The Lost Boys (1978). Ian Holm (as J.M. Barrie), Andrew Birkin (writer). BBC.
- The Man Who Was Peter Pan (1998) is a play by Allan Knee, a semi-biographical version of Barrie's life and relationship with the Llewelyn Davies family.
- Finding Neverland (2004) with Johnny Depp (as J.M. Barrie), Kate Winslet (Sylvia Llewelyn Davies), Marc Forster (director), based on Allan Knee's play.
- The Boy James (2012) by Alexander Wright (of Belt Up Theatre), is a one act play inspired by his life and work.
- Finding Neverland (2012) by Diane Paulus, is a musical about the creation of Peter Pan based on the film and starring Matthew Morrison and Laura Michelle Kelly.

== Honours ==
=== Personal ===
Barrie was created a baronet by King George V in 1913. He was made a member of the Order of Merit in 1922.

In 1919, he was elected Rector of the University of St Andrews for a three-year term. In 1922, he delivered his celebrated Rectorial Address on Courage at St Andrews, and visited University College Dundee with Earl Haig to open its new playing fields, with Barrie bowling a few balls to Haig. He served as Chancellor of the University of Edinburgh from 1930 to 1937.

Barrie was the only person to receive the Freedom of Kirriemuir in a ceremony on 7 June 1930 in Kirriemuir Town Hall where he was presented with a silver casket containing the freedom scroll. The casket was made by silversmiths Brook & Son in Edinburgh in 1929 and is decorated with images of sites in Kirriemuir which held significant memories for Barrie: Kirriemuir Townhouse, Strathview, Window in Thrums, the statue of Peter Pan in Kensington Gardens and the Barrie Cricket Pavilion. The casket is on display in the Kirrimuir Gateway to the Glens Museum in the Kirriemuir Town House.

Coat of arms of J. M. Barrie
| Crest An open book amid reeds all Proper. Escutcheon Barry of six Argent and Gules in chief a lion passant guardant counterchanged and issuant from the base reeds Proper. Motto Amour De La Bonte (Love of Goodness) |

=== Legacy ===
- The Sir James Barrie Primary School in Wandsworth, South West London is named after him.
- The Barrie School in Silver Spring, Maryland, is also named in his honour.

== Bibliography ==
=== Peter Pan ===
- The Little White Bird, or Adventures in Kensington Gardens (1902)
- Peter Pan; or, the Boy Who Wouldn't Grow Up (staged 1904, published 1928)
- Peter Pan in Kensington Gardens (1906)
- When Wendy Grew Up: An Afterthought (written – 1908, published 1957)
- Peter and Wendy (novel) (1911)

=== Other works by year ===
- Better Dead (1887)
- Auld Licht Idylls (1888)
- When a Man's Single (1888)
- A Window in Thrums (1889)
- My Lady Nicotine (1890), republished in 1926 with the subtitle A Study in Smoke
- The Little Minister (1891)
- Richard Savage (play) (1891)
- Ibsen's Ghost (Toole Up-to-Date) (play) (1891)
- Walker, London (1892)
- A Holiday in Bed (1892)
- Jane Annie (opera), music by Ernest Ford, libretto by Barrie and Arthur Conan Doyle (1893)
- A Powerful Drug and Other Stories (1893)
- A Tillyloss Scandal (1893)
- Two of Them (1893)
- A Lady's Shoe (1893) (two short stories: A Lady's Shoe, The Inconsiderate Waiter)
- Life in a Country Manse (1894)
- Scotland's Lament: A Poem on the Death of Robert Louis Stevenson (1895)
- Sentimental Tommy, The Story of His Boyhood (1896)
- Margaret Ogilvy (1896)
- The Little Minister (play) (1897)
- Jess (1898)
- Tommy and Grizel (1900)
- The Wedding Guest (1900)
- The Boy Castaways of Black Lake Island (1901)
- Quality Street (play) (1901)
- The Admirable Crichton (play) (1902)
- Little Mary (play) (1903)
- Alice Sit-by-the-Fire (play) (1905)
- Pantaloon (1905)
- What Every Woman Knows (play) (1908)
- Half an Hour (play) (1913)
- Half Hours (1914) includes:
  - Pantaloon
  - The Twelve-Pound Look (1911)
  - Rosalind
  - The Will
- The Legend of Leonora (1914)
- Der Tag (The Tragic Man) (Short play) (1914)
- The New Word (play) (1915)
- Charles Frohman: A Tribute (1915)
- Rosy Rapture (play) (1915)
- A Kiss for Cinderella (play) (1916)
- Real Thing at Last (screenplay) (1916)
- Shakespeare's Legacy (play) (1916)
- A Strange Play (play) (1917)
- Charwomen and the War or The Old Lady Shows her Medals (play) (1917)
- Dear Brutus (play) (1917)
- La Politesse (play) (1918)
- Echoes of the War (1918) Four plays, includes:
  - The New Word
  - The Old Lady Shows Her Medals (basis for the movie Seven Days Leave (1930), starring Gary Cooper)
  - A Well-Remembered Voice
  - Barbara's Wedding
- Mary Rose (play) (1920)
- Courage, the Rectorial Address delivered at St. Andrews University (1922)
- The Author (1925)
- Biographical Introduction to Scott's Last Expedition (preface) (orig. pub. 1913, introduction included in 1925 edition only)
- Cricket (1926)
- Shall We Join the Ladies? (1928) includes:
  - Shall We Join the Ladies?
  - Half an Hour
  - Seven Women
  - Old Friends
- The Greenwood Hat (1930)
- Farewell Miss Julie Logan (1932)
- The Boy David (1936)
- M'Connachie and J. M. B. (1938)
- story treatment for film As You Like It (1936)
- The Reconstruction of the Crime (play), co-written with E.V. Lucas (undated, first published 2017)
- Stories by English Authors: London (selected by Scribners, as contributor)
- Stories by English Authors: Scotland (selected by Scribners, as contributor)
- preface to The Young Visiters or, Mr. Salteena's Plan by Daisy Ashford
- The Earliest Plays of J. M. Barrie: Bandelero the Bandit, Bohemia and Caught Napping, edited by R.D.S. Jack (2014)

== Archival collections ==
- J. M. Barrie Collection at the Beinecke Rare Book & Manuscript Library
- J. M. Barrie Collection at the Harry Ransom Center

Academic offices
| Preceded by The Earl Haig | Rector of the University of St Andrews; 1919–1922 | Succeeded by Rudyard Kipling |
| Preceded by The Earl of Balfour | Chancellor of the University of Edinburgh; 1930–1937 | Succeeded by The Lord Tweedsmuir |
Baronetage of the United Kingdom
| New creation | Baronet (of Adelphi Terrace); 1913–1937 | Extinct |
| Preceded by Bagot baronets | Barrie baronets of Adelphi Terrace; 14 June 1913 | Succeeded by Denny baronets |
