= Mary Ansell (actress) =

English actress and author (1861–1950)

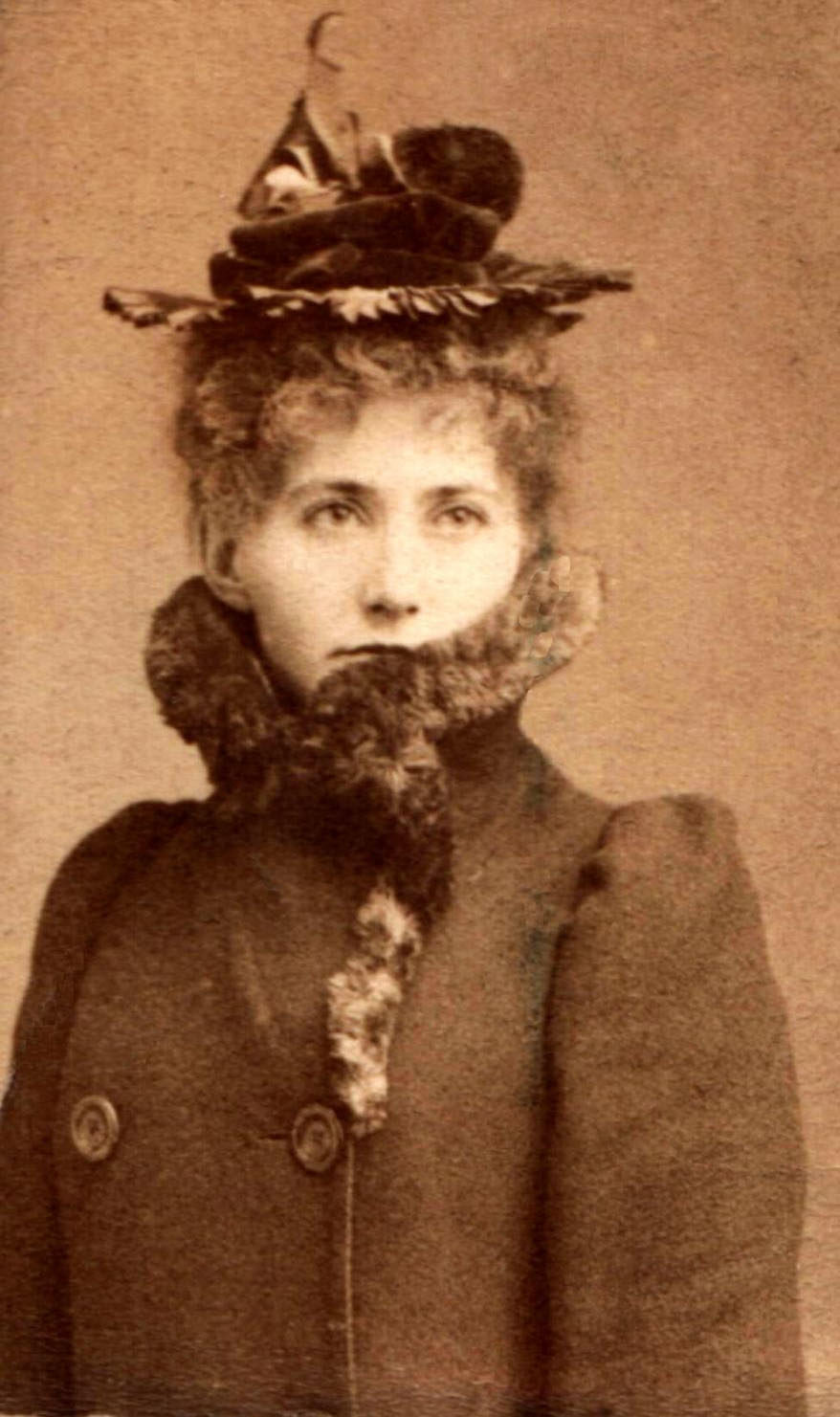
- Ansell in 1891
- Born: 1 March 1861; London, England
- Died: 30 June 1950 (aged 89); Biarritz, France
- Occupations: Actress; author
- Spouses: J. M. Barrie (m. 1894; div. 1909) Gilbert Cannan (m. 1910–1918)

Mary Ansell (1 March 1861 – 30 June 1950) was an English actress and author. She was born in Paddington (London), the third child of George and Mary Ansell, who ran the King's Head pub in Paddington. Ansell's father died in 1875 and the family moved from the pub where they had been living to Hastings, in Sussex.

== Stage career and first marriage ==
Ansell's first stage performance was in 1890 in a play called Harbour Lights. She met J. M. Barrie in 1891, when he was looking for an actress for a role in his play Walker, London. She was introduced to him by their mutual friend Jerome K Jerome.

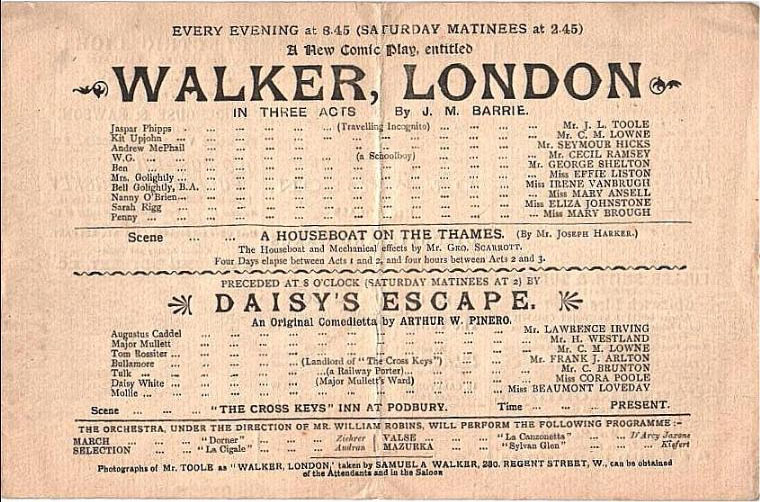
Programme Walker, London, 1892

Barrie and Ansell developed a friendship and she nursed him when he fell ill in 1894. After his recovery, they married on 9 July 1894 in a simple ceremony in Kirriemuir, his home town.

The couple first bought a house at 133 Gloucester Road, Kensington and a few years later, in 1900, moved to Leinster Corner, a house at 100 Bayswater Road overlooking Kensington Gardens. In the same year, Ansell bought Black Lake Cottage, a country house in Farnham, Surrey where they would go at weekends and in summer.

During her honeymoon in Switzerland, she and Barrie adopted a St. Bernard puppy, Porthos, marking the start of her lifelong love of dogs. After Porthos's death, they took on a black and white Newfoundland, Luath, who was the inspiration for Nana in Peter Pan.

In 1897 Barrie met Sylvia Llewelyn Davies and her sons, first George, Jack and Peter, and later Michael and Nico and enjoyed a close friendship with the family, to the detriment of Ansell who felt neglected. To fill her time, Ansell developed a strong interest in interior design and gardening which kept her occupied at both Black Lake Cottage and Leinster Corner.

She wrote about her passions in three books, Happy Houses, The Happy Garden (1912) and Dogs and Men (1924).

== Divorce and second marriage ==
In 1907, Ansell met Gilbert Cannan who aspired to be a writer and came to work with Barrie on an anti-censorship campaign. Cannan had been courting sculptor Kathleen Bruce but was heartbroken when the latter accepted Robert Falcon Scott's marriage proposal. He turned to the Barries for comfort and became very close to Ansell, leading to an affair, despite the 20-year difference in age.

When Barrie learned of the affair in July 1909, he demanded that she end it, but she refused. To avoid the scandal of divorce, he offered a legal separation if she would agree not to see Cannan any more, but she still refused. Barrie sued for divorce on the grounds of infidelity, but in the course of divorce proceedings, it was revealed the marriage had been unconsummated. The decree nisi was granted in October 1909. Ansell and Cannan married the following year and in 1913 they moved to a disused tower mill in Hawridge, Buckinghamshire, Hawridge Windmill.

Her marriage to Cannan was not a happy one as Cannan suffered a mental breakdown and was unfaithful; he had an affair with their maid Gwen Wilson, who became pregnant. In 1917, Ansell left Cannan and found herself in straitened circumstances. She was working for the war effort rolling bandages and packing medical supplies when Barrie came to find her and offered financial help, giving her an annual allowance which carried on until his death in 1937. She was left a bequest of £1,000 and an annuity of £600 in his will.

== Death ==
In the 1920s, Ansell moved to Biarritz (France). Barrie paid for a villa to be built for her, the Villa La Esquina, rue Constantine, where she died on 30 June 1950. She is buried in the Cemetery Sabaou, in Biarritz.
