= The Little White Bird =

1902 novel by J. M. Barrie

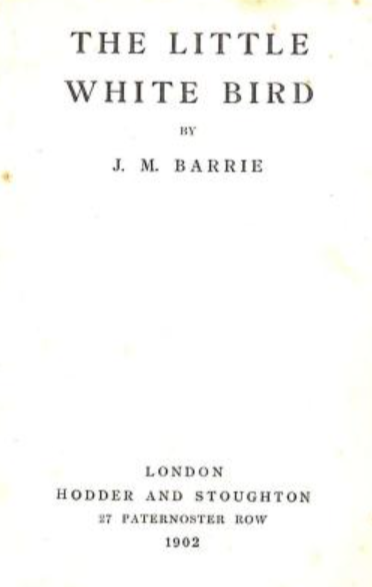
- Author: J. M. Barrie
- Genre: Fairytale fantasy, fictional diary, novel for adult readers
- Publisher: Hodder & Stoughton (UK); Charles Scribner's Sons (US)
- Publication date: November 1902 (both)
- Publication place: United Kingdom
- Pages: 349 (US: Scribner's, 1902)
- OCLC: 4789092
- LC Class: PZ3.B277 Li
- Followed by: Peter Pan in Kensington Gardens

The Little White Bird is a novel by the Scottish writer J. M. Barrie, ranging in tone from fantasy and whimsy to social comedy with dark, aggressive undertones. It was published in November 1902 by Hodder & Stoughton in the UK and Scribner's in the US. Scribner's also published it serially in the monthly Scribner's Magazine from August to November.

The book attained prominence and longevity thanks to several chapters written in a softer tone than the rest, which introduced the character and mythology of Peter Pan. In 1906, those chapters were published separately as a children's book, Peter Pan in Kensington Gardens.

The Peter Pan story began as one chapter and grew to an "elaborate book-within-a-book" of more than one hundred pages during the four years Barrie worked on The Little White Bird. The complete book has also been published under the title The Little White Bird, or Adventures in Kensington Gardens.

== Plot introduction ==
The Little White Bird is a series of short episodes, including both accounts of the narrator's day-to-day activities in contemporary London and fanciful tales set in Kensington Gardens and elsewhere.

== Plot summary ==
The story is set in several locations; the earlier chapters are set in the city of London, contemporaneous to the time of Barrie's writing, involving some time travel of a few years and other fantasy elements while remaining within the London setting. The middle chapters that later became Peter Pan in Kensington Gardens are set in London's famous Kensington Gardens, introduced by the statement that "All perambulators lead to Kensington Gardens". The Kensington Gardens chapters include detailed descriptions of the features of the Gardens, along with fantasy names given to the locations by the story's characters, especially after "Lock-Out Time", described by Barrie as the time at the end of the day when the park gates are closed to the public, and the fairies and other magical inhabitants of the park can move about more freely than during the daylight, when they must hide from ordinary people. The third section of the book, following the Kensington Gardens chapters, is again set generally in London, though there are some short returns to the Gardens that are not part of the Peter Pan stories. In a two-page diversion in chapter 24, Barrie brings the story to Patagonia and a journey by ship returning to England at the "white cliffs of Albion".

== Characters ==
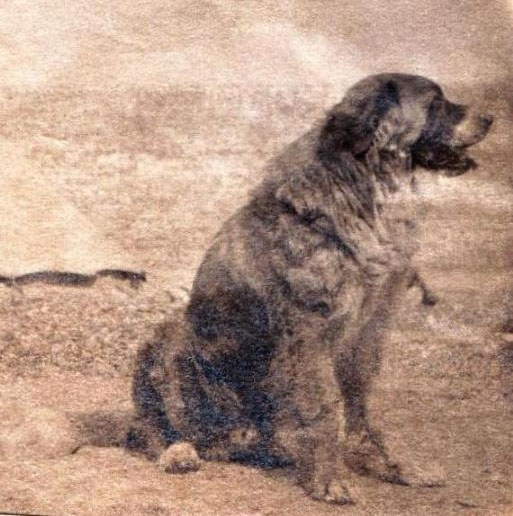
Porthos in 1899.

- Captain W____, the first person narrator, described by the author and filmmaker Andrew Birkin as "Barrie thinly disguised". Captain W____, although narrating the story, also refers within the story to his own writing of the story, when in the book's conclusion he gives the newly-completed manuscript to the character Mary (mother of David and later Barbara, who has just been born), explaining to her that it is the story of her and her children, which she apparently wanted to write before her daughter was born and which she would have called "The Little White Bird".
- David, a boy six years old at the start of the book, but who also appears at younger ages throughout the story, including as a foetus in the womb. The character is based on George Llewelyn Davies, one of several children of the Davies family who provided inspiration for many characters in Barrie's writings.
- Mary A____, "The Little Nursery Governess", David's mother, who shares a name with Barrie's wife (born Mary Ansell) but who according to Birkin, is "closely modelled" on Sylvia Llewelyn Davies. During the story, Captain W____ sees Mary progress from young lover, to newlywed, through pregnancy and the birth of David, and as a young mother. The narrator's feelings expressed towards and about Mary vary from affection to anger and jealousy as he competes with her for David's affections.
- Peter Pan, a magical boy who escaped from being human as an infant, and ever since has flown about and cavorted with fairies. He differs from the better-known portrayal of the character, primarily being a newborn baby rather than an older child.
- Maimie Mannering, a four-year-old girl who becomes one of Peter Pan's main cohorts in the Kensington Gardens part of the story. Her part in the adventure begins when she becomes stuck inside Kensington Gardens after "lock-out time" because the fairies have changed the large clock in the garden to show an earlier hour, in preparation for the fairy ball planned for that night. The Maimie character is the literary forerunner of the Wendy Darling character of the later Peter Pan play and novel.
- Porthos, a very large St Bernard, based on Barrie's dog of the same name; Porthos was the literary forerunner of the character Nana, a Newfoundland appearing in the Peter Pan play and novel as the Darling family's nursemaid.

== Major themes ==
The main theme of the book is an exploration of the intimate emotional relationship of the narrator, a childless Victorian retired soldier and London bachelor, with a young boy born to a working-class married couple in the same neighbourhood. The narrator secretly assists the couple financially, while meeting with the young boy in various "adventures", presented in a disjointed series of episodes in the book in which the narrator seeks to find a feeling of closeness with the boy, expressed as a desire for fatherhood, as well as other less clearly defined ideas.

== Literary significance and reception ==
The Little White Bird is best known for its introduction of the character Peter Pan. Although it is one of Barrie's better-known works based on that association, it has been eclipsed by the 1904 stage play Peter Pan, or The Boy Who Wouldn't Grow Up, which introduced the characters of Wendy, Captain Hook, and Tinker Bell, along with much of the Neverland mythos. The later version of the character has been the basis of all popular adaptations and expansions of the material. The stage play became the basis for the 1911 novel Peter and Wendy, later published under the titles Peter Pan and Peter Pan and Wendy. The script of the stage play itself was first published in 1928.

== Peter Pan in Kensington Gardens ==
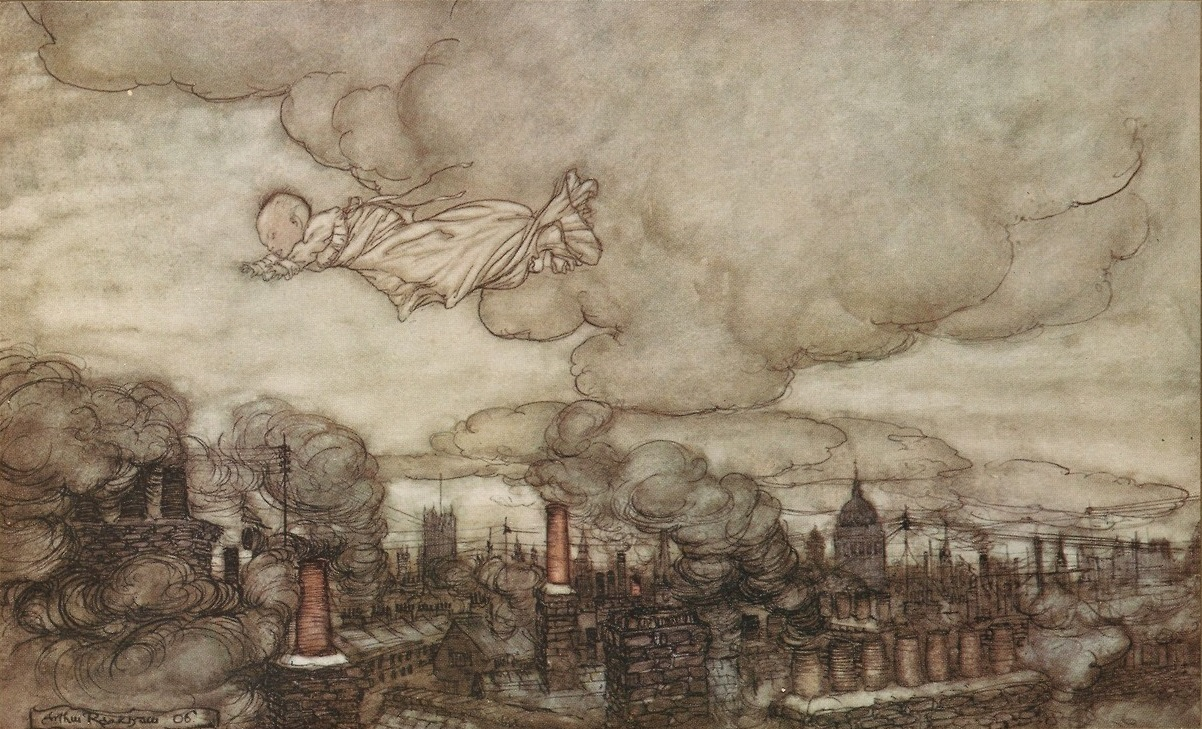
Illustration for Peter Pan in Kensington Gardens by Arthur Rackham, 1906

Following the highly successful debut of the play about Peter Pan in 1904, Barrie's publishers, Hodder and Stoughton, extracted chapters 13–18 of The Little White Bird and published them in 1906 under the title Peter Pan in Kensington Gardens, with illustrations by Arthur Rackham. The text of this version is almost identical to those chapters, with minor changes to the text to read better without the surrounding story. It was presented as a book for children, many of whom had experienced Peter Pan's exploits in the successful stage play.

Although sometimes described as a prelude or (less correctly) prequel to the better-known story told in the play and novel, there are inconsistencies which make the two stories incompatible with each other. Most significant is the character of Peter Pan himself, who is said to be only seven days old, and there isn't "the slightest chance of his ever having [a birthday]"; in the later story his age is never specified, except that he has his baby teeth and is portrayed as school age.
