= The Boy James =

2010 play by Alexander Wright

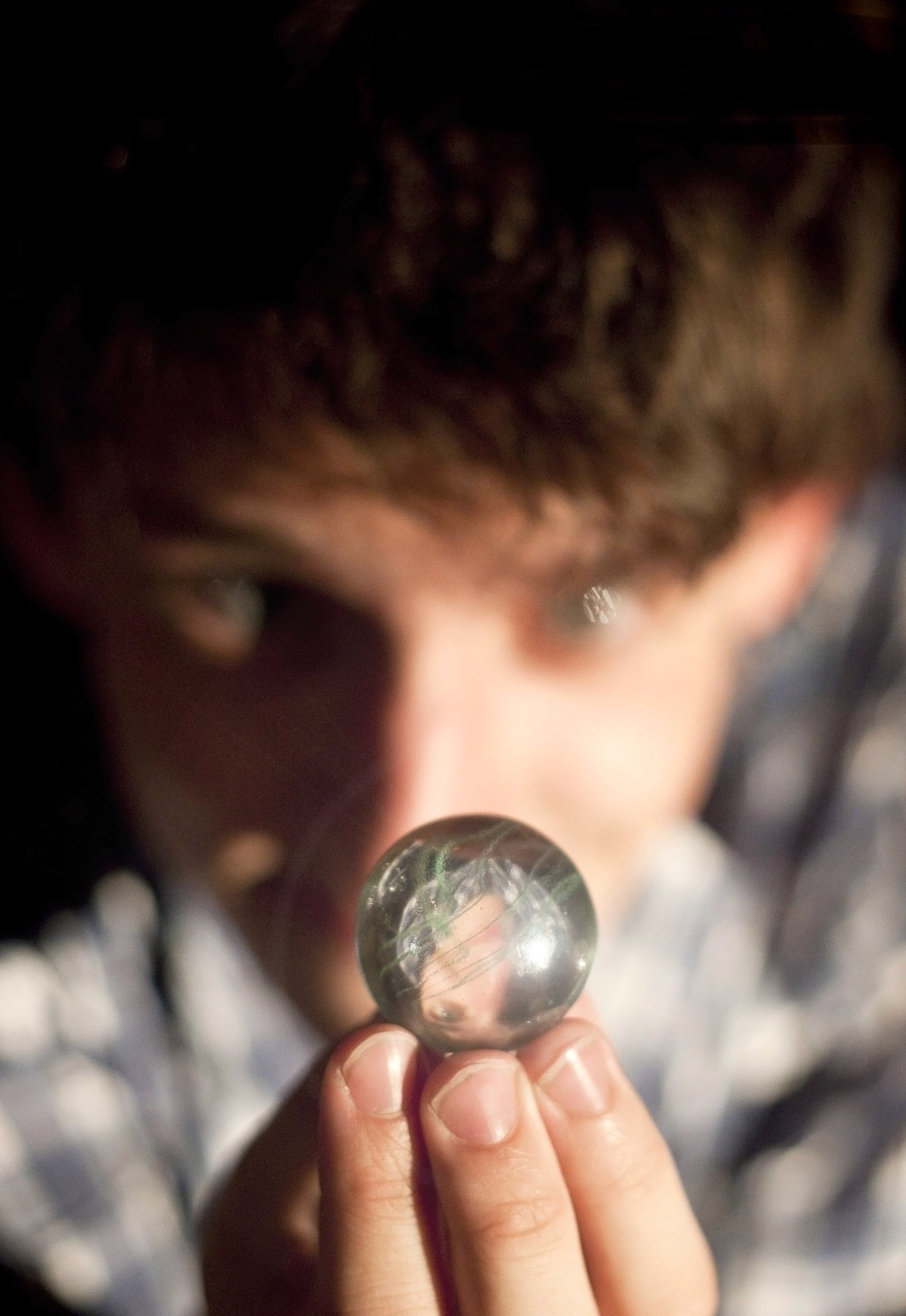
- Jethro Compton as "The Boy"
- Original language: English
- Written by: Alexander Wright
- Characters: "The Boy" "The Girl" "James"

Premiere
- Date: 2010; Edinburgh Fringe Festival in Edinburgh
- Place: Britain

The Boy James is a play written by Alexander Wright that opened in 2010 at the Edinburgh Fringe Festival and featured as part of Belt Up Theatre's 2010 Edinburgh season, The House Above.

Directed by Dominic Allen and produced by Jethro Compton, the play has since been performed in London, across the United Kingdom, and has returned to Edinburgh as part of the Belt Up Theatre 2011 season. Critical and public acclaim has led to the show being the longest running of Belt Up Theatre's repertoire, and was one of the two shows that were part of their international debut in the Adelaide Fringe Festival, in 2012 (alongside Outland).

== The Play ==
Inspired by the life and work of J. M. Barrie, The Boy James is the story of one boy's awakening to the harsh realities of adulthood. The play invites the audience to join James as he escapes these harsh realities by traveling in his mind back to Neverland.

The Boy James is presented by Belt Up Theatre, who The Observer says are "changing the future of British theatre," and whom Time Out London call "fringe royalty."

== Characters ==
- "The Boy"
- "The Girl"
- "James"

== Cast ==
=== 2010: Original Edinburgh cast ===
- Jethro Compton as The Boy
- Veronica Hare as The Girl
- James Wilkes as James

=== 2011: London and Touring cast ===
- Jethro Compton as The Boy
- Lucy Farrett as The Girl
- James Wilkes as James

=== 2011: Edinburgh cast ===
- Jethro Compton as The Boy
- Lucy Farrett as The Girl
- Dan Wood as James

=== 2012: London and international cast ===
- Jethro Compton as The Boy
- Serena Manteghi as The Girl
- Dominic Allen as James

=== 2015: Castle Theatre Company, Durham University ===
- George Rexstrew as The Boy
- Jenny Walser as The Girl
- Hugh Train as James

== Reception ==
Overall the show has attracted great acclaim by both audience member and reviewer alike, which has led it to several successful runs. Stephen Fry tweeted that he had "...just been knocked out by The Boy James... Still drying my eyes." and The Stage called it "Belt Up's finest performance.". In the 2011 presentation The Guardian noted that Wright's play "reaches out for something he can't grasp," and, "the overall effect is of something almost, but not quite, enchanting.". Its Adelaide production was incredibly favoured, spoken of highly by leading publication The Adelaide Advertiser 'its delivery is so disarming, charming and well performed that it is well worth a look'. and by leading theatre critic outlet Adelaide Theatre Guide 'An unsettling, thought-provoking and imaginative work from a theatre company to keep an eye on; here's hoping they'll make the Adelaide Fringe a regular destination.'
