= Peter Pan in Kensington Gardens =

1906 novel by J. M. Barrie

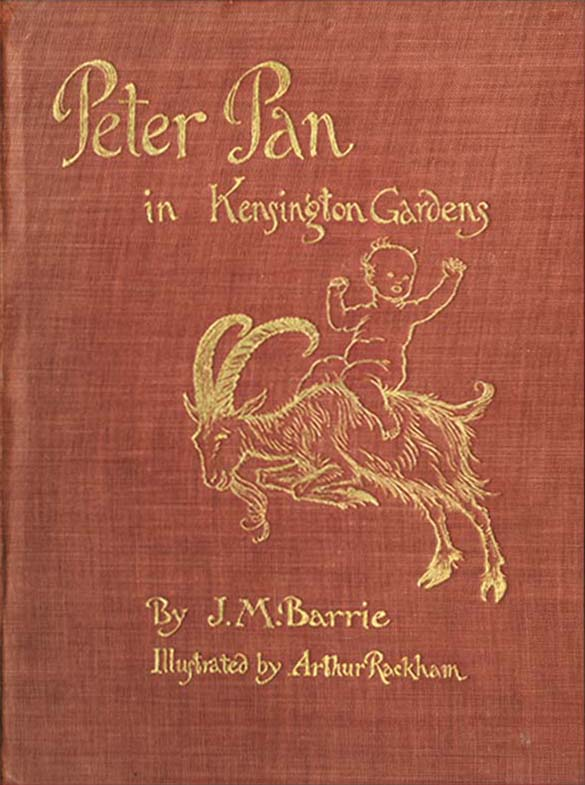
- First edition
- Author: J. M. Barrie
- Illustrator: Arthur Rackham
- Cover artist: Arthur Rackham
- Language: English
- Genre: fantasy, children's literature
- Publisher: Hodder & Stoughton
- Publication date: 1906
- Publication place: United Kingdom
- Preceded by: The Little White Bird
- Followed by: Peter and Wendy or Peter Pan, or the Boy Who Wouldn't Grow Up

Peter Pan in Kensington Gardens is a novel by J. M. Barrie, illustrated by Arthur Rackham, and published by Hodder & Stoughton in late November or early December 1906; it is one of four major literary works by Barrie featuring the widely known literary character he created, Peter Pan. Most of the text originally appeared as chapters 13–18 of Barrie's 1902 novel The Little White Bird.

== Plot summary ==
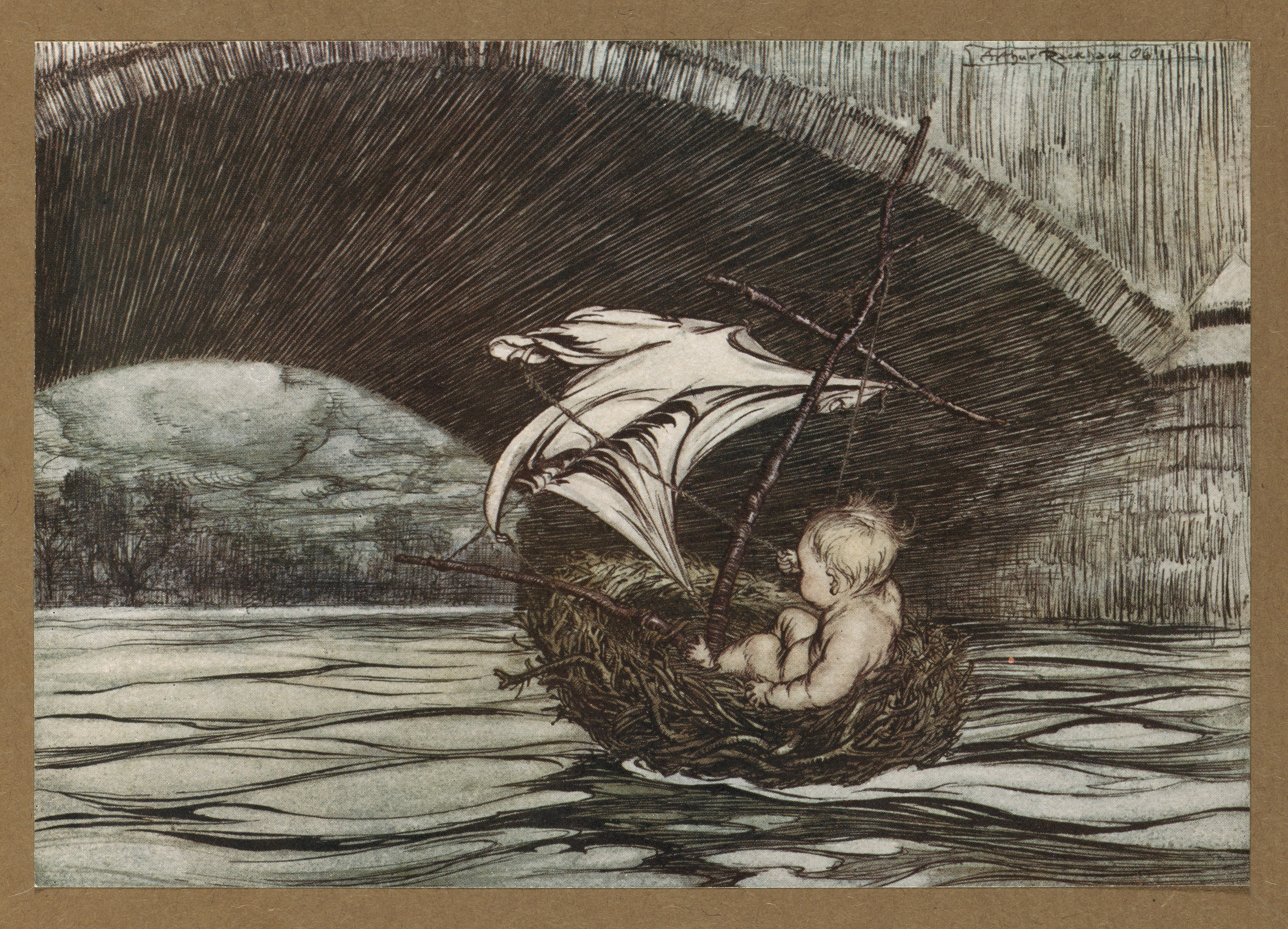
Illustration by Arthur Rackham of Peter in a bird's nest, floating under the bridge

Peter is a seven-day-old infant who, "like all infants", used to be part bird. Peter has complete faith in his flying abilities, so, upon hearing a discussion of his adult life, he is able to escape out of the window of his London home and return to Kensington Gardens. Upon returning to the Gardens, Peter is shocked to learn from the crow Solomon Caw that he is not still a bird, but more like a human – Solomon says he is crossed between them as a "Betwixt-and-Between". Unfortunately, Peter now knows he cannot fly, so he is stranded in Kensington Gardens. At first, Peter can only get around on foot, but he commissions the building of a child-sized thrush's nest that he can use as a boat to navigate the Gardens by way of the Serpentine, the large lake that divides Kensington Gardens from Hyde Park.

Although he terrifies the fairies when he first arrives, Peter quickly gains favour with them. He amuses them with his human ways and agrees to play the panpipes at the fairy dances. Eventually, Queen Mab grants him the wish of his heart, and he decides to return home to his mother. The fairies reluctantly help him to fly home, where he finds his mother is asleep in his old bedroom.

Peter feels rather guilty for leaving his mother, mostly because he believes she misses him terribly. He considers returning to live with her, but first decides to go back to the Gardens to say his last good-byes. Unfortunately, Peter stays too long in the Gardens, and, when he uses his second wish to go home permanently, he is devastated to learn that, in his absence, his mother has given birth to another boy she can love. Peter returns, heartbroken, to Kensington Gardens.

Peter later meets a little girl named Maimie Mannering, who is lost in the Gardens. He and Maimie become fast friends, and little Peter asks her to marry him. Maimie is going to stay with him, but realises that her mother must be missing her dreadfully, so she leaves Peter to return home. Maimie does not forget Peter, however, and when she is older, she makes presents and letters for him. She even gives him an imaginary goat which he rides around every night. Maimie is the literary predecessor to the character Wendy Darling in Barrie's later Peter and Wendy story.

Throughout the novel, Peter misunderstands simple things like children's games. He does not know what a pram is, mistaking it for an animal, and he becomes extremely attached to a boy's lost kite. It is only when Maimie tells him, that he discovers he plays all his games incorrectly. When Peter is not playing, he likes to make graves for the children who get lost at night, burying them with little headstones in the Gardens.

== Related works ==
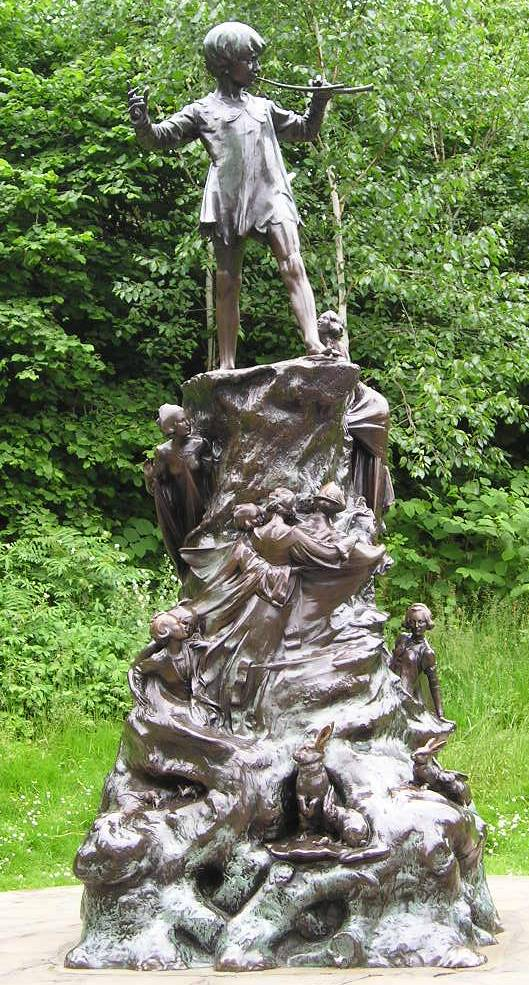
Peter Pan statue in Kensington Gardens, London

Most of the text of Peter Pan in Kensington Gardens was included as chapters 13–18 of Barrie's earlier novel The Little White Bird, published in 1902, with minor differences appearing on only nine pages of the separately published 1906 novel. The Little White Bird was published as a novel for adult readers; whereas Peter Pan in Kensington Gardens was published specifically as a children's book. Scholar Jacqueline Rose perceives, however, that the book is not so much a children's book as one for art collectors thanks to the 1906 edition's illustrations by Arthur Rackham.

In 1904, Barrie wrote a stage play titled Peter Pan, or the Boy Who Would Not Grow Up, performed in December of that year, although it had not yet been published. The play is not a sequel or adaptation of the earlier novel; it is a different story, though closely based on the literary style, subtext concepts, and the Peter Pan character he had developed in The Little White Bird and Peter Pan in Kensington Gardens. In the play and later novel, Peter Pan as a character is portrayed a few years older than the Peter Pan of Kensington Gardens. The stage play became the basis for Barrie's 1911 novel Peter and Wendy (later published under the title Peter Pan and Wendy in 1921, with subsequent publications using the title Peter Pan). The script of the stage play itself was published later in 1928.

== Setting ==
The story is set in Kensington Gardens, one of the London Royal Parks, mostly after "Lock-Out Time", described by Barrie as the time at the end of the day when the park gates are closed to the public. After this time the fairies, and other magical inhabitants of the park, can move about more freely than during the daylight, when they must hide from ordinary people. The fairy inhabitants of the gardens are first described in Thomas Tickell's 1722 poem Kensington Gardens.

== Illustrations and editions ==
Rackham was commissioned to illustrate the book following the success of his work on the 1905 edition of Rip Van Winkle. The owners of the Leicester Galleries, Brown and Phillips, instigated a preliminary meeting between Barrie and Rackham in June 1905, and he was given almost 18 months to complete the illustrations. The first edition was released in both a trade edition and a larger signed limited edition of 500 copies. Both versions contain 50 colour plates and 3 black and white line drawings, which were exhibited at the Leicester Galleries from November 1906.

In 1912 a revised edition containing some reworking and 9 more black and white drawings was published. This impression also differed in that the plates were placed within the text, whereas the 1906 edition placed all the images at the end of the book, after the text.

== Adaptations ==
In 2019, theatre company Betwixt-and-Between brought Peter Pan in Kensington Gardens to Edinburgh Fringe and Moat Brae. The novel was adapted for stage and directed by Charlotte Ellen
