= Belt Up Theatre =

British theatre company

Belt Up Theatre was a British theatre company based in the north of England. Company directors Dominic J Allen, Jethro Compton, James Wilkes and Alexander Wright met whilst attending the University of York. The foursome set up the company in 2008 in the city of York.

The short-lived company entered protracted hiatus in January 2013.

== Productions and major awards ==
- In April 2008, Belt Up Theatre premiered at the National Student Drama Festival, presenting Kafka's Metamorphosis, which attracted high acclaim and several awards.
- Belt Up Theatre made the first of their many visits to the Edinburgh Festival Fringe in August 2008, with a production of "The Red Room". "Its ambition invited your respect - and the talent was there to cement it." Shows featured in "The Red Room" were The Tartuffe, Volpone, The Women of Troy, The Park Keeper and others which collectively won the Edinburgh International Festival Award 2008 for the best work on the Fringe. It also won the ThreeWeeks Editor's Award 2008
- At the 2009 Edinburgh fringe, Belt Up Theatre staged a well-reviewed production of Kafka's The Trial as well as re-staging 'The Tartuffe' in 'The Squat'.
- The Southwark Playhouse in November 2009 staged a double bill of The Trial and James Wilkes' The Tartuffe.
- May 2010 saw a re-staging at the York Theatre Royal of The Tartuffe, described by Charles Hutchinson as "young Monty Python does Moliere".
- At the Edinburgh Festival fringe in August 2010, Belt Up staged a set of eight productions in the C Soco venue, all original compositions or adaptations, called collectively "The House Above". The plays were Metamorphosis, Lorca is Dead, Odyssey, Atrium, Antigone, Quasimodo, The Boy James and Octavia. Three of the plays were transferred to the Southwark Playhouse the following November.
- Following its debut in Edinburgh, The Boy James was revived in the Southwark Playhouse in January 2011, then again at The Goldsmith in Southwark from January to February 2012, and became the company's first production to tour internationally, at the Adelaide Fringe Festival in March 2012 alongside 'Outland'.
- The old vault of Clerkenwell Prison was the location for Belt Up Theatre's site specific production of Shakespeare's Macbeth in April–May 2011. and again in 2012.
- Edinburgh Fringe Festival in 2011 showed Belt Up Theatre's "The Penthouse" which featured a return of The Boy James, Outland, Twenty Minutes to Nine .
- Belt Up Theatre presented two showings of Outland in the University Women's Club in Mayfair. in July 2012.
- At the 2012 Edinburgh Festival Fringe, Belt Up returned with The Boy James and Outland, as well as a world premiere of A Little Princess, an adaptation of Frances Hodgson Burnett's children's fiction novel.

== Other awards ==
NSDF FestGoer's Award for Metamorphosis

NSDF Buzz Goodbody Award for best Director for Alexander Wright for Metamorphosis

NSDF Spotlight Award for Best Actor for James Wilkes as Gregor Samsa in Metamorphosis

NSDF Judges' Award for Best Lighting Design for Jethro Compton for Metamorphosis

NSDF Judges' Award for Best Ensemble for Metamorphosis

== Residency at York Theatre Royal ==
In autumn 2009, Belt Up Theatre were announced as a resident company at the York Theatre Royal
