= Holy Trinity Church, Leamington Spa =

Coordinates: 52°17′41.35″N 01°32′11.81″W

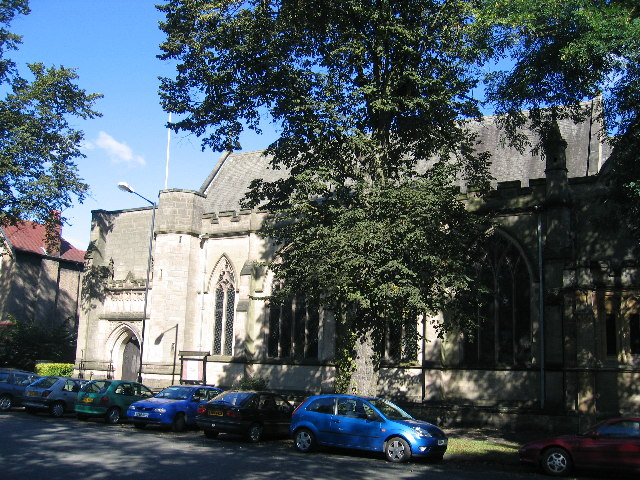
- Holy Trinity Church, Leamington Spa
- Holy Trinity Church, Leamington Spa
- Denomination: Church of England
- Churchmanship: Central

History
- Dedication: Holy Trinity

Administration
- Province: Canterbury
- Diocese: Coventry
- Parish: Leamington Spa

Holy Trinity Church, Leamington Spa is a Grade II listed parish church in Leamington Spa, England.

== History ==
Holy Trinity Church was started in 1825 as a daughter church of All Saints' Church and opened in 1847. It was designed by Mitchell of Leamington Spa, to the commission of Revd John Craig, vicar of All Saints.

It was enlarged in 1865, and more work took place in 1881 when the transepts were enlarged and a vestry was provided by John Cundall.

A parish was formed in 1899.

The porch and east chancel wall date from 1900, and there were further alterations just before the First World War.

== Organ ==
The church has a large four-manual pipe organ which dates from 1880. Originally by Forster and Andrews the organ has been rebuilt and restored many times. A specification of the organ can be found on the National Pipe Organ Register.

=== Organists ===
- 1939 - 1949 Stanley Vann
- Martindale Sidwell temporary organist during the war
- 1949 - 1956 Harold Dexter
- 1956 - 1957 Peter Hurford
- John Cooper
- Frank Antony Ernest Randle
- Adrian Moore
- 2021–present Kerry Beaumont
