= Satchwell =

Satchwell is a surname. Notable people with the surname include:

- Benjamin Satchwell (1732–1810), British philanthropist
- Brooke Satchwell (born 1980), Australian actress, model, and environmental spokeswoman
- Kathleen Satchwell, South African judge
- Kevin Satchwell (born 1951), British educator
- Tina Satchwell (1972–2017), Irish woman who was murdered by her husband
