= Harold Dexter =

British organist and professor

Harold Dexter (7 October 1920 - 27 June 2000) was a British organist, Professor at the Guildhall School of Music and Drama (Head of General Musicianship Department, 1962–85). He was educated at Wyggeston Grammar School for Boys, Leicester and Corpus Christi College, Cambridge.

== Appointments ==
- 1946 -1949 Organist of St. James’ Church, Louth St James' Church, Louth
- 1949 - 1956 Organist of Holy Trinity Church, Leamington Spa
- 1956 - 1968 Organist of Southwark Cathedral

Cultural offices
Preceded by Sidney Campbell	Organist and Master of the Choristers of Southwark Cathedral; 1956–1968	Succeeded by Ernest Warrell
