= Craig telescope =

1850s telescope near London, England

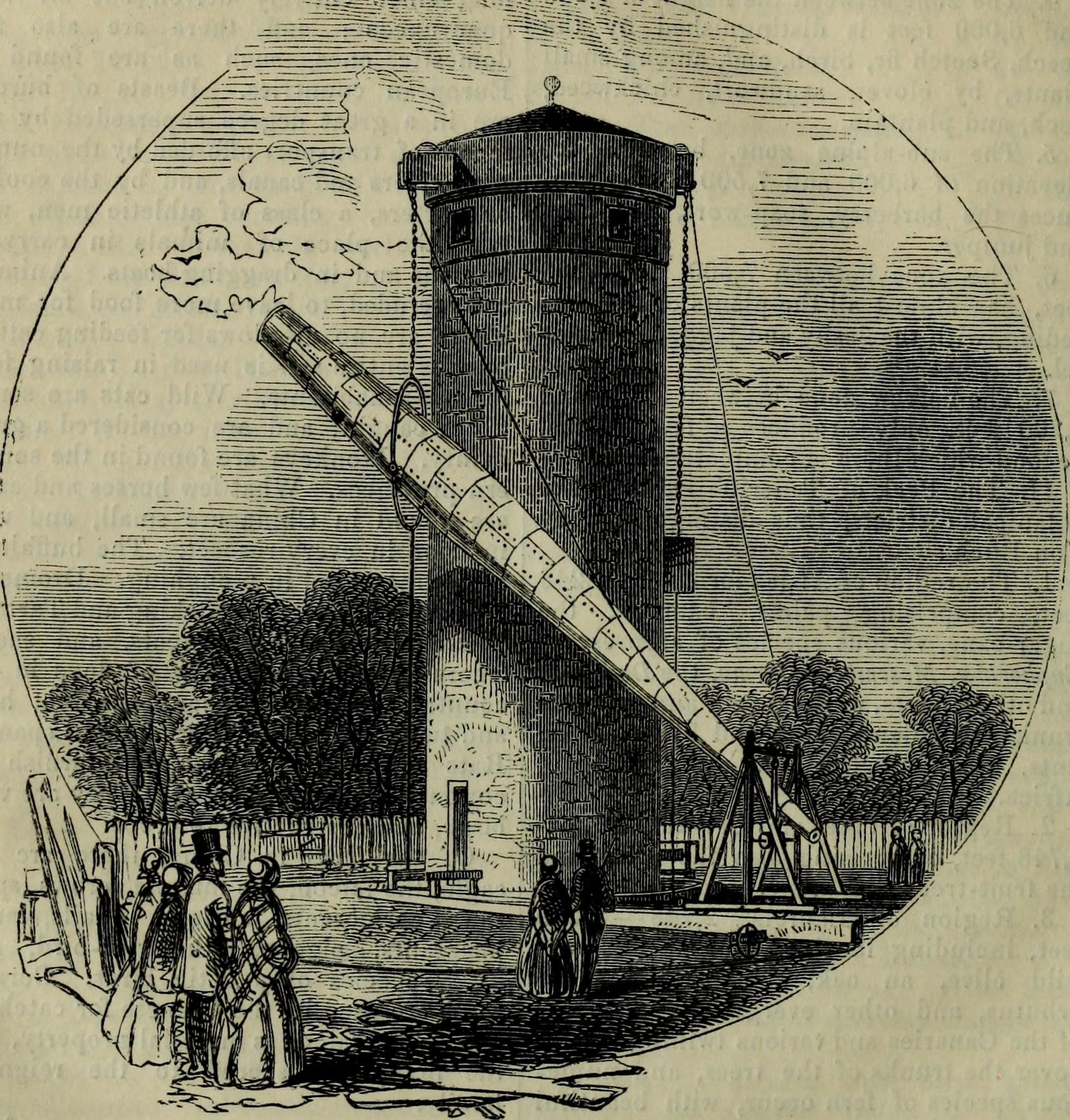
- An illustration of the Craig Telescope
- Location: Wandsworth Common, London Borough of Wandsworth, Greater London, London, England
- Diameter: 61 cm (2 ft 0 in)
- Website: www.craig-telescope.co.uk
- Related media on Commons

The Craig telescope was a large telescope built in the 1850s, and while much larger than previous refracting telescopes, it had some problems that hampered its use. Its unique design and potential caused a great deal of excitement in its day.

The telescope was ready in August 1852 and was visited by William Parsons, 3rd Earl of Rosse, famous for the Leviathan of Parsonstown, a reflecting telescope and the largest telescope of this age with a six-foot mirror.

== Telescope ==
It was the largest refracting telescope (a telescope with a lens) in the world from 1852 to 1857, erected in south London, England. It was a great refractor, a large refracting telescope with an achromatic doublet with an aperture of 61 cm (2 feet or 24 inches) and was completed in 1852 on Wandsworth Common and dismantled around 1857 (although the brick tower probably survived until 1870). It had a focal length of 76–83 feet.

It was named after the Reverend John Craig, who spent a small fortune on it, producing a uniquely designed telescope with nearly double the aperture of the next largest refracting telescopes, making it the largest refracting telescope in the world for the better part of a decade. However, it had a problem with its lens figuring starting from its first light in the summer of 1852. It soon fell into disuse as that same year Craig lost his only son, then his wife in 1854, and lost his brother and was put in jail for 6 weeks in 1856.

Craig did not have the lens refigured and the telescope struggled to achieve his modest goals, which included observations of Earth's Moon and Saturn. It was eventually demolished and Craig moved on to other projects, including opening one of the first indoor skating rinks.

The doublet was made with flint glass by Chance Brothers and a plate glass by Thames Plate Glass Company. The mounting was designed by William Gravatt, and featured a 19.5-meter-tall (64 ft) brick tower with a 24.5 m-long (80 ft) cigar-shaped telescope tube (built by Messrs Rennie) slung from the side.

The next largest refractors were two 15-inch (38 cm) refractors built by Merz and Mahler of Munich (München) (Joseph Fraunhofer's firm), one at Pulkovo Observatory in Europe and one at Harvard College Observatory in America. The largest telescope at the time was in Ireland, a 6-foot-aperture (183 cm) metal mirror by William Parsons, 3rd Earl of Rosse. (see "Leviathan of Parsonstown")

One of the goals for the telescope was to look for a possible moon of Venus and to confirm the third (Crepe) ring of Saturn. Some of the reported issues were with the overall lens quality and troubles in the personal life of Craig.

== See also ==
- List of largest optical telescopes in the 19th century
- Leviathan of Parsonstown (72 inches aperture metal mirror)
- List of largest optical telescopes in the British Isles
