= St John-at-Hampstead =

- Parish Church of St. John the Evangelist, Hampstead
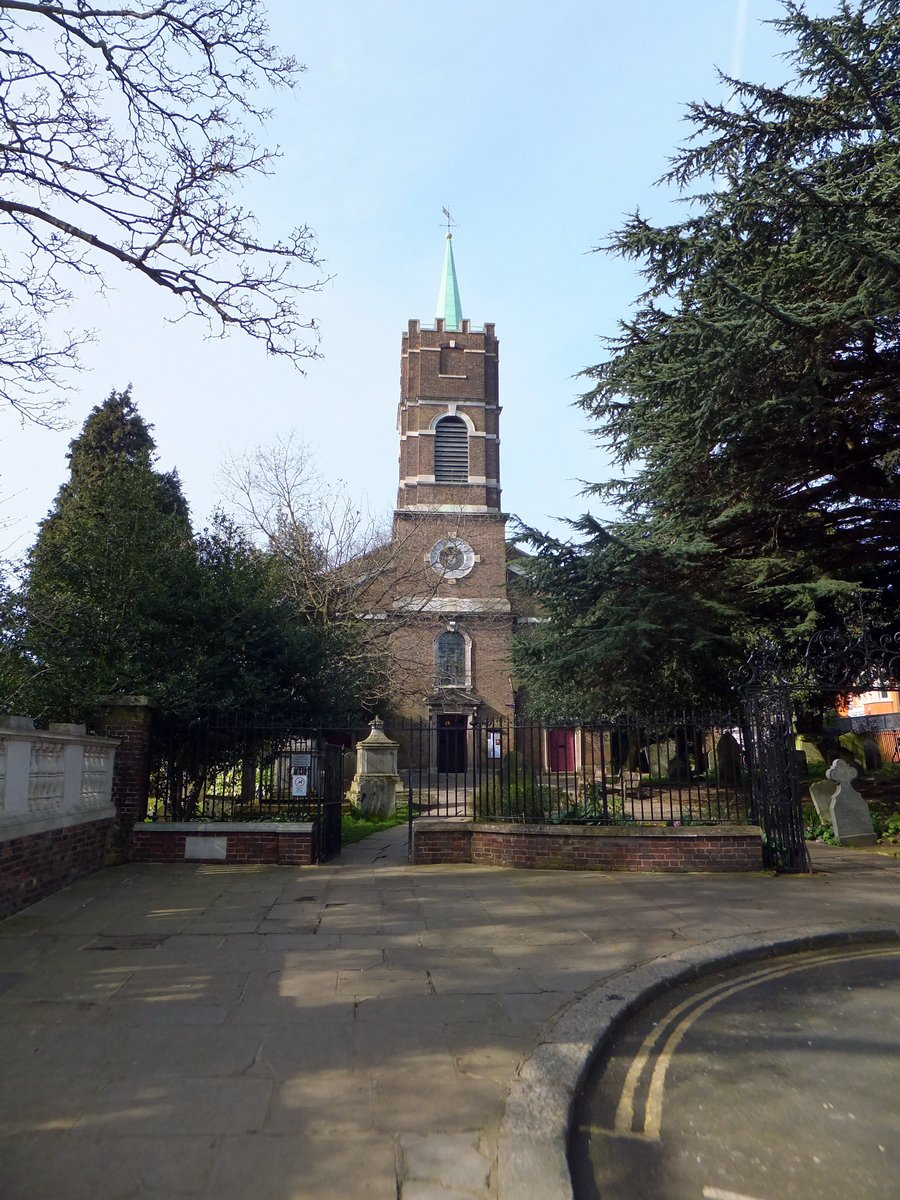
- Exterior from Church Row
- St John-at-Hampstead
- 51°33′19″N 00°10′53″W
- OS grid reference: TQ 26190 85615
- Location: Church Row, Hampstead, London NW3
- Country: England
- Denomination: Church of England
- Churchmanship: Broad Church/Liberal Anglo-Catholic
- Website: hampsteadparishchurch.org.uk

History
- Dedication: St John the Evangelist

Architecture
- Heritage designation: Grade I listed
- Designated: 11 August 1950
- Architect(s): Henry Flitcroft; John Sanderson; Robert Hesketh; F. P. Cockerell; Temple Moore
- Style: Classical
- Completed: 1747

Administration
- Diocese: Diocese of London
- Parish: Hampstead

St John-at-Hampstead is an Anglican parish church dedicated to St John the Evangelist in Church Row, Hampstead, London. The parish stands within the London Borough of Camden and forms part of the Diocese of London.

== History ==
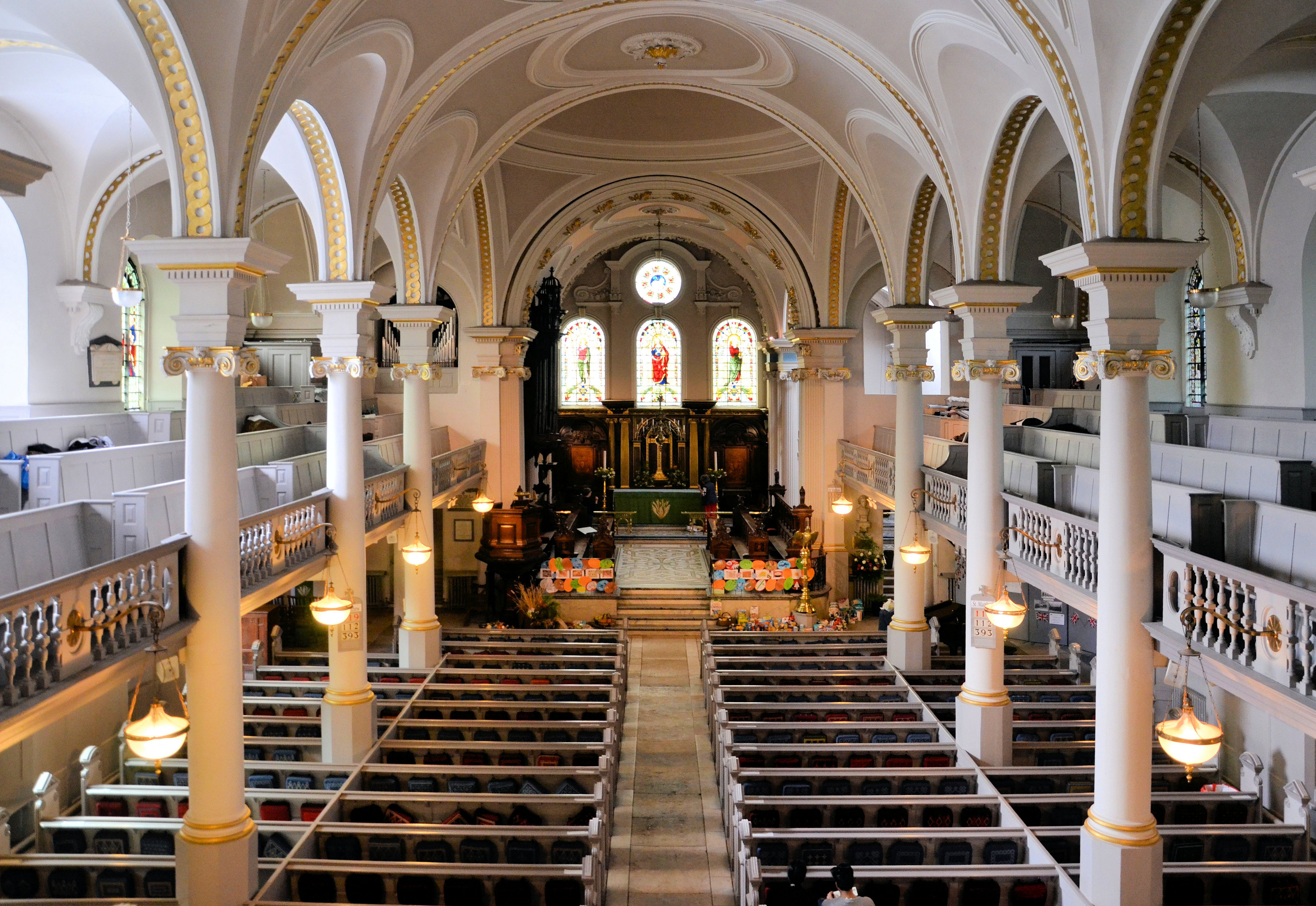
St John-at-Hampstead - Church interior

The land of the Parish of St John-at-Hampstead was granted to the Benedictine monks of Westminster Abbey by charter in 986, a document of uncertain authenticity but traditionally accepted as confirming earlier grants made under King Æthelred and later reaffirmed by Edward the Confessor. While it is unlikely that the monks established a substantial parish church at this early date, they would have required a chapel for the daily offices of their order. On this basis, the site of the current parish church has long been regarded as having been a place of Christian worship for over a millennium, a milestone commemorated by the parish in 1986.

The first clear documentary evidence of a church dates from the early 14th century. In 1312, John de Neuport is recorded as priest, and in 1333 reference is made to a chapel dedicated to the Blessed Virgin Mary. At the Dissolution of the Monasteries in the 16th century, the Benedictine foundation of Westminster was replaced by the short-lived Bishopric of Westminster. Its first and only bishop, Thomas Thirlby, was also rector of Hampstead and in 1545 appointed Thomas Chapelyne as vicar. When the see was suppressed in 1551 under Edward VI, the manor and benefice of Hampstead were granted to Sir Thomas Wrothe. Parish records survive continuously from 1560.

The medieval and early post-Reformation church was a modest structure, partly of stone and partly of timber, with a small wooden tower. As Hampstead grew in population and reputation during the 17th and early 18th centuries—particularly as a health resort associated with the nearby wells—the building became increasingly inadequate and unsafe. By 1744 it was declared unusable.

A new church was erected on the present site and consecrated on 8 October 1747 by the Bishop of Llandaff, acting as commissary of the diocese. After initial disputes, the trustees adopted a design by John Sanderson, following the withdrawal of Henry Flitcroft. The building was financed by a combination of contributions from the lord of the manor, public subscription, pew rents and other local sources. The church was considerably smaller than today, essentially a rectangular structure extending only as far as the transepts, with a tower at the east end. The copper spire was added later, around 1783. Although dedicated to St John, the precise dedication was not formally specified at the time.

By the early 19th century the church was again too small for the expanding parish. After delays and rejected proposals, plans by Robert Hesketh were approved in 1843, extending the building some 30 feet westwards by means of transepts and adding over 500 seats. Gas lighting was installed, and in 1853 a new organ was built by Henry Willis, who served for a time as organist.

Further proposals for improvement in the 1870s initially included demolition of the tower, provoking strong opposition from prominent figures in artistic and literary circles – those in their number included: William Morris, Edward Burne-Jones, Holman Hunt, Ford Madox Brown, Anthony Trollope, George du Maurier, Coventry Patmore, F. T. Palgrave and others. As a result, the scheme was revised, and instead the church was extended westwards in 1877–78 to designs by F. P. Cockerell. This phase of rebuilding was consecrated in 1878.

In 1911–12, the vestries were remodelled by Temple Moore, who also added a Morning Chapel (now the Sacrament Chapel), dedicated to St Mary and St John. In 1917 the Bishop of London formally declared the church to be dedicated to St John the Evangelist – an official dedication which clarified the uncertainty of the 18th century. In 1958 the dark Victorian interior decoration was removed and the lighter, whitewashed scheme closer to the original appearance was reinstated. As certified in 1950, the church is now a Grade I listed building.

== Architecture ==
The church is constructed of yellow stock brick with stone dressings and is designed in a plain Classical style. Its plan consists of a six-bay nave with aisles, a sanctuary, and an east-end tower surmounted by a spire. The building also closes the western perspective of Church Row.

The principal entrance is located at the base of the east tower and features a moulded stone doorcase with a console-bracketed pediment, beneath which is a plaque dated 1745 reused from the former west end. The doorway has an overlight and panelled doors. Additional entrances flank the tower, each with moulded stone doorcases, cornices, and panelled doors. At first-floor level, the tower façade contains three round-arched, architraved windows with keystones, lugs, bracketed sills, and small-paned glazing. A stone dentil cornice surmounts the tower and continues across the aisle gable, rising to form a pediment. Above this, the tower incorporates a circular lugged clock and round-arched belfry openings with architraved heads, keystones, and continuous impost and sill bands. It is crowned by a battlemented parapet and a spire with a weathervane. The aisles are lit by similar round-arched windows, while the west end has three comparable windows with an oculus above the central one.

The cast iron gates and railings surrounding the old churchward came from Cannons, the Duke of Chandos’ home. 59 feet (18 m) of railings and two 9-foot (2.7 m) gates were purchased at a cost of £62 17s. 0d. and altered to fit the front of the church.

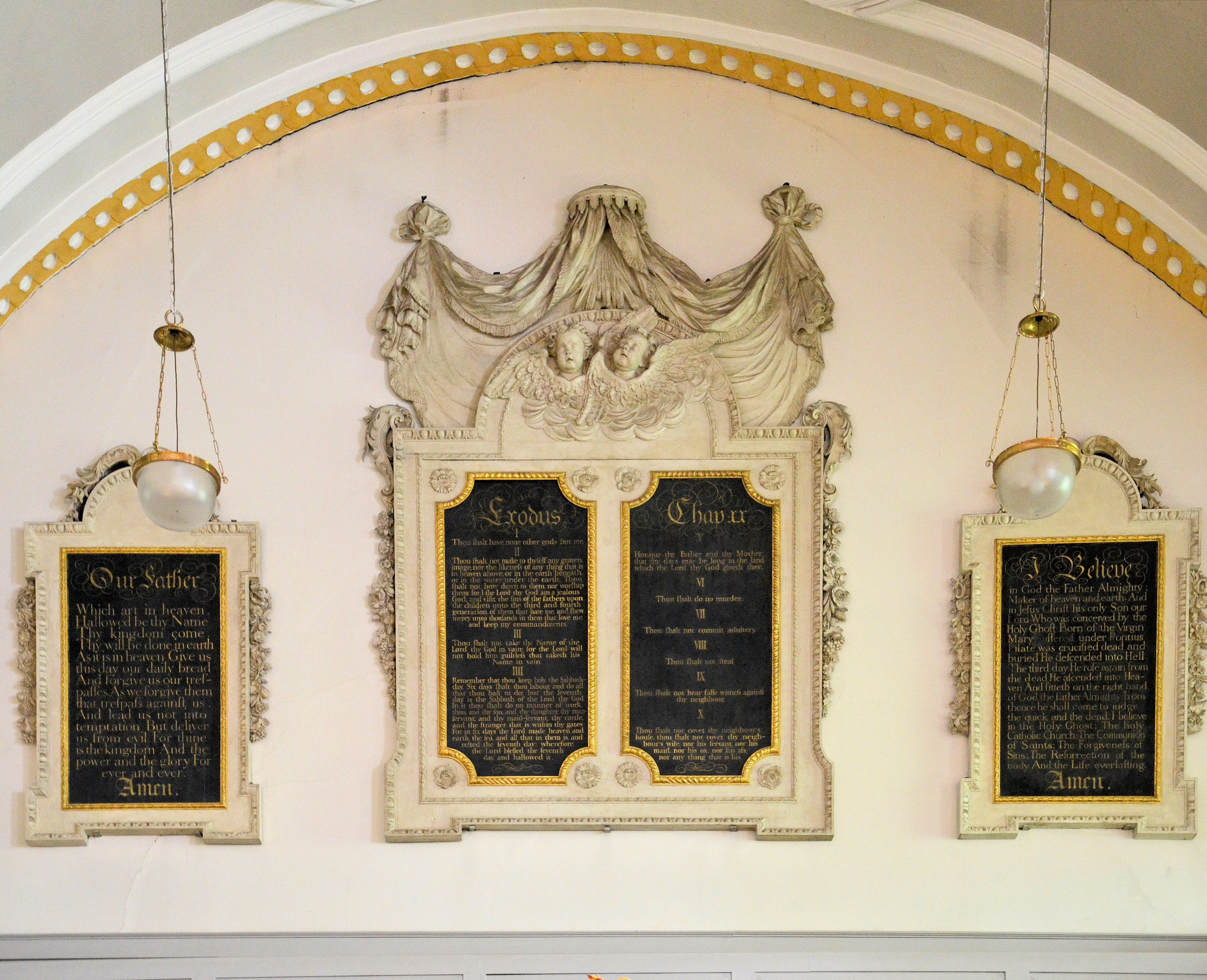
The Commandment boards, Our Father & Creed at St John-at-Hampstead

The interior is articulated by tall, unfluted Ionic columns supporting arches that intersect the tunnel-vaulted ceiling, with galleries occupying the bays between the columns. The north-western Chapel of St Mary and St John, created in 1912, is domed and illuminated by a circular lantern. Chancel decoration dating from around 1883 was executed by T. G. Jackson, who designed the pavement, the Willis organ case, inlaid choir stalls, panelling, chandelier, and railings, along with an extensive intertwined double-gold decorative scheme that extends across much of the church. The east end of the church on the rear gallery wall holds The Commandment Boards carved by Thomas Ady for the new church. They were restored in 1979, having been concealed for many years under paintings. They are described as some of the best in England.

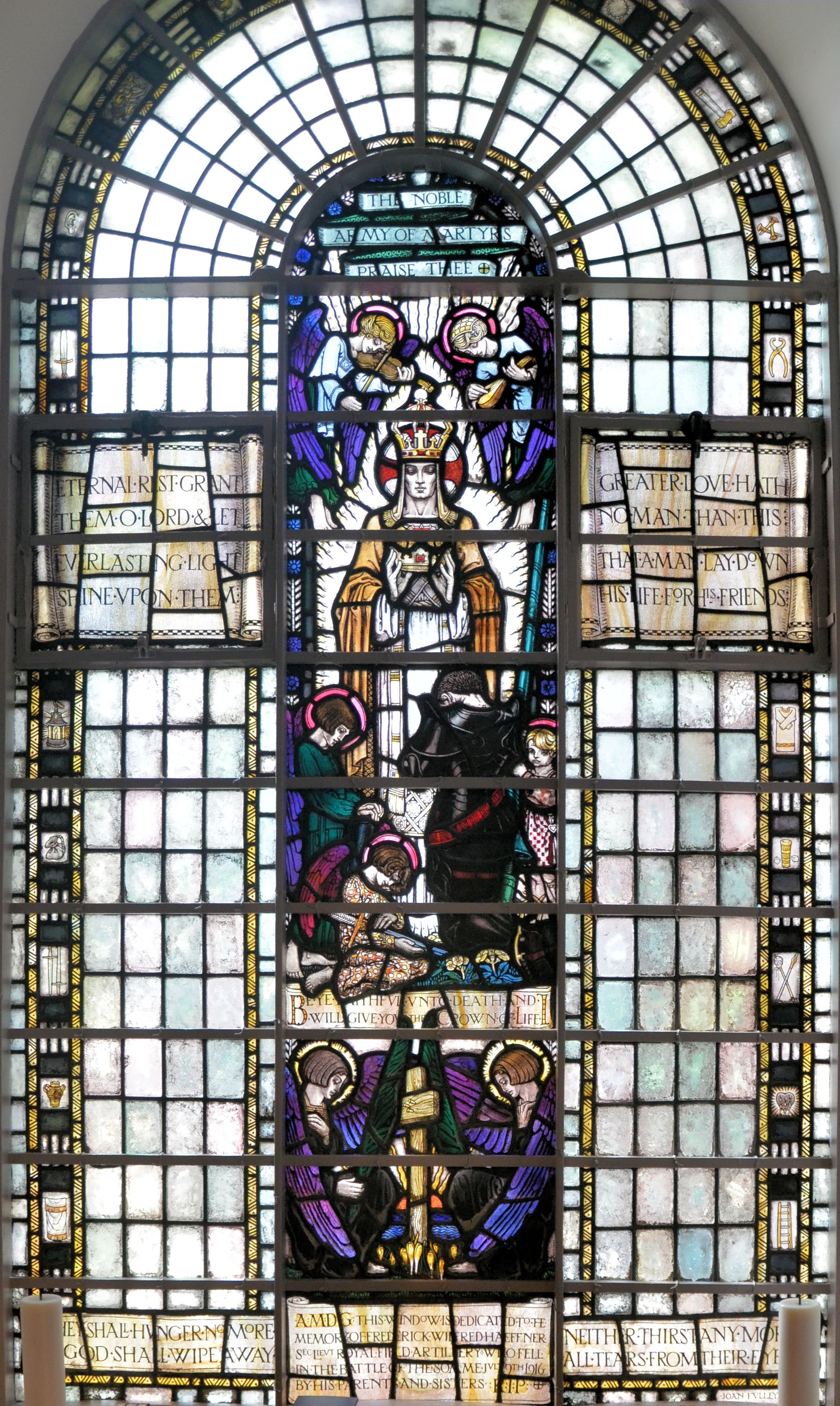
St John-at-Hampstead - Fulleylove window

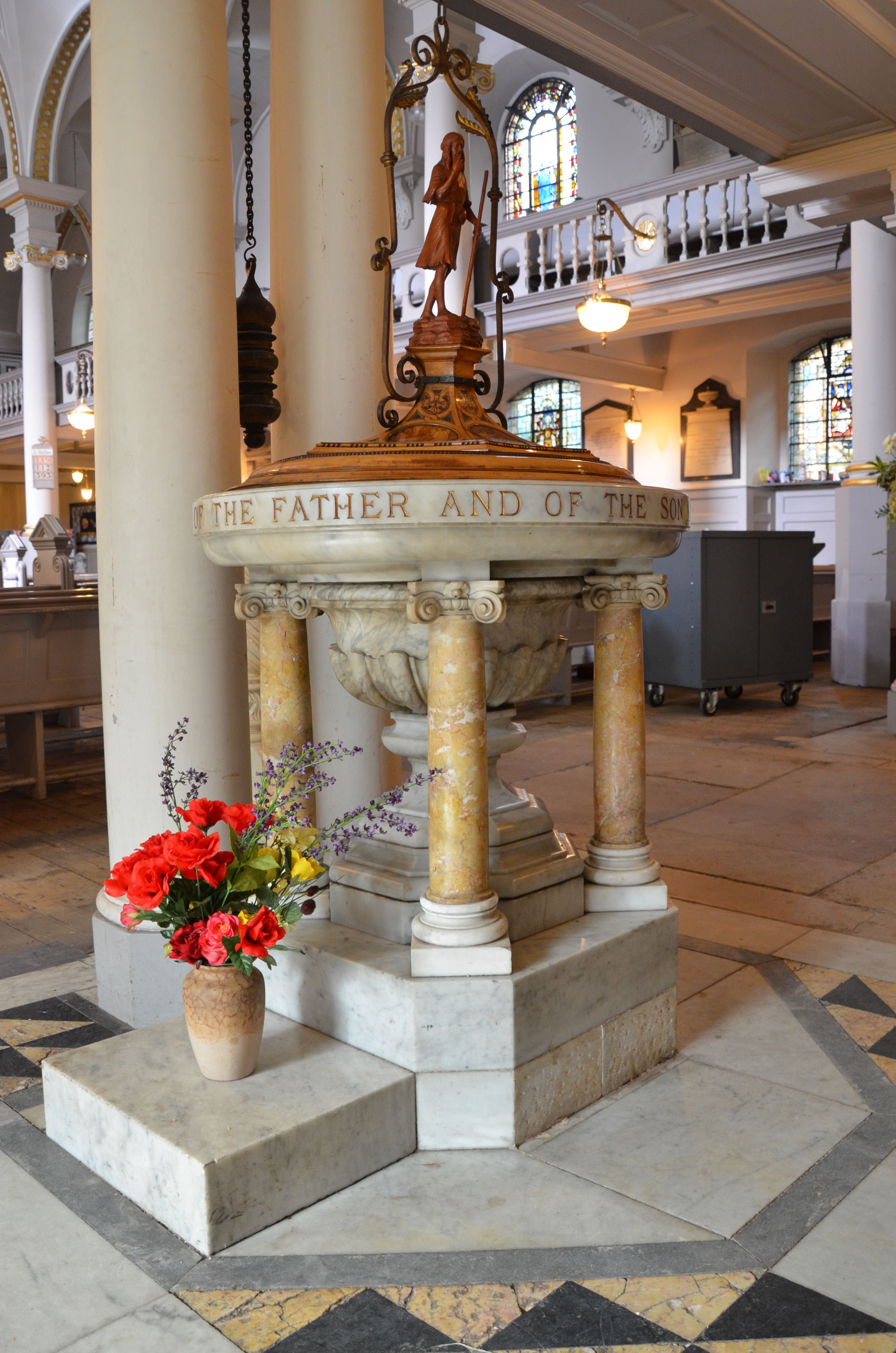
The font at St John-at-Hampstead

The stained glass in the west windows was designed by Professor Ellis Wooldridge and executed by Powell. Much of the remaining stained glass was designed, executed, and donated by Alfred Bell of Clayton & Bell, who also designed the marble font supported by Ionic columns. The font incorporates the bowl of the 1745 font, the stem being removed to form the piscina in the chapel. A gallery window dedicated to Sir George Gilbert Scott, Bell’s tutor, is also his work. The Lady Chapel window is by Joan Fulleylove and is dedicated to a soldier of the 1st World War. Fulleylove studied at The Slade between 1907 and 1908; it is said to be her first window. The mid-eighteenth-century pulpit was reduced to its present size during F. P. Cockerell’s reordering in 1878.

The church contains numerous memorials, including monuments to the Revd Thomas Ainger by Sir George Gilbert Scott, as well as to John Keats, Joanna Baillie, J. H. Merivale, Frances Erskine, T. N. Longman, Henry Cort, and others. The oldest surviving tomb is that of James Rixton, who was buried in the earlier church in 1658.

The large prie-deux in the chapel were given in memory of Mildred Aline Bell who died on the Matterhorn in 1901 and who is buried in the Churchyard.

== Music ==
The church has a musical tradition stretching back as far as Henry Willis. Under the direction of Martindale Sidwell it developed a national and international reputation as being a centre for parish music, which it maintains today with a professional choir as well as a junior choir and high-profile concerts.

=== Organ ===
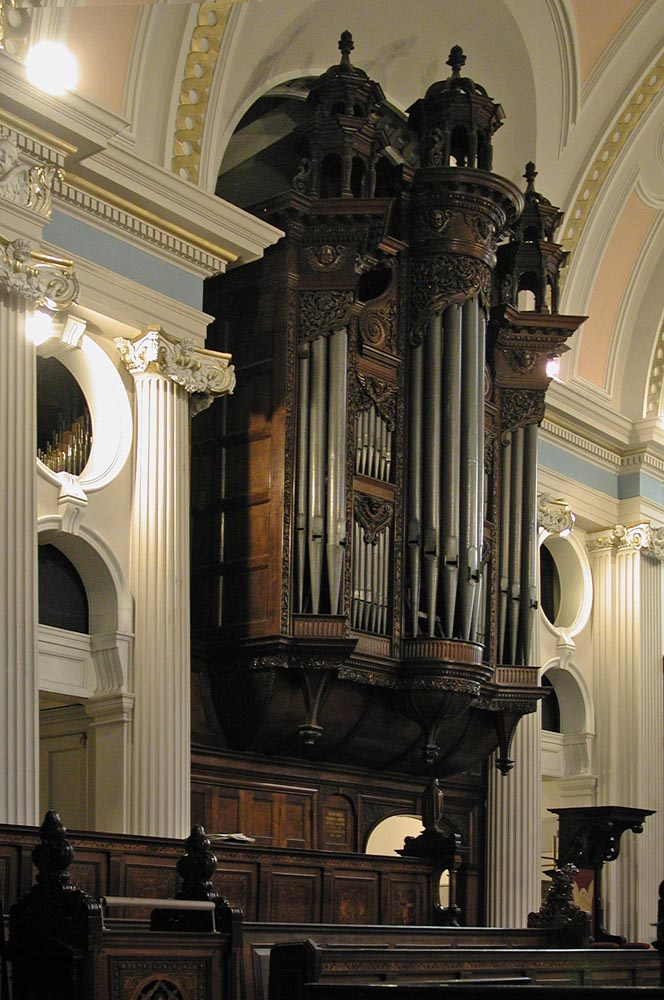
The Willis organ at St John-at-Hampstead

The early records of organs date from the middle of the 18th century. The current organ was installed by Henry Willis in 1884. Restoration and rebuilding work was undertaken by Harrison and Harrison in 1964, and Bower and Co in 2000. A specification of the organ can be found on the National Pipe Organ Register and on the parish website.

=== Organists ===
- Samuel Reay 1854–56
- James Shaw 1874–95
- George Aitken 1894–1942
- Martindale Sidwell 1947–92
- Simon Lawford 1993–94
- Lee Ward 1994–2012
- James Sherlock 2012–2017
- Peter Foggitt 2018–2021
- Geoffrey Webber 2021–present

== Voluntary rate ==
By virtue of the Parochial Church Councils (Powers) Measure 1956, parochial church councils are entitled to levy a voluntary rate and, in 1986, Hampstead Parish Church's PCC decided to supplement their millennium redecoration appeal by this means. The levying of a voluntary rate on businesses and residents alike has now become a regular annual event.

== Churchyard ==
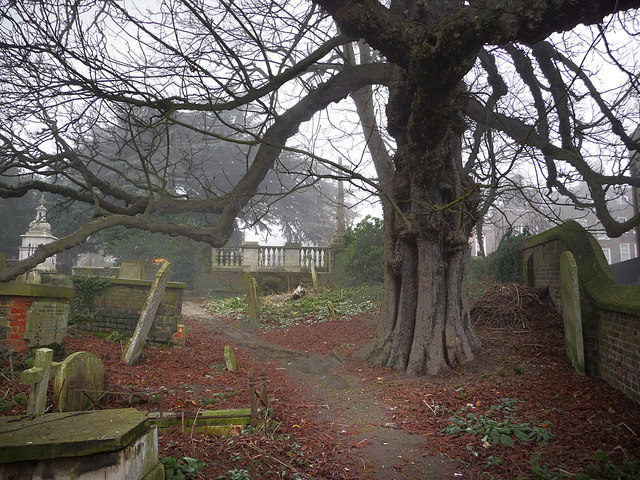
Churchyard

Notable individuals buried in its churchyard include:

- Eliza Acton, food writer
- George Atherton Aitken, author and biographer
- Herbert Beerbohm Tree, actor and theatre-manager
- Walter Besant, novelist and historian
- Alfred Brendel, pianist
- John Constable, romantic painter
- Elizabeth Rundle Charles, author
- Peter Cook, writer and comedian
- Henry Cort, ironmaster and inventor
- Eleanor Farjeon, author
- Penelope Fitzgerald, author, daughter of E.V. Knox
- Hugh Gaitskell, Labour Party leader from 1955 until 1963
- Dora Gaitskell, Baroness Gaitskell, widow of Hugh and Labour life peer
- Eva Gore-Booth and Esther Roper, suffragists and social justice campaigners
- John Harrison, inventor of the marine chronometer
- C. E. M. Joad, philosopher
- Kay Kendall, actress, film star of the 1950s
- E.V. Knox, poet and satirist, editor of Punch (1932–1949)
- Mary Knox (née Shepard), illustrator of P.L. Travers' Mary Poppins stories, daughter of E.H. Shepard, wife of E.V. Knox
- Arthur Llewelyn Davies and his wife Sylvia (née du Maurier) who befriended J M Barrie and whose children inspired Peter Pan
- Jack and Peter Llewelyn Davies (children of the above) in the same grave as their parents and their brother Michael, in a separate grave
- John Llewelyn Davies, preacher and theologian, father of Arthur Llewelyn Davies and Margaret Llewelyn Davies
- George du Maurier, author and cartoonist, father of Gerald du Maurier and Sylvia Llewelyn Davies
- Gerald du Maurier, actor and manager, father of Daphne du Maurier, novelist, and brother of Sylvia Llewelyn Davies
- Temple Moore, architect
- Nicholas Parsons, actor and radio and television presenter
- Langford Reed, scriptwriter and director
- George Gilbert Scott Jr., architect working in late Gothic and Queen Anne revival styles, eldest son of Sir George Gilbert Scott, father of Sir Giles Gilbert Scott and Adrian Gilbert Scott, all also architects
- Richard Norman Shaw, Architect
- Evelyn Underhill, Anglo-Catholic writer
- Anton Walbrook, Austrian actor
- Alec Waugh, writer, brother of Evelyn Waugh

The churchyard contains eight war graves, comprising six servicemen from World War I and two from World War II.

== See also ==
- List of church restorations and alterations by Temple Moore
