= William Abbotts =

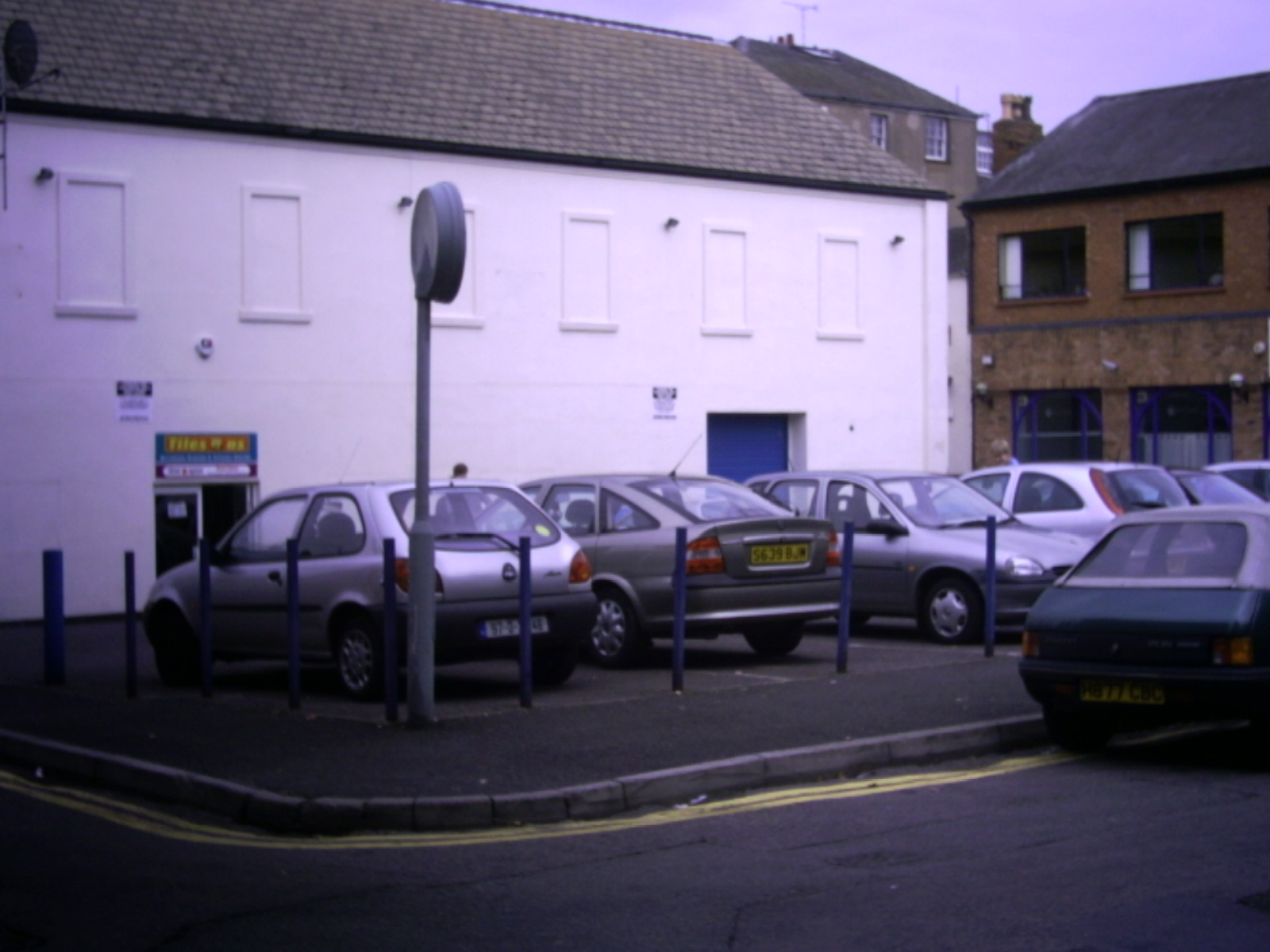
The site of the well discovered by Abbotts and Satchwell, now a carpark.

William Abbotts (1736 – 1 March 1805) was one of the founding fathers of Leamington Spa in Warwickshire, UK.

Although already an important landowner in the then village it was on 14 January 1784 that Abbotts made the discovery that he would be remembered for. Up until that date there was only one known spring in Leamington and that was on land belonging to the 4th Earl of Aylesford who refused to sell the water (which was used for bathing and medicinal purposes), instead allowing people to have it for free. That year however Abbotts and his friend Benjamin Satchwell found a second spring on Abbotts' land. In the manner of the time its supposed medicinal qualities were used to make money from the leisured classes. Abbotts' "Original" Baths, the first commercial baths in the town, were opened in 1786.

After Satchwell and Abbotts' spring was found several wells were bored and draw water. Leamington quickly grew into on the most fashionable spa resorts of the 19th century, a process which turned it from a sleepy village to a thriving town. Abbotts and his wife ran at least two pubs in the town The Black Dog and The New Inn (the latter being built in 1790 to cope with the already growing tourist trade in Leamington which filled The Black Dog and other guest houses).

Abbotts had at least one daughter who was born in 1765 or 1766. After his death in 1805 he buried in the Leamington parish church, All Saints, and four years later Satchwell was buried close by. Abbotts Street in the town is, unsurprisingly, named after him and is located close to the site of the original Leamington spring.
