= Martindale Sidwell =

English organist, composer and teacher

Professor Martindale Sidwell FRCO (23 February 1916 – 20 February 1998) was an English organist, composer and teacher.

== Life ==
John William Martindale Sidwell was born in Little Packington, Warwickshire on 23 February 1916, the son of John William Sidwell, a musician, and Mary Martindale. At the age of seven, he joined the choir at Wells Cathedral, and later became assistant organist. He was awarded ARCO in 1936 and FRCO in 1938.

During the Second World War he served firstly with the North Somerset Yeomanry and later with the Royal Engineers. Invalided out he became temporary organist at Holy Trinity Church, Leamington Spa and director of music at Warwick School.

Sidwell studied at the Royal Academy of Music with C.H. Trevor. He composed one piece which remained unpublished in his lifetime, a Festal Jubilate for choir and organ. A number of Anglican chants by him are still in the repertoire of some Cathedrals and major churches. He was one of the editors of Secular and Sacred Music published in 1966.

In 1944 he married Barbara Hill, a pianist and harpsichordist. He died on 20 February 1998 in London.

== Appointments ==
- Sub Organist at Wells Cathedral 1932 - ?
- Assistant Organist at Wells Cathedral 1938 - ?
- Temporary Organist at Holy Trinity Church, Leamington Spa
- Conductor of the Leamington Spa Choral Society
- Organist of St John-at-Hampstead 1946 - 1992
- Organist of St Clement Danes 1957 - 1992
- Conductor of the London Bach Orchestra 1967 - 1981
- Conductor of Hampstead Choral Society 1946 - 1981
- Conductor of the Martindale Sidwell Singers 1956 - 1992
- Organ tutor at Trinity College of Music and Professor of Organ at the Royal Academy of Music 1963 -1984
- Professor at the Royal School of Church Music 1958 - 1966
