= Simon Preston =

English organist, conductor and composer (1938–2022)

- Born: Simon John Preston; 4 August 1938; Bournemouth, Dorset, England
- Died: 13 May 2022 (aged 83); Littlemore, Oxfordshire, England
- Occupations: Organist, conductor, composer
- Years active: 1958–2020
- Awards: Most Excellent Order of the British Empire CBE

Simon John Preston CBE (4 August 1938 – 13 May 2022) was an English organist, conductor and composer who was regarded as one of the most important English church musicians of his generation.

== Background ==
Simon John Preston was born in Bournemouth, Dorset, England on 4 August 1938, to John Preston, an architectural draughtsman, and Doreen Lane. He was introduced to music at an early age. His uncle played the organ at the church that his family attended, and he was inspired to take up the instrument at the age of 5 after hearing a recording of George Thalben-Ball.

He attended Canford School in Wimborne, Dorset and was a chorister at King's College, Cambridge, where he sang as a treble. He approached the college's music director, Boris Ord, for organ lessons but was referred to Hugh McLean. He later studied under Caleb Henry Trevor at the Royal Academy of Music before returning to King's College as organ scholar under David Willcocks. He first came to attention when he accompanied the college choir at the service of Nine Lessons and Carols on Christmas Eve in 1958.

In 2012 he married Elizabeth Hays. In later life Preston suffered from Alzheimer's disease. Admired as "one of the most important English church musicians of his generation", he died at a care home in Littlemore, Oxfordshire, on 13 May 2022, aged 83.

== Career and legacy ==
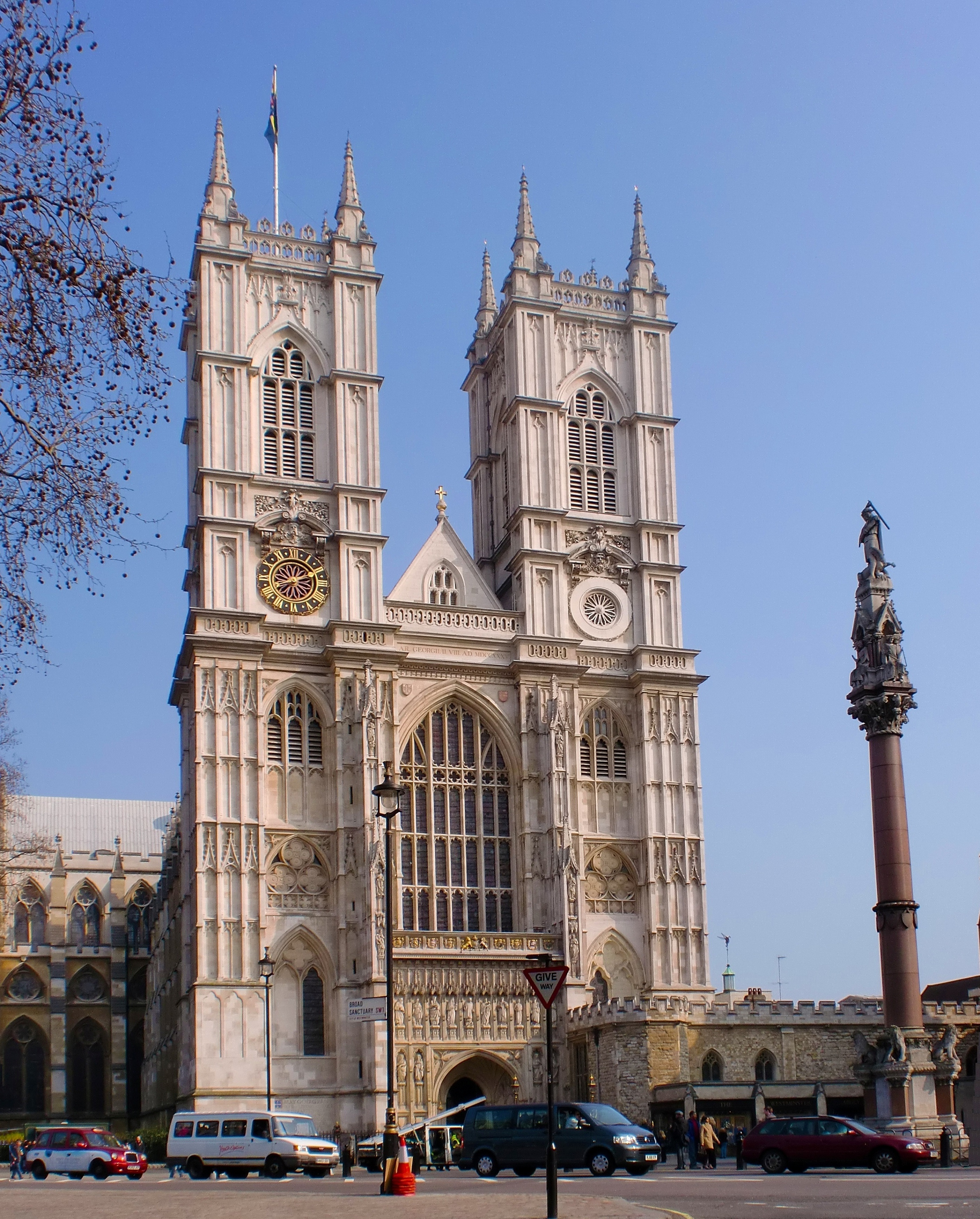
Westminster Abbey in London, where Preston served as sub-organist in the 1960s and organist in the 1980s.

Preston was sub-organist of Westminster Abbey from 1962 to 1967 and, after a brief period covering for Peter Hurford at St Albans Cathedral in 1968, became organist of Christ Church, Oxford, in 1970, where he also lectured. In 1981 he returned to Westminster Abbey, serving as Organist and Master of the Choristers until 1987. During that time he was responsible for the music at the wedding of Prince Andrew and Sarah Ferguson in 1986.

Preston left Westminster Abbey in 1987 to pursue a career as an international concert organist.

He was artistic director of the Calgary International Organ Festival from 1990 to 2002, patron of the University of Buckingham, chair of the Herbert Howells Society and vice-president of both the Organ Club and the Organists’ Benevolent League. He also served as a member of the Arts Council music panel and the music committee of the BBC.

== Compositions and recordings ==
From the 1960s onwards, Preston composed a number of works for the organ, the best-known of which is probably his Alleluyas, written in 1965 in the style of Olivier Messiaen. Recordings of his organ works originally made in the 1960s on the Argo label were re-issued by Eloquence in November 2017.

In 1965, for the Edington Music Festival, he commissioned a setting of verses 73–104 of Psalm 119, and in 1966 he composed a set of five anthems. The following year he wrote a Missa Brevis (short mass service) for the Edington Music Festival, and in 1968 he wrote a Magnificat and a Nunc Dimittis for the same festival.

External audio
- Simon Preston performing Johann Sebastian Bach's Trio Sonatas BWV 525–530 in 1993 Here on Archive.org
- Simon Preston with the Yehudi Menuhin Festival Orchestra performing Georg Friedrich Handel's Organ Concerto: No. 4 in F major, Op. 4. No. 4 No. 5 in F major, Op. 4, No. 5 No. 6 in B flat major, Op. 4, No. 6 No. 13 in F major "Cuckoo and the Nightingale" Here on archive.org

Preston made over 100 recordings, beginning in the early 1960s. His recordings include the complete organ works of Johann Sebastian Bach and the Organ Symphony (Symphony No. 3) by Camille Saint-Saëns, with James Levine conducting the Berlin Philharmonic Orchestra, both for Deutsche Grammophon. He recorded George Frideric Handel's complete organ concertos twice: with Yehudi Menuhin conducting the Bath Festival Orchestra and later on period instruments with Trevor Pinnock directing The English Concert. In 2010, he played the organ for the recording of Hector Berlioz's Te Deum, Op. 22, with the BBC National Orchestra of Wales, conducted by Susanna Mälkki (CD BBC Music Magazine 2010).

He contributed music to the 1975 film Rollerball and the 1984 film Amadeus.

He also played the harpsichord, particularly in the early stages of his career, including on a recording of the Concert champêtre by Francis Poulenc.

== Awards ==
Preston was made an Officer of the Order of the British Empire (OBE) in 2000 and was promoted to a Commander (CBE) in 2009.

Cultural offices
| Preceded by Sydney Watson | Organist and Master of the Choristers of Christ Church Cathedral, Oxford; 1970–1981 | Succeeded by Francis Grier |
| Preceded by Douglas Guest | Organist and Master of the Choristers of Westminster Abbey; 1981–1988 | Succeeded by Martin Neary |
