= Leamouth =

Area of London's East End

Coordinates: 51.510719°N 0.006317°E

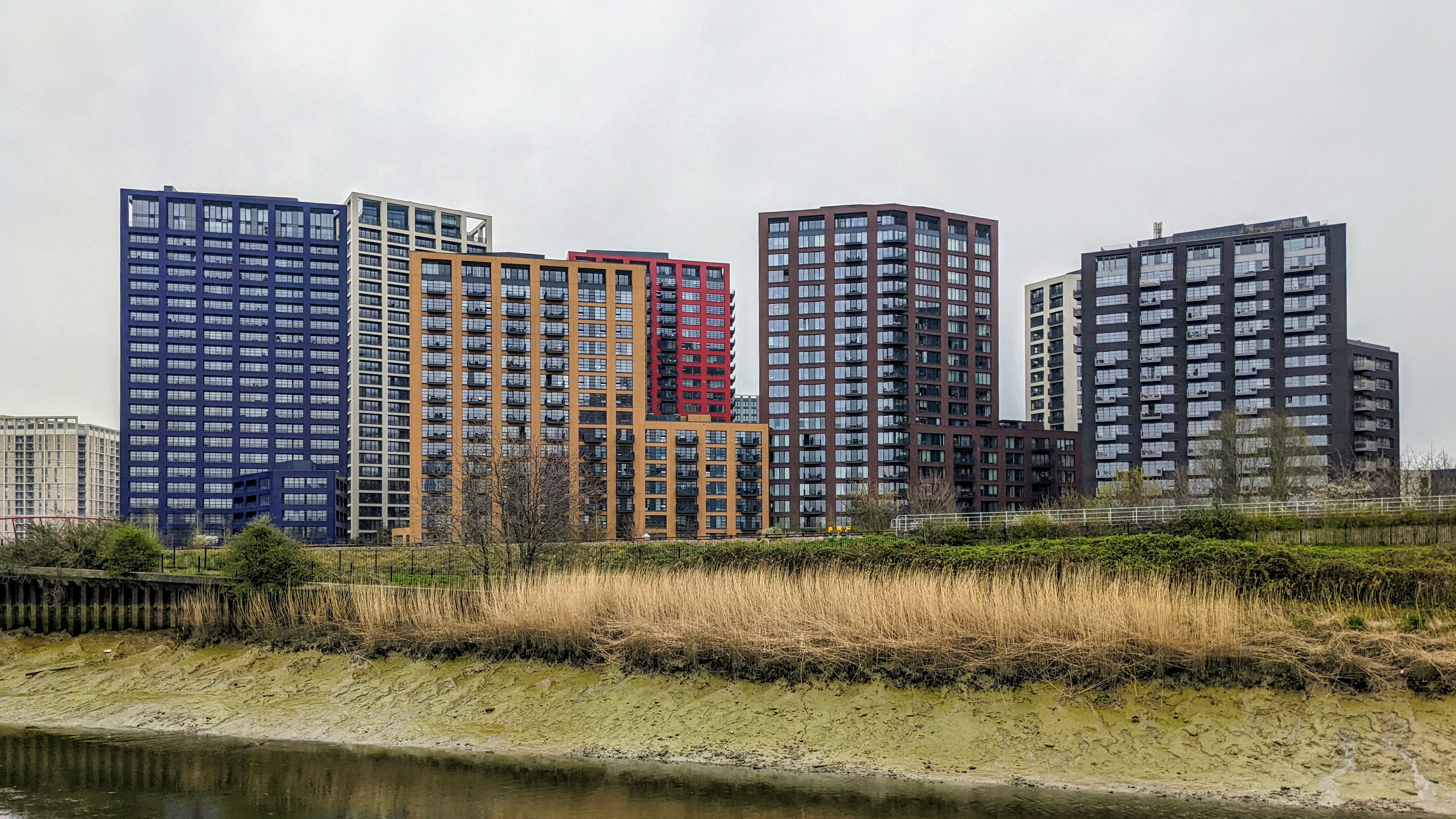
- London City Island development in 2022

- Location within Greater London
- OS grid reference: TQ394807
- London borough: Tower Hamlets
- Ceremonial county: Greater London
- Region: London
- Country: England
- Sovereign state: United Kingdom
- Post town: LONDON
- Postcode district: E14
- Dialling code: 020
- Police: Metropolitan
- Fire: London
- Ambulance: London
- UK Parliament: Poplar and Limehouse
- London Assembly: City and East

Leamouth is a locality in the Blackwall area of Poplar, in the London Borough of Tower Hamlets. The area takes its name from the former Leamouth Wharf and lies on the west side of the confluence of the Bow Creek stretch of the Lea, at its confluence with the River Thames.

The neighbourhood consists of two small peninsulas, separated from the rest of Poplar by the remaining part of the East India Docks. The northern peninsula lies in a hairpin meander and is named Goodluck Hope after one of the adjacent reaches of the Lea, while the other is known as Orchard Place. The area was traditionally the easternmost part of Middlesex, with Essex on the other side of the Lea.

The area was long referred to locally as Bog Island, due to its inaccessibility and propensity to flood; however the building of the Thames Barrier and the artificial raising of the more vulnerable riverside land, means the nickname refers to a now much reduced threat.

== Administration ==
The area was historically part of the Hamlet of Poplar, an autonomous area of the Manor and Ancient Parish of Stepney. The Hamlet of Poplar became an independent parish in 1817. The civil parish of Poplar had a vestry committee which organised services such as poor relief and road maintenance.

== History ==
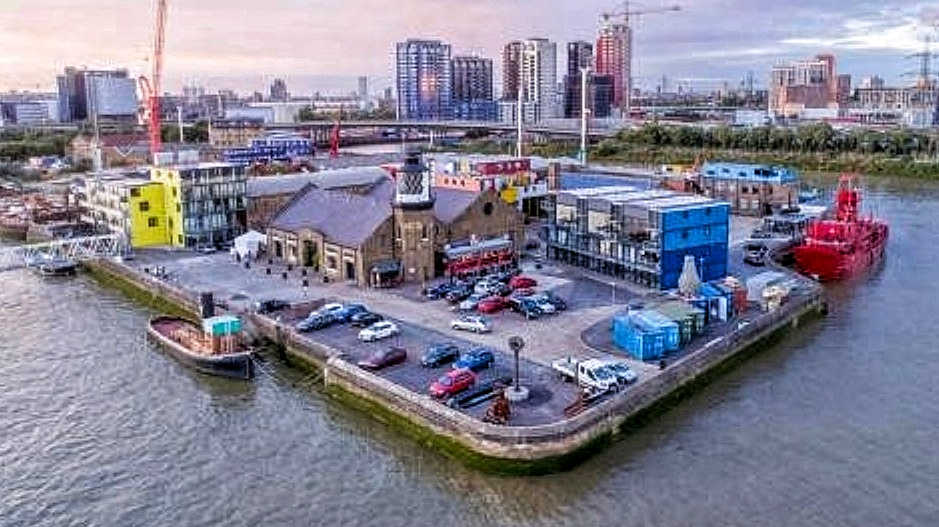
Trinity Buoy Wharf on the Goodluck Hope peninsula, Leamouth

Orchard Place was the name of its manor house on the spit; this had become an eponymous public house from 1800–60. Orchard Place gives its name to the area's main street with extends into both of the local peninsulas.

=== Isolation ===
Always an isolated location, Leamouth was made more inaccessible by the construction of the East India Docks, which opened in 1806. After that, the only access was from Leamouth Road which connects to a remote part of the East India Dock Road. Improved road connections were made available in the late 20th century.

=== Social condition ===
To house the area's workers, there were about 100 small two-storied cottages – built from the 1820s and condemned in 1935. There was the Bow Creek school (founded in 1865), but few shops, and The Crown, a public house, opened about 1840. By the late 19th century the vicinity of Orchard Place had become a deprived and overcrowded area. In the late 1930s, all homes and shops were demolished in a slum clearing project with residents moved out of the area.

=== Industry ===
The Thames Plate Glass Works was a major employer until its closure 1874; many of the hands – who had migrated to the area from Tyneside and St Helens in the 1840s – followed the glassworks to New Albany, Indiana. The site of the glass works was subsequently occupied by Pura Foods vegetable oil refinery until its closure in 2006. For many years the sugar firm Fowler's, a significant maker of treacle, was in Leamouth.

There were iron and engineering works, and shipping interests such as Samuda Brothers, Castle Shipping Line, Orchard House Yard and the Thames Iron Works. The Thames Ironworks was based at the mouth of Bow Creek at the confluence of the Lea and Thames. The yard started at Leamouth Wharf, on the Blackwall side of the Lea, and subsequently extended to include a much larger site at Canning Town, in the parish and borough or West Ham, on the eastern side. These two parts of the shipyard were linked by a chain ferry capable of carrying 200 workers at a time. The yard was responsible for many shipbuilding and other engineering projects including the revolutionary HMS Warrior and the dreadnought HMS Thunderer.

Warships being built at the eastern site in or slightly before 1902

=== Sporting legacy ===
The Thames Ironworks Yard shut in 1912, but its work team Thames Ironworks F.C., founded in 1895, continues to the current day as West Ham United. Another Leamouth shipyard was the repair yard of the Castle Shipping Line, their works team Castle Swifts would indirectly merge with the Thames Ironworks football team in 1895.

== Contemporary Leamouth ==
Trinity Buoy Wharf contains London's only lighthouse. There are also live-work units, many in the form of the Container Cities.

=== Redevelopment projects ===
The London City Island is a major redevelopment project by architects Glenn Howells that will provide 1,706 homes, stores, shops, restaurants, cafés, and arts facilities including the English National Ballet. Goodluck Hope is a residential-led development by Todd Architects comprising 804 apartments, lofts and townhouses.

In September 2025, planning permission was granted for the development of a mixed-use complex comprising a wharf, student accommodation, and social housing. The site, located on a peninsula, had previously been designated as a Safeguarded wharf. For several decades, the land remained vacant due to planning restrictions associated with its safeguarded status and limited demand for additional wharf capacity in the area.

=== Roads ===
The Leamouth Peninsula has historically had poor transport links compared to the rest of Poplar, today it is connected to it by a main road splitting its halves: the A1020 Lower Lea Crossing which is a local by-pass of the A13.

=== Public transport ===
The "Jubilee" pedestrian bridge across the Lea links the area to the east bank of the Lea, and Canning Town station.

Leamouth has been served by the London Buses network for the first time by the D3 to Bethnal Green which starts and ends on Orchard Place since 2017. The N550 between Canning Town station and Blackwall was rerouted via Leamouth to provide night links whenever access to Canning Town station is restricted; implemented in September 2018.
