= C. H. Trevor =

English organist, music editor and teacher

Caleb Henry Trevor (b Much Wenlock, Shropshire, March 17, 1895; d London, June 16, 1976) was an English organist, music editor and teacher.

== Life ==
C. H. Trevor was the son of Henry John Trevor. He studied at - and graduated from - Oxford University. On 29 April 1930 he married Joan Lucy Fremantle with whom he had a son.

=== Organist ===
Although largely self-taught as an organist C H Trevor was appointed to a series of prestigious organist and teaching posts. In 1971 the Council of the UK’s Royal College of Organists conferred on Trevor an honorary membership and at the same time awarded him the College’s Fellowship diploma (F.R.C.O.) honoris causa.

==== Organist posts ====
- [n.d.][ Organist of St. Michael's-at-the-North-Gate, Oxford.
- [n.d.] Organist to the Honourable Society of Lincolns Inn, London.
- 1926–27. Sub-organist at Wells Cathedral.
- 1927-37(?). Organist of St. Paul's Cathedral, Kolkata.
- 1937–64. Organist of St Peter's Eaton Square, London.

As a recitalist he was noted above all for Baroque music, though a series of broadcasts in 1935 did much to awaken interest in Reger's organ music

=== Teacher ===
- [n.d.] Director of Music at Sherborne School.
- 1936(?)–64. Professor of Organ at the Royal Academy of Music, London.

His Royal Academy of Music pupils have included:

- Kenneth Alwyn
- Hazel Davies
- David Patrick Gedge
- Sir Nicholas Jackson
- Alistair Jones
- Simon Preston
- Christopher Regan
- Barry Rose
- Anthony Saunders
- Martindale Sidwell

Trevor's 'Oxford Organ Method' [Oxford University Press, 1971] became an overnight bestseller ... widely used tutor.

=== Editor ===
His abiding legacy is in the large number of series of graded anthologies of organ music he edited. These contain works of all periods, many of them by composers then largely unknown to British organists.

- 1957 The Progressive Organist series (pub. Elkin & Co. and later continued by Oxford University Press)
- 1960. A second book of wedding pieces (pub. Oxford University Press)
- 1060. An Album of memorial and funeral music (pub. Oxford University Press)
- 1960. Organ music for Christmas (pub. Oxford University Press)
- 1962. Seasonal chorale preludes for manuals only (pub. Oxford University Press)
- 1963. Communion by Charles Gounod : for organ (pub. Elkin & Co.)
- 1963. Seasonal chorale preludes, with pedals (pub. Oxford University Press)
- 1964. A concise school of fugal playing (pub. Oxford University Press)
- 1964. A concise school of trio playing for organ (pub. Oxford University Press)
- 1966. Old English organ music for manuals (pub. Oxford University Press)
- 1971. A Bach organ book for students (pub. Oxford University Press)
- 1972. Organ music for manuals (pub. Oxford University Press)
- 1972. Two Passion-tide anthems by Charles Gounod (pub. Novello)
- 1974. Short chorale preludes : with and without pedals. (pub. Oxford University Press)
