= John Craig (priest) =

Church of England priest

Reverend John Craig (1805–1877) was a Church of England priest, known for construction of All Saints Church, Leamington Spa and Holy Trinity Church, Leamington Spa, and funding of the Craig telescope.

== Life ==
=== Early life in Ireland ===
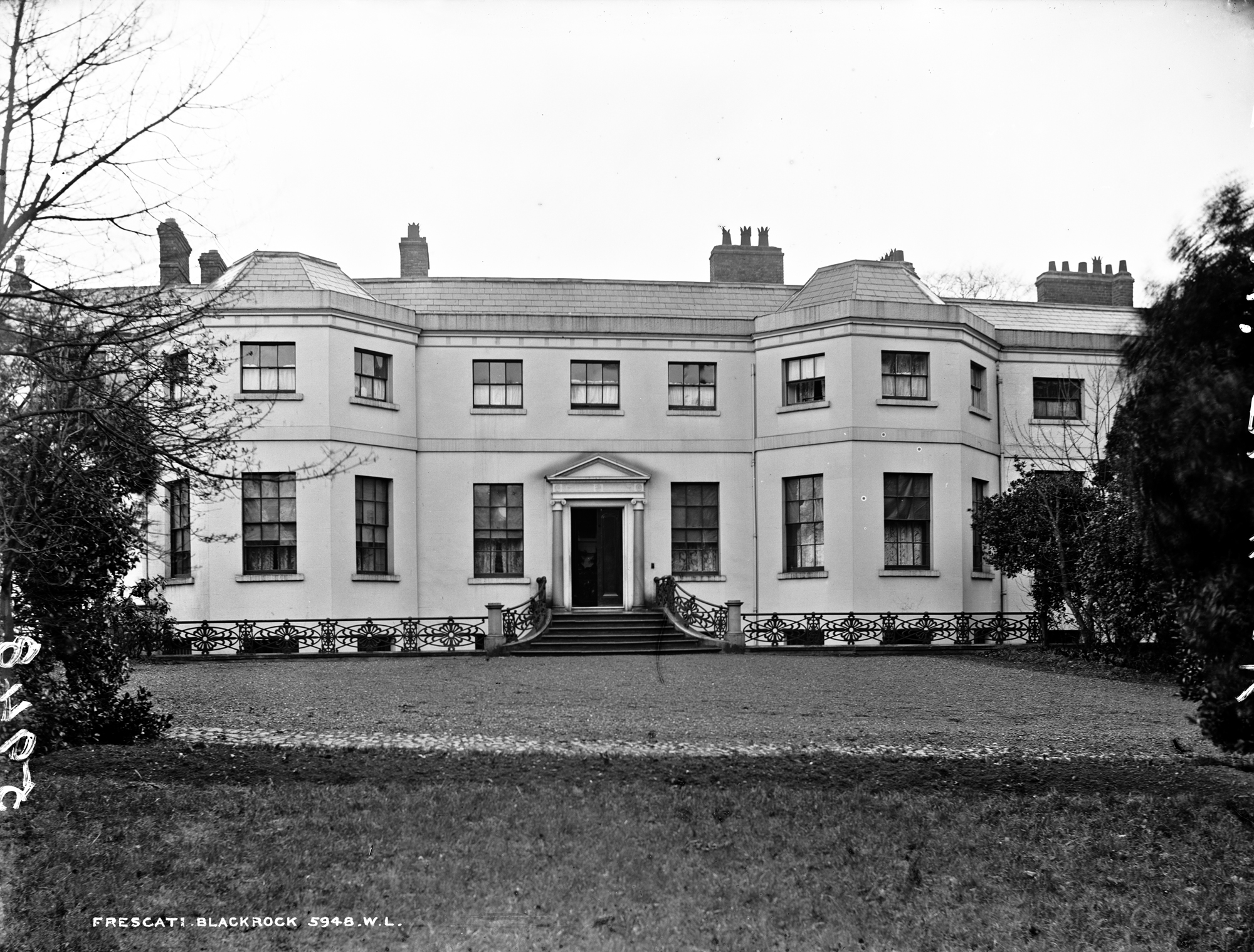
Craig's childhood home, Frescati House

Craig was born in 1805 in Blackrock, Dublin, where his father Robert, a Scot, was managing a boys' school in Frescati House. He later attended Trinity College, Dublin, taking a BA degree in 1826, and in 1829 was ordained a deacon.

His father died in 1829, leaving him £20,000 and an estate worth £1,300 a year.

In Dublin he married Anne Jane Alley, and in 1831 they had a son named Robert, who would later die of consumption. In 1832, he gained his MA degree.

=== London and Fetcham ===
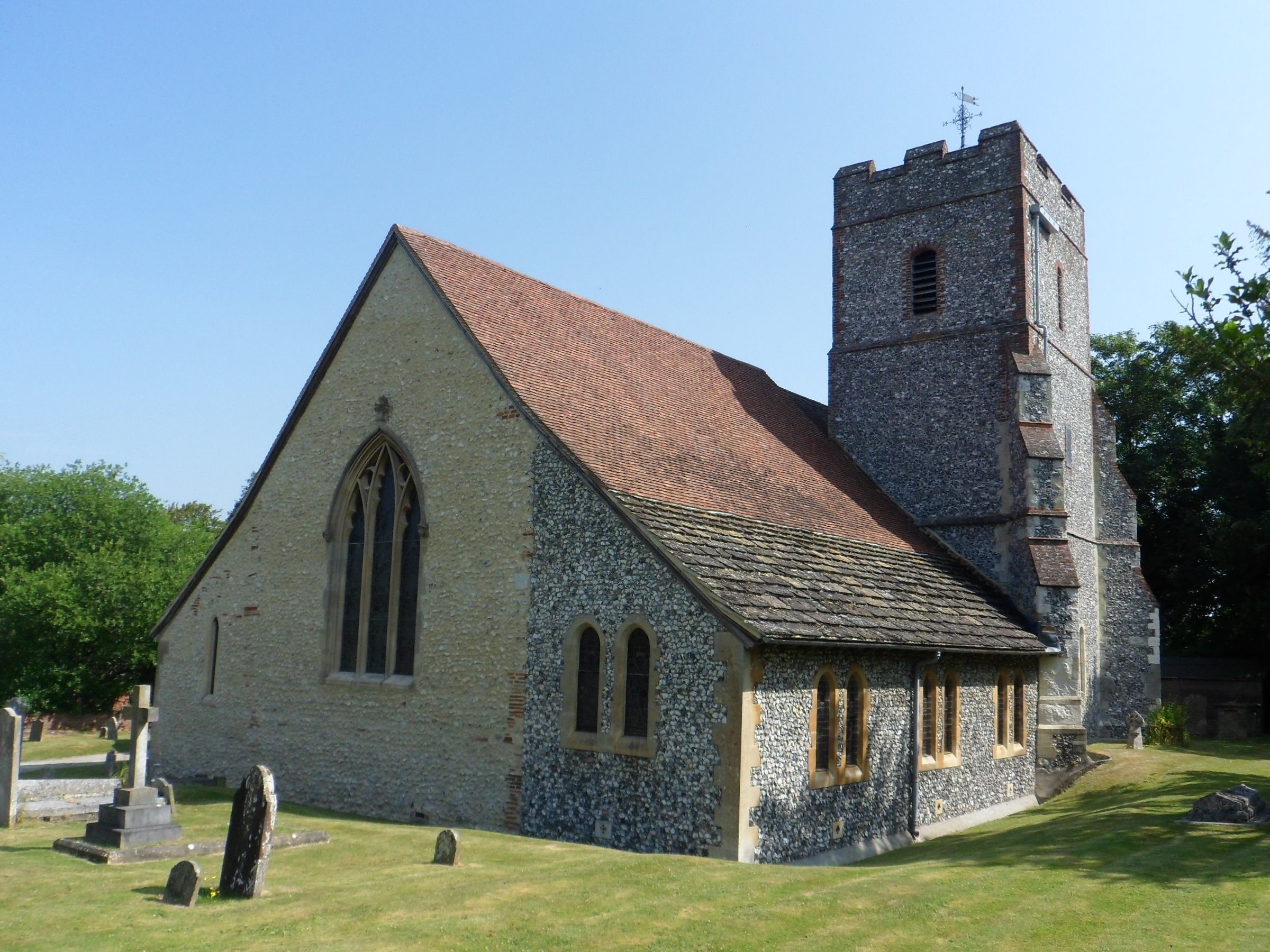
St Mary, Fetcham, Craig's first parish

By 1834, he had moved from Ireland to Cambridge in England, apparently due to abuse received due to his anti-Catholic pronouncements. His first wife Anne died in 1834 in Hastings.

In 1834, he was preaching in London, where he met and married Jane Helena Johnstone, known as Helena. She had a personal fortunate of £56,000.

In 1836, he was granted the living of Church of St Mary, Fetcham.

=== Leamington Spa ===
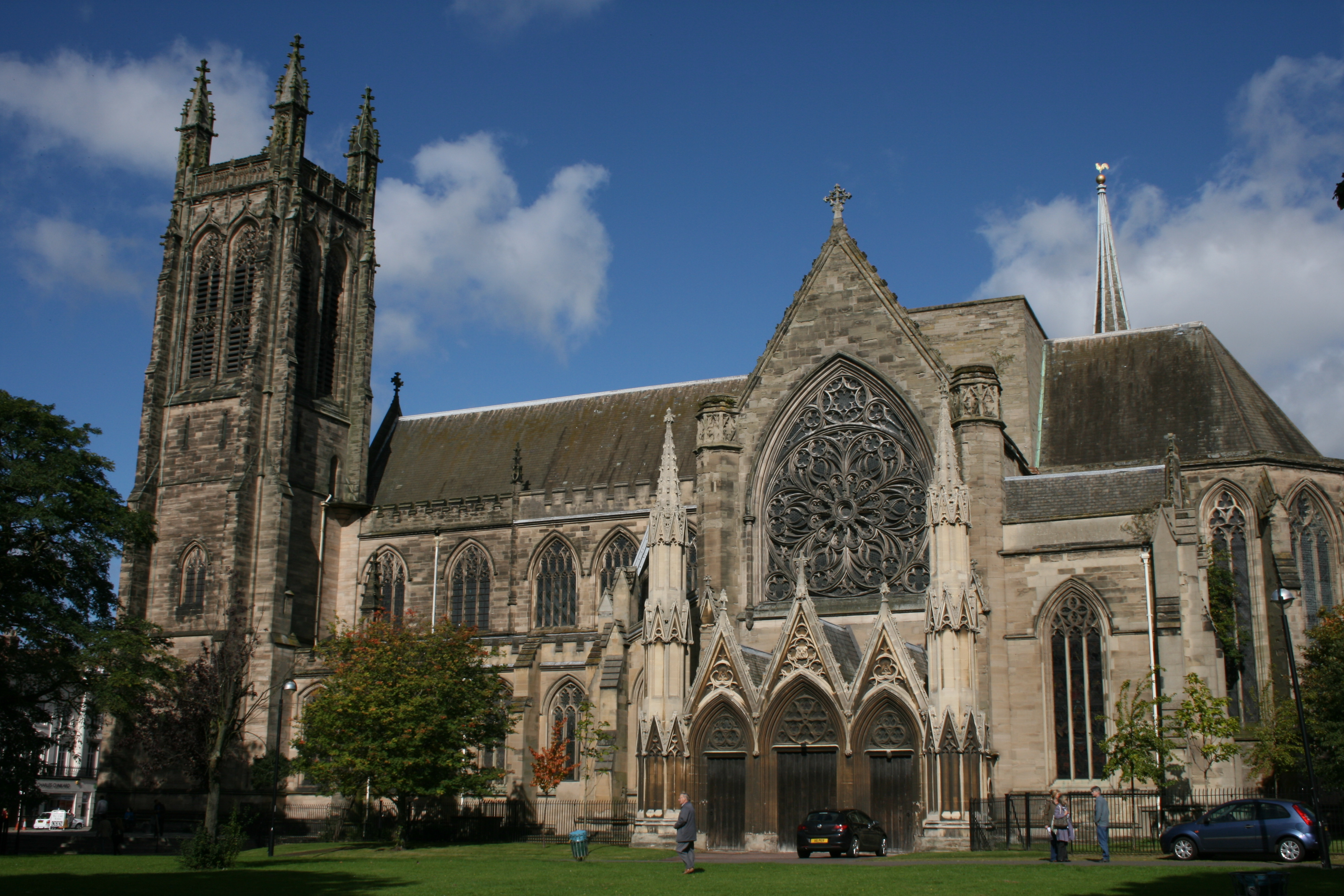
All Saints Church, Leamington Spa, constructed by Craig

In 1839, he exchanged the parish with the Revd Robert Downes for that of All Saints Church, Leamington Spa. It was reported at the time by local journalist George Morley that Craig's income exceeded £100,000.

At that time, All Saints was a small medieval church, which had had some enlargement but was greatly inadequate to the needs of the growing population. In 1842, Craig began to plan to replace the church, to his own plan and largely from his own pocket.

He had plans drawn up by local architect JG Jackson, but is said to have acted largely as his own architect. Local tradition states that he dismissed 11 architects during the church's construction, and eventually appointed himself Clerk of Works.

The nave opened for worship in 1844, still incomplete and attached to the transept of the old church. The chancel was completed in 1845, and the north transept in 1849, but construction then halted.

In 1847, he also commissioned local firm Mitchell of Leamington Spa to complete Holy Trinity Church, Leamington Spa, started in 1825, as a chantry chapel to All Saints.

=== Telescope ===
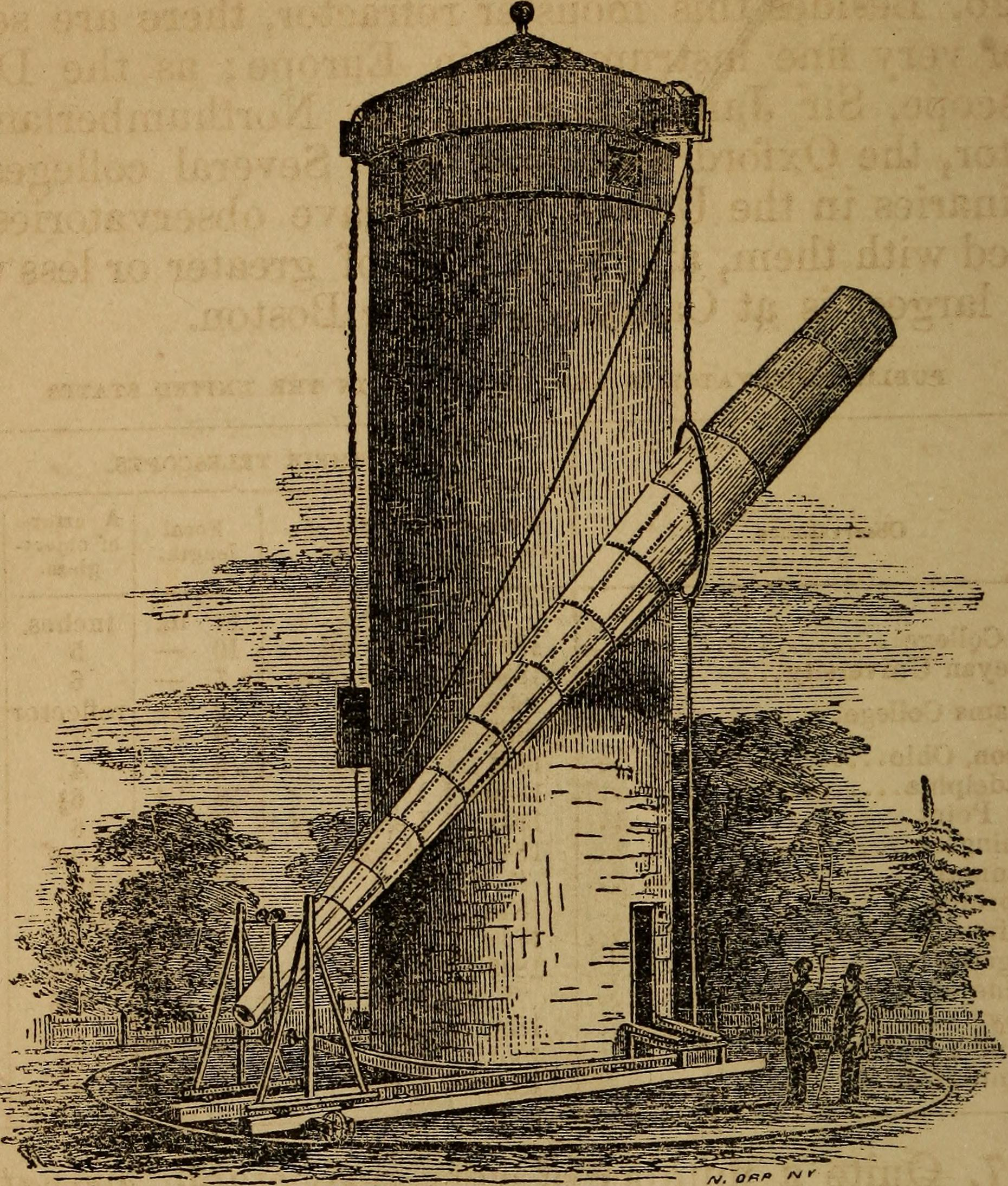
Craig's telescope on Wandsworth Common

In 1852, Craig set about on a project to construct a huge new telescope, the Craig telescope, on Wandsworth Common. The telescope was constructed, on land donated by Frederick Spencer, 4th Earl Spencer. However, the telescope was not successful, and with Helena's death in March 1854, he returned to Leamington.

=== Return to Leamington Spa ===
In the 1850s, Craig was involved in monetary disputes, and was jailed for a short period in Warwick.

In 1867 he recommenced building of the church, this time engaging architect T C Barry to design the South transept.

Craig's third wife, Jane, died in 1870. In his old age he had his right foot amputated, and had to be carried to church each Sunday.

=== Death ===
He died in 1877, aged 71, and his funeral is said to have been the largest ever seen in Leamington.

All Saints Church was completed after Craig's death by Sir Arthur Blomfield; Nikolaus Pevsner says the later work "is of course far more knowledgable, but it lacks Craig's improvident zest".
