= Thames Plate Glass Company =

Thames Plate Glass Company was a British glass works that operated from 1835 to 1874. Its factories were located at the northern end of Goodluck Hope peninsula, and it was a major employer in Orchard Place district. It demonstrated some very large plate glass at The Great Exhibition of 1851.

The company produced part of the optics for the Craig telescope, a large telescope with a lens built in the 1850s. The lens was a doublet with a flint glass by Chance Brothers and a plate glass cast by Thames Plate Glass Company.

In 1872 the company provided glass samples to Professor Barff. He had a lecture published about this in the Journal of the Society of the Arts in April 1872. He also noted statistics provided by the Thames Plate Glass Company, which state that the UK was producing 7.5 million feet of plate glass per year.

The company went out of business by the mid-1870s.

One of those employed by the company was Cuthbert Dixon, who went on to manage a plate-class company in America.

Some contemporaries to the company were the Birmingham Plate Glass Company, British Plate Glass Company, and the Manchester and Liverpool Plate Glass Company.

== See also ==
- Leamouth
- Industrial Revolution
