= Benjamin Satchwell =

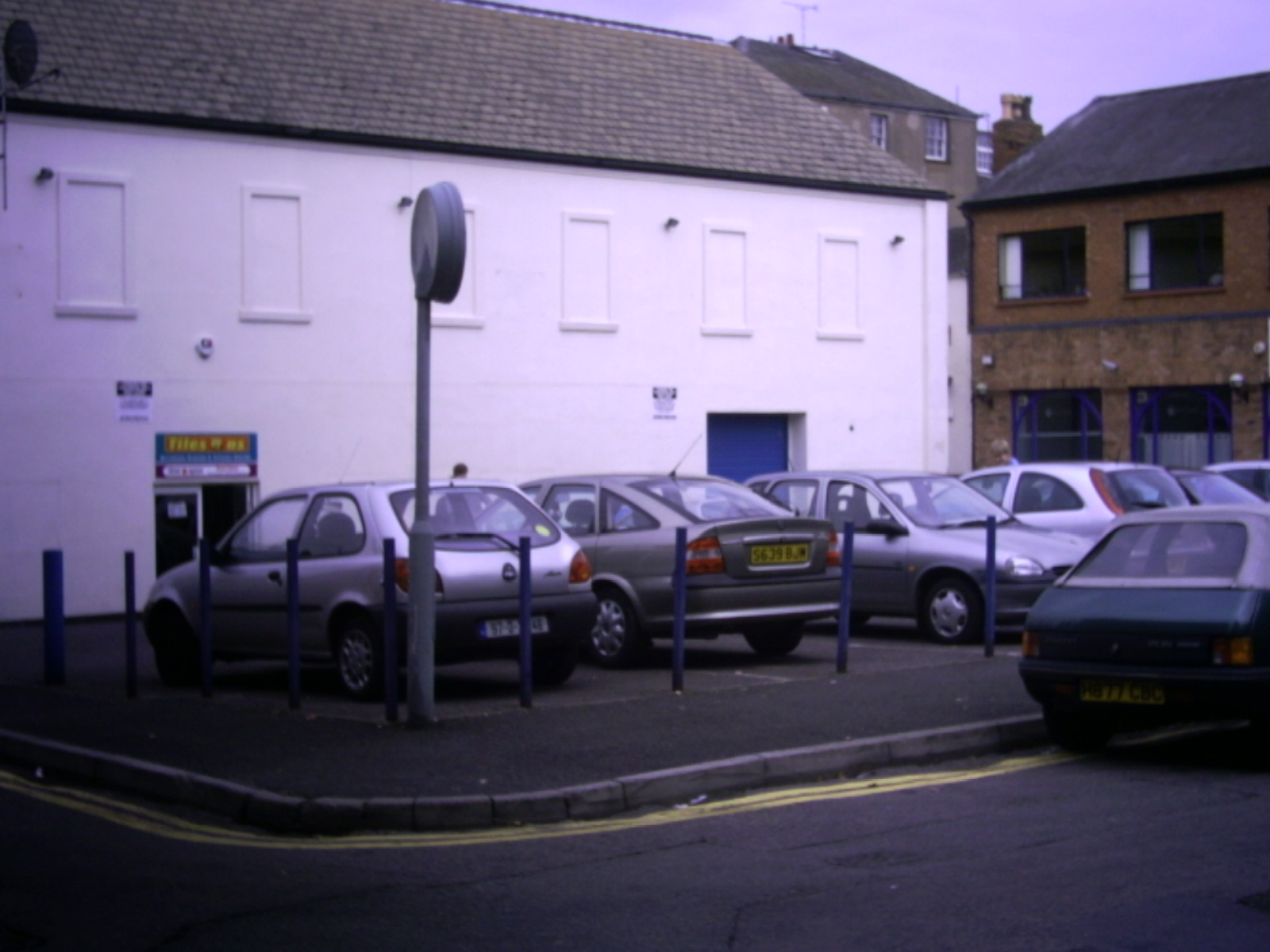
The site of the well discovered by Abbotts and Satchwell

Benjamin Satchwell (3 January 1732–1 December 1810) was one of the founding fathers of Leamington Spa in Warwickshire, England. Satchwell's cottage was in the old town to the south of the River Leam. He was the village's first postmaster, using his cottage as the post office, a shoemaker, and acted as an official mediator between two people in the village with a quarrel. In 1777 he helped set up The Foundation of Hospitality, a savings scheme which helped the poorer people of the village get medical attention.

On 23 April 1764, at St Mary Magdalene's Church, Lillington he married Mary Whitmore with whom he had 11 children: Hannah, Elizabeth, David, William, Elizabeth, Anne, Joseph, Kezia, George & Phoebe.

On 14 January 1784 Satchwell made the discovery that he would be remembered for. Until that date there was only one known spring in Leamington, on land belonging to the 4th Earl of Aylesford, who refused to sell the water (which was used for bathing and medicinal purposes), instead allowing people to have it for free. However, in 1784 Satchwell and his friend William Abbotts found a second spring and in the manner of the time used its supposed medicinal qualities to make money from the leisured classes.

After Satchwell and Abbotts' spring was found several wells were bored and water was drawn. Leamington quickly grew into one of the most fashionable spa resorts of the 19th century, a process which turned it from a sleepy village to a thriving town.

In 1806 Satchwell founded the Leamington Spa Charity, with the assistance of Reverend James Walhouse. The charity was to help the sick poor, who were to provide a certificate of need from a respectable person or parish officer, entitling them to a weekly lodgings allowance of 5s, subject to medical supervision. Money was raised from hotels and subscriptions, with Satchwell both the secretary and treasurer until his death in 1810. He was also well known for his poetry, which he wrote and performed. He died of a chest condition and was buried in Leamington's parish church, All Saints on 4 December 1810, just yards from where his friend Abbotts had been laid to rest four years earlier. Two years after his death, Satchwell was to be honoured as a 'patron and friend' of the town, given a raised tomb fit for a nobleman or gentleman in the churchyard of All Saints.

== Satchwell's Legacy ==
- Three streets in Leamington have been named after Satchwell: Satchwell Street, Satchwell Court and Satchwell Place.
- The Wetherspoons pub chain, noted for naming its pubs after important local people or events, has named its Leamington outlet "The Benjamin Satchwell".
- There is a picture of Satchwell in the National Portrait Gallery in London.
- A pair of Satchwell's spectacles take pride of place in Leamington's museum.
