= All Saints Church, Leamington Spa =

Church in England

Coordinates: 52°17′10″N 01°31′56″W

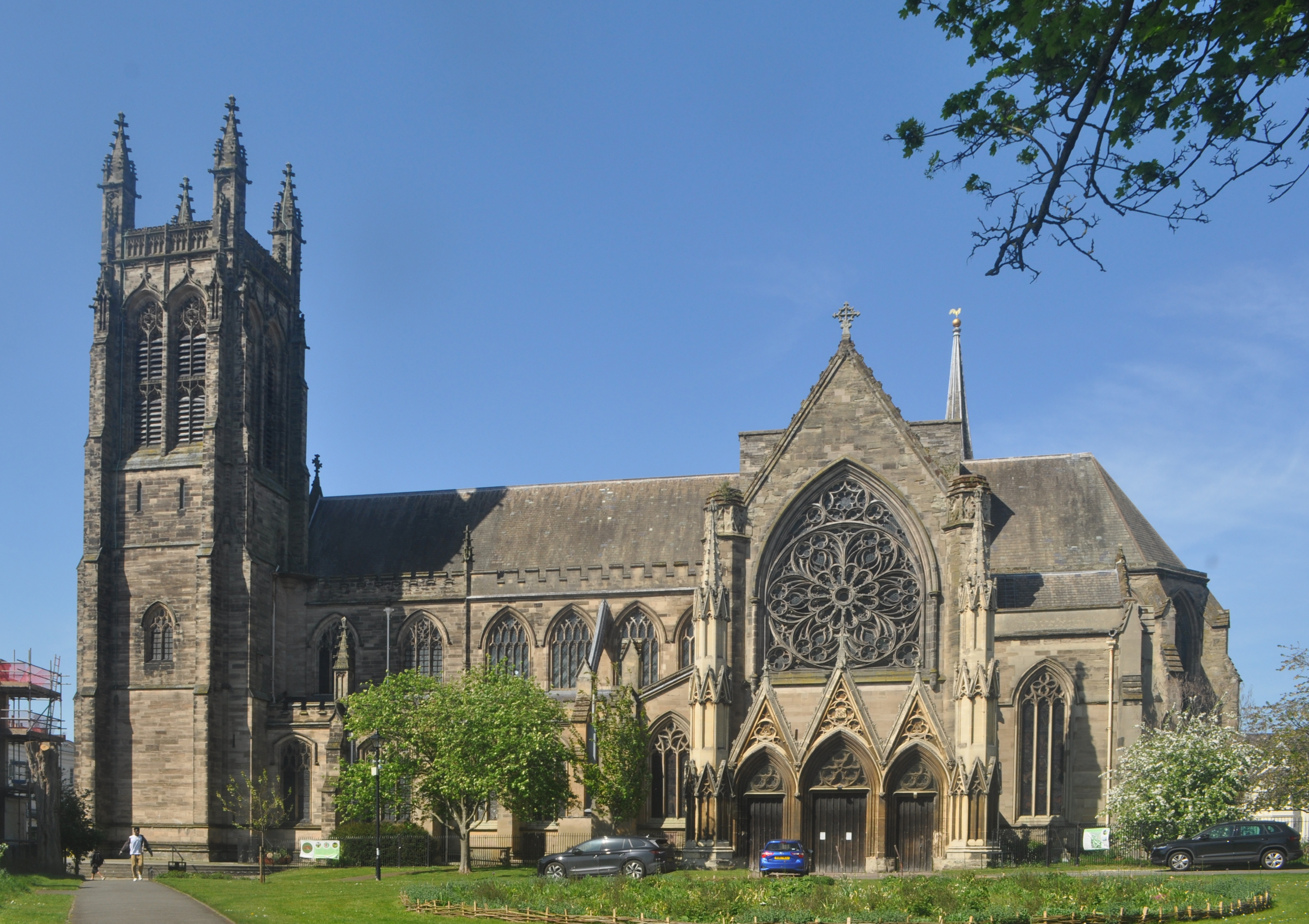
- The church from the south in 2026
- All Saints Church, Leamington Spa
- Denomination: Church of England
- Churchmanship: Liberal Anglo-Catholicism
- Website: www.allsaintschurchleamington.org.uk

History
- Dedication: All Saints

Administration
- Province: Canterbury
- Parish: Leamington Priors

Clergy
- Vicar: Fr Christopher Wilson Mus B (Hons) MTh (Oxon)

Listed Building – Grade II*
- Official name: Church of All Saints
- Designated: 19 November 1953
- Reference no.: 1381145

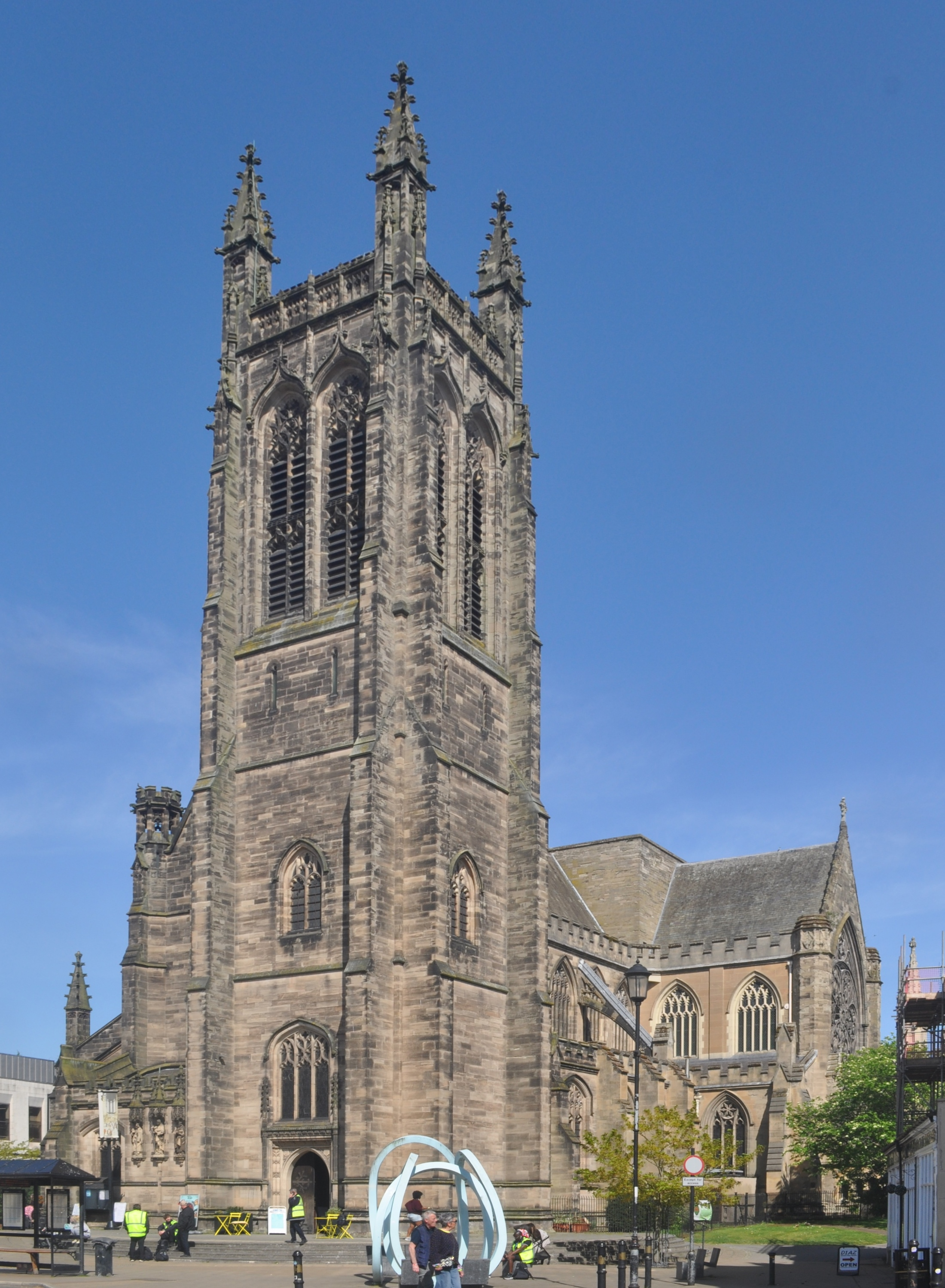
The church from the west-southwest in 2026

All Saints' Church is the parish church of Leamington Spa, Warwickshire, England. The current building, which replaced a smaller medieval church, was largely constructed in phases between 1843 and 1869 by vicar John Craig who often acted as his own architect. It is a grade II* listed building.

The church is inclusive and supports women's ordained ministry and equality for LGBTQIA+ people within the church.

== Background ==
Built in the Gothic Revival style in the 19th century, it has been described as "one of the largest Church of England parish churches, rivaling many cathedrals in size." It is located in the centre of the town, just south of the River Leam in what was the old core of the town.

== History ==
The Domesday Book of 1086 reports that there was a priest present in "Lamintone", (an old name for Leamington) although there is no specific mention of a church. The earliest record of one was from the 12th century when Leamington was still a tiny hamlet in the parish of Leek Wootton. A west tower was added in the 14th century whilst a south porch was put added in the 18th. The first spring (of many that made Leamington famous) was located just outside the main entrance of the church of land owned by the Earl of Aylesford.

It was however in 1843 that the church began to take its current form and shape. By this time the church was no longer in open fields just to the north of a hamlet, but was in the centre of a bustling spa town. (Two of Leamington's town founders, Benjamin Satchwell and William Abbotts, are buried in the churchyard.)

The main construction took place between 1843 and 1869, overseen and largely funded by vicar John Craig. Designs were drawn up by architect J.G. Jackson of Leamington, but Craig is reported to have been largely his own architect.

In 1867 the south transept was added by the architect TC Barry.

The last major works to take place to the church, after Craig's death, were from 1898 to 1902 by the architect Sir Arthur Blomfield, when two western bays to the nave and a south western bell tower were added. The seating capacity was increased to around 2000. From September 2007 to February 2008 the church precincts were redeveloped and a new sculpture, entitled 'Spring', was installed on the site of the original Leamington spa spring.

== The church today ==
The church remains in active use as a place of worship, with Sunday and other major services accompanied by the surpliced choir. Despite the fragmentation of its parish during the 19th century, All Saints is still known and used as Leamington's Parish Church. The church hosts and promotes organ recitals and concerts, as well as the annual All Saints' Arts Festival. It also runs a group for LGBTQIA+ Christians called LGBTXians. There is a lively Ukrainian cafe inside the church, which opens Tuesday-Saturday.

== Vicars of Leamington from 1823 ==
- Robert Downes 1823 – 1839
- John Craig 1839 – 1877
- The Hon. J.W. Leigh 1877 – 1884
- Walter Furneaux 1884 – 1896
- Cecil Hook 1896 – 1906
- W. Armstrong Buck 1906 – 1916
- Frederick Feist 1916 – 1933
- G.C. Rolfe 1933 – 1943
- R.C. Streatfield 1943 – 1959
- Anthony Rouse 1959 – 1963
- Idwal Jones 1963 – 1980
- Ian Campbell 1980 – 1991
- J. Gareth Miller 1991–1993
- Interregnum 1993 – 1995
- George Warner 1995 – 2002 (Priest-in-Charge of All Saints and of Holy Trinity)
- Christopher Wilson 2003 – present (Priest-in-Charge, later Vicar of All Saints and of Holy Trinity)

=== Directors of Music ===
- Peter Smith
- Simon Tayton, BA, MSc, FCMI
- Bea van der Kaaij
- Julian Parkin 2008 – 2013
- David Williams, FRCO 2013 – 2014
- Simon Lawford, BA, MA, FRCO 2014
- Richard Cook, BA 2014
- Simon Tayton, BA, MSc, FCMI 2014 – 2017
- Suzanne Green, BA, MA 2018 – 2019
- Suzanne Green & Alex Silverman (Job Share) 2019–2022
- Alex Silverman 2022-present

== Organ ==
The church has a pipe organ by William Hill & Sons dating from 1879. There have been subsequent rebuilds by Hill, Norman and Beard in 1926, and Longstaff & Jones in 1981. The organ is described in the National Pipe Organ Register.

=== List of organists ===
- Henry T Elliston 1820
- Henry Matthews 1864
- Thomas Bladon 1876
- Frank Spinney, FCO 1878
- Walter Spinney 1888
- W H Bellamy 1894
- Lionel Wiggins, Hon RCM FRCO ARCM 1922
- Robert Dickinson, BMus FRCO LRAM 1951
- Hugh Large, FRCO ARCM 1956
- Neil Wade, ARCM, ARCO 1964
- Graham Steed, BMus FRCO 1965
- Alan Jones 1967
- Derrick Stiff 1968
- Keith Sedgebeer, BA 1970
- David M Palmer 1972
- Robert E Munns, FRAM, ARCO, ARCM 1983
- John Wilks, BA BMus FRCO 1987
- Colin Druce, GBSM FRCO ARCM 1988
- Sean Montgomery, ARCO 1998
- Jeremy Meager, ARCO 2007
- Cynthia Hall, MA FRCO 2009
- David Williams, FRCO 2012
- Christopher Beaumont, BMus(hons) MA FTCL 2019
