= Neverland =

Fictional island in Peter Pan and other works of J. M. Barrie

- Peter and Wendy location
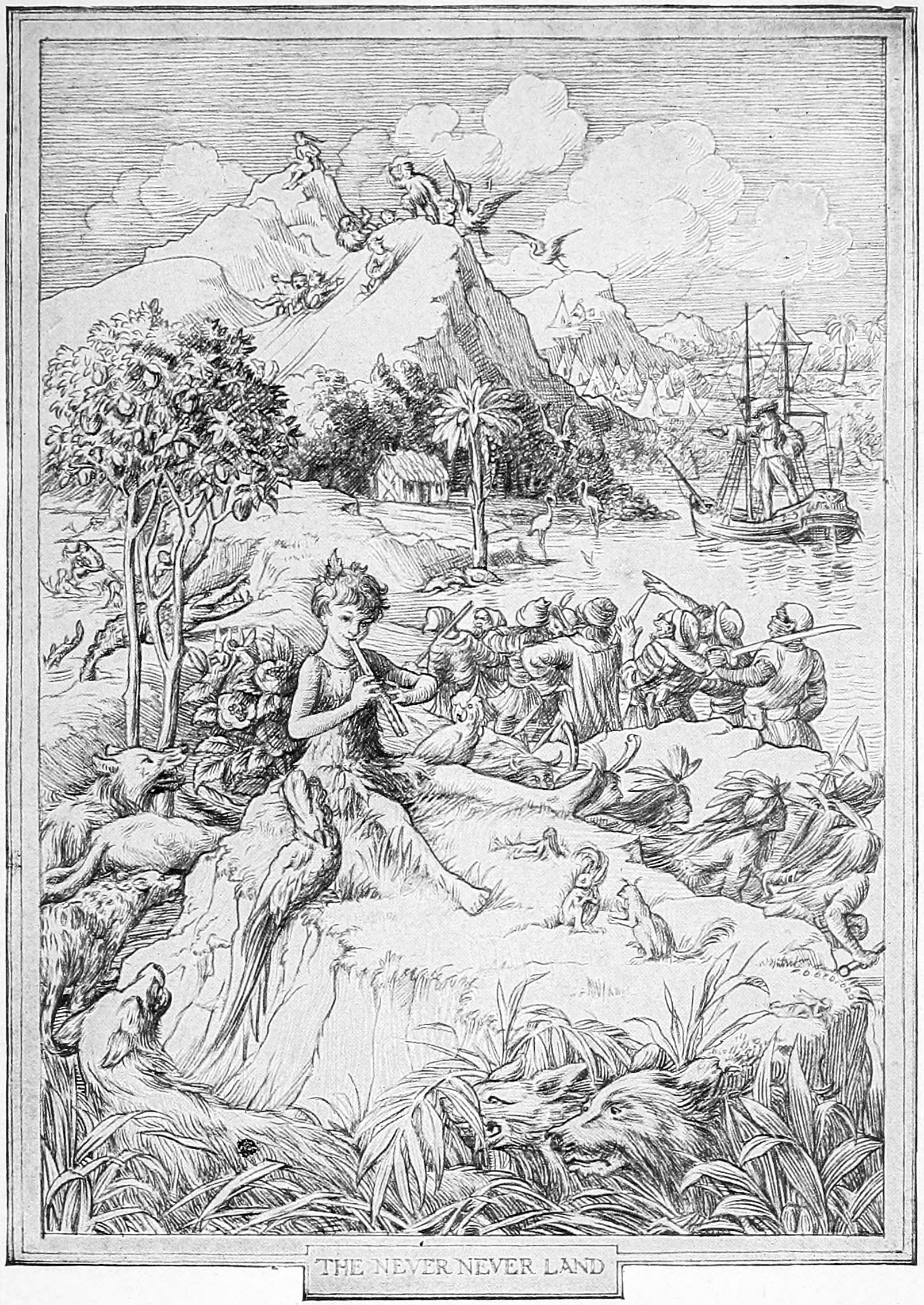
- Peter Pan playing the pipes, with Neverland in the background (illustration by F. D. Bedford, Peter and Wendy), 1911
- First appearance: Peter Pan or the Boy Who Would Not Grow Up (1904)
- Created by: J. M. Barrie
- Genre: Children's fantasy

In-universe information
- Other name: Never Never Land
- Type: Fictional island
- Locations: Neverwood, Mermaids' Lagoon, Marooners' Rock
- Characters: Peter Pan, Captain Hook, Tinker Bell, Tiger Lily
- Population: Lost Boys, Pirates, Fairies, Native Americans, Mermaids

Neverland is a fictional island featured in the works of J. M. Barrie and those based on them. It is an imaginary faraway place where Peter Pan, Tinker Bell, Captain Hook, the Lost Boys, and some other imaginary beings and creatures live.

Although not all people who come to Neverland cease to age, its best-known resident, Peter Pan, famously refused to grow up. Thus, the term is often used as a metaphor for eternal childhood (and childishness), as well as immortality and escapism.

The concept was first introduced as "the Never Never Land" in Barrie's West End theatre play Peter Pan, or The Boy Who Wouldn't Grow Up, first staged in 1904. In the earliest drafts of the play, the island was called "Peter's Never Never Never Land", a name possibly influenced by the 'Never Never', a contemporary term for outback Australia. In the 1928 published version of the play's script, the name was shortened to "the Never Land". Although the caption to one of F. D. Bedford's illustrations also calls it "The Never Never Land", Barrie's 1911 novelisation Peter and Wendy simply refers to it as "the Neverland," and its many variations "the Neverlands." Most Disney material, such as Return to Never Land, gives its name as "Never Land".

Neverland has been featured prominently in subsequent works that either adapted Barrie's works or expanded upon them. These Neverlands sometimes vary in nature from the original.

== Description ==
=== Location ===
The novel says that the Neverlands are compact enough that adventures are never far between, and that a map of a child's mind would resemble a map of Neverland, with no boundaries at all. Accordingly, Barrie explains that the Neverlands are found in the minds of children; although each is "always more or less an island" as well as having a family resemblance, they are not the same from one child to the next. For example, John Darling's Neverland had "a lagoon with flamingos flying over it," while his little brother Michael's had "a flamingo with lagoons flying over it."

The exact situation of Neverland is ambiguous and vague. In Barrie's original tale, the name for the real world is the Mainland, which suggests Neverland is a small island, reached by flight. Peter—who is described as saying "anything that came into his head"—tells Wendy the way to Neverland is "second to the right, and straight on till morning." In the novel, the children are said to have found the island only because it was "out looking for them." Barrie additionally writes that Neverland is near the "stars of the milky way" and it is reached "always at the time of sunrise."

In Barrie's Peter Pan in Kensington Gardens (1906), a proto-version of Neverland, located in the Serpentine in Kensington Gardens, is called the Birds' Island, where baby Peter reaches by flight, or by sailing in a paper boat or thrush's nest.

Walt Disney's 1953 Peter Pan adds a "star" to Peter's directions: "second star to the right, and straight on till morning." From afar, these stars depict Neverland in the distance. The 2003 live-action film (produced by Universal Pictures, Columbia Pictures, Revolution Studios, Red Wagon Entertainment and Allied Stars Ltd) repeats this representation, as the Darling children are flown through the Solar System to reach Neverland. In the 1991 film Hook (produced by TriStar Pictures and Amblin Entertainment), Neverland is shown to be located in the same way as the 1953 Disney film. While flying is the only way to reach it, the film does not show exactly how Captain Hook manages to get from Neverland to London in order to kidnap Peter's children, Jack and Maggie. In Peter Pan in Scarlet (2006), by Geraldine McCaughrean, Neverland is located in waters known as the 'Sea of One Thousand Islands'. The children get to the island by flying on a road called the High Way.

In Peter David's 2009 novel Tigerheart, Neverland is renamed the Anyplace and is described as being both a physical place and a dream land where human adults and children go when they dream. Additionally, there is a location called the Noplace which is cold and devoid of colour where people in a coma and those who are "lost" live. In the 2011 miniseries Neverland, inspired by Barrie's works, the titular place is said to be another planet existing at the centre of the universe. It is accessible only via a magic portal generated by a strange sphere.

In the 2015 American film Pan, Neverland is a floating island in a sky-like dimension.

=== Time ===
The passage of time in Neverland is similarly ambiguous. The novel Peter and Wendy mentions that in Neverland there are many more suns and moons than on the Mainland, making time difficult to track. One way to tell the time is to find the crocodile, and wait until the clock inside it strikes the hour. Although Neverland is widely thought of as a place where children don't grow up, it is made clear in Peter and Wendy that Lost Boys can grow up and are vaguely thinned out as punishment for doing so. Peter also explains to Wendy that fairies have short lifespans, another temporal confusion.

In Peter Pan in Scarlet (2006), by Geraldine McCaughrean, time freezes as soon as the children arrive in Neverland. In the 2011 miniseries Neverland, in which Neverland is said to be another planet entirely, time has frozen due to external cosmic forces converging on the planet, preventing anyone living there from ageing.

== Locations within Neverland ==
=== Canon ===
In J. M. Barrie's play and novel, most of the adventures in the stories take place in the Neverwood, where the Lost Boys hunt and fight the pirates and Native Americans.

Peter and the Lost Boys live in the Home Under The Ground, which also contains Tinker Bell's "private apartment." The Home is accessed by sliding down hollowed tree trunks, one for each boy.

It consisted of one large room, ... with a floor in which you could dig if you wanted to go fishing, and in this floor grew stout mushrooms of a charming colour, which were used as stools. A Never tree tried hard to grow in the centre of the room, but every morning they sawed the trunk through, level with the floor."

The Little House is built from branches by the Lost Boys for Wendy after she is hit by Tootles' arrow. At the end of the play, one year after the main events in the story, the house appears in different spots every night, but always on some tree-tops. The Little House is the original "Wendy house," now the name of a children's playhouse.

The Jolly Roger is the pirates' brig, described by Barrie as "a rakish-looking craft foul to the hull."

The mermaids live in the Mermaids' Lagoon, which is also the location of Marooners' Rock, the most dangerous place in Neverland. Trapped on Marooners' Rock in the lagoon just offshore, Peter faced impending death by drowning, as he could not swim or fly from it to safety. The mermaids made no attempt to rescue him, but he was saved by the Never bird.

=== Non-canon ===
In the many film, television, and video game adaptations of Peter Pan, adventures that originally take place in either the Mermaids' Lagoon, the Neverwood forest, or on the pirates' ship are played out in a greater number of more elaborate locations.

==== Disney ====
Map of Neverland created by Walt Disney Productions as a promotion for its 1953 film Peter Pan. Users of Colgate-Palmolive's "Peter Pan Beauty Bar with Chlorophyll" could obtain the map by mailing in three soap wrappers and fifteen cents.

In the Disney-franchise version of Never Land, many non-canon locales are added which appear variously throughout different installments, as well as adding or giving names to implied locations within Barrie's original Neverland. These locales include:

- Cannibal Cove/Tiki Forest – A jungle environment, original to the Disney franchise, filled with monkeys, parrots, boars, cobras, bees and a "host of evil traps." It is occupied by a tribe reminiscent of both African and indigenous Pacific-Islander cultures. This location appears regularly in Disney Junior's animated series Jake and the Never Land Pirates
- The Neverseas are the seas around Neverland in Disney's Tinker Bell films. Some small islands can be found in it, and it seems that it can communicate with the real seas, as a normal ship comes across the path of a young James Hook in The Pirate Fairy
- Pixie Hollow is where Tinker Bell and her tiny fairy friends live and dwell in the Disney Fairies franchise. (See also Pixie Hollow, a Disneyland attraction based on it.)
- Never Land Plains – A location where the Indians reside
- Skull Rock – A location where the "pirates are said to hide their booty."
- Crocodile Creek – A swamp environment where the Crocodile lives

==== Hook (1991) ====
In Steven Spielberg's 1991 film Hook, the pirates occupy a small port town peppered with merchant shopfronts, warehouses, hotels, pubs, and an improvised baseball field, and many ships and boats of varying sizes and kinds fill the harbour. The Home Underground has also been replaced by an intricate tree house structure, which is home to a larger number of Lost Boys. In certain areas, the territory surrounding the tree house has its own unique weather (i.e; spring, summer, autumn, winter).

The Mermaids' Lagoon is directly connected to the Lost Boys' tree house structure by a giant clam-shell pulley system. The Home Underground is discovered buried and forgotten by an adult Peter in the film, underneath the new home of the Lost Boys. Neither the Indians nor their territory appear in the film, though they are mentioned by Hook during a conversation with Smee.

==== Other ====
The Black Castle, which is referred to in the 2003 film, is an old ruined and abandoned castle, decorated with stone dragons and gargoyles. It is one of the places where Tiger Lily is taken by Captain James Hook. This sequence is based on the Marooner's Rock sequence in the original play and book: like Disney's non-canon 'Skull Rock', Black Castle replaces Marooners's Rock in this film.

Neverpeak Mountain is the huge mountain that is right in the middle of Neverland. According to Peter Pan in Scarlet, when a child is on top of Neverpeak Mountain, he or she can see over anyone and anything and can see beyond belief.

The Maze of Regrets is a maze in Peter Pan in Scarlet where all the mothers of the Lost Boys go to find their boys.

== Inhabitants ==
=== Fairies ===
Fairies are arguably the most important magical inhabitants of the Neverland, and its primary magic users. A property of their nature is the production and possession of fairy dust, the magic material which enables flying for all characters except Peter, who was taught to fly by the birds, and later by the fairies in Kensington Gardens. The only-named fairy is Tinker Bell, Peter Pan's companion, whose name alludes to her profession as a 'tinker', or fixer of pots and pans. Tinker Bell is essentially a household fairy, but far from benign. Her exotic, fiery nature, and capacity for evil and mischief, due to fairies being too small to feel more than one type of emotion at any one time, is reminiscent of the more hostile fairies encountered by Peter in Kensington Gardens.

In Barrie's play and novel, the roles of fairies are brief: they are allies to the Lost Boys against the pirates, the source of fairy dust and where they act as "guides" for parties travelling to and from Neverland. They are also responsible for the collection of abandoned or lost babies from the Mainland to the Neverland. The roles and activities of the fairies are more elaborate in Peter Pan in Kensington Gardens (1906): they occupy kingdoms in the Gardens and at night "mischief children who are locked in after dark" to their deaths or entertain them before they return to their parents the following day; and they guard the paths to a "Proto-Neverland" called the birds' island. These fairies are more regal and engage in a variety of human activities in a magical fashion. They have courts; can grant wishes to children; and have a practical relationship with the birds, which is however "strained by differences." They are portrayed as dangerous, whimsical and extremely clever, but quite hedonistic. After forgetting how to fly, unable to be taught by the birds, Peter is given the power to fly again by the fairies.

Barrie writes that "when the first baby laughed for the first time, its laugh broke into a thousand pieces, ... and that was the beginning of fairies." Neverland's fairies can be killed whenever someone says they don't believe in fairies, suggesting that the race of fairies is finite and exhaustible. When dying from Hook's poison, Tinker Bell is saved when Peter and other children and adults across the Neverlands and Mainland call out "I do believe in fairies, I do, I do," so their deaths are not necessarily permanent. At the end of Barrie's novel Wendy asks Peter about Tinker Bell, whom he has forgotten and he answers, "I expect she is no more."

The Disney Fairies–Peter Pan franchise has elaborated on aspects of Barrie's fairy mythology. The Never Fairies (and associated sparrow men) live in Pixie Hollow, located in the heart of Neverland. As stated in the Tinker Bell film, after the baby's first laugh enters a flower, it breaks the flower into numerous pieces (the seeds), any piece that can blow with the wind and survive the trip to Pixie Hollow becomes a fairy, who then learns their specific talent.

=== Birds ===
In the novel and the play, between the flight from the Mainland (reality) and the Neverland, they are relatively simple animals which provide entertainment, instruction and some limited guidance to flyers. These birds are described as unable to sight its shores, "even, carrying maps and consulting them at windy corners."

The Never Bird saves Peter from drowning when he is stranded on Marooners' Rock, by giving him her nest which he uses as a sailing vessel.

In Barrie's Peter Pan in Kensington Gardens, birds have a far more prominent role on a proto-Neverland called the Birds' Island. On the island, the various birds speak bird-language, described as being related to fairy language which can be understood by young humans, who used to be birds. The birds are responsible for bringing human babies into the Mainland, whose human parents send folded paper boats along the serpentine "with 'boy' or 'girl' and 'thin' or 'fat' (and so on) written", indicating to the official birds which species to send back to transform into human children, who are described as having an "itch on their backs where their wings used to be" and that their warbles are fairy/bird talk.

=== Lost Boys ===
The Lost Boys are a tribe of "children who fall out of their prams when the nurse is not looking;" having not been claimed by humans in seven days, they were collected by the fairies and flown to the Neverland. There are no 'lost girls' because, as Peter explains, girls are much too clever to fall out of their prams and be lost in this manner.

There are six Lost Boys: Tootles, Nibs, Slightly, Curly and the Twins. They are not permitted to fly by Peter, as it is a sign of his authority and uniqueness. They live in tree houses and caves, wear animal skins, have spears and bows and arrows, and live for adventure. They are a formidable fighting force despite their youth and they make war with the pirates, although they seem to enjoy a harmonious existence with the other inhabitants of Neverland.

=== Pirates ===
The crew of the Pirate ship Jolly Roger have taken up residence off-shore, and are widely feared throughout Neverland. How they came to be in Neverland is unclear. Their captain is the ruthless James Hook, named after the hook in place of his right hand.

=== "Redskins" ===
There is a tribe of wigwam-dwelling Native Americans who live on the island, referred to by Barrie as "Redskins" or as the Piccaninny tribe. Their chief is Great Big Little Panther, whose daughter Tiger Lily has a crush on Peter Pan. The Piccaninny tribe are known to make ferocious and deadly war against Captain Hook and his pirates, but their connection with the Lost Boys is more lighthearted. For "many moons", the two groups have captured each other, only to promptly release the captives, as though it were a game.

=== Mermaids ===
Mermaids live in the lagoon. They enjoy the company of Peter Pan but keep their distance from everyone else on the island, including the fairies. They are not sociable creatures and do not speak nor interact with outsiders. They are malevolent, hedonistic and frivolous; yet they sing and play "mermaid games" in which they "rise to the surface in extraordinary numbers to play with their bubbles," "made in rainbow water." They also "love to bask out on Marooners' Rock, combing their hair in a lazy way."

At first glance, Wendy is enchanted by their beauty, but finds them vain and irritating, as they would "splash her with their tails, not accidentally, but intentionally" when she attempted to steal a closer look. Their homes are "coral caves underneath the waves" to which they retire at sunset and rising tide, as well as in anticipation of storms. When one mermaid tries to pull Wendy into the water and drown her, Peter intervenes and hisses – rather than crows – at them and they quickly dive into the water and disappear. Barrie describes the mermaids' "haunting" transformation at the "turn of the moon" while "uttering strange wailing cries" at night as the lagoon becomes a very "dangerous place for mortals". The Mermaids' Lagoon is a favourite "adventure" for the children, and where they take their "midday meal". Peter gives Wendy one of the mermaids' combs as a gift.

The 2003 Peter Pan film briefly describes mermaids as different from those in traditional story books, but as "dark creatures in touch with all things mysterious," and who will drown humans who get too close, but do not harm Peter who seems to be the only one who can speak the mermaids' language. They always seem to know Hook's whereabouts on the island at any given time and tell Peter.

=== Animals ===
Animals (referred to as beasts) live throughout Neverland, such as bears, tigers, lions, wolves, flamingoes and crocodiles. In Barrie's original novel, these "beasts" hunt the Piccaninny tribe, who hunt the Pirates, who are themselves hunting the Lost Boys, who in turn hunt the beasts, creating a chain of prey and murder in the Neverland that only ends when one party stops or slows down, or when Peter redirects the Lost Boys to other tasks and activities. Like all the agencies of the Neverland, the animals do not need to eat, nor are they eaten when killed, nor do they reproduce (as they enjoy the same immortality as all other inhabitants), so their presence is a paradox. There are also a variety of birds, whose societies are present in the proto-Neverland described in Barrie's Peter Pan in Kensington Gardens.

=== Other residents ===
Other inhabitants of Neverland are suggested by Barrie in his original novel, such as a "small old lady with a hooked nose", "gnomes who are mostly tailors", and princes "with six elder brothers" – reminiscent of European fairy tales. Some locations are briefly described without inhabitants, but the narrator hints at their former presence, such as a "hut fast going to decay".

In a Japanese anime series, The Adventures of Peter Pan (1989), the individual characters of the pirates, "redskins", and mermaids are expanded, and new characters such as the schizophrenic spellcaster princess Luna and the witch Sinistra are added.

== See also ==
- Wonderland (fictional country)
- Looking-glass world
- Land of Oz
- Middle-earth
- Narnia
