= Captain Hook =

Captain James Hook
- Peter Pan character
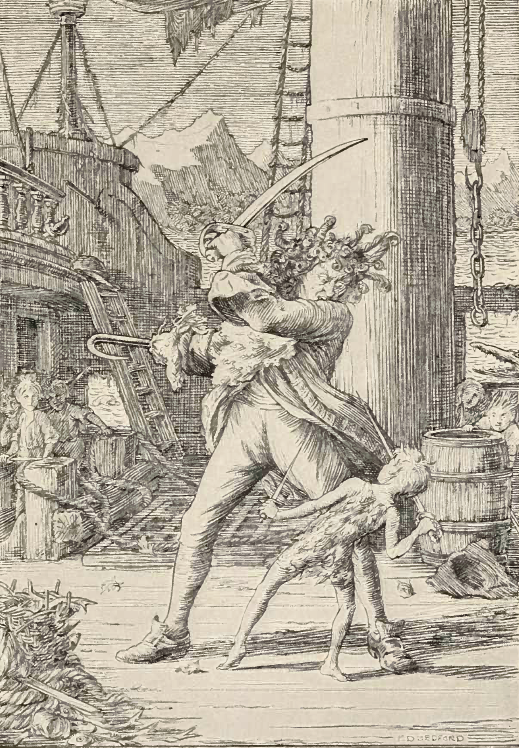
- 1912 illustration by Francis Donkin Bedford
- First appearance: Peter Pan (1904)
- Created by: J. M. Barrie
- Portrayed by: Gerald du Maurier (1904 first stage production)

In-universe information
- Title: Captain
- Occupation: Pirate
- Nationality: English

Captain James Hook is the main antagonist of J. M. Barrie's 1904 play Peter Pan; or, The Boy Who Wouldn't Grow Up and its various adaptations, in which he is Peter Pan's archenemy. The character is a pirate captain of the brig Jolly Roger. His two principal fears are the sight of his own blood (supposedly an unnatural colour) and the crocodile who pursues him after having previously eaten Captain Hook's hand, which had been cut off by Peter Pan. An iron hook that replaced his severed hand has given the pirate his name.

== Creation of the character ==
Hook did not appear in early drafts of the play, wherein the capricious and coercive Peter Pan was closest to being portrayed as a villain. Hook was created for a front-cloth scene (a cloth flown well downstage in front of which short scenes are played, while big scene changes are "silently" carried out upstage) depicting the children's journey home. Later, Barrie expanded the scene, on the premise that children were fascinated by pirates. He expanded the role of the captain as the play developed. The character was originally cast to be played by Dorothea Baird, the actress playing Mary Darling, but Gerald du Maurier, already playing George Darling (and the brother of Sylvia Llewelyn Davies), persuaded Barrie to let him take the additional role instead, a casting tradition since replicated in many stage and film productions of the Peter Pan story.

According to A. N. Wilson, Barrie "openly acknowledged Hook and his obsession with the crocodile was an English version of Ahab", and there are other borrowings from Melville.

== Biography of the character ==
Barrie states in the novel: "Hook was not his true name. To reveal who he really was would even at this date set the country in a blaze." He is said to be "Blackbeard's bo'sun" and "the only man of whom Barbecue was afraid". (In Robert Louis Stevenson's Treasure Island, one of the names Long John Silver goes by is Barbecue.)

In the play, it is implied that Hook attended Eton College and Balliol College, Oxford, and his final words are "Floreat Etona", Eton's motto. In the novel, Hook's last words are a similarly upper-class "bad form", in disapproval of the way Peter Pan beats him by throwing him overboard. He also has a yellow blood disorder.

The book relates that Peter Pan began the ongoing rivalry between them by feeding the pirate's hand to a crocodile. After getting a taste of Hook, the crocodile pursues him relentlessly, but the ticking clock it has also swallowed warns Hook of its presence.

== Appearances ==
=== Peter Pan (play) and Peter and Wendy (novel) ===
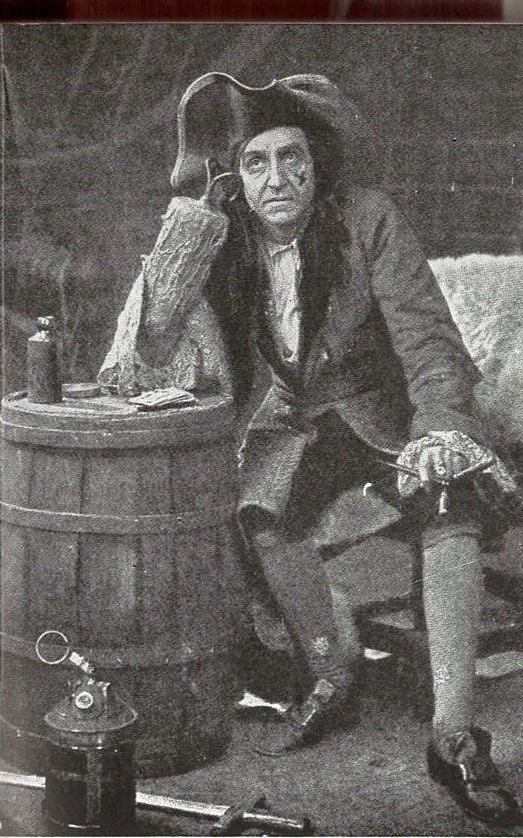
Robb Harwood as Captain Hook (1907–1909)

Hook is described as "cadaverous" and "blackavised", with "eyes which were of the blue of the forget-me-not" ("save when he was plunging his hook into you, at which time two red spots appeared in them and lit them up horribly") and long dark curls resembling "black candles". He is a very skilled swordsman. In many pantomime performances of Peter Pan, Hook's hair is a wig and is accompanied by thick bushy eyebrows and moustache. The hook is fixed to his right hand (often changed to the left hand in film adaptations) and is used as a weapon. He is also described as having a "handsome countenance" and an "elegance of ... diction" – "even when he [is] swearing". Barrie describes "an attire associated with the name of Charles II, having heard it said in some earlier period of his career that he bore a strange resemblance to the ill-fated Stuarts". Hook's cigar holder enables him to smoke two cigars at once. Barrie also stated in "Captain Hook at Eton" that he was, "in a word, the handsomest man I have ever seen, though, at the same time, perhaps slightly disgusting". Although Hook is callous and bloodthirsty, it makes it clear that these qualities make him a magnificent pirate and "not wholly unheroic".

=== Disney version ===
Captain James Hook
- Captain Hook as he appears in the Walt Disney version of Peter Pan
- First appearance: Peter Pan (1953)
- Created by: Walt Disney Animation Studios

In-universe information
- Occupation: Pirate
- Affiliation: Disney Villains
- Children: Harriet Hook (daughter; in Descendants); CJ Hook (daughter; in Descendants); Harry Hook (son; in Descendants); Hazel Hook (daughter; in Descendants)
- Voiced by: Hans Conried (1953 film); Corey Burton (1977–present); Tom Hiddleston (The Pirate Fairy); Kevin Michael Richardson (Plusaversary and Welcome to the Club)
- Portrayed by: Jude Law (Peter Pan & Wendy); Joshua Colley (Descendants: The Rise of Red)

In the animated film Peter Pan (1953), Captain Hook is a far more comical villain than the original character: he is seen as a vain and dastardly coward with a childish temper who is prone to crying out in terror. During the film's early development, the story department analysed Hook's character as "a fop... Yet very mean, to the point of being murderous. This combination of traits should cause plenty of amusement whenever he talks or acts".

Frank Thomas was the directing animator of Hook. According to Disney's Platinum release bonus features, Hook was modeled after Charles II of England. One director insisted that Hook should be a darker villain with no comedic traits; but this was refused for fear of frightening a juvenile audience, and Hook became a comical villain, equally matched with Peter Pan.

Actor Hans Conried set the tone for Disney's interpretation of Hook, as he was the original voice for the Captain, as well as, in the tradition of the stage play, Mr. Darling, and performed live-action reference for the two characters. In subsequent Disney animation, Hook is voiced by Corey Burton.

Hook seeks revenge on Peter Pan for having fed the crocodile his left hand and refuses to leave Neverland prior to this revenge. Throughout the film, Hook is supported by Mr. Smee. After promising Tinker Bell not to lay a finger (or a hook) on Peter Pan, he plants a bomb in Peter's hideout (instead of Barrie's vial of poison). At the conclusion of the film, Hook is chased by the crocodile into the distance, with the rest of the crew trying to save Hook. Walt Disney insisted on keeping Hook alive, as he said: "The audience will get to liking Hook, and they don't want to see him killed."

==== Other film appearances ====
In the sequel Return to Never Land (2002), Hook mistakes Wendy's daughter Jane for Wendy and uses her as bait to lure Peter Pan to his death. After this fails, he promises to take Jane home if she will help him find the island's treasure, and "not to harm a single hair on Peter Pan's head". This last promise is kept when he pulls a single hair from Peter's head, declaring "the rest of him is mine". At the end of the film, he and the crew are pursued into the distance by a giant octopus.

Captain Hook is one of the Disney Villains who have a main focus in the direct-to-video anthology film Once Upon a Halloween.

Captain Hook's origins are explored in the Disney Fairies film The Pirate Fairy, in which he is voiced by Tom Hiddleston. In the story, a young James years before he lost his hand, pretended to be a pirate ship's cabin boy and befriended the rebellious fairy Zarina, who had left Pixie Hollow after being dismissed as a dust-keeper when her unauthorised experiments with pixie dust led to a disaster. James foresaw the great potential of the pixie dust and let Zarina think she had the authority over pirates.

In The Simpsons short film Plusaversary, Captain Hook makes a non-speaking cameo appearance as one of the guests at the party in Moe's Tavern. In Welcome to the Club, Captain Hook (voiced by Kevin Michael Richardson) appears along with other Disney Villains trying to convince Lisa Simpson how fun it is to be a villain. He also appears in the short film The Most Wonderful Time of the Year.

Jude Law portrays Captain Hook in the live-action film Peter Pan & Wendy, which adapts material from the 1953 animated film. Unlike the animated version, his hook is in his right arm. Unlike Barrie's original play and later Peter Pan adaptations, in which the same actor play Hook and Mr. Darling, the latter's role is performed by a different actor, Alan Tudyk. In this version, Hook is revealed to be an old friend of Peter's and the first Lost Boy, but he left Neverland because he missed his mother. Years later, he returned to Neverland as a pirate, being rejected by Peter because he had grown up.

Joshua Colley plays a teen Hook in the live-action film Descendants: The Rise of Red, from the Descendants franchise. His teenage son Harry (portrayed by Thomas Doherty) appears in the previous films of the franchise Descendants 2 and Descendants 3, Captain Hook being only mentioned.

==== Television series ====
Captain Hook made a special guest cameo on Raw Toonage in the episode hosted by Don Karnage (air pirate of TaleSpin), wherein he challenged Karnage to a sword fight for a treasure chest and won.

Hook also appeared frequently on House of Mouse, and its two direct-to-video films Mickey's Magical Christmas: Snowed in at the House of Mouse and Mickey's House of Villains, acting as a major antagonist in the latter.

In the Disney Junior series Jake and the Never Land Pirates, Hook serves as the main antagonist, with his mother, Mama Hook, herself exclusive to the Disney Junior series, keeping him "honest" if he gets tempted.

==== Video games ====
===== Kingdom Hearts series =====
Captain Hook (フック船長, Fukku Senchō) appears in the video game series Kingdom Hearts. He is voiced in Japanese by Chikao Ohtsuka until Birth by Sleep, after which he is voiced by Naoya Uchida. His English voice actor is Corey Burton.

- In the first game, Hook takes Riku with him where Kairi is being held. Hook does not like Riku's bossiness and regrets taking him along. Nonetheless, he follows his orders, as Riku has control over the Heartless and will likely unleash them on him should he disobey. When Sora, Donald, and Goofy arrive in Neverland, Riku throws them in the hold, where they meet and escape with Peter Pan. He is searching for Wendy, who Hook kidnapped due to believing that she was a Princess of Heart. Riku tells Hook that Wendy is not a Princess of Heart, irritating him. After defeating the Heartless, Sora fights a copy of himself summoned by Riku. After confronting Hook and learning that Riku took Kairi to Hollow Bastion, Sora and company are forced to surrender when Hook holds Tinker Bell hostage. When the crocodile appears, Hook flees while telling Smee to have their prisoners walk the plank. Peter returns to save Sora before imitating Smee to lure Hook to the deck, resulting in him being thrown overboard and chased away by the crocodile.
- In Kingdom Hearts: Chain of Memories, Hook appears as a figment of Sora's memories.
- In Kingdom Hearts 358/2 Days, Pete manipulates Hook into creating the Ruler of the Sky, a bird-like Heartless that Roxas defeats.
- Hook appears in the prequel Kingdom Hearts Birth by Sleep, where he tricks Terra into attempting to kill Peter Pan for him. He kidnaps Tinker Bell and takes Mickey Mouse's Star Shard, but is defeated by Ventus and thrown into the water, where the crocodile chases him off.

===== Epic Mickey =====
An animatronic version of Captain Hook appears in Epic Mickey, wherein he has been converting his crew into animatronic, cyborg version of themselves (referred to in the game as Beetleworx) and is waging an attack against the non-converted pirates. Smee requests that Mickey Mouse find a way to save Hook and stop this machine that is turning pirates into Beetleworx. Players can either fight Hook by themselves and earn a thinner upgrade (and a "bad ending") or free the Sprite and have Pete Pan (a version of Pete dressed as Peter Pan) defeat him and earn a paint upgrade (and a "good ending" showing Pete Pan and Captain Hook in a duel). In Epic Mickey 2: The Power of Two, Hook has disappeared entirely, leaving his crew leaderless and having been run out of Tortooga by Blackbeard and Pete Pan having joined up with the Mad Doctor after losing his purpose. Some of Hook's clothes and items have been left behind in Ventureland, which the crew members seek to assert their authority to take over leadership of the other pirates and lead them to take back their home.

The Cartoon World's version of Hook appears in Epic Mickey: Power of Illusion as the first boss, having fallen under the control of Mizrabel to fight Mickey. Upon his defeat, he comes to his senses and offers his help to Mickey's quest to bring the toons back to the Cartoon World.

===== Other games =====
- Captain Hook appears as a boss in the Japanese version of Mickey Mousecapade, with Pete replacing him in the English version.
- Captain Hook is one of the main antagonists in Disney's Villains' Revenge, voiced by Corey Burton.
- Captain Hook appears as an unlockable playable character in Disney Magic Kingdoms.
- Captain Hook appears as a playable character in Disney Heroes: Battle Mode.
- An alternate universe version of Captain Hook appears as a playable character in Disney Mirrorverse.
- Captain Hook appears as a playable character in Fortnite.

==== Attractions and live events ====
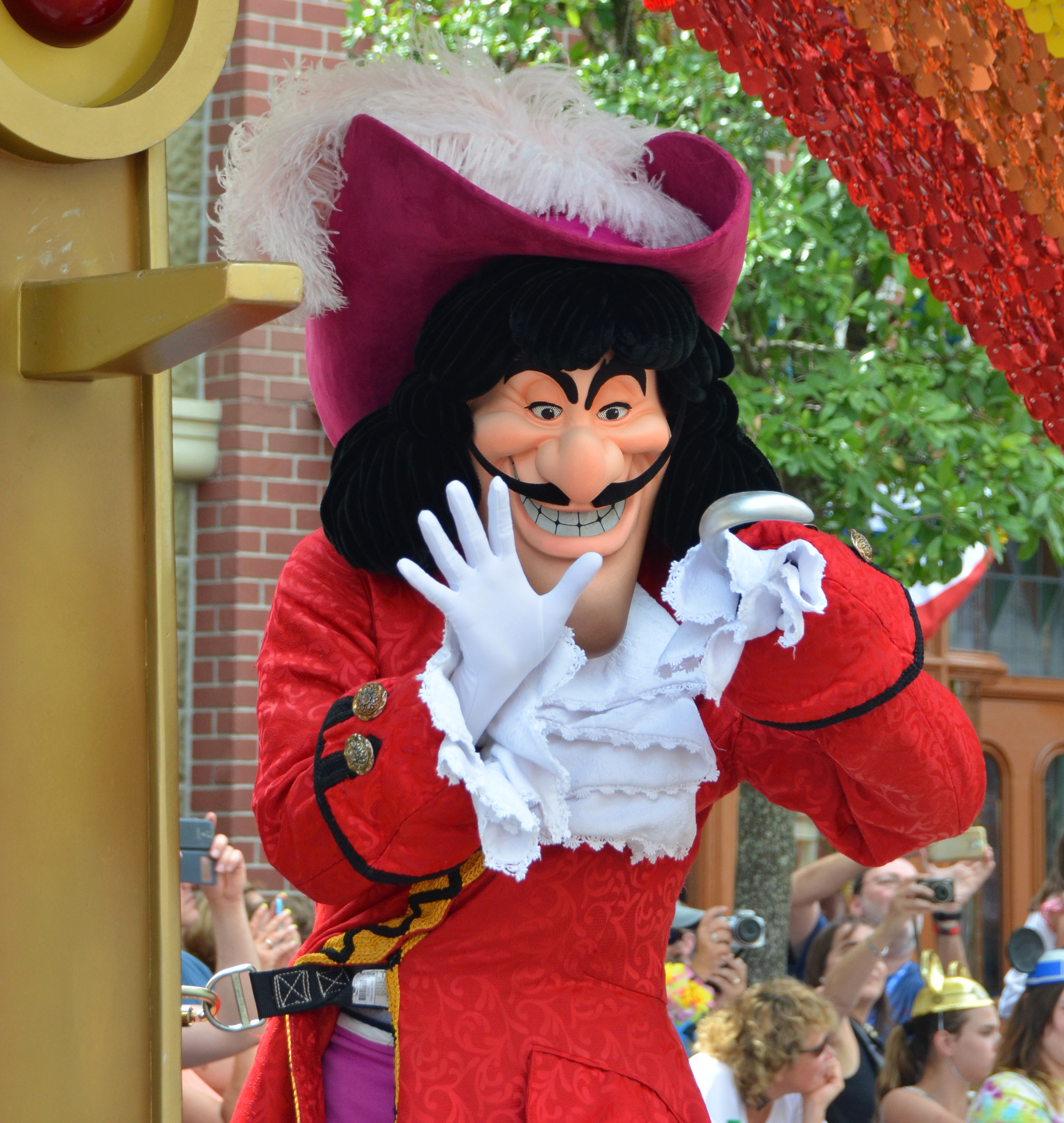
Disney's version of Captain Hook as a meetable character in the Disney Parks.

Captain Hook appears at the Walt Disney Parks and Resorts as a meetable character along with Mr. Smee alternating between Fantasyland and Adventureland. He also appears as a figure during the dark ride Peter Pan's Flight.

In Fantasmic! at Disneyland, there is a scene in which we see Captain Hook and Peter Pan duelling aboard the Jolly Roger (portrayed by the Sailing Ship Columbia). This is replaced by a short re-enactment of Disney's Pocahontas at Disney's Hollywood Studios.

At Disney World's Dream-Along with Mickey show, Hook, along with Smee, is one of the villains that crashes Mickey's party. This happens when Peter and Wendy appear to make Goofy's dream for some adventure come true and play a game of "Pretend to Be Pirates" with Donald Duck, who pretends to be the captain until the real Hook appears and challenges Peter to a duel. At first, Hook's appearance seems to take place for no reason other than to add some action to the show but is revealed to actually be working for Maleficent, who is insulted after not being invited to the party. He is defeated by Mickey Mouse, who leads the audience in a chant of "Dreams come true!", and scares off the villains.

At the Disney Villains Mix and Mingle Halloween Dance Party at Mickey's Not-So-Scary Halloween Party, Hook is summoned up by Maleficent along with the other villains, and co-hosts along with her, revealed by him being the only one of the villains besides her to sing and also being the villain that dances with her.

Captain Hook was also featured in the Disney on Ice 2013 show 'Let's Party' as part of the Halloween celebration section, which takes the format of a party hosted by Jack Skellington where all the 'main' Disney villains attend (the Evil Queen and Jafar being two other notable villains in the scene) and they plan to capture Mickey Mouse to plunge everyone into unhappiness.

==== Printed media ====
Occasionally, Hook appears in the Scrooge McDuck universe of comic books as the nemesis of Moby Duck, a whaler cousin of Donald Duck.

In the Kingdom Keepers series book Disney at Dawn (2008), Captain Hook was snooping around Ariel's Grotto, having been sent by the Overtakers in investigate the meaning in Jess playing songs over the park speakers.

In the Descendants franchise novels Isle of the Lost (2015) and its sequel Rise of the Isle of the Lost (2017), Captain Hook appears as one of the villains who live imprisoned on the titular island. He is also the father of Harriet (eldest daughter), Harry (middle son), and CJ (youngest daughter).

In the Pirates of the Caribbean novel Pirates of the Caribbean: The Price of Freedom by A. C. Crispin, Captain Hook is mentioned as "James" in conversation, confirmed by Crispin to be a Disney "in" joke.

=== In film ===
==== Peter Pan (1924 film) ====
Captain Hook appears in Peter Pan (1924), portrayed by Ernest Torrence.

==== Hook (1991 film) ====
Captain James Hook
- Created by: Steven Spielberg
- Portrayed by: Dustin Hoffman

In-universe information
- Nickname: Hook
- Gender: Male
- Occupation: Pirate

Captain Hook appears in Hook, portrayed by Dustin Hoffman. Looking for purpose in his own life Hook kidnaps the children of the adult Peter to lure his arch-enemy back to Neverland and gives the middle-aged man three days to rekindle his spirit. Hook has been left feeling depressed and suicidal since Peter Pan forfeited his eternal youth and left Neverland to start a family with Wendy's granddaughter Moira and took on the new identity of Peter Banning (Robin Williams). After his initial arrival in Neverland, Banning makes an unsuccessful first attempt to get Hook to release his children by offering money but Hook refuses, shooting Peter's checkbook. Hook worries he has nothing left to accomplish; he has long since killed the crocodile and made a quiet clock tower out of its corpse. Despite killing the crocodile, he remains terrified of the sound of ticking clocks and has become increasingly paranoid of the crocodile coming back, often destroying clocks to cope. At Smee's suggestion, Hook attempts to persuade Peter's children that their father never loved them, in order to coerce them to stay in Neverland. He is successful with Jack, Peter's son, who soon sees Hook as the attentive father figure that Peter has never been, and Hook eventually sees Jack as a potential heir. Peter's daughter, Maggie, mistrusts Hook immediately and refuses to be swayed, reminding Hook of her father's past defiances. Hook decides to hold Maggie hostage until Peter's failure to rescue her ruins her faith in him. This backfires when Peter and the Lost Boys rescue her immediately. Jack sees Hook stab Rufio to death in a duel and realises how much his father cares for the Lost Boys, rejecting the murderous Hook and embracing Peter once again. As Peter leaves the ship with his children and the Lost Boys, Hook orders him to come back. Maggie tells him off, stating Hook needs a mother to straighten his bad attitude. After Hook vows to kidnap future generations of children in Peter's family, Peter and Hook engage in a final duel amidst a circle of Lost Boys, Peter taunting Hook about the idea that the ticking clocks he fears are not reminders of the crocodile, but a reminder of time ticking away. After a close call where Tinker Bell deflects an attack with the hook, the crocodile clock tower seemingly comes to "life" and eats Hook when it falls on top of him.

Hook's missing hand is his left and his stump takes other attachments, including a baseball mitt and a pointer. He dresses very elegantly in a gold-trimmed red coat, matching hat, and a wig that hides his balding head. He wears a ceremonial captain's sword at his side, but uses a proper duelling sword when fighting Rufio and Peter. Hook's physical appearance in the film is heavily influenced by Disney's portrayal, though with more elaborate clothing trim and his moustache is curled, shaped like a hook. He is closer to Barrie's characterisation as a gentleman pirate than in Disney's version; for instance, he frequently describes certain behaviours as "good form" or "bad form" (although he is willing to violate these rules when it suits him, such as trying to stab Peter in the back during their climatic duel). Hoffman claimed to have based the character's voice and mannerisms on conservative columnist William F. Buckley Jr.

In addition to playing the titular character, Hoffman also provided the airline pilot's announcement in the scene where the Bannings fly from San Francisco to London for Christmas, as a reference to the traditional element of casting one actor in a dual-role of Captain Hook and George Darling in the original play.

==== Peter Pan (2003 film) ====
Captain James Hook
- Created by: P.J. Hogan
- Portrayed by: Jason Isaacs

In-universe information
- Nickname: Hook
- Gender: Male
- Occupation: Pirate

Captain Hook appears in Peter Pan (2003), portrayed by Jason Isaacs. In the climactic duel, he learns to fly, almost defeating Peter Pan, but the Lost Boys' taunts weaken the enthusiasm needed to fly, and he falls into the crocodile's mouth, accepting his fate.

==== Shrek film series ====
Captain Hook appears in the Shrek franchise. In Shrek 2, he plays piano in the Poison Apple Tavern, singing "Little Drop of Poison" by Tom Waits and "People Ain't No Good" by Nick Cave. In Shrek the Third., he appears as a secondary antagonist voiced by Ian McShane.

==== Pan (2015 film) ====
Captain Hook appears in Pan, portrayed by Garrett Hedlund. He works with Peter Pan to escape from Blackbeard's mines in Neverland and joins forces with the native tribe. Although initially only interested in leaving Neverland, Hook is attracted to Tiger Lily (Rooney Mara) and assists her and Peter in personally dueling Boatswain Bishop as Tiger Lily fights Blackbeard during the final confrontation in the fairy kingdom. At the film's conclusion, he joins Peter and Tiger Lily in rescuing other children including Peter's confidant Nibs from Peter's old orphanage back in London. Hook in this film is different from the original character, and is portrayed as a pioneer-era American without any connection with Eton, Blackbeard, or piracy in general.

==== Come Away ====
Captain Hook appears in Come Away, portrayed by David Gyasi. This version is a ruthless pawnbroker and lower crime lord who is the son of the Mad Hatter, the paternal grandfather of Alice and Peter Pan, making CJ their paternal uncle and the paternal great-uncle of the Darling children, Wendy, Michael and John (through Alice who here replaces Mary as their mother). CJ takes care of his father who is showing senility and thus only recognizes Jack; Alice and Peter's father as his son who CJ has always resented having grown up in his older brother's shadow. He also seems to blame Jack for the death of David who CJ seemed to view as his favorite nephew, so when Jack comes to his brother to help call off various debt collectors, CJ showing loyalty to his crime lord superiors crushes Jack's right hand leaving it to be amputated. Peter in response seeks out a group of street urchins to then rob his uncle of the gold coins he's safe guarding for the various criminal underworld factions before cutting off CJ's left hand in a sword duel (when CJ catches them in the act) before fleeing to parts unknown pursued by CJ and his cohorts.

==== Wendy ====
Captain Hook appears in Wendy, portrayed by Kevin Pugh, with Gavin Naquin portraying his younger self. Wendy here has two twin older brothers, James and Douglas, who are taken to Neverland by Peter, here made ageless and untouched by time after a deity shared her powers with him to save him from the disaster that killed his family. This deity, known as "Mother", stops the children in (this particular) Neverland from growing up provided they retain faith in her; otherwise, she lets them rapidly age into middle-aged adults. When Douglas seems to drown, James starts losing faith and his right hand begins to age prematurely, prompting Peter to amputate it. Despite this, James continues to grow old, and rallies the other adults to kill and consume "Mother" in an effort to retain their lost youth with a restored fishing boat. When Wendy discovers that Douglas survived, both help Peter revive "Mother" after she is harpooned and temporarily dies. James, now with a makeshift hook in place of his right hand, can no longer return home with his siblings and their friends, so stays to play with Peter as his new "enemy" Captain Hook, thereby allowing him to live out the rest of his days with the spirit of a child.

==== Lost Girls ====
Iain Glen plays Hook in the 2022 film The Lost Girls.

==== Peter Pan's Neverland Nightmare ====
Captain Hook appears in Peter Pan's Neverland Nightmare, portrayed by Charity Kase. In the film, he was abducted by Peter 15 years ago, and is depicted as a heavily mutilated individual, chained and his hand replaced with a hook.

==== Hook (2025 film) ====
Captain Hook is the main antagonist of Andrea M. Catinelli's British indie horror film Hook, portrayed by Stephen Staley. In the film, James is a drug addict who has an obsession with Wendy. After killing her brother and Tiger Lily, James has his hand chopped off by Peter. Eighteen years pass and before going on a birthday trip with her friends, Peter and Wendy's daughter Lily discovers the shocking truth that James Hook is her birth father. Hook has escaped police custody and sets out for revenge.

=== In television ===
==== Peter Pan (1976 musical) ====
Captain Hook appears in Peter Pan (1976), portrayed by Danny Kaye.

==== Peter Pan – The Animated Series (no boken) ====
Captain Hook appears in Peter Pan: The Animated Series, voiced by Chikao Ohtsuka. This version's personality is far closer to the original character from Barrie's novel. Apart from wanting to destroy Pan, he is also eager to become Neverland's first king. Hook has a second hook-hand which resembles a crab claw.

==== Peter Pan and the Pirates ====
Captain Hook appears in Peter Pan and the Pirates, voiced by Tim Curry. This version harkens closer to the original depiction of the character, being ruthless and cunning.

==== Funky Fables ====
Captain Hook appears in Funky Fables, voiced by Garry Chalk.

==== The Children's Party at the Palace ====
Captain Hook appears in Children's Party at the Palace, portrayed by Anthony Head.

==== Once Upon a Time ====
Captain Hook appears in Once Upon a Time, portrayed by Colin O'Donoghue, starting with the second season.

Hook is born Killian Jones, who becomes captain of the Jolly Roger after his brother's death. His hand is cut off by the dark trickster Rumpelstiltskin as revenge for Hook running away with his wife. In order to find a way to kill Rumplestiltskin, Hook travels to Neverland, where he spends over 100 years before escaping back to the Enchanted Forest. Hook teams up with Cora, the Queen of Hearts, and they travel to the Land Without Magic after the curse is broken. Over the following seasons, Hook is gradually reformed into one of the main protagonists, and eventually marries Emma Swan.

==== Neverland (TV miniseries) ====
Captain Hook appears in Neverland, portrayed by Rhys Ifans. He is introduced as "Jimmy", a fencing teacher and leader of a small group of juvenile pickpockets including Peter Pan with whom he has developed a father-son relationship (that over time shatters completely due to events in Neverland culminating in the demise of Peter's confidant). Jimmy is seeking a mysterious orb, which Peter and his gang have discovered unbeknownst to him. In the course of the miniseries, "Jimmy" in avertedly causes Peter's right hand boy to die, where it is then revealed that "Jimmy" actually killed Peter's father because he was in love with Peter's mother, with the watch that Hook owns having once belonged to Peter's father; the watch is lost with Hook's hand in their final confrontation when the crocodile swallows both.

==== Peter Pan Live! (2014 TV special) ====
Captain Hook appears in Peter Pan Live!, portrayed by Christopher Walken. Compared to the 1954 musical on which it was based, this show sought to "strengthen and deepen" the portrayal of Captain Hook. Hook and his pirate crew perform songs from the original musical, such as "Hook's Tango", in addition to new songs such as "Vengeance" and "Only Pretend".

==== Peter and Wendy (2015 TV film) ====
Captain Hook appears in Peter and Wendy, portrayed by Stanley Tucci. Hook is shown to be just as being somewhat equally naïve as Peter Pan; since this disliking of children is due to his own somewhat turbulent childhood; where he was sent away to Eton by an unloving family so therefore in some ways he needs Wendy as much as Peter. He even reads out aloud to crewmembers his recounts of his hated school days but still refuses to believe his family didn't love him. He is shown to punish his crew for the slightest infractions killing one for accidentally spitting on his boots. Culminating in an ending similar to the book, only this time the crocodile drags him through an opening after bursting through the bottom hull to seize him, with said hook breaking off while James uses it to cling to the side of the hull.

=== In literature ===
==== Peter Pan in Scarlet ====
Geraldine McCaughrean's authorized sequel to Peter Pan gives Peter a new nemesis, while bringing back the old favourite.

Ravello, a circus man in a constantly ragged woollen coat, volunteers to become Peter's valet in the search for the treasure. Ravello provides a red coat (that formerly belonged to Hook) and a bad influence, influencing Peter increasingly to become more and more like Captain Hook. He sees himself not as a living person; he never sleeps and eats only egg. He is revealed in the middle of the book to be the old James Hook, who escaped the crocodile when the animal's stomach contractions broke the vial of poison Hook kept with him at all times. The poison killed the crocodile, and Hook used his hook to claw his way out, but he was disfigured by the stomach acid into an uglier man with a scarred visage—vastly different in appearance from the noble pirate. He then assumed a new identity of Ravello, owner of a travelling circus, complete with lions, tigers, and bears.

A clue to Ravello's true identity is given when one of the Lost Boys asks Ravello his name: he thinks for a while as if trying to remember, and finally says the name his mother gave him was Crichton, but that names given by mothers don't mean anything.

==== Capt. Hook: The Adventures of a Notorious Youth ====
According to the 2007 novel Capt. Hook: The Adventures of a Notorious Youth, Captain Hook was the illegitimate son of a nobleman, "Lord B", and an unnamed woman Hook has never met (implied to be the Queen). Disowned by Lord B., James Matthew is reared by a Shakespearean actress he calls Aunt Emily, and unwillingly attends Eton College as an Oppidan scholar, where he is an avid reader of Shakespeare and Shelley, and his motto is "Knowledge is Power". He describes many things as first-rate – "Topping Swank", and punctuates his sentences with "The End". He is very interested in the French Revolution.

In the novel, James has only a few friends including Roger Peter Davies, whom he nicknames "Jolly Roger" (the name of his ship in later life), and the spider "Electra". A seventeen-year-old Colleger, Arthur Darling (named after Arthur Llewelyn Davies) is his rival in studies, fencing, sports, and the attentions of the visiting Ottoman Sultana Ananova Ariadne. When James successfully woos Ananova, their affection sets off political outrage that affects the noble position of Lord B., who arranges for James to leave Eton on his trading ship, the Sea Witch. Upon leaving, James defeats Arthur in a final duel and burns his own school records to leave no traces of his behaviour. On the Sea Witch, he befriends boatswain Bartholomew Quigley Smeethington, generally called Smee, frees the slaves aboard ship, overthrows the ship's captain (killed by Electra), and murders the quartermaster with a metal hook.

Throughout Capt. Hook, author J.V. Hart relates events in James Matthew Barrie's life and the lives of the Llewellyn Davies children. The narrative expands upon details of Barrie's original play and novel but ascribes James's unusual colouring and yellow blood to a blood disorder, makes James's long dark hair natural, rather than the usual wig, and has James titled "Hook" after murdering the quartermaster of the Sea Witch, rather than in reference to his prosthetic hand.

==== Peter and the Starcatchers ====
In the novel Peter and the Starcatchers by Dave Barry and Ridley Pearson, Captain Hook is distinguished by halitosis, beady black eyes, a pock-marked face, and perpetual filth of his person and surroundings contrasting strongly with J. M. Barrie's Etonian gentleman. The novel, which takes place before the Captain meets Peter Pan, calls Hook "Black Stache" for his prominent moustache, and his ship is called the Sea Devil; he captures the Jolly Roger, originally a British ship called the Wasp, later. Black Stache is renamed "Captain Hook" in the second instalment, Peter and the Shadow Thieves. In Barry and Pearson's book, his left hand is accidentally cut off by Peter.

In Rick Ellis' theatrical adaptation of the Barry-Pearson novel, Black Stache (portrayed in the original production by Christian Borle, who won a Tony Award for the role) is a witty, poetical, but psychotic pirate prone to malapropisms and the occasional pratfall. Similar to the Disney film character, Black Stache resembles both a dangerous villain and a comic buffoon. The last of a line of villains, he seeks to become a great villain by fighting a great hero, and finds one in Peter. His hand is cut off not by Peter, but accidentally severed when he slams the lid of a trunk in a fit of rage.

==== Pirates of the Caribbean ====
One of conceptual consultant James Ward Byrkit's concept art for the 2007 film Pirates of the Caribbean: At World's End showed a pirate similar to Captain Hook as one of the Pirate Lords of the Brethren Court.

In A. C. Crispin's 2011 novel Pirates of the Caribbean: The Price of Freedom, during a conversation between Captain Teague and Pirate Lord Don Rafael: "You'll never guess who I encountered at Oporto a few months ago. [...] James. [...] He's lost a hand. [...] he said it wasn't so bad, the hook was as good as a dagger in a fight. [...] He didn't look a day older, not a day. [...] James was a lot more...subdued. [...] The taberna keeper's little lad came round to collect our plates, and when he turned and saw he, for just a second he looked—scared. No, worse than that. Terrified. [...] Can you imagine that? Afraid! Of a young boy!" It was confirmed by the author Crispin that "James" is indeed Captain Hook from J.M. Barrie's Peter Pan. Crispin figured that since the Pirates franchise had a couple Disney "in" jokes (such as Gillette's comment about "a little mermaid" in Pirates of the Caribbean: The Curse of the Black Pearl), that she'd include the mention of "James" as a joke.

=== In theatre ===
==== Peter Pan (1950 musical) ====
In Leonard Bernstein's musical version, Boris Karloff starred as Mr. Darling/Captain Hook and Jean Arthur played Peter.

==== Peter Pan (1954 musical) ====
Most notably, Cyril Ritchard played Captain Hook in the 1954 musical adaptation which starred Mary Martin as Peter Pan. George Rose played the role in the 1977 revival which featured Sandy Duncan as Pan.

==== Finding Neverland (2012 musical) ====
The role of Captain Hook in the musical adaptation of Finding Neverland is played by the same actor playing Charles Frohman. The role was originated in Leicester by Oliver Boot. In the American Repertory Theater try out the role was played by Michael McGrath. Kelsey Grammer originated the role in the Broadway cast and replacements for the role in the production include Anthony Warlow, Terrence Mann, and Marc Kudisch. Tom Hewitt played the role in the first US national tour.

=== Other ===
==== 2012 Summer Olympics opening ceremony ====
Alongside other inflatable villains such as Lord Voldemort, the Queen of Hearts, Cruella de Vil, and The Child Catcher, Captain Hook made an appearance during the opening ceremony of the XXX Olympiad in London, representing one of the villains of British children's literature.

== See also ==
- List of amputees in film
