= Mr. Smee =

Fictional character from Peter Pan

- Peter Pan character
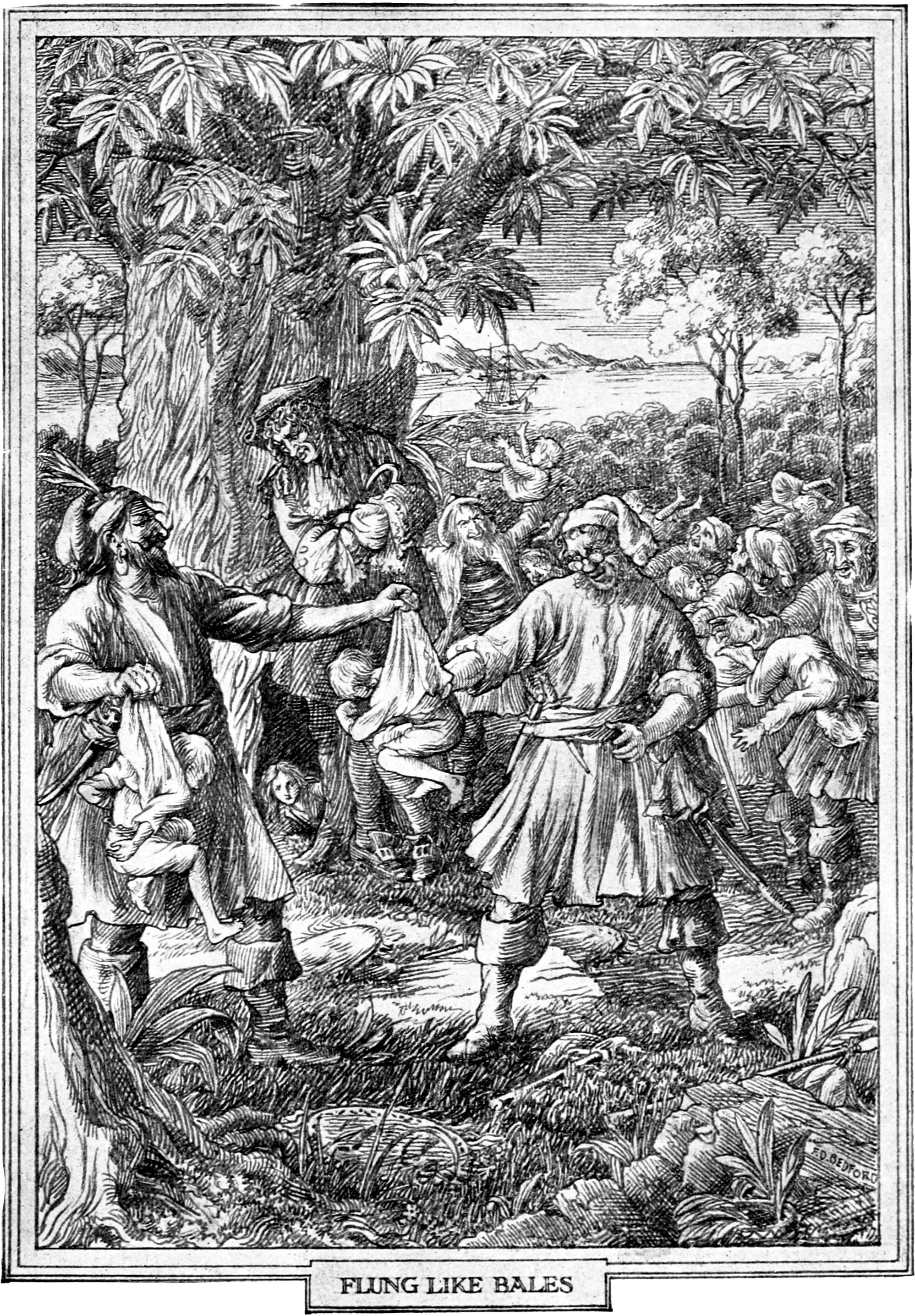
- Captain Hook (center) with Cecco (left), Mr. Smee (right) and his other men capturing the Lost Boys and Wendy watching them.
- First appearance: Peter Pan (1904)
- Created by: J. M. Barrie

In-universe information
- Species: Human
- Gender: Male
- Occupation: Boatswain
- Nationality: Irish

Mr. Smee is a fictional character who serves as Captain Hook's boatswain in J. M. Barrie's 1904 play Peter Pan, or the Boy Who Wouldn't Grow Up and the 1911 novel Peter and Wendy.

== History ==
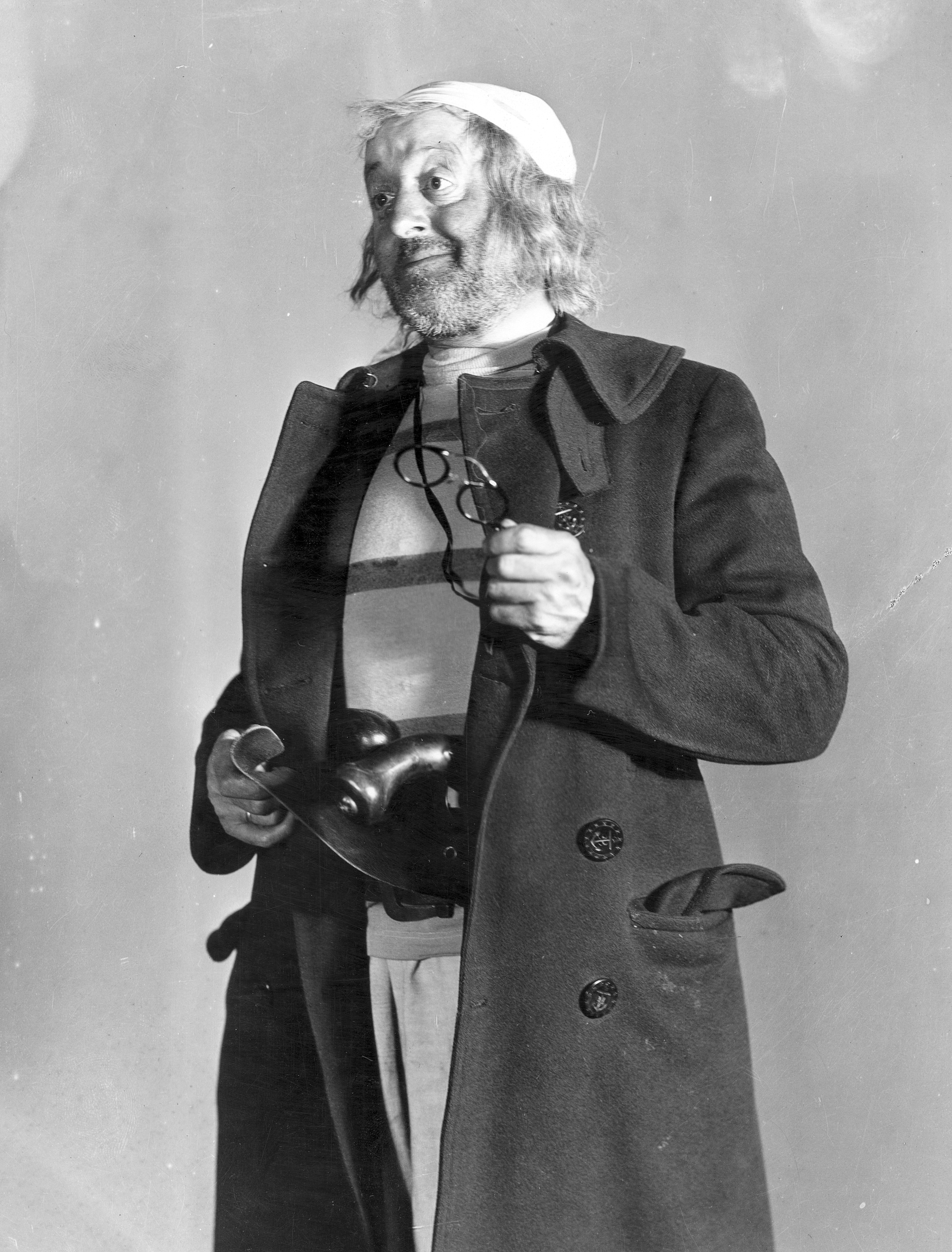
Edward Kipling as Smee in the 1924 film Peter Pan.

Mr. Smee seems an oddly genial man for a pirate; Barrie describes him as "Irish", the only Nonconformist among Captain Hook's crew, and "a man who stabbed without offence" – and is portrayed in the multiple pantomimes or movies of Peter Pan as a rather stupid but entertaining man. He is more interested in loot, rather than Hook's more evil pleasures. Smee typically represents a humorous side to pirating, often portrayed as a portly man with a bulbous nose and red cheeks, although Barrie hinted at a darker side.

When captured by Captain Hook, every child in the brig loves Smee – he cannot lay a fist on them and does their darning – despite his belief that they fear him. Hook considers that Smee has good form without knowing it, which is of course the best form of all. He almost tears into Smee for this but knows that clawing a man for having good form is very bad form. Smee offers to save Wendy Darling from the plank, if only she promises to be his mother – an offer she refuses, in Barrie's words, "Not even for Smee".

Smee's position on the Jolly Roger crew is presented inconsistently (in a sense, it could be said that "no two 'Smees' are alike"). In Peter and Wendy, he is identified as the ship's boatswain. He is one of two pirates (the other being Starkey) who survive the final battle between the children and the pirates, and "henceforth wandered about the world in his spectacles, making a precarious living by saying he was the only man that Jas. Hook had feared".

In Peter Pan in Scarlet (2006) by British author Geraldine McCaughrean, Smee has moved into the underground home of the Lost Boys. He leaves Neverland by the end of the book and opens up a shop in London that sells souvenirs collected from Neverland.

== Adaptations ==
=== Disney version ===
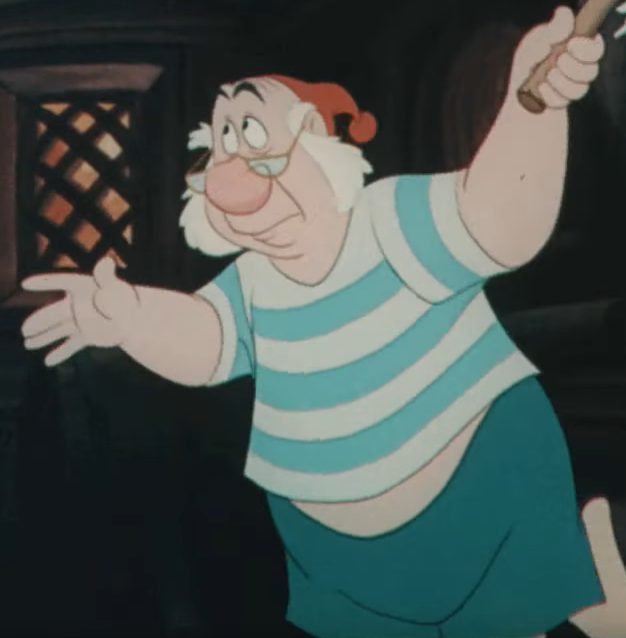
Disney's version of Mr. Smee in the 1953 animated film

Mr. Smee appears in Walt Disney's 1953 animated film version of Peter Pan voiced by Bill Thompson and by Jeff Bennett in subsequent animated appearances and video games. In this version, he serves as Captain Hook's first mate. He is also Hook's assistant, although he is sometimes referred to as the cook. In the first film, he is never referred to as the first mate but consistently acts as one to Captain Hook (though with varying degrees of personal loyalty).

Mr. Smee appears in the Disney Parks and Resorts as a meetable character alongside Captain Hook alternating between Fantasyland and Adventureland.

Mr. Smee has several cameo appearances in the television series House of Mouse, often being seen next to Captain Hook.

Mr. Smee appeared in the Kingdom Hearts video game series. He appears in Kingdom Hearts (2002), Kingdom Hearts 358/2 Days (2009), and Kingdom Hearts Birth by Sleep (2010) as an inhabitant of Neverland.

He appears as one of the main characters in the Disney Junior TV show Jake and the Never Land Pirates (2011–2016). He also appears in a cameo in the Disney Fairies film The Pirate Fairy (2014).

Mr. Smee is played by actor Faustino Di Bauda in Disney Channel's live-action film Descendants 3 (2019). In the film he has twin sons, Squeaky and Squirmy. In the novel The Isle of the Lost he also has a son called Sammy.

In the 2023 Disney live-action adaptation, Peter Pan & Wendy, Smee is played by Jim Gaffigan.

In 2026 the twin sons of Mr. Smee Squeaky and Squirmy Smee, the twin sons of Mr. Smee from Peter Pan. They appear as energetic young villain kids (VKs) originating from the Isle of the Lost. in Disney Channel's live-action film Descendants:Wicked Wonderland (2026).

Smee makes a cameo appearance in the Lego animated special Lego Disney Princess: The Castle Quest (2023), as a crewmate of Iago's pirate crew.

=== Peter Pan and the Pirates ===
In the Fox Kids series Peter Pan and the Pirates, Mr. Smee (voiced by Ed Gilbert with an Irish accent) is Hook's right-hand man. His weapon is named Johnny Corkscrew. He is small, but not thick, has grey hair and pale blue eyes. His biggest difference from the other pirates is that he is clumsy and not able to capture one of the Lost Boys (as seen in "Slightly Duped" and "Play Ball").

=== Hook ===
In Steven Spielberg's 1991 film Hook, Smee (played by Bob Hoskins) and Hook's relationship takes on an almost intimate tone, at times even resembling an old married couple or a master/servant arrangement. Smee is allowed access to Hook's private quarters, is seen preparing meals for the captain and even helps him disrobe before bed. When Hook threatens suicide, he makes it obvious that he expects Smee to stop him, to which Smee replies "not again". Hook also confides all of his darkest and most personal thoughts and concerns to Smee, seemingly exclusively. When Hook claims (untruthfully) that he wants to die, Smee embraces the captain and kisses him on the cheek to dissuade him. He also talks Hook into trying to persuade Peter's children, Jack and Maggie, to remain in Neverland permanently by using their father's repeated broken promises and prolonged absences as examples. Though Hook is successful with Jack, Maggie refuses to be swayed and retains her faith in Peter. Smee eventually abandons Hook when he realizes how much Peter loves his children. Near the end of the film, a man bearing a striking resemblance to Smee is seen sweeping garbage in Kensington Gardens, to Peter's surprise, but whether or not he is the real Smee is left unclear.

=== Peter Pan (2003) ===
Richard Briers portrays Smee in the 2003 live-action adaptation of Peter Pan.

=== Neverland ===
Bob Hoskins reprises the role of Mr. Smee in the 2011 miniseries Neverland.

=== Once Upon a Time ===
William Smee
- Once Upon a Time character
- First appearance: "The Crocodile" (2.05)
- Last appearance: "Leaving Storybrooke" (7.22)
- Portrayed by: Chris Gauthier

In-universe information
- Gender: Male
- Occupation: Black market trader; Crewman of the Jolly Roger

Mr. Smee appears as William Smee in the television series Once Upon a Time, played by Chris Gauthier.

William Smee is a man capable of procuring objects that are hard to find. In the Enchanted Forest, he makes a deal with Rumplestiltskin in order to get his life extended: a magic bean for his age reversal. Captain Hook, then the pirate Killian Jones, manages to intervene and kidnaps Mr. Smee to obtain the magic bean. He later becomes a crewman on Hook's ship (like the original Peter Pan story) as the ship sails off to Neverland where he and his crew will never age.

In Neverland, Mr. Smee serves as an adviser to Hook, assisting in his murderous aspirations to kill Rumplestiltskin and his aspirations to obtain information and raise the newly arrived Baelfire. He worries of the crew being murdered by the Lost Boys who are searching for Baelfire whom the pirates had rescued from drowning.

In Storybrooke, Mr. Smee appears as a homeless man who kidnaps Belle under the orders of Moe French (Maurice). When Mr. Gold (Rumplestiltskin) captures Mr. Smee to learn where Hook is, he states that he wasn't able to find Hook in Storybrooke. Mr. Gold later uses him as a guinea pig for a spell that would enable anyone to cross the border to Storybrooke without losing their memories again. When Hook does get to Storybrooke, Smee immediately begins following orders; he gives Hook Gold's most prized possession: Baelfire's shawl. In retaliation, Gold turns Mr. Smee into a rat.

Following the Dark Curse's being undone, Mr. Smee was restored to human form as he was seen in the company of Hook and his pirates when they were robbing a stagecoach. However, he still has some side effects of being in rat form. Hook volunteers Smee to sail Henry to New York when Henry wants to run away from Storybrooke to go home.

=== Pan ===
Smee appears in the film Pan, portrayed by Adeel Akhtar. His real name is Sam Smiegel, shortened to Smee.

=== Come Away ===
Smee is played by Ned Dennehy in the 2020 movie Come Away.

=== Skeleton Crew ===
In the 2024 Star Wars television show, Skeleton Crew, the droid "boatswain" is named SM-33, a nod to Smee. Although he has moments of threatening behavior, he is primarily a good-natured and competent assistant to the self-appointed "captain."

== Bibliography ==
- Barrie, J.M. (1904). Peter Pan
- Barrie, J.M. (1911). Peter and Wendy
- Hart, J.V. (2007). Capt. Hook: The Adventures of a Notorious Youth
- Pearson, Ridley and Dave Barry. (2004). Peter and the Starcatchers
- Pearson, Ridley and Dave Barry. (2006). Peter and the Shadow Thieves
