= Stop That Train =

Stop That Train may refer to:

- "Stop That Train" (song), first released by the Spanishtonians in 1965
- Stop! That! Train!, a 2026 action comedy film directed by Adam Shankman
- "Stop That Train", a song by the Wailers from the 1971 album The Best of the Wailers

== See also ==
- Stop the Train, a 2001 novel by Geraldine McCaughrean
