= Peter Pan in Scarlet =

2006 novel by Geraldine McCaughrea

- First UK edition
- Author: Geraldine McCaughrean
- Illustrator: Scott M. Fischer (US)
- Cover artist: David Wyatt (UK); Tony DiTerlizzi (US)
- Language: English
- Publisher: Oxford University Press (UK); Margaret K. McElderry (US)
- Publication date: October 5, 2006
- Preceded by: Peter and Wendy

Peter Pan in Scarlet is a 2006 novel by British author Geraldine McCaughrean. It is the official sequel to J. M. Barrie's Peter and Wendy (1911), as it was authorised by Great Ormond Street Hospital, which was granted all rights to the characters and original writings by Barrie in 1929. McCaughrean was selected in 2004 following a competition in which novelists were invited to submit a sample chapter and plot outline for a sequel. Set in 1926, the book continues the story of the Lost Boys, the Darling family, and Peter Pan, during the reign of George V and following World War I.

The book was released internationally on 5 October 2006. The first United Kingdom printing consisted of a standard run of approximately 30,000 copies, and a limited edition of 1,500 copies with a specially printed bookplate, individually numbered and signed by the author. In Britain it was released with a cover illustration and interior silhouettes by David Wyatt, and in the United States with a cover illustration by Tony DiTerlizzi. The US edition features interior silhouette illustrations by Scott M. Fischer. The book was also released in audio format in the UK and US.

Five copies of a special edition, leather bound in a slipcase, were also printed; the author, Great Ormond Street Hospital, Oxford University Press, and Queen Elizabeth II (Patron of Great Ormond Street Hospital) each received one of these special edition books. The fifth was auctioned at the book launch.

A new edition, fully illustrated in colour by David Wyatt, abridged by Geraldine McCaughrean for younger readers, was published in the UK in October 2008 by Oxford University Press.

== Plot summary ==
The novel returns to Wendy Darling, her brother John, and Nibs, Slightly, Tootles, the Twins and Curly, who were once Peter Pan's Lost Boys. The six boys were adopted by Mr and Mrs Darling at the end of Peter and Wendy. Michael Darling had died during the Great War.

John Darling has been having visions about Neverland. The former Lost Boys and Wendy have been having similar dreams, and Wendy realises that bombs from the Great War have punched holes through their world into Neverland, and dreams and ideas are filtering back. Wendy tells the former Lost Boys, now known as Old Boys, that they must find a way to return to Neverland to help Peter Pan restore both worlds to normality. In order to fly, they need fairy dust, so Wendy finds a baby and waits for its first laugh. They come across the fairy Fireflyer, a lying fairy who tells them that in order to get back to Neverland, they must go back to being children. To do this, they must wear their children's clothing. Tootles turns into a girl because he only has daughters. Nibs decides not to join them because he would miss his children too much.

Peter has been dreaming of the Darlings as well, but when they and their Newfoundland puppy (a descendant of Nana from the first book) return to Neverland, he seems indifferent. He does not notice that Nibs is absent, nor that Michael Darling is dead (apparently having died in World War I). He is concerned only with having the best adventure in the world. When the Neverwood catches fire, Peter and company escape the island by way of the Jolly Roger, renamed the Jolly Peter. While on board, Captain Pan discovers the late Captain Hook's second-best coat and finds a treasure map of Neverland in the pocket. Sensing an adventure, he immediately wants to head to the mountain of Neverpeak to claim James Hook's treasure. Peter allows the mysterious circus master Ravello, whose circus has been destroyed in the fire, to join his crew as his valet. Ravello urges Peter to wear the red coat.

During the journey, Peter grows irritable. He develops a harsh cough, and it seems that whenever he wears the coat he is grouchiest. He banishes Fireflyer for eating up the food supply. When he finds that Slightly is growing older, he banishes him as well to Nowhereland, home of all the Long Lost Boys whom Peter has banished in times past.

The hike up Neverpeak is arduous. When the band finally reaches the summit, Peter is impatient to get at the treasure, because he has a feeling there is something inside he wants so much. Inside the treasure chest, each child finds what they have been wishing for on the way up, including Tinker Bell, wished up by Fireflyer, but the gang is puzzled to discover Peter wished for Eton treasures. He looks like a young version of Captain Hook, complete with long black hair and Eton tie. Peter is horrified that he is no longer himself, at the same time that Ravello reveals his true identity as James Hook, who has survived being swallowed up by the crocodile.

Hook seeks revenge and reveals that he served as Peter's valet in order to make the boy be transformed like him when Peter wears Hook's old pirate coat. Hook says that since he is a grown up, he is no longer able to wish, so he needed Peter to wish for the treasures that Hook has wanted all his life. He cut off Peter's shadow so the boy could not fly, combed the imagination out of his hair, and choked him with the white Eton tie. Peter refuses to believe he has become Hook and is horrified. The band is shocked by the revelation.

Hook tries to trick Peter by asking him what he wants to be when he grows up, when Slightly suddenly appears. Slightly, who has been dogging the band's trail all along, warns Peter not to answer, because if he does, he will have betrayed childhood and "looked ahead" to adulthood. Peter feebly banishes Hook to Nowhereland, but to no avail. The league is stuck on the mountain in a blizzard, with no fire and no way to get down. Suddenly Fireflyer appears and, to impress Tinker Bell, plunges into the brush and starts a fire.

Peter has cast off the hated coat, but become cold and ill in his flimsy tunic. He falls to the ground in a coughing fit, and is soon close to death. Tootles insists they need a doctor, so Curly Looks Ahead, growing up and becoming a doctor. He makes an incision over Peter's chest, and draws out a long dusty strand—a strand of common London fog brought in on the children's clothes. With the offending item removed, Peter's health is restored.

Warmed by the fire and heartened by Peter's renewed health, the league finds the courage to descend the mountain. Peter is confronted by the banished Long Lost Boys at the foot of the mountain, where he, John, and Wendy are thrown in quicksand. They manage to pull themselves out, but Ravello has returned with his circus animals. The animals are about to devour Peter and the Explorers, when a band of warring fairies descend and smother the animals. Hook is enraged, and vows to fight the weaponless Peter. The boy is saved by the puppy, which attacks Hook. The latter is about to die, when Wendy sees that he can be healed by sleep. She gives him a goodnight kiss, and tucks him under his tattered red coat.

The children escape without harm, and find a way home with help from Mr. Smee. Peter unwillingly remains on the island, unable to fly until his shadow grows back. Wendy says, "I think your mother only shut the window to keep out the FOG!"

Unbeknown to Peter, sleep restores Ravello as James Hook. The story ends with Hook recalling the past and anticipating revenge.

== Characters ==
- Peter Pan - Peter, the One-and-Only Child, has taken up a lonely residence in the abandoned Wendy House. When the Darlings return, he immediately proposes a quest. Finding the Jolly Roger and renaming it the Jolly Peter, he discovers Hook's map of Neverland, showing treasure on top of mount Neverpeak. Peter faces many obstacles along the way, but uses his cleverness to outwit the enemy, until he is nearly turned into Captain Hook because he has donned the pirate's coat. Peter is nearly killed, but is saved by Dr. Curly. At the end of the novel, The Marvelous Boy is shadowless, and confined to the island because he has lost the ability to fly until his shadow grows back.
- Wendy Darling - At the start of the novel, the adult Wendy Darling announces they must return to Neverland. Wearing her daughter Jane's clothing, she returns to Neverland and her role as the mother of the Lost Boys. Wendy is a stickler for good manners, and she is also very compassionate, feeling sorry and taking care of even the worst villains. Wendy is banished by Peter for saving the enemy, but she completely disregards her sentence.
- Ravello - Ravello is a travelling man, a circus master who set up tent on the island of Neverland. When the island is set on fire, he escapes with his animals to serve as valet to Peter. Ravello is very mysterious - he is clad in a ragged woolen coat, never sleeps, and eats only eggs. It is later revealed that he is none other than Captain Hook, who survived inside the crocodile's stomach, but was mutated by stomach acid into a soft nothing of a man. Ravello is nearly killed by the Darlings' dog, in the act of saving Peter from him. He survives as Hook, thanks to Wendy's good-night kiss.
- John Darling - John announces at the start, "I won't go to bed". He is terrified by dreams of Neverland, but later agrees to return there. He tries to be chivalrous throughout the novel. John's manner bears a resemblance to his father George Darling, as when John states "Can't a man be believed in his own house?"
- Tootles Darling - As an adult, Tootles is a portly Judge who loves his moustache and believes everything can be solved judicially. Tootles has only daughters, so in order to return to Neverland, he must dress like a girl. This is fine with the young female Tootles, who dreams of becoming a princess and a nurse; she would also love to marry Peter and become Tootles Pan.
- Curly Darling - Curly is a thin, sensible doctor when he decides to return to Neverland. When Peter's life is threatened, Curly agrees to become an adult, risking banishment to save the boy. Curly escapes banishment, leaving Neverland on a raft. Dr. Curly takes the family puppy, Nana's descendant, to Neverland. When he returns home, his children chastise him for "growing the puppy".
- Slightly Darling - Slightly Darling has become a baronet, but his wife has died and he has no children. He must "go down to the bottom of the bed" as a way to become a child. Slightly has learned clarinet in his adulthood, and his playing saves the League in a crisis. Slightly begins to grow up while on the island, and is banished by Peter, finding his only companion to be the loyal fairy Fireflyer. Slightly helps to save Peter from growing up. When Slightly returns to London, he remains eighteen, and makes a living playing clarinet in a dance band. In this sequel, Slightly is portrayed as shy and gentle.
- First and Second Twin Darling - The grown-up Twins live next door to each other in London, each the father of twin boys. When they return to Neverland, they are among the few who avoid banishment by Peter. It is revealed that their actual names are Marmaduke and Binky.
- Nibs Darling- Nibs has grown up to work in an office. He completely intended to return to Neverland, but resigned from the group because he could not bear to leave his beloved children.
- Fireflyer - Fireflyer, a blue fairy, was born as the result of a baby's laugh in Kensington Garden. He is thoroughly devoted to Slightly, who admired the size of his lies. Fireflyer wishes for Tinker Bell to be alive, and ends up marrying her.
- Tinker Bell - Tinker Bell, the fairy whom Wendy and John meet in their first adventure to Neverland, returns as the result of Fireflyer's wishing to meet her. She ends up marrying him at the end of the novel. Both decided to sell dreams to Roamers (ex-lost boys-who were cast out by Peter).
- Smee - Smee has returned taking the posts of both first mate and bo'sun. He lives in the underground den, and knows a great deal about Grief Reef and the Maze of Regrets. He leaves the island for London, where he sets up a shop selling souvenirs from Neverland.
- Starkey - First mate Starkey has taken control of a steamship, and has reared a group of young Indians for his crew. Starkey launches an unsuccessful attack on the Jolly Peter, and his treasure of 7,284 onions was eaten by Fireflyer.

== Adaptations ==
=== Radio ===
A radio adaptation of the book was broadcast on BBC Radio 4 shortly after its release, on 14 October 2006. It starred Robert Glenister as the Narrator, Daniel Mays as Peter Pan, Kate Maberly as Wendy, and Roger Allam as Ravello.

Cast:

- Narrator - Robert Glenister
- Peter Pan - Daniel Mays
- Wendy - Kate Maberly
- Ravello - Roger Allam
- John - Tom George
- Tootles (female) - Robin Weaver
- Tootles (male) - Joseph Kloska
- Fireflyer - Peter Gunn
- Curly - Simon Scardifield
- Slightly - Steven Webb
- Twin 1 - Damian Lynch
- Twin 2 - Paul Richard Biggin
- Starkey/Smee/Roarer - Sam Dale
- Woman 1/Roarer - Rachel Atkins
- Tinker Bell - Emerald O'Hanrahan

Music composed by David Pickvance; producer/director Celia de Wolff

=== Stage ===
A stage version of Peter Pan in Scarlet, adapted and directed by Theresa Heskins, opened at the New Vic Theatre in Newcastle-under-Lyme on 23 July 2016; it moved to the Oxford Playhouse in August 2016.

=== Film ===
In 2006, a movie adaptation was announced, being produced by a consortium of Headline Pictures, the UK Film Council, and BBC Films. Since then, no additional news has surfaced and, as of 2024, the project's status is unknown.
