= Peter Pan syndrome =

Term for a socially immature adult

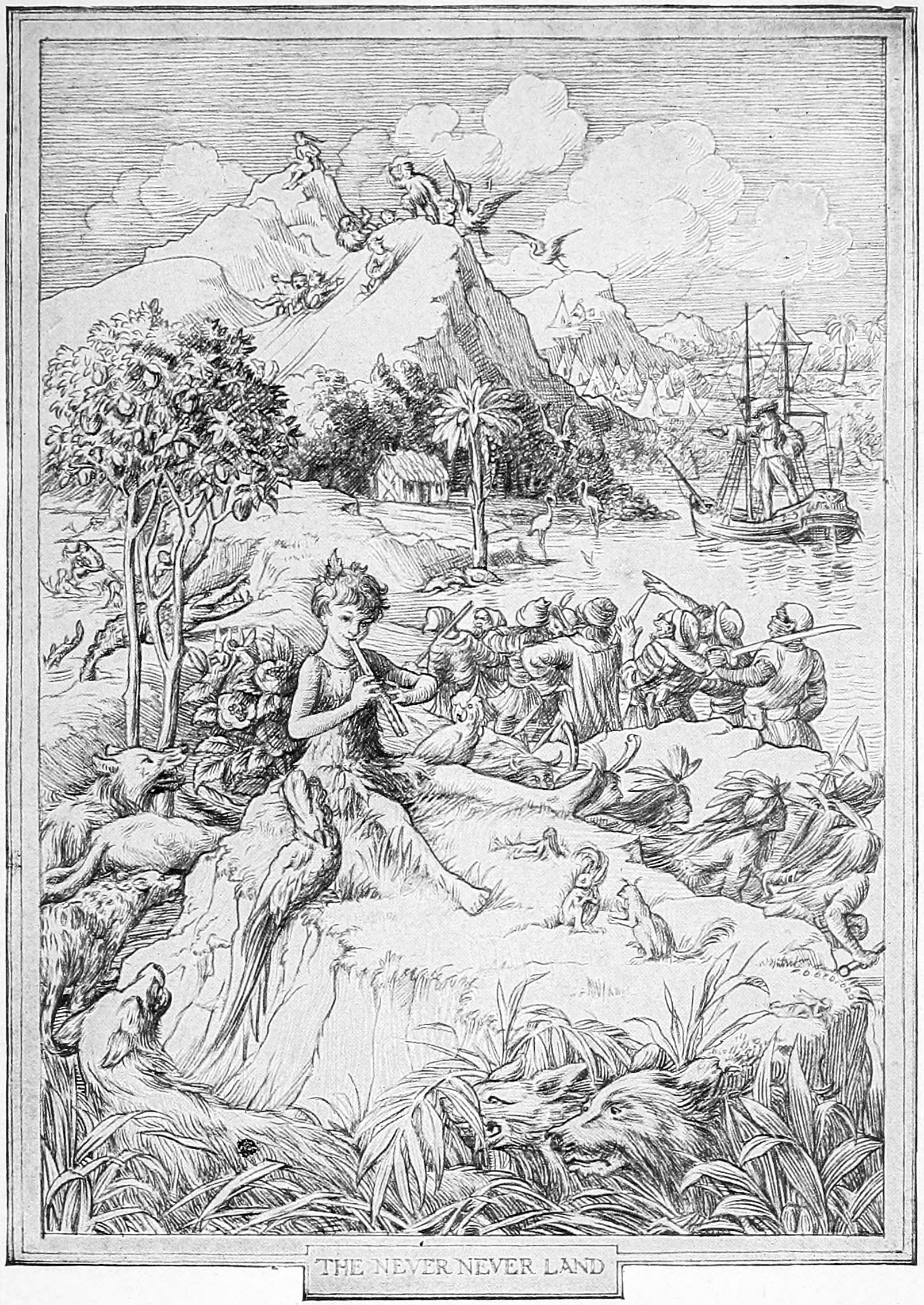
- Illustration of Peter Pan playing the pipes, by F. D. Bedford from Peter and Wendy
- Coined by: Dan Kiley

Peter Pan syndrome is a pop psychology term used to describe an adult who is socially immature. It refers to "never-growing" people who have reached an adult age, but cannot face their adult sensations and responsibilities. The term is a metaphor based on the concept of not growing up and being unable to leave childhood. People with Peter Pan Syndrome show behaviours associated with immaturity and a reluctance to be an adult. They have difficulties in social and professional relationships because of their irresponsible behaviours. While it has often only been associated with men in the past, it can affect adults of any sex or gender.

The term has been used informally by both non-experts and some psychology professionals since the 1983 publication of The Peter Pan Syndrome: Men Who Have Never Grown Up, by Dr. Dan Kiley. Peter Pan Syndrome is not recognised by the World Health Organization and is not listed in the Diagnostic and Statistical Manual of Mental Disorders (DSM-5).

== History ==
The concept gained popularity through psychoanalyst Dr. Dan Kiley in his book The Peter Pan Syndrome: Men Who Have Never Grown Up first published in 1983. His book became an international best seller and led to a wave of copycat pop-psychology books. Dr. Kiley got the idea for "The Peter Pan Syndrome" after noticing that, like the character in the J. M. Barrie play, many of the troubled teenage boys he treated had problems growing up and accepting responsibilities. This trouble continued into adulthood.

In his 1997 book, Men Who Never Grow Up, Kiley lists seven key markers of Peter Pan Syndrome:

1. Emotional paralysis: People may have dulled emotions or express their feelings in inappropriate ways.
2. Slowness: They may be apathetic, avoid tasks, and frequently late.
3. Social challenges: They may feel anxious and have difficulty forming and maintaining relationships. Their fear of commitment and reluctance to take on responsibilities can hinder their ability to connect with others.
4. Avoidance of responsibility: Individuals with Peter Pan syndrome may resist or avoid taking on adult roles and responsibilities, such as pursuing a career, managing finances, or maintaining a stable long-term relationship. They may prefer to live in the moment and avoid making commitments that require long-term planning or sacrifice. They may avoid taking accountability for their mistakes and may blame others.
5. Relationships with women: They can have difficulty with maternal relationships and treat future romantic partners as "mother figures".
6. Relationships with men: They may feel distant from their fathers and have trouble with male authority figures.
7. Romantic relationships: They may be afraid of rejection from romantic partners and desire a partner who is dependent on them.

Critics have said that these criteria are outdated, reflect patriarchal ideas of gender and sexuality, and are therefore not often used in a modern view of Peter Pan Syndrome. While earlier texts limit the diagnosis of the syndrome to only men, these characteristics can affect adults of any sex or gender.

== Characteristics ==
Peter Pan syndrome is a psychological term for people who find it hard to be an adult. They have challenges maintaining relationships and managing responsibilities and may exhibit traits such as avoiding responsibilities, resisting commitment, seeking constant fun and excitement, and showing a lack of ambition or direction in life. They may prefer to engage in activities associated with childhood rather than taking on the responsibilities and challenges of adulthood.

The causes for this behaviour likely vary for each person and underlying mechanisms remain unexplained; however, the issue seems to be rooted in childhood experiences, such as neglect or overprotective parenting.

Since Peter Pan Syndrome is not a clinical diagnosis, professionals have not made an official list of symptoms. However, in some publications the following characteristics are mentioned commonly.

=== Signs in relationships ===
People with Peter Pan syndrome might struggle with maintaining healthy relationships. This includes struggling to express their emotions, listen to others, and play an equal role in their relationships. People may place a burden on others, avoiding responsibilities and decision-making.

While Peter Pan Syndrome is characterised with issues maintaining long-term relationships, individuals also experience a strong fear of loneliness and rely heavily on their parents and family.

=== Work-related signs ===
People with Peter Pan Syndrome tend to struggle with job and career goals. This is because of issues with responsibility and commitment. They may struggle to motivate themselves to work or give up easily when they feel bored, challenged, or stressed.

=== Signs in attitude, mood, and behaviour ===
People with Peter Pan syndrome may show a pattern of unreliability and self-centered tendencies characterised by preoccupation with self-image and prioritisation of personal needs and desires.

They are easily irritated, having difficulties controlling impulsive behaviour, especially when facing stressful situations.

== Treatment and management ==
Since Peter Pan syndrome is not a clinical diagnosis, there are no set guidelines regarding how to manage the behavior and feelings of the individual.

== See also ==
- Boomerang Generation
- Puer aeternus
- Childhood (Michael Jackson song)
