= The White Darkness (novel) =

2005 novel by Geraldine McCaughrean

- First edition
- Author: Geraldine McCaughrean
- Language: English
- Genre: Young adult novel
- Publisher: Oxford University Press
- Publication date: Sep 2005
- Publication place: United Kingdom
- Media type: Print (Hardback & Paperback)
- Pages: 360
- ISBN: 0-19-271983-1
- OCLC: 232977375

The White Darkness is a novel by Geraldine McCaughrean, published in 2005 by Oxford University Press. It won the 2008 Michael L. Printz Award from the American Library Association.

== Plot summary ==
Shy teenager Symone 'Sym' Wates is taken to Antarctica by her domineering 'uncle', Victor Briggs, who after the death of her real parent has elected himself her surrogate father. An obsessive believer in the hollow earth theories of John Cleves Symmes, Jr., Briggs is convinced that in Antarctica he will find the entrance to the Inner World and its inhabitants. He is ready to sacrifice Sym and others to prove his theory and increasingly puts her in danger until she finally sees the truth about him. She is then able to escape his plans for her. Briggs dies still pursuing his obsession while Sym returns to her own life with new freedom.

== Major characters ==
Sym is a teenager whose whole life has been dominated by her dead father's business partner, her so-called 'uncle' Victor. Clever, shy and almost totally deaf, Sym is withdrawn and insecure. She feels particularly anxious about being different from others in her peer group. At first, she defers to her 'uncle' as the authority in her life until gradually she learns he is not a trustworthy model, begins to make her own judgments and saves herself by her own efforts.

Victor Briggs is a middle-aged crank, consumed by a belief in his own genius and the stupidity of others. He believes in the theory of "Symmes Hole" and is convinced he can prove it by traveling to the South Pole and discovering the entrance to the Inner World. Though at first appearing eccentric and ridiculous he becomes gradually more sinister since he will clearly let nothing stand in the way of his project.

Titus is Sym's imaginary friend and alter ego, created from her knowledge of the Antarctic explorer 'Titus' Oates. He is affectionate, unflappable, honest, endlessly supportive and endearingly male. Through her inner 'conversations' with him, Sym mulls over what she is told, compares it with reality and gradually frees herself from the deceptions imposed on her by others – principally by her 'Uncle' Victor, and also by the conman Manfred Bruch and his apparently love-smitten 'son', Sigurd.

Manfred and Sigurd Bruch: a handsome father-and-son team who accompany Sym and Victor on their expedition to Antarctica. Manfred Bruch claims to be a film-maker but is really a conman intent on fleecing Victor Briggs through a feigned belief in his theory; Sigurd is a young actor paid to pretend to be his son.

== Motifs ==
Deception and abuse are the main motifs. Victor has been (non-sexually) abusing Sym almost from her birth, imposing his own beliefs as the only possible reality, grooming her to do his bidding, maintaining control by ruthlessly dividing her from parents and peers, planning her future to suit his own ends. Bruch and his 'son' Sigurd attempt to con Briggs but end up conned themselves when their mark turns out to be a psychotic fantasist. Lastly, Sym has to face up to her beloved Titus being only a creature of her own imagination, a response to her desperate need (though this disillusionment at least is slightly softened at the end when it is implied he may just possibly be something more).

== Figurative language ==
The Antarctic terrain is depicted as treacherous, indifferent to humans, full of hidden pitfalls and haunted by mirages. Sym's final agonizing trek to safety mirrors her difficulty and pain at discovering the truth behind the lies she has been told.

== Awards ==
- Michael L. Printz award winner, 2008:

"Symone's unforgettable voice propels this journey of discovery in a book that is intricately plotted, richly imaged and brings new meaning to the term unreliable narrator," said Printz Award Committee Chair Lynn Rutan. "Readers will need to hang onto their snow goggles in this compelling book in which nothing is as it seems at first glance."

- Calderdale Children's Book Award, 2006 (Shortlisted)
- Whitbread Children's Book Award, 2005
- Carnegie Medal, 2005 (Shortlisted)
