= Where the World Ends =

2017 novel by Geraldine McCaughrean

- Author: Geraldine McCaughrean
- Publisher: Usborne Publishing
- Publication date: May 1, 2017
- Publication place: United Kingdom
- Awards: Carnegie Medal (2018)
- ISBN: 978-1-474-92114-5

Where the World Ends is a 2017 young adult novel by British writer Geraldine McCaughrean and illustrated by Jane Milloy. It won the 2018 Carnegie Medal.

== Plot summary ==
Where the World Ends is a historical fiction story of survival and resilience. Set in 1727 on the remote St Kilda archipelago in northern Scotland, the book follows a group of nine boys and three men who are abandoned on a sea stack while harvesting birds for an annual tradition. When the boat does not return after two weeks, the boys must confront fear, suffering, and death, and decide what makes life worth living.

== Reception ==
Where the World Ends was positively received by critics, including starred reviews from Booklist, Kirkus Reviews, and Shelf Awareness.

Reviewing the book, Booklist's Maggie Reagan wrote, "McCaughrean ... slips into the cracks of the human soul, dissecting with compassion the many paths that a person might take when confronted with such a challenge. The design of the book is as austere as its subject ... and, in an afterword, McCaughrean describes the tragic true story that inspired her own. Though this story is desperately sad at times, it glistens, too, propelled by the notion that where there is life, there is always, always hope."

Kirkus Reviews called the novel "a masterpiece," highlighting how "McCaughrean takes the bones of a real event, wraps it in immersive, imaginative detail and thoroughly real emotion, and creates an unforgettable tale of human survival.

Writing for Shelf Awareness, Emilie Coulter highlighted how Where the World Ends "stuns with its dark narrative and haunting visual imagery." She further commended McCaughrean's decision to include "illuminating back matter, like a glossary, and an illustrated list of the birds of 18th-century St. Kilda," which helps readers to "[explore] what happens when the everyday-ordinary turns disastrously extraordinary."

== Awards ==
Where the World Ends is a Junior Library Guild book. Booklist included it on their 2020 "Top 10 Historical Fiction for Youth" list.

Awards for Where the World Ends
Year	Award		Result	Ref.
2018	Books Are My Bag Readers' Awards	Young Adult	Shortlisted	
2018	Carnegie Medal	—	Won	
2018	Independent Bookshop Week Book Award	Young Adult	Won	
2020	Michael L. Printz Award	—	Honor	

Awards
Preceded by Salt to the Sea	Carnegie Medal recipient 2018	Succeeded by The Poet X
