= Not the End of the World (McCaughrean novel) =

2004 young adult novel by Geraldine McCaughrean

- First edition (publ. OUP)
- Author: Geraldine McCaughrean
- Language: English
- Published: 2004 (Oxford University Press)
- Publication place: United Kingdom
- Media type: Hardback
- Pages: 192
- Awards: Whitbread Children's Book Award
- ISBN: 978-0-192-71972-0
- OCLC: 57290716

Not the End of the World is a 2004 young adult novel by Geraldine McCaughrean. It retells the Biblical story of Noah's Ark. The main character is Noah's thirteen-year-old daughter, Timna. The story is also relayed from the points of view of the animals. The novel was first published in 2004 and was the winner of the 2004 Whitbread Children's Book Award.
