= List of amputees in film =

Characters with limb loss and limb difference are frequently found in many popular movies. In some cases they illustrate how individuals can thrive after limb loss.

Character	Movie(s)	Type	Cause
Aron Ralston	127 Hours	Right below-elbow	Self-amputation (knife)
Homer Parrish	The Best Years of Our Lives	Bilateral below-elbow	Trauma (fire)
David Della Rocco	The Boondock Saints	Left little finger	Trauma (bullet wound)
King Fergus	Brave	Left below-knee	Trauma (bitten off in battle)
Dr. Julius No	Dr. No	Bilateral below-elbow	Radiation
Ash Williams	Evil Dead franchise	Right hand	Self-amputation (chainsaw)
Lt. Dan Taylor	Forrest Gump	Bilateral above-knee	Trauma (bomb)
Fredrick Sykes	The Fugitive	Right below-elbow	Trauma
Hiccup	How to Train Your Dragon franchise	Left below-knee	Trauma (battle)
Toothless	How to Train Your Dragon franchise	Left tail fin	Trauma (crash)
Dr. Claw	Inspector Gadget	Left hand	Trauma (car collision)
Don	Joe Dirt	Left above-knee	Trauma (train)
Gazelle	Kingsman: The Secret Service	Bilateral below-knee	(unknown)
Imperator Furiosa	Mad Max: Fury Road	Left below-elbow	(unknown)
Bucky Barnes	Marvel Cinematic Universe franchise	Left arm	Trauma
Nebula	Marvel Cinematic Universe franchise	Left arm	Self-amputation
Black Knight	Monty Python and the Holy Grail	Quadrilateral	Trauma (sword)
Ronny Cammareri	Moonstruck	Left hand	Trauma (bread slicer)
Lady Kushana	Nausicaä of the Valley of the Wind	Trilateral (left arm and both legs)	Trauma (insect)
Captain Hook	Peter Pan	Left hand	Trauma (knife)
Cherry Darling	Planet Terror	Right above-knee	Mutilation (zombies)
Lady Eboshi	Princess Mononoke	Right arm	Trauma (wolf)
Harold Pointer	Intent Unknown	Bilateral below-knee	Trauma (gun shot)
Will Sawyer	Skyscraper	Left below-knee	Trauma (bomb)
Bethany Hamilton	Soul Surfer	Left above-elbow	Trauma (shark)
Luke Skywalker	Star Wars franchise	Right hand	Trauma (lightsaber)
Darth Vader	Star Wars franchise	Quadrilateral	Trauma (lightsaber)
Jeff Bauman	Stronger	Bilateral above-knee	Trauma (bomb)
Terry Fox	The Terry Fox Story	Right above-knee	Cancer
Jerome	Jerome's Secret	Bilateral leg	Unknown/speculated
