= A Pack of Lies =

1988 children's novel by Geraldine McCaughrean

- First edition
- Author: Geraldine McCaughrean
- Cover artist: Robina Green
- Language: English
- Genre: Children's novel
- Publisher: Oxford University Press
- Publication date: December 1988
- Publication place: United Kingdom
- Media type: Print (hardcover, paperback)
- Pages: 168 pp (first edition)
- ISBN: 0-19-271612-3
- OCLC: 17982275
- LC Class: PZ7.M4784133 Pac 2009 (paperback)

A Pack of Lies: twelve stories in one is a children's novel with metafictional elements, written by Geraldine McCaughrean and published by Oxford in 1988. It features a family antique shop whose new salesman tells historical tales to sell antiques. The stories vary widely in type.

McCaughrean won the annual Carnegie Medal from the Library Association, recognising the year's best children's book by a British subject. She also won the Guardian Children's Fiction Prize, a similar award that authors may not win twice. Six books have won both awards in 45 years through 2011. (Note: Alternatively, six authors have won the Carnegie Medal for their Guardian Prize-winning books. Professional librarians confer the Carnegie and select the winner from all British children's books. The Guardian newspaper's prize winner is selected by British children's writers, "peers" of the author who has not yet won it, for one children's (age 7+) or young-adult fiction book. Details regarding author and publisher nationality have varied.)

Scholastic published a US edition in 1991.

== Plot summary ==
The narrative follows the age-old pattern of separate stories embedded within a primary story, as in the Panchatantra, the Arabian Nights and the Canterbury Tales. Each of the stories is linked to a different piece of furniture in an antique shop, and the question arises as to whether the stories are pure invention ("a pack of lies") or could perhaps be true – and what their being "true" would mean about the narrator.

A young man with the unlikely name of MCC Berkshire ("from Reading") follows Ailsa home from the library and talks himself into an unpaid job in her mother's run-down antique shop – all he asks is somewhere to sleep and books to read. He has a wonderful way of assessing the customers and suiting the provenance he gives the furniture to their interests. Moreover, he seems to adapt himself – his accent, his manner, his personal history – to the story being told, which also seems to be inspired by the book he has just been reading. When chided by Mrs Povey for telling lies, he responds: "'Not lies, madam.... Fiction. That's the thing to give 'em. That's the thing everyone wants. Fiction, madam!' "

Ailsa and Mrs Povey, while grateful to MCC for his help and enjoying his company, often have doubts about him, while Uncle Clive, on a brief visit, is positively hostile. After the Poveys' financial problems are suddenly solved, literally from the pages of a book, the scene is set for MCC's departure. In the final chapter Ailsa realises the shocking truth, while the reader realises that Ailsa's reality is another of MCC's tales.

== The characters ==
- MCC Berkshire, a mysterious stranger, an inveterate reader and spinner of tales
- Ailsa Povey, a schoolgirl
- Audrey Povey, Ailsa's widowed mother, who owns Povey's Antiquary, a junk shop
- Clive Povey, Ailsa's uncle, Audrey's brother-in-law, a bossy bad-tempered businessman
- Mr Singh, the owner of the newsagent's shop next door to Povey's Antiquary
- Mrs Millet, Deputy Librarian

== The stories ==
The stories range in subject matter from romance to piracy, in style from police procedural to narrative poetry, in setting from early twentieth century Ireland to ancient China. Most are also morality tales, based on some human weakness such as gluttony or vanity.

- The Clock: A Story of Superstition
- The Writing Box: The Story of a Liar
- The Plate: A Question of Values
- The Table: A Story of Gluttony
- The Harpsichord: A Story of Honour and Trust
- The Umbrella-Stand: A Story of Temper
- The Mirror: A Story of Vanity
- The Roll-Top Chest: A Question of Whodunnit
- The Wooden Chest: A Story of Betrayal
- The Lead Soldier: A Story of Pride
- The Bed: A Story of Horrors Unspeakable

== Literary significance and reception ==
Critics praised the book as lively and entertaining, particularly noting the skill with which its complexity is handled:

From Publishers Weekly: "The author leaps from genre to genre, in the writing equivalent of sleight of hand. Within each tale are surprising twists and turns that overlap and extend the stories-within-stories; McCaughrean pulls off each meta-fictional complexity with finesse and humor."

From the Times Educational Supplement: "The sheer glee of the enterprise is irresistible."

From Growing Point: "Entertainment like this is rare; it should be enjoyed, re-tasted and remembered with pleasure."

McCaughrean won both the Carnegie Medal and the Guardian Prize for A Pack of Lies, the two most prestigious British children's book awards.

Dudley Jones made the book co-subject of a scholarly essay on fiction and metafiction in 1999.

== Notes ==
Awards
| Preceded by The Ghost Drum | Carnegie Medal recipient 1988 | Succeeded by Goggle-Eyes |
