= The Kite Rider =

Children's novel by Geraldine McCaughrean

First edition (publ. OUP)

The Kite Rider is a children's novel by Geraldine McCaughrean.

== Plot ==
The story, set in 13th-century China, concerns a boy named Gou Haoyou. His father Gou Pei, a seaman, is forced to fly on a wind-testing kite by first mate Di Chou. Gou Pei is killed, and Great-uncle Bo, the head of the Gou family, arranges for Pei's beautiful widow, Qing'an, to marry Di Chou. Haoyou and his cousin, Mipeng, get rid of Di Chou and in the process Haoyou flies on a wind testing kite. Miao Jie, who runs the Jade Circus, notices Haoyou's impressive feat, and offers him and Mipeng a position in the circus as a kite rider and Medium respectively.

Haoyou and Mipeng join the circus, and begin traveling to perform for money for their family.

== Characters ==
- Haoyou: very obedient, trustworthy, a good son.
- Mipeng: very smart, cousin of Haoyou
- Qing'an: beautiful, Haoyou's mother
- Pei: Haoyou's father, killed by Di Chou.
- Bo: Haoyou's uncle and leader of the Gou family.
- Mo: Haoyou's aunt.
- Miao: Head of The Jade Circus.
- Di Chou: Alcoholic, mean, wants to marry Haoyou's mother.
