= The Death-Defying Pepper Roux =

2010 book by Geraldine McCaughrean

- The first edition cover.
- Author: Geraldine McCaughrean
- Language: English
- Genre: Children's fiction
- Set in: France
- Publisher: HarperCollins; Oxford University Press
- Publication date: 19 January 2010 (first published 1 October 2009)
- Publication place: United Kingdom
- Media type: Paperback
- Pages: 336
- Awards: 2011 Carnegie Medal nominee
- ISBN: 0061836656

The Death-Defying Pepper Roux is a children's book by British children's author Geraldine McCaughrean.

The book was published by Oxford University Press October 1, 2009 and by HarperCollins January 19, 2010.

== Plot ==
The story is about a boy who was prophecised to die at fourteen. But, as his fourteenth birthday passes, he is still alive and he begins to unravel the truth as the story goes on. He runs away from his home only to find more devils and angels seemingly waiting for him, but none of these angels of death and horses of fire seem to be coming for him. Pepper begins to doubt that he is going to die young and questions the legitimacy of the prophecy. Naïve and trusting, pepper sets a course through dangerous waters, inviting disasters and mayhem at every turn, one eye on the sky for fear of angels, one on the magnificent possibilities of being alive.

== Reception ==
The Death-Defying Pepper Roux received favorable reviews from the Assembly on Literature for Adolescents, The Horn Book, and , as well as starred reviews from Booklist and the School Library Journal.

In 2011, the book was selected for a top ten spot on the American Library Association's Rainbow List and was named in the Top 100 Best Fiction for Young Adults.

The book was also shortlisted for the 2011 CILIP Carnegie Medal.
