= Smile! (novel) =

Children's book by Geraldine McCaughrean

- First edition cover
- Author: Geraldine McCaughrean
- Language: English
- Genre: Children's
- Publisher: Oxford University Press
- Publication date: 1 July 2004
- Publication place: United Kingdom
- Pages: 123 pp
- ISBN: 0-19-271961-0
- OCLC: 56437801
- LC Class: PZ7.M1286 Sm 2004

Smile! is a children's book by Geraldine McCaughrean. In 2004 it won the Nestlé Smarties Book Prize Bronze Award. It is about a photographer stranded in the wilderness with only ten shots left on his Polaroid camera.
