= Stop the Train =

2001 children's novel by Geraldine McCaughrean

- First edition
- Author: Geraldine McCaughrean
- Language: English
- Genre: Historical fiction
- Publisher: Oxford University Press
- Publication date: 18 October 2001
- Publication place: United Kingdom
- Pages: 238 pp
- ISBN: 978-0-19-271901-0
- OCLC: 47271408
- LC Class: PZ7.M1286 St 2001
- Followed by: Pull Out All the Stops!

Stop the Train is a 2001 children's novel by Geraldine McCaughrean. It won the Nestlé Smarties Book Prize Bronze Award, as well as being shortlisted for the Carnegie Medal and the Stockton Children's Book of the Year.

== Plot summary ==
During the Oklahoma Land Run, Cissy and her parents arrive from the east to settle in Florence Town, a new settlement. Within a few days, it becomes apparent that a local railroad company wants to use the land for itself and attempts to purchase it from the people of the town. The townspeople do not want to sell their land, and the director of the railroad company announces that no trains will stop at the town. Suffering hardship through having no railroad connection, the townspeople decide to make efforts – both legal and illegal – to stop the train that passes through their town. The story documents the life of Cissy as she grows and the struggles of the people in the town to make some sort of living. The townsfolk hold a fair to show their community off to a trainload of passengers, hijacked by a group of the town's men. Following the success of the Florence Fair, the passengers pressurise the railroad company to stop ignoring Florence, and boycott the trains. The people of Florence are unaware of this, being so cut off from the rest of Oklahoma, and rumours of a young girl's death under the wheels of a train spark a sabotage of the railway – a length of rail is removed, blocking the road crossing. Realising what damage they might cause and that the people on the train were not the ones responsible for their plight, the townspeople manage to reconstruct the track before the train comes through, thereby averting disaster. They discover the train company has relented and will stop at their station. To pay tribute to the town's new start, and in a gesture of reconciliation towards the railroad company, Florence is renamed Olive, hence the "Olive Branch Line".

The book may be partly influenced by the Enid-Pond Creek Railroad War, and is dedicated to the people of Enid, "who did stop the train".

== Sequel ==
Cissy's story continues in Pull Out All the Stops! (2010), known in the US as The Glorious Adventures of the Sunshine Queen, in which she stays with her former teacher, Miss Loucien, on board an old showboat which hosts the Bright Lights Theatre Company.
