= Neverland (miniseries) =

Fantasy miniseries

- DVD cover
- Genre: Adventure; Fantasy
- Written by: Nick Willing
- Directed by: Nick Willing
- Starring: Rhys Ifans; Anna Friel; Charles Dance; Q'orianka Kilcher; Raoul Trujillo; Cas Anvar; George Aguilar; Bob Hoskins; Charlie Rowe; Keira Knightley
- Theme music composer: Ronan Hardiman
- Countries of origin: United Kingdom; United States

Production
- Producer: Redmond Morris
- Cinematography: Seamus Deasy
- Editor: Allan Lee
- Running time: 161 minutes
- Production companies: Parallel Films; Sky Movies Production

Original release
- Network: Syfy (U.S.); Sky Movies (UK)
- Release: 4 December – 5 December 2011

Neverland is a 2011 fantasy television miniseries that aired on the Syfy network (United States) on December 4 and 5, Sky Movies (United Kingdom) on December 9, and Zee Cinema (India) on December 16. It was written and directed by Nick Willing. It is a prequel to the story of Peter Pan.

== Plot ==
In London, England 1906, thief James "Jimmy" Hook assembles a gang of juvenile street thieves to help him steal a strange glowing orb from an antique store. While carrying out the theft, Hook and the boys vanish. Only Peter Pan, who had been assigned to play lookout, is left. Believing it was a bomb and his friends are dead, Peter takes the orb and returns home.

A man arrives asking for Hook, and Peter decides to follow him, hoping to get information about why Jimmy was hired to steal the orb. He is caught, and introduced to Dr. Richard Fludd, who explains that Hook and the boys are not dead, but have been transported to another world. Peter returns home, where he hits the orb, determined to find his friends and bring them home.

Meanwhile, Hook and the boys find themselves in a strange land and are quickly captured by a band of pirates, led by Captain Elizabeth Bonny. Bonny shows Hook magical dust that comes from the tree spirits that live on the island. The dust gives the power of flight, but she only has a small vial and wants Hook's help in getting more.

Peter finds himself in the middle of a forest, and is reunited with Fox, who managed to avoid being captured. The boys make friends with the natives and meet the chief's daughter, Aaya. They learn that the natives protect the tree spirit colony from the pirates. Peter and Fox rescue their friends from the pirates. Fox is killed during the ensuing fight.

Upon returning to the Native village, a tribal elder shows Peter a painting depicting a scene from a dream they've both had. Aaya recognizes it as a place near their hunting grounds. Peter decides to find the place, hoping to discover a way to return to London. Upon arrival, they meet Dr. Fludd, the royal alchemist for Queen Elizabeth I. He explains that he discovered a planet where time stands still and created the orb as a way of transporting people there. While they plot a way to return Peter and the boys back to London, they are interrupted by the pirates, who kill Fludd, take the orb, and stab Peter. Tinker Bell brings Peter to be healed by the tree spirits in their magical mineral pool.

Hook tells Peter he wants to go back to London and persuades Peter to show him the mountain passage and the mineral pool. Once they reach the passage, Jimmy betrays Peter and reveals that the pirates followed them. Bonnie immerses herself in the mineral dust, but since only the innocent can use the pool, Bonnie instead burns to death and Hook takes over as captain. Furious, Hook reveals with rage to Peter that he was once engaged to his mother and killed his father when he found out about their affair. The tree spirits, angry that Peter led Hook to them, erase Peter's memory. Tinker Bell defends Peter and is ostracized from her people.

The Lost Boys restore Peter's memory and he leads them to the pirates in the hopes of finding the orb. Peter follows Hook to the orb, while the Indians arrive and fight the pirates. Peter duels with Hook, while Aaya leads the Lost Boys against the pirates. While fighting, Tinker Bell is badly injured. Peter finds the orb, but is unable to escape before the cave collapses. At the end of a sword fight, Peter cuts off Hook's hand, and a crocodile swallows it, along with Peter's father's watch, which Hook had stolen after murdering him. Hook asks Peter to kill him, but he refuses because he's not like him.

Some time later, the boys are living with the Natives when they are surprised to see Peter and Tinker Bell reappear. He tells them that he managed to activate the orb before the cave collapsed, returning to London. He stole the London orb, and hid it so no one else can use it, before activating it one last time to return to Neverland. Curly suddenly points out to Peter that his shadow is missing, thus leading into the events of the original story.

== Cast ==
- Charlie Rowe as Peter Pan
- Rhys Ifans as Jimmy Hook
- Anna Friel as Captain Elizabeth Bonny
- Charles Dance as Dr. Richard Fludd
- Q'orianka Kilcher as Aaya
- Bob Hoskins as Mr. Smee (Hoskins also portrayed the character in the 1991 film Hook 20 years prior) (final television role)
- Keira Knightley as Tinker Bell (voice only)
- Charlotte Atkinson as Tinker Bell
- Raoul Trujillo as Holy Man
- George Aguilar as Kaw Chief
- Cas Anvar as Gentleman Starkey
- James Ainsworth as Tootles
- Patrick Gibson as Curly
- Lorn Macdonald as Fox
- Thomas Patten as Twins
- Brandon Robinson as Slightly
- Chase Willoughby as Nibs

== Production ==
Film production took place in Swords, County Dublin, Ireland and Genoa, Italy.
