= Francis Donkin Bedford =

British artist (1864–1954)

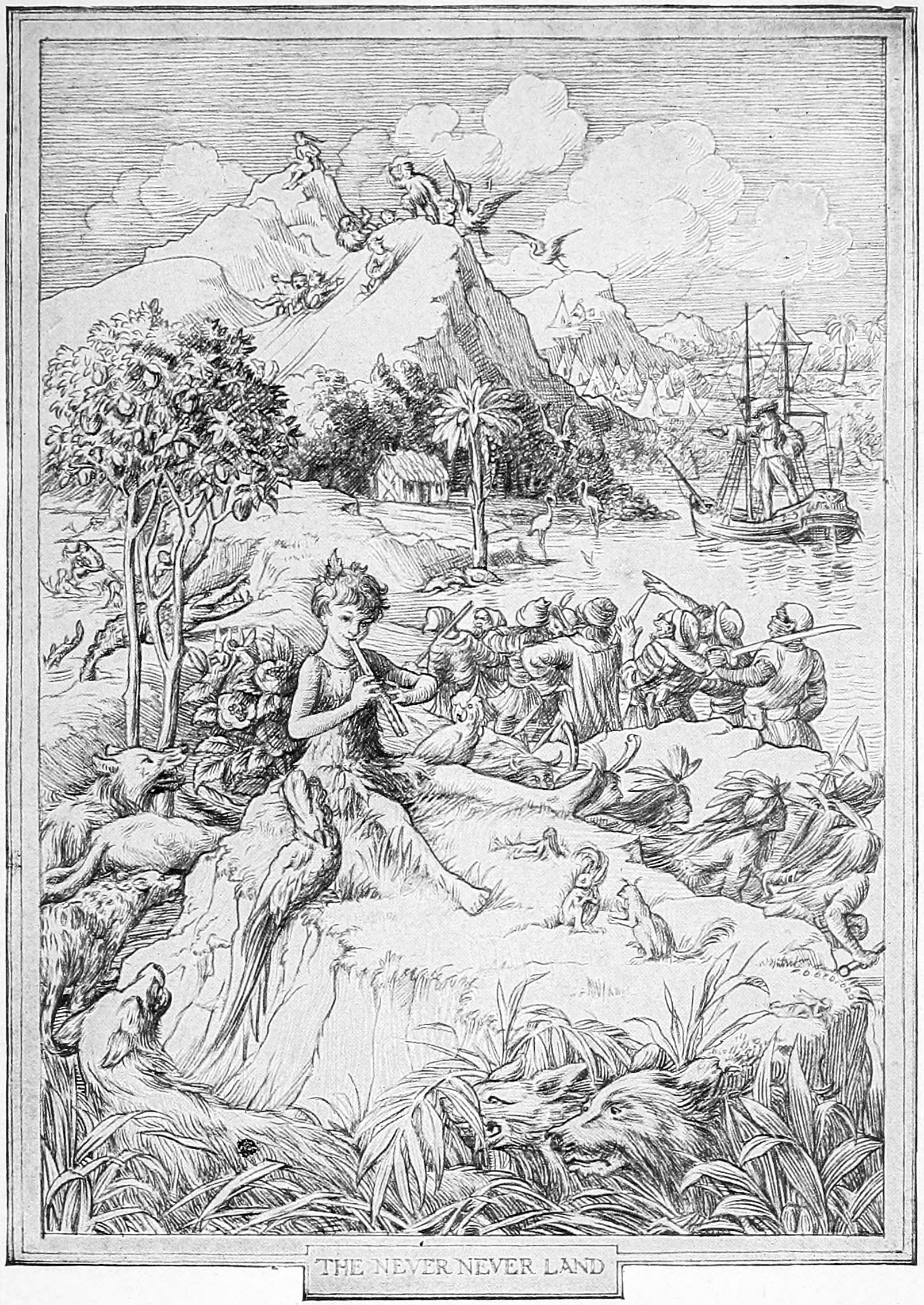
Illustration for Peter and Wendy, 1911

Francis Donkin Bedford (1864–1954), also known as F. D. Bedford, was a British artist and illustrator. He was born in Notting Hill and lived in London. He painted genre scenes and exhibited at the Royal Academy from 1892.

Bedford's works include illustrations for The Battle of the Frogs and Mice (1894), A Book of Nursery Rhymes (1897), The Books of Shops (1899), Four and Twenty Toilers (1900), The Visit to London (1902), Forgotten Tales of Long Ago (1906), Runaways and Castaways (1908), Peter and Wendy (1911), The Magic Fishbone (1921), Under the Tree (1922), A Christmas Carol (1923), and The Cricket on the Hearth (1927).
