= Geraldine McCaughrean =

British children's novelist (born 1951)

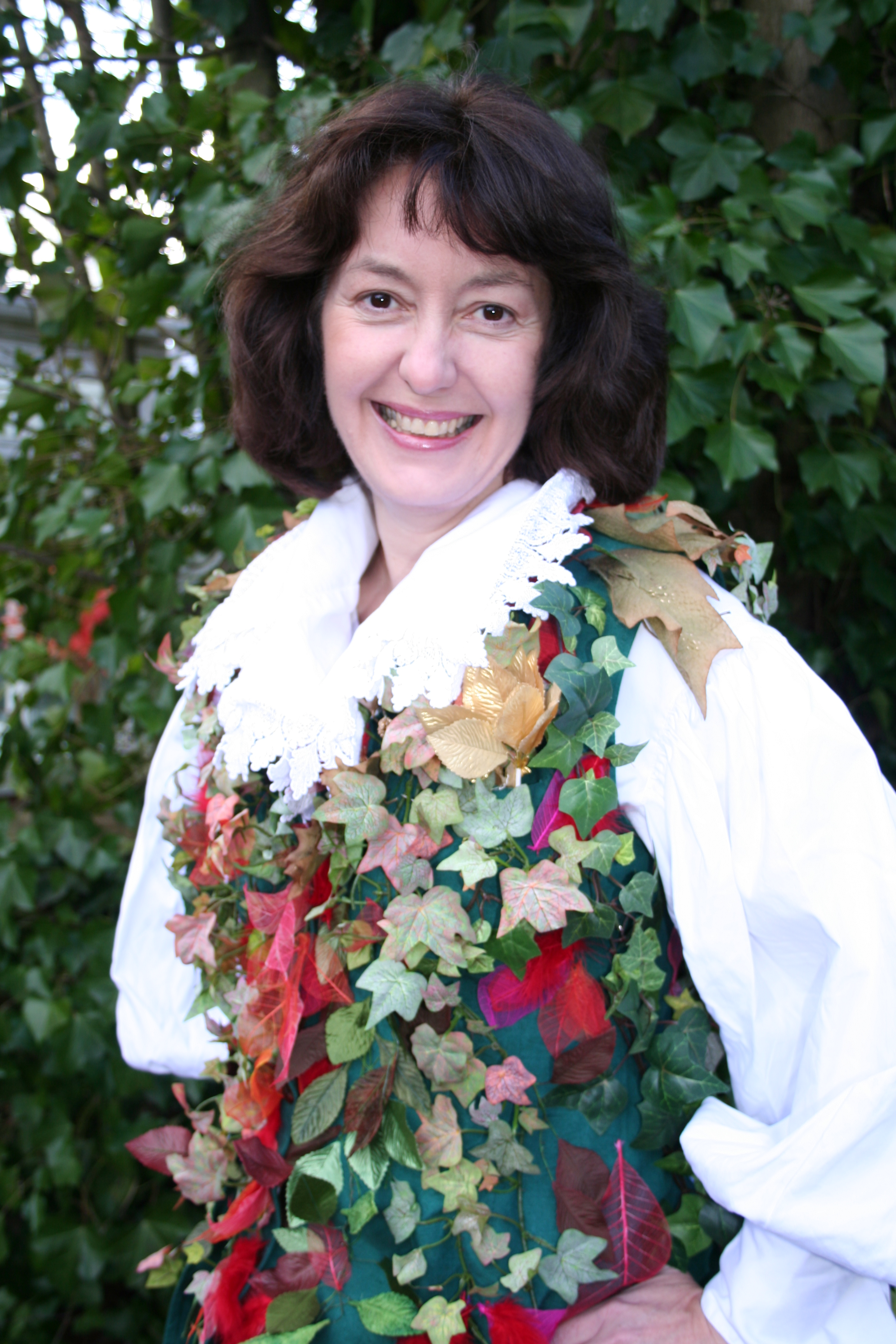
- Born: Geraldine Jones; 6 June 1951 (age 75) London, England
- Occupation: Author of children's books
- Notable works: A Pack of Lies (1988); The Stones Are Hatching (1999); The Kite Rider (2001); Stop the Train (2001); Smile! (2004); Peter Pan in Scarlet (2006); The Death-Defying Pepper Roux (2010); Where the World Ends (2017); The White Darkness (2020)
- Notable awards: Whitbread Award for Children's Book (1987, 1994, 1996, 2004); Carnegie Medal (1988, 2018); Guardian Children's Fiction Prize (1989); Blue Peter Book Award (2000, 2001); Michael L. Printz Award (2008)
- Spouse: John McCaughrean
- Children: 1

Geraldine McCaughrean (/məˈkɔːkrən/ mə-KAWK-rən; born 6 June 1951) is a British children's novelist. She has written more than 170 books, including Peter Pan in Scarlet (2004), the official sequel to Peter Pan commissioned by Great Ormond Street Hospital. She has received the Carnegie Medal twice and the Michael L. Printz Award among others.

== Personal life and education ==
McCaughrean was born 6 June 1951 in London to Leslie Arthur and Ethel Jones. The youngest of three children, she grew up in North London. McCaughrean attended Enfield County Grammar School for Girls and then Southgate Technical College from 1969 to 1970, then received a Bachelor of Education with honors from Christ Church College, Canterbury in 1977.

McCaughrean is married to John McCaughrean, with whom she has a daughter: Ailsa.

== Career ==
McCaughrean studied teaching but found her true vocation in writing. She claims that what makes her love writing is the desire to escape from an unsatisfactory world. Her motto is: do not write about what you know, write about what you want to know.

McCaughrean's work includes many retellings of classic stories for children: The Odyssey, El Cid, The Canterbury Tales, The Pilgrim's Progress, Moby Dick, One Thousand and One Arabian Nights and Gilgamesh.

J. M. Barrie gave all rights to Peter Pan to Great Ormond Street Hospital in 1929, and in 2004, to coincide with Peter Pan's centenary, the hospital launched a competition to find the author of a sequel. McCaughrean won the competition, after submitting a synopsis and a sample chapter. Peter Pan in Scarlet was released internationally on 5 October 2006, published in the UK by Oxford University Press and in the US by Simon & Schuster.

McCaughrean has written many other children's fiction books including The Kite Rider, The Stones Are Hatching, and Plundering Paradise. She has also written six historical novels for adults including: The Maypole (1990), Fire's Astonishment (1991), Lovesong (1996) and The Ideal Wife (1997).

As of 2013, McCaughrean has launched an online novel based on the Hylas and Hercules myth, A Thousand Kinds of Ugly.

== Awards and honours ==
For her lifetime contribution as a children's writer, McCaughrean was the British nominee in 2004 for the biennial, international Hans Christian Andersen Award, the highest international recognition available to creators of children's books. She was elected an Honorary Fellow of Canterbury Christ Church University in 2006 and a Fellow of the English Association in 2010. She has been a Fellow of the Royal Society of Literature since 2010.

Four of McCaughrean's books are Junior Library Guild selections: Not the End of the World (2005), The White Darkness (2007), The Glorious Adventures of the Sunshine Queen (2011), and Where the World Ends (2020).

In 2002, The Horn Book Magazine included The Kite Rider on their list of the best children's fiction of the year.

In 2020, Booklist included Where the World Ends on their "Top 10 Historical Fiction for Youth" list.

Awards for McCaughrean's writing
Year	Title	Award	Result	Ref.
1987	A Little Lower Than the Angels	Whitbread Award for Children's Book	Winner	
1988	A Pack of Lies	Carnegie Medal	Winner	
1989	A Pack of Lies	Guardian Children's Fiction Prize	Winner	
1994	Gold Dust	Whitbread Award for Children's Book	Winner	
1996	Plundering Paradise	Nestlé Smarties Book Prize (6–8 years)	Bronze	
1996	Plundering Paradise	Whitbread Award for Children's Book	Shortlist	
2000	A Pilgrim's Progress	Blue Peter Book Award for Book of the Year	Winner	
2001	The Kite Rider	Blue Peter Book Award for Best Book to Keep Forever	Winner	
2001	The Kite Rider	Nestlé Smarties Book Prize (9–11 years)	Bronze	
2002	Stop the Train	Nestlé Smarties Book Prize (9–11 years)	Bronze	
2002	Stop the Train	Carnegie Medal	Highly commended	
2004	Smile!	Nestlé Smarties Book Prize (6–8 years)	Bronze	
2004	Not the End of the World	Whitbread Award for Children's Book	Winner	
2005	The White Darkness	Whitbread Award for Children's Book	Shortlist	
2006	A Pack of Lies	ALSC Notable Children's Recordings	Selection	
2007	The White Darkness	Booklist Editors' Choice: Books for Youth	Selection	
2007	Stop the Train!	Amazing Audiobooks for Young Adults|	Selection	
2008	The White Darkness	ALA Best Fiction for Young Adults	Selection	
2008	The White Darkness	Michael L. Printz Award	Winner	
2011	The Death-Defying Pepper Roux	ALA Best Fiction for Young Adults	Selection	
2011	The Death-Defying Pepper Roux	American Library Association Rainbow List	Top 10	
2018	Where the World Ends	Carnegie Medal	Winner	
2018	Where the World Ends	Independent Bookshop Week Book Award	Winner	
2020	Where the World Ends	Michael L. Printz Award	Honor	

== Selected bibliography ==
- A Little Lower Than the Angels (1987)
- A Pack of Lies (1988)
- Gold Dust (1993)
- Blue Moon Mountain (1994)
- Plundering Paradise (1996) (US title: The Pirate's Son)
- Forever X (1997)
- The Stones Are Hatching (1999)
- The Great Chase (2000)
- Stop the Train! (2001)
- The Kite Rider (2001)
- Showstopper! (2003)
- Smile! (2004)
- Not the End of the World (2004)
- The White Darkness (2005)
- Cyrano (2006)
- Peter Pan in Scarlet (2006)
- Tamburlaine's Elephants (2007)
- The Death-Defying Pepper Roux (2009)
- Pull Out All The Stops! (2010) (US title: The Glorious Adventures of the Sunshine Queen)
- Robin Hood & the Golden Arrow and a World of Other Stories (2011)
- The Positively Last Performance (2013)
- The Middle of Nowhere (2013)
- Where the World Ends (2017)
- The Supreme Lie (2021)
