= Wendy & Peter Pan =

2013 play

- Written by: Ella Hickson
- Based on: Peter Pan by J.M. Barrie
- Setting: Winter 1908, London and Neverland

Premiere
- Date: 10 December 2013
- Place: Royal Shakespeare Theatre, Stratford-upon-Avon

Wendy & Peter Pan is a play by Ella Hickson, adapted from the original play and novel Peter Pan by J.M. Barrie. The play is a re-telling of the classic children's story which features Wendy Darling as the protagonist who flies away with Peter Pan to Neverland.

== Background ==
Playwright Ella Hickson was commissioned to write a new adaptation of Peter Pan for the Christmas show in Gregory Doran's first season as artistic director of the Royal Shakespeare Company for winter 2013.

This version of the classic children's story is told through Wendy Darling's perspective as she meets Peter Pan, the boy who never grows up. She and her brothers, John and Michael, fly away with Pan and Tinker Bell to Neverland where they meet with the Lost Boys and battle the evil Captain Hook. This feminist re-working of the story prominently discovers some of the darker themes within the original story and introduces some new characters, such as Tom, a fourth child of the Darling family.

== Productions ==
=== Stratford-upon-Avon (2013–14) and (2015–16) ===
The play had its premiere on 10 December 2013 where it ran at the Royal Shakespeare Theatre in Stratford-Upon-Avon until 2 March 2014. The production was directed by Jonathan Munby, designed by Colin Richmond, music by Oliver Fox and Jason Carr, lighting by Oliver Fenwick, sound by Christopher Shutt and fights by Terry King.

For Christmas 2015 the production was revived by the RSC at the Royal Shakespeare Theatre where it began on 25 November 2015, with previews from 17 November, and ran until 31 January 2016. The play had received some changes from the 2013 production, such as new changes to the score by Oliver Fox and Jason Carr, new script and scene changes including flying and fighting scenes. Many members of the cast had also changed from the previous production.

=== Edinburgh (2018–19) ===
A new production directed by Eleanor Rhode, starring Isobel McArthur as Wendy Darling and Ziggy Heath as Peter Pan, ran at the Lyceum Theatre, Edinburgh from 29 November 2018 to 5 January 2019.

=== Leeds (2021–22) ===
A revival was commissioned as part of the Christmas 2022 season at the Leeds Playhouse, with original director Jonathan Munby returning. It was previously performed as part of the 2020 Summer Olympics in Tokyo at the Bunkamura in summer 2021.

=== London (2025) ===
The Bunkamura/Leeds production is opened as part of the RSC's Autumn season at the Barbican Centre, London from 21 October to 22 November 2025, with original director Jonathan Munby again returning. Toby Stephens starred as Mr Darling/Captain Hook.

The production received a nomination for Best Casting of Theatre at the 2026 Casting Directors' Guild Awards.

== Characters and cast ==
Character	Stratford-upon Avon		Leeds	London
Character	2013	2015	2021	2025
Wendy	Fiona Button	Mariah Gale	Amber James	Hannah Saxby
John	Jolyon Coy	James Corrigan	Corey Montague-Sholay	Fred Woodley Adams
Michael	Brodie Ross	Jordan Metcalfe	Stefan Race	Kwaku Mills
Tom	Colin Ryan	Sam Clemmett	David Carpenter	Alexander Molony
Mrs Darling	Rebecca Johnson	Rebecca Johnson	Amy Rockson	Lolita Chakrabarti
Mr Darling	Andrew Woodwall	Partick Tomboy	David Birrell	Toby Stephens
Skylights	Andrew Woodwall	Partick Tomboy	Jason Battersby	John Sodiq Akanmu
Doc Giles/Crocodile/Shadow	Arthur Kyeyune	Arthur Kyeyune	Leon Smith	Harrison Claxton
Peter Pan	Sam Swann	Rhys Rusbatch	Pierro Niel-Mee	Daniel Krikler
Tink	Charlotte Mills	Charlotte Mills	Hope Kenna	Charlotte Mills
Tootles	Josh Williams	Lawrence Walker	Callum Balmforth	Kyle Ndukuba
Curly	Dafyyd Llyr Thomas	Douggie McMeekin	James Steventon	Tom Xander
Slightly	Will Merrick	Harry Waller	Richard Leeming	Max Lauder
Nibs	Jack Monaghan	Cavan Clarke	—N/a	—N/a
Captain Hook	Guy Henry	Darrel D'Silva	David Birrell	Toby Stephens
Smee	Gregory Gudgeon	Paul Kemp	Brian Lonsdale	Scott Karim
Doc Swain	Guy Rhys	Dan Wheeler	Cassidy Little	Guy Rhys
Knock Bone Jones	Richard Clews	David Langham	Hadley Smith	Hadley Smith
Murt The Bat	Dodger Phillips	Dodger Phillips	Ramône Dale-Cruickhank	Marcello Walton
Martin	Jamie Wilkes	Adam Gillen	Thomas Pickles	Joe Hewetson
Tiger Lily	Michelle Asante	Mimi Ndiweni	Ami Okumura Jones	Ami Tredrea
Peter's Shadow	Martin Costane	Simon Carroll-Jones	Jason Battersby	Christopher Jeffries
Shadow	Simon Carroll-Jones	Jay Webb	Peter Losasso	Joe Anthony
Shadow	Susan Hingley	Susan Hingley	Kelvin Ade	James Berkery
Shadow	Emily Holt	Laura Prior	Simone Lewis	Kazmin Borrer
Shadow	Jack Horner	Jack Horner	Richard P. Peralta	Lili Evangeline-Bryden
Shadow	—N/a	—N/a	Leon Smith	Alexander Kranz
Shadow	—N/a	—N/a	Xolani Crabtree	Meg Matthews

Since the 2021 Leeds production, Mr Darling and Captain Hook are played by the same actor.
