= Isabel Deroy-Olson =

Canadian actress

- Born: 2005 (age 20–21)
- Occupation: Actress
- Years active: 2022–present

Isabel Deroy-Olson is a Canadian actress. She is best known for playing Kara Two-Rivers in the mystery series Three Pines and Billie Tsosie in the thriller series Dark Winds.

== Early life ==
Deroy-Olson is from Vancouver, Canada. She is ethnically part of the Trʼondëk Hwëchʼin First Nation. Growing up she was a member of a dance studio.

== Career ==
One of her first big roles came playing Kara Two-Rivers in the mystery series Three Pines. She portrayed Roki, one of the two lead characters in the drama film Fancy Dance alongside Lily Gladstone. Gladstone was so impressed that she recommended Olson played her younger self in the drama miniseres Under the Bridge. Her biggest role so far has been playing Billie Tsosie in season 4 of the thriller series Dark Winds.

In 2026 she was announced as starring in a drama film called Tombs alongside other indigenous actors such as Amber Midthunder and Cara Jade Myers for director Marie Clements; the film is slated to premiere at the 2026 Toronto International Film Festival under the release title How We Stand.

== Filmography ==
=== Film ===
Year	Title	Role	Notes
2023	Fancy Dance	Roki	
2023	Hairy Beast	Maria	Short
2026	How We Stand		

=== Television ===
Year	Title	Role	Notes
2022	Shadow of the Rougarou	Young sakowew	4 episodes
2022	16 Hudson	Girl	2 episodes
2022	Three Pines	Kara Two-Rivers	6 episodes
2024	Under the Bridge	Young Cam	Episode: "In Water They Sink as the Same"
2025	It: Welcome to Derry	Kino	Episode: "The Great Swirling Apparatus of Our Planet's Function"
2026	Marshals	Hayley Charlo	2 episodes
2026	Dark Winds	Billie Tsosie	8 episodes
