= Alyssa Wapanatâhk =

Canadian actress

Alyssa Wapanatahk
- Born: January 15, 1998 (age 28); Fort McMurray, Alberta, Canada
- Occupation: Actress
- Years active: 2018–present

Alyssa Wapanatahk is a Cree actress from Canada. She is best known for playing Tiger Lily in the fantasy film Peter Pan & Wendy and plays White Sun in the reboot Little House on the Prairie.

== Early life ==
Wapanatahk was born in Fort McMurray, Alberta. She moved to Vancouver where she gained a diploma for acting from the New Image College. Growing up she had no interest in becoming an actress. It was only after her mothers friend, who is in the industry encouraged her to go for an audition.

== Career ==
Wapanatahk played Perseverance Spears in the drama film Bones of Crows. For her performance she was nominated for a Leo Award for best supporting performance by a female in a motion picture Her first big role came playing Tiger Lily in the fantasy film Peter Pan & Wendy. In May 2025 it was announced she would be cast as White Sun in the upcoming reboot Little House on the Prairie. She will appear in the upcoming drama film Tombs alongside fellow indigenous actresses Amber Midthunder and Cara Jade Myers.

== Personal life ==
In 2019 she gave birth to a daughter named Nitanis. She is a member of the Bigstone Cree First Nation and her reservation is Wabasca.

== Filmography ==
=== Film ===
Year	Title	Role	Notes
2018	Pure Love	Girl	Short film
2018	Robo Games	Girl	Short film
2018	Pookmis	Sam	Short film
2018	The Turning Point	Alissa	Short film
2019	Swansong	Zoe	Short film
2022	Bones of Crows	Perseverance Spears	
2022	Rehab	Chloe Cardinal	
2023	Peter Pan & Wendy	Tiger Lily	
2025	Cottonmouth	Sophia	
2026	How We Stand		
TBA	The Keeper	Sarah	Pre-production

=== Television ===
Year	Title	Role	Notes
2023	Riverdale	Lizzo	Recurring role (season 7)
2023	Bones of Crows: The Series	Perseverance Spears	2 episodes
2026	Little House on the Prairie	White Sun	Main role
