= Alexander Molony =

British actor

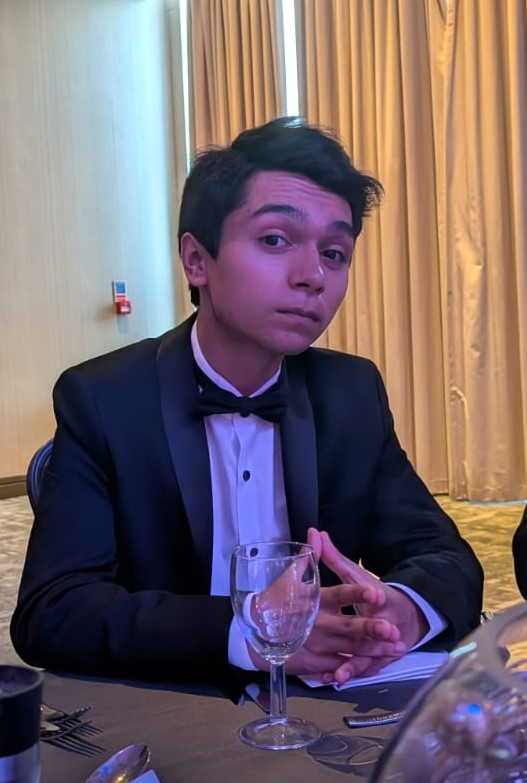
- Molony at a Trinity School alumni event in 2025
- Born: 12 September 2006 (age 19); United Kingdom
- Other name: Alex Molony
- Occupation: Actor
- Years active: 2017–present

Alexander Molony (born 12 September 2006) is a British actor, who starred as Peter Pan in the 2023 Disney film Peter Pan & Wendy. He is an alumnus of Trinity School of John Whitgift in Croydon.

== Early career ==
In 2017, he performed the lead voice role in the children's animated television series Claude, on Disney Junior. He played the son of comedian Romesh Ranganathan in the Sky sitcom The Reluctant Landlord, voiced Ooo-Ooo the Monkey in Raa Raa the Noisy Lion, and voiced Alex the Chick in The Big Bad Fox and Other Tales. He appeared as Young Macduff in the Royal Shakespeare Company's production of Macbeth at the Barbican, alongside Christopher Eccleston and Niamh Cusack.

== Breakthrough ==
In March 2020, Molony was confirmed to be starring as Peter Pan in a new live-action Disney movie. In 2023, Peter Pan & Wendy was released, starring Molony, Jude Law, and Ever Anderson. In 2022 he played Victor in The Bad Seed Returns, alongside Mckenna Grace. In August 2025 it was announced that Molony would be playing the role of Tom Darling in Wendy and Peter Pan with the Royal Shakespeare Company, opposite Toby Stephens as Captain Hook.

== Personal life ==
Molony plays cricket, and performs in various orchestras as a bassoonist. He lives in Bromley, Greater London, and serves as a Crash Crusader ambassador for the charity Rhino Revolution.

== Filmography ==
=== Film ===
Year	Title	Role	Notes
2017	The Big Bad Fox and Other Tales...	Alex	Voice role (English dub)
2023	Peter Pan & Wendy	Peter Pan	
2026	Overtones †	Sam	Short, post-production

=== Television ===
Year	Title	Role	Notes
2017	Raa Raa the Noisy Lion	Ooo-Ooo the Monkey	Voice role (2 episodes)
2017	Claude	Claude	Voice role (34 episodes)
2018	The CFF Story	Himself	Documentary
2018–2019	The Reluctant Landlord	Charlie	12 episodes
2022	The Bad Seed Returns	Victor	Television film
2023	Burning Questions	Himself	1 episode
2023	Disney Movie Insider Presents	Himself	1 episode
2023	Entertainment Tonight	Himself	2 episodes

=== Stage ===
Year	Title	Role	Venue
2017	Bodies	Boy	Royal Court Theatre
2017	South Pacific (musical)	Jerome	Cadogan Hall
2018	Macbeth	Young Macduff	Barbican Theatre
2025	Wendy and Peter Pan	Tom Darling	Barbican Theatre
