= Arclight Films =

Australian film production company

Arclight Films International Pty Ltd.
- Type: Privately held company (Pty Ltd)
- Industry: Films
- Genre: Independent films
- Founded: 2002
- Founder: Gary Hamilton
- Headquarters: Sydney, Australia, Australia
- Area served: Locations: Sydney, Australia; Los Angeles, California, United States
- Key people: Gary Hamilton (CEO)
- Website: https://arclightfilms.com

Arclight Films International Pty Ltd. is a film sales, production, and finance company based in Sydney, and Los Angeles, United States. Founded in 2002 by Gary Hamilton, who still runs it, the company also operates the film production brands Darclight, Easternlight, and Simmons/Hamilton Productions.

== History ==
Arclight Films was established as a private film sales company in Sydney by Gary Hamilton in 2002. Hamilton, who was born in Sydney, had previously worked for the Australian Film Commission in London advising producers on securing funding and distribution deals. After his return to Australia he worked at Beyond Films, a sales agency that sold Australian classics such as Strictly Ballroom and Lantana.

In 2004 the company relocated to Los Angeles, where it sold films such as Crash (2004), Lord of War (2005), and The Bank Job (2008), before expanding into Asian cinema, in particular films from China and Hong Kong.

The company moved into film production around 2010. Starting with low-budget films, the company gradually started producing larger projects, with the average budget around $20m-$30m by 2022.

At the beginning of the COVID-19 pandemic in 2020, the company relocated to Sydney. In 2022, Hamilton was aiming to produce some films in the US again, but intended to maintain around half of their work in Australia.

In May 2023 Hamilton announced the creation of a new production company in partnership with American rock band Kiss bassist Gene Simmons, called Simmons/Hamilton Productions. Simmons has previous experience in film and television production. They aim to produce 25 films over five years, focusing on action, thriller, and franchise titles. The first title is Deep Water directed by Finnish filmmaker Renny Harlin, produced by Simmons, Hamilton, Ying Ye, and Rob Van Norden. Magenta Light Studios acquired US distribution rights to the film in February 2025.

In November 2023 Arclight partnered with distribution services manager Digital Cinema United (DCU) to directly distribute its library of over 300 titles on global AVoD, TVoD, and SVoD platforms such as iTunes, Amazon, Roku, and Tubi.

Production wrapped on the American thriller Icefall, starring Joel Kinnaman, in Bulgaria in June 2024.

== Description ==
Arclight Films is a film sales, production, and finance company, located in Sydney and Los Angeles.

Hamilton's wife and co-managing director of the company is Ying Ye, and Brian Beckmann is CFO.

Arclight also operates the brands Easternlight, co-producing films for the Asian market, and Darclight, which represents genre titles like the Wolf Creek films and TV series.

== Selected filmography ==
This lists films in which the company has been involved in production.

=== Arclight ===
- First Reformed (2017, by Paul Schrader)
- Hotel Mumbai (2018) First Reformed (2017)
- Possessor (2020, by Brandon Cronenberg)
- Seriously Red (2022)
- The Portable Door (2023, by Jeffrey Walker)
- Poker Face (2022, by Russell Crowe)
- Icefall (2025)

=== Darclight ===
- Bait 3D (2012; the highest grossing Australian release in China)

The Wolf Creek series

- Wolf Creek (2005 horror film)
- Wolf Creek 2 (2013 sequel film)
- Wolf Creek, (2016 television series)

=== Easternlight ===
- Triple Threat (2019)
- Furie (2019)

=== Simmons/Hamilton Productions ===
- Deep Water (2026)
