= Gyúró =

- Village
- Coat of arms

- Location of Fejér county in Hungary

- Location of Gyúró
- Coordinates: 47.36828°N 18.73681°E
- Country: Hungary
- County: Fejér

Area
  - Total: 24.37 km^{2} (9.41 sq mi)

Population (2024)
  - Total: 1,347
  - Density: 51.49/km^{2} (133.4/sq mi)
- Time zone: UTC+1 (CET)
  - Summer (DST): UTC+2 (CEST)
- Postal code: 2464
- Area code: 22
- Website: www.gyuro.hu

Gyúró is a village in Fejér county, Hungary.
