= Natasha Romanoff (Marvel Cinematic Universe) =

Character in the Marvel Cinematic Universe

- Marvel Cinematic Universe character
- Scarlett Johansson as Natasha Romanoff / Black Widow in The Avengers (2012)
- First appearance: Iron Man 2 (2010)
- Last appearance: Black Widow (2021)
- Based on: Black Widow by: Stan Lee; Don Rico; Don Heck
- Adapted by: Justin Theroux
- Portrayed by: Scarlett Johansson; Ever Anderson (young)
- Voiced by: Lake Bell (What If...?)

In-universe information
- Full name: Natalia Alianovna Romanova
- Aliases: Black Widow; Natalie Rushman; Agent Romanoff
- Nickname: Nat
- Occupation: Leader of the Avengers (Note: As depicted in the 2019 film Avengers: Endgame.); Agent of S.H.I.E.L.D.; Assassin; Soviet spy; Spy
- Affiliation: Avengers; Stark Industries; S.H.I.E.L.D.; S.T.R.I.K.E.; KGB; Red Room
- Weapon: Various firearms; Dual Glock 26 handguns; Dual batons; "Widow's Bite" electrified bracelets
- Family: Ivan Romanov (father); Alexei Shostakov (adoptive father); Melina Vostokoff (adoptive mother); Yelena Belova (adoptive sister)
- Origin: Soviet Union
- Nationality: Russian-American

Natalia Alianovna Romanova, more commonly known as Natasha Romanoff, is a fictional character primarily portrayed by Scarlett Johansson in the Marvel Cinematic Universe (MCU) media franchise based on the Marvel Comics character of the same name. Romanoff is depicted as an expert spy, trained in the Russian-based Red Room from childhood to become a Black Widow assassin. She was later recruited by Clint Barton to join the United States government agency S.H.I.E.L.D., adopting the alias Black Widow.

Romanoff is later recruited as a member of the Avengers Initiative where she assists the team in taking down various supervillains including Loki, and Ultron. She has also been a strong ally of Tony Stark and Steve Rogers. Following the Avengers Civil War, Romanoff becomes a fugitive and reunites with her adopted family, including her sister Yelena Belova, to destroy General Dreykov's Red Room program. After Thanos initiates the Blip, Romanoff leads the Avengers for five years until she sacrifices herself to obtain the Soul Stone, successfully helping the team restore everyone.

Johansson first portrayed the character in Iron Man 2 (2010) and went on to become a central character in the franchise, appearing in nine films including her final live-action appearance in Black Widow (2021). Her portrayal was met with positive reception. Alternate versions of the character also appeared in the animated Disney+ series What If...? (2021), voiced by Lake Bell. These versions include an incarnation of Romanoff who was recruited into the Guardians of the Multiverse by the Watcher.

== Development ==
=== Concept, creation and casting ===
In January 2009, Marvel entered early talks with Emily Blunt to play Black Widow in Iron Man 2, though she was unable to take the role due to a previous commitment to star in Gulliver's Travels. During her interview on The Howard Stern Show on May 11, 2021, Blunt revealed to Howard Stern that she was forced by contractual obligation to appear in that film, because of a two-picture deal with Fox when she starred in The Devil Wears Prada.

In March 2009, Scarlett Johansson signed on to play Natasha Romanoff / Black Widow, with her deal including options for multiple films. Johansson then reprised the role in The Avengers (2012), Captain America: The Winter Soldier (2014), Avengers: Age of Ultron (2015), Captain America: Civil War (2016), Avengers: Infinity War (2018), Captain Marvel (in a brief mid-credits appearance), and in a leading role in Avengers: Endgame (2019). After the release of Age of Ultron, Johansson revealed that the number of films on her contract had been adjusted since she first signed to match the "demand of the character", as Marvel had not anticipated the audience's "great reaction" to the character and her performance. In September 2010, while promoting the home media release of Iron Man 2, Marvel Studios President Kevin Feige indicated interest in producing a solo Black Widow film, and stated that discussions with Johansson had already taken place regarding a Black Widow standalone film, but that Marvel's focus was on 2012's The Avengers.

=== Black Widow solo film ===
In 2004, Lionsgate acquired the film rights for Black Widow, and in April announced that a Black Widow motion picture, featuring the Natasha Romanova version, was in the script stage by screenwriter-director David Hayter, with Avi Arad producing. By June 2006, Lionsgate had dropped the project, and the rights to the character reverted to Marvel. Hayter and Marvel tried getting another financier to develop the project, but Hayter "never felt comfortable that we had found a place that was willing to take the movie, and the character, seriously." This left Hayter "heartbroken", but he hoped the film would be made "some day".

In February 2014, Feige stated that, after exploring Black Widow's past in Age of Ultron, he would like to see it explored further in a solo film, which already had development work done for it, including a "pretty in depth" treatment by Nicole Perlman, who co-wrote Marvel's Guardians of the Galaxy (2014). The following April, Johansson expressed interest in starring in a Black Widow film, and said that it would be driven by demand from the audience. That July, Hayter expressed interest in reviving the project for Marvel, and the following month, director Neil Marshall stated that he "would love to do a Black Widow film," saying he felt the character was "really interesting [given] she doesn't have any superpowers, she just has extraordinary skills, and the world that she comes from, being this ex-K.G.B. assassin, I find that really fascinating." In April 2015, Johansson spoke more on the possibility of a solo Black Widow film, seeing the potential to explore the different "layers" of her depicted in the different films so far, but also stating that "right now I think this character is used well in this part of the universe". While promoting Captain America: Civil War the next April, Feige noted that due to the announced schedule of films, any potential Black Widow film would be four or five years away. He added that Marvel was "creatively and emotionally" committed to making a Black Widow film eventually.

In July 2016, Joss Whedon, the director of The Avengers and Avengers: Age of Ultron, stated that he was open to directing a Black Widow film, feeling he could make "a spy thriller. Like really do a good, paranoid, 'John le Carré on crack' sort of thing." In October, Johansson discussed the potential film being a prequel, saying, "you can bring it back to Russia. You could explore the Widow program. There's all kinds of stuff that you could do with it." She did caution she may not want to "wear a skin-tight catsuit" for much longer. The next February, Johansson said that she would dedicate herself to making any potential Black Widow film "amazing. It would have to be the best version that movie could possibly be. Otherwise, I would never do it ... [it would] have to be its own standalone and its own style and its own story." Following the development work done and the public support for a Black Widow film to be made, Marvel ultimately decided that the "best time to move forward with the project" would be at the beginning of the "latest phase" of the MCU in 2020.

In January 2018, Jac Schaeffer was hired to write the script. Marvel sought a female director for the project, part of a priority push by major film studios to hire female directors for franchises. Cate Shortland had the backing of Johansson, a fan of the director's previous female-starring film Lore (2012), and was hired in July to direct Black Widow. The Hollywood Reporter reported in October 2018 that Johansson would earn $15 million to appear in the film, an increase from the "low-seven figure salary" she earned for starring in The Avengers. The $15 million was equal to what Chris Evans and Chris Hemsworth each earned in Captain America: Civil War, Thor: Ragnarok, Avengers: Infinity War, and Avengers: Endgame. Despite The Hollywood Reporter confirming the amount from "multiple knowledgable sources", Marvel Studios disputed the accuracy of the numbers while stating that they "never publicly disclose salaries or deal terms." The film was expected to be released in May 2020, but was delayed twice due to the COVID-19 pandemic, with the new release date being July 9, 2021. On July 29, 2021, Johansson filed a lawsuit against Disney claiming the company's release of the film simultaneously on Disney+ and in theaters was a breach of contract, as her pay was tied into the box office performance of the film, which was allegedly impacted by its release on Disney+.

== Characterization ==
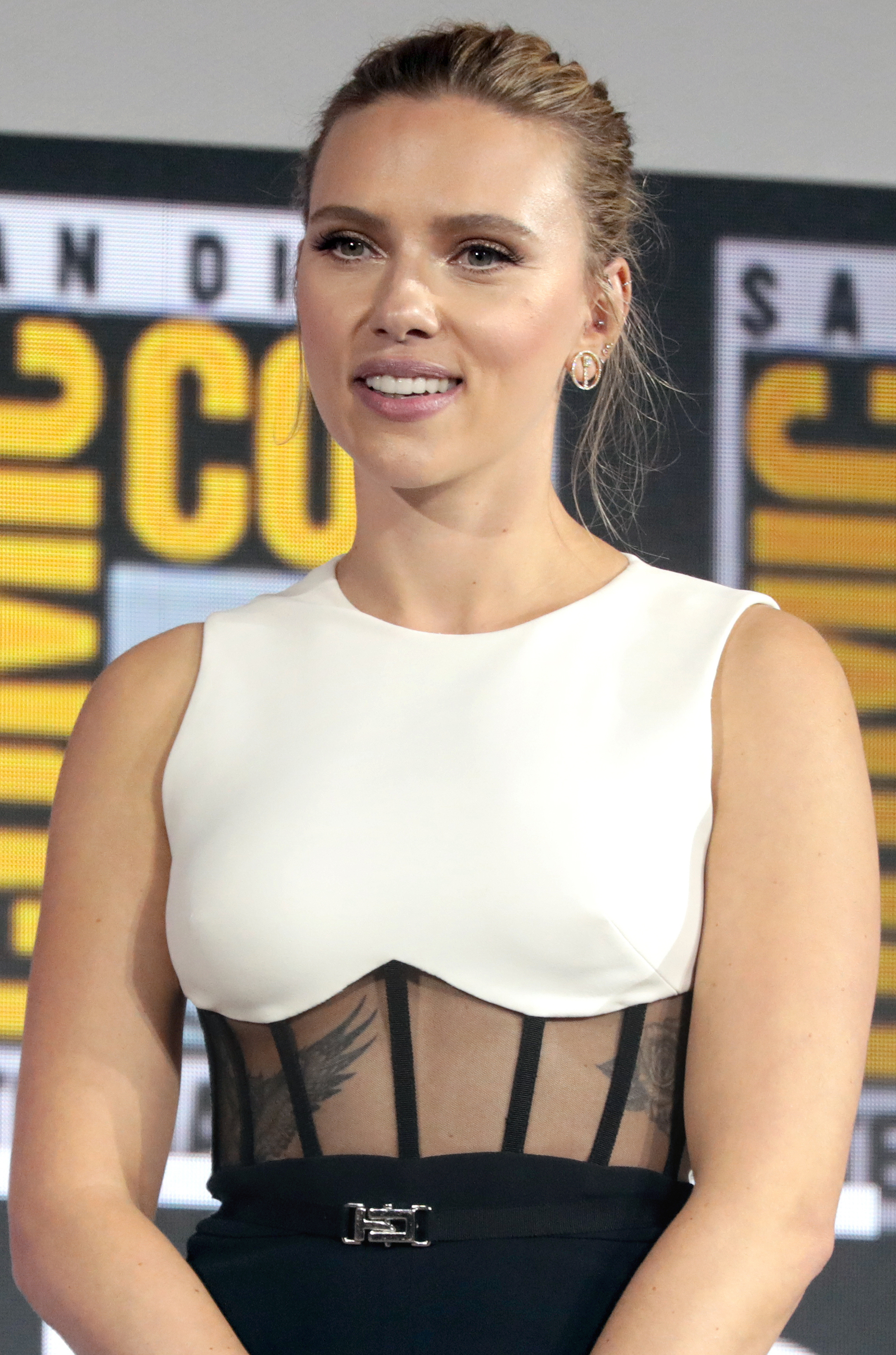
Scarlett Johansson speaking on the Black Widow panel at the 2019 Comic-Con in San Diego, California

In Iron Man 2, Romanoff is introduced as Natalie Rushman, an undercover spy for S.H.I.E.L.D. posing as Stark's new assistant. Johansson dyed her hair red before she landed the part, hoping that it would help convince Favreau that she was right for the role. Johansson said that she chose the role because "the Black Widow character resonated with me... [She] is a superhero, but she's also human. She's small, but she's strong... She is dark and has faced death so many times that she has a deep perspective on the value of life... It's hard not to admire her." She stated that she had "a bit of a freak-out moment" when she first saw the cat-suit. When asked about fighting in the costume, Johansson responded,

"[A] big part of me is like 'can I move in this? Can I run in it? Can I like throw myself over things with this?' And I think just the prep, you just have to put in the hours. That's what I realized is that just putting in the hours and doing the training and repetition and basically just befriending the stunt team and spending all day, every day, just over and over and over and over until you sell it."

In The Avengers, the character's close friendship with Clint Barton is indicated, about which Johansson said,

"Our characters have a long history. They've fought together for a long time in a lot of battles in many different countries. We're the two members of this avenging group who are skilled warriors – we have no superpowers. Black Widow is definitely one of the team, though. She's not in the cast simply to be a romantic foil or eye candy. She's there to fight, so I never felt like I was the only girl. We all have our various skills and it feels equal".

Regarding her training, Johansson said, "Even though Iron Man 2 was 'one-for-them,' I'd never done anything like that before. I'd never been physically driven in something, or a part of something so big. For The Avengers, I've spent so many months training with our stunt team, and fighting all the other actors, it's crazy. I do nothing but fight—all the time." Johansson earned $4–6 million for the film. In Captain America: The Winter Soldier, Screenwriter Christopher Markus said that Black Widow was a "great contrast" to Captain America, describing her as "incredibly modern, not very reverent, and just very straightforward whereas Steve is, you know a man from the 40s. He's not a boy scout, but he is reserved and has a moral center, whereas her moral center moves." The Russos added, "She's a character who lies for a living. That's what she does. He's a character who tells the truth. Give them a problem and they'll have different ways of approaching it. She's pushing him to modernize, and he's pushing her to add a certain level of integrity to her life." When asked about Romanoff's relationship with Rogers, Johansson responded,

"By a series of unfortunate encounters, they will be in a situation in which their friendship becomes more intimate. They share many similarities because they live on the defensive without relying on anyone. Also, the two have been working for the government throughout their professional careers. With their friendship they begin to question what they want and what is their true identity."

Producer Kevin Feige stated that more of the character's backstory is explored in Avengers: Age of Ultron. Johansson elaborated, "In Avengers 2 we go back... we definitely learn more about Widow's backstory, and we get to find out how she became the person you see. All of these characters have deep, dark pasts, and I think that the past catches up to some of us a little bit." Regarding where the film picks up Widow's story, Johansson felt it was a continuation of what was seen for her character in The Winter Soldier, with the fact that "'[Widow] never made an active choice. [She's] a product of other people's imposition.' That's going to catch up with her. That's bound to have a huge effect. There's got to be a result of that realization... You'll see her actively making some choices in her life, for better or worse." A mixture of close-ups, concealing costumes, stunt doubles and visual effects were used to help hide Johansson's pregnancy during filming.

Anthony Russo noted Romanoff's torn allegiances in Captain America: Civil War, saying "her head is with Tony's side of things, but her heart is with Cap in a lot of ways." Johansson added that Romanoff is "looking to strategize her position, putting herself in a place where she is able to let the powers that be fight it out" in order for her to "have a better perspective of what's really going on". Describing her character's situation after the events of Avengers: Age of Ultron, Johansson said, "I think that the Widow's past will always haunt her. She's trying to move forward, she's trying to pick up the pieces of her life". She also said that Romanoff is at a point in her life where she can make choices herself, without having others have a hand in the decision process. On the continuation of the relationship between Romanoff and Rogers from The Winter Soldier, Joe Russo said that they wanted to "test it" by having Romanoff point out to Rogers the mistakes the team have made and convince him "that it might not be as black and white as he sees it" and that the Avengers must "find a way to work within the system so that [they] aren't disbanded".

I never feel like my work is done... I still think of new ways I could try lines from movies I shot 10 years ago. I really am happy with the work I accomplished in my last decade-plus at Marvel. I feel like I'm going out on a high note with a movie I'm incredibly proud of. I feel like my work with Natasha is complete, if that is such a thing. I've explored many facets of her person, and feel that her choice to sacrifice her life for her best friends was one that she made actively and with resolve.

— Scarlett Johansson on finishing her role as Romanoff

By the events of Infinity War, Johansson said that Romanoff's situation following Captain America: Civil War has been "a dark time. I wouldn't say that my character has been particularly hopeful, but I think she's hardened even more than she probably was before". At the beginning of Avengers: Endgame, Romanoff continues to command several teams from around the galaxy in the Avengers headquarters, which Joe Russo explained resulted from her inability to move on from their failure to stop Thanos, saying, "she's doing everything she can to try and hold the community together...She's the watcher on the wall still." On the decision for Romanoff to sacrifice herself for Barton to acquire the Soul Stone to bring back everyone, Joe Russo stated that it was part of a larger theme exploring the desire to sacrifice, compared to the desire to protect in Infinity War; he says, "When she gets to that [Soul Stone] scene, I think she understands that the only way to bring the community back is for her to sacrifice herself." McFeely stated, "Her journey, in our minds, had come to an end if she could get the Avengers back. She comes from such an abusive, terrible, mind-control background, so when she gets to Vormir and she has a chance to get the family back, that's a thing she would trade for." To prepare for the film, Johansson underwent a high-intensity workout regimen, which included plyometrics, Olympic weightlifting and gymnastics, as well as a time-restricted eating diet; all are under the supervision of her longtime trainer, Eric Johnson, with whom she had worked since Iron Man 2 (2010), the film which introduced her character.

In 2018, Johansson described the then-forthcoming film Black Widow as "an opportunity to explore the Widow as a woman who has come into her own and is making independent and active choices for herself, probably for once in her life", while being in a "dark place where she's got no one to call and nowhere to go". While Romanoff remains a fugitive in the film, she finds herself alone and forced to confront a dangerous conspiracy with ties to her past involving the spymaster Dreykov, with the help of Romanoff's "family", Yelena Belova, Alexei Shostakov and Melinda Vostokoff. Johansson said that she was "going out on a high note with a movie [she was] incredibly proud of", and felt that her work portraying Romanoff was "complete" with the film. Ever Anderson portrays a young Natasha Romanoff.

Alternate versions of Romanoff are voiced by Lake Bell in What If...? (2021).

== Differences from the comics ==
Natasha Romanoff in the MCU is a member of the Avengers founded by Nick Fury since the start, while in the comics she is a much later addition, and initially a villain (named Romanova, rather than Romanoff) who is specifically antagonistic to the team. In fact, the first female Avenger in the original Avengers created by Stan Lee and Jack Kirby was the Wasp. The MCU version also showed a brief romance with Bruce Banner in Age of Ultron, also hinted at in later films. No such relationship occurs in the comic books, although the character is shown in the comic books involved with several other characters, including Clint Barton, Bucky Barnes and Hercules. In the films, her relationship with Barton is a close but platonic friendship. The character has also been involved with Matt Murdock in the comics, while the two have never had any interactions during the course of their appearances in the MCU.

== Fictional character biography ==
=== Early life ===
Natalia Alianovna Romanova (Russian: Наталья Альяновна Романова) was born on December 3, 1984, in the Soviet Union, and was trained as a KGB spy in a secretive academy called the Red Room which included training as a ballerina as a cover, as well as the eventual sterilization of the students. She grew up in a false family with Alexei Shostakov and Melina Vostokoff as her 'parents' and Yelena Belova as her younger 'sister'. In 1995, when Shostakov completes his assigned mission to steal intel from S.H.I.E.L.D. in Ohio, the family escape to Cuba where they rendezvous with their boss, General Dreykov, who has Romanoff and Belova put through the Red Room for further training to become assassins.

Eventually, Clint Barton is sent to kill Romanoff, but instead chooses to spare her life and recruit her to S.H.I.E.L.D., enabling Romanoff to defect from the USSR and escape her previous life. (Note: As mentioned by Barton in the fourth episode of Hawkeye (2021)) In Budapest, with Barton's help, Romanoff rigs a bomb in an attempt to kill Dreykov, seemingly killing his daughter Antonia in the process.

In 2009, Romanoff was sent on a mission to Odessa to protect a scientist, but was confronted by the Winter Soldier. Romanoff attempted to cover the scientist, but the Winter Soldier killed him by shooting him through Romanoff's stomach. (Note: As stated by Romanoff in Captain America: The Winter Soldier (2014))

=== Undercover for S.H.I.E.L.D. ===
In 2010, after Tony Stark publicly becomes Iron Man and appoints his personal assistant Pepper Potts as CEO of Stark Industries, he hires Romanoff, who is posing as Stark employee Natalie Rushman on behalf of Nick Fury, director of S.H.I.E.L.D., to replace Potts as his personal assistant. Fury later reveals this to Stark, and Romanoff then helps Stark to thwart the plans of villains Justin Hammer and Ivan Vanko, the latter of whom has remotely taken control of an army of military drones and the armor of Stark's friend James Rhodes. Romanoff successfully defeats Hammer's security forces to return control of the Rhodes' armor, allowing Stark and Rhodes to defeat Vanko and the drones.

=== Battle of New York ===
In 2012, Romanoff is being interrogated by Russian criminals when Agent Phil Coulson contacts her to inform her that Barton has been compromised. Romanoff promptly overcomes the Russians, whom she had only allowed to capture her in order to extract information. After Fury reactivates the "Avengers Initiative", she goes to Kolkata and recruits Bruce Banner to use his expertise to track the gamma signature of the Tesseract. She is introduced to Steve Rogers by Coulson and pilots a Quinjet to Stuttgart where Stark and Rogers have a confrontation with Loki who surrenders. While Loki is held prisoner on a S.H.I.E.L.D. helicarrier, Romanoff manipulates him into revealing his plan to cause Banner to become the Hulk. Barton and Loki's other possessed agents attack the Helicarrier and Banner transforms and chases Romanoff until he is stopped by Thor. Romanoff fights Barton and knocks him unconscious, breaking Loki's mind control. Rogers, Stark, Romanoff, Barton, Thor, and Hulk assemble as the Avengers in defense of Loki's next target, New York City. There they fight against the alien race called the Chitauri and ultimately defeat Loki. Afterwards, she and Barton leave together.

=== Dismantling Hydra ===
In 2014, Romanoff and Rogers are sent with S.H.I.E.L.D.'s counter-terrorism S.T.R.I.K.E. team to free hostages aboard a S.H.I.E.L.D. vessel from Georges Batroc and his mercenaries. Mid-mission, Rogers discovers Romanoff has another agenda: to extract data from the ship's computers for Fury. After an attempt on Fury's life, Rogers becomes a fugitive hunted by S.T.R.I.K.E., and meets with Romanoff. Using data in the flash drive, they discover a secret S.H.I.E.L.D. bunker in New Jersey, where they activate a supercomputer containing the preserved consciousness of Arnim Zola. Zola reveals that ever since S.H.I.E.L.D. was founded after World War II, Hydra has secretly operated within its ranks, sowing global chaos with the objective of making humanity surrender its freedom in exchange for security. The pair narrowly escape death when a S.H.I.E.L.D. missile destroys the bunker, and realize that Secretary of Internal Security Alexander Pierce is Hydra's leader within S.H.I.E.L.D. They take shelter with Rogers' new friend Sam Wilson, who joins them to stop Hydra. They are attacked by the Winter Soldier and Romanoff is shot through the shoulder but survives. Later, to prevent Hydra from using three Helicarriers to murder millions, Romanoff, disguised as a World Security Council member, disarms Pierce. Fury arrives and forces Pierce to unlock S.H.I.E.L.D.'s database so that Romanoff can leak classified information, exposing Hydra to the public. Romanoff later appears before a U.S. Senate subcommittee to defend her and Rogers' actions. Soon after, Romanoff recovers a Hydra file on the Winter Soldier (who is revealed to be Bucky Barnes) and gives it to Rogers and Wilson before leaving.

=== Ultron and the Sokovia Accords ===
In 2015, Romanoff and the other Avengers attack a Hydra facility in Sokovia where they recover Loki's scepter and encounter Wanda Maximoff and her twin brother Pietro. At the Avengers Tower, Romanoff attends the celebratory party and witnesses Ultron's first attack. She and the team go to Johannesburg to stop Ultron, but Maximoff subdues Romanoff, causing her to see visions of her time at the Red Room. Afterwards, she and the others find refuge at Barton's home, where she is greeted by his children who call her "Aunty Nat". She and Banner discuss their romantic feelings toward one another and consider going into hiding together. She, Rogers, and Barton travel to Seoul to stop Ultron from transferring his network into a vibranium body powered by the Mind Stone. They succeed but she is taken hostage by Ultron and held in Sokovia. Barton communicates with her using morse code and she is later rescued by Banner, who attempts to get Romanoff to leave with him. Romanoff kisses him, but decides that they should stay and pushes him off a ledge to trigger a transformation into the Hulk. She rallies with the other Avengers and Vision in the battle against Ultron. Following their victory, she and Rogers form a new team in upstate New York at the Avengers Compound consisting of Wilson, Rhodes, Maximoff, and Vision.

In 2016, she joins Rogers, Wilson, and Maximoff on a mission in Lagos to stop the mercenary Brock Rumlow from obtaining a bioweapon. Romanoff succeeds in securing it, but Maximoff mistakenly kills Wakandan humanitarian workers while protecting Rogers from Rumlow's suicide bomb, triggering the passage of the Sokovia Accords, giving the United Nations command of the Avengers. She comforts Rogers after Peggy Carter's funeral and is present in Vienna where the accords were to be ratified and survives the bombing that kills Wakandan King T'Chaka, T'Challa's father. She initially sides with Stark who supports the accords, accompanying him with Rhodes, Vision, T'Challa and Peter Parker to subdue Rogers's team consisting of Barnes, Barton, Wilson, Maximoff, and Scott Lang at Leipzig/Halle Airport in Germany. While there, she changes her mind and allows Rogers and Barnes to escape. T'Challa reports her betrayal to U.S. Secretary of State Thaddeus Ross, which puts her at odds with Stark and forces her to go into hiding.

=== Confronting her past ===
As a fugitive from the United Nations, Romanoff escapes from Ross and flees to a safehouse in Norway where she reunites with her contact Rick Mason. Yelena Belova sends a mind control antidote to Romanoff's safehouse in the hopes that Romanoff will return to help her. As Romanoff unknowingly drives off with the antidote, she is attacked by Taskmaster. Romanoff evades Taskmaster and learns that the antidote came from Belova. They reunite in Budapest, but are then attacked by various Widows. Romanoff learns that General Dreykov is still alive, and that the Red Room is still active.

Romanoff and Belova break Alexei Shostakov out of prison, and connect with Melina Vostokoff, before being captured and returned to the Red Room. As Dreykov congratulates Vostokoff on finding them, it is revealed that Vostokoff and Romanoff used face masking technology to plan their own capture and switch places. Romanoff learns that Taskmaster is Antonia Dreykov, who suffered damage so severe that Dreykov was forced to put a chip in her head to save her while also turning her into a mind-controlled soldier. Romanoff also discovers that she cannot harm Dreykov due to a pheromone lock he installed in every Widow, and that he has been controlling Widows all around the world via his control desk. Romanoff intentionally breaks her own nose, which severs a nerve in her nasal passage to negate the pheromone, allowing her to attack Dreykov.

Dreykov escapes as the Widows go after Romanoff, but Belova creates an antidote bomb that releases the Widows from mind control. Romanoff accesses the control desk and copies the locations of the other Widows worldwide to a portable drive just as the facility begins to explode and fall from the sky. Before leaving the control room, she picks up two vials of the antidote that survived Belova's bomb. Romanoff gives Belova a parachute as she and Antonia have one final battle through the sky. Landing on the ground, Romanoff uses one vial of the antidote on Antonia, freeing her from servitude. The rest of the Widows arrive as Belova, Vostokoff, and Shostakov say goodbye to Romanoff and she gives Belova the last antidote vial and the portable drive, telling her to find and free the other Widows. As they leave, Romanoff awaits the arrival of Ross and his men. Two weeks later, Romanoff reunites with Mason who has supplied her with a Quinjet. She departs to meet with her fugitive teammates.

=== Infinity War ===
In 2018, Romanoff, Rogers, and Wilson arrive in Edinburgh to defend Maximoff and Vision from Corvus Glaive and Proxima Midnight, two of Thanos' adopted children. Romanoff wounds Glaive with his own weapon when she stabs him in the abdomen and both he and Midnight retreat. Romanoff chastises Maximoff for not frequently checking in and they return to the Compound, reuniting with Rhodes and Banner. After discussing Vision and the Mind Stone, they travel to Wakanda in hopes the Stone can be removed safely by Shuri. Romanoff joins in the battle against the Outriders and witnesses Thor, Rocket Raccoon, and Groot's arrival. She and Okoye are saved from Threshers by Maximoff, before teaming up to defend Maximoff from Midnight. After the battle is over, she witnesses Thanos arrive, but is incapacitated by his usage of the Reality Stone. She survives the Blip and is left defeated.

She, Banner, Rogers, Rhodes, Thor, and Rocket return to the Compound and shortly after, meet Carol Danvers. (Note: As depicted in the mid-credit scene of Captain Marvel (2019)) Later, she and the others witness Danvers return with the Benatar, bringing Stark and Nebula to the Compound. Romanoff then gives a briefing on the Blip, before learning Thanos' location from Nebula. She, Rocket, Danvers, Nebula, Rogers, Thor, Banner, and Rhodes then travel into space via the Benatar to find him. They go to the Garden planet where they learn Thanos destroyed the stones, much to their dismay, and Thor decapitates him. (Note: As depicted in Avengers: Endgame (2019))

=== Time Heist and death ===
In 2023, Romanoff, who is living at the Avengers Compound, leads the Avengers, now including Rocket, Nebula, and Danvers. She tells Rhodes to keep looking for Barton, who lost his family in the Blip and spent the last few years killing members of organized crime across the world. She and Rogers are astonished when Lang, whom they believed had disappeared, arrives at the Compound and tells them that he has been trapped in the Quantum Realm, a place where time passes differently. Romanoff, Rogers, and Lang present the idea of using the Realm to obtain the Stones from the past to Stark at his cabin, but he refuses to help. They meet Banner at a diner, who has permanently assumed the Hulk form, and he agrees to help them. However, they fail to send Lang back in time successfully using the portable Quantum Tunnel in Lang's borrowed van at the Compound.

Romanoff travels in the Quinjet to Tokyo where she reunites with Barton, after witnessing him murder the Yakuza leader. She convinces him to return to the Compound. After Rocket, Nebula, and Thor arrive, Romanoff checks on Barton after he does a test run of Stark and Rocket's newly built Quantum Tunnel and learns that he was successful in returning to his house in another timeline. Romanoff and the team brainstorm a plan to obtain all six Infinity Stones from alternate timelines. She, Barton, Rhodes, and Nebula travel the Realm to an alternate 2014 timeline and arrive on the planet Morag, before she and Barton leave in the Benatar for the planet Vormir. They encounter the Red Skull who reveals a life sacrifice is needed to obtain the Soul Stone. Romanoff tries to stop Barton from sacrificing himself, ultimately subduing him, and falling to her death.

=== Legacy ===
Banner, Barton, Rogers, Stark, and Thor grieve Romanoff's death privately outside the Compound. Her sacrifice is not in vain however, as Banner successfully undoes the Blip, restoring half of all life in the universe. Barton and Maximoff discuss Romanoff's sacrifice and his desire to let her know they won, while Banner later admits to Rogers and Bucky Barnes that he tried to use the stones to bring her back.

In 2024, students at Parker's school, Midtown School of Science and Technology, make a tribute video respecting those who had fallen, including Romanoff.

In December 2024, Belova visits Romanoff's grave in Ohio to pay her respects, before being assigned by Valentina Allegra de Fontaine to assassinate Barton, whom de Fontaine deems responsible for Romanoff's death. Also in December 2024, Barton visits New York City with his family for Christmas and attends a Broadway theatre performance of Rogers: The Musical, which depicts Romanoff during the 2012 Battle of New York. Barton suffers flashbacks of Romanoff's death. As Barton opens up to Kate Bishop about Romanoff, she deduces that he is Ronin. Belova arrives and tries to kill Barton, but is stopped by Bishop. She later confronts Bishop and informs her that she intends to kill Barton to avenge her sister's death. Barton visits a memorial to the assembling of the Avengers where he verbalizes aloud that he misses her. When Belova confronts Barton, they fight, but Barton successfully explains that Romanoff sacrificed herself to save the world and explains his close relationship with her. An emotional Belova spares Barton's life and leaves.

In 2025, Romanoff is honored with murals for her sacrifice at the first annual AvengerCon in Camp Lehigh, New Jersey. She is also mentioned by Bruce Banner when he is helping his cousin, Jennifer Walters, adjust to her new powers as She-Hulk.

In 2027, Belova, still mourning the loss of her sister, is encouraged by Shostakov to follow in Romanoff's footsteps and subsequently becomes an Avenger after saving New York City from the Void and de Fontaine.

== Alternate versions ==
Other versions of Romanoff are depicted in the alternate realities of the MCU multiverse.

=== 2012 variant ===
In an alternate 2012, Romanoff and the Avengers fight off the Chitauri army in the Battle of New York. After defeating Loki at Stark Tower, she and Barton give Loki's scepter to Rumlow and other agents.

=== What If...? (2021–2024) ===
Several alternate versions of Romanoff appear in the animated series What If...?, in which she is voiced by Lake Bell.

- In an alternate 2010, Romanoff is framed for Stark's death after she injects a serum that was meant to alleviate his palladium poisoning. After escaping Rumlow and the other S.H.I.E.L.D. agents, Romanoff visits Betty Ross at Culver University to investigate the cause of Stark's death, where she witnesses an attack on Banner by military forces led by Ross. Romanoff continues her investigation following Banner's death and deduces that Hank Pym was behind the murders – Pym seeking revenge on S.H.I.E.L.D. as he blames them for the death of his daughter Hope – before being killed by him.
- In an alternate 2018, Romanoff becomes infected by a quantum virus when the Avengers respond to the virus' outbreak, turning into a zombie.
- In an alternate 2015, Romanoff and Barton are the only survivors of Ultron's eradication of Earth. They travel to Moscow in an attempt to find an analog code to shut down Ultron's AI system. Finding a file on Arnim Zola, they go to the Hydra Siberian facility and attempt to upload Zola's copied consciousness into Ultron's hive mind and eliminate him. Barton sacrifices himself after being overwhelmed by Ultron's sentries, and the upload fails when Zola reveals that Ultron was no longer in their universe. Sometime later, Romanoff encounters the Guardians of the Multiverse, who had been recruited by the Watcher to stop Ultron by forcing him back to his universe. Ultron arrives with the Infinity Stones and fight the team, with Romanoff and Carter successfully uploading Zola's analog consciousness into Ultron's body. However, Killmonger then betrays them and fights with Zola over the Stones, but Doctor Strange Supreme intervenes and traps them both in a pocket dimension, freezing them in time in a moment where neither can use the Stones. In the aftermath of the battle, Romanoff refuses to return to her home reality, leading the Watcher to relocate her to a universe where her counterpart was killed by Pym. Arriving on a Helicarrier where Fury, Rogers, and Danvers are fighting Loki and his Asgardian army, she seizes Loki's scepter and subdues him before being greeted by Fury.
- In an alternate universe where Captain Carter took the super-soldier serum during World War II, Romanoff killed Dreykov and later joined Carter as a founding member of the Avengers, alongside Iron Man, Thor, Wasp and Hawkeye. In 2014, Romanoff and Carter assist S.H.I.E.L.D. in capturing a group of pirates led by Batroc, who have taken over the Lemurian Star. Romanoff discovers that the pirates targeted the vessel because Steve Rogers' Hydra Stomper armor is on board. After subduing Batroc, Romanoff shows the armor to Carter and informs her that Rogers is inside. However, when the Stomper reactivates, Rogers unexpectedly attacks both women before escaping. Back at the Triskellion, Carter berates Romanoff and Fury for not telling her that Rogers may have been alive and brainwashed by the Russian-led Red Room, sometime after he was reportedly killed in action. After Rogers returns and attempts to assassinate secretary Bucky Barnes, Romanoff helps him and Carter escape to Scotland, where they seemingly free Rogers of his brainwashing. He leads the two to the Red Room in hopes of finding a cure. However, Melina Vostokoff, the new leader of the Red Room, reactivates Rogers' brainwashing and engages Romanoff in battle alongside several of the Widows. Romanoff subdues the Widows and uses a grappling hook to attach Vostokoff to the Hydra Stomper armor. Breaking free of the brainwashing with Carter's help, Rogers seemingly sacrifices himself to destroy the Red Room. Sometime later, Romanoff agrees to help Carter try to find and save Rogers, only to have Carter suddenly be pulled into a portal.
- In an alternate 2014, Romanoff participates in a Christmas ballet before spotting a former HYDRA agent. As she is dealing with the agent, she gets a call from Hogan. Later, she regroups with Stark, Rogers, Barton, and Banner, and they return to Avengers Tower and attack the Freak. Darcy Lewis intervenes telling them that he is Hogan, and that Hammer was the one behind the attack on the Tower. Romanoff and the others then attend their annual Christmas party.
- In an alternate 2014, after Bruce Banner attempts to cure himself from his Hulk condition by bombarding himself with gamma radiation and accidentally creates the "Apex Hulk", Romanoff and her fellow Avengers battle the Apex and its army with ginormous mechs, but are outnumbered and killed.

== Reception ==
=== Critical response ===
In the character's first appearance in the MCU, David Edelstein of New York Magazine crudely described the presence of the female leads in Iron Man 2 as "a gam-off between Gwyneth Paltrow and Scarlett Johansson in which Paltrow wins on length and then disappears in the glare of her opponent's headlights". Vanity Fair notes that her entrance in that film "famously chose to focus on her desirability rather than her staggering combat skills".

A Daily Beast review of the character's role in Age of Ultron lamented that the character had been made to "function as a cog that services the storylines" of the male characters. Vanity Fair described the development of the character across the films as "a trajectory that's been as all over the map as Black Widow's varying hairstyles", stating that she "spent her years in the MCU as an accessory to narratives foregrounding other heroes".

Vox notes that in Avengers: Endgame, "Johansson takes Romanoff — usually the dependable, no-frills assassin — into quiet, stoic suffering", while Vanity Fair laments that the film "never gives her or her death room to breathe".

Romanoff's final film appearance in the MCU garnered mixed reviews. David Rooney, writing for The Hollywood Reporter, called Black Widow "a stellar vehicle" for Johansson. Eric Kohn of IndieWire praised the action, "notably during a brawl between Black Widow and the robotic killer known as Taskmaster who mirrors her every move. If this is the last time we get to see Johansson mete out justice to her assailants with gymnastic velocity, it's an apt send-off."

Writing for BBC Culture, Caryn James felt that Romanoff was "the least interesting character" in her family, being "an odd fit for the sly family movie unfolding around her"." However, Pete Hammond of Deadline Hollywood wrote that Johansson "goes out with all guns blazing", and felt that the opening sequence revealing Romanoff's family construct are actually Russian spies was reminiscent of The Americans, while praising the chemistry between Johansson and Florence Pugh, "with Natasha's awkward shyness counterpunched by the lively and cynical Yelena". Of the performances, Hammond said: "Johansson is again a great presence in the role, showing expert action and acting chops throughout".

=== Accolades ===
Year	Film	Award	Category	Result	Ref(s)
2010	Iron Man 2	Teen Choice Awards	Choice Movie Actress: Sci-Fi/Fantasy	Nominated	
2010	Iron Man 2	Scream Awards	Best Science Fiction Actress	Won	
2011	Iron Man 2	Saturn Awards	Best Supporting Actress	Nominated	
2012	The Avengers	Teen Choice Awards	Choice Movie Actress: Sci-Fi/Fantasy	Won	
2012	The Avengers	Teen Choice Awards	Choice Summer Movie Star: Female	Won	
2013	The Avengers	Kids' Choice Awards	Favorite Movie Actress	Won	
2013	The Avengers	Kids' Choice Awards	Favorite Butt-Kicker	Won	
2013	The Avengers	People's Choice Awards	Favorite Movie Actress	Nominated	
2013	The Avengers	People's Choice Awards	Favorite Face of Heroism	Won	
2013	The Avengers	People's Choice Awards	Favorite On-Screen Chemistry (with Jeremy Renner)	Won	
2013	The Avengers	MTV Movie Awards	Best Fight (with cast)	Won	
2014	Captain America: The Winter Soldier	Teen Choice Awards	Choice Movie Actress: Sci-Fi/Fantasy	Won	
2014	Captain America: The Winter Soldier	Teen Choice Awards	Choice Movie: Liplock (with Chris Evans)	Nominated	
2015	Captain America: The Winter Soldier	People's Choice Awards	Favorite Movie Actress	Won	
2015	Captain America: The Winter Soldier	People's Choice Awards	Favorite Movie Duo (with Chris Evans)	Won	
2015	Captain America: The Winter Soldier	People's Choice Awards	Favorite Action Movie Actress	Nominated	
2015	Captain America: The Winter Soldier	Kids' Choice Awards	Favorite Female Action Star	Nominated	
2015	Captain America: The Winter Soldier	Saturn Awards	Saturn Award for Best Supporting Actress	Won	
2015	Captain America: The Winter Soldier	MTV Movie Awards	Best Kiss (with Chris Evans)	Nominated	
2015	Avengers: Age of Ultron	Teen Choice Awards	Choice Movie Actress: Sci-Fi/Fantasy	Won	
2016	Avengers: Age of Ultron	People's Choice Awards	Favorite Movie Actress	Won	
2016	Avengers: Age of Ultron	People's Choice Awards	Favorite Action Movie Actress	Nominated	
2016	Avengers: Age of Ultron	Kids' Choice Awards	Favorite Movie Actress	Won	
2016	Captain America: Civil War	Teen Choice Awards	Choice Movie Actress: Sci-Fi/Fantasy	Nominated	
2016	Captain America: Civil War	Teen Choice Awards	Choice Movie: Chemistry (with cast)	Won	
2016	Captain America: Civil War	Critics' Choice Awards	Best Actress in an Action Movie	Won	
2017	Captain America: Civil War	People's Choice Awards	Favorite Movie Actress	Nominated	
2017	Captain America: Civil War	People's Choice Awards	Favorite Action Movie Actress	Nominated	
2017	Captain America: Civil War	Kids' Choice Awards	Favorite Movie Actress	Won	
2017	Captain America: Civil War	Kids' Choice Awards	Favorite Butt-Kicker	Won	
2017	Captain America: Civil War	Kids' Choice Awards	#Squad (with cast)	Won	
2017	Captain America: Civil War	Saturn Awards	Best Supporting Actress	Nominated	
2018	Avengers: Infinity War	MTV Movie & TV Awards	Best Fight (with cast)	Won	
2018	Avengers: Infinity War	Teen Choice Awards	Choice Action Movie Actress	Won	
2018	Avengers: Infinity War	People's Choice Awards	Female Movie Star of 2018	Won	
2019	Avengers: Infinity War	Kids' Choice Awards	Favorite Movie Actress	Won	
2019	Avengers: Infinity War	Kids' Choice Awards	Favorite Superhero	Won	
2019	Avengers: Endgame	Teen Choice Awards	Choice Action Movie Actress	Won	
2019	Avengers: Endgame	Saturn Awards	Best Supporting Actress	Nominated	
2019	Avengers: Endgame	People's Choice Awards	Female Movie Star of 2019	Nominated	
2021	Black Widow	Women's Image Network Awards	Outstanding Actress in a Feature Film	Won	
2021	Black Widow	People's Choice Awards	Female Movie Star of 2021	Won	
2021	Black Widow	People's Choice Awards	Action Movie Star of 2021	Nominated	
2022	Black Widow	Critics' Choice Super Awards	Best Actress in a Superhero Movie	Won	
2022	Black Widow	Nickelodeon Kids' Choice Awards	Favorite Movie Actress	Won	
2022	Black Widow	MTV Movie & TV Awards	Best Hero	Won	
2022	Black Widow	MTV Movie & TV Awards	Best Fight	Won	

== See also ==
- Black Widow (Marvel Comics)
- Characters of the Marvel Cinematic Universe
