= Peter Pan & Wendy (film) =

2023 film by David Lowery

- Promotional release poster
- Directed by: David Lowery
- Screenplay by: David Lowery; Toby Halbrooks
- Based on: Peter Pan and Wendy (Note: The novel was preceded by the 1904 play Peter Pan; or, the Boy Who Wouldn't Grow Up) by J. M. Barrie; Walt Disney's Peter Pan
- Produced by: Jim Whitaker
- Starring: Jude Law; Alexander Molony; Ever Anderson; Yara Shahidi; Alyssa Wapanatâhk; Joshua Pickering; Jacobi Jupe; Jim Gaffigan
- Cinematography: Bojan Bazelli
- Edited by: Lisa Zeno Churgin
- Music by: Daniel Hart
- Production companies: Walt Disney Pictures; Whitaker Entertainment; Roth/Kirschenbaum Films
- Distributed by: Disney+
- Release date: April 28, 2023
- Running time: 109 minutes
- Country: United States
- Language: English
- Budget: $170 million

Peter Pan & Wendy is a 2023 American fantasy adventure film based on the 1911 novel Peter and Wendy by J. M. Barrie, and serves as a live action adaptation of Walt Disney's 1953 film Peter Pan. Produced by Walt Disney Pictures and Whitaker Entertainment, the film was directed by David Lowery from a screenplay he co-wrote with Toby Halbrooks. Alexander Molony and Ever Anderson star in the title roles, Peter Pan and Wendy Darling respectively. Jude Law, Yara Shahidi, Alyssa Wapanatâhk, Joshua Pickering, Jacobi Jupe and Jim Gaffigan also appear in supporting roles. The story follows Peter Pan and Wendy, who go to the magical world of Neverland with Wendy's brothers and Peter's best friend Tinker Bell. Along the way, Wendy embarks on the adventure that will change her life and encounters Peter's archenemy Captain Hook.

Development on a live-action Peter Pan film began on April 13, 2016, with Lowery directing. Lowery was announced as writing the film with Halbrooks, while the production team expanded the next four years due to work in the remake's script. The film's title was announced on January 7, 2020. Production was expected to begin in April 2020 and wrap in August that year but was delayed due to the COVID-19 pandemic. Filming ultimately began in March 2021 in Vancouver, British Columbia. Shooting also occurred on the Bonavista Peninsula of Newfoundland and Labrador, in August 2021, and in the Faroe Islands as well as the Cliffs of Moher in Ireland.

Peter Pan & Wendy premiered on Disney+ on April 28, 2023. The film received mixed reviews from critics.

== Plot ==
In Edwardian London, Wendy Darling spends her last night at home with her parents and her two younger brothers, John and Michael, before leaving for boarding school the next day. She is unhappy with her departure and feels she does not want to grow up. Having heard Wendy's wish, a free-spirited boy named Peter Pan arrives to take her to Neverland where she will never have to grow up. With the help of his companion, fairy Tinker Bell, Wendy, John, and Michael fly to Neverland.

Upon arriving, they are attacked by a ship of pirates, led by Captain Hook, who wants revenge on Peter for cutting off his right hand and throwing it to a crocodile. Wendy becomes separated from Peter and her brothers and meets Tiger Lily and the Eight Lost Children (four boys & four girls). She witnesses the pirates capturing John and Michael to drown them at Skull Rock. Peter fights Hook, while Wendy, Tiger Lily, and the Lost Children save John and Michael. Hook and the pirates are chased away by the crocodile. Peter is proud of his victory, but is scolded by Wendy for his recklessness, and the Lost Children tell her that he has a complicated history with Hook.

Retreating to Peter's hideout, Wendy sings a lullaby to the Lost Children, which accidentally reveals their location to the pirates. Wendy learns from Peter that Hook was once "the very first Lost Boy" and his best friend James, until he left Neverland and grew up to be a pirate. Hook's crew captures the Lost Children, Tinker Bell and the Darling children, while Hook ambushes Peter, who seemingly falls to his death. Instead of feeling joy, however, Hook feels empty and unsatisfied. He reveals to Wendy that the reason he left Neverland was because he missed his mother and wanted to find her. Eventually, he got lost at sea and was rescued by his first mate, Mr. Smee, and the pirates who raised him. When he returned to Neverland, Peter could not accept how much he had changed, and the two became arch-enemies.

While Tiger Lily finds and nurses Peter back to health, Hook forces Wendy to walk the plank, but she flies away with Tinker Bell's pixie dust and the happy thought of wanting to grow up. Tinker Bell flies the ship into the air with pixie dust, helping the Lost Children break free and battle the pirates. Peter arrives to confront Hook, and after a long duel, finally apologizes to him for being a bad friend, but Hook does not want their rivalry to end. When Wendy turns the ship on its back, causing the pirates to fall down into the sea, Peter attempts to save Hook, encouraging him to fly, but without happy thoughts, he falls into the sea while losing his hook. Afterward, the Lost Children decide they all want a real home, so they fly back to London on the ship with the Darlings.

Arriving home, Wendy introduces the Lost Children to her parents. Peter reveals the Darlings' house was his old home until one day he ran away after an argument with his mother, and never came back. Wendy suggests he stay, but Peter feels he is not ready to grow up. He bids farewell to Wendy and the Lost Children, and returns to Neverland with Tinker Bell.

Back in Neverland, Hook and Smee are revealed to have survived the fall. As they hang on to floating debris in the sea, Hook sees Peter returning on the ship and smiles civilly.

== Cast ==
- Alexander Molony as Peter Pan
- Ever Anderson as Wendy Darling
- Jude Law as Captain Hook
- Yara Shahidi as Tinker Bell
- Alyssa Wapanatâhk as Tiger Lily
- Joshua Pickering as John Darling, Wendy's younger brother
- Jacobi Jupe as Michael Darling, Wendy's younger brother
- Jim Gaffigan as Mr. Smee
- Molly Parker as Mary Darling, Wendy's mother
- Alan Tudyk as George Darling, Wendy's father
- Noah Matthews Matofsky as Slightly, Wendy's adoptive younger brother
- Caelan Edie as Tootles, Wendy's adoptive younger brother
- Felix de Sousa as Bellweather, Wendy's adoptive younger brother
- Florence Bensberg as Curly, Wendy's adoptive younger sister
- Kelsey Yates as Tudy, Wendy's adoptive younger sister and Rudy's identical twin sister
- Skyler Yates as Rudy, Wendy's adoptive younger sister and Tudy's identical twin sister
- Diana Tsoy as Birdie, Wendy's adoptive younger sister
- Sebastian Billingsley-Rodriguez as Nibs, Wendy's adoptive younger brother
- John DeSantis as Bill Jukes
- Garfield Wilson as Gurley
- Ian Tracey as Sallyport
- Mark Acheson as Old Clemson
- Jesse James Pierce as Skylight
- Cassie Van Wolde as adult Wendy
- Deborah Ramsey as older Wendy

== Production ==
=== Development and pre-production ===
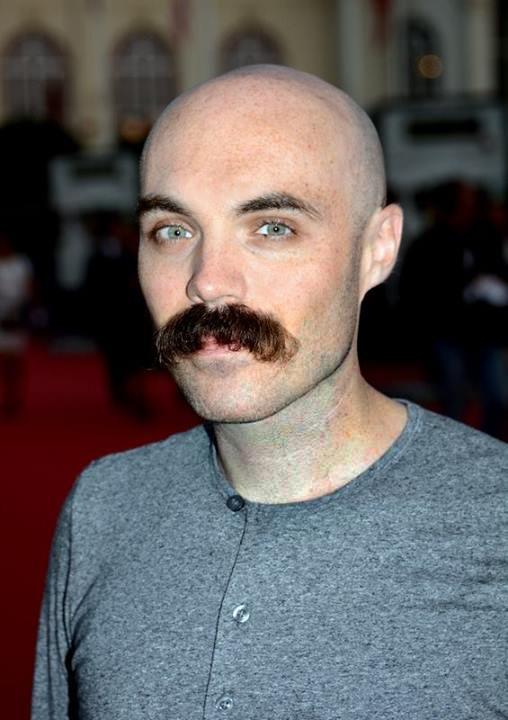
The film was a passion project for its director and co-writer David Lowery.

In April 2016, it was announced that Walt Disney Pictures was developing a live-action adaptation of the 1953 animated film Peter Pan. David Lowery signed on as director, with a script he co-wrote with Toby Halbrooks. The pair previously worked together on the 2016 remake of Disney's Pete's Dragon. Jim Whitaker served as producer on the project.

In February 2018, Whitaker stated that the script was entering early stages of development. He further explained that the film would be grounded in realism, though it would also be "a big, rollicking adventure, too." By October of the same year, the fourth draft of the script had been completed with a fifth draft underway. Lowery stated that "the number-one priority is getting the script right". The filmmaker elaborated that the project was personal to him, as he is a fan to the original, acknowledging that he had been "agonizing over every little detail". He confirmed that the modern-day adaptation would have to change elements to avoid the racial stereotypes present in the original film.

In December 2019, Lowery stated that he and Halbrooks had written an additional "draft-and-a-half" at that point, adding that it would have to have "a few more drafts to go" before it was ready to be filmed. He described working on the film as "challenging" due to both his personal love for the original film and its popularity among fans. He also felt that he had to justify the film's existence due to other live-action Peter Pan films having been developed, while also doing "justice to the source material". The filmmaker stated that the outlook that he and the studio had, was: "[i]f it has to be done, it has to be done right". Comparing his work on Peter Pan to Pete's Dragon, the filmmaker stated that the latter was less stressful seeing as the original had been an "under-the-radar Disney title" with little following, which allowed him more creative freedom. By 2020, the film was officially titled Peter Pan & Wendy. Joe Roth joined the film's production team as an additional producer.

=== Casting ===
Alexander Molony and Ever Anderson were reported to have been cast as Peter Pan and Wendy Darling, respectively, in March 2020. By July of the same year, Jude Law had entered early negotiations to play Captain James Hook. Law would be confirmed in September, with Yara Shahidi cast to play Tinker Bell. In October 2020, Alyssa Wapanatâhk was confirmed to play Tiger Lily. In January 2021, Jim Gaffigan joined the cast as Mr. Smee. On March 16, 2021, Alan Tudyk, Molly Parker, Joshua Pickering and Jacobi Jupe were announced to play Mr. Darling, Mrs. Darling, John Darling and Michael Darling, respectively, as principal photography officially began.

=== Filming ===
Production for Peter Pan & Wendy took place in Vancouver, British Columbia. It was originally set to begin on April 17, 2020, and wrap in August 2020, but filming was delayed due to the COVID-19 pandemic. Filming began on March 16, 2021. Additional filming took place on the Bonavista Peninsula of Newfoundland and Labrador, in August 2021. Scenes were also filmed in the Faroe Islands. Reshoots took place in Vancouver, from February 2 to 8, 2022. The Cliffs of Moher in Ireland were an additional location used for Neverland.

=== Visual effects ===
The visual effects were handled by Framestore and DNEG.

== Release ==
The film was originally set to be released on Disney's streaming service, Disney+, but was later rumoured to be released theatrically. In December 2020, the film was officially announced to be released as a Disney+ exclusive again due to the COVID-19 pandemic. The film was released on Disney+ on April 28, 2023.

== Reception ==
=== Viewership ===
Whip Media, which tracks viewership data for the more than 25 million worldwide users of its TV Time app, revealed that Peter Pan & Wendy was in the top five of the most-streamed films in the U.S. from April 30 to May 5. The streaming aggregator Reelgood, which tracks real-time data from 20 million U.S. users for original and acquired content across SVOD and AVOD services, reported that the film was among the ten most-streamed programs in the U.S. from April 27 to May 4. JustWatch, a guide to streaming content with access to data from more than 20 million users around the world, announced that Peter Pan & Wendy ranked among the top ten most-streamed films during the week of May 7.

Analytics company Samba TV, which gathers viewership data from certain smart TVs and content providers, reported that Peter Pan & Wendy was the second most-streamed program in the U.S. from April 26 to May 2. The film was watched by 762,000 U.S. households during the first two days following its release. It particularly resonated with Gen Z and older millennial viewers, both of whom over-indexed in viewership compared to the national average. Nielsen Media Research, which records streaming viewership on U.S. television screens, calculated that the film garnered 477 million minutes of watch time from April 24 to April 30, ranking as the second most-streamed film during that week. In the following week, from May 1–7, the film recorded 245 million minutes of watch time, making it the sixth most-streamed film that week.

=== Critical response ===
On the review aggregator website Rotten Tomatoes, 65% of 149 critics' reviews are positive, with an average rating of 6.2/10. The website's consensus reads: "Peter Pan & Wendy's obligatory fidelity to the animated classic keeps it from achieving Neverland nirvana, but David Lowery's pensive direction gives this rendition some of its own magic." Metacritic, which uses a weighted average, assigned the film a score of 61 out of 100, based on 33 critics, indicating "generally favorable" reviews.

Matt Zoller Seitz of RogerEbert.com, gave the film two and a half stars out of four, writing: "Peter Pan & Wendy ultimately settles for 'everybody misses their mother', a sentiment that's true for most people, but is a slim reed to hang such a big film on, especially one with other problems." Benjamin Lee of The Guardian, gave the film three stars out of five, saying: "Jude Law's full-throated performance as Captain Hook is the most distinctive thing in a passable but unnecessary Disney live-action remake." Ben Travis of Empire also gave the film three stars out of five, and wrote: "David Lowery’s second Disney reimagining is artfully constructed and full of interesting ideas. But for a film about the energy and imagination of youth, it often feels trapped in its own head."

Robbie Collin of The Telegraph gave the film five stars out of five, and said: "David Lowery's take on JM Barrie's classic is top-to-bottom wonderful – and the perfect antidote to the recent, dire Super Mario Bros. film." Peter Debruge of Variety gave the film a negative review, writing: "Even if he could grow up, J.M. Barrie's age-defying scamp must feel like he's trapped in a time loop, so often has he been revived. This straight-to-streaming take ranks among the least imaginative." Tara Bennett of IGN gave the film a six out of ten, and wrote: "A handsome remake that forgot to have fun."

=== Accolades ===
Year	Award	Category	Nominee(s)	Result	Ref
2023	Golden Trailer Awards	Best Motion Poster	Peter Pan & Wendy	Won	
2024	International Film Music Critics Awards	Best Original Score for a Fantasy/Science Fiction Film	Daniel Hart	Nominated	
2024	Leo Awards	Best Make-Up in a Television Movie	Naomi Bakstad, Megan Harkness, Krista Seller, Bill Terezakis	Nominated	
2024	Leo Awards	Best Stunt Coordination in a Motion Picture or Dramatic Series	Eli Zagoudakis	Nominated	
2024	Taurus World Stunt Awards	Best Stunt Rigging	Dar Hicks, Perry Beckham, Jason Kruk, Corbin Fox, Luke Cormier	Won	
2024	Visual Effects Society Awards	Outstanding Model in a Photoreal or Animated Project	Peter Pan & Wendy	Nominated	

== See also ==
- List of works based on Peter Pan
- List of remakes and adaptations of Disney animated films
- Peter Pan & Wendy (soundtrack)
