= How We Stand =

2026 Canadian drama film

- Directed by: Marie Clements
- Written by: Marie Clements
- Produced by: Marie Clements; Trish Dolman; Christine Haebler; Steven Thibault
- Starring: Amber Midthunder; Cara Jade Myers; Alyssa Wapanatâhk
- Cinematography: Adam Madrzyk
- Edited by: Maxime Lahaie
- Music by: Wayne Lavallee
- Production company: Screen Siren Pictures
- Distributed by: Photon Films
- Release date: September 13, 2026 (TIFF)
- Running time: 107 minutes
- Country: Canada
- Language: English

How We Stand is a Canadian drama film, directed by Marie Clements and released in 2026. The film tells the story of three Native American sisters from Oklahoma who traveled with their mother to Los Angeles in the 1960s as part of a relocation program aimed at "civilizing" Native Americans, but whose lives took very different paths after their mother was killed not long after their arrival.

The film stars Amber Midthunder, Cara Jade Myers and Alyssa Wapanatâhk, with its supporting cast including Isabel Deroy-Olson, Eric Johnson, Darren Mann, Gary Farmer and Gil Bellows.

== Production ==
The film entered production in 2025 in Vancouver and the Okanagan region of British Columbia, under the working title Tombs. It is an adaptation of her theatrical play Tombs of the Vanishing Indian.

== Distribution ==
The film premiered in the Centrepiece program at the 2026 Toronto International Film Festival.

== Critical response ==
For That Shelf, Sarah Gopaul wrote that "writer-director Marie Clements expertly intertwines the three stories, exposing each woman’s present-day betrayals by the system and the men in their lives. Even though they have different lifestyles, their personal pain and past trauma continues to affect them, too. Their distress draws them back to the last place they were all together and their bond transcends the distances that separate them."

== Awards ==
At the 2026 Vancouver International Film Festival, it won the Arbutus Award for Best British Columbia Film.

The film is also slated to screen in the Borsos Competition program at the 2026 Whistler Film Festival.
