= Toby Stephens =

English actor (born 1969)

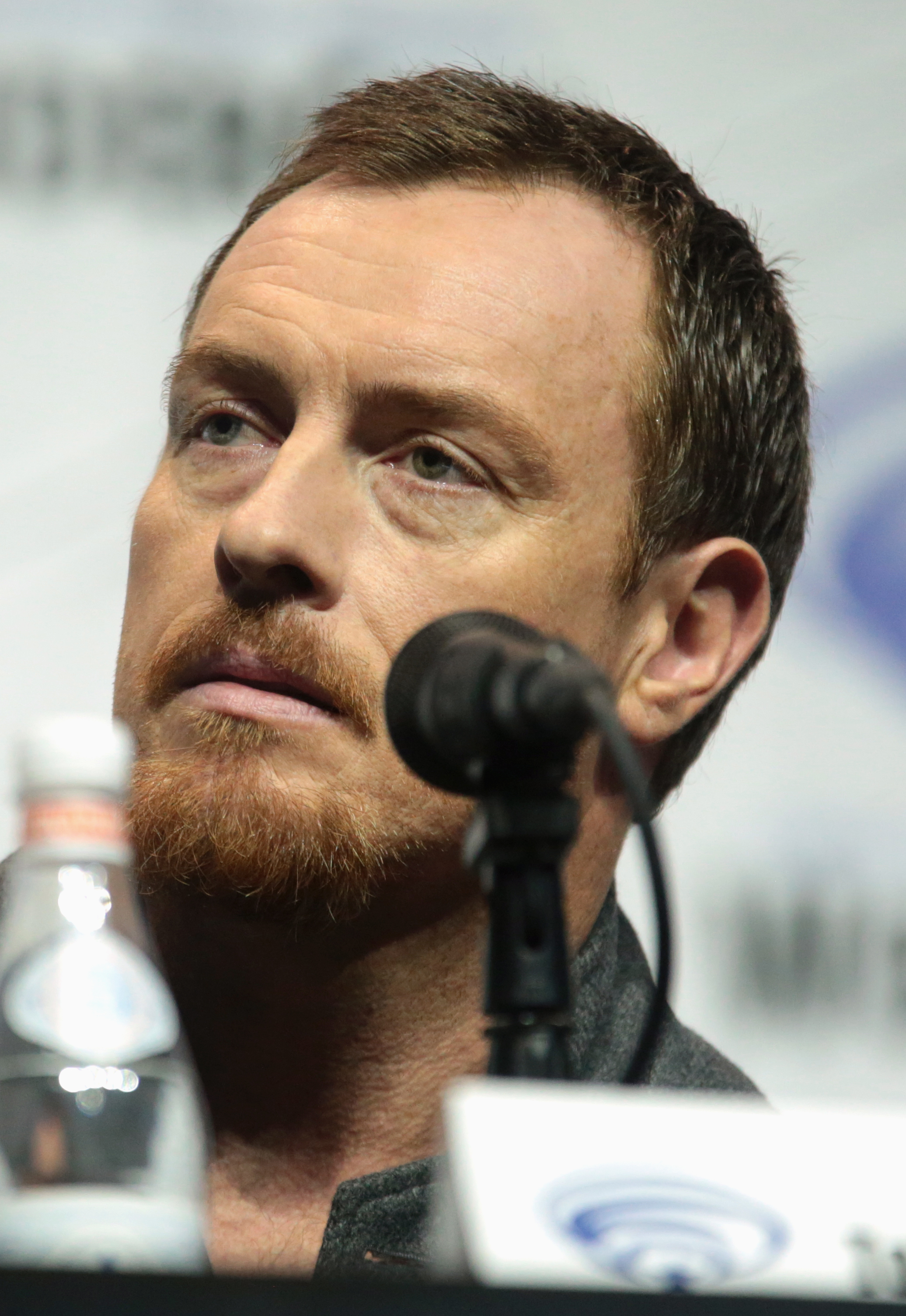
- Stephens in 2018
- Born: 21 April 1969 (age 57); London, England
- Occupation: Actor
- Years active: 1992–present
- Spouse: Anna-Louise Plowman (m. 2001)
- Children: 3
- Parents: Robert Stephens (father); Maggie Smith (mother)
- Relatives: Chris Larkin (brother)

Toby Stephens (born 21 April 1969) is an English actor who has appeared in films in the United Kingdom, United States, and India. He is known for the roles of Bond villain Gustav Graves in the 2002 James Bond film Die Another Day, for which he was nominated for the Saturn Award for Best Supporting Actor; William Gordon in the 2005 Bollywood film Mangal Pandey: The Rising; and Edward Fairfax Rochester in the 2006 BBC television adaptation of Jane Eyre. From 2014 to 2017, he starred as Captain Flint in the Starz television series Black Sails, followed by one of the lead roles in the Netflix science fiction series Lost in Space from 2018 to 2021. He portrays the Greek god Poseidon in Percy Jackson and the Olympians.

== Early life and education ==
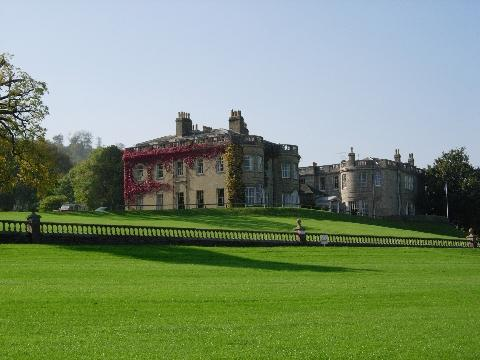
Seaford College

Toby Stephens was born in London, the younger son of actors Dame Maggie Smith and Sir Robert Stephens.

He was educated at Aldro School and Seaford College in West Sussex.

He then trained at the London Academy of Music and Dramatic Art (LAMDA).

== Career ==
Stephens began his film career with the role of Othello in 1992, in Sally Potter's Orlando. He has since made regular appearances on television (including in The Camomile Lawn, 1992) and on stage.

He played the title role in a Royal Shakespeare Company production of Coriolanus shortly after graduation from LAMDA; that same season he played Claudio in Measure for Measure for the RSC. He played Stanley Kowalski in a West End production of Tennessee Williams' A Streetcar Named Desire, and Hamlet in 2004. He has appeared on Broadway in Ring Round the Moon. He played the lead in the film Photographing Fairies and played Orsino in Trevor Nunn's 1996 film adaptation of William Shakespeare's Twelfth Night. In 2002, he took on the role of Gustav Graves in the James Bond film Die Another Day. Aged 33 at the time of film's release, he remains the youngest actor to have played a Bond villain. The following year, he depicted British double-agent Kim Philby in the BBC miniseries Cambridge Spies, co-starring with Tom Hollander, Samuel West, and Rupert Penry-Jones.

In 2005, he played the role of a British Army captain in the Indian film, The Rising: Ballad of Mangal Pandey, portraying events in the Indian rebellion of 1857. The following year he returned to India to play a renegade British East India Company officer in Sharpe's Challenge. In late 2006, he starred as Edward Rochester in the highly acclaimed BBC television adaptation of Jane Eyre (broadcast in the United States on PBS in early 2007) and The Wild West in February 2007 for the BBC in which he played General George Armstrong Custer in Custer's Last Stand.

During mid-2007, Stephens played the role of Jerry in a revival of Harold Pinter's Betrayal under the direction of Roger Michell. Later that year, Stephens starred as Horner in Jonathan Kent's revival of William Wycherley's The Country Wife. The play was the inaugural production of the Theatre Royal Haymarket Company.

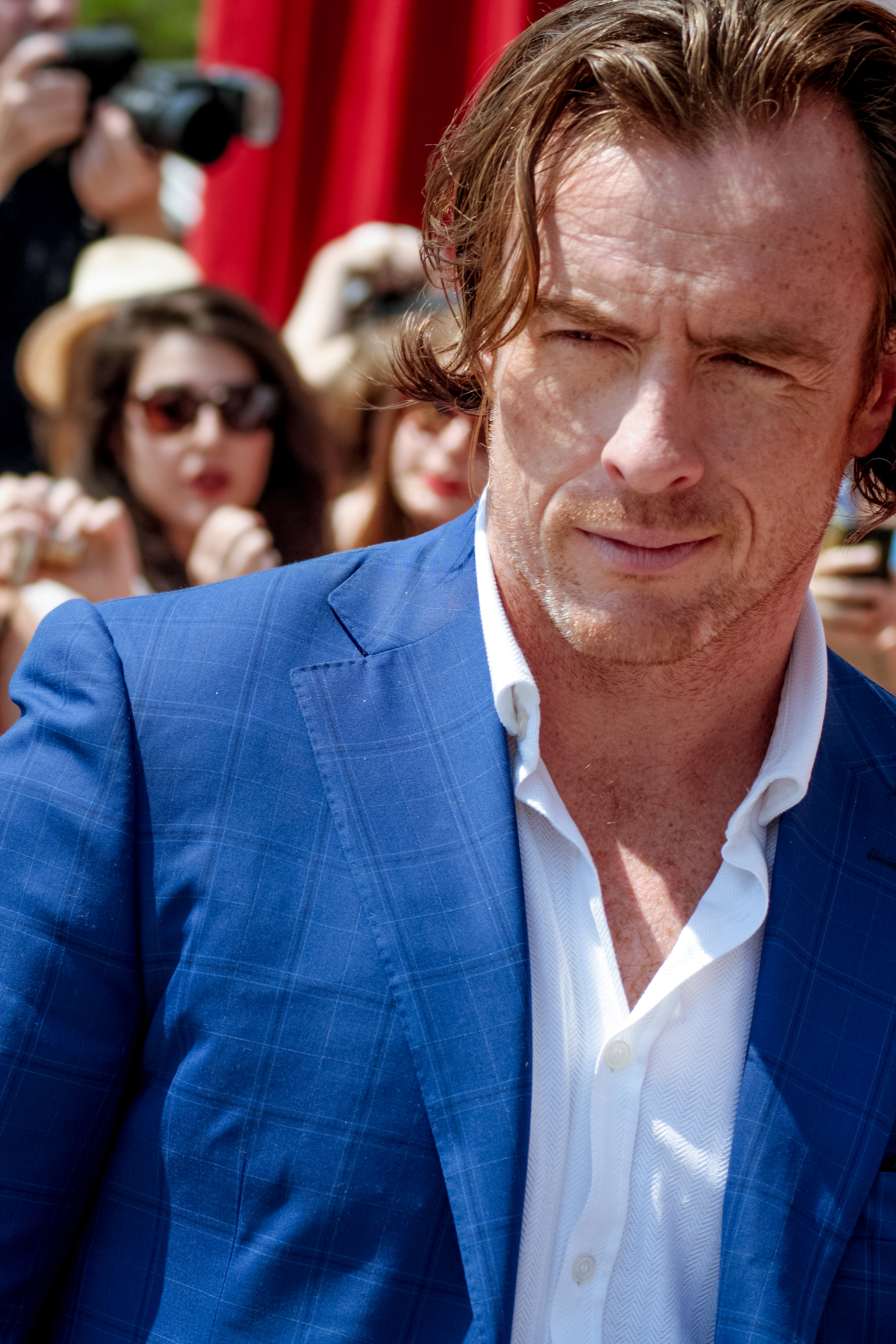
Stephens in 2014

In February 2008, the Fox Broadcasting Company gave the go-ahead to cast Stephens as the lead in a potential one-hour, primetime US television show, Inseparable, to be produced by Shaun Cassidy. Billed as a modern Jekyll and Hyde story, the show was to feature a partially paralysed forensic psychologist whose other personality is a charming criminal. Stephens' casting was highly unusual, because Fox had not yet approved a script nor purchased a pilot for the show. However, in mid-May 2008, The Hollywood Reporter announced that "[b]y the time the network picked up the pilot (...) [the producers'] hold on Stephens had expired (...)"

In May 2008, Stephens performed the role of James Bond in a BBC Radio 4 production of Ian Fleming's Dr. No, as part of the centenary celebration of Fleming's birth. The production was reportedly the first BBC radio dramatisation of the novel though Moonraker was on South African radio in 1956, with Bob Holness providing the voice of Bond. He has since appeared in a number of adaptations of other James Bond novels.

Also in May 2008, Stock-pot Productions announced that Stephens would have the lead role in a feature-length film entitled Fly Me, co-starring Tim McInnerny. Stock-pot was the producer of One Day, a short 2006 film shown at international film festivals, in which Stephens played a small part as the boss of McInnerny's character.

On 5 October 2008, Stephens appeared on stage at the London Palladium as part of a benefit entitled "The Story of James Bond, A Tribute to Ian Fleming". The event, organised by Fleming's niece, Lucy Fleming, featured music from various James Bond films and Bond film stars reading from Fleming's Bond novels. Stephens took the part of James Bond himself in the readings.

In early December 2008, Stephens read from Coda, the last book written by friend Simon Gray, for BBC Radio 4. The excerpts from which Stephens read included Gray's description of his participation as godfather at the christening of Stephens' son Eli.

Early in 2009, Stephens appeared as Prince John in season 3 of the BBC series Robin Hood. The series aired on BBC America in the United States. Stephens appeared in two episodes of a six-part television series, Strike Back, based on the novel by Chris Ryan. The series aired in May 2010.

In mid-2009, Stephens returned to the London stage in the Donmar Warehouse production of Ibsen's A Doll's House alongside Gillian Anderson and Christopher Eccleston.

In 2010, he starred in the made-for-television film The Blue Geranium, a further sequel to the television series and films based on Agatha Christie's Miss Marple character. The show was broadcast in the US on PBS in June 2010. Stephens starred as a highly self-centred detective opposite Lucy Punch in a three-part comedy television series for BBC Two entitled Vexed.

Stephens took on a small supporting role in a short film, The Lost Explorer, the directorial debut of photographer Tim Walker. The film is based on a short story by author Patrick McGrath.

On the London stage in the spring of 2010, Stephens received outstanding reviews for his performance as Henry in a revival of Tom Stoppard's The Real Thing, directed by Anna Mackmin at the Old Vic Theatre in London. It was his debut at the Old Vic, where his parents performed as part of Laurence Olivier's Royal National Theatre Company.

In 2010, Stephens appeared as Georges Danton in Danton's Death. The play was another debut for Stephens, this time at London's Royal National Theatre.

Over the years, Stephens has continued to prolifically narrate audiobooks and perform in broadcast radio dramas. In January 2011, Stephens joined other stars in narrating portions of the King James Version of the Bible for BBC Radio 4 as part of a celebration of the 400th anniversary of the Bible's publication. Stephens performed the role of Raymond Chandler's Philip Marlowe in a radio serial, which debuted in February 2011. Stephens narrated another audiobook, Paul Temple and the Geneva Mystery, released in February 2011.

From 2014 to 2017, Stephens starred as Captain James Flint in the Starz television series Black Sails, a prequel to Treasure Island, set in the early 18th century during the Golden Age of Piracy.

In 2016, he was cast as former British Prime Minister Tony Blair in the film The Journey.

Between 2018 and 2021, he appeared as John Robinson in Lost in Space, the Netflix remake of the 1965 TV series. In 2021, he featured as Damian Cray in the second season of Alex Rider.

He appeared as the Greek God Poseidon in the series Percy Jackson and the Olympians, the Disney+ adaptation of the books by the same name.

In 2025, it was announced that he would be portraying Captain Hook and Mr. Darling in the London revival by the RSC of Ella Hickson's 2013 play Wendy & Peter Pan alongside Lolita Chakrabarti and Alexander Molony.

== Personal life ==
Stephens and New Zealand-born actress Anna-Louise Plowman were married in 2001. Their first child, a son, was born in 2007. Their daughters were born in 2009 and 2010, respectively.

Plowman and Stephens performed together as Sibyl and Elyot in Jonathan Kent's revival of Private Lives, the Noël Coward play in which his mother starred in 1975 on Broadway, for the 2012 Chichester Festival, reprised at the Gielgud Theatre in 2013.

== Filmography ==
=== Film ===
Year	Title	Role	Notes
1992	Orlando	Othello	
1996	Twelfth Night	Duke Orsino	
1997	Photographing Fairies	Charles Castle	
1998	Cousin Bette	Victorin Hulot	
1999	Onegin	Vladimir Lensky	
1999	Sunset Heights	Luke Bradley	
2000	The Announcement	Ross	
2000	Space Cowboys	Young Frank	
2001	Possession	Fergus Wolfe	
2002	Die Another Day	Gustav Graves	
2004	Terkel in Trouble	Justin (voice)	English dub
2005	Midsummer Dream	Demetrius (voice)	English dub
2005	Mangal Pandey: The Rising	Captain William Gordon	
2006	Dark Corners	Dr Woodleigh	
2006	Severance	Harris	
2013	Believe	Dr Farquar	
2013	All Things to All Men	Riley	
2013	The Machine	Vincent McCarthy	
2016	13 Hours: The Secret Soldiers of Benghazi	Glen "Bub" Doherty	
2016	The Journey	Tony Blair	
2018	Hunter Killer	Lt. Bill Beaman	
2024	The Severed Sun	The Pastor	
2025	Giant	Frank Warren	
2025	Mārama	Nathaniel Cole	
2025	The Morrigan	Malachy Crowley	

=== Television ===
Year	Title	Role	Notes
1992	The Camomile Lawn	Oliver	
1996	The Tenant of Wildfell Hall	Gilbert Markham	
2000	The Great Gatsby	Jay Gatsby	
2001	Perfect Strangers	Charles	
2002	Napoléon	Tsar Alexander I	
2003	Essential Byron	Reader	
2003	Cambridge Spies	Kim Philby	
2003	Agatha Christie's Poirot	Philip Blake	Episode: "Five Little Pigs"
2004	London	Casanova	
2005	Waking the Dead	Nick Henderson	Episodes: "Subterraneans Part I" and "Subterraneans II"
2005	The Queen's Sister	Antony Armstrong-Jones	
2006	The Best Man	Peter Tremaine	
2006	Secrets of the Dead: The Umbrella Assassin	Narrator (voice)	Episode: "An account of the murder of Georgi Markov"
2006	Sharpe's Challenge	William Dodd	
2006	Jane Eyre	Edward Fairfax Rochester	
2007	The Wild West – Custer's Last Stand	General George Armstrong Custer	
2008	Wired	Crawford Hill	
2009	The Best Job in the World	Narrator (voice)	
2009	Robin Hood	Prince John of England	3 episodes
2010	Strike Back	Arlington	
2010	Lost: The Mystery of Flight 447	Narrator (voice)	
2010	Agatha Christie's Marple The Blue Geranium	George Pritchard	
2010–2012	Vexed	Jack Armstrong	
2012	Law & Order: UK	Martin Middlebrook	Episode: "Trial"
2012	Lewis	David Connelly	Episode: "Generation of Vipers"
2014–2017	Black Sails	James McGraw / Flint	38 episodes
2015	And Then There Were None	Edward Armstrong	
2018–2021	Lost in Space	John Robinson	28 episodes
2019	Summer of Rockets	Samuel Petrukhin	
2021	Alex Rider	Damian Cray	6 episodes
2022	Prisoner C33	Oscar Wilde	
2023	Six Four	Piers Fields-Turner	2 episodes
2023	Dodger	Martin Van Buren	Episode: "Coronation"
2024–2026	Percy Jackson and the Olympians	Poseidon	3 episodes
2024	McDonald & Dodds	Mark Holgate	Episode: "The Rule of Three"
2024	One Day	Lionel	Episode 1.9
2024	Batman: Caped Crusader	Gentleman Ghost / James "Jim" Craddock (voice)	
2024	The Split	Archie Moore	Two-part special
2025	A Cruel Love: The Ruth Ellis Story	Melford Stevenson	
2026	The Season	Christopher Hext	

=== Video games ===
Year	Title	Voice role	Notes
2012	007 Legends	Gustav Graves	Also likeness

=== Theatre ===
Year	Title	Role	Venue	Notes
1992	Tartuffe	Damis	Playhouse Theatre	
1992	Tamburlaine	Celebinus / King of Argier	Royal Shakespeare Company	
1992	Antony and Cleopatra	Pompey	Royal Shakespeare Company	
1992	All's Well That Ends Well	Bertram	Royal Shakespeare Company	
1993	Wallenstein	Max Piccolomini	Royal Shakespeare Company	
1994	Unfinished Business	Young Beamish	Royal Shakespeare Company	
1994	Coriolanus	Caius Marcius Coriolanus	Royal Shakespeare Company	
1994	A Midsummer Night's Dream	Lysander	Royal Shakespeare Company	
1994	Measure for Measure	Claudio	Royal Shakespeare Company	
1996	A Streetcar Named Desire	Stanley Kowalski	Theatre Royal Haymarket	
1998–1999	Phedre	Hippolytus	Almeida Theatre / BAM	
1998–1999	Britannicus	Nero	Almeida Theatre / BAM	
1999	Ring Round the Moon	Hugo / Frederick	Lincoln Centre	
2001	Japes	Japes	Theatre Royal Haymarket	
2001	The Royal Family	Anthony Cavendish	Theatre Royal Haymarket	
2004	Hamlet	Hamlet	Royal Shakespeare Company	
2004	The Pilate Workshop	Jesus	Royal Shakespeare Company	
2007	Betrayal	Jerry	Donmar Warehouse	
2007	The Country Wife	Mr Horner	Theatre Royal Haymarket	
2009	A Doll's House	Thomas	Donmar Warehouse	
2010	The Real Thing	Henry	Old Vic	
2010	Danton's Death	Georges Danton	Royal National Theatre	
2012–2013	Private Lives	Elyot Chase	Gielgud Theatre	
2017	Oslo	Terje Rød-Larsen	Royal National Theatre / Harold Pinter Theatre	
2019	A Day in the Death of Joe Egg	Bri	Trafalgar Studios	
2022	The Forest	Man 1	Hampstead Theatre	
2024	Corruption	Tom Watson	Lincoln Center Theater	
2025	Wendy and Peter Pan	Captain Hook	Barbican Theatre	
2026	Equus (play)	Martin Dysart	Menier Chocolate Factory	

=== Radio drama and audio books ===
Year	Title	Role	Notes
1994	Time and the Conways	Robin	
1995	The Prince's Choice	Coriolanus, Hamlet, Henry V, Henry IV and Edward Poins	
1997	As You Like It	Orlando	
1997	The Lifted Veil	Latimer	
1997	The Guns of Navarone	Mallory	
1997	Birdsong		
1997	Anna Karenina	Count Vronsky	
1998	Troy	Achilles	
1999	Tales from the Arabian Nights	Narrator	
1999	Macbeth	Macbeth	
2000	Conversations with Napoleon	Reader	
2001	King Lear	Edmund	
2001	On the Road	Narrator	
2002	The Riddle of the Sands	Narrator	
2002	The Woman in White	Walter Hartright	
2002	Aeneid	Aeneas	
2003	Dionysos	Pentheus, King of Thebes	
2004	Will in the World	Reader	
2005	Much Ado About Nothing	Benedick	
2006	Shylock	Bassanio	
2007	Heart of Darkness	Narrator	
2007	Flashman on the March	Narrator	
2008	Flashman and the Dragon	Narrator	
2008	Missing Dates	Jason (Japes)	
2008	The Good Soldier	Narrator	
2008	Dr. No	James Bond	
2008	Let's Murder Vivaldi	Ben	
2008	Coda	Simon Gray	
2008–2009	The Dark Flower	Narrator	
2009	My Dark Places	James Ellroy	
2009	Journey into Space: The Host	Jet	
2009	King Solomon's Mines	Narrator	
2009	Becket	King Henry II	
2010	Dick Barton Special Agent: The Mystery of the Missing Formula	Narrator	
2010	Goldfinger	James Bond	
2010	No Place Like Home	Jonathan	
2011	King James Version of the Bible	Narrator	
2011	Paul Temple and the Geneva Mystery	Narrator	
2011	Paul Temple and the Margo Mystery	Narrator	
2011	Paul Temple Intervenes	Narrator	
2011	The Lady in the Lake	Philip Marlowe	
2011	The Big Sleep	Philip Marlowe	
2011	Farewell, My Lovely	Philip Marlowe	
2011	Playback	Philip Marlowe	
2011	Carte Blanche	Narrator	
2011	The Long Goodbye	Philip Marlowe	
2011	The High Window	Philip Marlowe	
2011	The Little Sister	Philip Marlowe	
2011	Poodle Springs	Philip Marlowe	
2012	From Russia, with Love	James Bond	
2014	On Her Majesty's Secret Service	James Bond	
2015	Diamonds Are Forever	James Bond	
2016	Thunderball	James Bond	
2018	Moonraker	James Bond	
2018	Sea of Thieves: Athena's Fortune	Narrator	
2019	Live and Let Die	James Bond	
2020	The Man with the Golden Gun	James Bond	
2025	Casino Royale	James Bond	

== Awards ==
- 1992—Ian Charleson Award Second Prize: for Bertram in All's Well That Ends Well (Swan Theatre)
- 1994—Ian Charleson Award (best classical actor under 30): for Coriolanus in Coriolanus (Royal Shakespeare Company)
- 1994—Sir John Gielgud Award (best actor): for Coriolanus in Coriolanus (Royal Shakespeare Company)
- 1999—Theatre World Award (debut performance on Broadway): for Hugo/Frederick in Ring Round the Moon (Lincoln Center Theater)
