= Father Joe (film) =

2026 action thriller film

- Directed by: Barthélémy Grossmann
- Written by: Luc Besson
- Produced by: Luc Besson; Kiefer Sutherland
- Starring: Kiefer Sutherland; Al Pacino; Ever Anderson
- Production companies: EuropaCorp; LBP
- Release date: 5 September 2026 (Venice)
- Running time: 116 minutes
- Country: France
- Language: English

Father Joe is a 2026 French English-language action thriller film directed by Barthélémy Grossmann (in his directing debut), and written by Luc Besson. It stars Kiefer Sutherland, Al Pacino, and Ever Anderson.

The film had its world premiere out of competition of the 83rd Venice International Film Festival on 5 September 2026.

== Premise ==
In 1990s Manhattan, a priest clashes with a mob boss.

== Cast ==
- Kiefer Sutherland as Father Joe
- Al Pacino
- Ever Anderson
- Fred Melamed
- Michael Lockerbie as Rizzo

== Production ==
The film is written and produced by Luc Besson and directed by Barthélémy Grossmann. It is produced by EuropaCorp and LBP (Luc Besson Production). The cast is led by Kiefer Sutherland (who is also a producer) with Al Pacino and Ever Anderson, Besson's former wife Milla Jovovich's daughter.

Principal photography began in October 2025 in Paris, which stood in for 1990s Manhattan.
