= Birdsong (radio drama) =

1997 BBC Radio 4 adaptation of the novel

- Genre: Radio drama
- Running time: 60 minutes
- Country of origin: United Kingdom
- Language: English
- Home station: BBC Radio 4
- Syndicates: BBC Radio 4 Extra
- Starring: Toby Stephens; Sophie Ward; John Rowe; Gavin Muir; Rachel Atkins
- Created by: Sebastian Faulks
- Written by: Nick Stafford
- Directed by: Claire Grove
- Original release: 27 October – 10 November 1997
- No. of series: 1
- No. of episodes: 3
- Audio format: Stereophonic sound
- Website: www.bbc.co.uk/programmes/b00f3z8p

Birdsong is a three-part radio adaptation by Nick Stafford of the novel of the same title by Sebastian Faulks. It was first broadcast in the Classic Serial strand on BBC Radio 4 on 27 October, 3 November, and 10 November 1997. It was directed by Claire Grove. Its cast included Toby Stephens (Stephen Wraysford), Sophie Ward (Isabelle Azaire), John Rowe (René Azaire/Robert), Gavin Muir (Jack Firebrace), and Rachel Atkins (Elizabeth Benson).

== Sources ==
- https://web.archive.org/web/20110928031156/http://www.rlf.org.uk/fellowshipscheme/profile.cfm?fellow=48&menu=4
