= Icefall (film) =

American thriller film

- Release poster
- Directed by: Stefan Ruzowitzky
- Written by: George Mahaffey; Steve Isles
- Produced by: Gary Hamilton; Ying Ye; Ryan Hamilton; Adam Bramich; Rob Van Norden; Volodymyr Artemenko; Eugene Stupka
- Starring: Joel Kinnaman; Cara Jade Myers; Danny Huston; Graham Greene
- Cinematography: Benedict Neuenfels
- Edited by: William Paley
- Music by: Deepak Ramapriyan
- Production companies: Arclight Films; Top Film
- Distributed by: Aura Entertainment
- Release date: November 4, 2025
- Running time: 96 minutes
- Country: United States
- Language: English

Icefall is a 2025 American action thriller film directed by Stefan Ruzowitzky and written by George Mahaffey and Steve Isles. It has Joel Kinnaman and Cara Jade Myers in the lead roles.

The film was released on November 4, 2025.

== Plot ==
A group of men led by Drake enter a pawn shop and give the manager a clock, which is actually a time bomb. When the bomb explodes, the men rob the store, and murder the remaining employees to leave no witnesses. The gang transports the loot on a plane, but due to inclement weather, it crashes at a remote location. Five months later, winter sets in, covering the place in snow and ice.

A lone man (Harlan) is walking around the location while fishing, and sees a human hand sticking out from the ice. He frees the dead body, and notices a black suitcase full of cash. He takes the money to his hideout, but his actions silently trigger a tracking device inside the suitcase.

Drake pays a visit to another gang member Pen, who is now a preacher, and informs him that the tracker was tripped the day before on a lake, containing the booty which is worth $20 million dollars. Drake wants Pen to be his guide, along with other gang members - Sirena and Ellis. They monitor the tracker to be moving on the ice, indicating either water currents or a person.

Ani is a Blackfoot Native American woman and a Game Warden with the Montana wildlife department. She sees an old man's (Jed's) truck stuck on the ice and while helping him, watches Harlan walking by and suspects him to be a poacher. She inspects Harlan's belongings, and sees a suitcase full of cash, and not receving reasonable answers, handcuffs him. A truck approaches them, whereupon the gang members including Drake get out and a shootout ensues, during which Jed is killed. Ani is able to drive away on her truck with Harlan on the back, but the suitcase with cash falls into the ice water. Ani's car breaks down, and Harlan takes Ani to his hideout.

Dax joins the other gang members and pursues Ani and Harlan in a snowmobile, but it gets stuck on a beartrap placed strategically by Harlan and Dax is thrown out of his vehicle. In the course of a fight with Ani and Harlan, Dax is killed. The gang members arrive at Harlan's hideout and follow the Ani and Harlan into the woods. The gang members spend the night at a log cabin, while Ani and Harlan go deep into a cave. Harlan tells Ani that his wife Mia, who was Blackfoot, is now dead.

The gang leader Rhodes arrives and consoles Sirena. He reveals that he was fully aware of Ellis's plot to steal the money, and stabs him to death. Rhodes declares that the gang will kill Ani and Harlan the next day.

Ani takes Harlan to see the chief of the tribe, Oz, who blames Harlan for effectively killing Mia. Oz also accuses Ani of selling out and losing connection to their land. Ani calls the Sheriff, who immediately upon reaching Ani, questions her about the plane. When Ani confronts him with the fact that she never told him about the plane, the Sheriff confesses that he gets a 5% share of the robbery for aiding the gang. Taking Ani and Harlan hostage, the Sheriff drives to meet with Rhodes.

Harlan offers to take the Sheriff to the plane so that he can collect the entire amount of the stolen cash instead of only 5% of it. The Sheriff believes Harlan, who tricks the Sheriff into stepping on a beartrap. The gang members reach the Sheriff, and he is shot dead by Sirena, while Harlan then shoots Sirena dead. Pen is shot, but before collapsing, he throws a cigarette lighter to fire up the methane gas atop the ice, killing Rhodes. Drake holds Ani hostage and asks Harlan to give him the location of the loot, but Harlan kills Drake and throws his body into the water.

Harlan is finally initiated into the Blackfoot tribe. The authorities found the plane with $4 million cash, and Ani asks Oz about the rest of the money, who evades the question. She observes that a new Community hospital was now funded and wonders where the money came from. Harlan plays with Ani's daughter and they smile.

== Cast ==
- Joel Kinnaman as Harlan
- Cara Jade Myers as Ani
- Danny Huston as Rhodes
- Graham Greene as Oz
- Martin Sensmeier as Pen
- Oliver Trevena as Dax
- Devaughn Nixon as Drake
- Frida Gustavsson as Sirena
- William Fletcher as Ellis

== Production ==
The project was announced in November 2023 with production by Arclight Films and its producers Gary Hamilton and Ying Ye; Top Film and its producers Volodymyr Artemenko and Eugene Stupka; along with Ryan Hamilton, Rob Van Norden, and Adam Bramich. Stefan Ruzowitzky is directing from a script by George Mahaffey and Steve Isles.

The cast is led by Joel Kinnaman and Cara Jade Myers. The cast also includes Danny Huston, Martin Sensmeier, Oliver Trevena, Devaughn Nixon and Graham Greene, in one of his last screen roles.

Principal photography got underway in Bulgaria in early 2024. First look images from filming were released in May 2024, and production wrapped in Bulgaria in June 2024.

== Release ==
Icefall was released on video on demand on November 4, 2025.
