= Nick Stafford =

British playwright and writer (born 1959)

Nick Stafford (born Nicholas Thomas, 1959 in Staffordshire) is a British playwright and writer. He is best known for writing the stage adaptation of Michael Morpurgo's novel War Horse, which garnered him a Laurence Olivier Award nomination for Best New Play in 2008, and the Tony Award for Best Play in 2011.

== Career ==
Stafford trained at Rose Bruford College of Theatre and Performance, and his first professionally produced play was commissioned in 1987 by the Half Moon Young People's Theatre, where Stafford was writer-in-residence. He also got commissions from other small companies, before going to the Young Vic, also as writer-in-residence. His first play there, The Snow Queen, ran for two years. He has had several plays produced at the National Theatre and at Birmingham Rep. Stafford's adaptation of Michael Morpurgo's novel War Horse was first produced in London in 2007, where it is still running; other productions have been staged on Broadway, and in Toronto, Canada. Five of his plays have been published by Faber and Faber.

Stafford also has had several plays produced on BBC Radio 4, and has been commissioned to write movies and television drama; none of these bar a BBC short has been filmed.

Stafford was a Royal Literary Fund Fellow at Roehampton University from 2003–06 and at the University of Southampton from 2007–09.

Stafford's first novel, Armistice, was published in 2009.

== Works ==
=== Plays ===
- 1987–1988 Five plays written for the Half Moon Young People's Theatre when Writer-in-residence.
- 1989 Easy Prey, first produced by Avon Touring.
- 1990 Back of the Bus, first produced at the New Perspectives Theatre.
- 1990 The Canal Ghost, first produced at the Birmingham Rep Studio.
- 1991 The Hopeful, first produced at the Young Vic, London.
- 1991 The Snow Queen, first produced at the Young Vic, London. Adapted from the fairy tale by Hans Christian Andersen
- 1992 Moll Cutpurse, first produced at The Drill Hall, London.
- 1992 The Devil's Only Sleeping, first produced at Birmingham Rep.
- 1993 Listen With Da Da, first produced at the Serpentine Gallery
- 1995 The Go-Between, first produced at the Royal Theatre, Northampton. Adapted from the novel by L. P. Hartley.
- 1995 Grab The Dog, first produced at the National Theatre Studio.
- 1996 That Day at the Beach, first produced at the National Theatre Studio.
- 1997 Whisper of Angel's Wings, first produced at Birmingham Rep.
- 1999 Battle Royal, first produced at the Lyttelton Theatre at the National Theatre in London.
- 2001 The Chain Play, first produced at the Olivier Theatre, also at the National Theatre, London.
- 2001 Luminosity, first produced at The Pit, Barbican Centre, London, by the Royal Shakespeare Company.
- 2004 Love Me Tonight, first produced at Hampstead Theatre, London.
- 2006 Katherine Desouza, first produced at The Door at Birmingham Rep.
- 2007 War Horse, first produced at the Olivier Theatre, at the National Theatre, London. Adapted from the novel by Michael Morpurgo.

=== Radio plays ===
All were produced for BBC Radio 4.

- The Fire Inside.
- Birdsong, adapted from the novel by Sebastian Faulks.
- A Thousand Acres, adapted from the novel by Jane Smiley.
- A Year and a Day.
- The List Two plays for VE Day.
- Frankenstein, adapted from the novel by Mary Shelley.
- La Petite Mort.
- Ring of Roses.
- A Matter of Sex Winner of Sony Award Best Original Script.

=== Novels ===
- 2009 Armistice novel.
