= Ever Anderson =

American actress (born 2007)

- Anderson in 2026
- Born: Ever Gabo Anderson; November 3, 2007 (age 19); Los Angeles, California, U.S
- Occupations: Actress, model
- Years active: 2016–present
- Parents: Paul W. S. Anderson (father); Milla Jovovich (mother)
- Relatives: Galina Loginova (grandmother)

Ever Gabo Anderson (born November 3, 2007) is an American actress. The daughter of actress Milla Jovovich and filmmaker Paul W. S. Anderson, she is known for portraying the young Alicia Marcus/Red Queen in the 2016 film Resident Evil: The Final Chapter, young Natasha Romanoff in the 2021 film Black Widow, and Wendy Darling in the 2023 film Peter Pan & Wendy.

== Early life ==
Born and raised in Los Angeles, California, Anderson is the daughter of Soviet-born actress Milla Jovovich and English director Paul W. S. Anderson. She has two younger sisters. She is of Russian and Serbian descent through her mother, and of English descent through her father.

== Career ==
Anderson's parents tried to discourage her entering into acting but she could not be dissuaded. At age nine, she was on the cover of Vogue Bambini, photographed by Ellen von Unwerth. Anderson has also been photographed by Karl Lagerfeld, Mikael Jansson, and Peter Lindbergh.

Her first feature film appearance was in Resident Evil: The Final Chapter (2016), directed by her father. In it, she played a younger Alicia Marcus, whose adult counterpart was played by her mother.

In March 2020, Anderson was cast as a younger Natasha Romanoff in the 2021 Marvel Cinematic Universe (MCU) film Black Widow, and Wendy Darling in the 2023 film Peter Pan & Wendy.

== Personal life ==
Anderson practices taekwondo. She lives in the Hollywood Hills neighborhood of Los Angeles, California. In addition to her native languages, English and Russian, she can also speak French and studies Japanese.

== Filmography ==
=== Film ===
Key
†	Denotes films that have not yet been released

Year	Title	Role	Notes
2016	Resident Evil: The Final Chapter	Young Alicia Marcus / Red Queen	
2021	Black Widow	Young Natasha Romanoff	
2023	Peter Pan & Wendy	Wendy Darling	
2026	Father Joe	TBA	

=== Television ===
Key
†	Denotes television productions that have not yet been released

Year	Title	Role	Notes
2025	The Artist	Evelyn Nesbit	6 episodes
