= Wendy Darling =

Character created by J.M. Barrie

- Peter Pan character
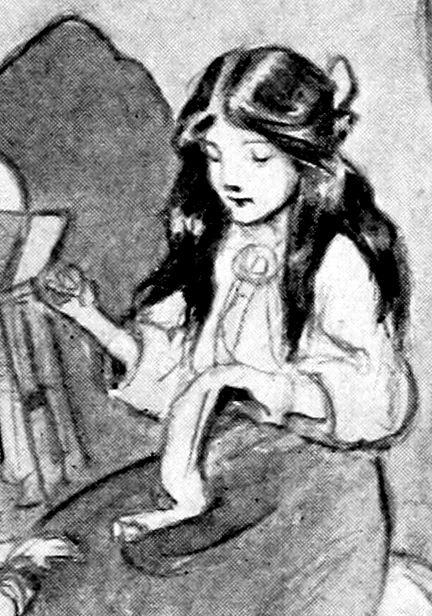
- 1907 illustration by Oliver Herford of Wendy
- First appearance: Peter Pan (1904)
- Created by: J. M. Barrie
- Portrayed by: Hilda Trevelyan (UK first 1904 production); Mildred Morris (US first 1905 production ) Mary Brian (1924 film); Kathryn Beaumont (The Walt Disney Christmas Show); Maggie Smith (Hook); Rachel Hurd-Wood (2003 film); Freya Tingley (Once Upon a Time); Ever Anderson (Peter Pan & Wendy); Hazel Doupe (Peter and Wendy TV film); Megan Placito (Peter Pan's Neverland Nightmare)
- Voiced by: Kathryn Beaumont (1953 film; other Disney media until 2005); Kath Soucie (Return to Never Land); Hynden Walch (other Disney media; 2005-present); Maia Mitchell (Jake and the Never Land Pirates)

In-universe information
- Species: Human
- Gender: Female
- Family: John Darling (brother); Michael Darling (brother)
- Children: Jane (daughter)
- Relatives: Margaret (grandchild)
- Nationality: English

Wendy Moira Angela Darling is a fictional character and one of the main protagonists of the 1904 play and 1911 novel Peter and Wendy by J. M. Barrie, as well as in most adaptations in other media. Her exact age is not specified in the original play or novel by Barrie, though it is implied that she is about Peter's age as she is "just Peter's size".

As a girl on the verge of adulthood, she stands in contrast to Peter Pan, a boy who refuses to grow up, the major theme of the Peter Pan stories. Wendy hesitates at first to fly off to Neverland, but she comes to enjoy her adventures. Ultimately, she chooses to go back to her parents and accepts that she has to grow up.

== Background ==
In the novel Peter and Wendy, and its cinematic adaptations, she is an Edwardian schoolgirl. The novel states that she attends a "kindergarten school" with her two younger brothers, meaning a school for pre-adolescent children. Like Peter, in many adaptations of the story she is shown to be on the brink of adolescence. She belongs to a middle class London household of that era, and is the daughter of George Darling, a short-tempered and pompous office worker, and his wife, Mary. Wendy shares a nursery room with her two brothers, John and Michael. However, in the Disney version, her father decides that "it's high time she had a room of her own" out of the nursery for "stuffing the boys' heads with a lot of silly stories", but changes his mind at the end of the film when he returns home with his wife after the party.

=== Character ===
Wendy is the most developed character in the story of Peter Pan, and is considered a main protagonist. She is proud of her own childhood and enjoys telling stories and fantasising. She has a distaste for adulthood, acquired partly by the example of it set by her father, whom she loves but fears due to his somewhat violent fits of anger. Her ambition early in the story is to somehow avoid growing up. She is granted this opportunity by Peter Pan, who takes her and her brothers to Neverland, where they can remain young forever.

Wendy finds that this experience brings out her more adult side. Peter and the tribe of Lost Boys who dwell in Neverland want her to be their "mother" (a role they remember only vaguely), a request she tentatively accedes to, performing various domestic tasks for them. There is also a degree of innocent flirtation with Peter which incites jealousy in Peter's fairy Tinker Bell. In Barrie's book Peter and Wendy, Wendy asks Peter at the end if he would like to speak to her parents about "a very sweet subject", implying that she would like him to speak to her parents about someday marrying her. Wendy eventually learns that adulthood has its rewards and returns to London, deciding not to postpone maturity any longer.

Barrie's short play When Wendy Grew Up – An Afterthought was first staged in 1908, and the story line included in the novel published in 1911. It was published in 1957 and sometimes incorporated into productions of the play. In Afterthought, Wendy has grown up and married, although it's not known whom she married, and has a daughter, Jane. When Peter returns looking for Wendy, he does not understand at first that Wendy is no longer a young girl, as he has no notion of time when in Neverland. He meets Jane and invites her to fly off with him to Neverland. Wendy lets her daughter go, trusting her to make the same choices as her. The narrator states that Jane has a daughter, Margaret, who will one day also go to Neverland with Peter Pan, and "in this way, it will go on for ever and ever, so long as children are young and innocent".

=== Physical appearance ===
Barrie does not give any description of Wendy, but she is generally depicted as a pretty girl with blond or brown hair. While Tiger Lily and Tinker Bell are usually portrayed as exotic or magical figures, Wendy represents the conventional English schoolgirl but also a mother figure who ultimately captures Peter Pan's attention.

=== Relationships ===
In the original novel and the 1953 Disney movie, Wendy has an easy relationship with her mother, Mary Darling. Her relationship with her father, George Darling, is more difficult as he is always serious and does not like Wendy telling stories to her brothers that he considers childish, threatening to move Wendy to her own room. However, Wendy and her father do love each other and when Wendy comes back from Neverland, she seems to have a better understanding of her father.

Wendy and her brothers, John Darling and Michael Darling, to whom she tells stories, have a good relationship. She shows great concern for them and is very protective of them. In the 1953 cartoon movie, she makes John and Michael realize that they need their real mother and persuades them to return home after their adventures in Neverland.

Wendy believes in Peter Pan and shares his stories with her brothers every night. When Wendy and Peter meet for the first time, she begins to care about him too. Romantic feelings between them are hinted at, but never articulated. In the 2003 film, the feeling is mutual and Wendy shows her love when she gives Peter a hidden kiss in order to save him from Captain Hook. They also have a special moment in the 2002 cartoon sequel to the 1953 film, Return to Neverland, when Peter and a grown-up Wendy are reunited for the first time in years and they share a final goodbye together. In Hook, an elderly Wendy hints she still has feelings for Peter (who has grown up and married her granddaughter, Moira), expressing surprise and possibly disappointment that he never stopped her wedding from happening.

=== The name Wendy ===
The first name Wendy was very uncommon in the English-speaking world before J. M. Barrie's work, and its subsequent popularity has led some to credit him with "inventing" it. Although the name Wendy was used to a limited extent as the familiar form of the Welsh name Gwendolyn, it is thought that Barrie took the name from a phrase used by Margaret Henley, a five-year-old girl whom Barrie befriended in the 1890s, daughter of his friend William Henley. She called Barrie her "friendy-wendy", which she pronounced as "fwendy-wendy". She died at the age of five of meningitis and was buried, along with her family, in Cockayne Hatley.

In Great Britain, South Africa, New Zealand and Australia, children's playhouses are commonly known as Wendy houses.

== In popular culture ==
=== On stage ===
In the first productions of the play at the Duke of York's theatre in London, from 1904 to 1909, she was portrayed by Hilda Trevelyan and at the first US production at the Empire Theatre in New York in 1905, by Mildred Morris.

=== In film ===
==== Live-action ====
- Peter Pan (1924 silent live-action film) – Mary Brian. The actress was 18, but publicity materials claimed she was 16.
- Hook (1991 live-action film) – Dame Maggie Smith plays an elderly Wendy, who is being honoured for her lifetime of work in finding homes for orphans. She was also a former neighbour of J. M. Barrie. Her granddaughter Moira is married to Peter Banning (Robin Williams), the former Peter Pan who has grown up and forgotten his life in Neverland. During a flashback to Peter's childhood, a younger Wendy is played by Gwyneth Paltrow. (Peter and Moira's daughter, Wendy's great-granddaughter, is Maggie, a common pet name for Margaret, the name of Jane's daughter, Wendy's granddaughter, in the original book by Barrie.)
- Peter Pan (2003 live-action film) – Rachel Hurd-Wood. In this film, as in Barrie's original treatment, Wendy easily falls into a mothering role with her male companions, but is conflicted by her romantic feelings towards Peter, who reacts with incomprehension and annoyance. She is also more adventurous than in most adaptations, taking part in the conflict with the pirates including sword fighting. Actor Jason Isaacs, who played Captain Hook in the film, stated in a 2019 interview: "J.M. Barrie wrote a book about a little girl [Wendy] who was hitting puberty...in those days, [in the Edwardian era], that meant you'd better have sex, have children, and build a family...[so she goes to Neverland]"
- Come Away – Ava Fillery portrays Wendy in the 2020 film, which acts as a crossover between Peter Pan and Alice in Wonderland. Wendy is depicted as Peter's niece, the daughter of Peter's sister Alice, and the great-granddaughter and great-niece to the Mad Hatter and Captain Hook respectively.
- Wendy – A 2020 American fantasy drama film directed by Benh Zeitlin, from a screenplay by Zeitlin and Eliza Zeitlin. The film stars Devin France, Yashua Mack, Gage Naquin, Gavin Naquin, Ahmad Cage, Krzysztof Meyn, and Romyri Ross. It is a re-imagining of J. M. Barrie's Peter Pan.
- Peter Pan & Wendy – Actress Ever Anderson, daughter of film director Paul W. S. Anderson and actress Milla Jovovich, plays Wendy in the live-action Disney film, which adapts some elements from the 1953 animated film.
- Peter Pan's Neverland Nightmare – Megan Placito portrays Wendy as the main protagonist. In a horror-themed version of the original book, she attempts to rescue her younger brother Michael, who has been kidnapped by Peter Pan.

==== Animation ====
Wendy Darling as portrayed in Disney's Peter Pan.

- Peter Pan (1953 animated film) – Kathryn Beaumont. Disney's Wendy is portrayed as being a mother first and foremost, with all the classical ideas of how to be a mother and care for people. She appears bossy but well-meaning, and slightly taken with Peter. Like her original character in the novel, she cares about Peter and about her brothers' well-being. She also appears at the Walt Disney Parks and Resorts as a meetable character alternating between Fantasyland and Adventureland.
- Return to Never Land (2002 animated film) – Kath Soucie. A sequel to 1953's Peter Pan, where a grown-up Wendy has married a man named Edward and has raised her children on tales of Peter Pan. Her role is minimal in this portrayal, but at the end of the film she is briefly, but happily, reunited with Peter after many years when he brings her daughter Jane home, Wendy assuring Peter that she hasn't changed where it matters and having a brief flight thanks to Tinker Bell.
- Tinker Bell (2008 animated film) – America Young. In Tinker Bell, Wendy is shown as the recipient of a long-forgotten ballerina music box that Tinker Bell has repaired. Being a prequel to 1953's Peter Pan, Wendy is much younger in appearance.

=== In television ===
==== Live-action ====
- In the first two telecasts of the 1954 Broadway musical version of the play (1955 and 1956), Wendy was portrayed by Kathleen Nolan, who had also played her onstage. In the 1960 telecast of the musical, Ms. Nolan was replaced by Maureen Bailey, whose only major television role this was. In the 2014 telecast, Peter Pan Live!, Wendy was played by Taylor Louderman.
- In the 1976 musical version in which Mia Farrow played Peter, Wendy was played by Briony McRoberts.
- In the 2011 web series Wendy, Wendy is played by Meaghan Martin.
- Wendy was a recurring character in the second and third seasons of Once Upon a Time, portrayed by Freya Tingley. In the series, she was born in the late nineteenth century in the Land Without Magic, but spent over a hundred years in Neverland as Pan's prisoner, a fate from which she was freed by the show's heroes.
- In ITV's 2015 film Peter & Wendy, Wendy is played by Hazel Doupe.

==== Animation ====
- A black-haired Wendy was portrayed by Christina Lange in Fox's Peter Pan and the Pirates without a British accent and wearing a crown of flowers in her short hair.
- The Disney version of Wendy was featured as one of the guests in House of Mouse; however, despite the fact that Kathryn Beaumont was credited as providing Wendy's voice, Wendy said nothing.
- The Disney version of Wendy is featured in a special episode in Jake and the Never Land Pirates, voiced by Maia Mitchell.
- Wendy Darling appeared as an adult in the second season of World of Winx as head of an orphanage in London. She was tracked down by the Winx Club, who told her that they needed to find Peter Pan. Although she was unaware of his whereabouts since he had left her, she gave the six fairies a letter that revealed that he had a son named Matt.

=== In literature ===
- In the Peter and the Starcatchers series, Wendy Darling is the daughter of Molly Aster, whom Peter has encountered while first discovering Neverland.
- Wendy appears in Jonathan Green's gamebook Neverland: Here Be Monsters! as a playable character. This version of her is a passenger on the Titanic who is inadvertently set adrift amidst the ship's sinking, and arrives at a Neverland populated by dinosaurs.

=== In anime and manga ===
- In the anime series Peter Pan no Boken (Adventures of Peter Pan), which is a part of the World Masterpiece Theater, a rather tomboyish, adventurous Wendy with a heart of gold has a pivotal role in the second part of the series, which depicts a completely original story where Peter Pan, the Lost Kids and the Darling siblings must save a young witch named Luna from the clutches of her evil grandmother, the witch Sinistra, and Wendy is the one who truly saves her. She is also shown directly defying Hook when he kidnaps her in the first part, yelling at him, kicking him and even impersonating his mother at some point to manipulate his fears against him.

=== In music ===
- The Wendy Trilogy, a feminist-minded retelling of the Peter Pan story as a three-song cycle, shows Wendy accepting, rather than refusing, Captain Hook's offer to make her a pirate, and subsequently becoming mistress of the Jolly Roger.
- Somewhere in Neverland, a song by the American rock band All Time Low where she and Peter Pan are used as metaphors for the song's narrator not wanting to grow up.
- In Taylor Swift's song "cardigan", the lyric "Tried to change the ending / Peter losing Wendy" refers to the idea of Peter Pan, the boy who never grows up, eventually losing Wendy Darling, the girl who accompanies him on his adventures in Neverland, because she decides to grow up. Wendy and Peter are used as a metaphor for the characters in Swift's album, folklore, James and Betty. This imagery is used to explain that James (who would be playing the part of Peter in this analogy) lost Betty (who would be playing the part of Wendy) because he refused to grow up and be the person she needed him to be and take accountability for his mistake.

=== In video games ===
- The Disney version of Wendy is featured in the video game Kingdom Hearts (like in the film, being also voiced by Kathryn Beaumont). In the game, Captain Hook believes she is a Princess of Heart and is displeased when it turns out she is not. She also appears in the next game, Kingdom Hearts: Chain of Memories.
- The Disney version of Wendy appears as a playable character in the video game Disney Magic Kingdoms, being unlocked during the progress of the game's main storyline.

=== In comic and graphic novel ===
- In Alan Moore and Melinda Gebbie's adult graphic novel Lost Girls, first published in full in 2006, Wendy is re-imagined as a middle-aged woman who (in an encounter with Oz's Dorothy and Wonderland's Alice) recounts her sexual encounters with a local homeless boy who represents the "real" Peter Pan. The graphic novel faced disapproval from Great Ormond Street Hospital, which denied permission to publish the book in the European Union while their copyright was still in force (through 2007).
- In the 2005–2006 comic book series The Oz/Wonderland Chronicles, Wendy is portrayed as sharing an apartment with Alice from Alice In Wonderland, Dorothy Gale from The Wonderful Wizard of Oz and Susan Pevensie from The Chronicles of Narnia.

=== Non-fiction ===
- Dan Kiley's book, The Wendy Dilemma (1984), advises women romantically involved with "Peter Pans" how to improve their relationships. This book is a sequel to The Peter Pan Syndrome: Men Who Have Never Grown Up, about individuals (usually male) with underdeveloped maturity.
