= Cara Jade Myers =

Native American actress

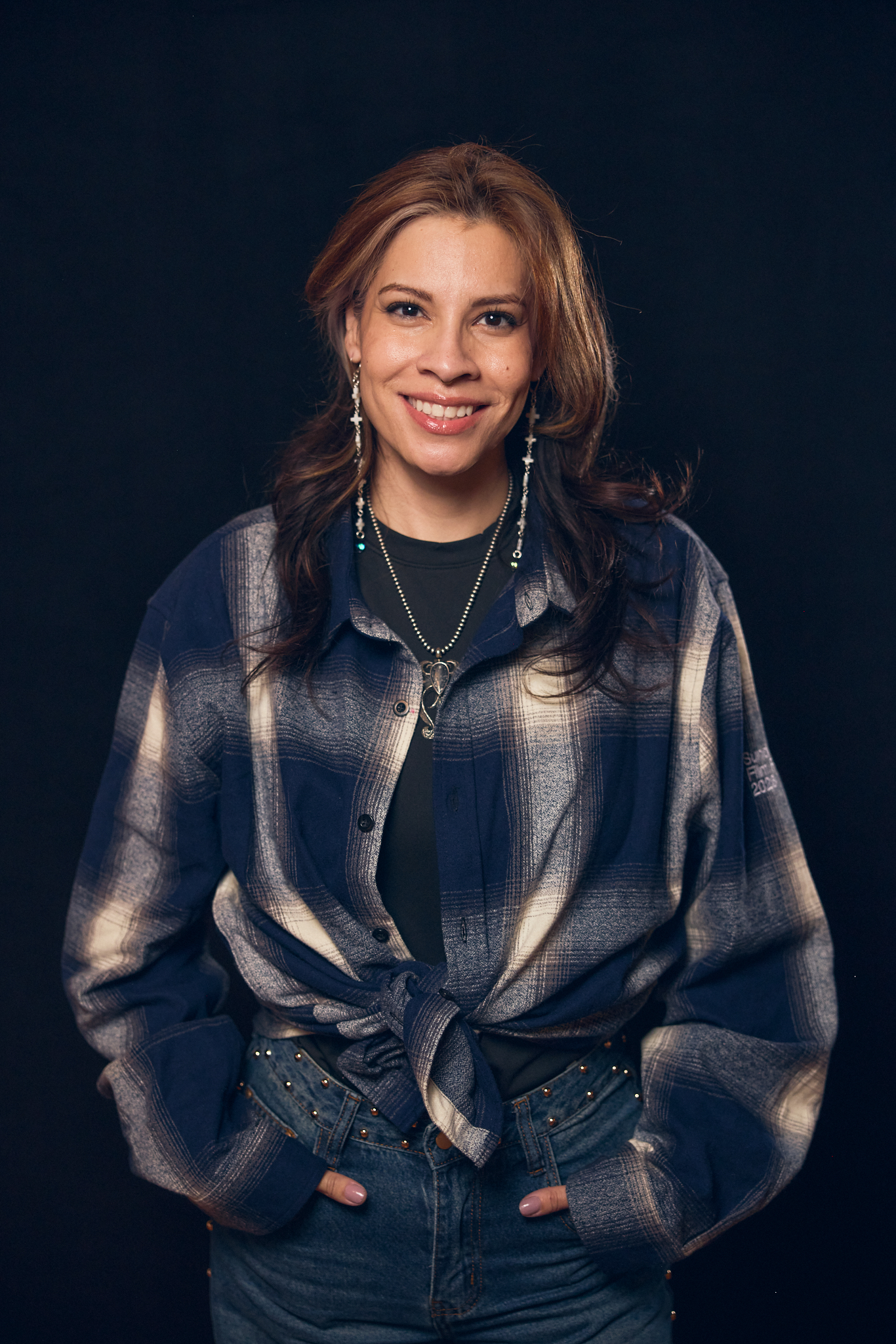
- Cara Jade Myers at the WikiPortraits studio at the 2026 Sundance Film Festival
- Born: September 1985 (age 40–41); Phoenix, Arizona
- Website: Official website

Cara Jade Myers is an American actress and writer known for her breakout performance in Martin Scorsese's Killers of the Flower Moon (2023). She is an enrolled citizen of the Wichita and Affiliated Tribes and a Kiowa descendant.

== Early life ==
Born in Phoenix, Arizona, Myers was raised in Prescott Valley. Her mother is Sharon Campbell (Wichita), and her father is Bennett Hill (Kiowa). Cara is an enrolled citizen of the Wichita and Affiliated Tribes. She has written that her parents "were alcoholics and drug addicts with undiagnosed and untreated mental health issues."

Originally interested in Egyptology and astronomy in college, she found herself fascinated by theater and acting.

== Career ==
In 2011, Myers moved to Los Angeles with her husband, Josh. That year she was a semi-finalist in the ABC/Disney writer's program. She took many behind-the-scenes jobs to learn about various aspects of filmmaking. She also has had some roles in TV series.

Myers has continued to write. Early in 2020, she was one of twelve people selected for the A3 Artist Agency’s "The Colony" program.

Myers was also chosen as a 2020 fellow in the Native American Feature Film Writers Lab. She has worked with the Native American Media Alliance to teach classes to youth on reservations in writing and filmmaking.

She is known for her performance as Anna Brown, one of four sisters in an Osage family under siege in director Martin Scorsese's Killers of the Flower Moon (2023).

== Filmography ==
=== Film ===
Year	Title	Role	Notes
2014	Jersey Boys	Bar Room Dancer	Uncredited
2020	Proximity	Waitress	
2023	Killers of the Flower Moon	Anna Brown	
2023	Wildfire: The Legend of the Cherokee Ghost Horse	Shari Nichols	
2025	Day of Reckoning	Emily Rusk	
2025	Icefall	Ani	
2026	How We Stand		
TBA	Midnight in the Orange Grove	Dr. Anna Nobel	Post-production

=== Television ===
Year	Title	Role	Notes
2011	NorthSiders	Sinova	Episode #1.1
2013	Dark Secrets	Performer	Episode: "Monster of Matagalpa"
2019	This Is Us	Officer Jorgenson	Episode: "So Long, Marianne"
2021	Rutherford Falls	Lori	Episode: "Skoden"

== Awards and honors ==
She was named one of Variety's "10 Actors to Watch" for 2023.
