= Canadian Art Song Project =

Canadian contemporary classical music group

- Abbreviation: CASP
- Established: 2011
- Founders: Lawrence Wiliford, Steven Philcox
- Registration no.: 837426089RR0001
- Legal status: Registered charity
- Location(s): Toronto, Canada
- Fields: Music commissioning, music performance, music production
- Key people: Linda Hutcheon
- Funding: Canada Council for the Arts, Ontario Arts Council, Jackman Humanities Institute Program for the Arts, Roger D. Moore
- Website: canadianartsongproject.ca

The Canadian Art Song Project (CASP) is a group that performs, records, promotes, and commissions the composition of Canadian vocal music in the tradition of art song and song cycles. The contemporary classical music group is based in Toronto and was founded by Lawrence Wiliford and Steven Philcox in 2011.

== History ==
In 2007, after the sudden death of the General Director of the Canadian Opera Company (COC), Richard Bradshaw, Wiliford and Liz Upchurch, Music Director of the COC Ensemble Studio, organized a commission in Bradshaw's honour from British-Canadian composer Derek Holman. The resulting work was a song cycle, Four Seasons, which premiered at the new Four Seasons Centre in the spring of 2009. Philcox was in the audience, and described the experience as having had "a profound impact" on him. Wiliford subsequently approached Philcox with a proposal for an organization to promote Canadian art song, leading to the founding of CASP in 2011.

== Activity ==
CASP has commissioned Canadian composers including James Rolfe, Christos Hatzis, Ana Sokolović, and Cecilia Livingston, Canadian poets including Anne Michaels, André Alexis, and Christian Bök, and performed and recorded with Canadian classical singers including Measha Brueggergosman, Brett Polegato, Krisztina Szabó, and Emily D'Angelo. Since 2022, CASP has also begun producing short film projects based on their commissions and prior Canadian art song repertoire.
