= Cecilia Livingston =

Canadian opera composer

- Born: Toronto
- Education: The Royal Conservatory of Music, University of Toronto (B.Mus, M.Mus, DMA), King’s College London (Postdoctoral Fellow in Music)
- Years active: 2013–present
- Era: Contemporary
- Known for: Opera, orchestral music
- Title: Composer-in-residence, Canadian Opera Company (COC, 2022–present) Glyndebourne Opera (2019-2022)
- Predecessor: Ian Cusson (COC)
- Board member of: Canadian League of Composers (VP, 2016–present), Canadian Music Centre (2018–present), Modern Language Association, Opera & Musical Performance Executive Committee
- Website: cecilialivingston.com

Cecilia Livingston is a Canadian composer of opera and orchestral music. She is composer-in-residence at the Canadian Opera Company, and was composer-in-residence at Glyndebourne Opera.

A profile in Opera Canada headlined Livingston as "a true storyteller" in new opera. Her work has drawn comparisons from reviewers and musicologists to both Missy Mazzoli and Jeanine Tesori, the first two female composers commissioned by the Metropolitan Opera, and to Benjamin Britten. A cover story for La Scena Musicale concluded that "the range of Livingston's achievements is undeniable."

== Early life and education ==
Livingston was born in Toronto and educated at The Royal Conservatory of Music and the University of Toronto’s Faculty of Music, studying composition with R. Murray Schafer and Christos Hatzis (a student of Morton Feldman at Eastman), and winning SSHRC CGS-M and CGS-D graduate scholarships.

During her graduate studies, Livingston joined Tapestry Opera’s 2013 Composer-Librettist Laboratory (LibLab), composing opera scenes with various librettists, including Morris Panych, Nicolas Billon, and David Yee. Three of these early Livingston opera scenes, two written for Krisztina Szabó, were singled out in a review for The Globe and Mail as exemplary new opera written in “a tradition of creative imagination being brought to bear on the human condition… that Mozart would have recognized instantly.”

That same year, Livingston received her first opera commission, from indie producer Opera 5, for an adaptation of Edgar Allan Poe's "The Masque of the Red Death" with chamber orchestra, soloists, and choir. Livingston’s chamber opera Masque premiered in a three-show run in October 2013, on a triple bill with Debussy and Daniel Pinkham. A review by John Terauds, classical music critic for the Toronto Star, noted the work of “young Toronto composer Cecilia Livingston” as “the highlight of the evening,” describing her opera’s music as “Kurt Weill-meets-Tin Pan Alley” that “bounced and bubbled and slithered along beguilingly,” and particularly praising her writing for bass and baritone, and for the voices in ensemble.

In 2014, Livingston was selected for Bang On a Can’s Summer Music Festival, where she studied with Steve Reich and David Lang, and composed and premiered Troy for percussion quartet and Noyade for orchestra. (Noyade was subsequently given its Canadian premiere by conductor Gemma New.) Livingston would go on to study with Reich again through Soundstreams’ Emerging Composer Workshop.

She received a doctorate in composition from the University of Toronto in 2015, defending her compositional thesis Azure for orchestra, winning a SSHRC Talent Postdoctoral Award and going on to become Postdoctoral Fellow in Music at King’s College London.

== Career ==
After graduating, Livingston took up a two-year composition residency in Brooklyn with American Opera Projects, winning the Canadian Music Centre’s Emerging Composer Award and an inaugural Prix 3 Femmes prize from Mécénat Musica for “extraordinary promise in the field of opera creation.” She was also commissioned by Nuit Blanche Toronto, for a multimedia installation at Queen's Park, and by the Toronto Symphony Orchestra (TSO).

In 2019, Livingston was appointed composer-in-residence at Glyndebourne Opera, a post she held concurrently with her Postdoctoral Fellowship in Music at King's College London, becoming the first Canadian composer to be performed at Glyndebourne. She was also commissioned by Tafelmusik Baroque Orchestra, and her music was performed by the London Philharmonic Orchestra, and featured on the 2020 Juno Awards Classical Album of the Year.

During the COVID-19 pandemic, British opera director Tim Albery devised an operatic collaboration between Livingston and Donna McKevitt, about the life and work of Derek Jarman, to be produced by Soundstreams as a film for its digital platforms. Garden of Vanished Pleasures, featuring Mireille Asselin, was a finalist for OPERA America’s inaugural Awards for Digital Excellence in Opera (2022); Soundstreams then mounted a staged production, with Albery again directing. Livingston would go on to collaborate with Albery again on mark, an oratorio on the art of Mark Rothko, also commissioned by Soundstreams. The premiere was directed by Albery and conducted by David Fallis at the new TD Music Hall in Massey Hall, paired on a program Morton Feldman’s Rothko Chapel (1971). Albery has publicly praised Livingston’s operatic imagination, describing her as more than a composer, but also “a true woman of the theatre.”

A 2021 CBC Music feature on new opera noted the originality of Livingston’s body of work, identifying her as a rare example of “a female composer holding space in a male-dominated field.” The following summer, she joined the faculty of the Banff Centre for Arts and Creativity’s Opera in the 21st Century program.

In 2022, after the conclusion of her residency at Glyndebourne, the Canadian Opera Company announced Livingston’s appointment as their new composer-in-residence, succeeding Ian Cusson, and making her the first woman in that role at Canada’s national opera company.

Her orchestral song cycle Breath Alone, written for Hera Hyesang Park with poetry by Anne Michaels, was premiered by Park at Carnegie Hall in 2023, and recorded for Park's Deutsche Grammophon album Breathe at Teatro Carlo Felice with their resident orchestra, conducted by Jochen Rieder. Deutsche Grammophon then produced a film of Park’s performance for their Digital Stage (now DG Stage+) platform, recorded at Teatro Colón. Livingston’s music has also been recorded for Deutsche Grammophon by Emily D'Angelo, winning a Juno Award for Classical Album of the Year and the 2025 OPUS KLASSIK Award for her album freezing, and performed by D’Angelo and Park in concert at the Kennedy Center, the Barbican Centre, the Park Avenue Armory, and Koerner Hall, among others. (Canada's National Arts Centre subsequently commissioned Livingston to create a set of orchestrations of classical art song, which were premiered by the National Arts Centre Orchestra, conducted by Alexander Shelley.) A review of Park's album in the American Record Guide noted Livingston’s music for her “magical intertwining” of orchestra and voice. A review in Gramophone by Welsh composer and musicologist Pwyll ap Siôn observed that the most striking moments on D’Angelo’s album belonged to opera composers Livingston and Jeanine Tesori, comparing them as creators of “larger operatic works,” and praising Livingston for her “magical weblike melodies” and the “arresting and strangely alluring” effects of her music.

In 2024, Livingston was an invited contributor to the Cambridge Companion to Composition, alongside Nico Muhly, Liza Lim, Howard Skempton, and Julian Anderson. Her chapter concerned adaptation in opera, examining Britten's Peter Grimes and Chris Cerrone's Invisible Cities as operatic case studies.

That same year, the University of Toronto commissioned a new opera from Livingston, to be conducted by Sandra Horst, as part of the celebrations for the 80th anniversary of their Faculty of Music’s Opera Division in 2026. The commission was additionally supported through funding from the university’s Roger D. Moore Distinguished Visitor in Composition, a post previously held by Reich, Krysztof Penderecki, and Ana Sokolovic.

She subsequently received the 2024 Louis Applebaum Composers Award, given that year in recognition of “excellence for a body of work in the field of composition for theatre, music theatre, dance or opera.” The awarding jury concluded that Livingston had already, in barely a decade of professional activity as a composer, “made a profound contribution to contemporary opera in Canada and around the world.”

== In opera scholarship ==
In addition to her work as a composer of opera, Livingston is also active in academic research on opera, particularly 20th and 21st century opera.

Beyond her invited chapter on operatic adaptation in the Cambridge Companion to Composition, she has been published in Tempo, The Opera Quarterly, and the Cambridge Opera Journal, and has presented papers at the International Conference on Music Since 1900 (ICMSN) at the University of Glasgow, the Royal Musical Association (RMA) annual conference at the University of Liverpool, the RMA Music & Philosophy Conference at King’s College London, the International Conference on Music and Minimalism at Cardiff University, the American Musicological Society (AMS) annual conferences in San Antonio and Chicago, and the Modern Language Association (MLA) annual conference in San Francisco.

As a graduate student, Livingston was a member of the Operatics Working Group in the Jackman Humanities Institute at the University of Toronto, along with Dylan Robinson.

From 2017 to 2018, she was a Visiting Research Fellow at King’s College London, supervised by opera scholar Roger Parker.

After presenting her paper at the MLA annual conference in 2023, Livingston was appointed to the MLA Opera and Musical Performance Forum Executive Committee, succeeding Linda Hutcheon. She chaired the Opera and Musical Performance session at the 2025 MLA annual conference, titled “Horizons of Musical Adaptation.”
