= Peter McGillivray =

Canadian opera singer

- Born: July 8, 1976 (age 50); Prince Albert, Saskatchewan, Canada
- Occupation: Opera singer (baritone)
- Years active: 2003–present
- Website: petermcgillivray.com

Peter McGillivray is a Canadian operatic baritone and winner of the 2003 CBC/Radio-Canada Young Performers Competition. Born in Prince Albert, Saskatchewan, he was raised in Newmarket, Ontario and attended the University of Toronto.

== Education and training ==
An alumnus of the University of Toronto Faculty of Music's Opera Division, he made his debut with the Canadian Opera Company in 2003 as a member of the Ensemble Studio training program. His primary vocal instructors were the Canadian soprano Lynn Blaser and Welsh mezzo-soprano Patricia Kern.

McGillivray graduated from Huron Heights Secondary School in Newmarket, Ontario

== Career ==
McGillivray has performed Dr. Bartolo in Rossini's Barber of Seville with companies such as Opera Lyra Ottawa, Pacific Opera Victoria, Opera de Québec and Calgary Opera. He is a collaborator with Toronto's Tapestry Opera, premiering works such as Andrew Staniland's Dark Star Requiem, Omar Daniel's The Shadow and the Dora Award-winning production of Gareth Williams' Rocking Horse Winner, and adaptation of the short story by D.H Lawrence. Recent years have also seen him perform with Edmonton Opera and Vancouver Opera as Don Magnifico in Cinderella, with Dallas Opera as Stubb in Jake Heggie's Moby Dick, and with both Opéra de Québec and Saskatoon Opera as Sharpless in Puccini's Madama Butterfly.

== Awards ==
Year	Competition	Location	Pianist	Prize
2002	Eckhardt-Gramatté National Music Competition	Brandon, Manitoba	Amanda Johnston	Second Prize Best Performance of Commissioned Piece
2003	Lotta Lenya Competition	Rochester, New York	Kristian Bezuidenhout	Second Prize
2003	CBC/Radio-Canada Young Performers Competition	Calgary, Alberta	Elizabeth Bergmann	First Prize Jean A. Chalmers Award National Arts Centre "People's Choice" Award
2004	Robert Schumann International Competition for Pianists and Singers	Zwickau, Germany	Stacey Bartsch	Third Prize
2005	Montreal International Musical Competition	Montreal, Quebec	Liz Upchurch	Second Prize Jean A. Chalmers Award for Best Canadian Candidate
2005	Queen Sonja International Music Competition	Oslo, Norway	Gunnar Flagstad	Second Prize
2006	Internationaler Kammermusikwettbewerb Franz Schubert und die Musik der Moderne	Graz, Austria	Stacey Bartsch	Second Prize

== Discography ==
Albums
Year	Title	Performers	Composers
2010	Summer Schemes	Peter McGillivray, baritone & Liz Upchurch, piano	Brahms, Debussy, Vaughan Williams, Gurney, Warlock, Finzi, Quilter, Butterworth, Britten, Ives
2016	Cloud Light: The Songs of Norbert Palej	Jacqueline Woodley, soprano; Michele Bogdanowicz, mezzo-soprano; Lawrence Wiliford, tenor; Peter McGillivray, baritone; Steven Philcox, piano	Norbert Palej
2016	Dark Star Requiem*	Neema Bickersteth, soprano; Krisztina Szabo, mezzo-soprano; Peter McGillivray, baritone; Marcus Nance, bass; Elmer Iseler Singers; Gryphon Trio; Ryan Scott & Mark Duggan, percussion; Wayne Strongman, conductor	Andrew Staniland

*Nominated for a Juno award
