= Patricia Kern =

Welsh opera singer

- Born: Patricia Kern; 14 July 1927; Swansea, Wales
- Died: 19 October 2015 (aged 88); Toronto, Ontario
- Occupations: mezzo-soprano and voice teacher
- Spouse: David Smukler
- Children: Nadya Smukler-Lawson
- Parent(s): Clifford James Kern, Doris Hilday (née Boyle)

Patricia Kern (14 July 1927 – 19 October 2015) was a British mezzo-soprano and voice teacher.

== Early years ==
Patricia Kern was born in Swansea, Wales, the only daughter of a master shipwright, Clifford James Kern, and Doris Hilday (née Boyle). Patricia started her music career as a child star in cabarets and concerts at the age of five, wearing top hats and tails. During the Great Depression, Patricia became the family's chief breadwinner when her father lost his job.

== Singing career ==
From 1949 to 1952, Kern studied with Gwynn Parry Jones at the Guildhall School of Music and Drama, London. She began her career with Opera for All (1952–1955). In 1959, Kern joined Sadler's Wells, making her début in Rusalka, and remained as a member of the company for ten seasons. She was noted for interpretations of La Cenerentola, Rosina (The Barber of Seville), Isolier (Le comte Ory) and Isabella (L'italiana in Algeri). Her other roles included Iolanthe, Hänsel, Cherubino, Pippo, and Josephine in the premiere of Malcolm Williamson's The Violins of Saint-Jacques (1966). She made her Covent Garden debut in 1967 as Zerlina. Her American début was at Washington, D.C., in 1969 and in 1987 she sang Marcellina in Chicago. In the early part of her career she was a noted oratorio singer – especially Handel.

Kern made her debut with Scottish Opera in 1969 in Rossini's La Cenerentola, a production by Colin Graham whose cast included the baritone Ian Wallace. She made her Canadian Opera Company debut in 1973 in Rossini's The Barber of Seville. This was followed by Claudio Monteverdi's L'incoronazione di Poppea, in 1983, and Benjamin Britten's Albert Herring, in 1991.

Kern's voice was light but crystal clear with a fine capacity, especially for coloratura roles and arias. Kern once remarked:

"I really was a contralto. I started to exercise the voice a little more floridly, and the voice really started to travel up very easily. As a result, most of my time was spent in the higher, lighter mezzo range."

Kern's stage personality was described as 'engaging and sympathetic'.

She made several recordings, including Massenet's Manon (1990) and Monteverdi's Madrigals (1998).

== Teaching career ==
In 1980, Kern was appointed adjunct professor of voice at the University of Toronto Faculty of Music, where she taught for more than 20 years. Her pupils included James Westman, Russell Braun, Brett Polegato, Jean Stilwell, and Kimberly Barber as well as Phillip Addis and Peter McGillivray

== Death ==
Kern died at a palliative care facility in Toronto on 19 October 2015 at the age of 88.
