= James Westman =

Canadian opera singer (born 1971)

- Born: James Westman; 16 September 1972 (age 54); Stratford, Ontario
- Occupation: Opera singer (baritone)
- Years active: 1983 – present

James Westman (born September 16, 1971) is a Canadian operatic baritone known for his interpretation of the Verdi, Puccini and bel canto operatic repertoire, and particularly his signature role of Germont in La traviata, which he has sung in over 150 performances, with opera companies such as San Francisco Opera, Houston Grand Opera, Pittsburgh Opera, Florida Grand Opera, Graz Opera, Santa Fe Opera, Chicago Lyric Opera, Opéra de Montréal, Los Angeles Opera, Grand Théâtre de Bordeaux, Canadian Opera Company, Boston Lyric Opera, Cologne Opera, Vancouver Opera, English National Opera, San Diego Opera, Dallas Opera, Utah Opera, and Opera Theatre of St. Louis. On January 29, 2011 Westman created the lead role of Sandy Keith In the world premiere of Bramwell Tovey's The Inventor. In 2017 he played Sir John A. MacDonald in Harry Somers's Louis Riel for the Canadian Opera Company's tribute to Canada's 150th celebrations. As a recitalist, he has performed for the Marilyn Horne Foundation, Aldeburgh Connection, Aldeburgh Festival, Musikverein, Wigmore Hall, Queen Elizabeth Hall, Morgan Library & Museum, Koerner Hall, Carnegie Hall, Saito Kinen Festival in Japan, Stratford Summer Music, British Broadcasting Corporation, and the Canadian Broadcasting Corporation. Westman first came to attention at the age of twelve when he was the first boy soprano to perform and record Mahler 4th Symphony with Benjamin Zander and the Boston Philharmonic Orchestra in 1984. Westman is regularly featured as the Anthem singer for the Toronto Maple Leafs and numerous other NHL franchises. Four of Westman's recordings have been nominated for a Juno Award. Two recordings nominated for a Grammy Award.

== Education and early career ==
Westman was raised on a farm near St. Marys, Ontario, Canada. He studied with several early musical training institutions such as St. Marys Children's Choir, Vienna Boys Choir, Petits chanteurs de Sainte-Croix de Neuilly(Paris Boys Choir), and the American Boychoir School. He attended the University of Toronto Opera Division where he received a Master's degree in Operatic Performance, studying under Lois Marshall and Patricia Kern. He was a member of the Canadian Opera Company ensemble studio, and studied at the Britten-Pears Young Artist Programme in Aldeburgh, and the Tanglewood Music Center. He participated in San Francisco Opera's Merola Opera Program and was one of the company's Adler Fellows. As a baritone Westman has won several international voice competitions; Marilyn Horne Foundation, Licia Albanese Foundation, D'angelo Competition, Jeunes Ambassadeurs Lyrique. In June 1999 he was a finalist and audience favourite at the Cardiff Singer of the World Competition.

== Recordings ==
- Britten: War Requiem – Christine Goerke, Anthony Dean Griffey James Westman; Saito Kinen Orchestra, Japan; Seiji Ozawa (conductor). Label: Decca.
- Donizetti: Imelda de' Lambertazzi – Nicole Cabell, James Westman, Frank Lopardo, Massimo Giordano; Orchestra of the Age of Enlightenment; Mark Elder (conductor). Label: Opera Rara.
- Ricci: Corrado d'Altamura (Highlights) – Dimitra Theodossiou, Dimitry Korchak, James Westman; Philharmonia Orchestra; Roland Böer (conductor). Label: Opera Rara.
- Harry Somers, A Midwinter Night's Dream, - Canadian Children's Opera Chorus Label: CBC Records.
- Margison Sings Verdi, Richard Margison, James Westman Canadian Opera Company; Richard Bradshaw (conductor). Label: CBC Records.
- Millennium Opera Gala: Roy Thomson Hall, - Canadian Opera Company; Richard Bradshaw (conductor). Label: CBC Records.
- Angel Choir: St. Marys Children's Choir, Eileen Baldwin (conductor).
- The Aldeburgh 20th Anniversary Collection: Stephen Ralls and Bruce Ubukata, Piano. Glenn Gould Studios (CBC), December 9, 1997.
- Les Sept Paroles du Christ, Dubois: - James Westman, Janet Obermeyor, Greg Carpenter, Chris Dawes; Gentlemen and Boys of Cathedral Church of St. James (Toronto), Giles Bryant (conductor). October, 1994.
- Jamie Westman - Boy Treble: John Wood, Piana and Organ. Label: King Records, 1984.

== Sources ==
- Driscoll, F Paul "Sound Bites: James Westman", Opera News, February 2004, Vol 68, No. 8. Accessed 12 May 2009.
- Gereben, Janos, "Young Canadians in SF Symphony's POPera" (review), San Francisco Classical Voice, 27 July 2004. Accessed 12 May 2009.
- Marilyn Horne Foundation, Special Projects. Accessed 12 May 2009.
- So, Joseph, "Baritone James Westman makes good on the promise of a leading boy soprano", Opera Canada, 22 March 1998. Accessed 12 May 2009.
- So, Joseph, "Baritone James Westman In Recital" (review), La Scena Musicale, 19 November 2001. Accessed 12 May 2009.
