= Kimberly Barber =

Canadian opera singer

- Born: 21 December 1959 (age 66); Guelph, Ontario, Canada
- Genres: classical, musical theatre
- Occupations: Singer, teacher
- Instrument: Voice (Mezzo-soprano)

Kimberly Barber (born December 21, 1959) is a Canadian mezzo-soprano and vocal pedagogue.

== Education ==
She studied with Patricia Kern at the University of Toronto, graduating in 1983. She received a diploma in operatic performance from the university in 1985. She began her career as a member of the Canadian Opera Company Ensemble, also in 1985.

== Career ==
While maintaining a professional opera career, she has been teaching at Wilfrid Laurier University since July 2002 and is currently Coordinator of the Opera Program there.

From 1989 to 1994, Barber sang with Oper Frankfurt in Germany.

Barber made her New York City Opera debut in 2002 as Nero in Handel's Agrippina and her Paris Opera debut as Annio in Mozart's La Clemenza di Tito.

On November 18, 2003, Barber performed in recital with fellow mezzo-soprano Frederica von Stade and pianist Steven Blier at Wilfrid Laurier University's Maureen Forrester Recital Hall.

In the 2006-2007 season, Barber created the role of Jessica in John Estacio’s opera Frobisher for Calgary Opera.

Her discography includes Ravel’s L’heure espagnole on Deutsche Grammophon under André Previn, Handel’s Rinaldo on Naxos Records and a solo disc of Handel and Hasse arias for CBC Records.
