= Tiger Lily (Peter Pan) =

Fictional character

- Peter Pan character
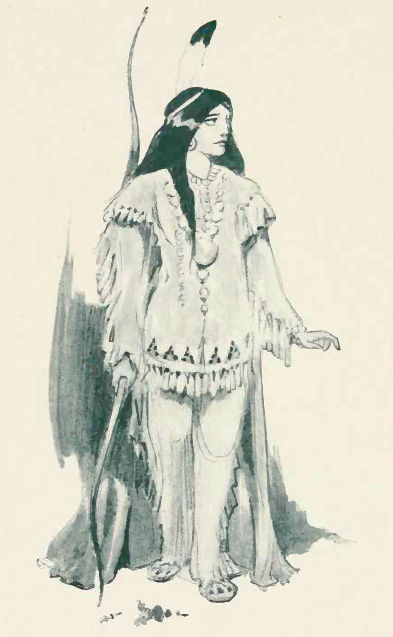
- 1907 illustration of Tiger Lily by Oliver Herford
- First appearance: Peter and Wendy (1904)
- Created by: J. M. Barrie
- Portrayed by: Miriam Nesbitt (UK first stage 1904 production); Margaret Gordon (US first 1905 production); Anna May Wong (1924 film); Carsen Gray (2003 film); Rooney Mara (Pan); Sara Tomko (Once Upon a Time); Alyssa Wapanatâhk (Peter Pan & Wendy); Olumide Olorunfemi (Peter Pan's Neverland Nightmare)
- Voiced by: Cree Summer (Peter Pan & the Pirates)

In-universe information
- Species: Human
- Gender: Female
- Family: Great Big Little Panther (father)

Tiger Lily is a fictional character in J. M. Barrie's 1904 play Peter Pan, or The Boy Who Wouldn't Grow Up, his 1911 novel Peter and Wendy, and their various adaptations.

== History ==
Tiger Lily is the daughter of Great Big Little Panther, the chief of the Piccaninny tribe, the fictional tribe of Native Americans living in Neverland. Barrie describes her as "a princess in her own right. The most beautiful of dusky Dianas and the belle of the Piccaninnies, coquettish, cold and amorous by turns." She is apparently old enough to be married, but refuses any suitors because of her feelings towards Peter. She is jealous of Wendy and Tinker Bell. Tiger Lily is kidnapped by Captain Hook and his pirates but is rescued by Peter Pan.

== In other media ==
- Tiger Lily appears in Peter Pan (1924), portrayed by Anna May Wong.
- In the 1953 Disney animated film of the same name, Captain Hook kidnaps Tiger Lily. This leads her father Big Chief to suspect that the Lost Boys were responsible. Hook leaves her to drown at Skull Rock, but she is saved by Peter. He returns Tiger Lily to her tribe. While the tribe celebrates, Wendy becomes jealous of how Tiger Lily is flirting with Peter. Unlike other females in Neverland, Tiger Lily has no hostility towards Wendy herself. In the film, she has no speaking lines (except for a brief "HELP" when she almost drowns, which is provided by an uncredited actress).
- In Cheshire Crossing, an older Tiger Lily is responsible for saving Wendy's life after she is stabbed, both having previously been romantically involved.
- In Hook, Tiger Lily is absent but is referenced when Mr. Smee mentions "the Tiger Lily incident". She was originally going to appear in the film, portrayed by Lisa Bonet in early stages of production.
- Tiger Lily appears in Peter Pan & the Pirates, voiced by Cree Summer. She and her brother Hard-to-Hit sometimes tag along with and aid their friends Peter Pan, Tinker Bell, the Darling children and the Lost Boys on their many adventures.
- In P. J. Hogan's Peter Pan (2003), she is played by Carsen Gray, who is of Haida Indigenous and mixed descent. In this version, Tiger Lily is attracted to Wendy's younger brother John.
- In the 2011 miniseries Neverland, she is portrayed as Aaya, played by Q'orianka Kilcher. Aaya means "lily of tiger" in her native language.
- Tiger Lily appears in the 2015 film Pan, portrayed by Rooney Mara. Mara's casting created controversy due to claims of whitewashing. She appears as a love interest to a younger James Hook.
- Tiger Lily appears in Once Upon a Time, portrayed by Sara Tomko. This version was initially a fairy who was the fairy godmother to a baby Rumplestiltskin and a friend of the Blue Fairy. At some point, Tiger Lily gave up her fairy wings and relocated to Neverland. Though she would later regain her wings at some point.
- She is the protagonist of the book Tiger Lily (2012) written by Jodi Lynn Anderson, told from the point of view of Tinker Bell.
- Tiger Lily appears in Jonathan Green's 2019 role-playing gamebook Neverland: Here Be Monsters! as a playable character. This version is a fierce warrior who rides a saber-toothed tiger as a steed and has proven herself in battle against the dinosaurs roaming Neverland.
- As Lily, Tiger Lily is the central character of Cynthia Leitich Smith's 2021 decolonising rewriting of Peter Pan as Sisters of the Neversea.
- Canadian Cree actress Alyssa Wapanatâhk portrays Tiger Lily in the film Peter Pan & Wendy, which premiered on Disney+ on April 28, 2023. Unlike the original film, this version of Tiger Lily has a larger role as she is shown to be friends with Peter Pan, the Lost Boys, and later the Darling children. She even calls Peter "Little Brother." Throughout the film, Tiger Lily speaks Cree in addition to English.
- As well as being accompanied by a novelisation of the film, the 2023 Disney Peter Pan & Wendy was also accompanied by the children's novel Tiger Lily and the Secret Treasure of Neverland by Métis author Cherie Dimaline. The novel attempts to counterbalance the racist representation of Tiger Lily in previous iterations of the Peter Pan story.
- Tiger Lily appears in Peter Pan's Neverland Nightmare, portrayed by Olumide Olorunfemi. This version tries to help Wendy to rescue her younger brother Michael, who has been kidnapped by Peter Pan.

== Reception ==
In modern times, the character has attracted controversy due to accusations of racism and Native American stereotyping.

Controversy has also arisen from the name given to her tribe, "Piccanniny", a term now widely interpreted as a racial slur.

The Disney animated sequel Return to Never Land (2002) avoided controversy by leaving out the Indians entirely, although Peter and Jane briefly visit her monument. The book series Peter and the Starcatchers, also commissioned by Disney, replaces the Indians with a Samoan tribe called the People of the Mollusc, with a girl named Shining Pearl serving as the analog of Tiger Lily.
