= Sisters of the Neversea =

2021 novel by Cynthia Leitich Smith

- Author: Cynthia Leitich Smith
- Language: English
- Genre: Fantasy, Children's literature
- Publisher: Heartdrum
- Publication date: June 1, 2021
- Pages: 320
- ISBN: 9780062869975

Sisters of the Neversea by Cynthia Leitich Smith (Muscogee Creek Nation) is a 2021 rewriting of J. M. Barrie's early twentieth-century children's story Peter Pan.

== Summary ==
The main characters are members of a blended family in today's Tulsa, Oklahoma: the twelve-year-old stepsisters Wendy Darling, who is white and English, and Lily Roberts, who belongs to Muscogee Creek Nation, along with their four-year-old half-brother Michael. The parents of this blended family are on the point of separating.

One night, the children are visited by the loudmouth Peter Pan and his friend Belle, a fairy. Peter asks the family to accompany him to Neverland so that Wendy can read him stories. Lily is unimpressed to be referred to as an "Injun". Wendy, enchanted by fantasy stories, agrees to go there with Michael. Lily, who is more scientifically minded, chooses not to go. But Peter accidentally leaves his shadow behind, which reveals to Lily the danger her siblings are in, and she follows it to Neverland to rescue them.

Hereafter, the focal characters of the chapters alternate between Lily and Wendy. It emerges that the tyrannical Peter kidnaps boys to play with on the island (feeding them to a crocodile when they turn thirteen) and has caused the extinction of several species there. White boys become his companions and are known as the Lost; Indigenous ones, whom Peter looks down on, serve as their playfight opponents. Whereas White captives are entranced by Belle's fairydust, the Indigenous captives come to understand the island and themselves. Lily is rescued by this ethnically diverse group of Indigenous youths, and they work to free the Lost. Meanwhile, Wendy plots her own escape, aided by Belle's decision to turn against Peter. Together, the heroes convince Peter of the error of his ways. The island's pirates are narrated as a cheerful, mutli-ethnic and multilingual group with a female captain and its merfolk as indigenes.

== Reception ==
Monica Brown characterised the novel as Smith's "most transcendent". The book has been compared with Cherie Dimaline's Into the Bright Open, a 2023 rewriting of The Secret Garden with similar themes.

In the assessment of Fiona Hartley-Kroeger, "Smith prods at the imperialist aspects of Barrie's story, laying bare the ecological destruction, racism, and misogyny that Peter's narcissism enacts on the island. [...] Though Peter's eventual remorse and path to redemption are a bit tidy, through him Smith offers the possibility of learning and change for the better". Likewise, Anna Holmes found that Smith's "most interesting move, in terms of plot, is to present Peter as an arrogant colonialist", but that Smith tended towards excessive political exposition and struggled with characterisation, objecting particularly that "Peter Pan [...] is mostly portrayed as a 'Lord of the Flies'-like monster [...] until he has a sudden change of heart, and all the destruction he's left behind is forgiven".

Kate Fleming, writing in the School Library Journal, assessed the book as being for grades 4–7 and as "a wondrous story skillfully hung on the framework of Peter Pan, but Smith makes it all her delightful own. [...] she subverts the flaws of the original story into strengths, while firmly rooting her fantasy in realistic character development [...] perfectly pitching her tone for the middle reader set". According to Kirkus Reviews, the book is suitable for ages 8–12. "Short chapters, plenty of action, and the wry voice of the omniscient narrator help make this title, with its themes of gender equity, Native pride, and environmentalism, accessible. The poignant dislocation of the Lost and the fierce familial love of the stepsisters illustrate the importance of remembering where you come from and to whom you belong."
