= Hunting by Stars =

2021 novel by Cherie Dimaline

Hunting by Stars: A Marrow Thieves Novel
- Author: Cherie Dimaline
- Language: English
- Genre: Science fiction; Dystopian
- Publisher: Penguin
- Publication date: 2021
- Publication place: Canada
- Pages: 400
- ISBN: 9780735269651

Hunting by Stars is a 2021 dystopian young adult novel by Georgian Bay Métis Canadian writer Cherie Dimaline and the sequel to her 2017 novel The Marrow Thieves. It was placed in the "honor" category for best young adult book of 2022 in the American Indian Youth Literature Awards.

== Form ==
The novel is narrated through the perspectives of several different focal characters, using chapter-breaks to shift from one perspective to another. The main focal characters are French, whose voice also dominates The Marrow Thieves and whose narrative is in the first person, and Rose, whose narrative is in the third person. A few chapters use an omniscient narratorial voice or present the back-stories of other characters, framed as stories within the story; these stories within the story are first-person.

== Summary ==
The premise of the novel is that, following a mysterious plague in a dystopian future, non-Indigenous North Americans are no longer able to dream. They can, however, recover this ability by consuming the bone marrow of Indigenous people, who are consequently hunted—especially in Canada, where the heroes live. The novel picks up from the cliffhanger ending of The Marrow Thieves.

The hero, French, wakes up imprisoned in one of the neo-residential schools. He suffers brutal torture before discovering that his brother Mitch, from whom he was separated seven years before, has been indoctrinated by the regime and is now an agent working on its behalf. Each brother now hopes to save the other. Mitch hopes to enable French to become an agent too, winning such security and prestige as the regime affords to Indigenous people. French hopes that becoming an agent will enable him and Mitch to leave the school, whereupon he can convince Mitch to abandon the regime.

Meanwhile, French's hot-headed but determined girlfriend Rose sets off from the camp of Indigenous survivors to which she and French belong in an ill-planned attempt to find and rescue French. She is accompanied by Derrick, who has fallen in love with her. Rose's incautious approach on a camp leads Derrick to sustain potentially fatal wounds from a bear-trap. Realising that Derrick may soon die, the two approach an inhabited house. They find it is home to a cult run by an Indigenous man who feeds the blood of his two-spirit nephew Nam to fawning white women in return for sex. Derrick recovers but the two are soon imprisoned and their blood is harvested.

During the imprisonment of French (in the residential school) and Rose (by the cult), the rest of their found-family decide to make use of a resistance network to flee to the USA, where a new president is trying to prevent the harvesting of Indigenous people and their bone-marrow. The family is spurred on by news that the regime is now planning to farm Indigenous children, since one of their number is pregnant.

Rose and Derrick collude with Nam to escape the cult, and the three return to the camp of Indigenous survivors. Rose discovers that her found-family have left for the USA and resolves to follow them; Nam accompanies her.

French convinces both Mitch and his captors that he has succumbed to their ideology, and is fast-tracked to becoming an agent of the regime. French learns that he will be sent to infiltrate his own found-family and expose the resistance network. To prove their commitment, the brothers are sent to entrap three Indigenous people who are travelling near the residential school. They succeed, and French struggles with the knowledge of what he has done. The brothers are then sent to intercept French's family. The brothers succeed and, realising that Mitch's commitment to the regime cannot be broken, French kills him and enables the family to escape to the USA disguised as rail freight.

Once in the USA, however, French and his family are ambushed by a group of posh white vigilante women who are disaffected by the US president's protection of Indigenous people and are determined to harvest the group's marrow for themselves and their relatives. The vigilantes imprison the family in a pool-shed. Wab, the pregnant group member, gives birth there. The vigilantes' plans are disrupted, however, by one of their number attempting to turn the family over to Canada in return for citizenship for herself and her son. The vigilantes' disorganisation allows the family to attempt an escape, which succeeds because Rose and Nam arrive in the nick of time. Grieving the loss of family members who have died but carrying a new-born child, the family successfully escapes to a relatively safe part of the USA.

The novel closes with an "epilogue/prologue" in which Rose contemplates with optimism the future that the newborn Ishkode represents.

== Author's comments ==
Dimaline has explicitly positioned both The Marrow Thieves and Hunting by Stars as a commentary on the historical colonisation of Indigenous north Americans:

They reflect people and places I know, love, and respect, and echo a very real and very dark time in our collective history. But they are still fiction from one imagination rooted in the specific community I am from and fostered by the many teachers and mentors I've had along the way. Please reach out to teachers, read other books, and find resources to learn more about the individual nations and histories, including the residential school system and Indian boarding school era in both Canada and the United States.

== Reception ==
C. S. Topaum read the novel as a leading example of "Indigenous post-apocalyse" science fiction. In Topaum's analysis, Indigenous people in North America have already experienced real apocalypse through the violence of colonisation. Unlike in fiction written from a colonialist point of view, then, rather than presenting apocalypse as a novel experience, "the post-apocalypse as a fictional landscape instead represents colonial continuity and the survivance of Indigenous peoples in a future in which we are not supposed to exist". By recontextualising the familiar tropes of apocalypse fiction, Hunting by Stars gives those tropes "a signification that speaks to Indigenous futurities, but also to Indigenous presents". The focus in Hunting by Stars on Indigenous characters who participate in the regime's violence enables Dimaline to "make it clear the degree to which colonized futurities are distinct from Indigenous futurities".

Andrea Burgos Mascarell called attention to the prominence of storytelling in the novel, arguing that "Dimaline’s stories offer an incredibly detailed and in-depth approach to storytelling as the backbone of culture and identity preservation while showcasing the equally powerful roles of narrator and listener in relation to both individual and collective trauma".
