= Cornelis Opthof =

Canadian opera singer

- Born: February 10, 1930; Rotterdam, Netherlands
- Died: December 16, 2008 (aged 78) Toronto, Ontario
- Genres: Opera
- Occupation: Singer
- Instrument: Vocals
- Formerly of: Canadian Opera Company

Cornelis Opthof (February 10, 1930 – December 16, 2008) was a Dutch-born Canadian bass-baritone who sang with the Canadian Opera Company for fifty years, its longest serving member.

== Biography ==
Opthof was born in Rotterdam in 1930 and immigrated to Canada in 1949 where he studied classical voice with Catharina Hendrikse. In 1957, he was awarded a scholarship at the Royal Conservatory of Music and, in 1959, he made his debut as Alcalde in La forza del destino with the Canadian Opera Company (where he remained a member for fifty years, performing in over 75 productions). He made his Metropolitan Opera debut in 1976, opposite Joan Sutherland as Riccardo, in I Puritani, having previously sung with her on a number of occasions which included being invited to Australia by Richard Bonynge to tour with his wife.

He made some noteworthy recordings of songs by Arnold Schoenberg with Glenn Gould as an accompanist. He also made a number of opera recordings with Joan Sutherland.

Opthof died in Toronto on December 16, 2008, and was survived by his wife Natalia and their three children.
