= Empire of Wild =

2019 novel by Cherie Dimaline

- Author: Cherie Dimaline
- Language: English
- Genre: Contemporary fantasy, Women's fiction
- Publisher: Penguin Random House Canada
- Publication date: September 15, 2020
- Publication place: Canada
- Pages: 320
- ISBN: 0-7352-7720-6

Empire of Wild is a novel by Cherie Dimaline, published on September 17, 2019, by Penguin Random House Canada.

== Synopsis ==
The novel follows a Métis woman named Joan Beausoliel as she searches for her husband, Victor, who went missing nearly a year ago in a Walmart parking lot following an argument between the two of them. She meets Reverend Eugene Wolff, a traveling preacher who bears a striking resemblance to Victor and has no memory of his past. Joan is joined by her twelve-year-old cousin Zeus as she investigates Victor's disappearance. Joan becomes convinced that a conman named Thomas Heiser is a rogaru and tries to free her husband from his control.

== Development ==
The idea for the plot of Empire of Wild came to Dimaline when she had gone to a First Nations literary event and had no material prepared for her speech. She instead told a story that her grandmother had told her about the rougarou, a creature from Métis folklore. She later read an article about missionaries coming to First Nations in Canada, and was frustrated by the thought of indigenous preachers encouraging people to give up their land for pipelines.

== Adaptations ==
An operatic adaptation of the novel, with music by Ian Cusson and libretto by Dimaline, is currently scheduled to be premiered by the Canadian Opera Company in May 2027.
