= Ian Cusson =

Canadian composer (born 1981)

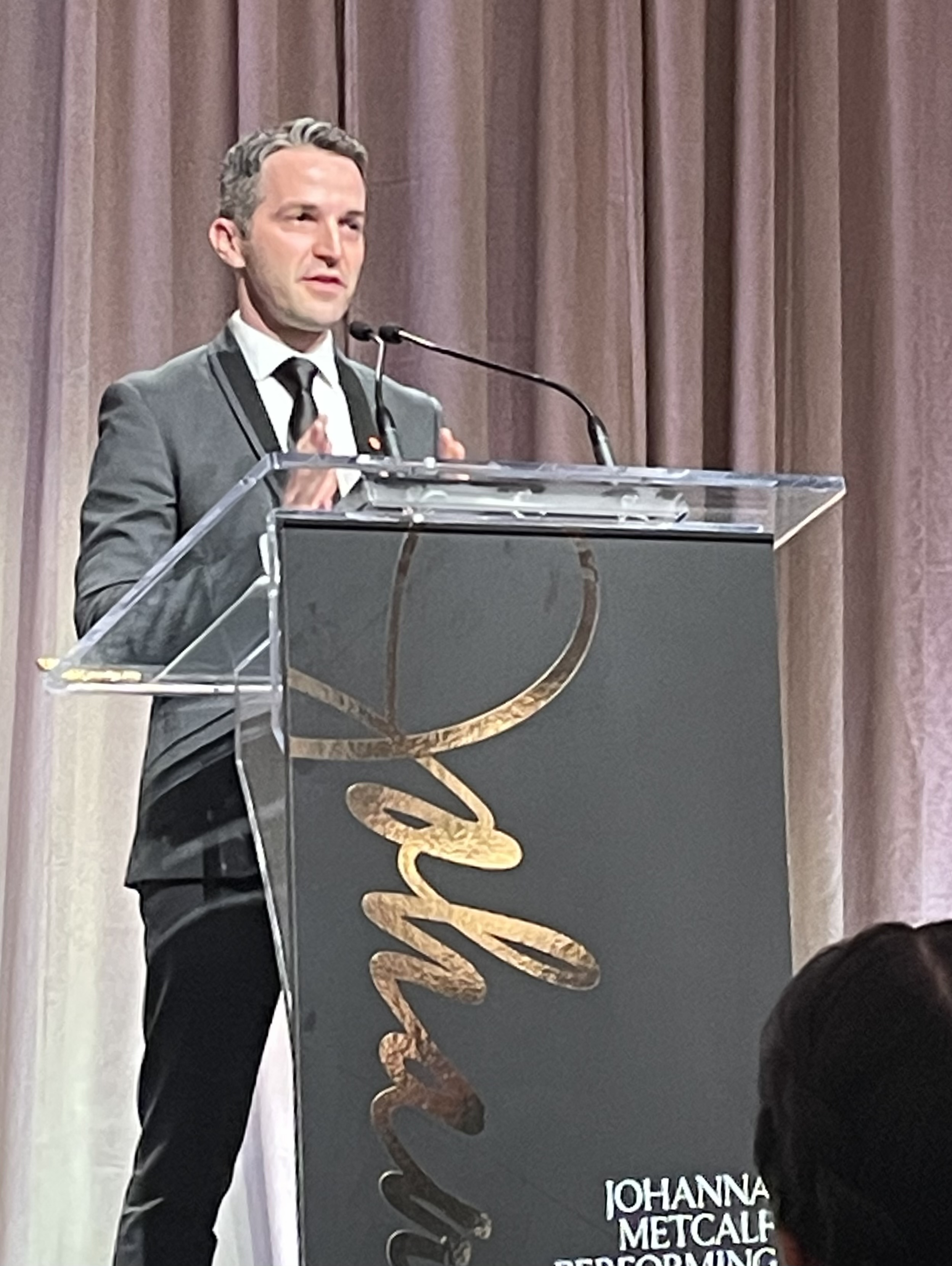
Cusson receiving the 2021 Johanna Metcalf Performing Arts Prize on May 19, 2022.

Ian Cusson (born August 24, 1981) is a Canadian composer of Georgian Bay Métis and French Canadian descent. He is known for his operas, art songs, chamber works and orchestral music.

== Career ==
Cusson came to prominence in 2017, when he was awarded one of two prestigious new Carrefour residencies for "culturally diverse or Indigenous composers" with the National Arts Centre Orchestra of Canada.

Notable operatic works include Fantasma, with text by Colleen Murphy, and Of the Sea with text by Kanika Ambrose. In 2021, Cusson was the recipient of SOCAN's Jan V. Matejcek Classical Music Award and the Johanna Metcalf Performing Arts Prize. The Canadian Opera Company and the National Arts Centre have announced that Cusson has been commissioned to compose an opera based on the novel Empire of Wild by Cherie Dimaline as part of their 2025 mainstage season.

Cusson is a member of the Canadian Opera Company's Circle of Artists, an advisory board of indigenous artists.

In late November 2025, Edmonton Opera announced the cancellation of the premiere of Cusson's forthcoming opera Indians on Vacation, after concerns were raised by local Indigenous representatives of Treaty 6 Nations about the indigeneity of Thomas King who wrote the book on which the opera was based. Shortly thereafter King acknowledged that his Cherokkoo identity was a family legend and not true.

On May 9 2026 Against the Grain Theatre produced a presentation of the work entitled Stories Don’t Die: The Artists of Indians on Vacation. This production was a result of a workshop and healing circle after which the artists who created the work wanted a path for the work to live on. The production was positively received " Stories Don’t Die made a compelling case for Indians on Vacation."

In February 2026, the COC announced their 2026-27 season including Cusson's Empire of Wild, also concerning Indigenous subjects.
