= Into the Bright Open =

2023 novel by Cherie Dimaline

Into The Bright Open is a 2023 novel by Cherie Dimaline that is a reimagining of The Secret Garden, set in Canada during 1901. The book was a finalist for the Governor General's Literary Award in the young people's category.

== Plot ==
Mary Lennox, a fifteen year old living in Toronto, is orphaned when her parents die in an accident. She is sent to live at her uncle's house, who lives near the Georgian Bay. She grows close to a Métis servant named Flora. Mary discovers that she has a cousin named Olive that is hidden in the attic due to having a "nervous condition". Their lives become more difficult when Olive's stepmother Elizabeth returns from a trip. Elizabeth arranges a French tutor as a suitor for Mary, while Olive gets sicker taking the medication prescribed to her. Mary throws herself into restoring a secret garden in her free time once she discovers the key that unlocks it and spends time with Flora's sister Sophie. The two devise a plan to help Olive fool Elizabeth into thinking she is taking the medication that is making her ill by creating a similar looking substitute.

Mary and Sophie become close friends and eventually kiss; however, they realize that their relationship would not be socially acceptable. Mary writes a letter to her uncle explaining her concerns about Olive, which Elizabeth intercepts. Elizabeth locks Mary in her room, fires Flora, and tries to get her arrested by falsely accusing her of theft. Mary warns Flora ahead of time and tells the police officers about how Olive is being poisoned by her medication, as the doctor prescribing it is Elizabeth's brother. Mary is then dismissed as being delusional. Her uncle comes home, realizes what is going on, and sends Elizabeth away. The novel ends in an epilogue that takes place a year later where they all live together happily as a family.

== Reception ==
This rendition of Mary retains her white, upper-class background, although she experiences character development where she learns to treat the household staff like family in her new home. A reviewer for the Quill and Quire believed this retelling of the tale was "refreshing". The novel was also positively reviewed for its queer themes and Métis representation by Literary Hub. The author rewrote the classic to be more relevant to a modern audience, as she disliked the casual racism from the protagonist in the original novel.

== See also ==
- Sisters of the Neversea
