= Tiger Lily and the Secret Treasure of Neverland =

2023 novel by Cherie Dimaline

- Author: Cherie Dimaline
- Language: English
- Genre: Fantasy, Children's literature
- Publisher: Disney Press
- Publication date: March 21, 2023
- Pages: 288
- ISBN: 9781368080460

Tiger Lily and the Secret Treasure of Neverland is a 2023 novel by the Georgian Bay Métis author Cherie Dimaline based on Disney's adaptations of J. M. Barrie's play and novel Peter Pan. The book's release was planned to come one month before the release of the live-action Disney film Peter Pan & Wendy; it was published in parallel to Disney's official novellisation of the film, Elizabeth Rudnick's Peter Pan & Wendy: The Junior Novelization.

== Summary ==
The protagonist is Tiger Lily, who is a thirteen-year-old Indigenous inhabitant of Neverland. A premise of the novel is that the island of Neverland has granted its Indigenous people the option to choose to grow up, making them unique among its inhabitants. Thus, Tiger Lily's uncertainty about whether to grow up is central to the novel.

At the opening of the novel, Tiger Lily finds herself too scared by a bear attacking her village to take a lead in finding a solution. Instead Peter Pan takes the most dramatic role in saving the village, leaving Tiger Lily dissatisfied with herself. Peter then leaves Neverland to visit London. However, Tiger Lily the realises that Captain Hook's pirates—whom Dimaline positions as White and who have been absent from Neverland for some time—have returned. They are seeking a reputed treasure: the secret of eternal life. They imprison Tiger Lily's friend. Tiger Lily averts the peril facing Neverland.

== Representation of indigeneity ==
Dimaline opens the novel with an author's note discussing the representation of indigeneity in the novel, implicitly because, as the School Library Journal noted, Tiger Lily is "a character historically rife with stereotypes" about North American Indigenous people. Dimaline states that

since she is Native to this particular place, writing her story and creating her beautiful community was about finding the pieces of collective Indigenous philosophy and worldview (or as close to collective as possible) without borrowing too much from the existing and distinct Indigenous Nations across Turtle Island.

Dimaline continues that "this book is not a story about Indigenous North Americans", though Taylor Worley noted that "some facets of Tiger Lily's culture, including housing (e.g., teepees) and customs (e.g. collecting sweetgrass), are recognizable nods to myriad North American Indigenous peoples". Dimaline concludes that

each Nation has their own stories and their own storytellers, and that is who should be heard and read if you are interested in Native American, Alaska Native, First Nations, Métis, and Inuit stories. This book is about Tiger Lily and her vibrant community and the ways she lives, protects, and loves her Neverland. Because Neverland has always been hers.

Kirkus Reviews, took the view that, "told from the perspective of Tiger Lily, this story reframes Disney’s retelling of J.M. Barrie’s classic. [...] Respect for animals, plants, land, and family are all central themes of Tiger Lily’s heritage."

== Reception ==
Taylor Worley found that Dimaline "provides vibrancy and substance to a chronically badly represented character [...] Ultimately, this is an enjoyable adventure that should appeal to Disney fans".

According to Cher Ptacek, the book is suitable for grade levels 3–7. She found that

the author addresses important topics that pertain to the process of maturing. She also addresses the differences between becoming an adult (getting older physically) and becoming a grown-up (a change in state of mind). The reader is carried along quickly as Lily works to save her friend and to address her own personal needs as her self-confidence and self-acceptance continue to grow.

In the assessment of Kirkus Reviews, the novel is "a lighthearted tale with substance beautifully extending the world of Neverland" and tht Tiger Lily's "conflicted feelings about leaving childhood behind will resonate".
