= La resurrezione =

Oratorio by Georg Friedrich Händel

- Oratorio by George Frideric Handel
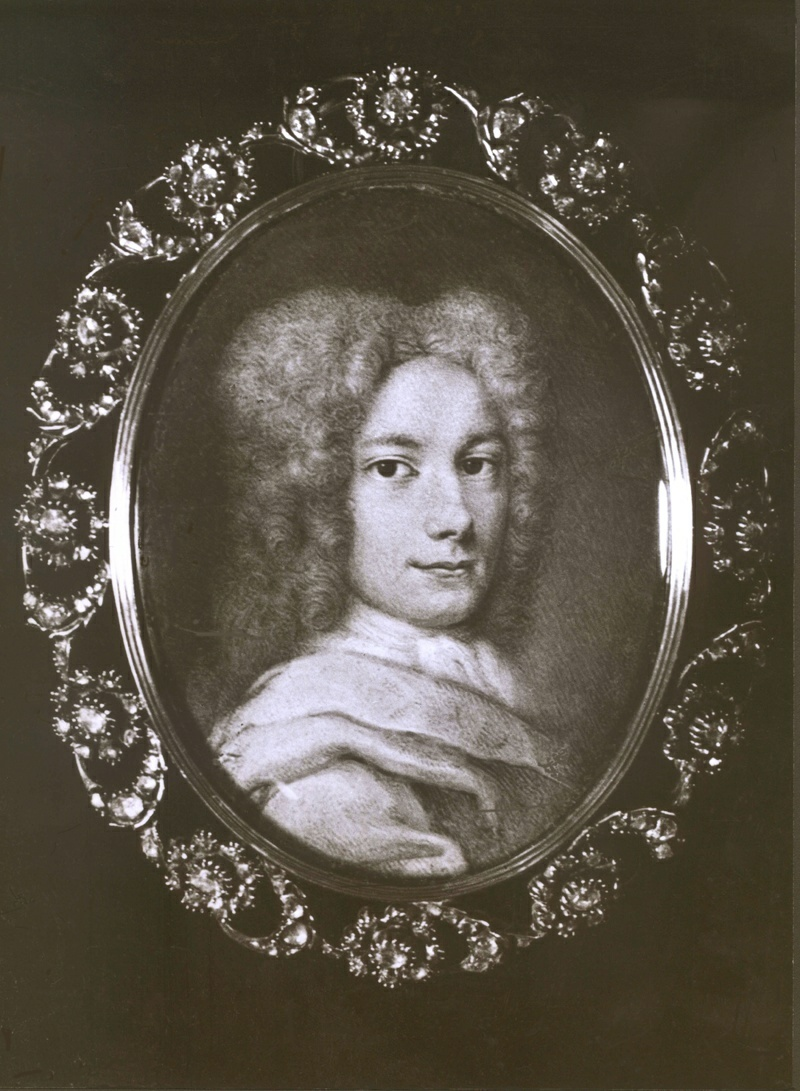
- Händel c. 1710
- English: The Resurrection
- Catalogue: HWV 47
- Year: 1708
- Text: by Carlo Sigismondo Capece
- Language: Italian
- Performed: 8 April 1708: Rome Ruspoli Palace
- Scoring: 5 soloists; choir; orchestra

La resurrezione (The Resurrection), HWV 47, is an oratorio by George Frideric Handel, set to a libretto by Carlo Sigismondo Capece (1652–1728). Capece was court poet to Queen Marie Casimire of Poland, who was living in exile in Rome. It was first performed on Easter Sunday, 8 April 1708 at Rome, with the backing of the Marchese Francesco Ruspoli, Handel's patron at this time. The work details the events between — and during — Good Friday and Easter Sunday, with the action carried forward in recitative, and exploration of character and delineation of mood taking place in the arias. The characters of the liturgical drama that appear in the oratorio are Lucifer (bass), Mary Magdalene (soprano), an angel (soprano), John the Evangelist (tenor), and Mary Cleophas (alto).

== First performance ==
A large orchestra was employed for the occasion, consisting of 39 strings of varying types, 1 viola da gamba, 2 trumpets, 1 trombone, 4 oboes and sometimes 2 timpani. The staging and scenery were also lavishly produced, and though Roman censorship of the time forbade opera, La resurrezione was certainly produced in an operatic manner. It was produced at Ruspoli's Palazzo in the main hall on the ground floor. A series of terraced seats, 4 in number, was built for the orchestra, curved towards the audience and rising at the back. Twenty-eight specially commissioned music stands were built for the occasion, engraved with either the coat-of-arms of Ruspoli or his wife. The proscenium was decorated with a tapestry depicting cherubs, palm trees, and foliage: in the middle of which hung a plaque with the name of the oratorio. The 46 letters were spread out over 4 lines, each letter about 18 cm in height. These letters were brought into prominence by the backing light of seventy light pans. The canvas backdrop represented pictorially the characters of Handel's oratorio, and in the centre was depicted the resurrection itself.

The role of Mary Magdalene was sung at the first performance by the soprano Margherita Durastanti. The participation of female singers was prohibited by Papal edict, and the Pope went to the length of admonishing Ruspoli for permitting Durastanti to take part. For the remaining performances, her role was sung by a castrato. The only details given concerning this individual are that he was called "Pippo", and that he was in service to the former Queen Casimire. Durastanti later sang the title role in Handel's Agrippina. The aria "Ho un non so che", which she had sung as Mary Magdalene anticipating the resurrection, appears entirely unadapted for her to sing in Agrippina, though in a different context. The violins at the first performance of La resurrezione were led by the famous violinist Arcangelo Corelli (who also conducted the work). It was most likely Ernst Christian Hesse who played the demanding viola da gamba solo part.

Other catalogues of Handel's music have referred to the work as HG xxxix; and HHA i/3.

== Modern revivals ==
Subsequent performances of the oratorio have remained few and far between, although the work has enjoyed some popularity from the 1980s onwards. It was thanks to the scholarship of the German conductor and musicologist Rudolf Ewerhart that La resurrezione saw the light of day once more. Whilst Friedrich Chrysander was copying and editing the oratorio, in preparation for its publication in the Händel-Gesellschaft, his sources were restricted to the autograph manuscript housed in the Royal Music Library (an extension of the British Library, renowned for its Handel collection). A copy, dating from around 1800, is also stored in the same collection, although it reportedly "has no value as a source".

In 1960, Ewerhart discovered a very early copy of the work, dated from before the first performance in 1708, in the Santini Collection at Münster. The significant alterations from the manuscript, both in Handel's own hand as well as those of copyists, implies that it was the score used for the premiere. Ewerhart would later use this edition for his 1962 recording of the work which, whilst being fundamentally important in the history of the work's discography, as since been criticised. The Handel scholar Winton Dean characterised this recording as "a revelation in its day", but spoke sourly of Ewerhart's choices of orchestration, particularly the prominent trombone, which "ran amok like a rogue elephant."

== Roles ==
Roles, voice types, and premiere cast
Role	Voice type	Premiere cast, 8 April 1708
Lucifer	bass	Cristofano Cinotti
Mary Magdalene	soprano	Margherita Durastanti
An angel	soprano castrato	Matteo Berselli
John the Evangelist	tenor	Vittorio Chiccheri
Mary Cleophas	alto castrato	Pasquale Betti (Pasqualino)

== Structure ==
Part	Type	Voice	Name
I	Overture		
I	Aria	Angel	Disserratevi, o porte d'Averno
I	Recitative	Lucifer	Qual insolita luce
I	Aria	Lucifer	Caddi, è ver, ma nel cadere
I	Recitative	Lucifer, Angel	Ma che veggio? Di spiriti a me nemici
I	Aria	Angel	D'amor fu consiglio
I	Recitative	Lucifer, Angel	E ben, questo Nume
I	Aria	Lucifer	O voi dell'Erebo
I	Recitative	Mary Magdalene	Notte, notte funesta
I	Aria	Mary Magdalene	Ferma l'ali, e sui miei lumi
I	Recitative	Mary Cleophas, Mary Magdalene	Concedi, o Maddalena
I	Aria	Mary Cleophas	Piangete, sì, piangete
I	Recitative	Mary Magdalene, Mary Cleophas	Ahi dolce mio Signore
I	Duet	Mary Magdalene, Mary Cleophas	Dolci chiodi, amate spine
I	Recitative	John, Mary Magdalene	O Cleofe, o Maddalena
I	Aria	John	Quando è parto dell'affetto
I	Recitative	Mary Cleophas, John, Mary Magdalene	Ma dinne, e sarà vero
I	Aria	St Mary Cleophas	Naufragando va per l'onde
I	Recitative	John, Mary Magdalene	Itene pure, o fide
I	Aria	John	Così la tortorella talor piange e si lagna
I	Recitative	Mary Magdalene	Se Maria dunque spera
I	Aria	Mary Magdalene	Ho un non so che nel cor
I	Recitative	Angel	Uscite pur, uscite
I	Final	All	Il Nume vincitor
II	Overture		
II	Recitative	John	Di quai nuovi portenti
II	Aria	John	Ecco il sol, ch'esce dal mare
II	Recitative	John	Ma ove Maria dimora
II	Aria	Angel	Risorga il mondo
II	Recitative	Angel	Di rabbia indarno freme
II	Recitative	Lucifer, Angel	Misero! Ho pure udito?
II	Aria	Lucifer	Per celare il nuovo scorno
II	Recitative	Angel	Oh come cieco il tuo furor delira!
II	Duet	Lucifer, Angel	Impedirlo saprò!
II	Recitative	Mary Magdalene, Mary Cleophas	Amica, troppo tardo
II	Aria	Mary Magdalene	Per me già di morire
II	Recitative	Lucifer	Ahi, abborrito nome!
II	Aria	Mary Cleophas	Vedo il ciel, che più sereno
II	Recitative	Mary Magdalene, Mary Cleophas, Angel	Cleofe, siam giunte al luogo
II	Aria	Angel	Se per colpa di donna infelice
II	Recitative	Mary Magdalene	Mio Gesù, mio Signore
II	Aria	Mary Magdalene	Del ciglio dolente
II	Recitative	Mary Cleophas	Sì, sì cerchiamo pur
II	Aria	Mary Cleophas	Augeletti, ruscelletti
II	Recitative	John, Mary Cleophas	Dove sì frettolosi
II	Aria	John	Caro Figlio, amato Dio
II	Recitative	Mary Magdalene, John, Mary Cleophas	Cleofe, Giovanni, udite
II	Aria	Mary Magdalene	Se impassibile, immortale
II	Recitative	Mary Magdalene, Mary Cleophas, John	Sì, sì col Redentore
II	Final	All	Diasi lode in cielo, in terra

== Libretto and plot ==
The libretto, based on the New Testament accounts of Christ's resurrection, reinterprets them in verse rather than a literal Italian translation. This approach parallels Barthold Heinrich Brockes' Der für die Sünde der Welt gemarterte und sterbende Jesus. Five characters engage in philosophical debates to grasp the meaning of Christ's death and resurrection.

The first part unfolds on the night between Holy Saturday and Easter Sunday, highlighting the power struggle between angels and devils. The radiant angel descends to the gates of hell to allow Christ to bring light into the darkness (Disserratevi, o porte d'Averno)—a move fiercely opposed by Lucifer (Caddi, è ver...). Believing he has thwarted Christ’s salvation by killing Him, Lucifer thinks he has triumphed. The angel shatters this illusion, declaring that the "mighty King of Glory" will put him in his place. Furious, Lucifer summons his hellish allies—the powers of Erebos and the Eumenides—to ravage the earth and wage war in heaven (O voi dell’Erebo).

As Maddalena and Cleofe mourn the deceased Christ (Ferma l'ali, e sui miei lumi; Piangete, sì, piangete; duet), John the Evangelist comes to comfort them: Jesus had promised to rise again on the third day (Quando è parto dell'affetto). Maddalena wants to go to the tomb to anoint Christ's body. Hoping to perhaps even find the Saviour alive, Cleofe goes with her (Naufragando va per l'onde). John the Evangelist, however, wants to take care of Mary, the mother of Jesus (Itene pure, o fide; Così la tortorella talor piange e si lagna).

The angel now frees the patriarchs and prophets from their hellish dungeons, they can now follow Christ into Heaven thanks to the Lord's triumph (Uscite pur, uscite ). The first part ends jubilantly with the victory over death (Il Nume vincitor).

The second part begins on Easter morning in Jerusalem. John appears joyful because Jesus has fulfilled his promise to overcome evil (Ecco il sol, ch'esce dal mare). He follows the women to Jesus' tomb to share in the miracle of the resurrection.

The angel now tells Lucifer about Christ's triumph over evil and death (Risorga il mondo). Lucifer reacts with disbelief and vows to keep this news from mankind (Per celare il nuovo scorno). However, the angel has been given the heavenly task of spreading the good news throughout the world (Duet : Impedirlo saprò!) with the help of Maddalena and Cleofe.

Maddalena and Cleofe, still unaware, approach Christ's tomb mournfully and with great uncertainty. Will the Saviour still be there? Will guards prevent them from approaching the tomb? Maddalena, however, radiates confidence, for she is certain that Jesus died for her as well (Per me già di morire). Meanwhile, Lucifer realizes that his battle against Heaven has been lost (Ahi, abborrito nome!). Christ, who has defeated him, banishes him back to the deepest abyss of hell.

Maddalena and Cleofe, who now arrive at Jesus' tomb, find it open. The angel sits in front of it and announces to the women that Jesus has risen from the dead, and instructs them to spread this news everywhere. Maddalena, knowing that all tribulation is now over, wants to set out, like Cleofe, to search for the risen Lord (Sì, sì cerchiamo pur).

John the Evangelist meets Cleofe, who is looking for him and tells him that Jesus' tomb is empty and that he has risen from the dead: an angel told her this (Augeletti, ruscelletti - with the violins in unison). But John has already heard this good news from the Virgin Mary (Caro Figlio, amato Dio - with cello accompaniment). Maddalena now arrives excitedly and reports that she saw a man in a shining robe in the garden near the tomb, who was apparently the risen Christ (Cleofe, Giovanni, udite; Se impassibile, immortale).

Now John begins to rejoice and cries out: “Jesus lives!” All three rejoice at the good news that will redeem the world (Diasi lode in cielo, in terra). Under the sign of the rising sun and the divine light of the resurrection, the oratorio comes to a jubilant end.

== Highlights ==
The greatest highlight is "Disserratevi, o porte d'Averno" (Angel, soprano) recorded by Cecilia Bartoli (Les Musiciens du Louvre, Marc Minkowski) and by Sandrine Piau (Handel: Between Heaven and Earth). Mary Magdalene's aria "Ferma l'ali, e sui miei lumi" is sometimes interpreted in recitals (Arianna Vendittelli).

There are three main arias for alto (Cleophas) "Piangete, sì, piangete" (Gabriella Martellacci), "Naufragando va per l'onde" and "Augeletti, ruscelletti", by Ann Hallenberg. "Dolci chiodi, amate spine" is a duet for soprano and alto (Mary Magdalene and Cleophas).

Basses (Lucifer) have three main arias: "Caddi, è ver, ma nel cadere" (Christopher Purves, baritone : Finest Arias for Base Voice, Vol.1 Arcangelo), "O voi dell’Erebo" and "Qual’insolita luce".

There are also a few fine arias for tenor (John the Baptist) : "Ecco il sol" and "Così la tortorella" recorded by Ian Bostridge (Great Handel, with the Orchestra of the Age of Enlightenment and Harry Bicket); "Così la tortorella", again, recorded by Rolando Villazón (Handel Arias, with Gabrieli Players and Paul McCreesh); "Caro figlio, amato Dio, già il cor mio" (by Luca Cervoni : Missing Vittorio, Arias for Vittorio Chiccheri, with Concerto Romano, Alessandro Quarta) and finally "Quando è parto dell'affetto".

Mary Magdalene's aria "Ho un non so che nel cor" was reused (also as "Ho un non so che nel cor") in Agrippina. It was originally a movement from Corelli's Violin sonata op.5, n°8, a homage to Corelli who was the lead violinist and led the orchestra at the premiere of La Resurrezione. "Col raggio placido" (Pallas, in Agrippina, end of act II) is based on Lucifer's aria "O voi dell'Erebo", which seems to be based on an aria in Reinhard Keiser's 1705 opera Octavia.

== Recordings ==
La resurrezione discography
Year	Cast: Lucifer, Mary Magdalene, Angel, John the Evangelist, Mary Cleophas	Conductor, choir, orchestra	Label
1962	Erich Wenk, Edith Kertész-Gabry, Annmarie Töpler-Marizy, Alfred Fackert, Emmy Lisken	Rudolf Ewerhart, Santini-Kammerchor, Santini Kammerorchester	LP: Vox Records cat.: SVUX 52012
1982	David Thomas, Patrizia Kwella, Emma Kirkby, Ian Partridge, Carolyn Watkinson	Christopher Hogwood, Academy of Ancient Music	CD: L'Oiseau-Lyre cat.: 421 132-2
1990	Michael George, Judith Nelson, Lisa Saffer, Jeffrey Thomas, Patricia Spence	Nicholas McGegan, Philharmonia Baroque Orchestra	CD: Harmonia Mundi cat.: 907027.28
1991	Klaus Mertens, Nancy Argenta, Barbara Schlick, Guy de Mey, Guillemette Laurens	Ton Koopman, Amsterdam Baroque Orchestra & Choir	CD: Erato Records cat.: 2292-45617-2
1996	Laurent Naouri, Jennifer Smith, Annick Massis, John Mark Ainsley, Linda Maguire	Marc Minkowski, Les Musiciens du Louvre	CD: Archiv Produktion cat.: 447 767-2
2003	Klaus Mertens, María Cristina Kiehr, Nancy Argenta, Marcel Reijans, Marijana Mijanović	Jan Willem de Vriend, Combattimento Consort Amsterdam	CD: Channel Classics cat.: CC 72120
2009	Luca Pisaroni, Kate Royal, Camilla Tilling, Toby Spence, Sonia Prina	Emmanuelle Haïm, Le Concert d'Astrée	CD: Virgin cat.: 694567 0
2009	Mitchell Sandler, Stefanie True, Klaartje van Veldhoven, Marcel Beekman, Kristine Gether	Marco Vitale, Contrasto Armonico	CD: Brilliant Classics cat.: 93805
2022	Ashley Riches, Sophie Bevan, Lucy Crowe, Hugo Hymas, Iestyn Davies	Harry Bicket; The English Concert	CD: Linn Records cat.: CKD 675

== Bibliography ==
- E. Rosand : Handel Paints the Resurrection, Festa musicologica: Essays in Honor of George J. Buelow, ed. T.J. Mathiesen and B.V. Rivera (Stuyvesant, NY, 1995), 7–52
- A. Hicks : Handel’s Early Musical Development, PRMA, ciii (1976–7), 80–89
- D. Burrows, ed.: The Cambridge Companion to Handel (Cambridge, 1997)
