= Linda Maguire =

American singer

Linda (née Maguire) Hayes Bennett (born May 7, 1959) is an American opera and classical singer, recording artist, neuroscientist and researcher in sensory therapies.

== Biography ==
Maguire was born in Newport News, Virginia and as a teenager, worked as a madrigal singer and costumed character in Williamsburg, Virginia before going on to study opera at the Oberlin Conservatory and the University of Toronto. After finishing her studies, she went on to a 23-year international career singing over thirty soprano and mezzo-soprano leading roles. In 1996, she toured extensively throughout the Netherlands, singing the lead contralto role in Gluck's Orfeo ed Euridice.

She has recorded on the Collins Classics and Deutsche Grammophon Archiv labels and recorded over eighty live vocal broadcasts of major works on radio stations CBC, BBC, NPR and others.

In 2004, she relocated from Toronto to Washington DC where she has sung in numerous performances at the John F. Kennedy Center for the Performing Arts, including Rossini's Stabat Mater, Beethoven's Symphony No. 9, Mahler's Symphony of a Thousand, Bach's cantata Gott der Herr ist Sonn und Schild, BWV 79, Amy Beach's Canticle of the Sun, and most recently, Mendelssohn's Elijah and Handel's Messiah during the 2008-2009 season.

== Awards ==
Arian Award, Metropolitan Opera Finalist, Juno Award (1993), Cardiff Singer of the World contestant representing Canada (1987).

== Concerts ==
Dido and Æneas, de Purcell : the 6 of september 1995, Royal Albert Hall, Proms 59 (BBC). With Brett Polegato (Aeneas), Linda Maguire (Dido), Jacques François Loiseleur des Longchamps (Sorceress), Benjamin Butterfield (Sailor), Shari Saunders (Belinda), Meredith Hall (First Witch), Laura Pudwell (Spirit), Orchestra : Les Musiciens du Louvre, Marc Minkowski.

== Recordings ==
- Linda Maguire Sings Berlioz, Coulthard, Wagner, Respighi – CBC Vancouver Orchestra. Label: CBC Records
- Peter Maxwell Davies: Job – CBC Vancouver Orchestra. Label: Collins Classics
- Handel: La resurrezione – Les Musiciens du Louvre. Label: Deutsche Grammophon Archiv
- Handel: Excerpts From Floridante – Tafelmusik Baroque Orchestra. Label: CBC Records
