= The Marrow Thieves =

2017 novel by Cherie Dimaline

- First edition cover art
- Author: Cherie Dimaline
- Language: English
- Genre: Science fiction; Dystopian
- Publisher: Cormorant Books Incorporated
- Publication date: September 1, 2017
- Publication place: Canada
- Pages: 231
- ISBN: 978-1-77086-486-3
- Followed by: Hunting by Stars

The Marrow Thieves is a young adult dystopian novel by Métis Canadian writer Cherie Dimaline, published on September 1, 2017, by Cormorant Books through its Dancing Cat Books imprint. By February 2020, the novel had sold over 100,000 copies.

== Plot ==
After climate change decimates the existing social order, most people lose the ability to dream. This produces catastrophic psychological results. Indigenous people, who can still dream, are hunted for their bone marrow, which is used to create a serum to treat dreamlessness. Francis, nicknamed Frenchie, loses both of his parents to “Recruiters” from the Canadian government. Recruiters kidnap Indigenous people and take them to schools where they are eventually murdered. Frenchie’s brother Mitch allows himself to be captured by Recruiters so that Frenchie can escape.

Frenchie falls in with a group of Indigenous survivors (from a variety of nations: Anishinaabeg, Cree, Métis, and Mi’kmaq). Miigwans, the group’s de facto leader, was unable to save his husband Isaac from the schools, but he cares for the other members of the group and teaches them survival skills. Frenchie falls in love with Rose, another teenage survivor; they grow closer to each other throughout their journey.

The group journeys north towards James Bay, seeking solitude and safety. They meet another pair of Indigenous people, Travis and Linc. These two betray Frenchie’s group, selling them out to Recruiters. Frenchie’s youngest companion, seven-year-old RiRi, is brutally killed in the struggle. Enraged, Frenchie shoots and kills Travis.

The remaining group members continue their journey, until the group’s oldest member, Minerva, sacrifices herself to pursuing Recruiters so the others can survive. Frenchie convinces the others to try to rescue Minerva.

As they travel, however, they meet another, larger group of survivors. The group includes Frenchie’s father, and the two are reunited. They learn from an informant that, after being taken to a school, Minerva found a way to use the power of her own dreams to counteract the Recruiters’ machinery: she burned the school down and killed many Recruiters. Frenchie and the others realise that dreaming in an Indigenous language such as Anishinaabemowin or Cree is the key to fighting against the Recruiters and their machinery. They also learn that the government plans to bring Minerva to the Capital for research. Frenchie and his companions successfully ambush the convoy carrying Minerva, but the Recruiters shoot and kill Minerva to prevent her from being rescued.

Fleeing their camp, the combined group discover one further group of survivors, including Miigwans’ husband Isaac. Miig and Isaac are finally reunited.

== Development ==
According to the Toronto Star, working with Indigenous youth inspired Dimaline to write a novel in which those youth could envision themselves as protagonists, as people with a future. She chose a teenage boy as the narrator because of the emotional intensity she could envision the character feeling and expressing in his actions. She wanted to reach both Indigenous and non-Indigenous youth at an age when they could understand these themes.

Dimaline treats the difficult topic of genocide as she wanted readers to know that such events happened to Indigenous people in the past. Dimaline said that she wants readers to come away saying “I would never let that happen again.” The author incorporates issues of climate disaster and political turmoil into the novel, which takes place approximately 40 years into the future. Dimaline has also said that she wrote the book in order to help teach people and the next generation to respect different people's stories.

== Reception ==
=== Critical response ===
Critical reception for The Marrow Thieves has been positive.

The novel received a starred review from Kirkus Reviews, which stated "Though the presence of the women in the story is downplayed, Miigwans is a true hero; in him Dimaline creates a character of tremendous emotional depth and tenderness, connecting readers with the complexity and compassion of Indigenous people."

Writing for Quill & Quire, Jessica Rose wrote that Dimaline's book "thrusts readers into the complex lives of rich and nuanced characters forced to navigate a world that too closely resembles our own." Rose also praised the novel's treatment of the "heavy subject matter," stating that the author's "graceful, almost fragile, prose ... provide[s] a beautiful undercurrent to a world that seems to have been damaged beyond repair." The reviewer also praised book’s coming-of-age narrative, most notably Frenchie’s budding romance Rose.

In The Globe and Mail, Shannon Ozirny wrote that "Dimaline takes one of the most well-known tropes in YA – the dystopia – and uses it to draw explicit parallels between the imagined horrors of a fictional future and the true historical horrors of colonialism and residential schools" and called the book "beautifully written as it is shocking and painful."

Jully Black of Canada Reads 2018 praised and appreciated the author's exploration into the theme of chosen family, where the characters have come together without blood ties and created their own pieced-together family.

=== Awards ===
The novel won the Governor General's Award for English-language children's literature at the 2017 Governor General's Awards, the 2018 Burt Award for First Nations, Métis and Inuit Literature, the 2018 Sunburst Award for young adult fiction, and the 2017 Kirkus Prize in the young adult literature category. It was one of the books competing in CBC's 2018 Canada Reads competition, listed in The Globe and Mail's 100 best books of 2017 and was a nominee for the 2018 White Pine Award. Pilleurs de rêves, a French translation of the novel by Madeleine Stratford, was shortlisted for the Governor General's Award for English to French translation at the 2019 Governor General's Awards.

== Sequel ==
A sequel, Hunting by Stars, was published on October 19, 2021. The sequel continues the storyline of Frenchie, who is now seventeen, and his found family.
