= Pwyll ap Siôn =

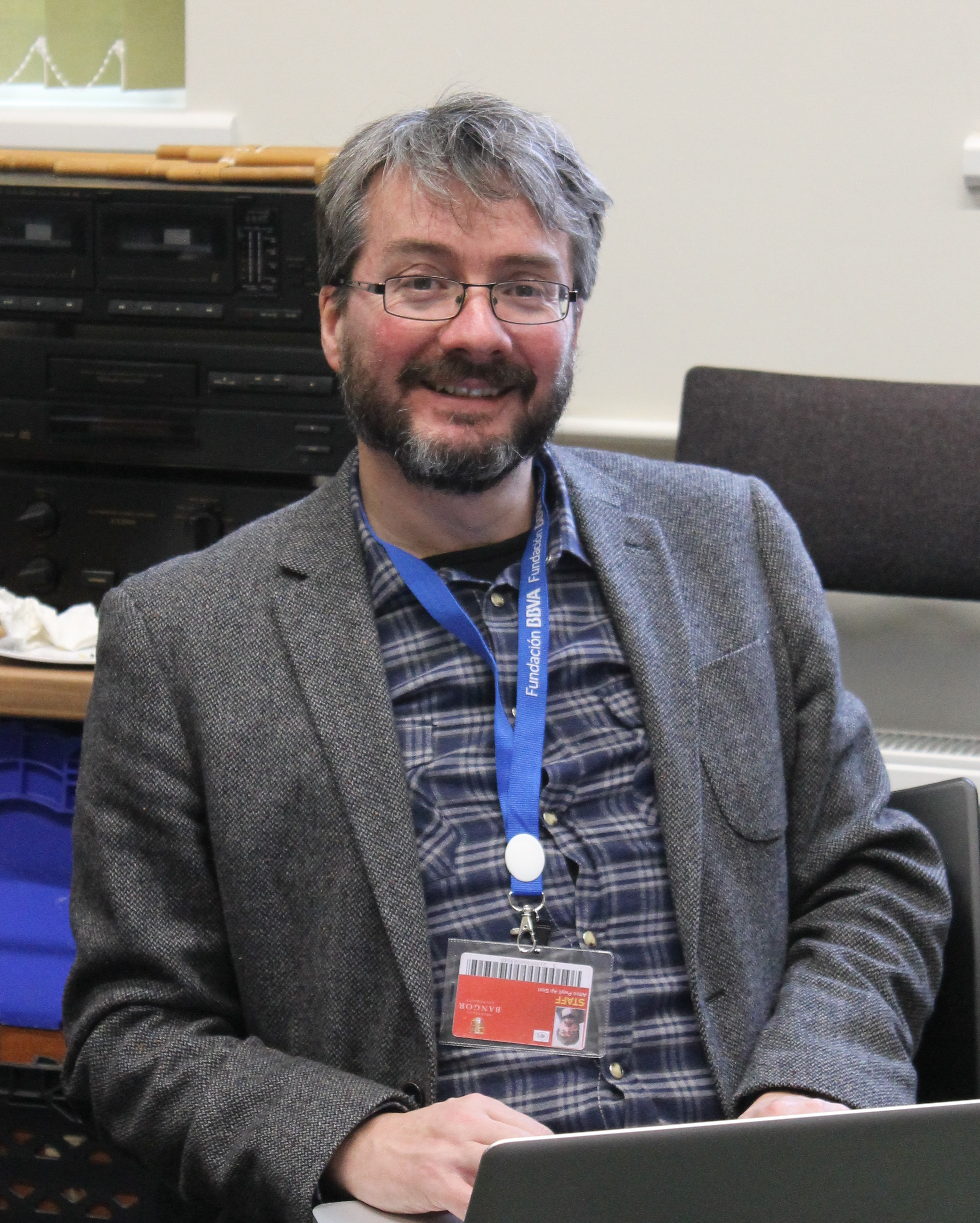
- Pwyll ap Siôn (2017)

Background information
- Born: 1968
- Occupation(s): Composer; Musicologist

Professor Pwyll ap Siôn (born 1968) is a Welsh musicologist, composer and professor in music at Bangor University. He was the recipient of the 1991 Eisteddfod Musicians' Medal. He studied alongside David Gottlieb, John Pickard and Martin Butler, receiving his doctorate in composition in 1998. In 2023 he was one of the judges for the Llŷn and Eifionydd National Eisteddfod Musician's Trophy.
