= Steven Philcox =

Canadian pianist, conductor and professor

Steven Philcox is a Canadian pianist, conductor and professor at the University of Toronto in collaborative piano.

Philcox studied at the University of British Columbia and the Manhattan School of Music. He tours as a recital accompanist and solo performer. Philcox has conducted the Canadian Opera Company and the National Arts Centre Orchestra, and was the musical director of the Highlands Opera Studio. He directs the collaborative piano department at the University of Toronto.
