= Lawrence Wiliford =

Canadian tenor

Lawrence Wiliford is a Canadian tenor.

Born in Michigan, United States, Wiliford studied at St. Olaf College and the University of Toronto, and was a member of the Canadian Opera Company's Studio Ensemble. He is particularly noted for his performances of the works of J.S. Bach. He has performed with the Canadian Opera Company, the National Arts Centre Orchestra, and Boston Baroque. His operatic roles have included Ferrando in Cosi fan tutte, Don Ottavio in Don Giovanni, and Francis Flute in A Midsummer Night's Dream.
