= Come Closer =

Come Closer may refer to:

== Films ==
- Come Closer (film)

== Albums ==
- Come Closer, by Babel Fish, 2011
- Come Closer, by Big Fat Snake, 2011
- Come Closer, by Glenn Lyse, 2008
- Come Closer, by Gregory Isaacs, 1996
- Come Closer, by Papermoon, 2004
- Come Closer, by Tarkan, or the title song, 2006
- Come Closer (Tomora album), by Tomora, or the title song, 2026
- Come Closer With... Kewei, by Kewei, 2010

== Songs ==
- "Come Closer" (Chris Andrews song), 1964
- "Come Closer" (Dee Clark song), 1964
- "Come Closer" (Miles Kane song), 2011
- "Come Closer" (Wizkid song), 2017
- "Come Closer", by A Boogie wit da Hoodie from Hoodie SZN, 2018
- "Come Closer", by Chickenfoot from Chickenfoot III, 2011
- "Come Closer", by Delain from April Rain, 2009
- "Come Closer", by Dirty Pretty Things from Romance at Short Notice, 2008
- "Come Closer", by Ju-Taun, 2014
- "Come Closer", by Marit Larsen from Under the Surface, 2006
- "Come Closer", by Michael Schenker Group from In the Midst of Beauty, 2008
- "Come Closer", by My Morning Jacket from My Morning Jacket/Songs: Ohia Split EP, 2002
- "Come Closer", by Puff Johnson from Miracle, 1996
- "Come Closer", by Room Eleven, 2007
- "Come Closer", by Salma Agha from the Kasam Paida Karne Wale Ki film soundtrack, 1984
- "Come Closer", by Sombr from I Barely Know Her, 2025
- "Come Closer", by King Missile from The Way to Salvation, 1991

== See also ==
- "Come Close remix (Closer)", a 2003 remix of "Come Close" by Common with Erykah Badu, Q-Tip and Pharrell Williams
- "Come Closer to Me" / "Acércate Más (Come Closer to Me)" composed by Osvaldo Farrés, covered by Nat King Cole, Perry Como and others
