= Sandra Horst =

Canadian pianist, vocal coach, and choral conductor

Sandra Horst is a Canadian pianist, vocal coach, and choral conductor. She is the chorus master at the Canadian Opera Company. She was profiled in the July 2009 issue of Opera News. She graduated with honors from Wilfrid Laurier University with a Bachelor of Music degree in Piano Performance. She later earned a Masters of Music in Accompaniment from New England Conservatory and earned a diploma in accompaniment from the professional studies program at the Juilliard School. She is a tenured music professor at the University of Toronto. She has previously served on the staffs of the Banff Centre for the Arts, the Boston Lyric Opera, the Chautauqua Institute, Juilliard Opera Center, Opera Hamilton, Opera Saskatchewan, and the Opera Theatre of Saint Louis.
