= Krisztina Szabó =

Canadian opera singer

Krisztina Szabó is a Hungarian-Canadian mezzo-soprano, best known for her work in opera.

A graduate of the University of Western Ontario, Szabó finished her postgraduate studies at the Guildhall School of Music and Drama in London. She was awarded an Emerging Artist grant from the Canada Council.

Szabó was a 1997 winner of the Mozart Competition, held under the auspices of the Canadian Opera Company (COC), and in 1998 she joined the COC Ensemble Studio. It was with the Ensemble Studio that she sang the title role in Benjamin Britten’s The Rape of Lucretia, with which she made her European debut in Amsterdam. A 2023 article in the Toronto Star described her, along with Ben Heppner and Wallis Giunta, as the three “most notable alumni” of the COC Ensemble Studio since its inception in 1980.
