= Richard Bradshaw (conductor) =

Richard Bradshaw OOnt FRCMT(hon)

Background information
- Birth name: Richard James Bradshaw
- Born: 26 April 1944; Rugby, Warwickshire, England
- Died: 15 August 2007 (aged 63); Toronto, Ontario, Canada
- Genres: Classical opera
- Occupation: Conductor
- Formerly of: Glyndebourne Festival Opera; San Francisco Opera; Canadian Opera Company

Richard James Bradshaw OOnt FRCMT(hon) (26 April 1944 – 15 August 2007) was a British opera conductor and the General Director of the Canadian Opera Company (COC) in Toronto.

== Early life and education ==
Bradshaw was born in Rugby, Warwickshire, England. He grew up in Higham Ferrers in Northamptonshire, where he began taking piano lessons when he was eight years old, and played the organ at his church when he was twelve. Bradshaw received a Bachelor of Arts with honours in English from University of London in 1965. He studied conducting with Adrian Boult.

== Career ==
In 1971, Bradshaw conducted several concerts with the Royal Liverpool Philharmonic Orchestra.

From 1975 to 1977, Bradshaw was the Chorus Director at the Glyndebourne Festival Opera. From 1977 to 1989, he was Chorus Director and Resident Conductor at San Francisco Opera.

In 1988, he was a guest conductor of the Canadian Opera Company. In 1989, he was appointed Chief Conductor and Head of Music. In 1993 he conducted the company's production of Bartok's "Bluebeard's Castle" and Schoenberg's "Erwartung", which toured to the Brooklyn Academy of Music in New York and to the Edinburgh International Festival.

In 1994, he was appointed Artistic Director and General Director in 1998. At the COC, he conducted more than 60 operas as well as leading the orchestra in concerts.

In 2004, he was made a member of the Order of Ontario for having "brought the COC international acclaim, including a first-ever invitation to the Edinburgh Festival, garnering two prestigious awards".

In 2006, Bradshaw received the National Arts Centre Award, a companion award of the Governor General's Performing Arts Awards, Canada's highest honour in the performing arts. It was also that year that saw the opening of the Four Seasons Centre for the Performing Arts. In September of that year, Bradshaw and the COC opened the season with three complete performances of Wagner's Ring, becoming the first conductor since Wagner himself to inaugurate an opera house with a complete Ring. He continued to conduct the COC orchestra until his death the following year.

== Death and legacy ==
On 15 August 2007, at age 63, Bradshaw died after collapsing from an apparent heart attack while at Toronto Pearson International Airport. He left a wife Diana, daughter Jenny, and son James.

The Richard Bradshaw Fellowship in Opera at the University of Toronto was founded in his name, and Toronto's Richard Bradshaw Amphitheatre was named for him. A prize in his name was presented at the Canadian International Organ Competition in Montreal in 2008.

== Sources ==
- "Richard Bradshaw". Canadian Who's Who 1997. University of Toronto Press.
- "Order of Ontario recipients for 2004 announced". Archived from the original on 30 September 2007.

Cultural offices
Preceded by Brian Dickie	General Director of the Canadian Opera Company; 1998–2007	Succeeded by Alexander Neef (a/o 1 October 2008)
