= Brett Polegato =

Canadian opera singer

Brett Polegato (born 1968 in Niagara Falls, Ontario, Canada) is an operatic baritone.

== History ==
He performed in concert at Dido and Æneas, de Purcell : the 6 of September 1995, Royal Albert Hall, Proms 59 (BBC). With Brett Polegato (Aeneas), Linda Maguire (Dido), Jacques François Loiseleur des Longchamps (Sorceress), Benjamin Butterfield (Sailor), Shari Saunders (Belinda), Meredith Hall (First Witch), Laura Pudwell (Spirit), Orchestra : Les Musiciens du Louvre, Marc Minkowski.

In 1999 he made his Lyric Opera of Chicago debut as Peter Niles in Levy's Mourning Becomes Electra followed by his La Scala debut in 2000 as Ned Keene in Britten's Peter Grimes. He is particularly known for his interpretation of the title role in Debussy's Pelléas et Mélisande which he has performed with many companies including the Bavarian State Opera, Opéra National de Paris, Oper Leipzig, and Opéra National du Rhin. Other European appearances include Ubalde in Gluck's Armide at Opéra de Nice, the title role in Monteverdi's Orfeo at Opéra d'Avignon, and Frère Lèon in Messiaen's Saint François d'Assise at Opéra National de Paris. He has sung numerous roles with Flanders Opera, including Guglielmo in Mozart's Così fan tutte, Albert in Massenet's Werther, and the Steward in Jonathan Dove's Flight. In his native Canada, Polegato has sung Papageno in Mozart's Die Zauberflöte, Figaro in Rossini's Il barbiere di Siviglia, and Zurga in Bizet's Les pêcheurs de perles with Vancouver Opera. In the United States, he has sung with New York City Opera, Houston Grand Opera, and Michigan Opera Theatre as well as making many concert appearances and recordings with American orchestras. He made his Seattle Opera debut in 2005 as Henry Miles in Jake Heggie's The End of the Affair and returned to the company in 2007 as Orestes in Gluck's Iphigénie en Tauride.

== Awards and recognition ==
During the early stages of his career, he was a finalist at the 1995 Cardiff Singer of the World Competition.

Polegato was a soloist on the Atlanta Symphony Orchestra and Chorus's recording of Ralph Vaughan Williams' A Sea Symphony, which won Grammy Awards in 2003 for Best Choral Performance and Best Classical Album.
