= Cherie Dimaline =

Métis writer

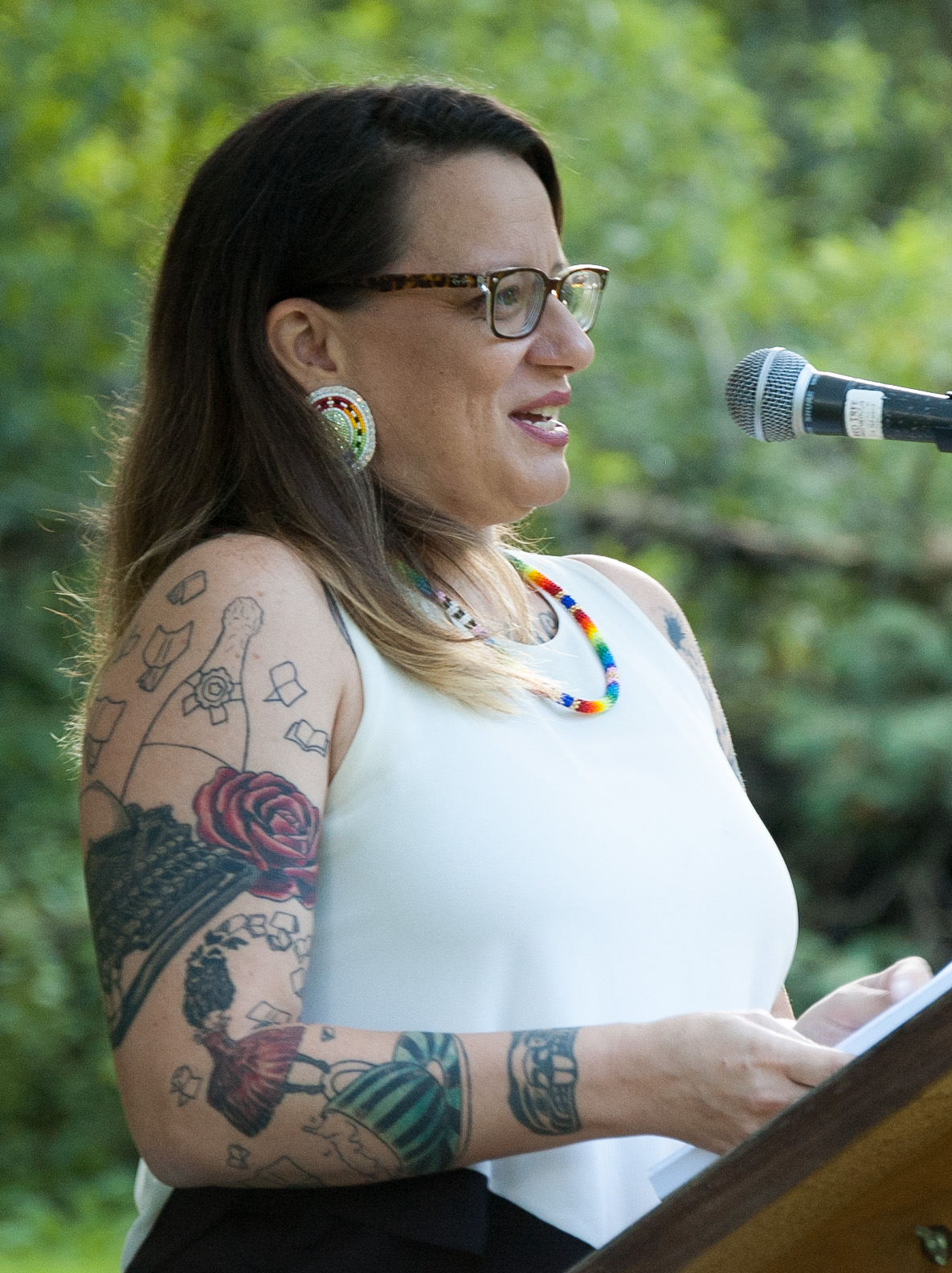
- Dimaline at the Eden Mills Writers' Festival in 2016
- Born: 2 July 1975 (age 51)
- Occupation: Author
- Writing career
- Genres: Fiction, Young adult
- Website: www.cheriedimaline.com

Cherie Dimaline (/ʃəˈri ˈdɪməlaɪn/) is a writer and a member of the Georgian Bay Métis Council of the Métis Nation of Ontario. She is most notable for her 2017 young adult novel The Marrow Thieves, which explores the continued colonial exploitation of Indigenous peoples.

Dimaline won the award for Fiction Book of the Year at the Anskohk Aboriginal Literature Festival for her first novel, Red Rooms. She has since published the short story Seven Gifts for Cedar, the novel The Girl Who Grew a Galaxy, and the short story collection A Gentle Habit. She was the 2019 editor of Little Bird Stories (Volume IX), published by Invisible Publishing and featuring winners of the annual Little Bird Writing Contest run by the Sarah Selecky Writing School.

She was the founding editor of Muskrat Magazine, was named the Emerging Artist of the Year at the Ontario Premier's Awards for Excellence in Arts in 2014, and became the first Indigenous writer-in-residence for the Toronto Public Library.

== Biography ==
Dimaline was originally a resident of a Métis community in the Georgian Bay area. She now resides in the city of Toronto. Her childhood summers were spent back in her Métis community. During her time spent back home, Dimaline learned stories from her family that she then passed onto her cousins. Growing up, she worked as a magician's assistant. From then on, Dimaline worked a variety of jobs, being employed as a curator for a museum, a high-level manager for an investment company, and the director of a women's resource center.

Dimaline has contributed to a variety of projects including the anthology Mitêwâcimowina: Indigenous Science Fiction and Speculative Storytelling, published in 2016. Dimaline was also a columnist and editor for Chatelaine in the early 2000s.

Dimaline considers herself a Métis or Indigenous writer, not a Canadian writer, saying "I would love to be recognized as a writer of Indigenous stories. I'm not a Canadian writer. This is what is now known as Canada; it means something different to and for me."

== Community involvement ==
Dimaline has participated in numerous literary festivals, including Kingston WritersFest (2016), Toronto International Festival of Authors (2016, 2018, 2019), Ottawa Writers Festival (2017, 2018, 2019, 2023), Wordfest Imaginairium (2019, 2023), and Vancouver Writers Fest (2020, 2021, 2023).

== Bibliography ==
=== Books ===
- Red Rooms (2007)
- Seven Gifts for Cedar (2010)
- The Girl Who Grew a Galaxy (2013)
- A Gentle Habit (2015)
- The Marrow Thieves (2017)
- Empire of Wild (2019)
- Little Bird Stories, Volume 9 (2019)
- Hunting by Stars (2021)
- VenCo (2023)
- An Anthology of Monsters: How Story Saves Us from Our Anxiety (2023)
- Tiger Lily and the Secret Treasure of Neverland (2023)
- Funeral Songs for Dying Girls (2023)
- Into The Bright Open (2023)

=== Short stories ===
- "Tick Talk" in Never Whistle At Night: An Indigenous Dark Fiction Anthology (2023)

== Awards ==
In 2014, Dimaline was named the Emerging Artist of the Year at the Ontario Premier's Awards for Excellence in the Arts.

The Marrow Thieves won the Governor General's Award for English-language children's literature at the 2017 Governor General's Awards and the 2017 Kirkus Prize in the young adult literature category, and it was a finalist in the CBC's 2018 Canada Reads competition and for the 2018 White Pine Award. Dimaline's acceptance speech for the 2017 Governor General's Award for English Young Adult Fiction was delivered by her friend, artist Susan Blight in Anishinaabemowin. Dimaline said about the event, "I wrote the speech and she [Blight] delivered it without translation." This was the first time an acceptance speech for the Governor General's Award was delivered in a language other than English or French.

Dimaline was the 2021 recipient of the Writers' Trust Engel/Findley Award.

Into the Bright Open: A Secret Garden Remix was shortlisted for the Governor General's Award for English-language children's literature at the 2024 Governor General's Awards.

In 2026 she was named the recipient of the Vicky Metcalf Award for Literature for Young People by the Writers' Trust of Canada.

== Reception ==
The Marrow Thieves has been widely acclaimed for its portrayal of Indigenous colonization and ecological devastation. The book has been lauded for its ability to cross over from YA fiction to adult fiction. It was defended by Jully Black as a finalist in the 2018 Canada Reads competition. Dimaline's novels have also been written about in academia, notably by Niranjana Iyer and Petra Fachinger.
