= Canadian Opera Company =

Opera company based in Toronto, Ontario

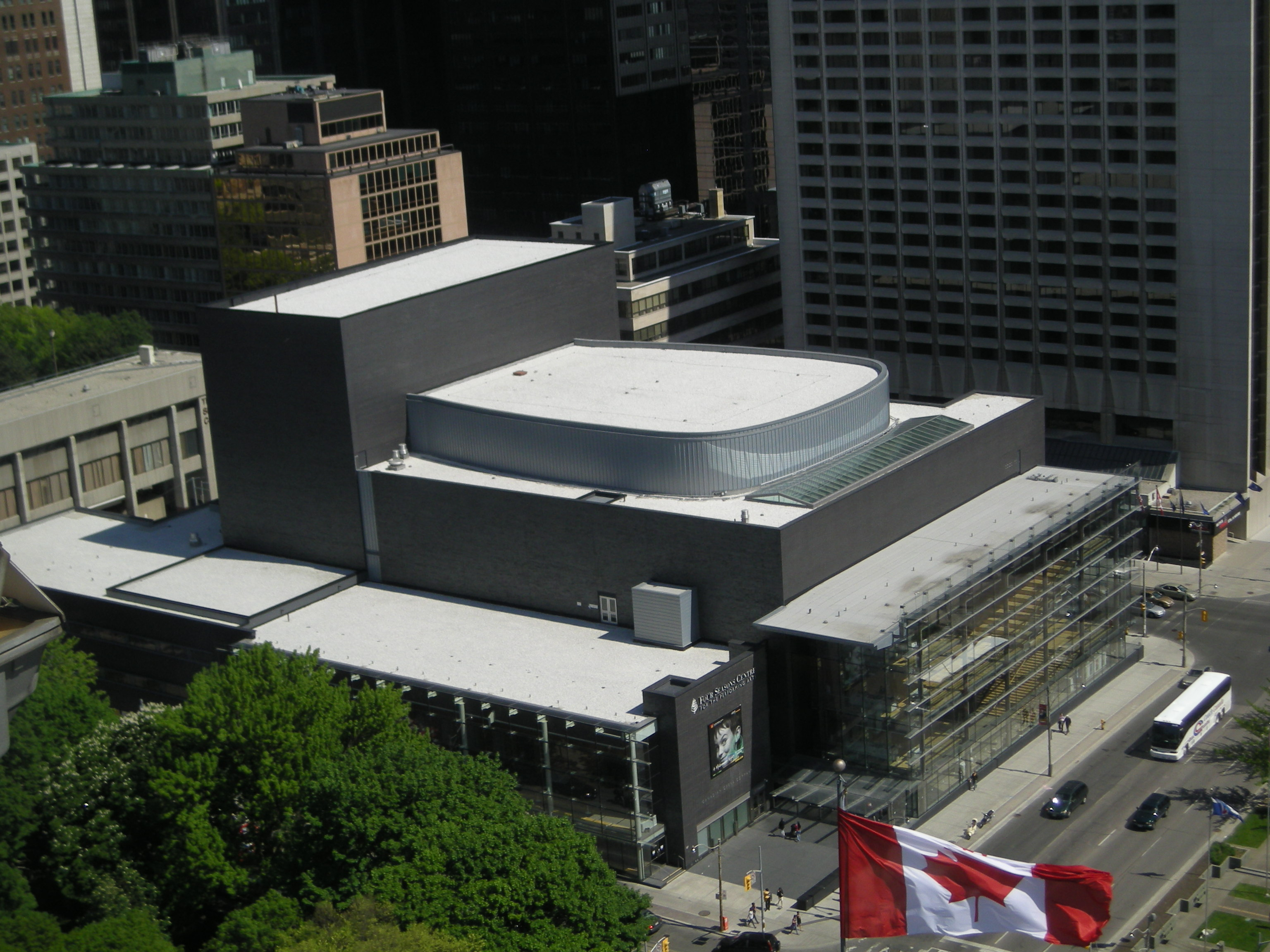
- The Four Seasons Centre, home of the Canadian Opera Company.
- Founded: November 13, 1950
- Type: Professional opera company
- Location(s): 145 Queen Street West; Toronto, Ontario, Canada
- Website: www.coc.ca
- Formerly called: Opera Festival Association of Toronto

The Canadian Opera Company (COC) is an opera company in Toronto, Ontario, Canada. It is the largest opera company in Canada and one of the largest opera producers in North America. The COC performs at the Four Seasons Centre for the Performing Arts, which was purpose-built for opera and ballet and is shared with the National Ballet of Canada.

The company was founded out of the University of Toronto's opera school in 1950 for commercial opera productions at the Royal Alexandra Theatre. In 1961, the company moved its home stage to the O'Keefe Centre (now known as Meridian Hall). In 2006, the company moved to the Four Seasons Centre.

== History ==
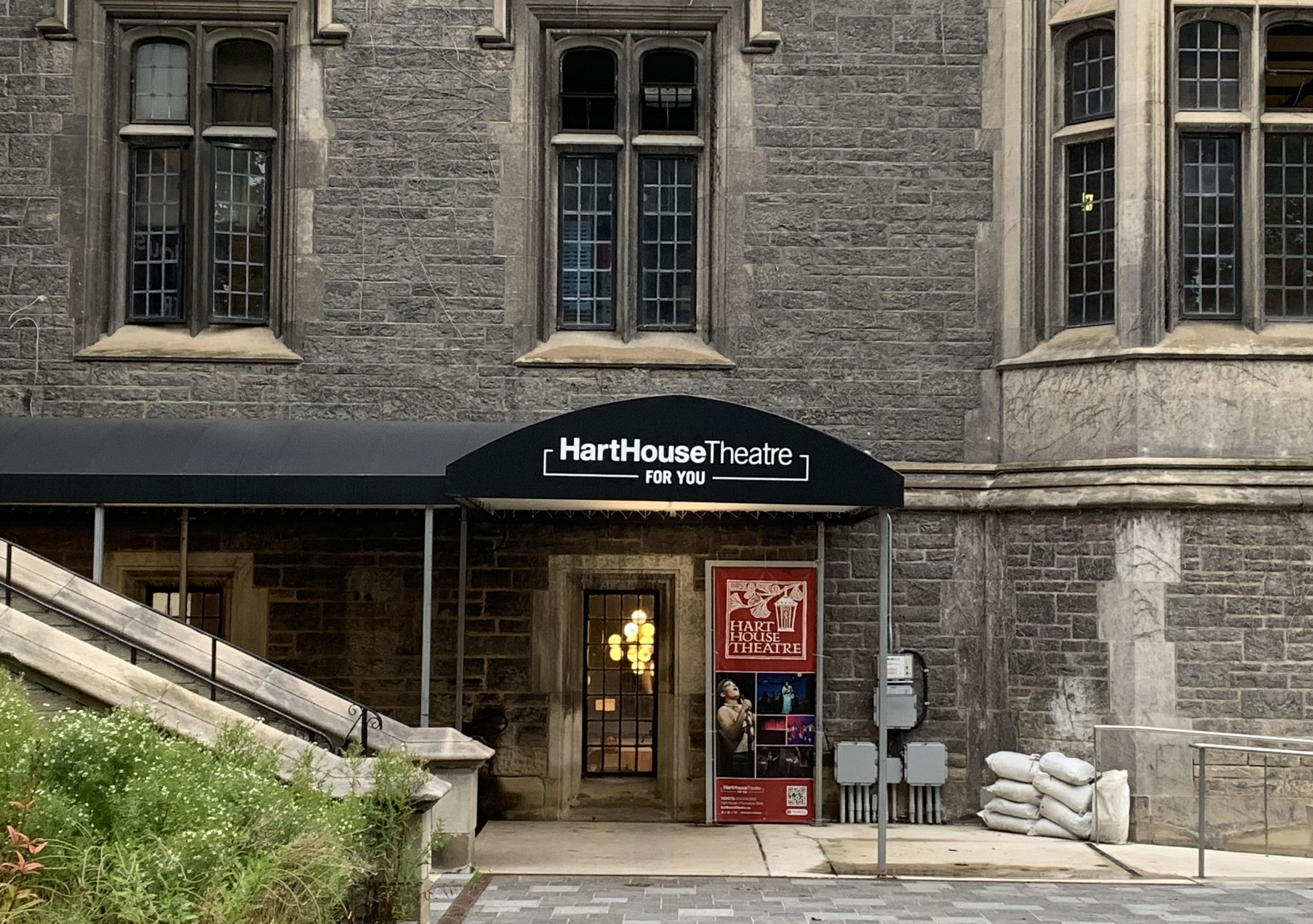
Hart House Theatre - COC's first theatre

After World War II, Arnold Walter, head of the Senior School at the University of Toronto's Toronto Conservatory, started an opera school at the Conservatory. He appointed Nicholas Goldschmidt as its pianist-conductor, and Broadway director Felix Brentano as its stage director. The opera school's first performance was an opera excerpt show at Hart House Theatre. This was followed by performances at the Eaton Auditorium, the Art Gallery of Toronto and the Royal Alexandra Theatre (Royal Alex). Brentano left in 1948, and Herman Geiger-Torel was hired as the stage director and professor at the school. The opera school collaborated with the Canadian Broadcasting Corporation to create the CBC Opera Company, which produced radio productions using the opera school's students and staff. In 1949, the CBC Opera produced two live performances of Carmen at Massey Hall.

In 1949, Walter, Goldschmidt and Geiger-Torel announced that the "Royal Conservatory Opera Company" would mount an eight-day festival of three operas at the Royal Alex. Although its orchestra capacity was limited, the theatre was the closest that Toronto had to an opera house. Tympani, percussion and double basses had to be placed in box seats. The first Toronto Opera Festival was held from February 3–11, 1950, performing La Bohème, Rigoletto and Don Giovanni, directed by Goldschmidt and Geiger-Torel. The festival produced a profit of CA$2,000 (equivalent to $26,272 in 2025)

In November 1950, the University of Toronto forbade the Conservatory from being financially responsible for commercial productions. To continue to use the Conservatory's facilities, an independent opera company should be incorporated. This was the beginning of the company, and it was incorporated under the name of the "Opera Festival Association of Toronto." Goldschmidt was musical director, Geiger-Torel was stage director, and Ernest Rawley of the Royal Alex was the general manager. In 1951, the company decided going forth that it would produce three operas per festival, look for a rehearsal space independent of the Conservatory, and take productions on tour in Ontario.

In 1952, the Conservatory and the opera company hired Italian Ernesto Barbini (who had experience at the Metropolitan Opera [The Met]) as coach and conductor, and he conducted Madama Butterfly in the 1953 festival. That year, the company toured for the first time, taking Cosi fan tutte with piano accompaniment, to Peterborough. As well, the production of The Consul with soprano Theresa Gray, was considered a "ground-breaking triumph." In 1954, the company started a full tour of productions around Ontario to Hamilton, Kitchener and London. It branded itself as the Royal Conservatory Opera Company. The 1954 season hurt the company, leading to a loss of CA$10,000, which its guarantors had to pay.

The 1956 festival season was another disappointment, having its lowest income and poorest attendance (76 per cent). It lost CA$30,000, substantial for the time. The company added Ottawa to its tour. Geiger-Torel, offered a position at the Met, was given a raise and became the company's artistic director.

In 1957, the company again changed its branding, this time to "Canadian Opera Company (of Toronto)", retaining its Opera Festival Association legal name. It changed the festival's dates from February to October. This would enable Toronto Symphony Orchestra (TSO) musicians to join the opera orchestra for performances. To help the board's finances, the Metropolitan Toronto government began giving an annual grant of CA$10,000. The Canadian Council for the Arts (Canada Council) gave CA$10,000 to help with touring. The 1957 tour added Montreal to its list of stops.

In 1958, the company added Walter Susskind of the TSO to conduct La Bohème. Susskind would conduct with the opera company until 1963. Geiger-Torel was named general director. The 1958 tour was expanded to the Maritime provinces and Newfoundland, sponsored by the Canada Council, touring a production of The Barber of Seville.

In 1959, the company founded the Canadian Opera Guild. This group held pre-opera lectures, produced newsletters and promoted opera across Canada. The company would help found Opera Guilds International in 1974.

In 1961, the Association moved its performances from the Royal Alex to the new O'Keefe Centre for the Performing Arts. The O'Keefe, a multi-purpose hall, had a larger capacity and room for a full orchestra, but was not yet the ideal home the company desired. For one thing, it did not have ideal acoustics for opera, requiring well-hidden amplification, and its orchestra pit was not as large as the company wished. The company performed five operas that season at the O'Keefe: Tosca, Carmen, The Bartered Bride and a double-bill of Cavalleria rusticana and Pagliacci (directed by Leon Major), and they were included in the Centre's subscription series. The move was financially successful for the company, returning a surplus.

While not ideal, the O'Keefe, with its larger stage, provided the company with the ability to mount larger productions, such as Aida and Der Rosenkavalier in 1963. The company was cut from the O'Keefe subscription series in 1964 and launched its own subscription series, to the worry of management. The worry was groundless; the company's attendance increased and provided a surplus of CA$25,000.

In 1967, Canada's Centennial year, the company was given funds by the Centennial Commission to commission two new operas. Raymond Pannell wrote The Luck of Ginger Coffey, with libretto by Ron Hambleton, based on a Brian Moore novel. Harry Somers wrote Louis Riel with libretto by Mavor Moore. The Company performed both new operas, plus Madama Butterfly, Il Trovatore, Tales of Hoffman and The Barber of Seville to complete a very busy season. As well as performing in Toronto, the company performed Riel and Tales of Hoffman at Expo 67.

1967 also saw the beginning of Prologue to the Performing Arts. This program introduced in-school performances at high schools of dance, theatre and opera companies. Canadian Opera participated annually, starting with La Serva Padrona accompanied with piano.

In 1969, the new National Arts Centre (NAC) in Ottawa opened. In addition to its regular season, Canadian Opera performed Rigoletto and Fledermaus in Ottawa. The opera hall was praised by the company, and the company made annual summer season visits to Ottawa for the next ten years.

In 1970, the company toured the United States. This, plus the fall season at the O'Keefe, put the company in good standing financially. A special performance of Fidelio to celebrate the 200th anniversary of Beethoven's birth was celebrated by critics.

A review of the company was made by Lord Harewood for the Ontario Arts Council in 1972. Harewood made numerous suggestions, such as having the company produce more innovative operas, it consider moving to Ottawa and travelling to the O'Keefe annually. Harewood also suggested producing two seasons annually, in conjunction with the National Ballet, so that they could use the same orchestra. Or that the company could mount smaller operas back at the Royal Alex. The O'Keefe manager, Hugh Walker appeared at the Council to plead that the company stay at the O'Keefe, although the opera company would rather have its own hall. The company did perform a small version of Cosi fan tutte at the Royal Alex, but it was not well attended and the company did not play at the Royal Alex again for many years.

The 1973 season saw the company perform 36 performances, its longest season yet, and box office receipts increased to CA$722,448, its best financial performance yet. In January 1974, Jan Rubes was named director of touring and program development. The company expanded the time it would spend on the road, increasing the number of days a production would perform per city to three or more. The deficit ballooned adding CA$60,000 for the 1974 season alone, to a total of CA$308,000.

The board wanted change and prepared a retirement package for Geiger-Torel. Reluctantly, he accepted the package in January 1975. He worked on programming for the 1975 season, although he would no longer be the general director, while the board searched for a replacement. The season was nearly cancelled by a stagehands strike, but Geiger-Torel was able to conclude an agreement.

At the same time, the board selected Lotfi Mansouri as the new general director, with Geiger-Torel's endorsement, at a much higher salary than Geiger-Torel. Mansouri would take over in July 1976.

The 1975 season was successful artistically but had a large CA$117,000 deficit, now pushing the accumulated deficit to CA$478,000 The company cut the 1976 season to four operas to save costs and launched the "Canadian Opera Rescue Fund" fund-raising campaign to raise CA$803,000. The company broke ties with the Toronto Symphony Orchestra over the shortened season and had to again organize its own orchestra. Geiger-Torel's final season produced cut-back operas, but was financially successful, producing a surplus, which, combined with fundraising, lowered the accumulated deficit to CA$116,000. Not long after the season, Geiger-Torel died on October 6, and a memorial tribute to Geiger-Torel was held at the University of Toronto's MacMillan Theatre.

In 1977, the company, already using the Canadian Opera Company in advertising, changed its legal name to the Canadian Opera Company. That year, the COC decided to pair with the National Ballet on a new home and hired consultants Woods, Gordon to examine various proposals.

Mansouri reorganized the board and made some critical appointments. He hired Phillip Boswell as assistant director to John Leberg, Margaret Genovese to head marketing, and Dory Vanderhoof for fund-raising. He planned to extend the company's season, more adventurous programming, forward financial planning, to cut ties with the University and resolve its relationship with the TSO. Fund-raising, marketing, and artistic decisions would be made with an eye to the overall growth of the company. Mansouri would make artistic decisions, with Leberg and Boswell.

The 1977 season was Mansouri's first, producing Don Carlos, The Magic Flute, The Daughter of the Regiment and Wozzeck (directed by Mansouri, a Canadian premiere). This mix of popular, plus light-hearted, plus unique, operas would be the mix during Mansouri's tenure. Also, more international singers were cast, including Paul Plishka and Tatiana Troyanos. The company continued its shortened season of 25 performances. The fall tour took the company to the Maritimes, followed by a winter tour in the United States.

The 1978 season saw more changes. Instead of doing the operas in a festival, the performances were spread out over more months. This necessitated the formation of the COC's own orchestra, as the TSO could not accommodate the new schedule. Unable to fit spring dates into the O'Keefe, the COC returned to the Royal Alex for the spring series as part of the Royal Alex's subscription series. This doubled the number of performances in Toronto to 57. With its subsequent tour of Eastern Canada, Ontario and the United States, it now performed 176 times. In a performance at the NAC, the COC was nationally televised on the CBC for the first time.

For the 1979-80 season, the COC was able to produce its entire season at the O'Keefe from September to May; the Royal Alex series was discontinued. And the operas were spread out during the period, giving the company more rehearsal time. The company produce five premieres: Simon Boccanegra, Tristan und Isolde, L'elisir d'amore, Werther and Peter Grimes along with Madama Butterfly from the standard repertoire. However, the deficit increased again, leaving the accumulated deficit at CA$685,000.

In May 1980, the Opera Company formed its Resident Ensemble. This was a group of nine young Canadian singers who would be given supporting roles in O'Keefe productions as a bridge to a professional career. Its musical director was Stuart Hamilton, and Derek Bate was its conductor. The Ensemble would tour Ontario communities, and later would appear across Canada.

The COC moved its offices to Harbourfront Centre and used the former ice shop of the warehouse complex as a scene shop. The ice-house would eventually become an art gallery and the Du Maurier Theatre Centre. Beginning in 1995, the Ensemble would perform at Harbourfront during the summer at the outdoor stage and at the du Maurier Theatre.

In 1983, the COC introduced surtitles (supertitles) to their productions, the first company to use them in an opera house. Productions included Joan Sutherland's first performance of Donizetti's Anna Bolena.

In 1984, the COC bought several former industrial buildings on Front Street East and inaugurated the Joey and Toby Tanenbaum Opera Centre. Paid for by Hal Jackman, Joey Tanenbaum, plus grants from the Ontario and Canadian governments, the renovated facilities included a large rehearsal space and theatre, offices and prop storage. It opened in 1985, and the first performance (The Beggar's Opera) at the theatre was held in February 1986. Later that year, the company bought a building on Melita Avenue for set construction. The studio theatre was named the Texaco Opera Theatre until 1989, when it was changed to the Imperial Oil Theatre.

In fall 1988, Mansouri accepted an invitation to take over the San Francisco Opera Company starting in 1989. Brian Dickie, the former head of the Glyndebourne Opera Festival, was selected as his replacement. Dickie served as the COC's general director from 1988 to 1993. During his tenure, the COC featured Canadian directors, a move the Mansouri administration had not previously undertaken. These included Robin Phillips, Robert Carsen, Richard Monette, Robert Lepage, and Brian Macdonald. Mansouri returned to the COC to direct another production of Wozzeck in the 1989–90 season.

In 1989, Dickie named Richard Bradshaw of the San Francisco Opera as the COC's chief conductor and head of music. Bradshaw made his production conducting debut in 1991's Eugene Onegin. A 1985 agreement with the musicians' union had established a regular orchestra; Bradshaw's job was to improve the quality of the orchestra and its stability.

During this period, there was a large turnover in the administration of the company. John Leberg left to join Mansouri in San Francisco. Dory Vanderhoof left in February 1989. Margaret Genovese followed in April 1989. Philip Boswell left in 1992.

In the spring of 1991, the COC performed three Mozart compositions on the 200th anniversary of his passing. The three operas: Cosi fan tutte. Le nozze di Figaro, and La clemenza di Tito These were performed at the renovated Elgin Theatre on Yonge Street. The COC would perform at the Elgin again later in 1991, 1992, 1993, and 1994.

The 1991-1994 seasons saw a steady decline in subscriptions and attendance. From a peak in 1989-90 of 19,190 subscriptions, it fell to 9,283 in 1994-95. Attendance dropped by 50,000 over the same period. This was partly attributed to an economic recessionary period, and also the introduction of the GST tax that increased ticket prices. The financial position of the company also declined, being CA$2.9 million in deficit in 1993. Dickie himself became an issue for the company. In the summer of 1993, matters came to a head with the board. Dickie left in October 1993.

Bradshaw was named artistic director and music director. Elaine Calder, who was the administrative director of the Shaw Festival, was named general director in June 1994. Calder was expected to do dual duties with the company: search for a new opera house and improve the running of the company. Calder was unhappy with the situation and resigned in November 1997. In 1998, Bradshaw was named general director. He elevated Cathryn Gregor from musical administration to administrative director, leaving Bradshaw free to handle the artistic side of the company, and advocate for a new opera house. Philip Boswell returned to resume being the artistic administrator.

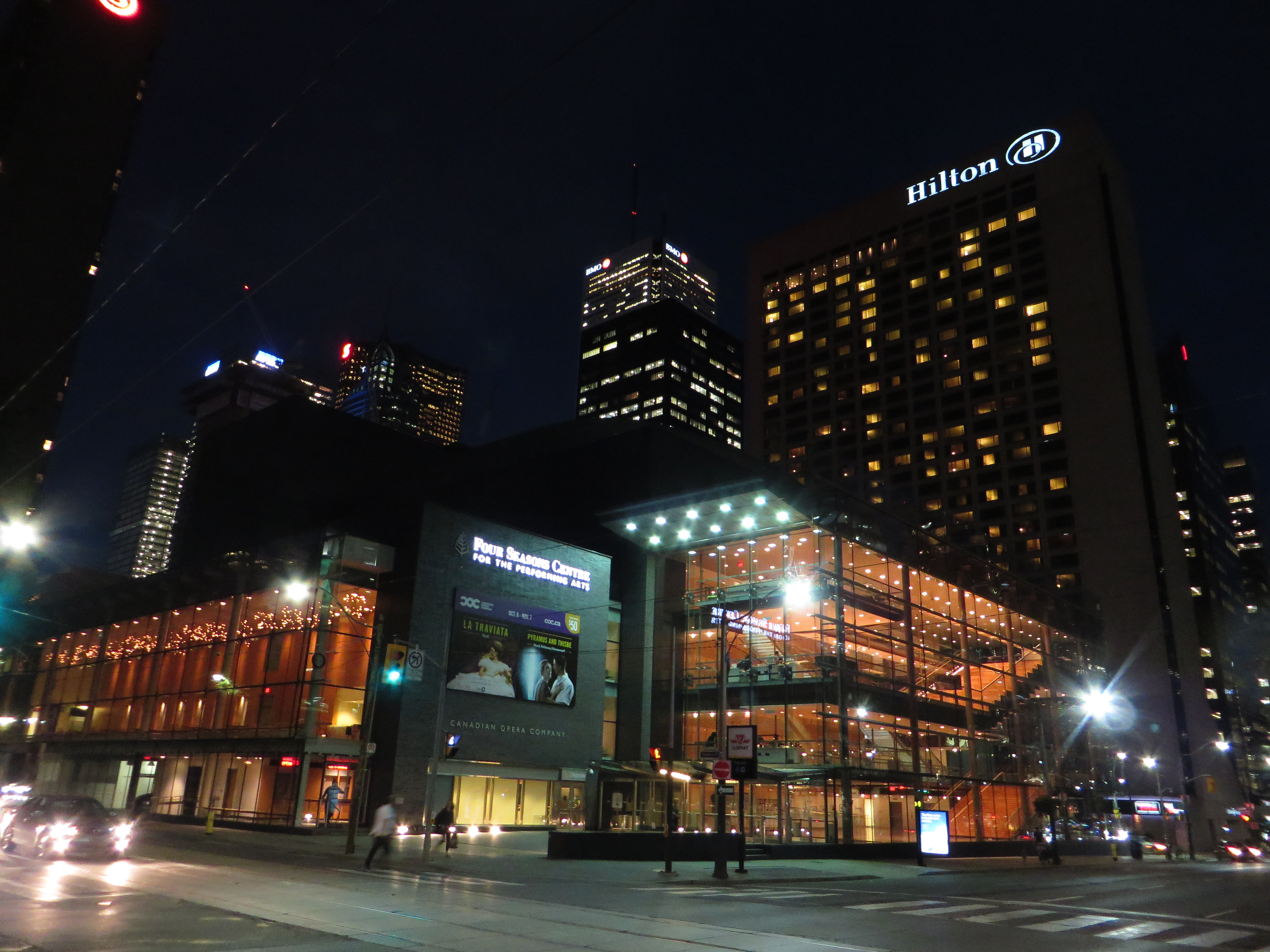
Four Seasons Centre for the Performing Arts in Toronto, Ontario

=== Move to Four Seasons Centre ===
It had long been a goal of the Canadian Opera Company to have a hall purpose-built for opera. Exploring possibilities began in 1977, with the hiring of consultants to report on new hall possibilities. In 1983, the Opera/Ballet Hall Corporation (a partnership of the COC and National Ballet) was incorporated. In January 1985, the Ontario government promised a site for an opera hall at Bay Street and Wellesley, and CA$65 million towards its construction. In 1988, Moshe Safdie was selected as architect.

By this time, Loftani had moved on, and in 1990, a new NDP Ontario government was elected. It rescinded its monetary offer, and in 1992, withdrew the offer for the land. The Hall Corporation was dissolved, and the land was developed for residential use. A new Conservative government was elected in 1995. It was opposed to any help for an opera hall.

An added complication was the City of Toronto's plans to renovate the O'Keefe Centre. However, the plans to renovate the Centre would still not have resolved the acoustics and the lack of a fully adequate orchestra pit. The City would not commit funds to a new hall and to renovations of the O'Keefe. The City proceeded to renovate the O'Keefe, by then known as the Hummingbird Centre, and an amplification system used in several opera houses was installed.

In 1997, the Company decided to press on alone. It arranged to purchase a site at University and Queen from the Ontario government for CA$16 million. It selected Diamond, Schmitt and Company as the architects. The plan would be to build a theatre that was not grandiose, but would have fine acoustics and storage facilities large enough to handle at least three productions in repertory. The purchase of the site fell through in early 2000, withdrawn by the Ontario government. However, the plan was saved when the federal government announced funding for the project in late 2000, contingent on the provincial government contributing to the project, including the land for the hall. The Ontario government under Mike Harris balked at the donation, stating the land was now valued upwards of CA$35 million, and wanted a compensatory payment of $10-$15 million. When Harris stepped down and Ernie Eves became Ontario premier, the condition was dropped and the land was donated without any strings. This was part of a deal to secure federal money for the Royal Ontario Museum and the Art Gallery of Ontario that was held back by the federal government until the Ontario government agreed to provide funding to the National Ballet and the opera house land.

The COC's new permanent home, the Four Seasons Centre for the Performing Arts, shared with the National Ballet, opened in June 2006 with a gala concert. Nathan Philips Square hosted an outdoor celebration with a simultaneous video feed of the concert. At the Four Seasons, the production was a selection from various operas, with arias by Ben Heppner, Aline Kutan, Allyson McHardy, Adrienne Pieczonka, Gerald Finley, Robert Pomakov, and Brett Polegato. There were choruses by the ensemble and an orchestra interlude, including the finale of Beethoven's Ninth Symphony.

The COC opened its first season at the Four Seasons Centre with the first Canadian production of Wagner's complete Der Ring des Nibelungen. Michael Levine was the designer, and there were four directors: Michael Levine (Das Rheingold), Atom Egoyan (Die Walküre), François Girard (Siegfried), and Tim Albery (Götterdämmerung).

In 2006, Bradshaw's contract as general director was renewed for another 10 years. Bradshaw died of a sudden heart attack on August 15, 2007. In June 2008, Alexander Neef was named the COC's general director; he formally assumed the position in October 2008. In October 2008, Johannes Debus made his debut with the COC as a conductor in a production of Prokofiev's War and Peace, where he earned critical acclaim. In January 2009, the COC announced Debus's appointment as music director. Sandra Horst, who runs the University of Toronto's Opera Division, has long served as the company's chorus master. In 2024, both Horst and Debus were re-signed to extended contracts, continuing through to the 2028/2029 season.

The 2019/2020 COC theatre season was cut short due to the global COVID-19 pandemic, on which the COC ceased all productions after March 2020 due to restrictions on large indoor gatherings. The COC hoped to restart the shortened 2020/2021 theatre season by January 2021, however on October 6, 2020, company management announced that the entire 2020/2021 COC theatre season was cancelled due to the ongoing pandemic. Live performances resumed at the Four Seasons Centre with Verdi's La traviata in April 2022.

Neef became director general of the Paris Opera in September 2020 and was replaced by Briton Perryn Leech in March 2021. In June 2024, Perryn Leech left abruptly and was replaced as interim general director by David C. Ferguson, a retired banker and accountant. Ferguson remained as general director until the end of the 2025/2026 season.

In February 2026, the COC announced Ian Derrer, the general director and CEO of the Dallas Opera, as their general director. He officially assumes the role ahead of the 2026/2027 season. Long time artistic planner and director of production, Roberto Mauro, was also promoted to artistic director during this period.

== Recent productions ==
The five most recent seasons of productions by the Company. Performances at the Four Seasons Centre unless noted.

2021/2022:

Due to the global COVID-19 pandemic, the COC cancelled several planned performances for the 2021/2022 season, but managed to produce ten digital productions and two in-person productions in the spring of 2022.

- La traviata by Giuseppe Verdi
- The Magic Flute by Wolfgang Amadeus Mozart

2022/2023:

- The Flying Dutchman by Richard Wagner
- Carmen by Georges Bizet
- The Marriage of Figaro by Wolfgang Amadeus Mozart
- Salome by Richard Strauss
- Macbeth by Giuseppe Verdi
- Tosca by Giacomo Puccini
- Pomegranate by Kye Marshall and Amanda Hale

2023/2024:

- Fidelio by Ludwig van Beethoven
- La bohème by Giacomo Puccini
- The Cunning Little Vixen by Leoš Janáček
- Don Giovanni by Wolfgang Amadeus Mozart
- Don Pasquale by Gaetano Donizetti
- Medea by Luigi Cherubini
- Aportia Chryptych: A Black Opera for Portia White by HAUI x Sean Mayes

2024/2025:

- Nabucco by Giuseppe Verdi
- Faust by Charles Gounod
- Madama Butterfly by Giacomo Puccini
- La Reine-garçon by Julien Bilodeau and Michel Marc Bouchard
- Wozzeck by Alban Berg
- Eugene Onegin by Pyotr Ilyich Tchaikovsky
- Cavalleria rusticana by Pietro Mascagni

2025/2026:

- Roméo et Juliette by Charles Gounod
- Orfeo ed Euridice by Christoph Willibald Gluck
- Rigoletto by Giuseppe Verdi
- The Barber of Seville by Gioachino Rossini
- Bluebeard's Castle/Erwartung by Béla Bartók/Arnold Schoenberg
- Werther by Jules Massenet

2026/2027:

- La traviata by Giuseppe Verdi
- Così fan tutte by Wolfgang Amadeus Mozart
- The Turn of the Screw by Benjamin Britten
- Ariadne auf Naxos by Richard Strauss
- Empire of Wild by Ian Cusson and Cherie Dimaline
- The Elixir of Love by Gaetano Donizetti
- Come Closer by Ryan Trew and Rachel Krehm

== Notable members ==
- Cornelis Opthof (bass-baritone), sang with the company for fifty years.
