= Ben Lloyd-Hughes =

British actor (born 1988)

- Born: Benedict Lloyd-Hughes; 14 April 1988 (age 38); Westminster, London, England
- Education: Guildhall School of Music and Drama
- Occupation: Actor
- Years active: 2002–present
- Spouse: Emily Berrington (m. 2019)
- Parent(s): Lucy Appleby; Timothy Lloyd-Hughes
- Relatives: Henry Lloyd-Hughes (brother)

Benedict Lloyd-Hughes (born 14 April 1988) is a British actor.

== Early life ==
Lloyd-Hughes was born in 1988 in London, the son of Lucy Appleby and Timothy Lloyd-Hughes. He attended St Paul's School, London. In 2011 he finished his acting training at the Guildhall School of Music and Drama in London.

== Career ==
He is known for portraying Josh Stock in the British series Skins (2007) and for his role as Will in the film Divergent (2014). He plays Tsar Alexander in the 2016 BBC television series War & Peace, and Greg in the 2020 series Industry. Lloyd-Hughes joined the main cast of period drama Sanditon (based on Jane Austen's unfinished novel) in 2022. He played Mark Bolland in the fifth and sixth seasons of the historical drama television series The Crown.

== Personal life ==
Lloyd-Hughes has two older brothers, actor Henry Lloyd-Hughes, and record executive Theo Lloyd-Hughes. Henry and Ben acted in Miliband of Brothers, a satirical docu-drama centered around the 2010 Labour leadership election.

Lloyd-Hughes is married to actress Emily Berrington. They met at drama school. Fred Macpherson, lead singer of the band Spector and formerly of Les Incompétents and Ox.Eagle.Lion.Man, is his cousin.

== Filmography ==
=== Film ===
| Year | Title | Role | Notes |
|---|---|---|---|
| 2009 | Tormented | Jez | |
| 2009 | The First Days of Spring | Young Ethan | |
| 2010 | Miliband of Brothers | Ed Miliband | Together with Henry Lloyd-Hughes (brother) |
| 2012 | The Scapegoat | Myerson | |
| 2012 | Great Expectations | Bentley Drummel | |
| 2013 | Tom & Issy | Eric | Short film |
| 2014 | Divergent | Will | |
| 2015 | The Divergent Series: Insurgent | Will | |
| 2016 | Me Before You | Rupert Collins | |
| 2017 | Breathe | Dr. Don McQueen | |
| 2018 | Malevolent | Jackson | |
| 2019 | A Serial Killer's Guide to Life | Chuck Knoah | |
| 2022 | The King's Daughter | Jean-Michel Lintillac | |
| 2022 | The Stranger in Our Bed | Tom | |
| 2025 | Steve | Julian | |

=== Television ===
| Year | Title | Role | Notes |
|---|---|---|---|
| 2005 | Love Soup | Teenage Boy | |
| 2006 | Genie in the House | Wolfgang Amadeus Mozart | |
| 2006 | A Touch of Frost | Student | |
| 2007 | Casualty | Colm Roach | |
| 2007 | Skins | Josh Stock | 2 episodes |
| 2008 | Roman Mysteries | Gaius Valerius Flaccus | 4 episodes |
| 2008 | Personal Affairs | Dominic Fitzwallace | |
| 2011 | The Hour | Ralph Sherwin | 2 episodes |
| 2011 | Young James Herriot | Rob McAloon | |
| 2015 | Life in Squares | Bunny (younger) | 2 episodes |
| 2015 | The Eichmann Show | Alan Rosenthal | |
| 2016 | War & Peace | Tsar Alexander | 3 episodes |
| 2016 | National Treasure | Freddie | |
| 2020, 2024 | Industry | Greg Grayson | 7 episodes |
| 2022 | The Ipcress File | James | Mini-Series |
| 2022–2023 | The Crown | Mark Bolland | 6 episodes |
| 2022 | This England | Ben Gascoigne | 5 episodes |
| 2022–2023 | Sanditon | Alexander Colbourne | Season 2–3 |
| 2024 | The Next Level | Josh | 6 Episodes |
| 2025 | I Fought the Law | Franz Muller QC | 2 Episodes |
| 2026 | Death in Paradise | Jez Gorman | S15, E5 |

=== Video games ===
| Year | Title | Role | Notes |
|---|---|---|---|
| 2019 | GreedFall | Constantin D'Orsay | Voice |
| 2025 | Lies of P | Brain in a Vat / Crusher Puppet / Sweeper Survivor | Voice |

=== Theatre ===
| Year | Title | Role |
|---|---|---|
| 2012 | The Way of the World | Mirabell |
