= Henry Lloyd-Hughes =

British actor (born 1985)

- Lloyd-Hughes in 2004
- Born: Henry Alexander Lloyd-Hughes; 11 August 1985 (age 41); London, United Kingdom
- Occupation: Actor
- Years active: 2004–present
- Known for: Playing Roger Davies and Mark Donovan
- Relatives: Ben Lloyd-Hughes (brother)

Henry Lloyd-Hughes (born 11 August 1985) is a British actor. His credits include Harry Potter and the Goblet of Fire (2005), Unrelated (2007), The Inbetweeners (2008–2010), Miliband of Brothers (2010), Weekender (2011), Anna Karenina (2012), Parade's End (2012), Indian Summers (2015), Les Misérables (2018), Killing Eve (2019), The English Game (2020), Ragdoll (2021) and The Irregulars (2021).

== Early life and education ==
Henry Alexander Lloyd-Hughes was born in London, the son of actress Lucy Appleby (A Stitch in Time) and Timothy Lloyd-Hughes, who worked for Deutsche Bank. He was educated at St Paul's School, London and has two younger brothers, record executive Theo Lloyd-Hughes and actor Ben Lloyd-Hughes. Both Henry and Ben acted in Miliband of Brothers. Fred Macpherson, lead singer of the band Spector, and formerly of Les Incompétents and Ox.Eagle.Lion.Man, is his cousin.

== Career ==
=== Screen ===
Lloyd-Hughes first appeared in the TV series Murphy's Law (2004) before playing Roger Davies in the 2005 film Harry Potter and the Goblet of Fire (2005). He appeared alongside Tom Hiddleston in Joanna Hogg's film Unrelated in 2007.

From 2008 to 2010 he played school bully Mark Donovan in the British sitcom The Inbetweeners. He reprised the role in the film The Inbetweeners Movie in 2011. In 2010, he portrayed former British Labour Party politician David Miliband in the TV film documentary Miliband of Brothers.

In 2011, he starred in the film Dimensions as Stephen, a brilliant young scientist who lives in England in the 1920s.

In the 2012 epic romantic drama film Anna Karenina, he played Burisov alongside Keira Knightley and Aaron Taylor-Johnson. In 2013, he starred in the film Hello Carter with Jodie Whittaker.

Lloyd-Hughes played Charles Bovary in the drama film Madame Bovary with Mia Wasikowska in the title role and which was released in 2014.

In 2021, he appeared as Sherlock Holmes in the Netflix series, The Irregulars.

=== Theatre ===
Lloyd-Hughes has appeared in numerous theatre productions, including Rope, The Miracle, Punk Rock, and The Changeling.

In 2012, he starred as Dimitri Mitropoulos in the play Posh, which played at the Duke of York's Theatre. Michael Billington of The Guardian said of Lloyd-Hughes's performance that he "impresses as a wealthy Greek who aims to be more English than the English".

== Personal life ==
Hughes and his family are all supporters of West London football club Queens Park Rangers.

== Filmography ==
Key
†	Denotes films that have not yet been released

=== Film ===
Year	Title	Role	Notes
2005	Harry Potter and the Goblet of Fire	Roger Davies	
2007	Unrelated	Jack	
2008	Telstar: The Joe Meek Story	Teddy Boy	
2010	Into the Night	Ollie	Short film
2011	Dimensions	Stephen	
2011	Anonymous	Bear Baiter	
2011	The Inbetweeners Movie	Mark Donovan	
2011	Acting = Intensity + Rebellion	The Actor	Short film
2011	Weekender	Matt	
2011	R	Rick	Short film
2011	Colonel Gaddafi: The Lost Footage	Muamar	Short film
2012	A Fantastic Fear of Everything	PC Taser	
2012	Anna Karenina	Burisov	
2013	Hello Carter	Nicholas Renfrew	
2014	Insomniacs	Theo	Short film
2014	Residents	Jack	Short film
2014	Madame Bovary	Charles Bovary	
2015	Man Up	Daniel	
2016	Now You See Me 2	Allen Scott-Frank	
2025	The Thursday Murder Club	Bogdan	
2026	Disclosure Day	Casper Boyd	
2026	Ebenezer	Topper	

=== Television ===
Year	Title	Role	Notes
2004	Murphy's Law	Jenson Dawlish	Episode: "Convent"
2005	The Rotters' Club	Culpepper	Main role
2007	M.I.High	Kyle Whittaker	Episode: "Nerd Alert"
2008–2010	The Inbetweeners	Mark Donovan	Recurring role
2009	Not Safe for Work	Ray Ray	Television film
2010	Dirty Sexy Funny	Various Roles	Main role
2010	Miliband of Brothers	David Miliband	Television film
2011	Shirley	Kenneth Hume	Television film
2012	The Cricklewood Greats	Paulo DeMarco	Television film
2012	Parade's End	Captain Notting	Episode: "Episode Five"
2013	Ambassadors	Simon Broughton	Episode: "The Rabbit Never Escapes"
2014	The Great War: The People's Story	Duff Cooper	Episode: "Episode Four"
2015–2016	Indian Summers	Ralph Whelan	Main role
2017	Will	Edward Alleyn	Episode: "Cowards Die Many Times"
2018	Les Misérables	Pontmercy	Main role
2018	The Durrells	Durant	1 episode
2019	The Inbetweeners: Fwends Reunited	Himself	Television special
2019	Killing Eve	Aaron Peel	Main role (season 2)
2020	The English Game	Alfred Lyttleton	Recurring role
2021	The Irregulars	Sherlock Holmes	Recurring role
2021	Ragdoll	DS Nathan Rose	Main role

== Theatre ==
Year	Title	Role	Venue
2008	The Miracle	Lorenzo	The National
2009	Rope	Kenneth Raglan	Almeida Theatre
2009	Punk Rock	Bennet Francis	Lyric Hammersmith
2012	The Changeling	Lord Tomazo / Antonio	Young Vic
2012	Posh	Dimitri Mitropoulos	Duke of York's Theatre

== Radio ==
Year	Title	Role	Channel
2013	The Means to an End	Dustin	BBC Radio 4

== Video games ==
Year	Title	Role
2014	Dragon Age: Inquisition	Talwyn/Servis/Crestwood Grey Warden (voices)
2018	World of Warcraft: Battle for Azeroth	Flynn Fairwind (voice)
