= Never Fade Away =

Never Fade Away may refer to:

- Never Fade Away (album), by John O'Callaghan
- "Never Fade Away" (song), by Spector
- "Never Fade Away", by Air Supply from the album Air Supply
- "Never Fade Away", by Refused performing as SAMURAI for the soundtrack of Cyberpunk 2077
