= The Mapmaker (film) =

- Directed by: Stephen Johnson
- Screenplay by: Scott James Bassett
- Produced by: Scott James Bassett
- Starring: Jenny Agutter; Charles Dance; Rachel Hurd-Wood; Harry Eden
- Cinematography: Sue Gibson
- Edited by: Andrew Jadavji
- Music by: Barrington Pheloung
- Production company: Flame 47, MJZ
- Release date: 21 September 2012
- Running time: 15 minutes
- Country: United Kingdom
- Language: English

The Mapmaker is a 2012 English drama film. Jenny Agutter and Rachel Hurd-Wood play the role of Isabel. Charles Dance and Harry Eden play the role of Rowan.

== Plot ==
When Rowan and Isabel return to the coastline where they spent a blissful summer, almost fifty years before, it is with a very different purpose. Isabel is dying; she wants it to be here, now. As darkness falls, their past collides with the present and Rowan is called upon to make a sacrifice that will preserve their unity forever. Passionate, searing and poetic 'The Mapmaker' examines a life and love that, just like all of ours, is all too fleeting.

== Cast ==
- Jenny Agutter as Isabel
- Charles Dance as Rowan
- Harry Eden as Young Rowan
- Rachel Hurd-Wood as Young Isabel

== Reception ==
The Mapmaker had a successful run on the festival circuit and is critically acclaimed. The film had its international première at The Seattle International Film Festival and its British première at The Raindance Film Festival where it was nominated for Best British Short Film in 2012.
