= List of number-one DVDs of 2006 (UK) =

The UK Video Charts published the top-selling DVD films for each week during 2006.

== Chart history ==
Issue date	Number-one DVD
January 2	Wedding Crashers
January 9	The Island
January 16	The Longest Yard
January 23	Stealth
January 30	The Business
February 6	Pride & Prejudice
February 13	Nanny McPhee
February 20	Wallace & Gromit: The Curse of the Were-Rabbit
February 27	Wallace & Gromit: The Curse of the Were-Rabbit
March 6	Wallace & Gromit: The Curse of the Were-Rabbit
March 13	The Constant Gardener
March 20	Harry Potter and the Goblet of Fire
March 27	Harry Potter and the Goblet of Fire
April 3	The Chronicles of Narnia: The Lion, the Witch and the Wardrobe
April 10	King Kong
April 17	King Kong
April 24	Brokeback Mountain
May 1	Brokeback Mountain
May 8	March of the Penguins
May 15	Jarhead
May 22	Walk the Line
May 29	Chicken Little
June 5	Memoirs of a Geisha
June 12	Munich
June 19	Underworld: Evolution
June 26	The Hills Have Eyes
July 3	Alien Autopsy
July 10	Lucky Number Slevin
July 17	Pink Panther
July 24	Final Destination 3
July 31	V for Vendetta
August 7	Hostel
August 14	Scary Movie 4
August 21	Scary Movie 4
August 28	An American Haunting
September 4	Silent Hill
September 11	Little Britain Season 3
September 18	The Wild
September 25	The Shawshank Redemption
October 2	X-Men: The Last Stand
October 9	X-Men: The Last Stand
October 16	The Da Vinci Code
October 23	Ice Age: The Meltdown
October 30	The Fast and the Furious: Tokyo Drift
November 6	Mission: Impossible III
November 13	Stormbreaker
November 20	Pirates of the Caribbean: Dead Man's Chest
November 27	Cars
December 4	High School Musical
December 11	High School Musical
December 18	Pirates of the Caribbean: Dead Man's Chest
December 25	Deal or No Deal: The DVD Game
