= Rachel Hurd-Wood =

English actress (born 1990)

- Born: 17 August 1990 (age 35); London, England
- Occupation: Actress
- Years active: 2002–present
- Spouse: Russ Bain (m. 2017)
- Children: 2

Rachel Hurd-Wood (born 17 August 1990) is an English actress. She is known for her performances in the fantasy adventure film Peter Pan (2003), the supernatural horror film An American Haunting (2005), the thriller film Perfume: The Story of a Murderer (2006), the dark fantasy horror film Dorian Gray (2009), the action-adventure war film Tomorrow, When the War Began (2010) and the BBC Three television series Clique (2017–18).

== Early life ==
=== Background ===
Hurd-Wood was born in the Streatham district of South London, England, the daughter of Philip and Sarah Hurd-Wood. She lived in London until the age of eight, when she and her family moved to a Victorian cottage in Godalming, Surrey.

Hurd-Wood has a younger brother, Patrick who appeared with her in Peter Pan as one of the sleeping children in the "I Do Believe In Fairies" scene. He also plays the role of Samuel Crowthorn alongside his sister in her later film, Solomon Kane in which she plays Meredith Crowthorn.

Her father's work involves performing, writing scripts and doing voice-overs for commercials. He appears in one of her films, An American Haunting, as one of the guests in the Christmas party scene towards the beginning of the film. She joined a drama club in her school and took part in its stage production during her second year. Hurd-Wood dispelled the false rumour that her uncle is Hugh Laurie in a 2009 September–October interview for the magazine Little White Lies: The An Education Issue and then again in a 2010 live Myspace web chat for the film Tomorrow, When the War Began. "My uncle lives in Wales and is an artist", she says.

=== Education ===
Hurd-Wood attended Rodborough Technology College in Milford, Surrey from 2001 to 2006. She had tutored lessons during the filming of Peter Pan in Australia during 2002 to 2003 as her work lasted for a span of 8 to 9 months. She later attended Godalming College from 2006 to 2008 to study for her A-Levels in Art, English Literature, Psychology and Philosophy.

Hurd-Wood had considered becoming a marine biologist because of her love for dolphins. She gave up on the idea when she discovered that it would require studying science because she thought she was not very good at it.

Hurd-Wood became interested in working with children who have special needs or disabilities. Hurd-Wood began studying linguistics at University College London in 2008, but left the course after a year, before travelling to Australia for the filming of Tomorrow, When the War Began, when she decided to focus entirely on her career in acting.

== Career ==
=== Acting ===
Hurd-Wood's career in acting started when she was picked for the role of Wendy Darling for the 2003 feature film Peter Pan, after her grandparents spotted a television clip that said P. J. Hogan was searching for a "young English rose". She travelled to Gold Coast, Australia for eight months of filming during 2002 and 2003. Her performance received good reviews and was nominated for a Saturn Award for Best Performance by a Younger Actor, and a Young Artist Award for Best Performance in a Feature Film – Leading Young Actress.

Hurd-Wood portrayed the character Imogen Helhoughton in the 2004 TV film Sherlock Holmes and the Case of the Silk Stocking, as a 13-year-old victim of a serial killer. Also in 2004, she had a major role of Betsy Bell in the thriller An American Haunting, as a girl who is haunted and tormented by an unrelenting demon. Her performance came in for some praise, one critic remarking, "The actors are the saving grace… Hurd-Wood a mix of radiant approaching womanhood and animal terror. Their impassioned performances make you really care what happens to these people…"; another reviewer comments, "Rachel Hurd-Wood… delivers a fantastic and nuanced performance as Betsy Bell, the very central role that essentially carries the entire movie." Hurd-Wood was nominated for the 2006 Teen Choice Awards in the category Movie – Choice Scream for her role.

In 2005 she appeared in an adaptation of the best-selling novel by German writer Patrick Süskind, Perfume: The Story of a Murderer. Set in 18th century France, Hurd-Wood portrayed Laura Richis, the red-headed virgin daughter of a politically connected merchant played by Alan Rickman. She had her brunette hair dyed red. She was nominated for the "Best Supporting Actress" award at the 33rd Saturn Awards by The Academy of Science Fiction, Fantasy and Horror Films for her role.

The year 2007 saw Hurd-Wood starring as a waitress in the music video for the song "A Little Bit" by Madeleine Peyroux. She appeared alongside the musicians in the music video for "Fatherhood/Motherhood" by Ox.Eagle.Lion.Man.

In the 2008 film Solomon Kane, she played Meredith Crowthorn, a Puritan captured by a band of marauders who killed her family and whom Kane sought to rescue. Her younger brother Patrick appears in the film as her brother Samuel.

Later in the year she acted in the film Dorian Gray based on the Oscar Wilde novel, The Picture of Dorian Gray. She was in the small but key role of the young budding actress Sibyl Vane, with whom Gray falls in love. She was studying in the first year of the linguistics course at UCL while working in this film.

In her first contemporary role, Hurd-Wood was cast as Corrie Mackenzie, one of the principal characters in the 2009 Australian action-adventure film Tomorrow, When the War Began, based on the novel by John Marsden. (The novel was one of the books she read while being tutored for the filming of Peter Pan.) At this point, she discontinued studying for a Linguistics degree to concentrate full-time on acting. She learned an Australian accent for the role. The film became the highest-grossing movie for that year in Australia.

Hurd-Wood portrayed the lead character Mae-West O'Mara in the 2010 film Hideaways, narrating a story to her six-year-old daughter, about the strange powers of the men in the Furlong family. Her performance was well received by critics, calling her "charismatic" and "...the heart and soul of the film, the one the girls will relate to and the guys are going to love...". "If the film works it's due in large part to her stellar performance", says a reviewer. Another reviewer commented, "When the light hits Mae's eyes, it's like you can see whole worlds being born and being destroyed ad infinitum ... Hurd-Wood's chemistry with Treadaway is instant, the two are a joy to watch, and their romance is the heart of the film ... [Rachel's and Harry's] two great central performances". Later in the year, she played the younger version of the character Isabel, played by Jenny Agutter, in the short film The Mapmaker. Also in the same year, she was featured in the music video for "Revolver" by Warehouse Republic.

She played the role of the babysitter in the 2011 teaser for a proposed feature-length film, Let's Go Play at the Adams, based on the book of the same name by Mendal Johnson. She next played the role of the daughter of the character Teddy, in the short film It Ends Here, directed by her friend Zimon Drake.

In 2012, Hurd-Wood played the female lead role of Elisabeth James in the film Highway to Dhampus, a story about the effect foreigners in Nepal and Nepali expatriates have on the locals. Later in the year, she narrates the words of her fashion-designer friend, Matthew Williamson, in an advertisement/mini-film. She next starred alongside the singers Tyler James and Kano in the music video for the single "Worry About You" (feat. Kano) by Tyler James.

=== Modeling ===
Hurd-Wood posed for the publicity and poster material for Volstead Putsch, an underground bohemian party organised by The Triumvirate of Fez at the London's Volstead Club in 2008. The same year she posed for Raw Riddim Records promoting their merchandise such as chains, T-shirts, hoodies, etc.

=== Film festivals ===
Hurd-Wood was a member of the international expert jury panel for "European debuts" at the "52nd International Film Festival for Children and Youth" at the Zlín Film Festival held from 27 May 2012 to 3 June 2012 at Zlín in the Czech Republic. 27

=== Charity support ===
Hurd-Wood signed for World Famous StarCards, a charity supporting the Great Ormond Street Hospital (GOSH) Children's Charity, at the world charity premiere of the movie Peter Pan in London on 9 December 2003. Her autographed card was auctioned in 2009. It tops the chart for the most popular signing, according to Paul Brett, founder of the StarCards charity.

Hurd-Wood along with other celebrity supporters of the charity Shooting Star CHASE, Keeley Hawes, Matthew MacFadyen and Max Clifford joined more than 50 children with life-limiting illnesses and their families for the event on Sunday, 20 December 2009. The charity worked with Coca-Cola and the Merlin Group, which runs Alton Towers, Chessington World of Adventures and the London Eye, to transform Christopher's (CHASE) Hospice in Guildford, Surrey into a winter wonderland and gave the children at hospice a wonderful Christmas surprise.

== Personal life ==
During filming for Peter Pan, Hurd-Wood briefly shared a childhood crush with co-star Jeremy Sumpter. Hurd-Wood married Scottish actor Russ Bain in Camden Town in November 2017. She gave birth to their son in May 2018. Previously based in North London, they have since moved. She gave birth to their daughter in April 2021.

== Filmography ==
=== Film ===
| Year | Title | Role | Notes |
|---|---|---|---|
| 2003 | Peter Pan | Wendy Darling | |
| 2004 | Sherlock Holmes and the Case of the Silk Stocking | Imogen Helhoughton | |
| 2005 | An American Haunting | Betsy Bell | |
| 2006 | Perfume: The Story of a Murderer | Laura Richis | |
| 2009 | Solomon Kane | Meredith Crowthorn | |
| 2009 | Dorian Gray | Sibyl Vane | |
| 2010 | Tomorrow, When the War Began | Corrie Mackenzie | |
| 2011 | Hideaways | Mae-West O'Mara | |
| 2011 | The Mapmaker | Young Isabel | Short film |
| 2014 | Highway to Dhampus | Elizabeth James | |
| 2015 | Second Origin | Alba | |
| 2017 | Beautiful Devils | Darcy | |
| 2019 | For Love or Money | Kendra | |
| 2024 | The First Omen | Katherine Thorn | |

=== Television ===
| Year | Title | Role | Notes |
|---|---|---|---|
| 2015 | Home Fires | Kate Campbell | 2 episodes |
| 2017–2018 | Clique | Rachel Maddox | Main role |

=== Music video appearances ===
| Year | Title | Artist | Notes |
|---|---|---|---|
| 2006 | "A Little Bit" | Madeleine Peyroux | Appeared as a waitress |
| 2007 | "Fatherhood/Motherhood" | Ox.Eagle.Lion.Man | Appeared with L.S.C. Oakeshott |
| 2010 | "Revolver" | Warehouse Republic | Appeared with Henry Leroy-Salta |
| 2013 | "Worry About You" | Tyler James | Appeared as James' girlfriend |

== Accolades ==
| Award | Year | Category | Work | Result |
|---|---|---|---|---|
| Las Vegas Film Critics Society | 2004 | Best Youth in Film | Peter Pan | Nominated |
| Saturn Awards | 2004 | Best Performance by a Younger Actor | Peter Pan | Nominated |
| Saturn Awards | 2007 | Best Supporting Actress | Perfume: The Story of a Murderer | Nominated |
| Teen Choice Awards | 2006 | Choice Movie: Scream Scene | An American Haunting | Nominated |
| Young Artist Awards | 2004 | Best Performance in a Feature Film - Leading Young Actress | Peter Pan | Nominated |
