= Enjoy It While It Lasts =

Studio album by Spector
- Released: 13 August 2012
- Recorded: 2011–2012
- Genre: Indie rock
- Label: Fiction

Spector chronology
Enjoy It While It Lasts (2012)	Moth Boys (2015)

Singles from Enjoy It While It Lasts
- 1. "Never Fade Away" Released: 29 April 2011; 2. "What You Wanted" Released: 19 September 2011; 3. "Grey Shirt and Tie" Released: 5 December 2011; 4. "Chevy Thunder" Released: 26 January 2012; 5. "Celestine" Released: 20 May 2012; 6. "Friday Night, Don't Ever Let It End" Released: 31 December 2012

Enjoy It While It Lasts is the debut studio album by English indie rock band Spector, released on 13 August 2012. It follows the singles "Chevy Thunder" and "Celestine", which were released on Luv Luv Luv Records during 2012. The album reached number 12 in the UK Albums Chart, and went to number 1 on the Official Record Store Chart on the week of its release.

== Critical reception ==
Professional ratings
Review scores
Source	Rating
AllMusic	2.5/5 stars
BBC Music	(mixed)
Digital Spy	4/5 stars
The Guardian	3/5 stars
The Independent	4/5 stars
NME	8/10 stars
The Observer	3/5 stars
Pitchfork	2.6/10
The Quietus	(positive)
Time Out London	4/5 stars
Virgin Media	4/5 stars

Upon its release, Enjoy It While It Lasts received mixed reviews. NME praised its harking back to a lost age of "indie disco" akin to the triumvirate of The Killers, The Strokes and Razorlight. Yet from The Guardian there was a sense of disapproval at the seemingly shallow façade of "makeweight chugging alt-rock". Particular attention has been paid to the lyrics, with The Quietus describing "whip-smart words", while according to The Observer's Hermione Hoby, they create a "unique blend of hubris and humour." Digital Spy also praised the lyrical work of lead singer Fred MacPherson, commenting "there's a self-deprecating wit to his wordplay that makes Spector all the more bewitching."

=== Accolades ===
Publication	Country	Accolade	Year	Rank
NME	UK	Best Albums of 2012 (Editors' Pick)	2012	No. 26

== Track listing ==
All tracks are written by Frederick MacPherson, except where noted

No.	Title	Writer(s)	Length
1.	"True Love (For Now)"		3:38
2.	"Chevy Thunder"		3:47
3.	"Grey Shirt and Tie"		3:20
4.	"Twenty Nothing"	MacPherson, Christopher Burman	3:26
5.	"Friday Night, Don't Ever Let It End"		3:49
6.	"Lay Low"		3:18
7.	"Upset Boulevard"		3:45
8.	"No Adventure"		3:36
9.	"What You Wanted"		3:07
10.	"Celestine"		3:42
11.	"Grim Reefer"		2:52
12.	"Never Fade Away"		3:42

== Chart performance ==
Chart	Peak position
UK Albums Chart	12

== Personnel ==
- Fred MacPherson – vocals
- Chris Burman – guitar
- Tom Shickle – bass guitar
- Jed Cullen – guitar, synthesizer
- Danny Blandy – drums
