= Miliband of Brothers =

- Written by: David Quantick
- Directed by: Richard Curson Smith
- Starring: Henry Lloyd-Hughes; Ben Lloyd-Hughes
- Country of origin: United Kingdom
- Original language: English

Production
- Production company: Blink Films

Original release
- Release: 2010

Miliband of Brothers is a 2010 British satirical docu-drama directed by Richard Curson Smith and following the lives and careers of British politicians David Miliband and younger brother Ed, who at the time were both contesting the 2010 Labour leadership contest. Written by David Quantick, the programme was first shown on More4. It was produced by the same production team as the similar 2009 documentary When Boris Met Dave.

== Premise ==
The film charts the Miliband brothers' paths into politics interspersed with interviews from Tony Benn, Neil Kinnock and Oona King amongst friends and teachers, looking into how they both ended up with jobs in the cabinets of Tony Blair and Gordon Brown.

David Miliband was played by Henry Lloyd-Hughes and Ed by his brother Ben Lloyd-Hughes. The title, a pun on the phrase "Band of Brothers" was inspired by a comment by Caitlin Moran's "Celebrity Watch" column.

== Reception ==
Sam Wollaston, reviewing the production in The Guardian wrote: "There are a few funny moments (I quite liked the Top Trumps – Leon Trotsky, revolutionary status: 82 points). Mostly it's just very hammy and very silly, as the Tory one was."

== Cast ==
- Samantha Morton as the Narrator (voice)
- Henry Lloyd-Hughes as David Miliband
- Ben Lloyd-Hughes as Ed Miliband
- Katherine Kanter as Marion Miliband
- Michael Bertenshaw as Ralph Miliband
- Harrison Edwards as Young David Miliband
- Jem Savin as Young Ed Miliband
- Lucy Manning as herself
- Tom Butcher as Political Aide
- Mark Perry as Ralph's Friend
- Gareth Aled as Activist
- Lara Goodison as Sloane Student
- Tony Benn as himself – Family friend
- Julian Birkett as David's English teacher
- Bill Bush as Family friend / Former Head of Research Downing Street
- Jeremy Corbyn as Family friend (as Jeremy Corbyn MP)
- Marko Attila Hoare as Ed's childhood friend
- Oona King as Haverstock pupil 1979–86 / Former Labour MP
- Neil Kinnock as himself – Labour leader 1983–92 (as Lord Kinnock)
- Lance Price as Former Deputy Dir of Communications, Downing Street
- Andrew Rawnsley as himself – Political commentator
- Marc Stears as himself – Ed's university friend
- David Upshal as himself – David's university friend
- Hilary Wainwright as Family friend
