= Weekender (film) =

2011 film

- Directed by: Karl Golden
- Written by: Chris Coghill
- Produced by: Ian Brady; Stephen Salter; Robert Walak
- Starring: Jack O'Connell; Henry Lloyd-Hughes
- Cinematography: John Conroy
- Music by: James Edward Barker
- Production company: Benchmark Films
- Distributed by: Momentum Pictures
- Release dates: 23 June 2011 (Edinburgh International Film Festival); 2 September 2011 (United Kingdom)
- Running time: 90 minutes
- Country: United Kingdom
- Language: English

Weekender is a 2011 British drama film directed by Karl Golden and starring Jack O'Connell, Henry Lloyd-Hughes, Ben Batt and Emily Barclay. It was written by Chris Coghill.

== Plot ==
1990: The rave scene has arrived from Ibiza and warehouse parties are exploding across the United Kingdom, bringing phenomenal wealth to the organisers. In Manchester, best mates Matt and Dylan are in their early twenties and long to be more than just punters. As the government moves to outlaw the scene, it's now or never and they quickly rise through the ranks to join the promoting elite. They are taken on a wild journey from the exclusive VIP rooms of London clubs to the outrageous parties in Ibiza super-villas and the hedonism of Amsterdam. It's everything they dreamed of and more. But as their success continues to grow, they attract a more dark and sinister world. Matt and Dylan start to drift apart as they are forced to question the dreams they set out to achieve and their once solid friendship.

== Cast ==
- Jack O'Connell as Dylan
- Henry Lloyd-Hughes as Matt
- Ben Batt as John Anderson
- Emily Barclay as Claire
- Tom Meeten as Captain Acid/Mickey Muddle
- Stephen Wight as Gary Mac
- Zawe Ashton as Sarah
- Dean Andrews as Sargent Thompson
- Craig Izzard as Harry
- Sam Hazeldine as Maurice
- Richard Riddell as Craig
- Perry Fitzpatrick as Chris

== Reception ==
Weekender received generally negative reviews, currently holding a 9% rating on review aggregator website Rotten Tomatoes based on 11 reviews. On Metacritic, based on five critics, the film has a 35/100 rating, signifying "generally unfavorable reviews".

Peter Bradshaw of The Guardian wrote, "Doing justice to the rave scene on screen isn't easy, though Justin Kerrigan managed it with charm and wit in his 1999 movie Human Traffic. This film, sadly, is something else again: it's rammed with cliches and silliness and conforms to a lot of stereotypes, the most suspect being the obligatory scene in Ibiza whose only purpose is to show loads of young women with no tops on."
