= For Love or Money (2019 film) =

2019 UK film directed by Mark Murphy

- Directed by: Mark Murphy
- Written by: Mark Murphy; Sabrina Lepage
- Produced by: Alan Latham; Mark Murphy; Eric Woollard-White; Kirsty Bell; Jason Garrett; Victor Glynn; Geoffrey Iles; Robert Kazinsky
- Starring: Robert Kazinsky; Samantha Barks; Ed Speleers; Rachel Hurd-Wood
- Cinematography: Joan Bordera
- Music by: Simone Vallecorsa
- Production companies: Goldfinch Studios; Solar Productions
- Distributed by: GSP Studios
- Release date: February 14, 2019
- Running time: 95 minutes
- Country: United Kingdom
- Language: English

For Love or Money (a.k.a. The Revenger: An Unromantic Comedy) is a 2019 British romantic comedy film directed by Mark Murphy, starring Robert Kazinsky and Samantha Barks.

== Plot ==
Mark, a socially awkward but successful entrepreneur, has been infatuated with Connie since their school days. The two reconnect years later at the funeral of Connie’s boyfriend. Despite Mark’s attempts to remind her of their shared history, Connie has no memory of him. Before leaving, Mark gives her his business card.

The card is seen by Johnny, a former classmate, who discovers that Mark’s tech start-up is about to be acquired for £20 million. Seeing an opportunity, Johnny convinces Connie to seduce Mark, marry him, and then divorce him to claim half of his fortune. Connie successfully charms Mark, leading to a whirlwind engagement and her moving into his home.

However, the scheme unravels when Mark sees incriminating text messages between Connie and Johnny. He also finds out that Connie and Johnny were sleeping together. Devastated, Mark enlists the help of his roommate Tim and Connie’s estranged former best friend, Kendra - who holds a grudge after Connie slept with her fiancé. Together, they hatch a counter-plan to make Connie’s life a misery. They subject Connie to a series of escalating pranks and humiliations, including replacing her shampoo with hair removal cream, staging public embarrassments and forcing her to choose an undersized green child’s bridesmaid dress for their wedding.

Despite the psychological warfare, Connie remains steadfast, driven by Johnny's pressure and the promise of the payout. On the wedding day, however, Connie discovers an old, heartfelt poem Mark wrote for her when they were children. Overcome with genuine guilt and a change of heart, she arrives at the altar wearing the green dress but stops the ceremony. She confesses that she knows about his wealth and intended to con him.

Mark reveals that he has known about her plan for a long time but was willing to go through with the marriage because his love for her was real. Though they decide to part ways, the film ends with a voiceover from Mark, expressing optimism that he will eventually win her over now that their relationship is finally based on the truth.

== Cast ==
- Robert Kazinsky as Mark
- Samantha Barks as Connie
- Ed Speleers as Johnny, a childhood schoolmate of both Mark and Connie
- Rachel Hurd-Wood as Kendra, Connie's former best friend
- Tony Way as Tim, Mark's roommate
- Ivan Kaye as Patrick, Connie's father
- Anna Chancellor as Carol, Connie's mother
- Tanya Reynolds as Alexa, Connie's Sister
- David Hargreaves as Priest

== Reception ==
On review aggregator website Rotten Tomatoes, the film holds an approval rating of 69% based on 10 reviews. Frazer MacDonald from Film Inquiry called it a "A bare-bones, functional comedy", while Tori Brazier from Flickering Myth gave it a rating of 3 stars.
