= 2006 Teen Choice Awards =

American awards ceremony held in California

- Date: August 20, 2006
- Location: Gibson Amphitheatre, Universal City, California
- Hosted by: Dane Cook and Jessica Simpson

Television/radio coverage
- Network: Fox

The 2006 Teen Choice Awards ceremony was held on August 20, 2006, at the Gibson Amphitheatre, Universal City, California. The event was hosted by Dane Cook and Jessica Simpson, and featured performances by Nelly Furtado and Timbaland, Rihanna, and Kevin Federline, who made his television performance debut as the night's headlining act.

Fall Out Boy was the most-awarded nominee in the Music categories, winning three awards for Choice Single, Rock Group, and Rock Track respectively. Pirates of the Caribbean: Dead Man's Chest led the film nominees with six awards, including for Choice Action Adventure. High School Musical topped the television nominees, also earning three wins, including Choice Comedy/Musical. The Courage Award was presented to Jason McElwain, a high school basketball team manager with autism, for his athletic performance at the end of a division game that won his team the match.

== Performers ==
- Nelly Furtado and Timbaland – "Promiscuous"
- Rihanna – "SOS"
- Kevin Federline – "Lose Control"

== Presenters ==
- Chad Michael Murray and Jaime Pressly – presented Choice Movie Actress: Drama/Action Adventure
- Jared Padalecki – introduced Marlon Wayans
- Marlon Wayans – presented Choice Myspace Video
- Jessica Alba and Wilmer Valderrama – presented Choice Movie: Liplock
- Dax Shepard and Rachel Bilson – presented Choice Music: V-Cast Artist and introduced Nelly Furtado and Timbaland
- Carmen Electra and David Spade – presented Choice Comedian
- Shaun White and Hilarie Burton – introduced Steve-O and Ryan Simonetti
- Brittany Murphy and Chris "Ludacris" Bridges – presented Choice Female and Male Hottie
- Christina Milian, Wentworth Miller, and Amaury Nolasco – presented Choice TV Actress
- Sophia Bush and Chingy – presented Choice Music: Love Song
- David Boreanaz and Emily Deschanel – introduced Rihanna
- Sean Paul and Paula Abdul – presented Choice Music: Rock Group
- Ashton Kutcher – presented Courage Award
- Jensen Ackles and Jenna Dewan – presented Choice Grill
- Kristin Cavallari, JoJo, and Ne-Yo – presented Choice TV Show: Comedy/Musical
- Brandon Routh – introduced Jennifer Aniston and Vince Vaughn
- Kristen Bell and Tom Welling – presented Choice Movie Actor: Drama/Action Adventure
- Ashley Olsen and Snoop Dogg – presented Choice Action Adventure Movie
- Britney Spears – introduced Kevin Federline

== Winners and nominees ==
Voting took place via the Teen People, MySpace, IGN, and Fox websites, and ended on August 11, 2006. with 14.7 million votes cast. Pirates of the Caribbean: Dead Man's Chest received the most nominations in the Movies categories, and overall, with nine. Everybody Hates Chris led the Television categories with six nominations, followed by Grey's Anatomy, Smallville, and The O.C. with five each. Rihanna was the most-nominated Music act, earning six nominations, while Shakira and Sean Paul tied with four apiece.

Winners are listed first and highlighted in bold.

=== Movies ===
Choice Movie: Action Adventure	Choice Movie: Drama
**Pirates of the Caribbean: Dead Man's Chest**; King Kong; Mission: Impossible III; Superman Returns; V for Vendetta; X-Men: The Last Stand	**Harry Potter and the Goblet of Fire**; Flightplan; Goal!; Pride & Prejudice; Take the Lead; Walk the Line
Choice Movie Actor: Drama/Action Adventure	Choice Movie Actress: Drama/Action Adventure
**Johnny Depp – Pirates of the Caribbean: Dead Man's Chest as Captain Jack Sparrow**; Orlando Bloom – Pirates of the Caribbean: Dead Man's Chest as Will Turner; Chris "Ludacris" Bridges – Crash as Anthony & Hustle & Flow as DJay; Tom Cruise – Mission: Impossible III as Ethan Hunt; Terrence Howard – Crash as Cameron Thayer & Hustle & Flow as Skinny Black; Hugh Jackman – X-Men: The Last Stand as Logan / Wolverine	**Reese Witherspoon – Walk the Line as June Carter**; Jessica Alba – Fantastic Four as Sue Storm / Invisible Woman; Halle Berry – X-Men: The Last Stand as Ororo Munroe / Storm; Keira Knightley – Pride & Prejudice as Elizabeth Bennet and Pirates of the Caribbean: Dead Man's Chest as Elizabeth Swann; Natalie Portman – V for Vendetta as Evey Hammond; Keri Russell – Mission: Impossible III as Lindsey Farris
Choice Movie: Comedy	Choice Movie Actor: Comedy
**She's the Man**; The Benchwarmers; The Break-Up; Click; Nacho Libre; Scary Movie 4	**Johnny Depp – Charlie and the Chocolate Factory as Willy Wonka**; Jack Black – Nacho Libre as Nacho; Jim Carrey – Fun with Dick and Jane as Dick Harper; Jon Heder – Just like Heaven as Darryl & The Benchwarmers as Clark Reedy; Adam Sandler – Click as Michael Newman; Vince Vaughn – The Break-Up as Gary Grobowski
Choice Movie Actress: Comedy	Choice Movie: Thriller
**Rachel McAdams – The Family Stone as Amy Stone**; Jennifer Aniston – The Break-Up as Brooke Meyers; Hilary Duff – Cheaper by the Dozen 2 as Lorraine Baker; Lindsay Lohan – Just My Luck as Ashley Albright; Sarah Jessica Parker – Failure to Launch as Paula; Queen Latifah – Last Holiday as Georgia Byrd	**Red Eye**; An American Haunting; Hostel; The Omen; Saw II; Silent Hill
Choice Movie: Chick Flick	Choice Movie: Sleazebag
**Just like Heaven**; Aquamarine; Failure to Launch; Just My Luck; The Lake House; Last Holiday	**Bill Nighy – Pirates of the Caribbean: Dead Man's Chest as Davy Jones**; Jack Black – King Kong as Carl Denham; Ian McKellen – The Da Vinci Code as Sir Leigh Teabing & X-Men: The Last Stand as Erik Lehnsherr / Magneto; Cillian Murphy – Red Eye as Jackson Rippner; Kevin Spacey – Superman Returns as Lex Luthor; Meryl Streep – The Devil Wears Prada as Miranda Priestly
Choice Movie: Male Breakout Star	Choice Movie: Female Breakout Star
**Channing Tatum – She's the Man as Duke Orsino**; Kuno Becker – Goal! as Santiago Muñez; Lucas Black – The Fast and the Furious: Tokyo Drift as Sean Boswell; Curtis "50 Cent" Jackson – Get Rich or Die Tryin' as Marcus "Young Caesar" Greer; Héctor Jiménez – Nacho Libre as Esqueleto; Brandon Routh – Superman Returns as Clark Kent / Superman	**Jessica Simpson – The Dukes of Hazzard as Daisy Duke**; Emily Blunt – The Devil Wears Prada as Emily Charlton; Yaya DaCosta – Take the Lead as LaRhette Dudley; Isla Fisher – Wedding Crashers as Gloria Cleary; Meagan Good – Waist Deep as Coco; JoJo – Aquamarine as Hailey Rogers
Choice Movie: Chemistry	Choice Movie: Liplock
**Jennifer Aniston & Vince Vaughn – The Break-Up**; Jack Black & Héctor Jiménez – Nacho Libre; Brandon Routh & Kate Bosworth – Superman Returns; Adam Sandler & Kate Beckinsale – Click; David Spade, Jon Heder, & Rob Schneider – The Benchwarmers; Meryl Streep & Anne Hathaway – The Devil Wears Prada	**Keanu Reeves & Sandra Bullock – The Lake House**; Amanda Bynes & Channing Tatum – She's the Man; Anna Faris & Chris Marquette – Just Friends; Hugh Jackman & Famke Janssen – X-Men: The Last Stand; LL Cool J & Queen Latifah – Last Holiday; Owen Wilson & Rachel McAdams – Wedding Crashers
Choice Movie: Hissy Fit	Choice Movie: Rumble
**Keira Knightley – Pirates of the Caribbean: Dead Man's Chest**; Anna Faris – Just Friends; Isla Fisher – Wedding Crashers; King Kong – King Kong; Lindsay Lohan – Just My Luck; Adam Sandler – Click	**Orlando Bloom vs. Jack Davenport – Pirates of the Caribbean: Dead Man's Chest**; Jack Black vs. Silver King – Nacho Libre; Jon Heder vs. Karl's Auto Body – The Benchwarmers; King Kong vs. T-Rex – King Kong; Brandon Routh vs. The Airplane – Superman Returns; The X-Men vs. Magneto's Brotherhood – X-Men: The Last Stand
Choice Movie: Scream Scene	Choice Summer Movie: Drama/Action Adventure
**Keira Knightley – Pirates of the Caribbean: Dead Man's Chest**; Jay Hernandez – Hostel; Rachel Hurd-Wood – An American Haunting; Rachel McAdams – Red Eye; Julia Stiles – The Omen; Donnie Wahlberg – Saw II	**Pirates of the Caribbean: Dead Man's Chest**; The Fast and the Furious: Tokyo Drift; Lady in the Water; Miami Vice; Superman Returns; X-Men: The Last Stand
Choice Summer Movie: Comedy
**Talladega Nights: The Ballad of Ricky Bobby**; Click; The Devil Wears Prada; John Tucker Must Die; Little Man; You, Me and Dupree

=== Television ===
Choice TV Actor	Choice TV Actress
**James Denton – Desperate Housewives as Mike Delfino**; David Boreanaz – Bones as Seeley Booth; George Eads – CSI: Crime Scene Investigation as Nick Stokes; Hugh Laurie – House as Dr. Gregory House; Wentworth Miller – Prison Break as Michael Scofield; Kiefer Sutherland – 24 as Jack Bauer	**Mischa Barton – The O.C. as Marissa Cooper**; Jennifer Garner – Alias as Sydney Bristow; Teri Hatcher – Desperate Housewives as Susan Mayer; Debra Messing – Will & Grace as Grace Adler; Alyssa Milano – Charmed as Phoebe Halliwell; Ellen Pompeo – Grey's Anatomy as Dr. Meredith Grey
Choice TV Show: Drama/Action Adventure	Choice TV Actor: Drama/Action Adventure
**The O.C.**; Grey's Anatomy; House; Lost; One Tree Hill; Smallville	**Adam Brody – The O.C. as Seth Cohen**; Patrick Dempsey – Grey's Anatomy as Dr. Derek Shepherd; Matthew Fox – Lost as Jack Shephard; Chad Michael Murray – One Tree Hill as Lucas Scott; Kiefer Sutherland – 24 as Jack Bauer; Tom Welling – Smallville as Clark Kent
Choice TV Actress: Drama/Action Adventure	Choice TV Show: Comedy/Musical
**Rachel Bilson – The O.C. as Summer Roberts**; Kristen Bell – Veronica Mars as Veronica Mars; Sophia Bush – One Tree Hill as Brooke Davis; Katherine Heigl – Grey's Anatomy as Dr. Izzie Stevens; Kristin Kreuk – Smallville as Lana Lang; Evangeline Lilly – Lost as Kate Austen	**High School Musical**; Desperate Housewives; Everybody Hates Chris; Gilmore Girls; My Name Is Earl; The War at Home
Choice TV Actor: Comedy	Choice TV Actress: Comedy
**Wilmer Valderrama – That '70s Show as Fez**; Zach Braff – Scrubs as Dr. John "J.D." Dorian; Steve Carell – The Office as Michael Scott; Jason Lee – My Name Is Earl as Earl Hickey; Michael Rapaport – The War at Home as Dave Gold; Tyler James Williams – Everybody Hates Chris as Chris	**Alexis Bledel – Gilmore Girls as Rory Gilmore**; Tichina Arnold – Everybody Hates Chris as Rochelle; Mila Kunis – That '70s Show as Jackie Burkhart; Eva Longoria – Desperate Housewives as Gabrielle Solis; Jaime Pressly – My Name Is Earl as Joy Turner; Raven-Symoné – That's So Raven as Raven Baxter
Choice TV Show: Reality	Choice TV: Male Reality Star
**American Idol**; America's Next Top Model; Beauty and the Geek; Laguna Beach: The Real Orange County; Survivor: Guatemala; Yo Momma	**Drew Lachey – Dancing with the Stars**; Ashley Parker Angel – There & Back; Aras Baskauskas – Survivor: Panama; Flavor Flav – Flavor of Love; Hulk Hogan – Hogan Knows Best; Bam Margera – Viva La Bam
Choice TV: Female Reality Star	Choice TV Show: Animated
**Lauren Conrad – The Hills**; Kristin Cavallari – Laguna Beach: The Real Orange County; Dani Evans – America's Next Top Model; Paris Hilton – The Simple Life; Brooke Hogan – Hogan Knows Best; Stacy Keibler – Dancing with the Stars	**Family Guy**; American Dad!; The Boondocks; King of the Hill; The Simpsons; South Park
Choice TV: Breakout Star	Choice TV: Breakout Show
**Zac Efron – High School Musical as Troy Bolton**; Jensen Ackles – Supernatural as Dean Winchester; Miley Cyrus – Hannah Montana as Miley Stewart; Haylie Duff – 7th Heaven as Sandy Jameson; Vanessa Hudgens – High School Musical as Gabriella Montez; Wentworth Miller – Prison Break as Michael Scofield	**So You Think You Can Dance**; Everybody Hates Chris; Ghost Whisperer; Prison Break; Supernatural; Yo Momma
Choice TV: Chemistry
**Zac Efron & Vanessa Hudgens – High School Musical**; Alexis Bledel & Matt Czuchry – Gilmore Girls; Matthew Fox, Josh Holloway, & Evangeline Lilly – Lost; Adrian Grenier, Jeremy Piven, Jerry Ferrara, Kevin Connolly, & Kevin Dillon – Entourage; Ellen Pompeo, Sandra Oh, Katherine Heigl, Justin Chambers, T. R. Knight, Chandra Wilson, James Pickens Jr., Kate Walsh, Isaiah Washington, & Patrick Dempsey – Grey's Anatomy; Tom Welling & Kristin Kreuk – Smallville
Choice TV: Sidekick	Choice TV: Personality
**Allison Mack – Smallville as Chloe Sullivan**; Percy Daggs III – Veronica Mars as Wallace Fennel; Donald Faison – Scrubs as Dr. Chris Turk; Jorge Garcia – Lost as Hugo "Hurley" Reyes; Vincent Martella – Everybody Hates Chris as Greg Wuliger; Amaury Nolasco – Prison Break as Fernando Sucre	**Ashton Kutcher – Punk'd**; Nick Cannon – Wild 'n Out; Simon Cowell – American Idol; Maria Menounos – Access Hollywood & Today; Vanessa Minnillo – Total Request Live & Entertainment Tonight; Ryan Seacrest – American Idol
Choice TV: Parental Unit	Choice Summer TV Show
**Lauren Graham – Gilmore Girls**; Tichina Arnold & Terry Crews – Everybody Hates Chris as Rochelle & Julius; Anita Barone & Michael Rapaport – The War at Home as Dave & Vicky; Enrico Colantoni – Veronica Mars as Keith Mars; Catherine Hicks & Stephen Collins – 7th Heaven as The Camdens; Kelly Rowan & Peter Gallagher – The O.C. as The Cohens	**So You Think You Can Dance**; America's Got Talent; Big Brother; Entourage; Kyle XY; Rock Star: Supernova

=== Music ===
Choice Music: Male Artist	Choice Music: Female Artist
**James Blunt**; Chris Brown; Daddy Yankee; Jack Johnson; T.I.; Kanye West	**Kelly Clarkson**; Mary J. Blige; Mariah Carey; Rihanna; Shakira; Carrie Underwood
Choice Music: R&B Artist	Choice Music: Rap Artist
**Rihanna**; Mary J. Blige; Chris Brown; Mariah Carey; Jamie Foxx; Ne-Yo	**The Black Eyed Peas**; Missy Elliott; Sean Paul; T.I.; Paul Wall; Kanye West
Choice Music: Rock Group	Choice Music: Single
**Fall Out Boy**; The All-American Rejects; Arctic Monkeys; Foo Fighters; Hoobastank; Red Hot Chili Peppers	**"Dance, Dance" – Fall Out Boy**; "Hips Don't Lie" – Shakira featuring Wyclef Jean; "SOS" – Rihanna; "Temperature" – Sean Paul; "Walk Away" – Kelly Clarkson; "You're Beautiful" – James Blunt
Choice Music: R&B/Hip-Hop Track	Choice Music: Rap Track
**"Promiscuous" – Nelly Furtado featuring Timbaland**; "Ain't No Other Man" – Christina Aguilera; "Buttons" – The Pussycat Dolls featuring Snoop Dogg; "Check on It" – Beyoncé featuring Slim Thug; "Hips Don't Lie" – Shakira featuring Wyclef Jean; "Temperature" – Sean Paul	**"Ridin'" – Chamillionaire featuring Krayzie Bone**; "Lean wit It, Rock wit It" – Dem Franchize Boyz; "Shake" – Ying Yang Twins featuring Pitbull; "Snap Ya Fingers" – Lil Jon featuring E-40 and Sean Paul; "What You Know" – T.I.; "Where'd You Go" – Fort Minor featuring Holly Brook
Choice Music: Rock Track	Choice Music: Love Song
**"Dance, Dance" – Fall Out Boy**; "Dani California" – Red Hot Chili Peppers; "I Write Sins Not Tragedies" – Panic! at the Disco; "MakeDamnSure" – Taking Back Sunday; "Move Along" – The All-American Rejects; "Over My Head (Cable Car)" – The Fray	**"What's Left of Me" – Nick Lachey**; "Be Without You" – Mary J. Blige; "For You I Will (Confidence)" – Teddy Geiger; "So Sick" – Ne-Yo; "You and Me" – Lifehouse; "You're Beautiful" – James Blunt
Choice Music: Male Breakout Artist	Choice Music: Female Breakout Artist
**Chris Brown**; James Blunt; Gnarls Barkley; Taylor Hicks; Ne-Yo; Daniel Powter	**Rihanna**; Natasha Bedingfield; LeToya; Katharine McPhee; Anna Nalick; Carrie Underwood
Choice Music: V-Cast Artist	Choice Summer Song
**Nelly Furtado**; The Black-Eyed Peas; Jesse McCartney; Rihanna; Shakira; Yellowcard	**"Promiscuous" – Nelly Furtado featuring Timbaland**; "Ain't No Other Man" – Christina Aguilera; "Crazy" – Gnarls Barkley; "Hips Don't Lie" – Shakira featuring Wyclef Jean; "Ridin'" – Chamillionaire featuring Krayzie Bone; "Unfaithful" – Rihanna

=== Sports ===
Choice Male Athlete	Choice Female Athlete
**David Beckham**; Tom Brady; Matt Leinart; Steve Nash; Dwyane Wade; Vince Young	**Maria Sharapova**; Sue Bird; Lisa Leslie; Holly McPeak; Danica Patrick; Michelle Wie
Choice Action Sports: Male	Choice Action Sports: Female
**Shaun White**; Danny Kass; Dave Mirra; Travis Pastrana; Paul Rodriguez; Ryan Sheckler	**Sofía Mulánovich**; Cara-Beth Burnside; Dallas Friday; Lindsey Jacobellis; Elissa Steamer; Hannah Teter

=== Miscellaneous ===
Choice Male Hottie	Choice Female Hottie
**Orlando Bloom**; Chris Brown; Nick Lachey; Wentworth Miller; Chad Michael Murray; Justin Timberlake	**Jessica Alba**; Rachel Bilson; Scarlett Johansson; Eva Longoria; Rihanna; Jessica Simpson
Choice Comedian	Choice Grill
**Adam Sandler**; Jack Black; Jim Carrey; Dane Cook; Rachel Dratch; Chris Rock	**Brooke Hogan**; Flavor Flav; Mike Jones; Kelis; Nelly; Paul Wall
Choice Red Carpet Fashion Icon: Male	Choice Red Carpet Fashion Icon: Female
**Nick Lachey**; Diddy; Kevin Federline; Terrence Howard; Ryan Seacrest; Kanye West	**Jessica Alba**; Mischa Barton; Halle Berry; Beyoncé; Jessica Simpson; Gwen Stefani
Choice Video Game
**New Super Mario Bros.**; Fight Night Round 3; Kingdom Hearts II; Major League Baseball 2K6; Tom Clancy's Ghost Recon Advanced Warfighter; X-Men: The Official Game
