= Pure (2002 film) =

- Theatrical release poster
- Directed by: Gillies MacKinnon
- Written by: Alison Hume
- Produced by: Howard Burch
- Starring: Molly Parker; Harry Eden; Keira Knightley
- Cinematography: John de Borman
- Edited by: Pia Di Ciaula
- Music by: Nitin Sawhney
- Production companies: A Bad Way Ltd.; Kudos Productions Ltd.; Little Wing Films
- Distributed by: Indican Pictures
- Release date: 13 September 2002 (TIFF)
- Running time: 96 minutes
- Country: United Kingdom
- Language: English
- Box office: $145,942

Pure is a 2002 British drama film directed by Gillies MacKinnon and written by Alison Hume, adapted from her research into maternal heroin addiction. It stars Harry Eden as Paul, a young boy who becomes the de facto caretaker for his mother Mel (Molly Parker) and younger brother, following their father's death. Set in London's East End, Pure is told through Paul's perspective and explores the impact of parental drug addiction on family life and innocence. Keira Knightley and David Wenham appear in supporting roles.

The film received a mixed critical response but was praised for Eden's debut performance, which won him a British Independent Film Award as the most promising newcomer. MacKinnon was also honoured with the Manfred Salzgeber Award at the 2003 Berlin International Film Festival.

== Plot ==
Ten‑year‑old Paul lives with his mother Mel and younger brother Lee in a housing estate in the East End of London, near West Ham United's Boleyn Ground. When their father unexpectedly dies, Paul is forced to take on caretaker duties, including looking after Lee and preparing what he believes to be his mother's "medicine", unaware it is actually heroin.

Mel becomes sexually involved with Lenny, a local drug dealer who was a friend of her late husband. Lenny supplies her heroin addiction while exploiting her vulnerability and deepening her dependence. As Paul begins to understand the reality of Mel's drug use, his world is further shaken by the overdose death of Vicki, a friend of Mel's.

Determined to help, Paul hides Mel's stash and supports her through drug withdrawal, by helping prepare withdrawal doses, taking on responsibilities beyond his years. During this time, he befriends Louise, a pregnant young waitress struggling with her own drug addiction, but who becomes a source of compassion and support. When social services deem Mel unfit, Paul and Lee are temporarily placed in the care of their grandparents.

Despite his youth, Paul desperately tries to keep the family intact as Mel sinks deeper, and Lenny tightens his grip by pressing Mel for repayment, threatening violence. Only when Mel hits rock bottom does she find her will to quit heroin and reclaim her role as a mother.

== Cast ==
- Molly Parker as Mel
- Harry Eden as Paul
- David Wenham as Lenny
- Keira Knightley as Louise
- Vinnie Hunter as Lee
- Marsha Thomason as Vicki
- Geraldine McEwan as Nanna
- Karl Johnson as Grandad
- Gary Lewis as Detective Inspector French
- Kate Ashfield as Helen (Social Worker)

== Production ==
=== Development ===
The screenplay was written by Alison Hume, following her experience while researching a charity who were creating a booklet to support children of drug-addicted parents. Moved by the subject, Hume, who had trained as a journalist, spent over six months conducting in-depth research, including speaking directly with mothers recovering from heroin addiction. Part of her research involved speaking to families living on the Buttershaw estate in Bradford, discussing the pressures of living with drugs, such as heroin, which were easily available. This experience changed her perspective on drug users and inspired her to write a story focused on the emotional bond between a mother and child, aiming to challenge public perceptions of addiction. Hume chose to set the story in West Ham, East London due to her childhood memories of West Ham football matches and the community feeling she remembered.

In late 2000, Hume's agent connected her with Howard Burch at Kudos Productions. At the time, Hume had only a rough concept for Pure, but she and Burch collaborated to develop the story from the point of view of a ten-year-old boy. The project quickly found momentum and after further development, Little Wing Films came on board to finance the film in August 2002, despite the subject matter and the lack of major stars attached. Hume praised Burch's consistent belief in the story and indicated he was instrumental in moving the project forward.

Gillies MacKinnon, known for directing films such as Hideous Kinky and Small Faces, was an early favourite as director due to his visual style and experience working with children. He was drawn to the emotional element of the story and its perspective from a child. However, he initially hesitated in agreeing to direct as he had already directed the BBC drama Needle on heroin addiction in 1990. After reading Hume's script, he realised that Pure was less about drugs and more about a boy's battle to save his mother. He continued to revise the script even during production.

=== Casting ===
Once Gillies MacKinnon had joined the project, casting began immediately, with the priority being the search for a young actor to portray Paul, who appears in every scene of the film. Given the emotional depth required for the role, casting director Chloe Emmerson was brought in due to her work on Billy Elliot. Harry Eden, then an unknown actor, was one of the first to audition. Eden was inspired to act after seeing a production of Oliver Twist. Although MacKinnon was instantly drawn to him, Eden had to attend numerous callbacks to ensure that as a child actor, he had the "stamina to stay the course of a long and demanding shoot". Eden secured the part out of over 2,500 other child actors and described the film as "proper acting". Eden, a real-life supporter of West Ham United, has dyslexia and script pages had to be enlarged so that he was able to read them.

Casting the adult roles proved more straightforward. MacKinnon already had David Wenham in mind for Lenny. Wenham was drawn to the character's complexity and appreciated the story's perspective through the eyes of a child. Canadian actress Molly Parker was suggested early on for the role of Mel, as MacKinnon had been impressed by her performances in Kissed and Wonderland. Although Parker initially struggled to understand how a loving mother could neglect her children, she eventually connected with the character through research and speaking with other people. MacKinnon praised her portrayal of Mel, noting "I think she has something very special and she has transformed the character".

Keira Knightley was cast as Louise, with MacKinnon remarking that he had an instinctive confidence in her.

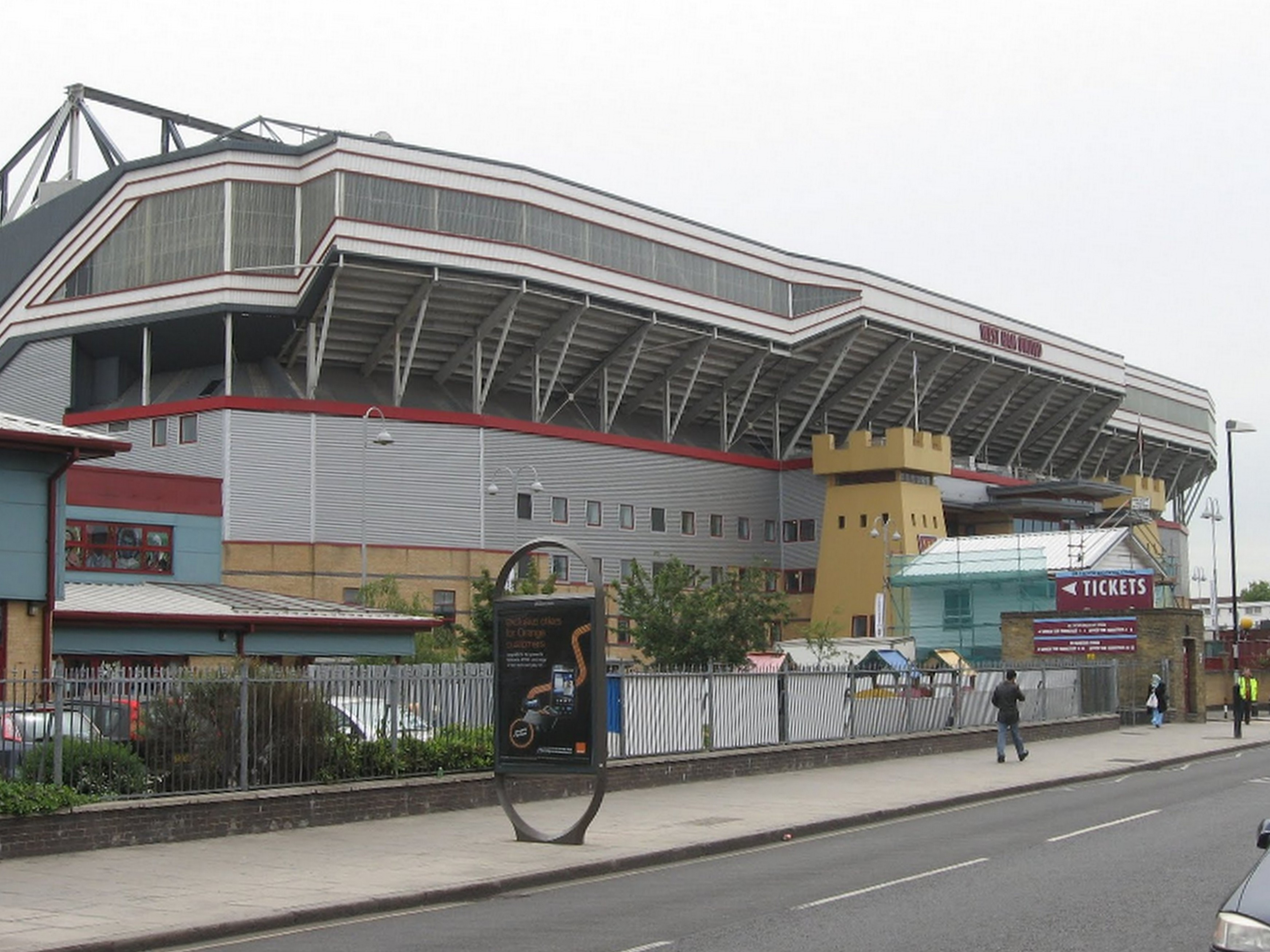
West Ham's former Boleyn Ground features in the film

=== Filming ===
Filming took place from 13 January to 3 March 2003, with principal photography conducted on location in East London and at Three Mills Studios. Production designer Jon Henson and cinematographer John de Borman visited locations with MacKinnon and worked to define the film's visual language, having previously collaborated on Hideous Kinky. Colours were used symbolically, for instance gold for Louise (angelic presence), red for Vicki (danger, who dies of overdose) and blue/green tones for Paul's home, representing his view of the world. Lighting and camera work further enhanced the emotional landscape, with handheld shots and wide-angle lenses used to create emotional tension.

As West Ham United's stadium features in the film, the producers were required to obtain permission from the club to include it. While the club initially expressed concern about their merchandise appearing in certain scenes, MacKinnon noted that they were ultimately reasonable and cooperative.

=== Post production ===
Writer Alison Hume held a question-and-answer session in June 2003, prior to the film being screened at Bradford's National Museum of Photography, Film and Television.

== Reception ==
=== Box office ===
Pure had a modest box office performance. In its opening weekend in the United Kingdom, the film earned $9,830. It was later released in North America during the summer of 2005, where it grossed $5,154 in its opening weekend. Overall, the film took in $102,471 in the UK and $43,471 internationally, resulting in a total worldwide gross of $145,942.

=== Critical response ===
Alan Morrison, writing for Empire magazine, praised all performances as "superb", with particular mention of Eden's portrayal as "one of the best performances by a child actor in the history of British cinema". David Stratton of Variety commended Eden's "outstanding juvenile performance" and described the film as one of MacKinnon's "most achieved productions to date". The film was given a four out of four star rating by Roger Ebert in 2005, describing Eden's performance as "strong, sure, touching", while remarking Molly Parker as being "an extraordinary actress".

In contrast, a critic for the London Evening Standard, writing in May 2003, found implausible elements in the film and viewed the ending as being "over-simplified", describing it a "facile exit". However, they praised the performance of Harry Eden, remarking that he "carries the story". Catherine Shoard of the Sunday Telegraph felt the film had a poor script and described the plot as disjointed, but praised Eden as "the best child actor in recent memory". The film was given a one-star rating by Uncut, who felt that too many characters were competing for screen time, while regarding it as a powerful story that was poorly written.

Internationally, the film received a mixed but thoughtful critical response. Michael Wilmington of the Chicago Tribune rated it three stars, calling it a "beautifully acted coming-of-age film", praising its "superb cast" and giving special mention to Eden's performance. The Arizona Daily Star gave it a 2.5-star rating, with reporter Phil Villarreal commending MacKinnon's direction, though he felt the closing scenes came across as contrived in their attempt to deliver a uplifting resolution. In the Tucson Citizen, reporter Chuck Graham singled out Keira Knightley, writing that she "owns every scene". He also suggested the film likely only received a North American release due to Knightley's rising profile at the time. Graham described Pure as "well-intentioned", though he felt it lacked the dramatic edge needed to resonate with audiences and gave it a C+ rating.

=== Awards ===
Berlin International Film Festival

Won: Manfred Salzgeber Award (Gillies MacKinnon)
Won: Manfred Salzgeber Award – Special Mention (Harry Eden)

Emden International Film Festival

Won: Emden Film Award

British Independent Film Awards 2003

Won: Most Promising Newcomer (Harry Eden)
