= Peter Pan (2003 film) =

2003 film directed by P. J. Hogan

- International theatrical release poster
- Directed by: P. J. Hogan
- Screenplay by: P. J. Hogan; Michael Goldenberg
- Based on: Peter and Wendy by J. M. Barrie
- Produced by: Lucy Fisher; Douglas Wick; Patrick McCormick
- Starring: Jason Isaacs; Jeremy Sumpter; Richard Briers; Rachel Hurd-Wood; Olivia Williams; Lynn Redgrave; Ludivine Sagnier
- Cinematography: Donald McAlpine
- Edited by: Garth Craven; Michael Kahn
- Music by: James Newton Howard
- Production companies: Universal Pictures; Columbia Pictures; Revolution Studios; Red Wagon Entertainment; Allied Stars Ltd.
- Distributed by: Universal Pictures (English-speaking territories and France); Columbia Pictures (through Columbia TriStar Film Distributors International; International)
- Release dates: 18 December 2003 (Australia); 24 December 2003 (United Kingdom); 25 December 2003 (United States)
- Running time: 113 minutes
- Countries: United Kingdom; United States; Australia
- Language: English
- Budget: $130 million
- Box office: $122 million

Peter Pan is a 2003 fantasy adventure film directed by P. J. Hogan and written by Hogan and Michael Goldenberg. The screenplay is based on the 1904 play and 1911 novel Peter Pan, or The Boy Who Wouldn't Grow Up by J. M. Barrie. Jason Isaacs plays the dual roles of Captain Hook and George Darling, Olivia Williams plays Mary Darling, while Jeremy Sumpter plays Peter Pan, Rachel Hurd-Wood plays Wendy Darling, and Ludivine Sagnier plays Tinker Bell. Lynn Redgrave plays a supporting role as Aunt Millicent, a new character created for the film.

After completing the script, Hogan and Goldenberg were given approval by Great Ormond Street Hospital, which held the rights to Barrie's story. Principal photography took place in Australia at Village Roadshow Studios on the Gold Coast, Queensland from September 2002 to May 2003.

Peter Pan premiered at the Empire in Leicester Square, London on 9 December 2003, and was theatrically released by Universal Pictures, Columbia Pictures, and Revolution Studios in the United Kingdom on 24 December 2003 and in the United States on 25 December 2003. The film received generally positive reviews from critics, with praise for the performances (particularly those of Sumpter, Hurd-Wood, and Isaacs), visuals, romantic feel, and James Newton Howard's musical score. However, it was a financial failure, grossing $122 million worldwide against an estimated budget of $130 million.

== Plot ==
In Edwardian London, Wendy Darling tells her two younger brothers John and Michael stories of Captain Hook and his pirates. Peter Pan overhears her from outside their nursery window. Dissatisfied with Wendy's stories, Aunt Millicent advises the Darlings to focus on her future prospects. One night, Wendy sees Peter return to the nursery to watch her sleep, but his shadow is bitten off by the family's nurse dog, Nana. At school, Wendy's teacher discovers her hand-drawn picture of Peter. Attempting to intercept a disciplinary letter meant for her father, Wendy inadvertently embarrasses him when Nana's pursuit causes an accident at the local bank.

In search of his shadow, Peter befriends Wendy, who sews it back onto him. He invites Wendy and her brothers to Neverland so she can tell her stories to his gang of Lost Boys. Using Tinker Bell's fairy dust, the four fly to Neverland, while Nana alerts Mr. and Mrs. Darling of what has happened. In Neverland, Captain Hook and his pirate crew soon attack the children. Jealous of Peter's affection for Wendy, Tinker Bell tricks the Lost Boys into shooting the girl out of the sky, who mistakes her for a bird. Fortunately, Wendy survives, saved by an acorn Peter had given her earlier. Peter banishes Tinker Bell and ends their friendship.

Wendy agrees to the Lost Boys' request to be their "mother", while Peter takes the role of their father. Meanwhile, John and Michael encounter Tiger Lily, a Native American princess, and Hook and his crew take the three to the Black Castle. Peter, Wendy, and the Lost Boys rescue them, as Hook is chased by the crocodile who has followed him for years. After a celebration at the Native American camp, Peter shows Wendy the fairies' home and the two share a romantic dance. Hook spies on the pair and convinces Tinker Bell that Peter will eventually choose to leave Neverland for Wendy. When Wendy asks Peter to express his feelings, he angrily demands she return home, refusing to believe that he can ever feel love without having to grow up. Peter then flies off, returns to the Darling nursery and unsuccessfully tries shutting the open window, determined to keep Wendy, John and Michael in Neverland.

Wendy urges her brothers to return home with her, as they are starting to forget their parents. The Lost Boys eventually decide to join them, dismaying Peter. Wendy says goodbye to Peter, leaving him a cup of medicine to drink. When Wendy leaves the hideout, she and the rest of the boys are captured by Hook's crew, who also poison Peter's medicine. However, Tinker Bell drinks it and succumbs. A distraught Peter repeatedly proclaims his belief in fairies and telepathically reaches out to everyone at Neverland and London to do the same. This revives Tinker Bell, who helps Peter rescue Wendy and free the Lost Boys. During the ensuing fight with the pirates, Hook forcefully uses Tinker Bell's dust to grant him flying abilities. During their duel, Hook taunts Peter about Wendy wanting to abandon him, and how she will eventually grow up and marry another man. Weakened, Peter falls and is incapacitated. Hook allows Wendy to say goodbye to Peter before killing him. Finally professing her love for Peter, Wendy kisses him, bringing back his happiness.

Peter defeats Hook, who is swallowed up by the crocodile. Covering the Jolly Roger in fairy dust, Peter flies Wendy and the boys back to London where they are reunited with their parents, who adopt the rest of the Lost Boys. Slightly, who got lost on the way to London and arrives at the house late, is adopted by Aunt Millicent while Mr. Darling reconciles with his children. Peter promises Wendy he will never forget her and one day he will return to visit her, before returning to Neverland with Tinker Bell. Despite never seeing Peter again, she continues telling his story to her children, and in turn to her grandchildren and descendants.

== Cast ==
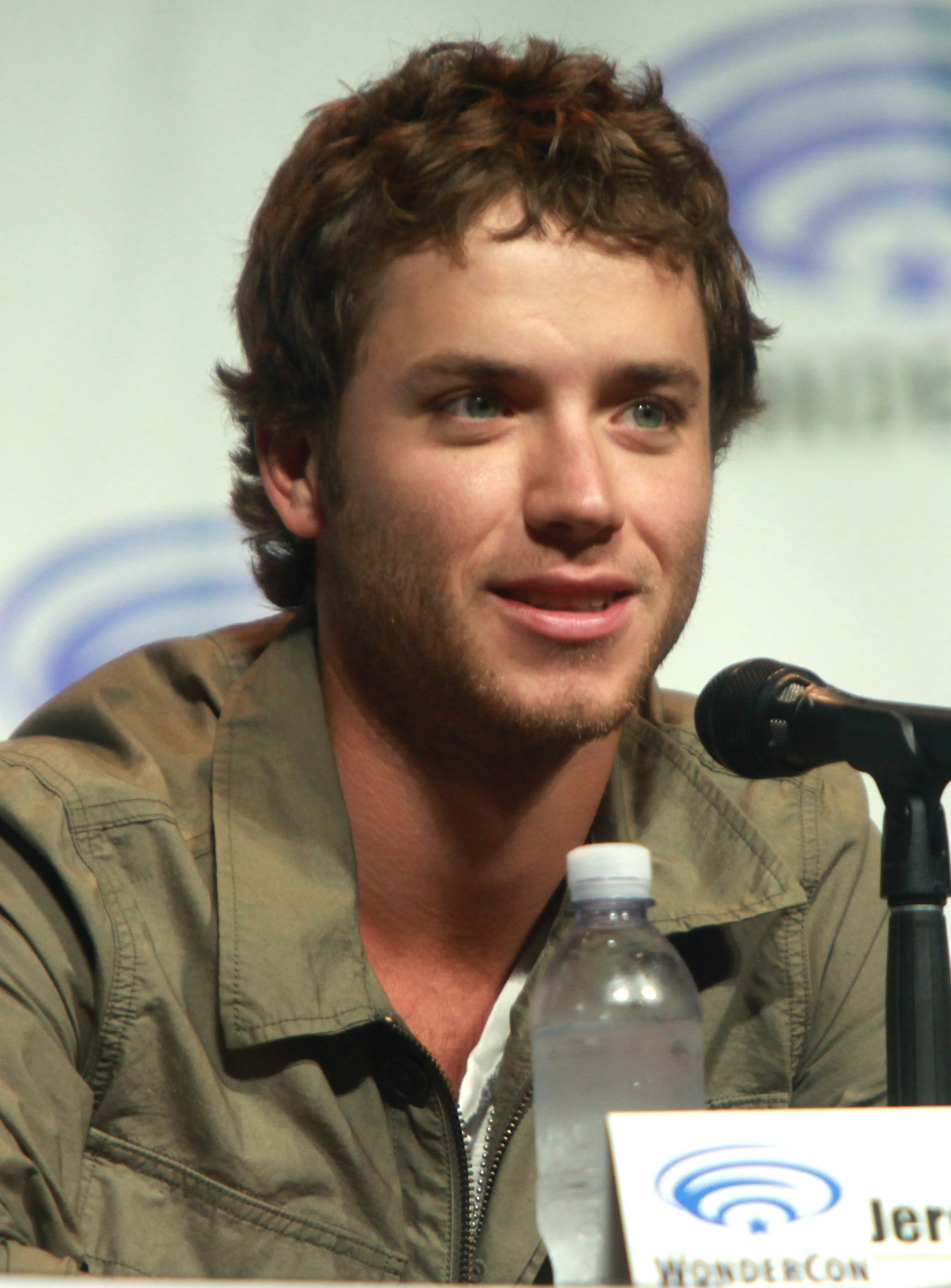
Jeremy Sumpter
(Peter Pan)

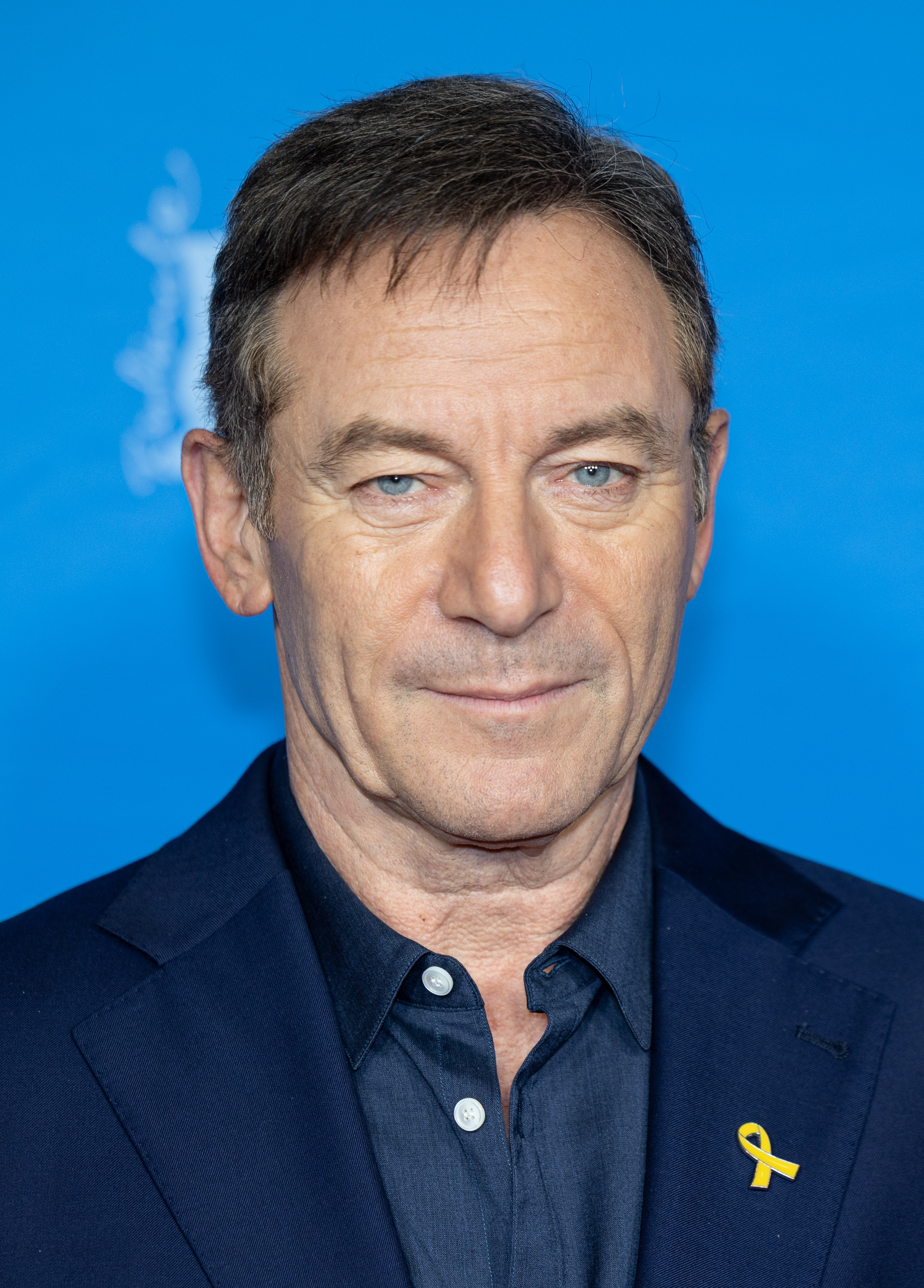
Jason Isaacs
(Captain Hook)

- Jeremy Sumpter as Peter Pan: a young boy who can fly and refuses to grow up. He has a crush on Wendy.
- Jason Isaacs as Captain Hook: the captain of the Jolly Roger and Peter's archenemy, and Mr. Darling: the Darling children's father, Mrs. Darling's husband and the Lost Boys' grandfather.
- Rachel Hurd-Wood as Wendy Darling: the eldest child and only daughter of the Darling family and Peter's love interest.
  - Saffron Burrows plays the adult Wendy, who narrates the film and appears in an unused epilogue.
- Ludivine Sagnier as Tinker Bell: Peter's emotional fairy companion.
- Olivia Williams as Mrs. Darling: the Darling children's mother, Mr. Darling's wife and the Lost Boys' grandmother.
- Lynn Redgrave as Aunt Millicent: the aunt of the three Darling children, the Lost Boys' mother and a character created for the film.
- Richard Briers as Mr. Smee: Hook's dimwitted first-mate.
- Harry Newell as John Darling: the middle child and eldest son of the Darling family and Tiger Lily's love interest.
- Freddie Popplewell as Michael Darling: the youngest child of the Darling family.
- Rebel as Nana: the dog nurse of the Darling family.
- Carsen Gray as Tiger Lily: the daughter of a Native American chief and John Darling's love interest.
- Geoffrey Palmer as Sir Edward Quiller Couch: Mr. Darling's boss at the local bank.
- Kerry Walker as Miss Fulsom: a strict schoolteacher.
- Mathew Waters as the messenger boy
- Tory Mussett as Mermaid

=== The Lost Boys ===
- Theodore Chester as Slightly: Mr. & Mrs. Darling's grandchildren.
- Rupert Simonian as Tootles: Mr. & Mrs. Darling's grandchildren.
- George MacKay as Curly: Mr. & Mrs. Darling's grandchildren.
- Harry Eden as Nibs: Mr. & Mrs. Darling's grandchildren.
- Patrick Gooch and Lachlan Gooch as the Twins: Mr. & Mrs. Darling's grandchildren.

=== The Pirate Crew ===
- Alan Cinis as Skylights
- Frank Whitten as Starkey
- Bruce Spence as Cookson
- Daniel Wyllie as Alf Mason
- Brian Carbee as Albino
- Don Battee as Giant Pirate
- Frank Gallacher as Alsatian Fogarty
- Septimus Caton as Noodler
- Jacob Tomuri as Bill Jukes
- Venant Wong as Quang Lee
- Phil Meacham as Bollard
- Darren Mitchell as Mullins
- Michael Roughan as Cecco

== Production ==
=== Development ===
The film is dedicated to Dodi Al-Fayed, who was executive producer of the 1991 film Hook. Al-Fayed planned to produce a live action version of Peter Pan, and shared his ideas with Diana, Princess of Wales (who was President of Great Ormond St Hospital), who said she "could not wait to see the production once it was underway." Al-Fayed's father, Mohammed Al-Fayed, co-produced the 2003 adaptation of the tale after his son died in the car crash which also killed Diana. Finding Neverland, a film about J. M. Barrie and the creation of Peter Pan, was originally scheduled to be released in 2003, but the producers of this film – who held the screen rights to the story – refused permission for that film to use scenes from the play unless its release was delayed until the following year.

Walt Disney Pictures originally intended to co-finance the film with Columbia Pictures and Revolution Studios, with Buena Vista Pictures Distribution handling distribution in North America, the United Kingdom and Australia, but negotiations broke down following Disney's refusal to change certain aspects of the project. On 24 June 2002, it was announced that Universal Pictures had taken over Disney's role as the third co-financier and would release the film in most English-speaking territories and France.

=== Casting ===
Contrary to the traditional stage casting, the film featured a young boy in the title role. In July 2002, at age 13, Jeremy Sumpter was selected for the role of Peter Pan. Since the first stage production of the story, the title role has usually been played by a woman, a tradition followed in the first film adaptation. Two subsequent animated adaptations have featured a male voice actor as Peter Pan, and a Soviet live-action film adaptation for television cast a boy to play the role. This film was the first live-action theatrical release with a boy playing the part. The casting of a single actor to play both George Darling and Captain Hook follows a tradition also begun in the first staging of the play. Jason Isaacs was selected for the part.

Brie Larson and Emma Roberts auditioned for Wendy Darling.

=== Filming ===
Sumpter did nearly all of his stunts for the film himself. To prepare, he says he practiced sword fighting as much as five hours a day, as well as training in gymnastics and lifting weights. Isaacs trained for sword fighting as well. Principal photography began on 17 September 2002 and concluded on 5 May 2003, taking place entirely inside sound stages at Village Roadshow Studios on Australia's Gold Coast, Queensland. According to Fisher, the decision to shoot in Australia was based on the low value of the Australian dollar at that time. Hogan had originally planned on filming in a variety of locations such as Tahiti, New Zealand, and London but abandoned this idea after scouting some of the locations. Filming on sound stages did help "retain some of the theatricality of the original play", something which Hogan thought was important.

=== Visual effects ===
The visual effects in the film are a mixture of practical and digital. The fairies that appear in the film are actors composited into the film with some digital enhancements. According to actor Jason Isaacs, the filmmakers were impressed with actress Ludivine Sagnier's performance and decided to abandon their plans to make Tinker Bell entirely computer-animated. The film also features a large, computer-generated crocodile. Another character, an animatronic parrot, appears in some scenes on the pirate ship. A similar parrot later appeared in Peter Pan & Wendy, but in more scenes than this one. A complex harness was built to send the live-action actors rotating and gliding through the air for the flight sequences. They were then composited into the shots of London and Neverland, although they are sometimes replaced with computer-generated figures. One other aspect of bringing the story to life was the complex sword-fighting sequences, for which the actors were trained. Sumpter said that "I had to train for five months before the shoot. I had to do harness training to learn how to fly and learn how to sword fight," and that, "I got stabbed a couple of times with a sword." Isaacs also mentioned he had to learn to sword fight with his left hand, since he himself is right handed; the original source material states the hook replaces the pirate's right hand. They decided to maintain the accuracy instead of changing the hand the hook is on, as it has been done in other adaptations. Hogan says that the flying scenes were very difficult to accomplish, but that, "it was tougher on the kids than it was for me. They were up there on the harness 12' off the ground, having to make it look like flying is easy and fun." Sumpter grew several inches over the course of the film's production, requiring staging tricks to retain Hook's height advantage over Peter in face-to-face scenes late in the process. Hollywood-based producer Lucy Fisher also said that, "The window he flies out of had to be enlarged twice."

== Release ==
This film was released in theatres on 18 December 2003 in Australia, on 24 December 2003 in the United Kingdom and on 25 December 2003 in the United States. For the promotion of the film, the original novel of Peter Pan by J.M. Barrie was re-released displaying the film's promotional material.

Distribution rights were shared between the three companies. Universal Pictures handled North American distribution and distributed through United International Pictures in the United Kingdom, Australia, South Africa, France, and all other English-speaking territories. Columbia TriStar Film Distributors International handled most overseas rights, while Revolution Studios handled international sales for Scandinavia, Portugal, and Israel, as well as worldwide television rights.

A video game based on the film titled Peter Pan: The Motion Picture Event was released for Game Boy Advance on 4 November 2003, developed by Saffire and published by Atari, receiving mixed reviews from critics.

== Reception ==
=== Critical response ===
Peter Pan received generally positive reviews. Review aggregator Rotten Tomatoes gives the film a score of 77% based on 145 reviews and an average rating of 6.8/10. The website's critical consensus reads, "Solid if far from definitive, this version of Peter Pan is visually impressive, psychologically complex and faithful to its original source." On Metacritic, the film has a weighted average score of 64 out of 100, based on 33 critics, indicating "generally favorable reviews". Audiences polled by CinemaScore gave the film an average grade of "A-" on an A+ to F scale.

Film critic Roger Ebert gave the film three and a half out of four stars. MovieGuide has also favourably reviewed the film, calling it "a wonderfully crafted, morally uplifting movie that intentionally emphasizes the fantasy elements of the story both in dialogue and design of the film."

=== Box office ===
Peter Pan earned $48,462,608 at the box office in the United States and another $73.5 million outside the United States, which brought the worldwide total to nearly $122 million. The film's failure was partly due to its competition with the highly anticipated epic fantasy The Lord of the Rings: The Return of the King released the week before, and the family comedy Cheaper by the Dozen, which opened on the same day.

== Accolades ==
Award	Category	Nominee	Result
Saturn Awards	Best Fantasy Film		Nominated
Saturn Awards	Best Performance by a Younger Actor	Jeremy Sumpter	Won
Saturn Awards	Best Performance by a Younger Actor	Rachel Hurd-Wood	Nominated
Saturn Awards	Best Costume Design	Janet Patterson	Nominated
Critics' Choice Movie Awards	Best Family Film		Nominated
Las Vegas Film Critics Society Awards	Best Youth in Film	Rachel Hurd-Wood	Nominated
Phoenix Film Critics Society Awards	Best Live Action Family Film		Nominated
Phoenix Film Critics Society Awards	Best Performance by a Youth in a Lead or Supporting Role – Male	Jeremy Sumpter	Nominated
Visual Effects Society	Outstanding Matte Painting in a Motion Picture	Yusei Uesugi; Giles Hancock	Nominated
Visual Effects Society	Outstanding Performance by a Male or Female Actor in an Effects Film	Ludivine Sagnier	Nominated
Young Artist Award	Best Family Feature Film – Drama		Won
Young Artist Award	Best Performance in a Feature Film – Leading Young Actor	Jeremy Sumpter	Won
Young Artist Award	Best Performance in a Feature Film – Leading Young Actress	Rachel Hurd-Wood	Nominated
Young Artist Award	Best Performance in a Feature Film – Supporting Young Actor	Harry Newell	Nominated
Young Artist Award	Best Performance in a Feature Film – Supporting Young Actress	Carsen Gray	Nominated
