= Moth Boys =

Studio album by Spector
- Released: 21 August 2015
- Genre: Indie rock
- Label: Fiction

Spector chronology
Enjoy It While It Lasts (2012)	Moth Boys (2015)	Now or Whenever (2022)

Singles from Moth Boys
- 1. "All the Sad Young Men" Released: February 3, 2015

Professional ratings
Aggregate scores
Source	Rating
Metacritic	67/100
Review scores
Source	Rating
DIY	4/5 stars
Drowned in Sound	8/10
The Line of Best Fit	8/10
musicOMH	3.5/5 stars
NME	3.5/5 stars

Moth Boys is the second studio album by English indie rock band Spector, released on 21 August 2015. The album reached number 27 in the UK Albums Chart on the week of its release.

== Production ==
The album was recorded in New York and London in 2013 and 2014. It was produced by Duncan Mills, Dev Hynes and Adam Jaffrey.

== Track listing ==
All tracks are written by Frederick Macpherson, except where noted.

No.	Title	Writer(s)	Length
1.	"All the Sad Young Men"	Macpherson/ Cullen	4:40
2.	"Stay High"	Macpherson/ Cullen	3:17
3.	"Believe"		3:57
4.	"Don't Make Me Try"		2:45
5.	"Cocktail Party / Heads Interlude"	Hynes/ Macpherson/ Blandy	4:41
6.	"Bad Boyfriend"		3:04
7.	"Decade of Decay"	Hynes/ Macpherson	2:15
8.	"Kyoto Garden"		3:41
9.	"West End"		3:06
10.	"Using"	Cullen	3:32
11.	"Lately It's You"		5:13

== Chart performance ==
Chart	Peak position
UK Albums Chart	27

== Personnel ==
- Fred Macpherson – vocals
- Tom Shickle – bass guitar
- Jed Cullen – guitar
- Danny Blandy – keyboard, synthesizer
- Yoann Intonti – drums
