= Fatherhood/Motherhood =

Single by Ox.Eagle.Lion.Man
- Released: December 3, 2007
- Genre: Progressive rock, post-punk
- Length: 8:24
- Label: Transgressive Records
- Producer(s): Gordon Raphael

Ox.Eagle.Lion.Man singles chronology
"Fatherhood/Motherhood" (2007)	"The Drowned And The Saved" (2008)

"Fatherhood/Motherhood" is the debut single of progressive rock band Ox.Eagle.Lion.Man. It was released under Transgressive Records in December 2007, on digital download, Limited Edition 7" and also on VHS, which was released with the music video on.

The band introduced themselves to the world officially, via their debut release on Transgressive records. A one-off 'concept single' produced by Gordon Raphael (Is This It, Room On Fire). They wanted their debut release to have as much scope as possible; and to comprise two tracks of equal importance, tied together by more than just the vinyl onto which they are pressed. Without an A or a B side, "Fatherhood/Motherhood" was the first complete piece of work that the band were happy to bequeath to the world, and was also accompanied by a two-party diptych videos, accompanying the release on VHS tape.

== Track listing ==
1. "Fatherhood" - 5:01
2. "Motherhood" - 3:24

== Personnel ==
- Arranged By - Ox.Eagle.Lion.Man
- Bass - Thomas Günnzs
- Drums, Artwork (Layout, Direction) - Edward Quarmby
- Lyrics, Vocals - Frederick Blood-Royale
- Photography - Sonia Melot
- Producer, Mixed by - Gordon Raphael
- (Music) Written by, Guitar - 'Jareth'

Video

Directed by George Fafalios

Starring

- Rachel Hurd-Wood
- L.S.C. Oakeshott
