= Never Fade Away (song) =

Single by Spector

from the album The Luv Luv Luv and Enjoy It While It Lasts
- Released: 8 May 2011
- Genre: Indie rock
- Length: 3:36
- Label: Luv Luv Luv
- Songwriter(s): Frederick Macpherson

Spector singles chronology
"Never Fade Away" (2011)	"What You Wanted" (2011)

"Never Fade Away" is the first single released by English band Spector. It was released on 8 May 2011, on 7" vinyl and digital download. The song is the opening track on their The Luv Luv Luv Singles EP (containing all of Spector's singles, except for "Chevy Thunder" because the single was unreleased at the time). The 7" has an etched (blank) B-side. The song was written by the band's frontman Frederick Macpherson.

The song has been reviewed by Boost the Music and NME, with the track coming #15 in NME's top 50 best tracks of 2011 and being described by the magazine as "A healthy, grandiose indie single, with hooks as sharp and nagging as a No 2 drill to a nerve ending, and as lush as an afternoon on laughing gas."

A remix EP was released 24 August 2012.

== Track listing ==
All tracks are written by Fred Macpherson

Side A
No.	Title	Length
1.	"Never Fade Away"	3:35

Side B
No.	Title	Length
1.	"(Etched)"	N/A

Never Fade Away (Remixes)
No.	Title	Length
1.	"Never Fade Away"	3:36
2.	"Never Fade Away (Benny Benassi Remix)"	7:02
3.	"Never Fade Away (Benny Benassi Remix Radio Edit)"	3:40
4.	"Never Fade Away (Wolfgang Voigt Remix)"	5:23
5.	"Never Fade Away (Damu Remix)"	4:53
