= Harry Eden =

British actor (born 1990)

- Born: 1 March 1990 (age 36); Old Harlow, Essex, England
- Occupation: Actor
- Years active: 2000–present

Harry Eden (born 1 March 1990) is an English actor who won a British Independent Film Award in 2003 for Most Promising Newcomer for his role in Pure.

Eden was born in Loughton, Essex. He attended the Sylvia Young Theatre School. He played Nibs in the 2003 film Peter Pan, and the Artful Dodger in Roman Polanski's Oliver Twist. He was inspired by Lionel Bart's Oliver! and the role of the Artful Dodger.

During a 2003 interview, he said that he preferred acting in a challenging role, saying "I prefer the heavy stuff", remarking that he would not like to be Harry Potter.

Eden is also a keen golfer with a handicap of just 1. In a BBC Radio 5 interview he expressed an interest in playing golf professionally. He partnered with Oliver Fisher at the 2008 Dunhill Links Championship, the European Tour's annual celebrity pro-am.

== Filmography ==
Year	Film	Role	Notes
2000	Hero of the Hour	Brian	TV film
2000	Lock, Stock...	Forest	TV series (1 episode: "...And Four Stolen Hooves")
2001	Casualty	Matty Tate	TV series (1 episode: "Something from the Heart")
2001	The Gentleman Thief	Davie Barnett	TV film
2002	Murder in Mind	David Jackson	TV series (1 episode: "Flashback")
2002	Helen West	Tom Parry	TV series (1 episode: "Deep Sleep")
2002	Pure	Paul	British Independent Film Award for Most Promising Newcomer
2003	Real Men	Russell Wade	TV film Nominated—RTS Television Award for Best Network Newcomer-On Screen
2003	Peter Pan	Nibs	
2004	The Lazarus Child	Ben Heywood	
2005	Oliver Twist	Artful Dodger	
2005	Bleak House	Jo	TV mini-series (7 episodes)
2006	Land of the Blind	12-Year Old Guard	
2006	Cubs	Ben	short
2007	Foyle's War	Terry Morgan	TV series (1 episode: "Casualties of War")
2007	Cape Wrath	Young Donnelly	TV series (3 episodes)
2008	Flashbacks of a Fool	Teenage Joe Scott	
2010	Nightswimming	Luke	short
2016	The Wait For Midnight Thirteen	Tommy Wells	
