= An American Haunting =

- U.S. theatrical release poster
- Directed by: Courtney Solomon
- Screenplay by: Courtney Solomon
- Based on: The Bell Witch: An American Haunting by Brent Monahan
- Produced by: Courtney Solomon; Christopher Milburn; André Rouleau
- Starring: Donald Sutherland; Sissy Spacek; James D'Arcy; Rachel Hurd-Wood
- Cinematography: Adrian Biddle
- Edited by: Richard Comeau
- Music by: Caine Davidson
- Production companies: After Dark Films; Remstar Productions; MediaPro Studios
- Distributed by: Redbus Film Distribution (United Kingdom); Odeon Films (Canada); Freestyle Releasing (United States)
- Release dates: November 5, 2005 (AFI Film Festival); April 14, 2006 (United Kingdom); May 5, 2006 (United States)
- Running time: 90 minutes (United Kingdom); 83 minutes (United States)
- Countries: United Kingdom; Canada; Romania; United States
- Language: English
- Budget: $14 million
- Box office: $29.6 million

An American Haunting is a 2005 historical supernatural horror film written and directed by Courtney Solomon and starring Donald Sutherland, Sissy Spacek, James D'Arcy, and Rachel Hurd-Wood. It is based on the novel The Bell Witch: An American Haunting (1995) by Brent Monahan. The events in the novel are loosely based on the legend of the Bell Witch, who allegedly haunted the Bell family in rural 1810s Tennessee. The film documents the Bell family's supernatural experiences, which are paralleled with a contemporary 21st-century subplot involving a young girl plagued by similar events experienced by Betsy Bell.

An international co-production between the United Kingdom, Canada, Romania, and the United States, An American Haunting was filmed on location in Romania in the fall of 2004.

An American Haunting was first previewed at the AFI Film Festival on November 5, 2005; it screened the same day at the San Sebastián International Film Festival's "Fantasy and Horror Film Week." The film was released in the United Kingdom on April 14, 2006. Freestyle Releasing distributed the film theatrically in the United States on May 5, 2006 in an alternate cut from the version previously released. It received largely unfavorable reviews from film critics, though some did praise it for its performances and period details. The film grossed $29.6 million worldwide against a $14 million budget.

== Plot ==
Teenager Jane runs through the forest and into her house to escape from an unseen threat. When she sees the Bell Witch, a ghost that takes the form of a girl, she awakens with a scream. Her mother dismisses it as a dream and reminds her that this is her week to visit her father. Jane's mother goes to her desk and picks up a binder full of old letters, with a note from someone who claims to be an ancestor. The letters appear written in 19th-century script, detailing a family history:

In 1817 Tennessee, John Bell is taken to church court and found guilty of the theft of a woman's land. The church releases him with the verdict that his loss of honor is sufficient punishment. The offended party, Kate Batts, is infamous in the village due to claims of witchcraft.

Strange events begin to occur and John believes that Batts cursed him. Betsy starts to look very sick and the haunting worsens. Her young teacher, Richard Powell, notices the change in Betsy's behavior. The Bell family tells him they fear that the cause is paranormal. Powell attempts to prove that this is impossible because spirits don't exist. It is implied that Richard is in love with Betsy.

Richard stays in the Bell home to observe Betsy's behavior. His theory is proven wrong when he witnesses Betsy dangling in the air, as if someone is holding her up by her hair. Betsy is sexually assaulted by the spirit. John loses his sanity and sees many forms of the Bell Witch. John asks Kate Batts to kill him and remove her curse. She refuses and tells him that he cursed himself. John tries to kill himself, but the spirit stops him.

Betsy is struck with a revelation that the attacks on her and her father are caused by a supernatural being who was born out of her innocence. She needed to "remember" that the true cause of her pain is her father's child sexual abuse of her. Lucy, Betsy's mother, has the same revelation because she witnessed the sexual assault, which she and Betsy repressed. Betsy poisons her now bed-ridden father with medicine while her mother watches. Betsy is then seen at her father's grave, and she is never haunted again.

In present day, the mother's daughter says her father has come to take her for their weekend stay. She sends her daughter to her ex-husband, who is waiting outside. Betsy's ghost suddenly appears and looks ominous. The mother realizes Betsy is trying to warn her that something is amiss between her daughter and her ex-husband.

She runs out of her house and catches a glimpse of her daughter's worried face peering out from the car window as it drives away; the implication is that the father is sexually abusing her. She runs after her ex-husband's car, frantically yelling his name.

== Cast ==
- Donald Sutherland as John Bell
- Sissy Spacek as Lucy Bell
- James D'Arcy as Richard Powell
- Rachel Hurd-Wood as Betsy Bell / Entity Voice
- Matthew Marsh as James Johnston
- Thom Fell as John Bell, Jr.
- Zoe Thorne as Theny Thorn
- Gaye Brown as Kate Batts
- Sam Alexander as Joshua Gardner
- Miquel Brown as Chloe
- Shauna Shim as Anky
- Roger Greenslade as Conteen
- Marthyn Huges as Julong
- Isabelle Almgren-Doré as Jane

== Production ==
=== Screenplay ===
The screenplay for An American Haunting was adapted by director Courtney Solomon from Brent Monahan's novel The Bell Witch: An American Haunting (1995), which documents the alleged Bell Witch haunting experienced by the Bell family in rural 1810s Tennessee. Like Monahan's novel, the screenplay suggests that the supernatural occurrences experienced by the Bell family manifested as poltergeist activity, unconsciously generated by the family's daughter, Betsy, whom Monahan infers was being sexually abused by her father. Commenting on the screenplay, Solomon said:

There are certain aspects of the screenplay that do follow the original legend itself, which I felt was important to try to stay true to, because it’s historically documented, and there are many people that take it seriously. As far as the ending and what happens to Betsy Bell, that was something that was unique to the book and the author of the book, Brent Monahan. He had come up with that, and it was something that I felt was a believable cause—because essentially, it is an unsolved mystery.

=== Casting ===
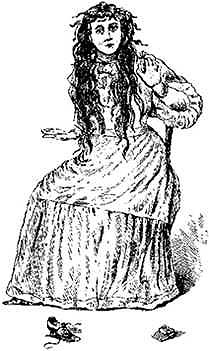
Rachel Hurd-Wood (left) was cast in the role of Betsy Bell (right, 1894 illustration)

Donald Sutherland was cast in the film as the family patriarch, John Bell. Sutherland commented that he felt drawn to the material due to his own supernatural experiences in a home he resided in in Quebec. Sissy Spacek was cast in the role of John's wife Lucy. Spacek stated that she was intrigued by the screenplay and its historical references: "The fact that it is a legend and has been so documented intrigued me, particularly with someone who became president [referring to Andrew Jackson]. But even if it wasn’t a documented story, even if all these books hadn’t been written about it, I thought it could stand on its own as a film."

Rachel Hurd-Wood was cast as the Bell's eldest daughter, Betsy. Commenting on starring in a horror film, Hurd-Wood said: "It’s more just the story that I found intriguing. And the character... I was really drawn to the whole project. It was really, really cool doing a horror movie as well."

James D'Arcy was cast in the role of Richard Powell, Lucy's schoolteacher who becomes invested in her alleged supernatural experiences.

=== Filming ===
Principal photography began in October 2004 in Romania, with a largely British and Romanian crew. Actress Hurd-Wood performed some of her own stunts in the film, including a sequence in which she is dragged up a staircase: "That was painful, and it took all day, and it was tiring," she recalled. "Not only did I have to make sure I did the physical stuff, I had to cry and scream."

== Release ==
An American Haunting premiered at the AFI Film Festival on November 5, 2005. It was shown the same day at the San Sebastián International Film Festival's "Fantasy and Horror Film Week" series. It was distributed theatrically in the United Kingdom the following spring, on April 4, 2006. Freestyle Releasing released the film in the United States on May 5, 2006, where it opened in 1,675 theaters.

=== Alternate versions ===
At least two different cuts of the film exist; the version originally shown in the United Kingdom ran longer than the North American release, and featured a different ending. The cut of the film shown in the United Kingdom has been described as "radically different" from the version released in the United States. The United Kingdom version of the film also features voice-over narration from James D'Arcy, which was excised from the United States theatrical cut.

In an interview promoting the film's release, Solomon commented that he chose to re-cut the film for American audiences after its premiere at the AFI Film Festival in 2005:

The critics and the audience at AFI that helped me realize what some of the flaws were in the first version. And because I started to think to myself, 'If ten of the ten people say the same thing, and especially after my Dungeons and Dragons experience, it's going to be a hundred thousand of a hundred thousand people.' They’re pretty much going to say the same thing—maybe ninety-nine point nine nine nine nine nine. They can’t all be wrong. So I think if you can do it, you should do it and I luckily got myself into a position where I could do it.

=== Home media ===
Lionsgate released An American Haunting on DVD in rated and unrated version on October 24, 2006. Alliance Atlantis released a Blu-ray edition of the film in Canada on August 10, 2010.

== Reception ==
=== Box office ===
The film earned $6,380,000 in the United States during its opening weekend. It completed its theatrical run in the United States with a gross of $16,298,046, in addition to $13,314,091 internationally, for a worldwide gross of $29,612,137.

=== Critical response ===
An American Haunting was panned by critics. On the review aggregator website Rotten Tomatoes, 12% of 66 critics' reviews are positive. The website's consensus reads: "Well, it looks good. But wasn't it supposed to be scary?" Metacritic, which uses a weighted average, assigned the film a score of 38 out of 100, based on 100 critics, indicating "generally unfavorable" reviews.

Michael Gingold of Fangoria praised the film's performances and period detail, but criticized it for its "metronomic" plotting and its resolution, in which "Solomon attempts a psychological twist on what has heretofore been a supernatural situation; yet while it’s intellectually intriguing, it just doesn’t work dramatically, and the explanation contradicts a good amount of what we’ve previously been shown. When the movie jumps back to the present day for its conclusion, it’s clear that Solomon intended the revelation to give the tale resonance with our current times, but it serves mostly to point up how gratuitous the framing device is."

Ain't It Cool News favorably commented on the film's cinematography and "excellent" acting from the cast. The Savannah Morning News also commended the performances as a notable strong point, writing that the film's "overbearing clamor is redeemed to a large extent by engaging performances and fine 19th century period detail." David Germain of the Hartford Courant echoed this sentiment, praising the lead performances: "The actors are the saving grace, Spacek (the combination heroine-victim-villain of another unsubtle fright flick, Carrie) is a grand matriarch, Sutherland a confident man undone by powers outside his understanding, Hurd-Wood a mix of radiant approaching womanhood and animal terror." Germain concluded of the film: "Creepy as it is at times, [An] American Haunting loses much of its fright potential amid the frenzied visuals and screeching vocalizations Solomon employs." Writing for The Village Voice, Jim Ridley noted that Sutherland and Spacek are "overqualified for a project that relies mainly on shaky-cam mayhem and snarling wolves amped to 11. The movie creates some moody Hammer-horror atmospherics using shadows, candlelight, and darkened woods. But when it comes to the kind of blatant shocks favored by mall rats, the limits of Solomon’s toolbox become painfully apparent."

Nathan Lee of The New York Times described the film as derivative of The Exorcist and added that it "exchanges bottom-barrel metaphysics for even cheaper psychology." Nigel Floyd of Time Out noted that the film "is weighed down by period detail and ponderous storytelling, which soon get the better of its Exorcist-inspired levitations, flying crucifixes and noisy poltergeist activity." Matthew Leyland of the BBC awarded the film a two out of four star-rating, describing the film as "unoriginal and unrelenting" and criticizing its use of special effects. Philip French of The Guardian unfavorably described the film as "dull, derivative stuff, supposedly based on a true story." Kim Newman, writing for Empire, panned the film, awarding it a one-star rating out of five, and describing it as "a noisy, busy effort with hand-wringing performances and a camera that won’t sit still to let any atmosphere creep in."

=== Accolades ===
| Award/association | Year | Category | Recipient(s) and nominee(s) | Result | Ref. |
|---|---|---|---|---|---|
| Fangoria Chainsaw Awards | 2006 | Creepiest Kid | Rachel Hurd-Wood | Nominated | |
| Golden Trailer Awards | 2006 | Best Horror Trailer | An American Haunting | Nominated | |
| Stinkers Bad Movie Awards | 2006 | Least Scary Horror Movie | An American Haunting | Nominated | |
| Teen Choice Awards | 2006 | Choice Movie: Thriller | An American Haunting | Nominated | |
| Teen Choice Awards | 2006 | Choice Movie: Scream Scene | Rachel Hurd-Wood | Nominated | |

== See also ==
- The Bell Witch Haunting
