= Spector (band) =

British music band

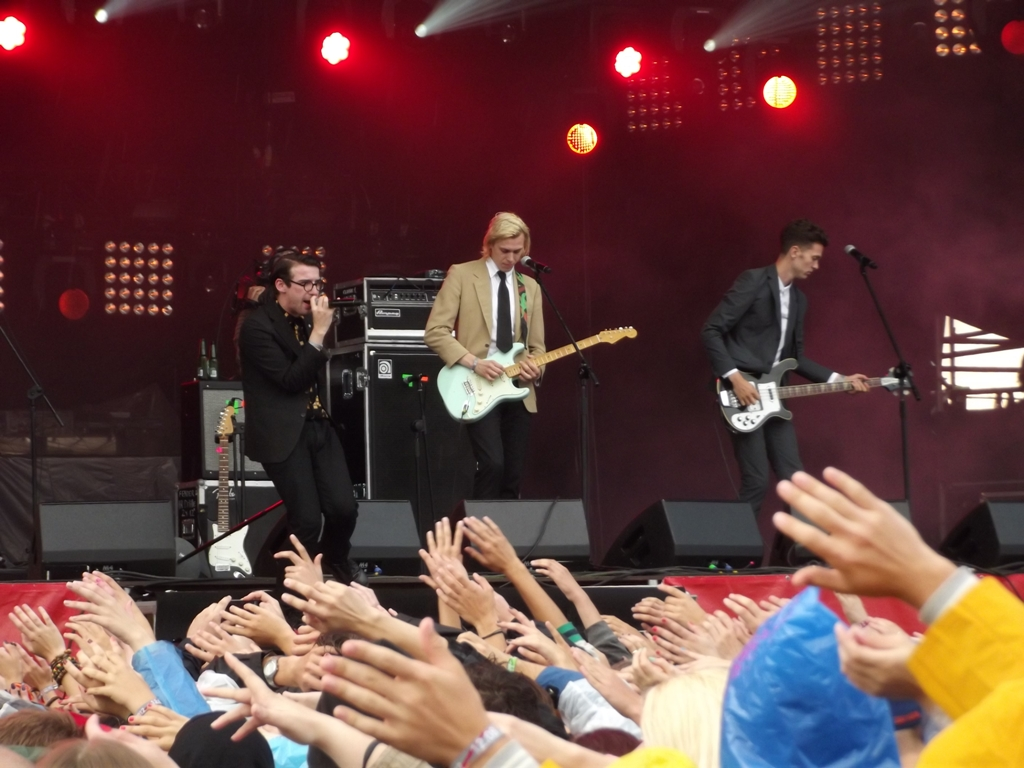
- Spector performing at the 2012 Coke Live Music Festival

Background information
- Origin: London, England
- Genres: Indie rock
- Years active: 2011–present
- Labels: Fiction; Moth Noise
- Members: Fred Macpherson; Jed Cullen; Nicolas Py; Jen Sanin
- Past members: Christopher Burman; Thomas Shickle; Yoann Intonti; Danny Blandy; Colin Mackin
- Website: spector.co.uk

Spector are a British indie rock band from London, composed of Frederick Macpherson (vocalist previously of Les Incompétents and Ox.Eagle.Lion.Man), Jed Cullen (guitar), Nicolas Py (drums) and Danny Blandy (keyboard, formerly drums). They've released five albums and one compilation. The band's debut album Enjoy It While It Lasts reached number 12 in the UK Albums Chart and went to number one on the Official Record Store Chart on the week of its release.

== History ==
Spector were formed in 2011 by former Les Incompétents and Ox.Eagle.Lion.Man frontman Fred Macpherson, and practiced and performed their first gigs in Efes Snooker Club in East London. Macpherson notes that the band have drawn inspiration from 1980s acts including Orchestral Manoeuvres in the Dark, Spandau Ballet and Ultravox.

In 2011, Spector were granted a session on BBC Radio 1 DJ Huw Stephens's radio show, and performed on the BBC Introducing stage at the Reading and Leeds Festival. They appeared on the live broadcast of Later... with Jools Holland on 22 November 2011 and performed their single "What You Wanted". On the longer, Friday-night show later that week they performed "Chevy Thunder" as well as "Never Fade Away", and it was announced that they would be releasing an album in 2012.

On 5 December 2011, the BBC announced that Spector had been nominated for the BBC's Sound of 2012 poll.

The band performed a headline UK tour in February 2012 and played as a support act for Florence and the Machine's March 2012 tour. Spector also performed their first gig in America at the Coachella Festival in April 2012.

=== Enjoy It While It Lasts ===
After releasing new single "Celestine" on 20 May 2012, the band revealed that their debut album would be called Enjoy It While It Lasts. The album was released on 13 August 2012 to mixed reviews, reaching number 12 in the UK Album Charts and topping the Official Record Store Chart.

In August 2012, the band played at the Reading and Leeds Festival for the second time, this time on the much larger NME/Radio 1 stage. Following the two dates, Spector announced album track "Friday Night, Don't Ever Let It End" would be released as a single on Monday 12 November 2012. A music video for the single, directed by Alan Del Rio, was released on 7 October 2012.

In October 2012, Spector embarked on promotional tours in Singapore and Malaysia respectively, sponsored by Topman and Universal Music Asia. Following this, the band completed their third UK tour, supported by British indie rock bands Swim Deep, Splashh and LULS. Spector performed at XFM's 'Winter Wonderland' event in December 2012, alongside acts including Bloc Party, Maxïmo Park and Everything Everything. Frontman Fred Macpherson was nominated in the "Best Twitter" and "Villain of the Year" categories at the 2013 NME Awards. In March 2013, the band performed as main support act for Suede at an Alexandra Palace concert.

Spector has a tech team, with a separate fan following via social media platforms Instagram and Twitter, called 'SpectorTech'.

=== Moth Boys ===
It was announced on 12 July 2013 that Christopher Burman had left the band, with touring members set to fulfil his duties on guitar and synthesizer on upcoming concert dates. The group performed at the Reading & Leeds Festival for the third consecutive year in August 2013, before making their first appearance at Glastonbury Festival in 2014, albeit with their set delayed/curtailed due to a severe electrical storm. Their Glastonbury 2014 set included the live debut of two new tracks, "Stay High" and "Bad Boyfriend". Two more new tracks, "Don't Make Me Try" and "All the Sad Young Men", were performed at a show at Leeds in July.

On 8 December 2014, the new single "Don't Make Me Try" was premiered on Zane Lowe's BBC Radio One show, with a music video for the song being premiered at Noisey the same day. On 3 February 2015, a second single, "All the Sad Young Men", was premiered as Zane Lowe's 'Hottest Record in the World'. In a Twitter Q+A, it was confirmed as the first song on their upcoming album. The band also confirmed an "intimate" gig at London's The Lexington on 12 March to support the release.

On 30 June 2015 they announced their second album, Moth Boys, was to be released through Fiction Records on 21 August that year. The band followed up with an "intimate set and signing" tour to promote their album. They also announced an accompanying UK tour, spanning 13 dates in October with Yoann Intonti on the drums and Spring King and Bill Ryder Jones as supporting acts.

=== Moth Noise ===
On 1 December 2017, after almost a year after their last shows in the UK, the single "Untitled in D" was released on their own Moth Noise label. It was the first song from an EP that was released in January, along with other tracks "Fine Not Fine", "Local International" and "Wild Guess". Describing the track, frontman Fred Macpherson said: "Untitled in D's been burning a hole in Spector's pocket for a little while now. I wrote the bones of it pretty quickly then Jed came through and channelled the ghost of John Frusciante on guitar and we knew we were on to something. After the sheen of our first two albums it was exciting capturing something simple and irreverent – the sound of us playing in a room rather than playing in a computer".

The EP, titled Ex-Directory, was finally released on 9 March 2018, along with a video for "Fine Not Fine" directed by Sarah Pearson and shot in and around Taroudant. Spector announced an accompanying UK tour, with seven dates in May 2018 along with appearances at festivals including Reading and Leeds Festival. In December 2018 they surprise released a second EP called Spector Reloaded.

On 4 June 2019, the band released a non-album single, titled "I Won't Wait". Two more singles, titled "Half Life" and "Simplicity", followed on 6 August and 18 October, respectively. On 31 March 2020, a four-track EP called Extended Play was released, comprising these three tracks as well as one new song, titled "When Did We Get So Normal?"

On 19 February 2020, the band announced the release of compilation Non-Fiction, comprising all three EPs, along with the unreleased demo "Bryndon 2", written by Bryndon Cook.

=== Now or Whenever ===
In June 2021, the band released the single "Catch You on the Way Back" and announced that their first studio album in six years would be soon released. The album, called Now or Whenever was originally scheduled to be released on 1 October 2021, but was pushed back until 7 January 2022 due to vinyl manufacturing delays. It charted at Number 40 on the UK Albums Chart.

=== Here Come the Early Nights ===
In September 2023, the band announced the release that their next album, called Here Come the Early Nights would be released in November 2023. The band also announced a UK tour for November and December 2023 and released the single "The Notion" from the album. The album was released on the 24th of November 2023.

== Discography ==
=== Studio albums ===
Title	Details	Peak chart positions	
Title	Details	UK	UK Record Store
Enjoy It While It Lasts	Released: 13 August 2012; Label: Fiction; Formats: CD, LP, digital download	12	1
Moth Boys	Released: 21 August 2015; Label: Fiction; Formats: CD, LP, digital download	27	1
Now or Whenever	Released: 7 January 2022; Label: Moth Noise; Formats: CD, LP record, cassette, digital download	40	3
Here Come the Early Nights	Released: 24 November 2023; Label: Moth Noise; Formats: CD, LP record, cassette, digital download	—	5

=== Compilations ===
Title	Details	Peak chart positions
Title	Details	UK Record Store
Non-Fiction	Released: 1 June 2020; Label: Moth Noise; Formats: LP	10

=== Extended plays ===
- Ex-Directory (9 March 2018)
- Reloaded (30 November 2018)
- Extended Play (31 March 2020)

=== Singles ===
Year	Title	Album
2011	"Never Fade Away": 29 April 2011	Enjoy It While It Lasts
2011	"What You Wanted": 19 September 2011	Enjoy It While It Lasts
2011	"Grey Shirt and Tie": 5 December 2011	Enjoy It While It Lasts
2012	"Chevy Thunder": 26 January 2012	Enjoy It While It Lasts
2012	Celestine: 20 May 2012	Enjoy It While It Lasts
2012	"Friday Night, Don't Ever Let It End": 15 October 2012	Enjoy It While It Lasts
2014	"Don't Make Me Try": 9 December 2014	Moth Boys
2015	"All the Sad Young Men": 3 February 2015	Moth Boys
2015	"Bad Boyfriend": 8 June 2015	Moth Boys
2015	"Stay High": 21 August 2015	Moth Boys
2016	"Born in the EU": 21 June 2016	Non-album single
2017	"Untitled in D": 1 December 2017	Ex-Directory EP
2019	"I Won't Wait"	Extended Play
2019	"Half Life"	Extended Play
2019	"Simplicity"	Extended Play
2021	"Catch You On The Way Back In"	Now or Whenever
2021	"Funny Way Of Showing It"	Now or Whenever
2021	"Bad Summer"	Now or Whenever
2021	"No One Knows Better"	Now or Whenever
2021	"Country Boy"	Non-album single
2021	"I'm Not Crying You're Crying"	Now or Whenever
2022	"Felony"	Non-album single

== Awards and nominations ==
Year	Organisation	Award	Result
2011	BBC Sound of 2012	Sound of 2012	Nominated
2013	NME Awards	Villain of the Year	Nominated
2013	NME Awards	Twitter of the Year	Nominated
