= Les Incompétents =

Indie rock band from London (2004–2006)

- Origin: London, England, UK
- Genre: Indie rock
- Years active: 2004–2006
- Members: Billy Leeson; Frederick Macpherson; Christopher Burman; Craig Clydesdale; Shaun Paterson; Tommy 'Atomic' Howson; Lawrence of Templeton; Olli Rose

Les Incompétents were an English indie rock band from London, England. They released a number of singles culminating in a compilation of their work, End of an Error (2004-2006). Members of Les Incompetents have gone on to form further bands, most notably Ox.Eagle.Lion.Man and Spector.

== History ==
The band released their debut single "Re-union"/"Much Too Much" in summer 2005 through White Heat Recordings, which received national airplay. They were also highly rated by the record store Rough Trade, who listed "Reunion"/"Much Too Much" as their fourteenth favourite single of 2005. Their second single, "How It All Went Wrong", released in March 2006, was limited to 1,500 copies and sold out on the day of its release. The low budget music video was filmed by directors Type2Error at the Tatty Bogle Club in London, where the band rehearsed.

The band were noted for their live shows and association with the Way Out West club in London. During their live career they supported, amongst others, Mystery Jets, Eighties Matchbox B-Line Disaster and Babyshambles.

=== Assault on Billy Leeson ===
On 22 June 2006, Les Incompétents' frontman, Billy Leeson was involved in an argument with New Zealander peace activist, former Green Party candidate, Christiaan Briggs, after getting off a bus in Camden Road, Holloway, North London. According to news reports, this followed an argument on the bus after Leeson accused Briggs of looking at Leeson's girlfriend, Elli Bradshaw; Briggs followed the couple off the bus and then punched Leeson who then fell and hit his head on the ground. Two witnesses claim Briggs walked away "smirking", although Briggs' lawyers have claimed he was "smiling nervously". Leeson was in a coma, and listed in critical condition for three weeks following surgery to remove a piece of skull that was pushing into his brain, causing it to swell. He regained consciousness on 27 July and was released from the hospital, but required a metal plate in his head. Briggs turned himself in to police when the extent of Leeson's injuries was reported in the news. Briggs was sentenced to eight months in prison on 23 October. Leeson does not remember the attack.

=== Split ===
On 1 September 2006, the band announced via a bulletin and blog-post on MySpace that they were splitting up. The news came just after their V Festival performance had been aired on Channel 4's Whatever programme. After selling out London's 100 Club on 7 November 2006, they played their final gig at Acton Town Hall on 11 November 2006.

In March 2007, the band released End of an Error (2004-2006), a collection of all their recorded material, on White Heat Records, including singles, b-sides, early demos, an introduction featuring David Walliams and live performances from XFM sessions.

=== Post-split ===
In November 2007, a new band containing Paterson, Macpherson and Tommy Atomic of Ox.Eagle.Lion.Man released their debut single via the Transgressive Records. As of 2011, Macpherson and Burman are performing as members of Spector.

== Name ==
According to the band, in an interview with John Kennedy on XFM, their name is pronounced as it is written, with the French plural for 'the' pronounced like the English name 'Les', as if it is a British person's attempt at speaking French. "It's meant to sound like an English person mispronouncing a French word/words. Or it's a man called Les, with the surname Incompétents". The name is taken from a quote from the 1990 film Home Alone.
