= Ox.Eagle.Lion.Man =

British rock band (2006–2010)

Ox.Eagle.Lion.Man.
- Also known as: Ox Eagle Lion Man, OELM
- Origin: London, England, UK
- Genres: Alternative rock Progressive rock Folk rock
- Years active: 2006–2010
- Label: Transgressive
- Spinoff of: Les Incompetents
- Past members: Frederick 'Blood-Royale' Macpherson; Thomas 'Günnzs' Howson; Eduard Quarmby; Tobi O'Kandi
- Website: http://www.myspace.com/oxeaglelionman

Ox.Eagle.Lion.Man. (sometimes written as Ox Eagle Lion Man) was a British band, comprising elements of prog rock, folk and post punk.

== History ==
The band formed in December 2006, a month after the break-up of Les Incompétents. Singer Fred MacPherson and bassist Tommy Howson were joined on drums by the former Bono Must Die frontman Tobi O'Kandi. The latter had previously been the lead singer of O. Children. After demos were recorded, O'Kandi left to be replaced by Eduard Quarmby. Transgressive Records issued their debut single, "Motherhood/Fatherhood", (produced by Gordon Raphael) and subsequent EPs.

They played with Four Tet, Bono Must Die, The Polyphonic Spree, These New Puritans, Emmy The Great and toured with Lightspeed Champion and The Scare.

Rather than recording an album, the band planned a sequence of EPs, or "Opera"; "The Lay of the Land, the Turn of the Tide" being Opus 1 and "Obscured By a Setting Sun" being Opus 2, which was released in November 2008.

The name of the band is suggestive of both Hebrew and Greek scriptural references—at Ezekiel 1:10 and Revelation 4:7, respectively—of the cardinal attributes of God personified and displayed by his four attending creatures. These creatures were described as having the faces of an ox, an eagle, a lion, and a man—singularly or collectively on each one's head—representing a perfect balance of power, wisdom, justice, and love.

Macpherson left the band to form Spector with former Les Incompétents bandmate Chris Burman.

== MTV2 UK ==
Frederick Macpherson was briefly a presenter/reporter for MTV2 UK.

== Discography ==
- "Fatherhood/Motherhood" Double A Side, Transgressive Records, November 2007
- "Opus 1: The Lay of the Land; The Turn of the Tide" EP, Transgressive Records, June 2008
- "Opus 2: Obscured by a Setting Sun" EP, Transgressive Records, November 2008

== Videography ==
- "Motherhood" - Directed by George Fafalios
- "Fatherhood" - Directed by Blake Claridge
- "The Drowned & The Saved" - Directed by Jamie Jones
