= Western Pseudohistory Theory =

Chinese conspiracy theory

The term "Western Pseudohistory Theory" (simplified Chinese: 西方伪史论; traditional Chinese: 西方偽史論; pinyin: Xīfāng wěi shǐ lùn) is a catch-all term referring to a series of Russian-inspired Chinese fringe theories that question the authenticity and reliability of Western history, and which generally hold that the histories of ancient Greece, ancient Egypt, and ancient Rome contain a large number of fabrications, or even that all of them are fabricated. Many elements of this theory are borrowed from the Russian mathematician Anatoly Fomenko's new chronology theory, and the term has thus been traced back to 18th-century French priest and classical scholar Jean Hardouin. In 2013, after He Xin, a former researcher at the Chinese Academy of Social Sciences (CASS), published his book Research on Pseudo-history of Greece questioning the existence of ancient Greece, this theory gradually spread on the Chinese Internet. The Chinese historiography and classics community either completely disagrees with this theory or simply does not want to spend time refuting these claims.

== History ==
At the end of the twentieth century, Fomenko put forward some fringe theories in his books that questioned world history, for example, he argued that no artifacts had been found in Russia prior to the 10th century A.D., and therefore world history could not have predated the 10th century A.D. Fomenko's theory was heavily criticized by historians. An article in Xinmin Weekly, an article in Southern Weekly, and an article by Chow Hin in Orange News, all cite Fomenko as one of the origins the theory, with the Xinmin Weekly's article going even further back to Hardouin.

In 2013, He Xin published Research on Pseudo-history of Greece, which claimed that there were a large number of fabrications in the history of Greece. In 2015, Du Gangjian put forward the theory of Out-of-Hunan, which argued that human beings did not originate from Africa, but from Hunan. In 2018, a documentary produced by Gleb Nosovsky made Fomenko's theories spread on the Chinese Internet, and in July 2019, the Chinese-British scholar Zhu Xuanshi said that there was no history of Europe before the 15th century, and that Western civilization had faked the three civilizations of ancient Greece, Egypt and Rome with reference to Chinese culture. The same year, Xiang Qianjing, the CEO of Beijing Tairen Classic Chinese Medicine Technology Co., Ltd, interested in the theory, funded and proposed to hold a "Western History Falsification and Chinese Culture Renaissance Symposium" every two years, which led to the further dissemination of the theory in China.

In February 2021, Huang Heqing, a professor of art history at Zhejiang University, stated in a lecture that the Great Pyramid of Giza and the Great Sphinx of Giza were fakes. An analysis of videos on the Chinese video site Bilibili shows that the earliest relevant videos were posted in 2019, after which the number of relevant videos rose in 2021 and became popular on the platform in 2022. In 2024, Chen Zhixin, an associate professor at Beijing Normal University, uploaded lecture videos to Bilibili claiming that Greek and ancient Roman civilizations were "pseudohistory" fabricated by the West. In June 2025, a number of personal media accounts promoting the theory were banned.

== Details ==
=== Ancient Egypt ===
Fomenko asserted that the pyramids were fabricated by the Egyptian government in 1901 using concrete blocks for the development of tourism because of small holes in the construction materials. Huang Heqing said in 2021 that the pyramids were fabricated by the Egyptians using concrete in order to "belittle the Chinese civilization".

In August 2025, Huang Heqing and others debated with Tang Jigen and others on issues such as the age of the grass-woven artifacts in the Shanghai Museum's ancient Egyptian artifact exhibition. Huang Heqing said that the artifacts in the exhibition were "brand new."

=== Ancient Greece, Italy and the Renaissance ===
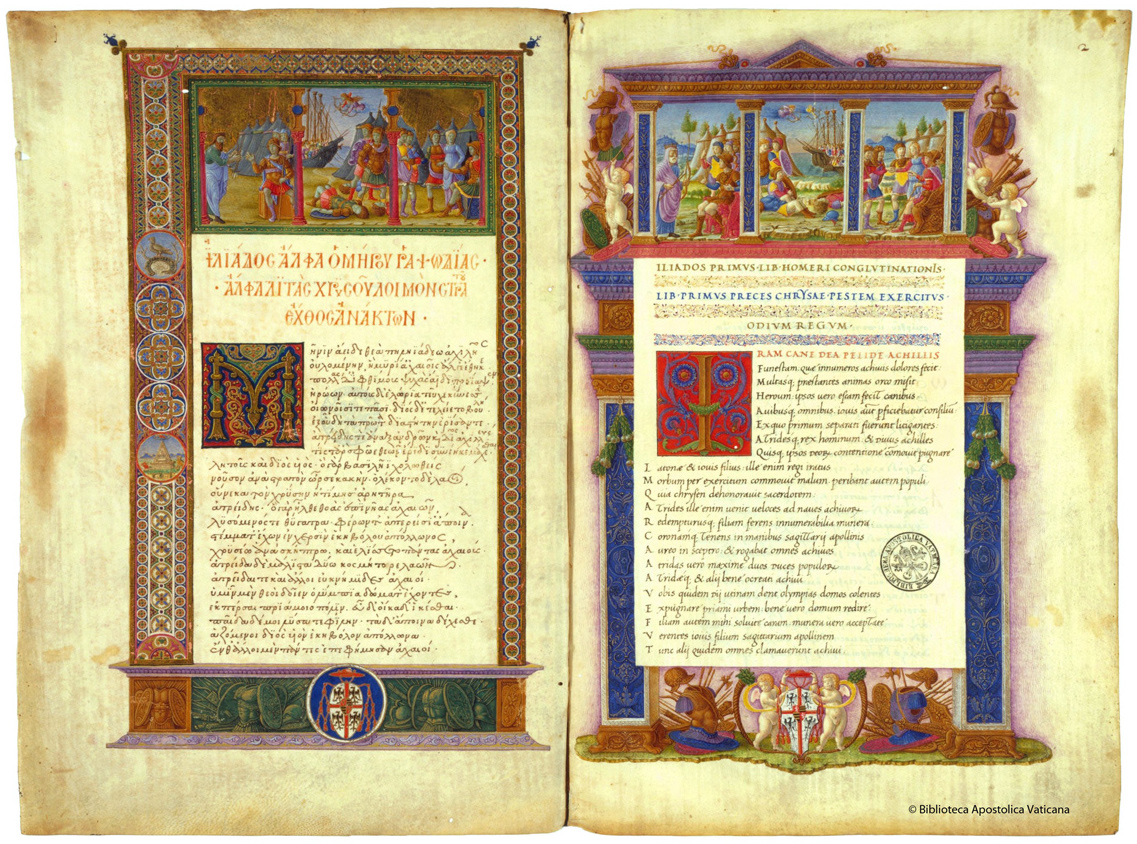
Bilingual Iliad, in Greek and Latin

In 2013, He Xin, a former researcher at the CASS, published Research on Pseudo-history of Greece. In the book, He argued that all ancient Greek classics were forged during the Renaissance. For instance, he argued that Leontius Pilatus and Giovanni Boccaccio tampered with the original text of the Iliad in the course of translating it from Greek to Latin, commissioned by Francesco Petrarch, and that this tampered Latin translation became the reference text for later translations in other languages, and He Xin claimed that this series of events was manipulated by the Freemasons.

In addition, the existence of Aristotle had also been questioned, as He Xin argued that Aristotle himself did not exist, based on the fact that, due to the problem of transcription, Miao Litian, the author of the Chinese edition of the Works of Aristotle, had stated that some of Aristotle's writings may had been incorrectly copied by later generations. In 2017, Chen Ping, a professor of economics at Fudan University, expressed his agreement with Fomenko and He Xin, and stated that due to the high value of papyrus and parchment, it is impossible for ancient Greek documents to have survived intact into the Renaissance, and therefore "could only have been fabricated by people hired by Italian bankers during the Renaissance". In addition, documents in Arabic introduced to Europe during the Renaissance were also thought to be non-existent, and Chen Ping believed that they were fabricated by the House of Medici. In 2023, a video clip of Jin Canrong went viral on the Internet in which he claimed that ancient Greek philosophers, including Aristotle, did not exist because no relevant written records, according to him, could be found prior to the 13th century.

In 2024, in an interview with Southern Weekly, Huang Heqing argued that ancient Greek sculpture and architecture were too fine, and also argued that ancient Greece at that time could not have had iron tools, so it was impossible to sculpt; while ancient Greece's rivals in this period were fabricated to play as a rivalry to Western history, for example, the temperature of the Iranian plateau was very high in the spring so that it was not possible to give birth to such a state as the Achaemenid Empire.

=== Industrialization ===
According to some self-publishers, the steam engine and electricity were alleged ancient Chinese inventions, and the Industrial Revolution was allegedly based on stolen technology from the Yongle Dadian.

== Reception ==
=== Academic ===
Fomenko's theories have been heavily criticized by the Russian scientific community. In 1999, the Russian Academy of Sciences (of which Fomenko was an Academician of) organized a conference dedicated for his theories, during which scientists from various disciplines had questioned the methodology of Fomenko's research and provided historical perspectives on the errors or shortcuts in historical texts denounced by Fomenko.

A 2013 article, "The Triumph of the 'Academic Boxer Rebellion'" by Gao Fengfeng, accused He Xin of being "unreasonable without evidence" and claimed that He Xin's theory lacked evidence and argument. In 2018, Science and Technology Daily interviewed Guo Zilin, a researcher at the CASS who conducts archaeology in Egypt, who said that the small holes in the pyramid are caused by the weathering of sandstone, one of the main materials of the pyramid, making part of the sand flow out. Gao Fengfeng gave a rebuttal to Huang Heqing's claim in 2024, citing Marbleworkers in the Athenian Agora and Feeding the Democracy, through which he specifically analyzed ancient Greek sculpture and ancient Greek agricultural production.

In 2024, reporters from Southern Weekly tried to contact Chinese scholars of classical studies to ask them to talk about their views on the Western Pseudohistory Theory, but most of the scholars refused to be interviewed, and most of them said that they did not want to waste their time with these absurd remarks. One professor, who asked to remain anonymous, said that adherents of the theory did not "respect basic historical facts" and did not "reason with you"; Gao Fengfeng, a professor at Peking University, was the only one willing to be interviewed under his own name, and said that the believers are committing a reverse onus clause. A 2024 article in the Journal of Central China Normal University argued that China's economic takeoff and national power growth, the deterioration of U.S.–China relations and even China's relations with the West, and China's anti-Western sentiments gave rise to a "strong mentality of arrogance and self-importance", which was embodied in the "Western Pseudohistory Theory".

In 2025, Zhai Defang, former chief editor of SDX Joint Publishing, expressed opposition to the narrative. He cited the archaeological adage "dry for a thousand years, wet for ten thousand", i.e. under arid conditions, typical artifacts can endure for a thousand years, while immersion in water could extend preservation even further, to refute claims that "the straw sandal statue looks like it was woven last week." He also suggested, "Among this pile, there might have been over thirty pairs, but the others rotted beyond recognition. The best pair was taken by the excavators, and the next best was left behind in Egypt—that's the one brought here for exhibition." He also drew comparisons with Chinese excavations, such as the "Five stars rising in the East" artifact, which similarly appeared remarkably well-preserved. Zhai Defang noted that Chinese archaeologists, including Xia Nai, participated in excavations of ancient Egyptian artifacts, and ancient West Asian relics have also been discovered in Chinese archaeological sites. Therefore, he stated that the claim of systematic forgery is unlikely to be accurate.

=== Others ===
The Chinese government has never publicly endorsed the Western Pseudohistory Theory, and it has faced repeated criticisms from state-run media organizations. For instance, a September 2019 article in the People's Daily criticized the theory for its unfounded arrogance towards other cultures, while a June 2025 article in Xinmin Evening News criticized its outlandish claims and its inability to provide a credible alternative to the conventional historiography, which sowed confusion and division among the general public. In addition, a July 2025 article in China Youth Daily argued the theory represented a form of cultural insecurity, as well as damaged the reputation of Chinese academia. However, an article by Mark Siemons in the Frankfurter Allgemeine Zeitung and another by Tristan G. Brown in Made in China Journal both contend that Western Pseudohistory Theory align with the official Chinese narrative to some extent.

== See also ==
- Doubting Antiquity School
- Phantom time conspiracy theory
- Robert Baldauf
- Sino-Babylonianism
- Sun Language Theory
- Tartarian Empire
- Martin Bernal
- Black Athena
