= New chronology (Fomenko) =

Pseudohistorical Russian theory

Fomenko's History: Fiction or Science? Chronology, volumes 1–7

The new chronology is a pseudohistorical theory which argues that events generally attributed to the ancient civilizations of Rome, Greece and Egypt, among others, actually occurred during the Middle Ages, more than a thousand years later. The theory, which further proposes that world history prior to 1600 AD was centered around a global empire called Great Tartaria, has been widely falsified to suit the interests of a number of different conspirators, including the Vatican, the Holy Roman Empire, and the Russian House of Romanov. The theory was first widely disseminated in the 1990s by Russian chess grandmaster Garry Kasparov and later by mathematician Anatoly Fomenko. Reception from mainstream scholars has been universally negative.

== Central concepts ==
The concepts that constitute the new chronology has its origins in the work of Nikolai Morozov (1854–1946), although the earlier work of Jean Hardouin (1646–1729) can be seen as an intellectual progenitor. The new chronology per se is most commonly associated with Anatoly Fomenko, though he has collaborated extensively in his writing on the subject. The theory is most fully explained in History: Fiction or Science?, originally published in Russian.

The new chronology features a totally reconstructed timeline, portraying a history that is radically shorter than what is universally accepted, based on a thesis that in effect compresses all of recorded history from the Neolithic to the Early Middle Ages into a period less than a millennium long. According to Fomenko's claims, the practice of written history only emerged c. 800 AD, with there being almost no real information about events that occurred between 800 and 1000 AD, and most recorded historical events actually having taken place between 1000 and 1500 AD.

The new chronology is universally rejected by the scientific and historiographical communities, being totally inconsistent with the accepted methodology used in the relevant fields, including absolute and relative dating techniques. It is considered to be pseudoarchaeological, pseudohistorical, and pseudoscientific. Interest in the theory from historians and scientists has primarily stemmed from its popularity among laypeople: in addition to formulating refutations of its methods and conclusions, academics have also tried to understand the social forces underlying its resonance: Halperin (2011) estimates that as many as 30% of Russians may have sympathy for the new chronology. However, it is not known what levels of veracity or salience are generally ascribed to new chronology texts by readers, whether the texts are generally regarded as history or as fiction, or what the demographics of their readership tend to be.

The theory emerged alongside numerous other pseudohistorical and conspiracy-minded literature in a period of heightened nationalism and more lax restrictions on freedom of the press following the dissolution of the Soviet Union. While other authors have written on the new chronology theory, such as Russian Gleb Nosovsky and Bulgarian Yordan Tabov (who expanded the theory relating to the Balkans), the theory is mostly understood in terms of Fomenko's writings.

== History of the new chronology ==
The idea of chronologies that differ from the conventional chronology can be traced back to the second half of the 17th century or earlier. Jean Hardouin suggested that many ancient historical documents were younger than commonly believed. In 1685, he published a version of Pliny the Elder's Natural History in which he claimed that most Greek and Roman texts had been forged by Benedictine monks. When later questioned on these results, Hardouin stated that he would reveal the monks' reasons in a letter to be revealed only after his death. The executors of his estate were unable to find such a document among his posthumous papers. In the 17th century, Sir Isaac Newton, examining the current chronology of Ancient Greece, Ancient Egypt and the Ancient Near East, expressed discontent with prevailing theories and in The Chronology of Ancient Kingdoms Amended proposed one of his own, which, basing its study on Apollonius of Rhodes's Argonautica, changed the traditional dating of the Argonautic Expedition, the Trojan War, and the Founding of Rome.

In 1887, Edwin Johnson expressed the opinion that early Christian history was largely invented or corrupted in the 2nd and 3rd centuries.

In 1909, Otto Rank made note of duplications in literary history of a variety of cultures:

almost all important civilized peoples have early woven myths around and glorified in poetry their heroes, mythical kings and princes, founders of religions, of dynasties, empires and cities—in short, their national heroes. Especially the history of their birth and of their early years is furnished with phantastic traits; the amazing similarity, nay literal identity, of those tales, even if they refer to different, completely independent peoples, sometimes geographically far removed from one another, is well known and has struck many an investigator.

Fomenko became interested in Morozov's theories in 1973. In 1980, together with a few colleagues from the mathematics department of Moscow State University, he published several articles on "new mathematical methods in history" in peer-reviewed journals. The articles stirred a lot of controversy, but ultimately Fomenko failed to win any respected historians to his side. By the early 1990s, Fomenko shifted his focus from trying to convince the scientific community via peer-reviewed publications to publishing books. Alex Beam writes that Fomenko and his colleagues were discovered by the Soviet scientific press in the early 1980s, leading to "a brief period of renown"; a contemporary review from the Soviet journal Questions of History complained that "their constructions have nothing in common with Marxist historical science."

By 1996, Fomenko's theory encompassed Russia, Turkey, China, Europe, and Egypt.

== Fomenko's claims ==
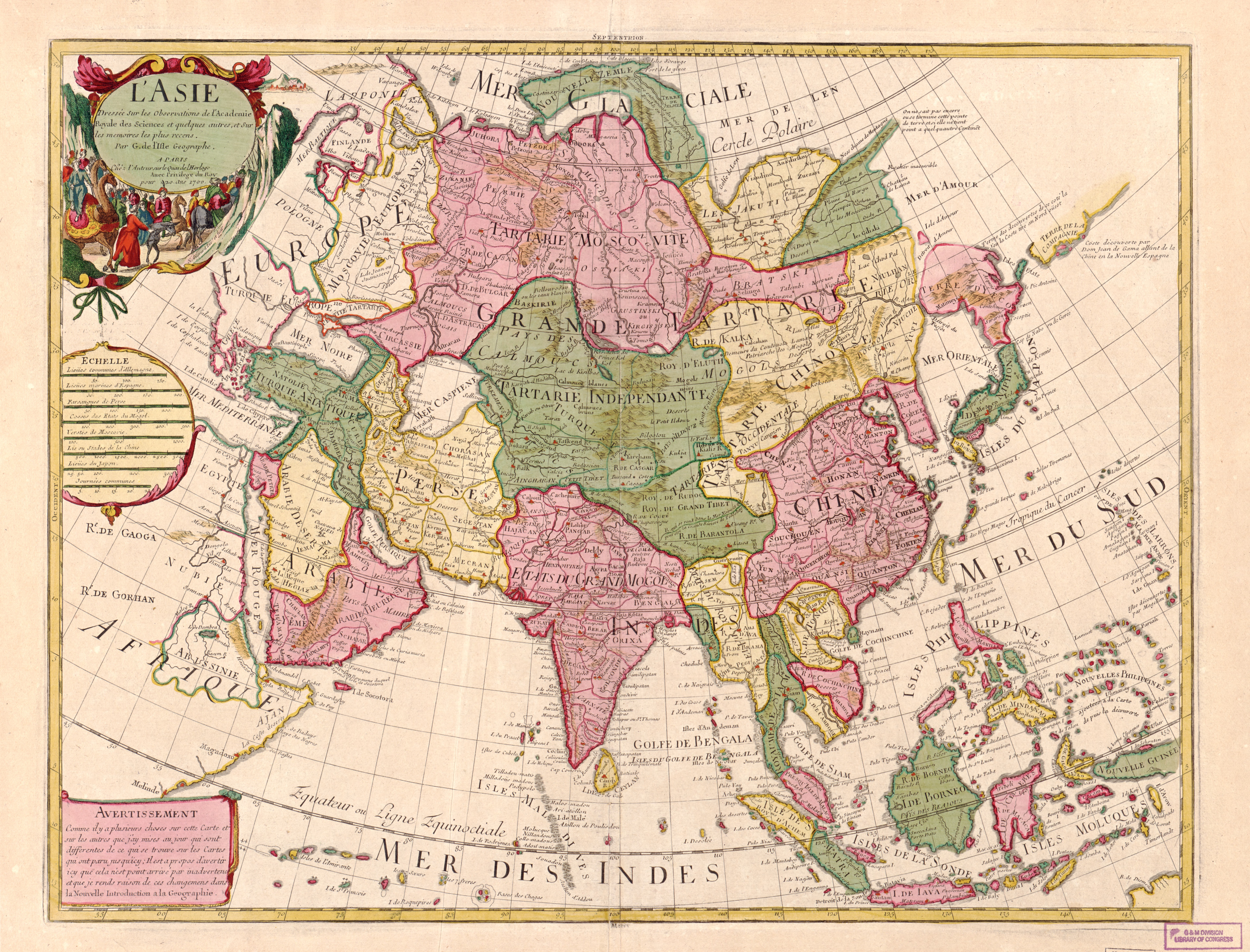
A 1700 map of Asia dividing "Great Tartary" into "Muscovite Tartary", "Chinese Tartary", and "Independent Tartary"

Central to Fomenko's new chronology is his claim of the existence of a vast Slav-Turk empire, called "the Russian Horde" (Great Tartaria), which played a dominant role in Eurasian history before the 17th century. The various peoples identified in ancient and medieval history, from the Scythians, Huns, Goths and Bulgars, through the Polans, Dulebes, Drevlians and Pechenegs, to in more recent times, the Cossacks, Ukrainians, and Belarusians, are nothing but elements of the single Russian Horde.

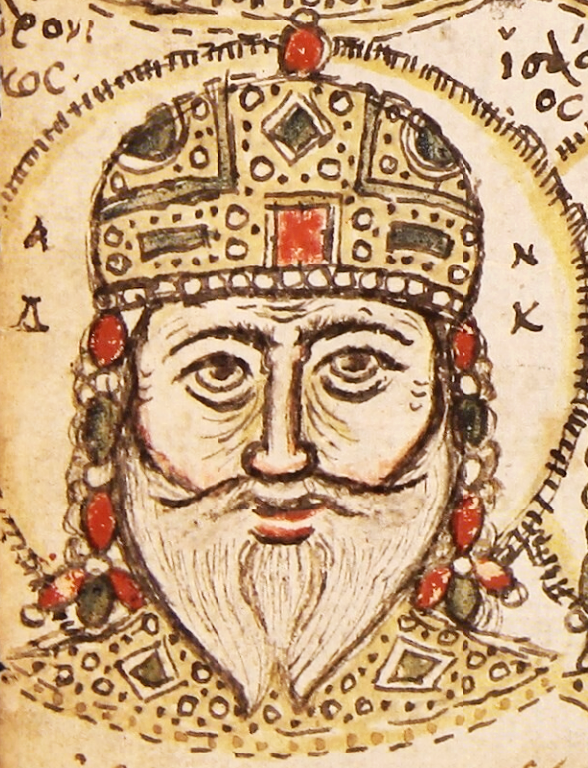
Andronikos I Komnenos, who Fomenko claims was the historical Jesus

Fomenko claims that the most probable prototype of the historical Jesus was Byzantine (Eastern Roman) Emperor Andronikos I Komnenos (allegedly AD 1152 to 1185), known for his failed reforms, his traits and deeds reflected in 'biographies' of many real and imaginary persons. The historical Jesus is also claimed a composite figure and reflection of the Old Testament prophet Elisha (850–800 BC?), Pope Gregory VII (1020?–1085), Saint Basil of Caesarea (330–379), and even Li Yuanhao (also known as Emperor Jingzong or "Son of Heaven" – emperor of Western Xia, who reigned in 1032–1048), Euclides, Bacchus and Dionysius. Fomenko explains the seemingly vast differences in the biographies of these figures as resulting from difference in languages, points of view and time-frame of the authors of said accounts and biographies. He claims that the historical Jesus was born in Cape Fiolent, Crimea, on December 25, 1152 A.D. and was crucified on March 20, 1185 A.D., on Joshua's Hill, overlooking the Bosphorus.

Fomenko's speculations combined the cities and histories of Jerusalem, Rome and Troy into "New Rome", which the Gospels identified as Jerusalem. He identified Troy as Yoros Castle. To the south of Yoros Castle is Joshua's Hill which Fomenko identified as the hill on which Calvary looks placed.

Fomenko claims the Hagia Sophia is the biblical Temple of Solomon and Solomon as the sultan Suleiman the Magnificent (1494–1566).

However, according to Fomenko the word "Rome" is a placeholder and can signify any one of several different cities and kingdoms. He claims: the "First Rome" or "Ancient Rome" or "Mizraim" is an ancient Egyptian kingdom in the delta of the Nile with its capital in Alexandria, that the second and most famous "New Rome" is Constantinople, and that the third "Rome" is constituted by three different cities: Constantinople (again), Rome in Italy, and Moscow. Also according to his claims, Rome in Italy was founded around AD 1380 by Aeneas and Moscow as the third Rome was the capital of the great "Russian Horde".

== Fomenko's methods ==
=== Astronomical evidence ===
Fomenko examines astronomical events described in ancient texts and claims that the chronology is actually medieval. For example:

- He explains the mysterious drop in the value of the lunar acceleration parameter D" ("a linear combination of the [angular] accelerations of the Earth and Moon") between the years AD 700–1300, which the American astronomer Robert Newton had explained in terms of "non-gravitational" forces. By eliminating those anomalous early eclipses the new chronology produces a constant value of D" beginning around AD 1000. Newton's analysis has since been criticized as suffering "from two fundamental defects. The two parameters he sought to determine were highly correlated; and he also adopted a somewhat arbitrary weighting scheme in analysing suspected observations of total solar eclipses. Many of the observations he investigated were of doubtful reliability. Hence, despite the low weight he assigned them, they had a disproportionate effect on his solutions."
- He associates initially the Star of Bethlehem with the AD 1140 (±20) supernova (now Crab Nebula) and the Crucifixion Eclipse with the total solar eclipse of May 1, AD 1185. He also believes that Crab Nebula supernova could not have been seen in AD 1054, but probably in AD 1153. He doubts the veracity of ancient Chinese astronomical data.
- He argues that the star catalog in the Almagest, ascribed to the Hellenistic astronomer Ptolemy, was compiled in the 15th to 16th centuries AD. With this objective in sight he develops new methods of dating old stellar catalogues and claims that the Almagest is based on data collected between AD 600 and 1300, whereby the telluric obliquity is well taken into account.
- He further develops Morozov's analysis of some ancient horoscopes, including the so-called Dendera Zodiacs—two horoscopes drawn on the ceiling of the temple of Hathor—and comes to the conclusion that they correspond to either the 11th or the 13th century AD. In his History: Fiction or Science series finale, he makes computer-aided dating of all 37 Egyptian horoscopes that contain sufficient astronomical data, and claims they all fit into 11th to 19th century timeframe. Traditional history usually either interprets these horoscopes as belonging to the 1st century BC or suggests that they weren't meant to match any date at all.
- In his final analysis of an eclipse triad described by the ancient Greek Thucydides in History of the Peloponnesian War, Fomenko dates the eclipses to AD 1039, 1046 and 1057. Because of the layered structure of the manuscript, he claims that Thucydides actually lived in medieval times and in describing the Peloponnesian War between the Spartans and Athenians he was actually describing the conflict when the Duchy of Athens and the Duchy of Neopatras in Greece, held by the Catalan Company, were attacked by the Navarrese Company in the late 14th century.
- Fomenko claims that the abundance of dated astronomical records in cuneiform texts from Mesopotamia is of little use for dating of events, as the astronomical phenomena they describe recur cyclically every 30–40 years.

== Reception ==
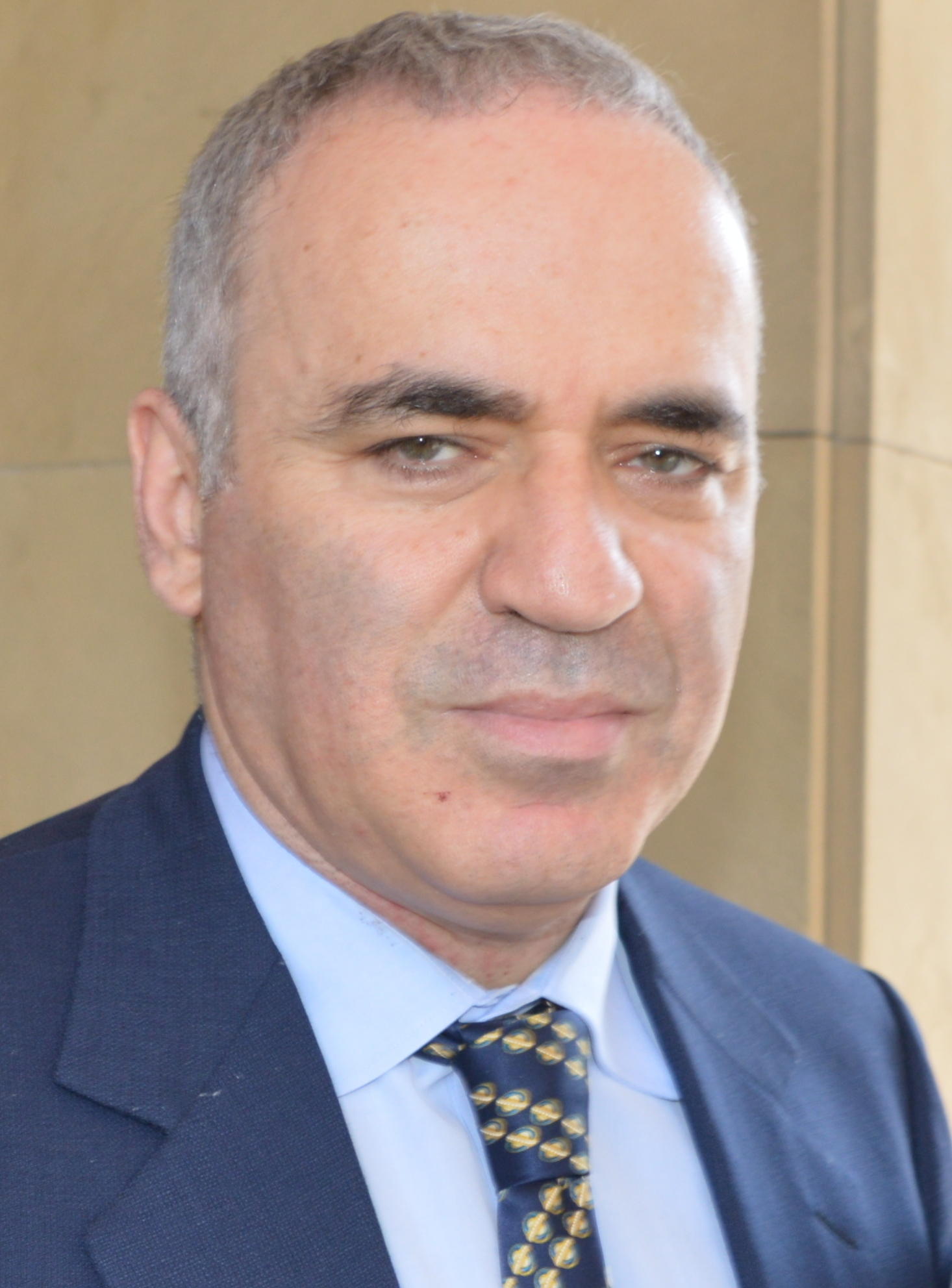
Garry Kasparov was responsible for helping popularize Fomenko's new chronology.

Fomenko's historical ideas have been universally rejected by mainstream scientists, historians, and scholars, who brand them as pseudohistory, pseudoarchaeology, and pseudoscience, but were popularized by former world chess champion Garry Kasparov. Billington writes that the theory "might have quietly blown away in the wind tunnels of academia" if not for Kasparov's writing in support of it in the magazine Ogoniok. Kasparov met Fomenko during the 1990s, and found that Fomenko's conclusions concerning certain subjects were identical to his own regarding the popular view (which is not the view of academics) that art and culture died during the Dark Ages and were not revived until the Renaissance. Kasparov also felt it illogical that the Romans and the Greeks living under the banner of Byzantium could fail to use the mounds of scientific knowledge left to them by Ancient Greece and Rome, especially when it was of urgent military use. Kasparov does not support the reconstruction part of the new chronology.

According to Sheiko, "Fomenko and his allies are unrepentant, noting that the Mongolian, Turkic, and Ukrainian peoples are sadly mistaken in the delusion that they were ever anything other than elements of the Russian Horde", and remarks that for Russian critics, Fomenko represents both an embarrassment and a potent symbol of the depths to which the Russian academy and society have generally sunk amid the diverse societal misfortunes heaped upon Russia since the fall of Communism. Western critics see his views as part of a renewed Russian imperial ideology, "keeping alive an imperial consciousness and secular messianism in Russia".

In 2004 at the Moscow International Book Fair, Anatoly Fomenko with his coauthor Gleb Nosovsky were awarded for their books on "new chronology" the anti-prize called Abzatz (literally 'paragraph', a Russian slang word meaning 'disaster' or 'fiasco') in the category "Pochotnaya bezgramota" (the term is a pun upon "Pochotnaya gramota" (Certificate of Honor) and may be translated as either "Certificate of Dishonor" or literally, "Respectable Illiteracy") for the worst book published in Russia.

Critics have accused Fomenko of altering the data to improve the fit with his ideas and have noted that he violates a key rule of statistics by selecting matches from the historical record which support his chronology, while ignoring those which do not, creating artificial, better-than-chance correlations, and that these practices undermine Fomenko's statistical arguments. The new chronology was given a comprehensive critical analysis in a round table on "The 'Myths' of New Chronology" chaired by the dean of the department of history of Moscow State University in December 1999. One of the participants in that round table, the distinguished Russian archaeologist, Valentin Yanin, compared Fomenko's work to "the sleight of hand trickery of a David Copperfield". Russian linguist Andrey Zaliznyak has extensively criticised Fomenko's arbitrary approach to historical language data and pointed out various linguistic implausibilities arising from his alternative history.

James Billington, formerly professor of Russian history at Harvard and Princeton and the Librarian of Congress from 1987 to 2015 placed Fomenko's work within the context of the political movement of Eurasianism, which sought to tie Russian history closely to that of its Asian neighbors. Billington describes Fomenko as ascribing the belief in past hostility between Russia and the Mongols to the influence of Western historians. Thus, by Fomenko's chronology, "Russia and Turkey are parts of a previously single empire." A French reviewer of Billington's book noted approvingly his concern with the phantasmagorical conceptions of Fomenko about the global "new chronology".

H.G. van Bueren, professor emeritus of astronomy at the University of Utrecht, concluded his scathing review of Fomenko's work on the application of mathematics and astronomy to historical data as follows:

It is surprising, to say the least, that a well-known (Dutch) publisher could produce an expensive book of such doubtful intellectual value, of which the only good word that can be said is that it contains an enormous amount of factual historical material, untidily ordered, true; badly written, yes; mixed-up with conjectural nonsense, sure; but still, much useful stuff. For the rest of the book is absolutely worthless. It reminds one of the early Soviet attempts to produce tendentious science (Lysenko!), of polywater, of cold fusion, and of modern creationism. In brief: a useless and misleading book.

— H.G. van Bueren, "Mathematics and Logic"

In September 2020, major Russian politician and academician of the Russian Academy of Sciences Sergey Glazyev publicly proposed Fomenko's New Chronology as a "reliable support for the formation of modern ideology that consolidates Russian society":

Fomenko's new chronology provides a good logical basis for restoring the historical memory of the Russian world. It fully fits both the scientific approach to the formation of a consolidating ideology, and the construction of the image of the future of Russia in the integral World Economic Order.

— Sergey Glazyev, "Spirituality is an economic category". Voenno-Indushlenny Kurier newspaper issue no. 35, September 15, 2020

=== Convergence of methods in archaeological dating ===
While Fomenko rejects commonly accepted dating methods, most archaeologists, conservators, and other scientists make extensive use of such techniques, which are expected to have been rigorously examined and refined during decades of use.

In the specific case of dendrochronology, Fomenko claims that this fails as an absolute dating method because of gaps in the record. Independent dendrochronological sequences beginning with living trees from various parts of North America and Europe extend back 12,400 years into the past. Furthermore, the mutual consistency of these independent dendrochronological sequences has been confirmed by comparing their radiocarbon and dendrochronological ages. These and other data have provided a calibration curve for radiocarbon dating whose internal error does not exceed ±163 years over the entire 26,000 years of the curve.

In fact, archaeologists have developed a fully anchored dendrochronology series going back past 10,000 BCE. "The absolutely dated tree-ring chronology now extends back to 12,410 cal BP (10,461 BC)."

=== Misuse of historical sources and forced pattern matching ===
Critics of Fomenko's theory claim that his use of historical sources is selective and ignores the basic principles of sound historical scholarship.

Fomenko ... provides no fair-minded review of the historical literature about a topic with which he deals, quotes only those sources that serve his purposes, uses evidence in ways that seem strange to professionally-trained historians and asserts the wildest speculation as if it has the same status as the information common to the conventional historical literature.

They also note that his method of statistically correlating of texts is inexact, as it does not take into account the many possible sources of variation in length outside of "importance". They maintain that differences in language, style, and scope, as well as the frequently differing views and focuses of historians, which are manifested in a different notion of "important events", make quantifying historical writings a dubious proposition at best. Further, Fomenko's critics allege that the parallelisms he reports are often derived by alleged forcing by Fomenko of the data – rearranging, merging, and removing monarchs as needed to fit the pattern.

For example, on the one hand Fomenko asserts that the majority of ancient sources are either irreparably distorted duplicate accounts of the same events or later forgeries. In his identification of Jesus with Pope Gregory VII he ignores the otherwise vast dissimilarities between their reported lives and focuses on the similarity of their appointment to religious office by baptism. (The evangelical Jesus is traditionally believed to have lived for 33 years, and he was an adult at the time of his encounter with John the Baptist. In contrast, according to the available primary sources, Pope Gregory VII lived for at least 60 years and was born 8 years after the death of Fomenko's John-the-Baptist equivalent John II Crescentius.)

Critics allege that many of the supposed correlations of regnal durations are the product of the selective parsing and blending of the dates, events, and individuals mentioned in the original text. Another point raised by critics is that Fomenko does not explain his altering the data (changing the order of rulers, dropping rulers, combining rulers, treating interregna as rulers, switching between theologians and emperors, etc.) preventing a duplication of the effort and effectively making this whole theory an ad hoc hypothesis.

=== References to astronomical phenomena ===
Critics point out that Fomenko's discussion of astronomical phenomena choose isolated examples that support his thesis while ignoring large bodies of data that statistically support evidence for the conventional dating. According to astronomer Yuri N. Efremov, for his dating of the Almagest star catalog Fomenko's selection of just eight stars from the more than 1000 stars in the catalog is arbitrary, and on grounds related to one of them (Arcturus) having a large systematic error, raised the opinion that this star has a dominant effect on Fomenko's dating. Statistical analysis using the same method for all "fast" stars points to the antiquity of the Almagest star catalog. Dennis Rawlins further points out that Fomenko's statistical analysis got the wrong date for the Almagest, because Fomenko considered Earth's obliquity to be a constant when it is actually a variable that changes at a very slow, but known, rate.

Fomenko's studies ignore the abundance of dated astronomical records in cuneiform texts from Mesopotamia. Among these texts is a series of Babylonian astronomical diaries, which records precise astronomical observations of the Moon and planets, often dated in terms of the reigns of known historical figures extending back to the 6th century BCE. Astronomical retrocalculations for all these moving objects allow dating these observations, and consequently the rulers' reigns, to within a single day. The observations are sufficiently redundant that only a small portion of them are sufficient to date a text to a unique year in the period 750 BCE to 100 CE. The dates obtained agree with the accepted chronology. In addition, F. R. Stephenson has demonstrated through a systematic study of a large number of Babylonian, Ancient and Medieval European, and Chinese records of eclipse observations that they can be dated consistently with conventional chronology at least as far back as 600 BCE. In contrast to Fomenko's missing centuries, Stephenson's studies of eclipse observations find an accumulated uncertainty in the timing of the rotation of the earth of 420 seconds at 400 BCE, and only 80 seconds at 1000 CE.

=== Magnitude and consistency of conspiracy theory ===
Fomenko states that world history prior to 1600 was deliberately falsified for political reasons. The consequences of this conspiracy theory are twofold. Documents that conflict with new chronology are said to have been edited or fabricated by conspirators; the Vatican, the Holy Roman Empire and pro-German Romanov dynasty. New chronology taps traditionally Russian anti-Western thoughts and ideas of Germany as a chief enemy. Further, the theory is Russocentric, diminishing achievements of other cultures and claiming major civilization accomplishments as Russian and by proposing a giant "Russian Horde" empire and eliminating historical time before its existence. The theory also claimed to undermine nationalism in countries neighboring Russia by positioning divisions and conflicts as fabricated. Unlike other popular conspiracy theories New Chronology is not intrinsically antisemitic, but it contains claims that may be unwelcome by Jewish communities, like that the Old Testament is newer than the New Testament, placing Jerusalem in Constantinople and projecting stereotypes of Jews by proposing that Jews originate from bankers in the Russian Horde that adopted the religion of Judaism, itself a derivative of Christianity and not the other way round.

The theory provides an alternate history account of the "true" history centered around a world empire called the "Russian Horde". The scope of the new chronology has been compared to J. R. R. Tolkien's fantasy world. Thousands of pages have been written about it and authors address a wide range of objections.

=== Reception in Russia ===
Fomenko has published and sold over one million copies of his books in his native Russia. Internet forums have appeared which aim to supplement his work with additional amateur research. His critics have suggested that Fomenko's version of history appealed to the Russian reading public by keeping alive an imperial consciousness to replace their disillusionment with the failures of Communism and post-Communist corporate oligarchies.

Levashovism has been inspired by this pseudohistory, taking the form of a racial occultist narrative about the Slavic Aryan "Great Tartaria". Another off-shoot on online forums has been the Tartaria conspiracy theory, which draws inspiration from historic architectural photography of demolished buildings as evidence of a long-lost civilization.

== See also ==
- New Chronology (disambiguation)
- New Rome
- Phantom time hypothesis; Heribert Illig's 1991 proposal that 297 years (AD 614–911) were added to chronology in the leadup to AD 1000
- Glasgow Chronology; proposed revision of the chronology of ancient Egypt.
- Ages in Chaos; 1952 book by Immanuel Velikovsky claiming that the histories of Ancient Egypt and Ancient Israel are five centuries out of step.
- Big lie
- Jovan I. Deretić; Deretić is the author of a nationalist pseudohistory of the world with Serbs at the centre.
- Tartarian Empire (conspiracy theory)
- "Western Pseudohistory Theory", A Fomenko-inspired Chinese theory that shares most of Fomenko's claims
