= Pseudohistory =

Pseudoscholarship that attempts to distort historical record

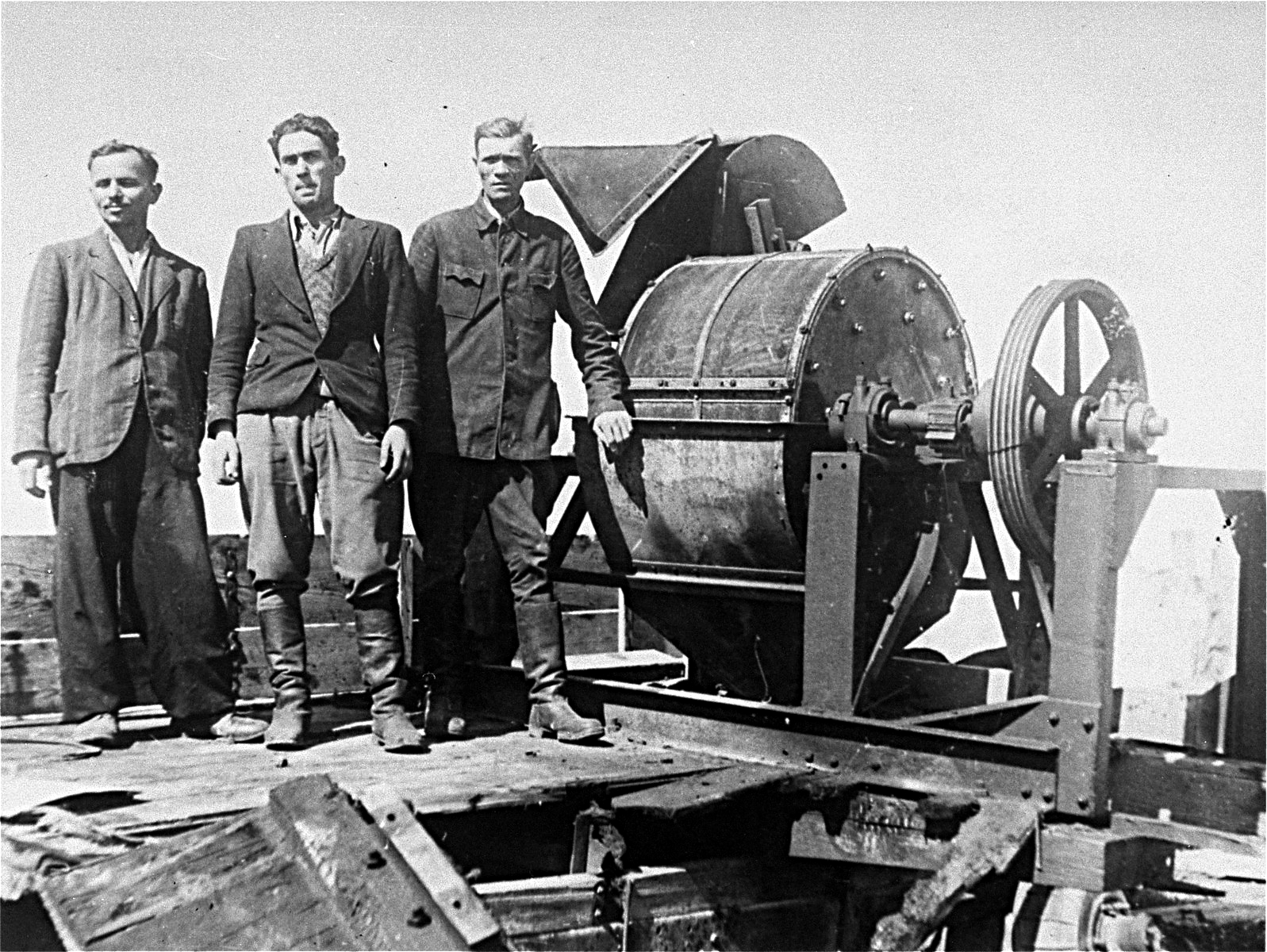
Sonderaktion 1005 was a Nazi project with the explicit goal of hiding or destroying any evidence of the Holocaust committed under Operation Reinhard. This was one of the earliest attempts at Holocaust denial, taking place while the genocide of the Jews was still ongoing. Scholars consider denial to be an integral part of genocide itself.

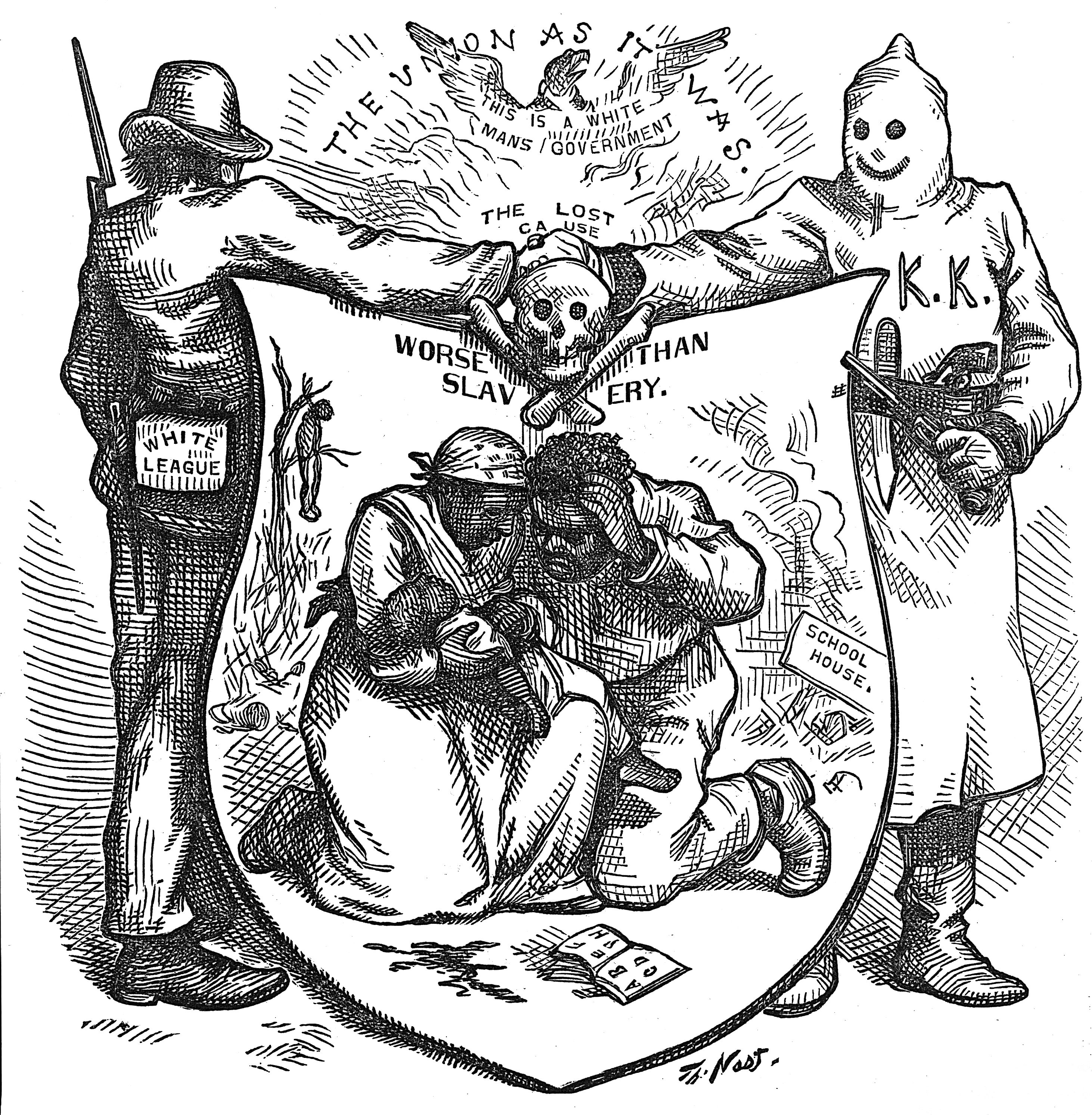
The Lost Cause of the Confederacy is a negationist ideology which falsely claims that the continuation of slavery was not the central cause of the American Civil War.

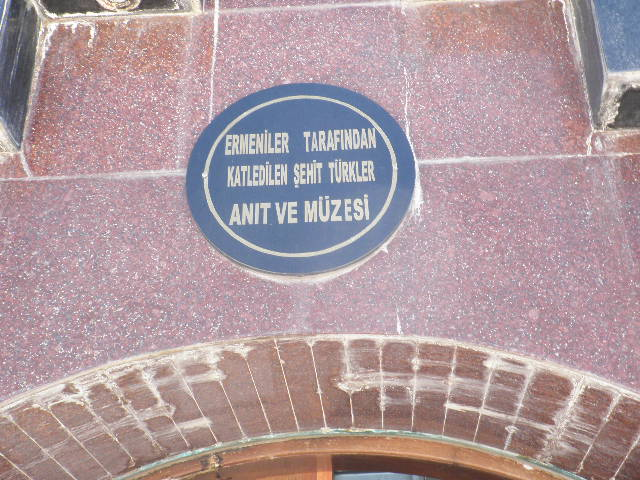
The Iğdır Genocide Memorial and Museum in Turkey promotes the false narrative that Armenians committed genocide against Turks, rather than vice versa.

Pseudohistory is a form of pseudoscholarship that attempts to distort or misrepresent the historical record, often by employing methods resembling those used in scholarly historical research. The related term cryptohistory is applied to pseudohistory derived from the superstitions intrinsic to occultism. Pseudohistory is related to pseudoscience and pseudoarchaeology, and usage of the terms may occasionally overlap.

Although pseudohistory comes in many forms, scholars have identified common features in pseudohistorical works. Pseudohistory is almost always motivated by a contemporary political, religious, or personal agenda. It frequently presents sensational claims or a big lie about historical facts which would require unwarranted revision of the historical record. Another hallmark is an underlying premise that powerful groups have a furtive agenda to suppress the promoter's thesis—a premise commonly corroborated by elaborate conspiracy theories. Works of pseudohistory often point exclusively to unreliable sources—including myths and legends, often treated as literal historical truth—to support the thesis being promoted while ignoring valid sources that contradict it (special pleading). Some works adopt a position of historical relativism, insisting that there is no such thing as historical truth and that any hypothesis is equal to any other. Many works conflate mere possibility with actuality, assuming that if something could have happened, then it did.

Notable examples of pseudohistory include British Israelism, the Lost Cause of the Confederacy, the Irish slaves myth, the witch-cult, Armenian genocide denial, Holocaust denial, Nanking massacre denial, the clean Wehrmacht myth, and the claim that the Katyn massacre was not committed by the Soviet NKVD.

== Definition and etymology ==
The term pseudohistory was coined in the early nineteenth century, which makes the word older than the related terms pseudo-scholarship and pseudoscience. In an attestation from 1815, it is used to refer to the Contest of Homer and Hesiod, a purportedly historical narrative describing an entirely fictional contest between the Greek poets Homer and Hesiod. The pejorative sense of the term, labelling a flawed or disingenuous work of historiography, is found in another 1815 attestation. Pseudohistory is akin to pseudoscience in that both forms of falsification are achieved using the methodology that purports to, but does not, adhere to the established standards of research for the given field of intellectual enquiry of which the pseudoscience claims to be a part, and which offers little or no supporting evidence for its plausibility.

Writers Michael Shermer and Alex Grobman define pseudohistory as "the rewriting of the past for present personal or political purposes". Other writers take a broader definition; Douglas Allchin, a historian of science, contends that when the history of scientific discovery is presented in a simplified way, with drama exaggerated and scientists romanticized, this creates wrong stereotypes about how science works, and in fact constitutes pseudohistory, despite being based on real facts.

== Characteristics ==
Robert Todd Carroll has developed a list of criteria to identify pseudo-historic works. He states that:

Pseudohistory is purported history which:

- Treats myths, legends, sagas and similar literature as literal truth
- Is neither critical nor skeptical in its reading of ancient historians, taking their claims at face value and ignoring empirical or logical evidence contrary to the claims of the ancients
- Is on a mission, not a quest, seeking to support some contemporary political or religious agenda rather than find out the truth about the past
- Often denies that there is such a thing as historical truth, clinging to the extreme skeptical notion that only what is absolutely certain can be called 'true' and nothing is absolutely certain, so nothing is true
- Often maintains that history is nothing but mythmaking and that different histories are not to be compared on such traditional academic standards as accuracy, empirical probability, logical consistency, relevancy, completeness, fairness or honesty, but on moral or political grounds
- Is selective in its use of ancient documents, citing favorably those that fit with its agenda, and ignoring or interpreting away those documents which do not fit
- Considers the possibility of something being true as sufficient to believe it is true if it fits with one's agenda
- Often maintains that there is a conspiracy to suppress its claims because of racism, atheism or ethnocentrism, or because of opposition to its political or religious agenda

Nicholas Goodrick-Clarke prefers the term "cryptohistory". He identifies two necessary elements as "a complete ignorance of the primary sources" and the repetition of "inaccuracies and wild claims".

Other common characteristics of pseudohistory are:

- The arbitrary linking of disparate events so as to form – in the theorist's opinion – a pattern. This is typically then developed into a conspiracy theory postulating a hidden agent responsible for creating and maintaining the pattern. For example, the pseudohistorical The Holy Blood and the Holy Grail links the Knights Templar, the medieval Grail Romances, the Merovingian Frankish dynasty and the artist Nicolas Poussin in an attempt to identify lineal descendants of Jesus.
- Hypothesising the consequences of unlikely events that "could" have happened, thereby assuming tacitly that they did.
- Sensationalism, or shock value
- Cherry picking, or "law office history", evidence that helps the historical argument being made and suppressing evidence that hurts it.

== Categories and examples ==
The following are some common categories of pseudohistorical theory, with examples. Not all theories in a listed category are necessarily pseudohistorical; they are rather categories that seem to attract pseudohistorians.

=== Main categories ===
==== Alternative chronologies ====
An alternative chronology is a revised sequence of events that deviates from the standard timeline of world history accepted by mainstream scholars. An example of an "alternative chronology" is Anatoly Fomenko's New Chronology, which claims that recorded history actually began around AD 800 and all events that allegedly occurred prior to that point either never really happened at all or are simply inaccurate retellings of events that happened later. One of its outgrowths is the Tartary conspiracy theory. Other, less extreme examples, are the phantom time hypothesis, which asserts that the years AD 614–911 never took place; and the New Chronology of David Rohl, which claims that the accepted timelines for ancient Egyptian and Israelite history are wrong.

==== Historical falsification ====
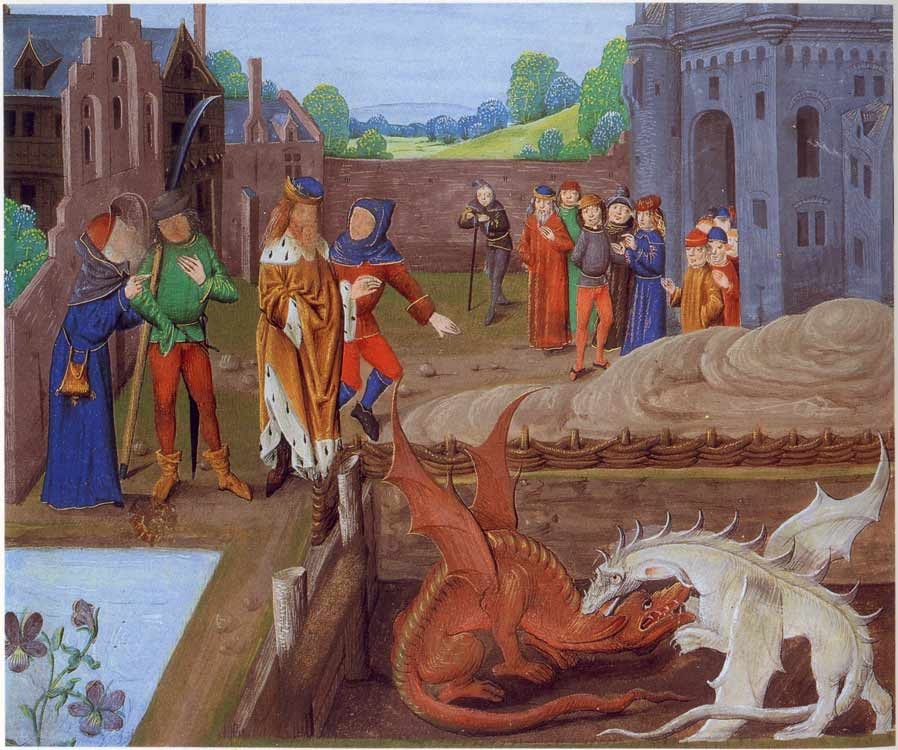
Geoffrey of Monmouth's History of the Kings of Britain, a scene from which is shown in this fifteenth-century illumination, was a popular work of pseudohistory during the Middle Ages.

In the eighth century, a forged document known as Donation of Constantine, which supposedly transferred authority over Rome and the western part of the Roman Empire to the Pope, became widely circulated. In the twelfth century, Geoffrey of Monmouth published the History of the Kings of Britain, a pseudohistorical work purporting to describe the ancient history and origins of the British people. The book synthesises earlier Celtic mythical traditions to inflate the deeds of the mythical King Arthur. The contemporary historian William of Newburgh wrote around 1190 that "it is quite clear that everything this man wrote about Arthur and his successors, or indeed about his predecessors from Vortigern onwards, was made up, partly by himself and partly by others".

==== Historical revisionism ====
The Shakespeare authorship question is a fringe theory that claims that the works attributed to William Shakespeare were actually written by someone other than William Shakespeare of Stratford-upon-Avon.

Another example of historical revisionism is the thesis, found in the writings of David Barton and others, asserting that the United States was founded as an exclusively Christian nation. Mainstream historians instead support the traditional position, which holds that the American founding fathers intended for church and state to be kept separate.

Confederate revisionists (a.k.a. Civil War revisionists), "Lost Cause" advocates, and Neo-Confederates argue that the Confederate States of America's prime motivation was the maintenance of states' rights and limited government, rather than the preservation and expansion of slavery.

Connected to the Lost Cause is the Irish slaves myth, a pseudo-historical narrative which conflates the experiences of Irish indentured servants and enslaved Africans in the Americas. This myth, which was historically promoted by Irish nationalists such as John Mitchel, has in the modern-day been supported by white supremacists in the United States to minimize the mistreatment experienced by African Americans (such as racism and segregation) and oppose demands for slavery reparations. The myth has also been used to obscure and downplay Irish involvement in the transatlantic slave trade.

==== Historical negationism ====
While closely related to previous categories, historical negationism, or denialism, specifically aims to outright deny the existence of confirmed events, often including various massacres, genocides, and national histories.

Some examples include Holocaust denial, Armenian genocide denial, as well as Nanjing Massacre denial and Nakba denial in the 1984 work From Time Immemorial by Joan Peters.

==== Psychohistory ====
Some mainstream historians have categorized psychohistory as pseudohistory. Psychohistory is an amalgam of psychology, history, and related social sciences and the humanities. Its stated goal is to examine the "why" of history, especially the difference between stated intention and actual behavior. It also states as its goal the combination of the insights of psychology, especially psychoanalysis, with the research methodology of the social sciences and humanities to understand the emotional origin of the behavior of individuals, groups and nations, past and present.

==== Pseudoarchaeology ====
Pseudoarchaeology refers to a false interpretation of records, namely physical ones, often by unqualified or otherwise amateur archeologists. These interpretations are often baseless and seldom align with established consensus. Nazi archaeology is a prominent example of this technique. Frequently, people who engage in pseudoarchaeology have a very strict interpretation of evidence and are unwilling to alter their stance, resulting in interpretations that often appear overly simplistic and fail to capture the complexity and nuance of the complete narrative.

=== Various examples of pseudohistory ===
(These following examples can belong to a variety of the above mentioned categories, or ones not mentioned as well).

==== Ancient aliens, ancient technologies, and lost lands ====
Immanuel Velikovsky's books Worlds in Collision (1950), Ages in Chaos (1952), and Earth in Upheaval (1955), which became "instant bestsellers", demonstrated that pseudohistory based on ancient mythology held potential for tremendous financial success and became models of success for future works in the genre.

In 1968, Erich von Däniken published Chariots of the Gods?, which claims that ancient visitors from outer space constructed the pyramids and other monuments. He later published other books in which he made similar claims. These claims have all been categorized as pseudohistory. Similarly, Zechariah Sitchin has published numerous books claiming that a race of extraterrestrial beings from the Planet Nibiru known as the Anunnaki visited Earth in ancient times in search of gold, and that they genetically engineered humans to serve as their slaves. He claims that memories of these occurrences are recorded in Sumerian mythology, as well as other mythologies all across the globe. These speculations have likewise been categorized as pseudohistory.

The ancient astronaut hypothesis was further popularized in the United States by the History Channel television series Ancient Aliens. History professor Ronald H. Fritze observed that the pseudohistorical claims promoted by von Däniken and the Ancient Aliens program have a periodic popularity in the US: "In a pop culture with a short memory and a voracious appetite, aliens and pyramids and lost civilizations are recycled like fashions."

The author Graham Hancock has sold over four million copies of books promoting the pseudohistorical thesis that all the major monuments of the ancient world, including Stonehenge, the Egyptian pyramids, and the moai of Easter Island, were built by a single ancient supercivilization, which Hancock claims thrived from 15,000 to 10,000 BC and possessed technological and scientific knowledge equal to or surpassing that of modern civilization. He first advanced the full form of this argument in his 1995 bestseller Fingerprints of the Gods, which won popular acclaim, but scholarly disdain. Christopher Knight has published numerous books, including Uriel's Machine (2000), expounding pseudohistorical assertions that ancient civilizations possessed technology far more advanced than the technology of today.

The claim that a lost continent known as Lemuria once existed in the Indian Ocean has likewise been categorized as pseudohistory.

Furthermore, similar conspiracy theories promote the idea of embellished, fabricated accounts of historical civilizations, namely Khazaria and Tartaria.

==== Antisemitic pseudohistory ====
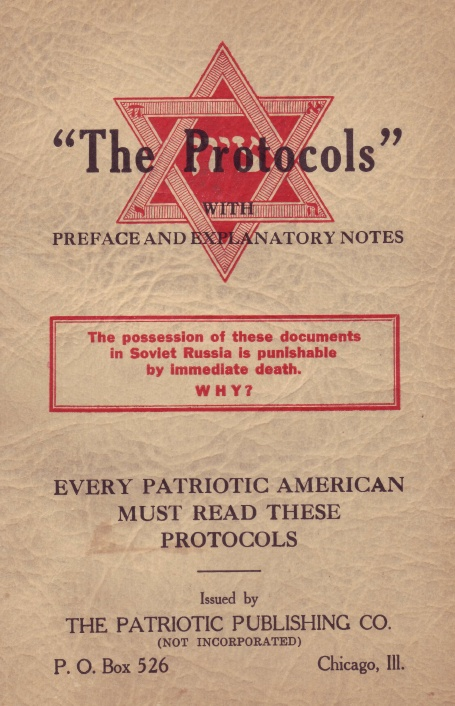
American edition of The Protocols of the Elders of Zion from 1934

The Protocols of the Learned Elders of Zion is a fraudulent work purporting to show a historical conspiracy for world domination by Jews. The work was conclusively proven to be a forgery in August 1921, when The Times revealed that extensive portions of the document were directly plagiarized from Maurice Joly's 1864 satirical dialogue The Dialogue in Hell Between Machiavelli and Montesquieu, as well as Hermann Goedsche's 1868 antisemitic novel Biarritz.

The Khazar theory is an academic fringe theory that postulates the belief that the bulk of European Jewry is of Central Asian (Turkic) origin. In spite of the mainstream academic consensus which conclusively rejects it, this theory has been promoted in Anti-Semitic and some Anti-Zionist circles, they argue that Jews are an alien element in both Europe and Palestine.

Holocaust denial in particular and genocide denial in general are widely categorized as pseudohistory. Major proponents of genocide denial include David Irving and others, who argue that events such as the Holocaust, the Holodomor, the Armenian genocide, the Assyrian genocide, the Greek genocide or other genocides did not occur, or that accounts of them were greatly exaggerated.

==== Ethnocentric or nationalist revisionism ====
Most Afrocentric (i.e. Pre-Columbian Africa-Americas contact theories, see Ancient Egyptian race controversy) ideas have been identified as pseudohistorical, alongside the "Indigenous Aryans" theories published by Hindu nationalists during the 1990s and 2000s. The "crypto-history" developed within Germanic mysticism and Nazi occultism has likewise been placed under this categorization.

The Sun Language Theory is a pseudohistorical ideology which argues that all languages are descended from a form of proto-Turkish. The theory may have been partially devised in order to legitimize Arabic and Semitic loanwords occurring in the Turkish language by instead asserting that the Arabic and Semitic words were derived from the Turkish ones rather than vice versa.

A large number of nationalist pseudohistorical theories deal with the legendary Ten Lost Tribes of ancient Israel. British-Israelism, also known as Anglo-Israelism, the most famous example of this type, has been conclusively refuted by mainstream historians using evidence from a vast array of different fields of study.

Antiquization or Ancient Macedonism is a nationalistic pseudohistorical theory which postulates direct demographic, cultural and linguistic continuity between ancient Macedonians and the main ethnic group in present-day North Macedonia. North Macedonian scholars say the theory is intended to forge a national identity distinct from modern Bulgaria. The Bulgarian medieval dynasty of the Komitopules is presented as ruling a "medieval Macedonian state" because its capitals were located in what was previously the ancient kingdom of Macedonia, and North Macedonian historians often replace the ethnonym "Bulgarians" with "Macedonians", or avoid it. The theory is controversial in Greece and sparked mass protests there in 2018. A particular item of dispute is North Macedonian veneration of Alexander the Great; mainstream scholarship holds that Alexander had Greek ancestry, he was born in an area of ancient Macedonia that is now Greece, and he ruled over North Macedonia but never lived there. To placate Greece and thereby facilitate Macedonian entry into the European Union and NATO, the Macedonian government formally renounced claims of ancient Macedonian heritage with the 2018 Prespa Agreement.

Dacianism is a Romanian pseudohistorical current that attempts to attribute far more influence over European and world history to the Dacians than that which they actually enjoyed. Dacianist historiography claims that the Dacians held primacy over all other civilizations, including the Romans; that the Dacian language was the origin of Latin and all other languages, such as Hindi and Babylonian; and sometimes that the Zalmoxis cult has structural links to Christianity. Dacianism was most prevalent in National Communist Romania, as the Ceaușescu regime portrayed the Dacians as insurgents defying an "imperialist" Rome; the Communist Party had formally attached "protochronism", as Dacianism was known, to Marxist ideology by 1974.

==== Matriarchy ====
The official consensus among academics is that no unambiguously and strictly matriarchal society is yet known to have existed, though that depends on the definition used. Many societies are known, however, to have or have had some matriarchal features, in particular matrilineality, matrilocality, and/or matrifocality. Anthropologist Donald Brown's list of human cultural universals (viz., features shared by nearly all current human societies) includes men being the "dominant element" in public political affairs, which is the contemporary opinion of mainstream anthropology. Some societies that are matrilineal or matrifocal may in fact have patriarchal power structures, and thus be misidentified as matriarchal. The idea that matriarchal societies existed and they preceded patriarchal societies was first raised in the 19th-century among Western academics, but it has since been discredited.

Despite this however, some second-wave feminists (and beyond) assert that a matriarchy preceded the patriarchy. The Goddess Movement and Riane Eisler's 1987 book The Chalice and the Blade cite Venus figurines as evidence that societies of Paleolithic and Neolithic Europe were matriarchies that worshipped a goddess. This belief is not currently supported by most mainstream academics.

==== Pre-Columbian trans-oceanic contact theories ====
Excluding the Norse colonization of the Americas and some limited Polynesian contact with South America, most theories of pre-Columbian trans-oceanic contact have been classified as pseudohistory, including claims that the Americas were actually discovered by Arabs or Muslims. Gavin Menzies' book 1421: The Year China Discovered the World, which argues for the idea that Chinese sailors discovered America, has also been categorized as a work of pseudohistory.

==== Racist pseudohistory ====
Josiah Priest and other nineteenth-century American writers wrote pseudohistorical narratives that portrayed African Americans and Native Americans in an extremely negative light. Priest's first book was The Wonders of Nature and Providence, Displayed (1826). The book is regarded by modern critics as one of the earliest works of modern American pseudohistory. Priest attacked Native Americans in American Antiquities and Discoveries of the West (1833) and African-Americans in Slavery, As It Relates to the Negro (1843). Other nineteenth-century writers, such as Thomas Gold Appleton, in his A Sheaf of Papers (1875), and George Perkins Marsh, in his The Goths in New England, seized upon false notions of Viking history to promote the superiority of white people (as well as to oppose the Catholic Church). Such misuse of Viking history and imagery reemerged in the twentieth century among some groups promoting white supremacy.

==== Stalinist pseudohistory ====
League of Struggle for the Emancipation of the Working Class, 1897, shortly before the arrest by the Russian secret service. Lenin is sitting in the center. After Aleksandr Malchenko fell out of favor with Stalin in 1930, he was removed from the picture.

Supporters of Stalinist pseudohistory claim, among other things, that Joseph Stalin and other top Soviet leaders did not realize the scope of mass killings perpetrated under the Stalin regime, that executions of prisoners were legally justifiable, and that prisoners in Soviet gulags performed important construction work that helped the Soviet Union economically, particularly during World War II. Scholars point to overwhelming evidence that Stalin directly helped plan mass killings, that many prisoners were sent to gulags or executed extrajudicially, and that many prisoners did no productive work, often being isolated in remote camps or given pointless and menial tasks.

==== Anti-religious pseudohistory ====
The Christ myth theory claims that Jesus of Nazareth never existed as a historical figure and was imagined by early Christians or arose from earlier beliefs such as star worship. This argument currently finds very little support among scholars and historians of all faiths and has been described as pseudohistorical.

Likewise, some minority historian views assert that Muhammad either did not exist or was not central to founding Islam.

==== Religious pseudohistory ====
The Holy Blood and the Holy Grail (1982) by Michael Baigent, Richard Leigh, and Henry Lincoln is a book that purports to show that certain historical figures, such as Godfrey of Bouillon, and contemporary aristocrats are the lineal descendants of Jesus. Mainstream historians have widely panned the book, categorizing it as pseudohistory, and pointing out that the genealogical tables used in it are now known to be spurious. Nonetheless, the book was an international best-seller and inspired Dan Brown's bestselling mystery thriller novel The Da Vinci Code.

Although historians and archaeologists consider the Book of Mormon to be an anachronistic invention of Joseph Smith, many members of The Church of Jesus Christ of Latter-day Saints believe that it describes ancient historical events in the Americas.

Searches for Noah's Ark have also been categorized as pseudohistory.

In her books, starting with The Witch-Cult in Western Europe (1921), English author Margaret Murray claimed that the witch trials in the early modern period were actually an attempt by chauvinistic Christians to annihilate a secret, pagan religion, which she claimed worshipped a Horned God. Murray's claims have now been widely rejected by respected historians. Nonetheless, her ideas have become the foundation myth for modern Wicca, a contemporary Neopagan religion. Belief in Murray's alleged witch-cult is still prevalent among Wiccans, but is gradually declining.

The belief that ancient India was technologically advanced to the extent of being a nuclear power has been popularized by Hindu nationalists on the premise that "fantastical" scientific and medical achievements described in Hindu mythology are historically accurate. In 2014, Prime Minister Narendra Modi told doctors and medical staff at a Mumbai hospital that the story of the Hindu god Ganesha—described as having the head of an elephant and the body of a human—shows genetic science and cosmetic surgery existed in ancient India. Another example was the 2015 Indian Science Congress ancient aircraft controversy, when Capt. Anand J. Bodas, retired principal of a pilot training facility, claimed at the Indian Science Congress that mythical aircraft more advanced than today's aircraft flew in ancient India. Nationalists have proposed that these aircraft and other ancient mythical technology should be presented as authentic in school textbooks. Aniket Sule, an astrophysicist at the Homi Bhabha Center for Science Education, said that "people close to the current [Modi] government... feel that the present curriculum for science and history is too Western-centric" and that they may "brainwash a generation" of Indian scholars with such claims.

Baptist successionism posits that the Baptist church did not originate with 17th-century Puritan English Dissenters, and that it instead represents an unbroken church lineage reaching back to John the Baptist and the Book of Acts via a familial relationship between historic Christian churches with beliefs similar to modern Baptists. Historians point to a lack of evidence linking the disparate sects that comprise the lineage and note that some of them held beliefs antithetical to Baptist doctrine. Historian H. Leon McBeth wrote that "This view is based on inadequate sources, was more polemic than historical, and made large assumptions where evidence was lacking." Successionism implies that the Baptist church predates the Catholic Church, calling into question whether Baptists are indeed Protestants and downplaying the influence of the Reformation, contrary to evidence that the 17th-century founders of the Baptist movement viewed themselves as participants in the Reformation. Some successionists claim that persecution by the Catholic Church explains the lack of evidence for the successionist lineage.

In South Asia, pseudohistorical narratives are sometimes used to relocate or reinterpret religious history in order to support religious identity claims.

== As a topic of study ==
Courses critiquing pseudohistory are offered as undergraduate courses in liberal arts settings, one example being in Claremont McKenna College.

== See also ==
- Big lie – Propaganda technique
- Disinformation
- Found manuscript
- Pseudoscientific metrology
- List of pseudohistorians
