= New Chronology =

New Chronology may refer to:

- New Chronology (Fomenko), a proposition by Anatoly Fomenko that world history started roughly around AD 1000
- New Chronology (Glasgow) or The Glasgow Chronology, a proposed revision of the chronology of ancient Egypt
- New Chronology (Rohl), an alternative chronology of the ancient Near East developed by English Egyptologist David Rohl and other researchers
