= Tartarian Empire =

Alleged lost empire

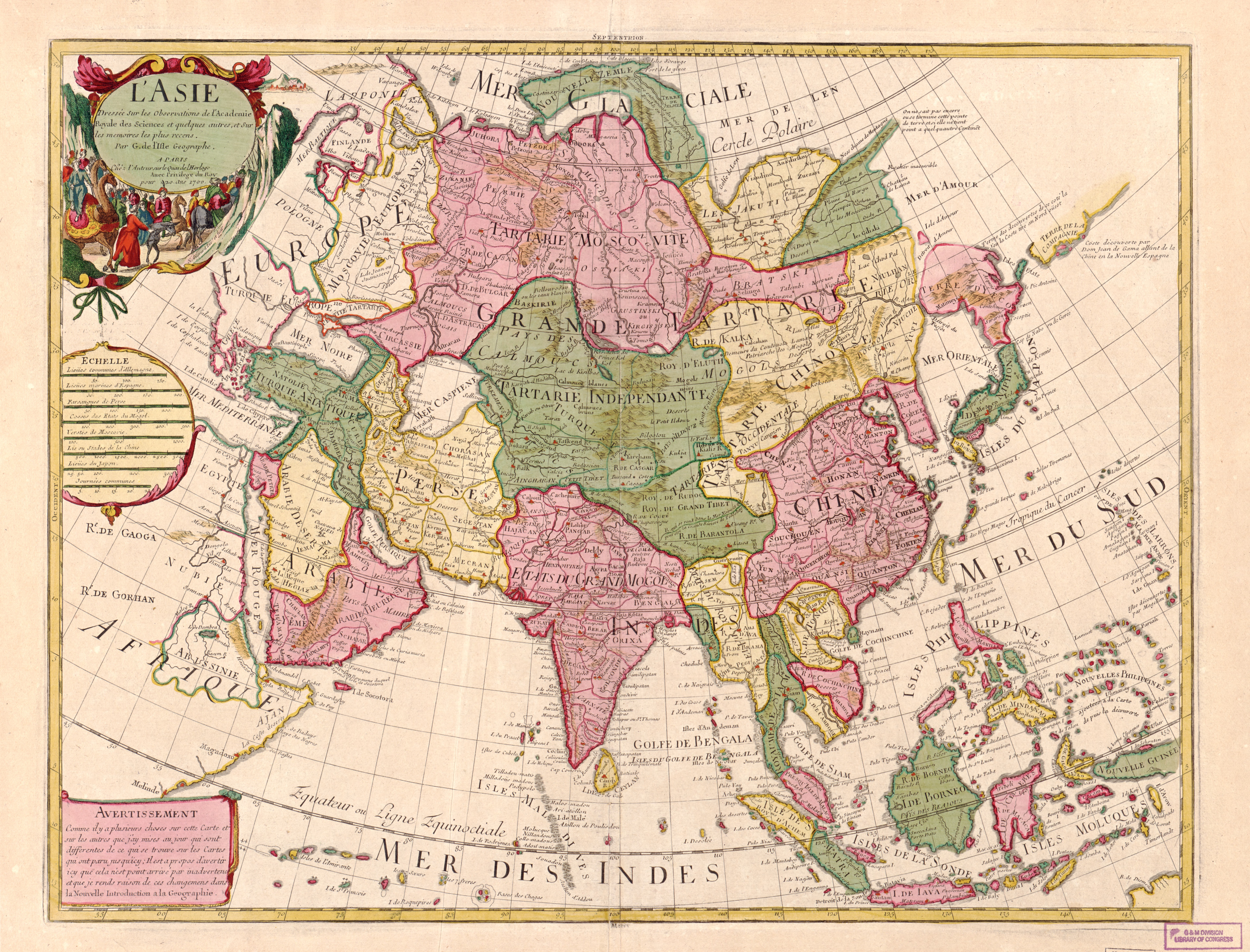
A 1700 map of Asia dividing "Great Tartary" into "Muscovite Tartary", "Chinese Tartary", and "Independent Tartary"

The Tartarian Empire or Great Tartaria is a group of pseudohistorical conspiracy theories, including ideas of a "hidden past" and "mud floods", which originated as pseudoscientific Russian nationalism.

Tartary, or Tartaria, is a historical name for Central Asia and Siberia. Conspiracy theories assert that Tartary, or the Tartarian Empire, was a lost civilization with advanced technology and culture. This ignores well-documented accounts of Tartary within the history of Asia. In modern conceptions of the conspiracy theories, Tartary has been claimed to cover a region spanning central Afghanistan to northern Kazakhstan as well as areas in Mongolia, China, and the Russian Far East.

== Background ==
The theory of Great Tartaria as a suppressed lost land or civilization originated in Russia, with aspects first appearing in Anatoly Fomenko's new chronology in the mid-1970s and early 1980s, and was then popularized by the racial occult history of Nikolai Levashov. In Russian pseudoscience, known for its nationalism, Tartaria is presented as the "real" name for Russia, which was maliciously "ignored" in the West. The Russian Geographical Society has debunked the conspiracy theory as an extremist fantasy, and far from denying the existence of the term, has used the opportunity to share numerous maps of "Tartary" in its collection. Since about 2016, conspiracy theories about the supposed lost empire of "Tartaria" have gained popularity on the internet, divorced from its original Russian nationalist frame.

== Conspiracy theory ==
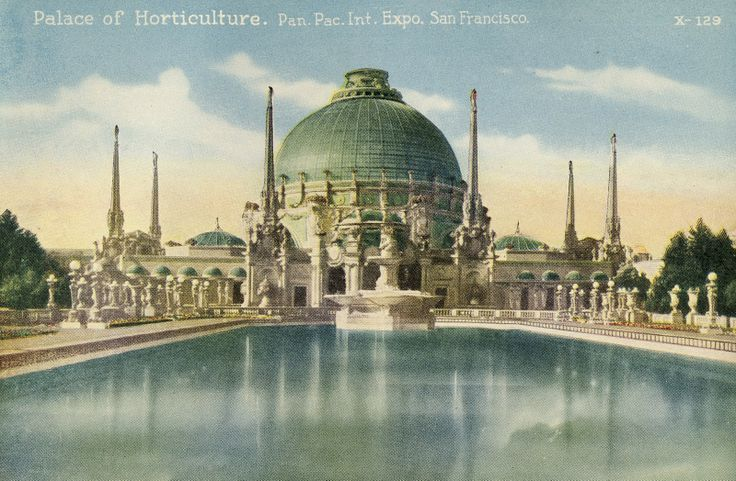
The Palace of Horticulture built for the Panama–Pacific International Exposition in San Francisco in 1915

The globalized version of the conspiracy theory is based on an alternative view of architectural history. Adherents propose that demolished buildings such as the Singer Building, the original New York Penn Station, and the temporary grounds of the 1915 World's Fair in San Francisco were actually the buildings of a vast empire based in Tartary that has been suppressed from history. Sumptuously styled Gilded Age buildings are often held out as really having been built by the supposed Tartaria. Other buildings, such as the Great Pyramids and the White House, are further held out as Tartarian constructions. The conspiracy theory only vaguely describes how such a supposedly advanced civilization, which had reputedly achieved world peace, could have fallen and been hidden. Proponents of the theory also frequently claim that Tartarians have developed unlimited wireless energy.

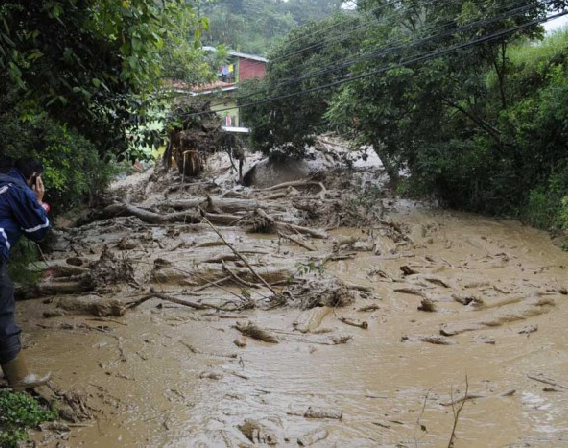
The destruction of the Tartarian Empire is typically attributed to a colossal "mud flood".

In the conspiracy theory, the idea that a "mud flood" wiped out much of the world via depopulation and thus old buildings is common, supported by the fact that many buildings across the world have architectural elements like doors, windows, and archways submerged many feet below "ground level". Both World War I and II are cited as a way in which Tartaria was destroyed and hidden, reflecting the reality that the extensive bombing campaigns of World War II did destroy many historic buildings. It has also been claimed that the Bolshevik revolution and the subsequent spread of Communism in Europe were a secret operation to erase any evidence of the Tartarian Empire. The general evidence for the theory is that there are similar styles of building around the world, such as capitol buildings with domes, or star forts. Also, many photographs from the turn of the 20th century appear to show deserted city streets in many capital cities across the world. When people do appear in the photographs, there is a striking contrast between horse-and-cart users in muddy streets and the elaborate, highly ornate stone mega-structures that tower above city inhabitants, a contrast still seen in modern cities where extreme poverty is juxtaposed with skyscrapers.

The architectural critic Zach Mortice, writing for Bloomberg, believes the theory reflects cultural discontent with modernism and the supposition that traditional styles are inherently good and modern styles are bad. He describes the theory as "the QAnon of architecture". Moritz Maurer, a religious scholar, links Tartarian imagery to the "giant trees" theory, in which colossal, flat buttes are envisioned as the stumps of primordial "mother trees" cut down at some point in the past by unknown nefarious agents. Maurer attributes the lack of a clear narrative for both conspiracies to the image-based social media on which they are presented, describing it as "meme culture" and also comparing it to QAnon.

== See also ==
- New chronology (Fomenko)
- Ancient astronauts
- Anti-Normanism
- Chinese Tartary, an archaic geographical term
- Hyperborea, in Greek mythology, a mythical people in the far north of the world
- Great Lechia, a Polish conspiracy theory compared to the Tartarian Empire
- Western Pseudohistory Theory

== Sources ==
- Gorshenina, Svetlana (2014). L'invention de l'Asie centrale : histoire du concept de la Tartarie à l'Eurasie. Droz. ISBN 978-2600017886. ISSN 2235-1353.
- Gorshenina, Svetlana (2019). Izobreteniye kontsepta Sredney / Tsentral'noy Azii: mezhdu naukoy i geopolitikoy Изобретение концепта Средней / Центральной Азии: между наукой и геополитикой [The invention of the concept of Middle / Central Asia: between science and geopolitics] (PDF) (in Russian). George Washington University. ISBN 978-0-9996214-4-8.
