= Vohenstrauß =

Town in Bavaria, Germany

- Town
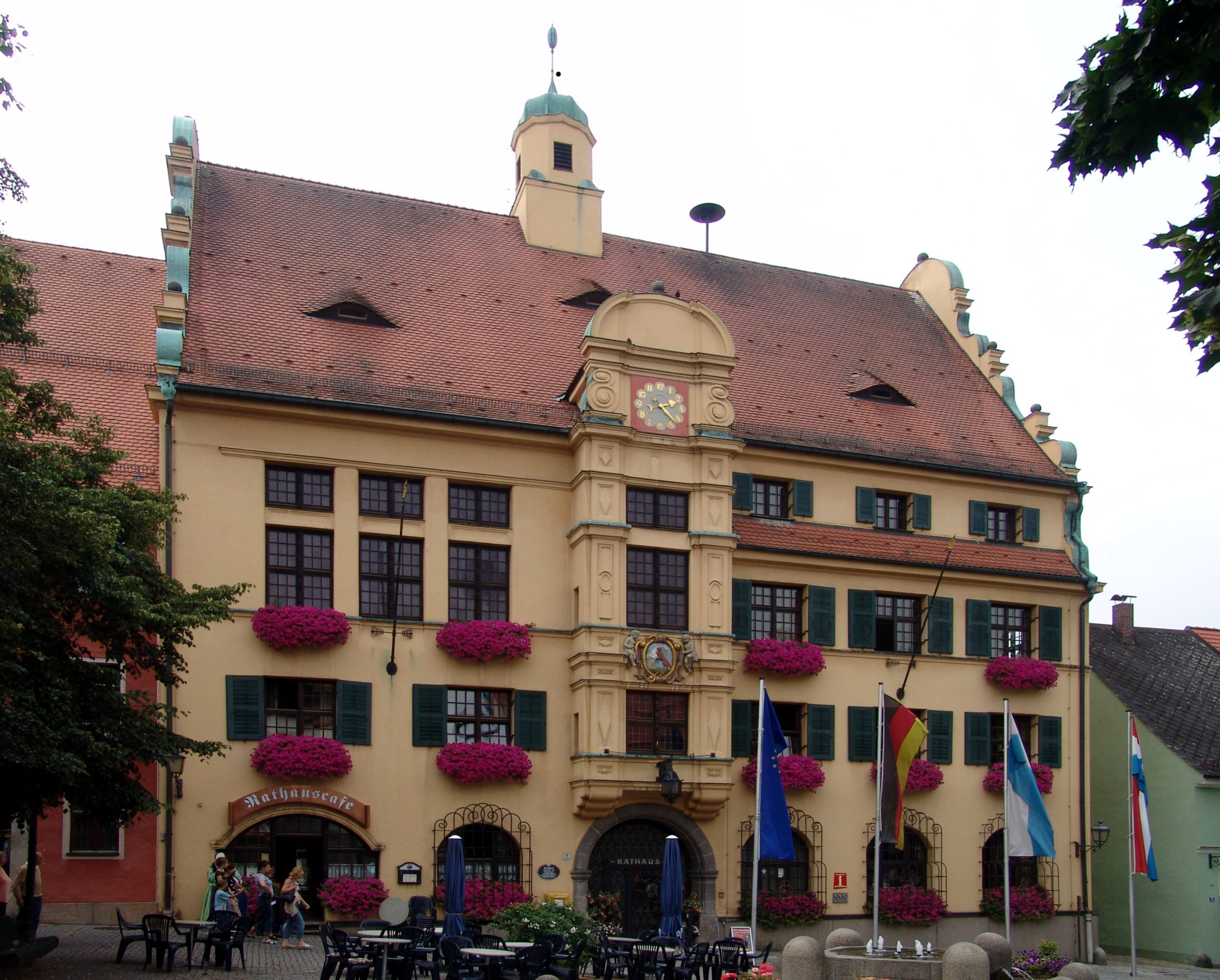
- Town hall

- Coat of arms

- Location of Vohenstrauß within Neustadt a.d.Waldnaab district
- Interactive map of Vohenstrauß
- Location within Germany Location within Bavaria
- Coordinates: 49°37′N 12°20′E
- Country: Germany
- State: Bavaria
- Admin. region: Oberpfalz
- District: Neustadt a.d.Waldnaab

Government
  - Mayor (2020–26): Andreas Wutzlhofer (CSU)

Area
  - Total: 74.91 km^{2} (28.92 sq mi)
- Elevation: 450–650 m (1,480–2,130 ft)

Population (2025-12-31)
  - Total: 7,559
  - Density: 100.9/km^{2} (261.3/sq mi)
- Time zone: UTC+01:00 (CET)
  - Summer (DST): UTC+02:00 (CEST)
- Postal codes: 92648
- Dialling codes: 09651
- Vehicle registration: NEW, ESB, VOH
- Website: www.vohenstrauss.de

Vohenstrauß (or Vohenstrauss; German: [ˈfoːənˌʃtʁaʊs]) is a town in Germany, located in the north-eastern part of the Bavarian region Upper Palatinate. The town is situated in the district of Neustadt an der Waldnaab. It is the birthplace of Heribert Illig.

== Districts ==
Altenstadt bei Vohenstrauß, Böhmischbruck, Oberlind, Kaimling, Roggenstein, Waldau

== Mayors ==
- 1945: F. X. Wittmann
- 1945–1948: Karl Ries
- 1948–1952: Erhard Wagner
- 1952–1966: Hans Fuchs
- 1966–1972: Otto Ries
- 1972–1984: Max Steger
- 1984–1986: Ernst Eichl
- 1986–1994: Franz Pausch (temporary because E. Eichl was ill, elected in 1988)
- 1994–2008: Josef Zilbauer
- since May 2008: Andreas Wutzlhofer

== Sport ==
The towns association football club, SpVgg Vohenstrauß, experienced its greatests success between 1969 and 1974 when it played for five seasons in the third division Bayernliga.

== Sons and daughters of the town ==
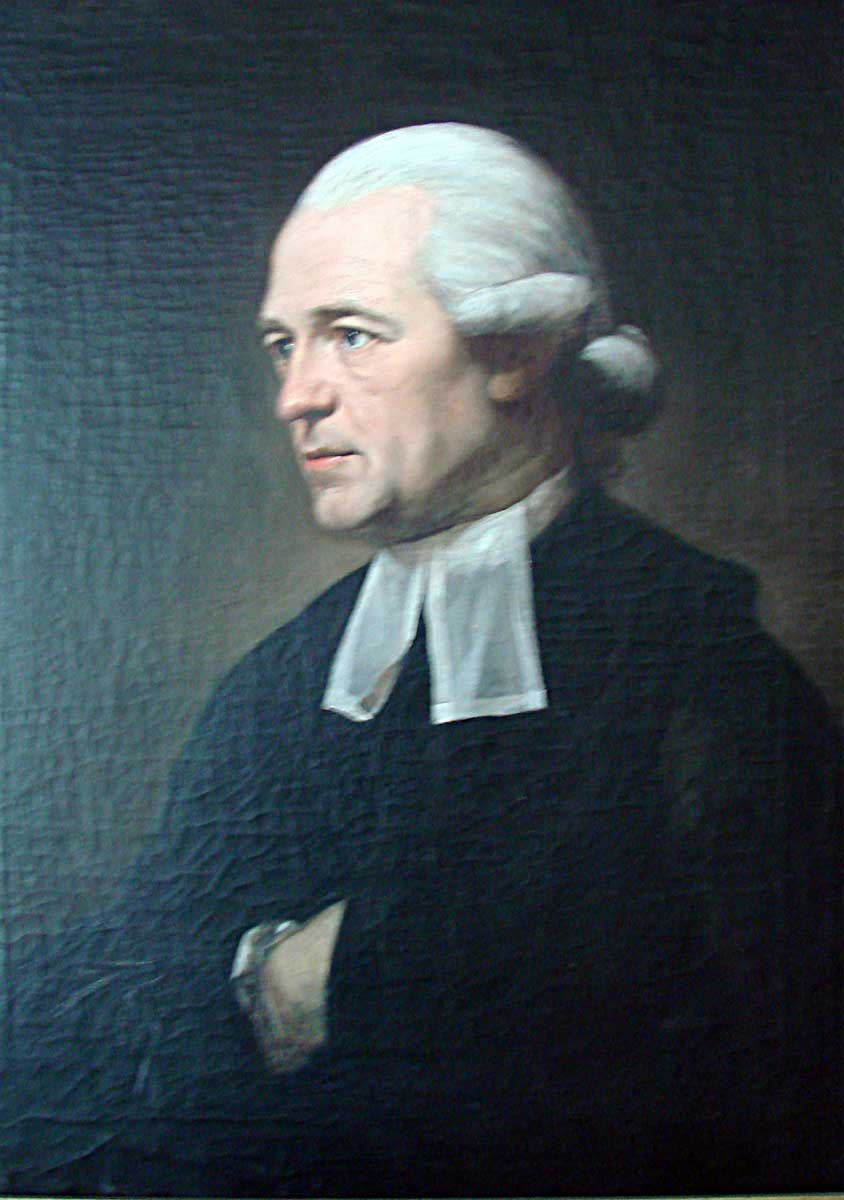
Franz Volkmar Reinhard around 1790

- Franz Volkmar Reinhard (1753–1812), Protestant theologian, in 1792 he was appointed Oberhofprediger (first preacher) to the Saxon court in Dresden
- Heribert Illig (born 1947), German publicist and publisher
