= Du Gangjian =

Chinese legal scholar

Du Gangjian (Chinese: 杜钢建; pinyin: Dù Gāngjiàn; born August 1956) is a Chinese legal scholar and a representative figure of New Confucianism in mainland China.

== Education and career ==
Du Gangjian was born in Hefei, Anhui in 1956. He received a Bachelor's degree in foreign languages from Anhui Normal University in 1979 and a Master of Laws degree from Renmin University of China Department of Law in 1982.

After graduation, Du joined the faculty of Renmin University of China Department of Law. He was a professor at National School of Administration from 1997 to 2004. He became the Chief Professor (首席教授) of Shantou University Law School in 2004 and was appointed the Dean of Shantou University Law School in March 2007. He left Shantou University and joined the faculty of Hunan University Law School in 2009, and was the dean of the school from 2010 to 2015.

Du was selected as one of 2003 Top Ten Opinion Leaders by Caijing Shibao (财经时报), a Chinese newspaper, and one of 100 jurists who influenced the process of promoting rule of law in China by China Today in 2017.

Du is the founder of World Civilization Research Association.

== Thoughts and research ==
As an advocate of New Confucianism and Confucian constitutionalism, Du is known for his idea that Confucianism can be used as the ideological basis for constitutionalism and human rights.

Some of his research, e.g., claiming that American Indians may descend from Hunan, that some ancestors of Korean and Japanese people came from Hunan, and that Western civilization originated in China, have attracted public attention.

== Selected publications ==
- Thoughts on Human Rights in Twentieth-century China (中國近百年人權思想), The Chinese University of Hong Kong Press, 2004, ISBN 9789622019164
- The Origin of Civilizations and the World of Great Unity (文明源头与大同世界), Guangming Press, 2017, ISBN 9789887705291

Academic offices
Preceded by Sun Xiaomin	Dean of Shantou University Law School; 2007–2009	Succeeded by Yang Cheng
Preceded by Shan Feiyue	Dean of Hunan University Law School; 2010–2015	Succeeded by Qu Maohui
