= Egyptian chronology =

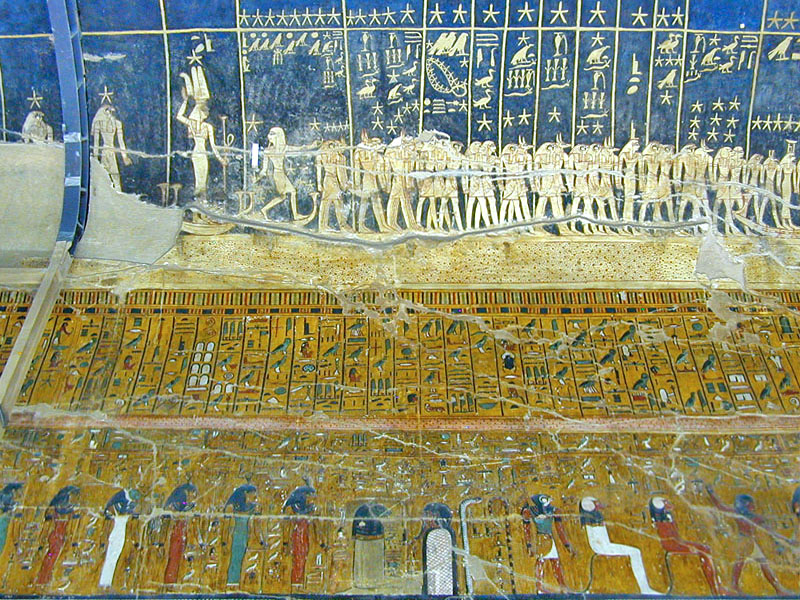
Astronomical ceiling from the tomb of Seti I showing stars and constellations used in calendar calculations

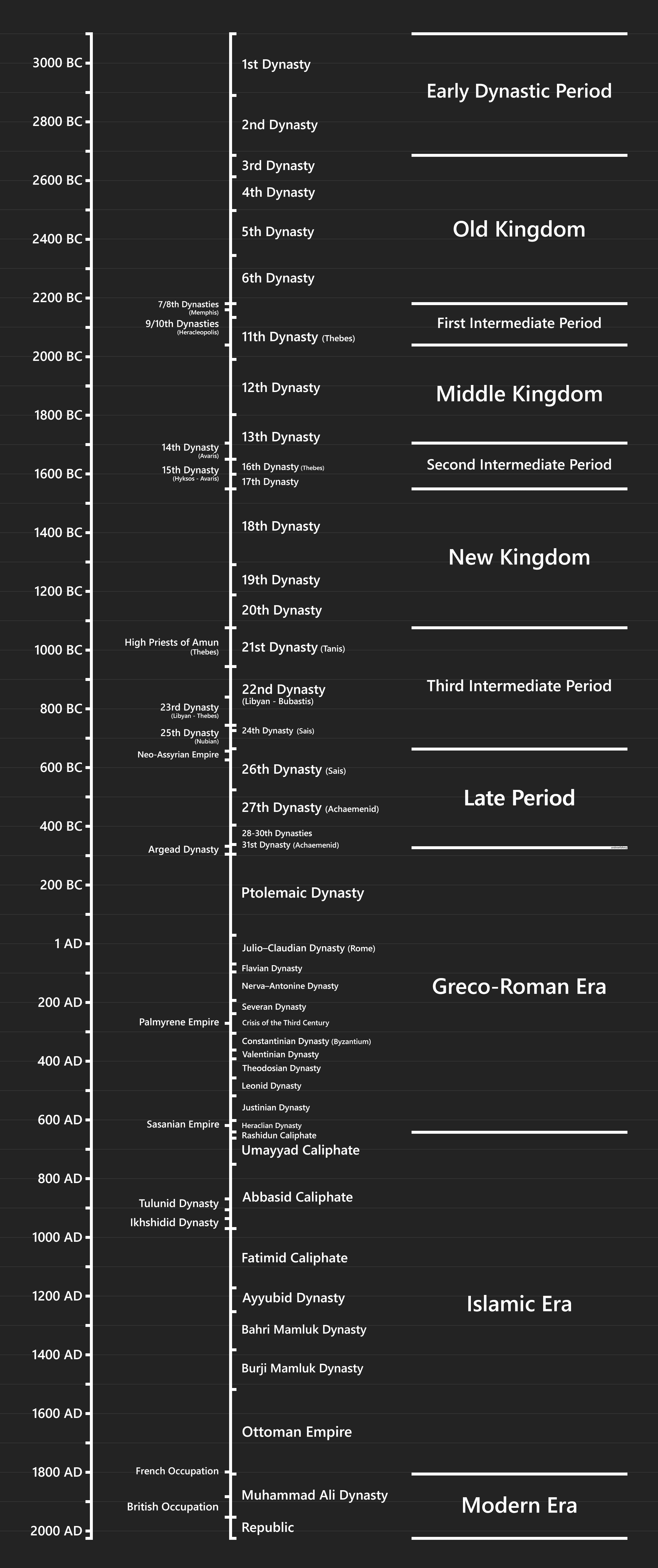
Egyptian chronology to approximate scale, including medieval and modern Egypt

The Conventional Egyptian chronology reflects the broad scholarly consensus about the outline and many details of the chronology of Ancient Egypt. It places the beginning of the Old Kingdom in the 27th century BC, the beginning of the Middle Kingdom in the 21st century BC and the beginning of the New Kingdom in the mid-16th century BC.

Disagreements remain within this consensus, and various chronologies diverge by about 300 years for the Early Dynastic Period, up to 30 years in the New Kingdom, and a few years in the Late Period.

In addition, there are a number of "alternative chronologies" outside scholarly consensus, such as the "New Chronology" proposed in the 1990s, which lowers New Kingdom dates by as much as 350 years, or the "Glasgow Chronology" (proposed 1978–1982), which lowers New Kingdom dates by as much as 500 years.

== Overview ==
Scholarly consensus on the general outline of the conventional chronology current in Egyptology has not fluctuated much over the last 100 years. For the Old Kingdom, consensus fluctuates by as much as a few centuries, but for the Middle and New Kingdoms, it has been stable to within a few decades.

All dates in the table are BC and should be treated as only approximates.

Periods	Dynasty	Breasted (1906)	Shaw (2000)	Hornung (2006)	C14 dating
Early Dynastic Period of Egypt	First	3400–2980	3000–2890	2900–2730 (± 25)	began ∿ 3100 (± 100)
Early Dynastic Period of Egypt	Second	3400–2980	2890–2686	2730–2590 (± 25)	began ∿ 3100 (± 100)
Old Kingdom	Third	2980–2900	2686–2613	2592–2544 (± 25)	began ∿ 2650 (± 50)
Old Kingdom	Fourth	2900–2750	2613–2494	2543–2436 (± 25)	began ∿ 2610 (± 40)
Old Kingdom	Fifth	2750–2625	2494–2345	2435–2306 (± 25)	began ∿ 2510 (± 40)
Old Kingdom	Sixth	2623–2475	2345–2181	2305–2118 (± 25)	began ∿ 2480 (± 60)
First Intermediate Period	Seventh?	2475–2445	2181–2160	2150–2118 (± 25)	no data
First Intermediate Period	Eighth	2475–2445	2181–2160	2150–2118 (± 25)	no data
First Intermediate Period	Ninth	2445–2160	2160–2125	2118–1980 (± 25)	no data
First Intermediate Period	Tenth?	2445–2160	2160–2125	2118–1980 (± 25)	no data
Middle Kingdom of Egypt	Eleventh	2160–2000	2125–1985	1980–1940 (± 16)	began ∿ 2050 (± 20)
Middle Kingdom of Egypt	Twelfth	2000–1788	1985–1773	1939 (±16) –1760	began ∿ 1980 (± 20)
Second Intermediate Period	Thirteenth?	1780–1580	began ∿ 1773	1759–1630	began ∿ 1760 (± 30)
Second Intermediate Period	Fourteenth?	1780–1580	1773–1650	no data	began ∿ 1760 (± 30)
Second Intermediate Period	Fifteenth	1780–1580	1650–1550	ended ∿ 1530	began ∿ 1760 (± 30)
Second Intermediate Period	Sixteenth	1780–1580	1650–1580	ended ∿ 1540	began ∿ 1760 (± 30)
Second Intermediate Period	Seventeenth	1780–1580	1580–1550	ended ∿ 1540	began ∿ 1760 (± 30)
New Kingdom of Egypt	Eighteenth	1580–1350	1550–1295	1539–1292	began ∿ 1550 (± 20)
New Kingdom of Egypt	Nineteenth	1350–1205	1295–1186	1292–1191	began ∿ 1300 (± 10)
New Kingdom of Egypt	Twentieth	1200–1090	1186–1069	1190–1077	began ∿ 1190 (± 10)
Third Intermediate Period	Twenty-first	1090–945	1069–945	1076–944	
Third Intermediate Period	Twenty-second	945–745	945–818	943–746	
Third Intermediate Period	Twenty-third	745–718	818–727	uncertain	
Third Intermediate Period	Twenty-fourth	718–712	727–715	736–723	
Third Intermediate Period	Twenty-fifth	712–663	715–664	722–655	
Late Period of ancient Egypt	Twenty-sixth	663–525	664–525	664–525	

The disparities between these sets of dates result from additional discoveries and refined understanding of the still very incomplete source evidence. For example, Breasted adds a ruler in the Twentieth dynasty that further research showed did not exist. Following Manetho, Breasted also believed all the dynasties were sequential, whereas it is now known that several existed at the same time. These revisions have resulted in a lowering of the conventional chronology by up to 400 years at the beginning of Dynasty I.

== Regnal years ==
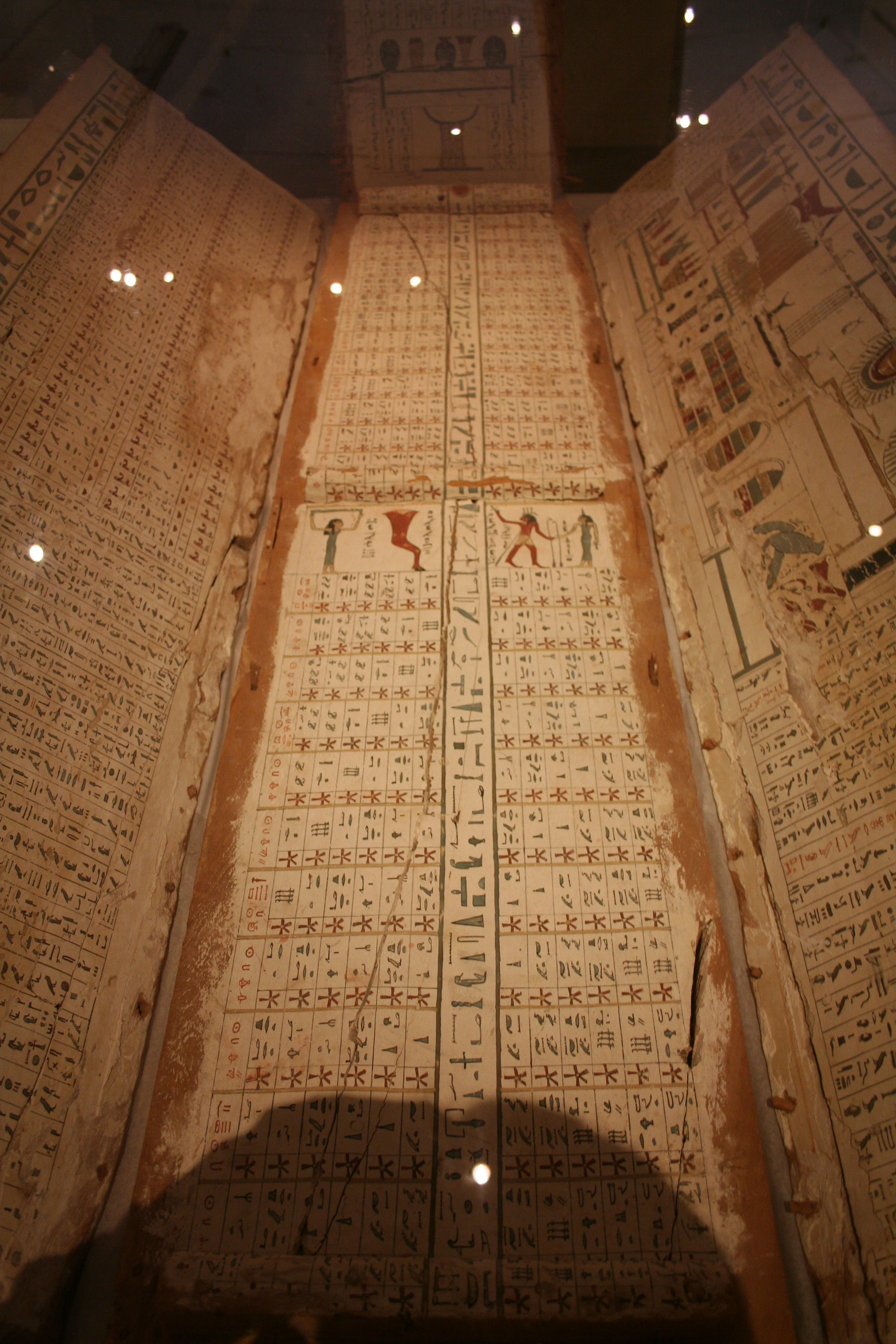
'Diagonal star table' from the Eleventh Dynasty coffin lid; found at Asyut, Egypt. Roemer- und Pelizaeus-Museum Hildesheim

Forming the backbone of Egyptian chronology are the regnal years as recorded in Ancient Egyptian king lists. Surviving king lists are either comprehensive but have significant gaps in their text (for example, the Turin King List), or are textually complete but fail to provide a complete list of rulers (for example, the Abydos King List and the Palermo Stone), even for a short period of Egyptian history. The situation is further complicated by occasional conflicting information on the same regnal period from different versions of the same text; thus, the Egyptian historian Manetho's history of Egypt is only known by epitomes and references to it made by subsequent writers, such as Eusebius and Sextus Julius Africanus, and the length of reign for the same pharaoh often varies substantially depending on the intermediate source.

Regnal periods have to be pieced together from inscriptions, which will often give a date in the form of the regnal year of the ruling pharaoh. Yet this only provides a minimum length of that reign and may or may not include any coregencies with a predecessor or successor. In addition, some Egyptian dynasties probably overlapped, with different pharaohs ruling in different regions at the same time, rather than serially. Not knowing whether monarchies were simultaneous or sequential results in widely differing chronological interpretations.

Where the total number of regnal years for a given ruler is not known, Egyptologists have identified two indicators to deduce that total number: for the Old Kingdom, the number of cattle censuses; and for later periods, the celebration of a Sed festival. A number of Old Kingdom inscriptions allude to a periodic census of cattle, which experts at first believed took place every second year; thus records of as many as 24 cattle censuses indicate Sneferu had reigned 48 years. However, further research has shown that these censuses were sometimes taken in consecutive years, or after two or more years had passed. The Sed festival was usually celebrated on the thirtieth anniversary of a pharaoh's ascension, and thus rulers who recorded celebrating one could be assumed to have ruled at least 30 years. However, once again, this may not have been standard practice in all cases.

In the early days of Egyptology, the compilation of regnal periods was also hampered by a profound biblical bias on the part of Egyptologists. This was most pervasive before the mid 19th century, when Manetho's figures were recognized as conflicting with biblical chronology, based on Old Testament references to Egypt (see Pharaohs in the Bible). In the 20th century, such biblical bias has mostly been confined to alternative chronologies outside the scholarly mainstream.

== Synchronisms ==
A useful way to work around these gaps in knowledge is to find chronological synchronisms, which can lead to a precise date. Over the past decades, a number of these have been found, although they are of varying degrees of usefulness and reliability.

- Seriation, i.e. archeological sequences. This does not fix a person or event to a specific year, but establishing a sequence of events can provide indirect evidence to provide or support a precise date. For example, some inscribed stone vessels of the rulers of the first two dynasties were collected and deposited in storage galleries beneath and sealed off when the Step Pyramid of Djoser, a Pharaoh of the Third Dynasty, was built. Another example are blocks from the Old Kingdom bearing the names of several kings, which were reused in the construction of Middle Kingdom pyramid-temples at Lisht in the structures of Amenemhat I. Likewise, the third pylon at Karnak, built by Amenhotep III contained as "fill" material from the kiosk of Sesostris I, along with various stelae of the Second Intermediate Period and the Eighteenth Dynasty of the New Kingdom.
- Synchronisms with other chronologies, the most important of these being with the Assyrian and Babylonian chronologies, but synchronisms with the Hittites, ancient Palestine, and in the final period with ancient Greece, are also used. The earliest such synchronism is in the 18th century BC where a stela of the governor of Byblos Yantinu indicates that pharaoh Neferhotep I was contemporary with kings Zimri-Lim of Mari and Hammurabi of Babylon. Other early synchronisms date to the 15th century BC, during the Amarna Period, when we have a considerable quantity of diplomatic correspondence between the Egyptian Kings Amenhotep III and Akhenaten (or possibly Smenkhkare), and various Near Eastern monarchs. (See Chronology of the Ancient Near East.) For the Third Intermediate Period, Shoshenq I has been ascribed a date relative to Rehoboam and the Eponym dating system by Kenneth Kitchen, based on biblical passages about Shishak's campaign. Shoshenq I's absolute date was calculated based on Edwin R. Thiele's theory.
- Synchronisms with memorials of Apis bull interments. These begin as early as the reign of Amenhotep III and continue into Ptolemaic times, but there is a significant gap in the record between Ramesses XI and the 23rd year of Osorkon II. The poor documentation of these finds by Auguste Mariette in the Serapeum of Saqqara has compounded the difficulties in using these records though Mariette's notebooks have now become available.
- Astronomical synchronisms. The best known of these is the Sothic cycle, and careful study of this led Richard A. Parker to argue that the dates of the Twelfth dynasty could be fixed with absolute precision. More recent research has eroded this confidence, questioning many of the assumptions used with the Sothic Cycle, and as a result experts have moved away from relying on this Cycle. For example, Donald B. Redford, in attempting to fix the date of the end of the Eighteenth dynasty, almost completely ignores the Sothic evidence, relying on synchronicities between Egypt and Assyria (by way of the Hittites), and help from astronomical observations.
- Radiocarbon dating. This is useful especially for the Early Dynastic period, where Egyptological consensus has only been possible within a range of about three or four centuries. Radiocarbon dating is roughly consistent with Shaw's conventional chronology. A 2013 study found a First Dynasty start in the 32nd or 31st century, compatible with scholarly opinions placing it in between the 34th and 30th centuries.
- The Thera eruption. This is a famous conundrum not just in Egyptian but also in Aegean (Minoan) chronology, as the radiocarbon date for the eruption, between 1627 and 1600 BC (p=5%), is off by a full century compared to the date traditionally accepted in archaeology of c. 1500 BC. Since 2012, there have been suggestions that the solution lies in adjusting both dates towards a "compromise" date in the mid 16th century BC, but as of 2023 the problem has not been satisfactorily resolved.
- Dendrochronology. There have been occasional opportunities to use dendrochronology to support Egyptian chronology, mostly for the New Kingdom period, e.g. the Uluburun shipwreck. Combined use of dendrochronology and radiocarbon dating allowed identification of tree rings even back to the Middle Kingdom period, as in the coffin of Ipi-ha-ishutef (dated 2073±9 BC) or the funerary boat of Senusret III (dated 1887±11 BC; conventional reign date 1878–1839 BC).

== Alternative chronologies ==
A number of suggestions for alternatives to the consensus on the conventional chronology have been presented during the 20th century:

- The Revised Chronology of Immanuel Velikovsky as postulated in his Ages in Chaos series.
- The chronology of Donovan Courville as described in The Exodus Problem and Its Ramifications.
- The Glasgow Chronology formulated by members of Velikovsky's Society for Interdisciplinary Studies in 1978.
- The Centuries of Darkness (1991) model by Peter James et al. "would move the end of the Egyptian New Kingdom from 1070 BC to around 825 BC", and lower all earlier dates with it, due to miscalculations of the Third Intermediate Period.
- The New Chronology of David Rohl, as described in his Test of Time series.

== See also ==
- History of ancient Egypt
- List of Pharaohs
- Chronology of the Ancient Near East
- Biblical chronology
- Dating methodologies in archaeology

== Sources ==
- Shaw, Ian, ed. (2003) [2000]. The Oxford History of Ancient Egypt. Oxford: Oxford University Press. pp. 490–495. ISBN 978-0-19-280458-7.
