= Gleb Nosovsky =

Russian mathematician (born 1958)

Gleb Vladimirovich Nosovsky or Nosovskiy (Russian: Глеб Владимирович Носовский; born 26 January 1958) is a Russian mathematician. He was born in Moscow, Russia.

In Russia, Nosovsky is known for his pseudoscientific publications on the New Chronology.

== Mathematical work ==
Candidate of Physics and Mathematics of Moscow State University, specialist in theory of probability, mathematical statistics, theory of probabilistic processes, theory of optimization, stochastic differential equations, computer modelling of stochastic processes, computer simulation. Worked as researcher of computer geometry in Russian Space Research Institute, in Moscow Machine Tools and Instruments Institute, in University of Aizu in Japan. Faculty member of the Department of Mathematics and Mechanics MSU.

== Historical revisionism ==
Since 1995 Gleb Nosovsky has been a permanent co-author of books on the New Chronology.

1. Together with Kalashnikov and Anatoly Fomenko dated the Almagest of Claudius Ptolemy to around eleven and sixteenth century.
2. Together with Fomenko dated some old Egyptian horoscopes ranging them from 1000 AD and up to as late as 1700 AD.
3. In 2003, together with Fomenko used astronomical methods to calculate that Jesus lived in 1152–1185 AD.

Most Russian scientists consider the New Chronology to be pseudoscientific.

== Books ==
- A.T. Fomenko, G.V. Nosovskiy, V.V. Kalashnikov: History: Fiction or Science? Chronology 3, Astronomical methods as applied to chronology. Ptolemy’s Almagest. Tycho Brahe. Copernicus. The Egyptian zodiacs. ISBN 2-913621-08-2
- A.T. Fomenko, G.V. Nosovskiy :History: Fiction or Science? Chronology 4, Russia.Britain.Byzantium.Rome. ISBN 2-913621-10-4
