= Miao Litian =

Chinese philosopher (1917–2000)

Miao Litian (Chinese: 苗力田; 1917 – 28 May 2000) was a Chinese translator and professor of Western philosophy, specializing in Greek philosophy. He was the main translator of the Works of Aristotle into Chinese.

== Biography ==
Miao was born in Tongjiang, Heilongjiang in 1917. As a teenager, he became interested in philosophy under the guidance of his teachers, and after the Japanese invasion of Manchuria, he left his hometown and came to Beiping to join the resistance. After the Battle of Beiping–Tianjin, he left Beiping again and came to Nanjing via Shandong to continue his studies. He was forced to leave Nanjing again before the Battle of Nanjing, and then came to Xiangtan via Wuhan and Changsha to study. He graduated from high school in Xiangtan and walked to Chongqing, where he enrolled in the Department of Philosophy of National Central University in 1939, where his supervisor was Chen Chung-hwan.

In 1941, he joined the Flying Tigers and worked as a translator for a while. He then went on to attend graduate school at the National Central University, where he stayed on after graduation. After the Second Sino-Japanese War, the National Central University moved back to Nanjing. After the Yangtze River Crossing campaign, he taught at Nanjing University, and then joined Peking University in 1952. In 1956, the Department of Philosophy was established at Renmin University of China, and Miao was again transferred from Peking University to Renmin University of China. During the Cultural Revolution, Miao stopped teaching and was sent down to a May 7 Cadre School. After the Cultural Revolution, Miao began teaching again. Beginning in the 1980s, Miao began working with his graduate and doctoral students to translate the Works of Aristotle into Chinese, a task that was finally completed in 1997. He then went on to lead a translation of Gesammelte Schriften (Kant's writings), which however could not be completed before his death.

On May 28, 2000, Miao passed away.
