= Phantom time conspiracy theory =

1991 pseudohistorical conspiracy theory

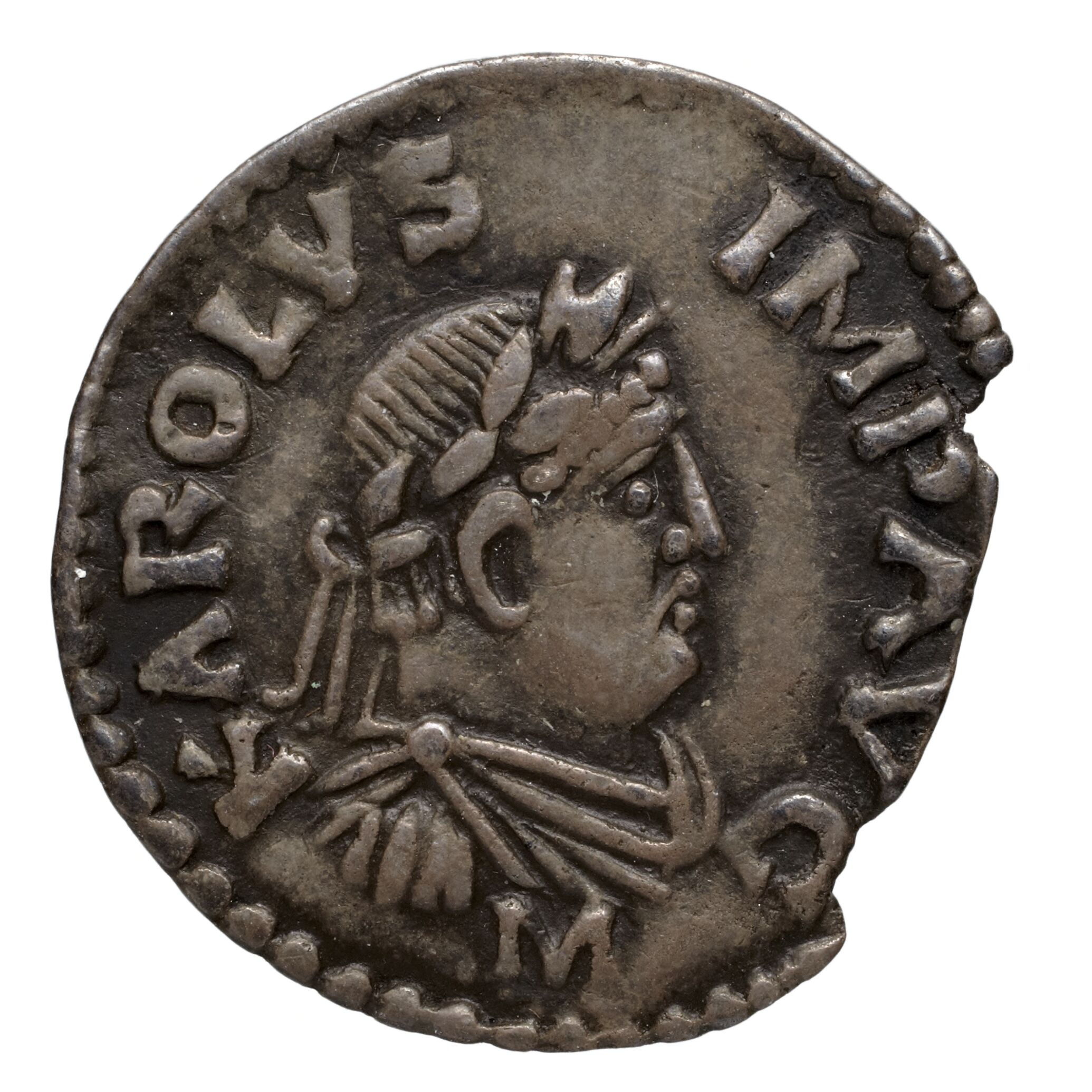
The phantom time hypothesis claims Charlemagne did not exist.

The phantom time conspiracy theory is a pseudohistorical conspiracy theory first asserted by Heribert Illig in 1991. It hypothesizes a conspiracy by the Holy Roman Emperor Otto III and Pope Sylvester II to fabricate the Anno Domini dating system retroactively, in order to place them at the special year of AD 1000, and to rewrite history to legitimize Otto's claim to the Holy Roman Empire. Illig believed that this was achieved through the alteration, misrepresentation and forgery of documentary and physical evidence. According to this scenario, the entire Carolingian period, including the figure of Charlemagne, is a fabrication, with a "phantom time" of 297 years (AD 614–911) added to the Early Middle Ages.

Overwhelming evidence—such as archaeological remains, scientific dating methods, astronomical records as well as calendars in other European countries, most of Asia and parts of pre-Columbian America—contradict the hypothesis and it failed to gain the support of historians and archaeologists.

Another version of phantom time with a longer time loss is suggested in Florin Diacu's 2006 book The Lost Millennium: History's Timetables Under Siege.

== Heribert Illig ==
Illig was born in 1947 in Vohenstrauß, Bavaria. He was active in an association dedicated to Immanuel Velikovsky, catastrophism and historical revisionism, the Gesellschaft zur Rekonstruktion der Menschheits- und Naturgeschichte (English: Society for the Reconstruction of Human and Natural History). From 1989 to 1994, he acted as editor of the journal Vorzeit-Frühzeit-Gegenwart (English: Prehistory-Proto-History-Present). Since 1995, he has worked as a publisher and author under his own publishing company, Mantis-Verlag, and publishing his own journal, Zeitensprünge (English: Leaps in Time). Outside of his publications related to revised chronology, he has edited the works of Egon Friedell.

Before focusing on the early medieval period, Illig published various proposals for revised chronologies of prehistory and of Ancient Egypt. His proposals received prominent coverage in German popular media in the 1990s. His 1996 Das erfundene Mittelalter (English: The Invented Middle Ages) also received scholarly reviews, but was universally rejected as fundamentally flawed by historians. In 1997, the journal Ethik und Sozialwissenschaften (English: Ethics and Social Sciences) offered a platform for critical discussion to Illig's proposal, with a number of historians commenting on its various aspects. After 1997, there has been little scholarly reception of Illig's ideas, although they continued to be discussed as pseudohistory in German popular media.

== Claims ==
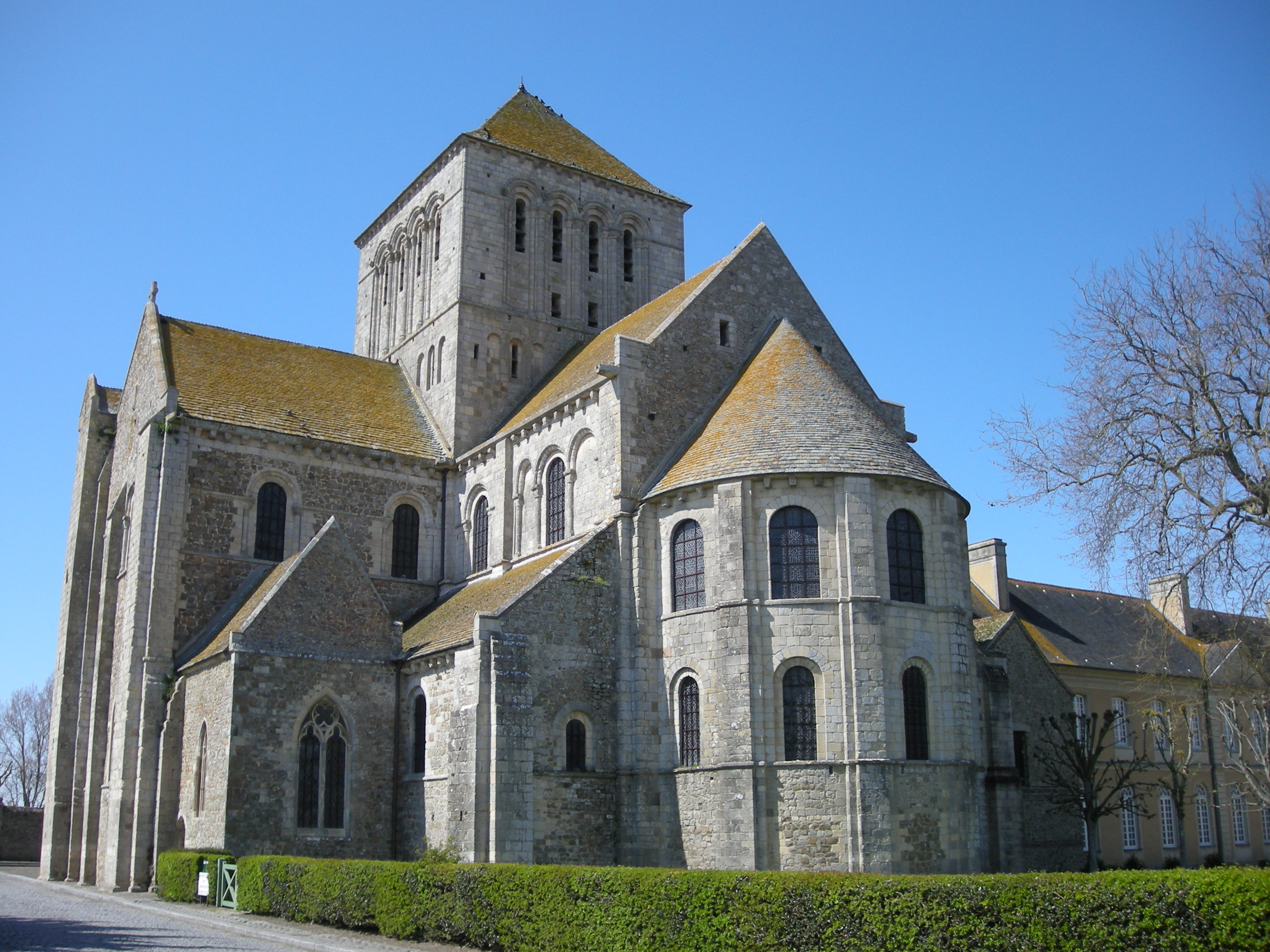
Lessay Abbey, an example of Romanesque architecture

Illig's claims include:

- That there is a scarcity of archaeological evidence that can be reliably dated to the period AD 614–911.
- That the dating methods used for such recent periods, radiometry and dendrochronology, are inaccurate.
- That medieval historians rely too much on written sources.
- That the presence of Romanesque architecture in tenth-century Western Europe suggests that the Roman era was not as long ago as conventionally thought.
- That at the time of the introduction of the Gregorian calendar in AD 1582, there should have been a discrepancy of thirteen days between the Julian calendar and the real (or tropical) calendar, when the astronomers and mathematicians working for Pope Gregory XIII had found that the civil calendar needed to be adjusted by only ten days. From this, Illig concludes that the AD era had counted roughly three centuries which never existed.

== Refutation ==
- Observations in ancient astronomy, especially those of solar eclipses cited by European sources prior to 600 AD (when phantom time would have distorted the chronology), agree with the usual chronology and not with Illig's. Besides several others that are perhaps too vague to disprove the phantom time hypothesis, two in particular are dated with enough precision to question the hypothesis. One is reported by Pliny the Elder in 59 AD. This date has a confirmed eclipse. In addition, observations during the Tang dynasty in China, and Halley's Comet, for example, are consistent with current astronomy with no "phantom time" added.
- Archaeological remains and dating methods such as dendrochronology (tree-ring dating) refute, rather than support, "phantom time".
- The Gregorian reform was never purported to bring the calendar in line with the Julian calendar as it had existed at the time of its institution in 45 BC, but as it had existed in 325 AD, the time of the Council of Nicaea, which had established a method for determining the date of Easter Sunday by fixing the vernal equinox on March 21 in the Julian calendar. By 1582, the astronomical equinox was occurring on March 10 in the Julian calendar, but Easter was still being calculated from a nominal equinox on March 21. In 45 BC, the astronomical vernal equinox took place around March 23. Illig's "three missing centuries" thus correspond to the 369 years between the institution of the Julian calendar in 45 BC, and the fixing of the Easter Date at the Council of Nicaea in 325 AD.
- If Charlemagne and the Carolingian dynasty were fabricated, there would have to be a corresponding fabrication of the history of the rest of Europe during the same era, including Anglo-Saxon England, the Papacy, and the Byzantine Empire. The "phantom time" period also encompasses the life of Muhammad and the Islamic expansion into the areas of the former Western Roman Empire, including the conquest of Visigothic Iberia. This history too would have to be forged or drastically misdated. It would also have to be reconciled with the history of the Tang dynasty of China and its contact with the Islamic world, such as at the Battle of Talas.

== See also ==
- Cultural depictions of Otto III, Holy Roman Emperor
- Historical negationism
- The Chronology of Ancient Kingdoms Amended
- Glasgow Chronology
- New Chronology (Fomenko)
- New Chronology (Rohl)
- Revised chronology of Immanuel Velikovsky
- Jean Hardouin
- Historicity of Muhammad
- Simulation hypothesis

== Sources ==
- Illig, Heribert: Enthält das frühe Mittelalter erfundene Zeit? and subsequent discussion, in: Ethik und Sozialwissenschaften 8 (1997), pp. 481–520.
- Schieffer, Rudolf: Ein Mittelalter ohne Karl den Großen, oder: Die Antworten sind jetzt einfach, in: Geschichte in Wissenschaft und Unterricht 48 (1997), pp. 611–17.
- Matthiesen, Stephan: Erfundenes Mittelalter – fruchtlose These!, in: Skeptiker 2 (2002).
