= Glasgow Chronology =

Proposed revision of ancient Egyptian chronology

The Glasgow Chronology is a proposed revision of the Egyptian chronology of ancient Egypt. It was first formulated between the years 1978 and 1982 by a working group following the Glasgow Conference of Society for Interdisciplinary Studies (SIS, a non-profit organization advocating serious academic analysis of the pseudoscientific writings of Immanuel Velikovsky and other catastrophists).

This chronology placed the Eighteenth Dynasty of Egypt some five hundred years later than the conventional chronology of Egypt.

== Formation ==
The Glasgow Chronology was initially presented at an SIS conference that was held in 1978 in Glasgow and entitled "Ages in Chaos?" Flaws were pointed out in it almost immediately, and by the 1980s, all of its original proponents had abandoned it in favour of other chronologies.

The Glasgow Chronology accepted all the character identifications proposed by Velikovsky in Ages in Chaos (1952). Thus Hatshepsut, who visited the Divine Land, was equated with the Queen of Sheba, who visited Solomon in Jerusalem, whilst Thutmose III, who followed Hatshepsut, was equated with Shishak, who plundered the Jerusalem temple after the death of Solomon. Velikovsky therefore reduced the age of the Eighteenth Dynasty by five centuries. However, in his subsequently published Ramses II and his Time (1978), he brought the Nineteenth dynasty down by roughly seven centuries, thus opening a two-century gap between the Eighteenth and Nineteenth dynasties. Despite the Glasgow Chronology intent of reducing the age of the Nineteenth dynasty by five centuries and allowing it to naturally follow from the Eighteenth dynasty, its original proponents concluded that it was historically unsupportable.

== See also ==
- Phantom time hypothesis
