= Joshua's Hill =

Prominence in northeast Istanbul

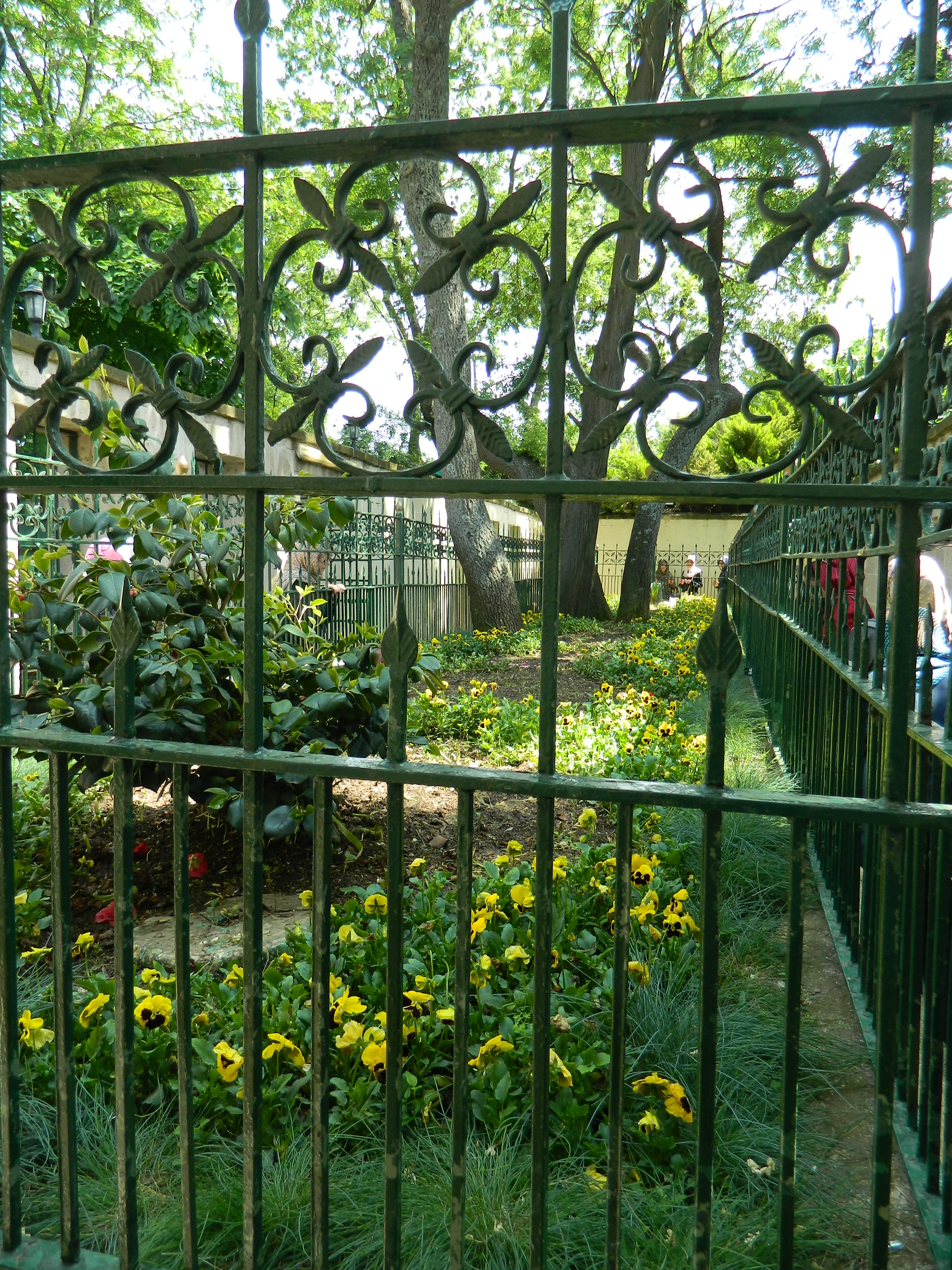

Highest point
- Elevation: 195 m (640 ft)
- Coordinates: 41°09′45.18″N 29°05′6.90″E

Naming
- Native name: Yuşa Tepesi (Turkish)

Geography
- Location within Turkey
- Location: Bosporus, Beykoz, Istanbul, Turkey

Geology
- Mountain type: Hill

Joshua's Hill (Turkish: Yuşa Tepesi or Hazreti Yuşa Tepesi), a hill located on the Anatolian shore of the Bosporus in the Beykoz district of Istanbul, Turkey, is a shrine consisting of a mosque and a tomb dedicated to Yusha (Turkish: Hazreti Yuşa). The summit of the hill is 202 metres (663 feet) above sea level and an important landmark for vessels coming from the Black Sea. On the summit is a terrace with benches for the comfort of pilgrims visiting the mosque and the tomb of Saint Joshua. To the north of the hill is Yoros Castle.

== History ==
Although the hill is now a center for Muslim pilgrimage, it had been sanctified long before the coming of Islam. At one time there was a temple to Zeus on its summit and the peak was known as the Bed of Hercules. In Byzantine times this was replaced by a church dedicated to the angel Michael which was destroyed by an earthquake in 1509.

== Tomb of Joshua ==
At the top of the hill stands a giant symbolic grave known to Europeans as the "Giant's Grave". Some Muslims believe it to be the tomb of Yuşa (Joshua) although there are alternative possible sites in Israel (the Shia shrine at Al-Nabi Yusha'), Jordan (An-Nabi Yusha' bin Noon, a Sunni shrine near the city of Al-Salt) and Iraq (the Nabi Yusha' shrine of Baghdad).

A flat, rectangular earthen rise 17 meters (56 ft) long and 2 meters (6.6 ft) wide, the unroofed area is surrounded by a cast-iron grate. Local inhabitants consider the grave miraculous and come here to pray to be healed of their illnesses.

The tomb area is planted with miniature begonias and surrounded by mature trees. At one end of the grave are two cylindrical stones reminiscent of small millstones. In the centre of one of them are a quadrangular opening and a very noticeable fissure. The grave is surrounded by a stone wall containing two doors and several windows. Visitors enter through one of the doors, pass around the grave in a circle and exit through the second one.

== Yusha Mosque ==
Beside the grave is the small Hazrat Yusha Mosque (Turkish: Hazreti Yuşa Cami), built by Grand Vizier Yirmisekizzade Mehmed Said Pasha in 1755. It had stone walls and a split roof structure before it was damaged by a fire. The mosque was restored in the reign of Ottoman Sultan Abdulaziz in 1863.

== See also ==
- List of ziyarat locations
- Ziyarat
- Shrine of Khidr
