= Anatoly Fomenko =

Russian mathematician

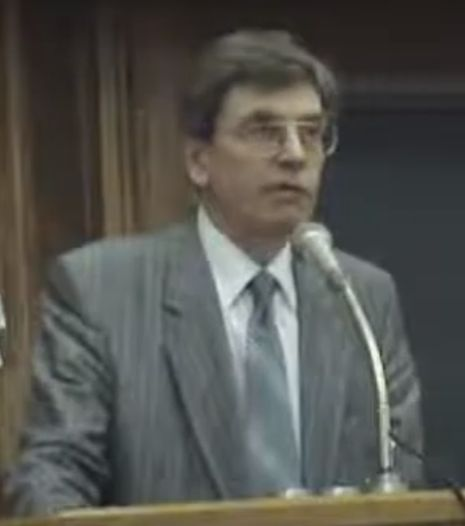
- Fomenko in 2012
- Born: 13 March 1945 (age 81); Stalino, Ukrainian Soviet Socialist Republic, USSR (now Donetsk, Ukraine)
- Education: Moscow State University
- Occupations: Mathematician; Professor
- Employer: Moscow State University
- Known for: New Chronology
- Awards: State Prize of the Russian Federation

Anatoly Timofeyevich Fomenko (Russian: Анато́лий Тимофе́евич Фоме́нко; born 13 March 1945 in Stalino, USSR) is a Soviet and Russian professor of Mathematics at Moscow State University. He is well-known as a topologist and member of the Russian Academy of Sciences. He is a painter and illustrator of original artworks inspired by topological objects and structures.

Fomenko is also widely known as a conspiracy theorist. He originated a pseudoscientific theory called New Chronology, based on works of Russian-Soviet writer Nikolai Alexandrovich Morozov.

== Biography ==
Fomenko is the son of Timofey Grigoryevich Fomenko, an industrial engineer, and Valentina Polikarpovna Markova, a philologist and teacher of Russian language and literature. His parents would later co-author his works on New Chronology in 1983 and 1996. Born in what is now Donetsk, he was raised and schooled in Magadan. In 1959, his family returned to Eastern Ukraine and settled in the city of Luhansk, where Fomenko attended Secondary School No. 26. During secondary school, Fomenko participated in many competitions relating to mathematics and won several medals as a result. Also in 1959, the magazine Pionerskaya Pravda (Russian: Пионерская правда, Pioneer Truth) published his first known science fiction story, "The Mystery of the Milky Way".

Fomenko graduated from the Mechanics and Mathematics Department of Moscow State University in 1967. In 1969, he began studying differential geometry in the same department. In 1970, he defended his thesis "Classification of totally geodesic manifolds realizing nontrivial cycles in Riemannian homogeneous spaces", and in 1972 defended his doctoral thesis, "The decision of the multidimensional plateau problems on Riemannian manifolds." In December 1981, he became a professor of Higher Geometry and Topology, and in 1992, was appointed as head of Differential Geometry and Applications in the Department of Mathematics and Mechanics at Moscow State University.

== Mathematical work ==
Fomenko developed the theory of topological invariants of an integrable Hamiltonian system. He is the author of 180 scientific publications and 26 textbooks (including monographs) on mathematics. Fomenko is a specialist in geometry and topology, variational calculus, symplectic topology, Hamiltonian geometry and mechanics, and computational geometry.

Fomenko has served as the editor of several Russian-language mathematics journals and is a member of many councils overseeing dissertations in his field. In 1996, he won the State Prize of the Russian Federation for excellence in mathematics. He is a full member (Academician) of the Russian Academy of Sciences (1994), the International Higher Education Academy of Sciences (1993), and the Russian Academy of Technological Sciences (2009). He is also a member of the Russian Academy of Natural Sciences (1991).

Fomenko is the author of extensive writings in his original fields of mathematics, and is also known for his original drawings inspired by topological objects and structures.

== Historical revisionism ==
Fomenko is one of the authors of a concept that manipulates historical chronology called New Chronology. Fomenko claims to have discovered new empirico‑statistical methods and applied them to show many historical events are misdated. Based on this, he asserts that ancient history (including Greece, Rome, and Egypt) merely reflects medieval events, while Chinese and Arab histories are fabrications by 17th‑ and 18th‑century Jesuits. Fomenko is the author or co‑author of several books on the analysis of historical chronicles and on the chronology of antiquity and the Middle Ages.

He also claims that Jesus lived in the 12th century A.D. and was crucified on Joshua's Hill; that the Trojan War and the Crusades were the same historical event; and that Genghis Khan and the Mongols were actually Russians, that the lands west of the Thirteen Colonies that now constitute the American West and Middle West were a far eastern part of "Siberian-American Empire" prior to its disintegration in 1775, and many other claims that contradict conventional historiography. As well as disputing written chronologies, Fomenko also disputes scientific dating techniques such as dendrochronology and radiocarbon dating. His books include Empirico-statistical Analysis of Narrative Material and Its Applications, and History: Fiction or Science?.

Most Russian scientists and worldwide historians consider Fomenko's historical works to be either pseudoscientific or antiscientific.

== Artwork ==
Fomenko is a painter and illustrator whose work often depicts objects from mathematics, many related to topology.

== Publications ==
=== Mathematical ===
- A.V.Bolsinov and A.T. Fomenko : Integrable Hamiltonian Systems: Geometry, Topology, Classification (Hardcover), ISBN 0-415-29805-9
- B. A. Dubrovin, S. P. Novikov, A. T. Fomenko Modern Geometry. Methods and Applications. Springer-Verlag, GTM 93, Part 1, 1984; GTM 104, Part 2, 1985. Part 3, 1990, GTM 124.
- A.T. Fomenko, V. V. Trofimov Integrable Systems on Lie Algebras and Symmetric Spaces. Gordon and Breach, 1987.
- A.T. Fomenko Differential Geometry and Topology Plenum Publishing Corporation. 1987. USA, Consultants Bureau, New York and London.
- A.T. Fomenko Integrability and Nonintegrability in Geometry and Mechanics. Kluwer Academic Publishers, The Netherlands, 1988.
- A.T. Fomenko Tensor and Vector Analysis: Geometry, Mechanics and Physics. – Taylor and Francis, 1988.
- A.T. Fomenko Symplectic Geometry. Methods and Applications. Gordon and Breach, 1988. Second edition 1995.
- A.T. Fomenko, S. P. Novikov The basic elements of differential geometry and topology. Kluwer Acad. Publishers, The Netherlands, 1990.
- A.T. Fomenko, Richard Lipkin, Mathematical Impressions, American Mathematical Society, 1990, 184 pp. ISBN 0-8218-0162-7
- A.T. Fomenko The Plateau Problem (vols. 1, 2). Gordon and Breach, 1990. (Studies in the Development of Modern Mathematics.)
- A.T. Fomenko Variational Principles of Topology. Multidimensional Minimal Surface Theory. Kluwer Academic Publishers, The Netherlands, 1990.
- A.T. Fomenko Topological variational problems. – Gordon and Breach, 1991.
- A.T. Fomenko, Dao Chong Thi Minimal surfaces and Plateau problem. USA, American Mathematical Society, 1991.
- A.T. Fomenko, A.A.Tuzhilin Geometry of Minimal Surfaces in Three-Dimensional Space. USA, American Mathematical Society. In: Translation of Mathematical Monographs. vol.93, 1991.
- A.T. Fomenko Topological Classification of Integrable Systems. Advances in Soviet Mathematics, vol. 6. USA, American Mathematical Society, 1991.
- A.T. Fomenko Visual geometry and topology. Springer-Verlag, 1994.
- A.T. Fomenko, S.V.Matveev Algorithmic and Computer Methods for Three-Manifolds. Kluwer Academic Publishers, The Netherlands, 1997.
- A.T. Fomenko, T.L. Kunii Topological Modeling for Visualization. – Springer-Verlag, 1997.
- A.T. Fomenko, A. V. Bolsinov Integrable Hamiltonian Systems: Geometry, Topology, Classification. Taylor and Francis, 2003.
- A.T. Fomenko, D. B. Fuchs Homotopical Topology. Springer. Second edition, GTM 273, 2016.

=== Pseudohistorical ===
- Fomenko A.T. «Some new empirico–statistical methods of dating and the analysis of present global chronology»,— London: The British Library, Department of printed books. Cup. 918/87, 1981.
- A.T. Fomenko, V. V Kalashnikov., G. V. Nosovsky Geometrical and Statistical Methods of Analysis of Star Configurations. Dating Ptolemy's Almagest. – CRC-Press, USA, 1993.
- A.T. Fomenko Empirico-Statistical Analysis of Narrative Material and its Applications to Historical Dating. Vol.1: The Development of the Statistical Tools. Vol.2: The Analysis of Ancient and Medieval Records. – Kluwer Academic Publishers. The Netherlands, 1994.
- A.T. Fomenko New Methods of Statistical Analysis of Historical Texts. Applications to Chronology. Antiquity in the Middle Ages. Greek and Bible History. Vols.1, 2, 3. – Lewiston, New York: Edwin Mellen Press, 1999.
- Fomenko A.T. «Antiquity in the Middle Ages. Greek and Bible History», Lewiston, New York: Edwin Mellen Press, (Scholarly Monographs in the Russian Language), 1999.
- A.T. Fomenko et al.: History: Fiction or Science? Chronology 1, Introducing the problem. A criticism of the Scaligerian chronology. Dating methods as offered by mathematical statistics. Eclipses and zodiacs. ISBN 2-913621-07-4
- A.T. Fomenko et al.: History: Fiction or Science? Chronology 2, The dynastic parallelism method. Rome. Troy. Greece. The Bible. Chronological shifts. ISBN 2-913621-06-6
- A.T. Fomenko et al.: History: Fiction or Science? Chronology 3, Astronomical methods as applied to chronology. Ptolemy’s Almagest. Tycho Brahe. Copernicus. The Egyptian zodiacs. ISBN 2-913621-08-2
- Nosovsky G.V., Fomenko А.Т. «Russia. Britain. Byzantium. Rome. History: Fiction or Science? Chronology vol. IV»,— Paris, London, New York: Mithec, Delamere Resources LLC, 2008, 727 pp.
