= C. Leroy Ellenberger =

American skeptic (1942–2025)

Charles Leroy Ellenberger
- C. Leroy Ellenberger at Fernbank Museum, Atlanta, Georgia, October 2005.
- Born: May 10, 1942; St. Louis, MO
- Died: May 29, 2025 (aged 83); St. Louis, MO
- Other name: C. Leroy

Charles Leroy Ellenberger (1942 - 2025, known as C. Leroy) was an advocate, but later a critic, of controversial writer Immanuel Velikovsky and his works on catastrophism. He first read Worlds in Collision in 1969. In 1979, he became a contributing editor (and later Senior Editor & Executive Secretary) to the Velikovsky-inspired Kronos journal, and has contributed material to many other publications. In 1980 he was selected by the editor of Astronomy magazine to debate James Oberg on Velikovsky.

His confidence in the validity of Velikovsky's ideas was shaken in January 1982 when Kronos sponsored his attendance at the semi-annual AAAS meeting in Washington, D.C., in order to distribute information on Velikovsky. In a wide-ranging conversation with Jeremy Cherfas, then a writer for the British weekly science magazine New Scientist over how the press misunderstood Velikovsky, Cherfas had counter-arguments to many points that Ellenberger was not able to rebut. According to Professor of Social Theory Alfred de Grazia at New York University, "By 1983 Ellenberger was preparing to abandon much of quantavolution and found now that the story of Velikovsky was not without its shady tones, and more important, that Arctic ice cores and bristlecone pine dating technologies were directly contradicting Holocene quantavolutions . . . ; further, that Gentry's studies of the surprising 'instant' polonium halos of creation . . . were probably invalid."

Henry Bauer described Ellenberger's role in the Velikovsky scene as follows: ". . . was a confidant to Velikovsky, a frequent visitor (often with camera) from April 1978 to his death in November 1979, and a Senior Editor of the Velikovskian journal Kronos, until the evidence forced him to conclude that Velikovsky's scientific claims were baseless. Velikovsky inscribed his copy of Ramses II and His Time 'To Leroy who is consumed by the sacred flame of search for truth', 20 May 1978, and gave him permission to sell 'Velikovsky's right!' T-shirts. Alfred de Grazia, impetus for The Velikovsky Affair (1966), appointed him chronicler of the continuing Velikovsky controversy in 1980.

Ellenberger's last contact with Velikovsky was a phone call from him two days before he died." Also, he "has tried unceasingly but to little avail to have his former colleagues acknowledge the accumulating evidence, for example, from Greenland ice cores, that Velikovsky's claimed catastrophes did not in fact occur. Ellenberger points out, too, that Velikovsky's writings have become superfluous: astronomically plausible argument and speculation about relatively recent cosmic catastrophism can now be found in the work of Victor Clube and Bill Napier (The Cosmic Serpent, 1982; The Cosmic Winter, 1990), where the testimony of myth and historical records is also taken into account."

Ellenberger had degrees in chemical engineering and finance & operations research (B.S., Washington University in St. Louis; M.B.A., University of Pennsylvania). He was a Medical Article Retrieval Specialist in St. Louis, Missouri.

== Velikovskian critic ==
C. Leroy Ellenberger with Immanuel Velikovsky at Seaside Heights, New Jersey, in 1978.

In 1984, Ellenberger noted:

" Over the past four years I have come to appreciate that, even if Velikovsky were right, there are good physical reasons why astronomers and other scientists have opposed him so tenaciously. Unfortunately, many of these reasons, often based on information developed since Velikovsky wrote his books, have never been discussed in Velikovskian forums or have never been discussed in a fully informed manner. Examples of the former include the Worzel Ash, ice cores, and plate tectonics. Examples of the latter include tree rings, ice age dynamics, geomagnetism, and cosmic electricity.

" Most often, spokesmen for mainstream science such as Sagan, Asimov, Gardner, and Oberg have not expressed their criticisms using valid arguments but, rather, tend to substitute polemic, ridicule, and caricature for serious discussion. The resulting performances are riddled with errors and are received by Velikovskian partisans with diminished credibility. Their fixation on Velikovsky's text to the exclusion of later researchers in Pensée and KRONOS has also been a source of frustration. As a result, focus has been shifted away from substantive criticism in depth with more cogent criticisms having gotten side-tracked."

Ellenberger's most widely read criticisms of Velikovsky were two 1985 correspondences to Nature: "Falsifying Velikovsky" vol. 316, p. 386, and "Velikovsky's evidence?" vol. 318, p. 204, and two 1987 letters to the editor in New York Times: May 15, p. 14, and August 29, p. 14. While citing these publications, Richard J. Huggett, Senior Lecturer in Geography, University of Manchester, averred that Ellenberger "has, since his conversion to the anti-Velikovsky camp in 1984, relentlessly and mercilessly tried to show why Velikovsky's ideas were downright silly. . . ." The second Times letter was rebutted by Clark Whelton in a letter published September 29. Although the Times did not print Ellenberger's point-by-point surrebuttal to Whelton's letter, it was distributed (a) privately by mail with the September 1, 1987 "Dear Friends" letter and (b) to all attendees at the August 1990 "Reconsidering Velikovsky" Conference in Toronto.

In 1994, Ellenberger's invitation to a conference on Velikovsky was rescinded, due to other participants' stating that they would not attend if he participated. This incident came about through the efforts of a group of individuals who in 1992 had deleted the section "Magnetism, Dynamos and Neptune" from Ellenberger's memoir for Aeon that explained the ignorance of Velikovsky and many of his supporters concerning the role of electromagnetism in astronomy and the origin of planetary magnetic fields. Previously, he was an invited speaker at Milton Zysman's August 1990 "Reconsidering Velikovsky" Conference at University of Toronto, identified on the program as "Velikovsky's most unrelenting critic" who was interviewed for The Globe and Mail, and he was the keynote speaker at the August 1992 Canadian Society for Interdisciplinary Studies conference in Haliburton, Ontario. He is also the author of the article "Top Ten Reasons Why Velikovsky Is Wrong About Worlds In Collision" which he says:

".. is based on 30 years exposure to Velikovsky's ideas which includes 8 years as an insider at the Velikovsky journal Kronos (1978 - 1986), confidant to Velikovsky (4/78 - 11/79), invited "Devil's Advocate" at Aeon ('88 - '91), and 13 years as a turncoat/critic interacting with Velikovsky's defenders and/or successors at conferences, in private, and in Usenet ('94 -'96) & list-serve forums."

Of these attempts to convince Velikovsky's supporters, Henry Bauer noted Ellenberger "has tried unceasingly but to little avail to have his former colleagues acknowledge the accumulating evidence, for example, from Greenland ice cores, that Velikovsky's claimed catastrophes did not in fact occur." His resignation from Kronos as senior editor in December 1986 was acknowledged by Martin Gardner, who previously noted Ellenberger's "vitriolic" letters defending Velikovsky. Regarding Ellenberger's defection, Skeptic editor Michael Shermer declared: "One major strike against Velikovsky is that Leroy Ellenberger, a one-time Velikovsky supporter, after stepping outside of the paradigm to examine the evidence in a clearer light, now completely rejects all tenets of the theory." Sagan biographer Keay Davidson credits Ellenberger "In my experience" as "the single richest source of information on the Velikovsky controversy." Astronomer Dennis Rawlins hails Ellenberger "the world's top anti-Velikovsky expert". NASA astronomer David Morrison, who has monitored the Velikovsky scene since 1972, has thanked Ellenberger for helping "to look at these issues from the other side and to appreciate how poorly the scientific critics communicated with the public." Ellenberger's role as a Velikovsky turncoat and critic has been recently affirmed by Ronald H. Fritze in Invented Knowledge: False History, Fake Science and Pseudo-religions. Princeton historian Michael Gordin acknowledged "a special debt of gratitude" to Ellenberger for his contributions to The Pseudoscience Wars.

== Clube and Napier's model ==
Ellenberger came to accept Victor Clube and Bill Napier's model as a scientifically valid and intellectually satisfying replacement for Velikovsky-inspired models of recent, interplanetary catastrophism. Astronomer David Morrison noted "In fact, the work of Clube and Napier attracts many people who were once impressed by Velikovsky, such as Leroy Ellenberger, at one time a member of the Velikovsky inner circle and now one of the most outspoken critics of his current followers". Since 1990, Ellenberger has actively promoted Clube and Napier's model, now named "coherent catastrophism", in articles for Skeptic, C&C Review, and Catastrophism and Ancient History, letters to editors, and postcard mailing campaigns to Velikovskians.

== See also ==
- Kronos: A Journal of Interdisciplinary Synthesis
