= List of The New York Times number-one books of 1950 =

This is a list of books that topped The New York Times Best Seller list in 1950.

== Fiction ==
The following list ranks the number-one best-selling fiction books. Henry Morton Robinson's The Cardinal dominated the list for 24 weeks and Ernest Hemingway had his only Number 1 bestseller that year.

Date	Book	Author
January 1	The Egyptian	Mika Waltari
January 8	The Egyptian	Mika Waltari
January 15	The Egyptian	Mika Waltari
January 22	The Egyptian	Mika Waltari
January 29	The Egyptian	Mika Waltari
February 5	The Egyptian	Mika Waltari
February 12	The Egyptian	Mika Waltari
February 19	The Parasites	Daphne du Maurier
February 26	The Parasites	Daphne du Maurier
March 5	The Parasites	Daphne du Maurier
March 12	The Parasites	Daphne du Maurier
March 19	The Parasites	Daphne du Maurier
March 26	The Wall	John Hersey
April 2	The Wall	John Hersey
April 9	The Wall	John Hersey
April 16	The Wall	John Hersey
April 23	The Wall	John Hersey
April 30	The Cardinal	Henry Morton Robinson
May 7	The Cardinal	Henry Morton Robinson
May 14	The Cardinal	Henry Morton Robinson
May 21	The Cardinal	Henry Morton Robinson
May 28	The Cardinal	Henry Morton Robinson
June 4	The Cardinal	Henry Morton Robinson
June 11	The Cardinal	Henry Morton Robinson
June 18	The Cardinal	Henry Morton Robinson
June 25	The Cardinal	Henry Morton Robinson
July 2	The Cardinal	Henry Morton Robinson
July 9	The Cardinal	Henry Morton Robinson
July 16	The Cardinal	Henry Morton Robinson
July 23	The Cardinal	Henry Morton Robinson
July 30	The Cardinal	Henry Morton Robinson
August 6	The Cardinal	Henry Morton Robinson
August 13	The Cardinal	Henry Morton Robinson
August 20	The Cardinal	Henry Morton Robinson
August 27	The Cardinal	Henry Morton Robinson
September 3	The Cardinal	Henry Morton Robinson
September 10	The Cardinal	Henry Morton Robinson
September 17	The Cardinal	Henry Morton Robinson
September 24	The Cardinal	Henry Morton Robinson
October 1	The Cardinal	Henry Morton Robinson
October 8	The Cardinal	Henry Morton Robinson
October 15	Across the River and into the Trees	Ernest Hemingway
October 22	Across the River and into the Trees	Ernest Hemingway
October 29	Across the River and into the Trees	Ernest Hemingway
November 5	Across the River and into the Trees	Ernest Hemingway
November 12	Across the River and into the Trees	Ernest Hemingway
November 19	Across the River and into the Trees	Ernest Hemingway
November 26	Across the River and into the Trees	Ernest Hemingway
December 3	The Disenchanted	Budd Schulberg
December 10	The Disenchanted	Budd Schulberg
December 17	The Disenchanted	Budd Schulberg
December 24	The Disenchanted	Budd Schulberg
December 31	The Disenchanted	Budd Schulberg

== Nonfiction ==
The following list ranks the number-one best-selling nonfiction books.

Date	Book	Author
January 1	White Collar Zoo	Clare Barnes Jr.
January 8	White Collar Zoo	Clare Barnes Jr.
January 15	This I Remember	Eleanor Roosevelt
January 22	This I Remember	Eleanor Roosevelt
January 29	This I Remember	Eleanor Roosevelt
February 5	This I Remember	Eleanor Roosevelt
February 12	This I Remember	Eleanor Roosevelt
February 19	This I Remember	Eleanor Roosevelt
February 26	This I Remember	Eleanor Roosevelt
March 5	The Mature Mind	Harry Allen Overstreet
March 12	The Mature Mind	Harry Allen Overstreet
March 19	The Mature Mind	Harry Allen Overstreet
March 26	The Mature Mind	Harry Allen Overstreet
April 2	The Mature Mind	Harry Allen Overstreet
April 9	The Mature Mind	Harry Allen Overstreet
April 16	The Mature Mind	Harry Allen Overstreet
April 23	The Mature Mind	Harry Allen Overstreet
April 30	The Mature Mind	Harry Allen Overstreet
May 7	Worlds in Collision	Immanuel Velikovsky
May 14	Worlds in Collision	Immanuel Velikovsky
May 21	Worlds in Collision	Immanuel Velikovsky
May 28	Worlds in Collision	Immanuel Velikovsky
June 4	Worlds in Collision	Immanuel Velikovsky
June 11	Worlds in Collision	Immanuel Velikovsky
June 18	Worlds in Collision	Immanuel Velikovsky
June 25	Worlds in Collision	Immanuel Velikovsky
July 2	Worlds in Collision	Immanuel Velikovsky
July 9	Roosevelt in Retrospect	John Gunther
July 16	Worlds in Collision	Immanuel Velikovsky
July 23	Roosevelt in Retrospect	John Gunther
July 30	Roosevelt in Retrospect	John Gunther
August 6	Roosevelt in Retrospect	John Gunther
August 13	Roosevelt in Retrospect	John Gunther
August 20	Worlds in Collision	Immanuel Velikovsky
August 27	Courtroom	Quentin Reynolds
September 3	The Little Princesses	Marion Crawford
September 10	Courtroom	Quentin Reynolds
September 17	Courtroom	Quentin Reynolds
September 24	The Little Princesses	Marion Crawford
October 1	Courtroom	Quentin Reynolds
October 8	Kon-Tiki	Thor Heyerdahl
October 15	Look Younger, Live Longer	Gayelord Hauser
October 22	Kon-Tiki	Thor Heyerdahl
October 29	Kon-Tiki	Thor Heyerdahl
November 5	Kon-Tiki	Thor Heyerdahl
November 12	Kon-Tiki	Thor Heyerdahl
November 19	Kon-Tiki	Thor Heyerdahl
November 26	Kon-Tiki	Thor Heyerdahl
December 3	Kon-Tiki	Thor Heyerdahl
December 10	Kon-Tiki	Thor Heyerdahl
December 17	Kon-Tiki	Thor Heyerdahl
December 24	Kon-Tiki	Thor Heyerdahl
December 31	Kon-Tiki	Thor Heyerdahl

== See also ==
- Publishers Weekly list of bestselling novels in the United States in the 1950s
