= Gunnar Heinsohn =

German author, sociologist and economist (1943–2023)

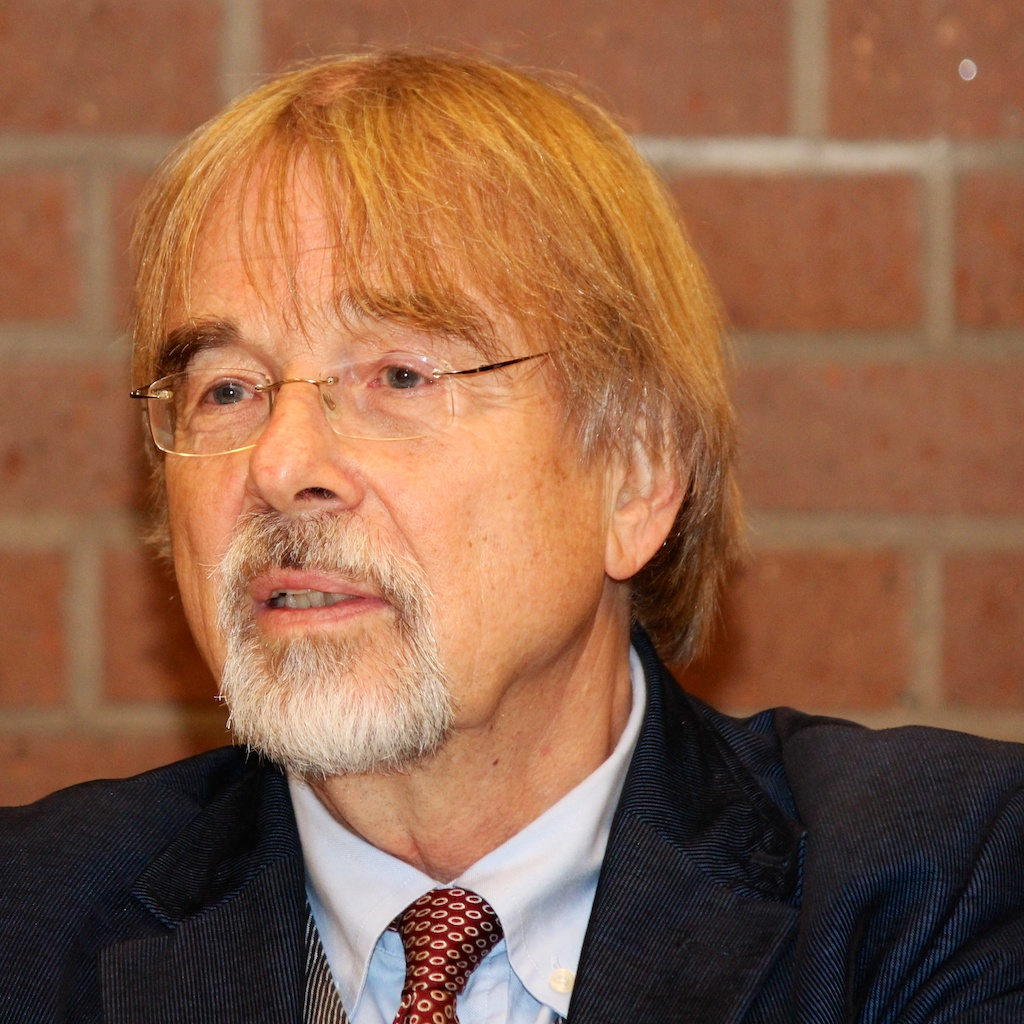
- Heinsohn in 2013
- Born: 21 November 1943; Gotenhafen, Reichsgau Danzig-West Prussia, Germany (now Gdynia, Poland)
- Died: 16 February 2023 (aged 79); Gdańsk, Poland
- Occupations: Professor emeritus in Bremen; author; publisher

Academic work
- Discipline: Economics; social pedagogy
- Main interests: Demographics; youth bulge; economics; property premium; money theory

Gunnar Heinsohn (21 November 1943 – 16 February 2023) was a German author, sociologist and economist and professor emeritus at the University of Bremen where he had a chair in social pedagogy from 1984.

Heinsohn published on a wide array of topics, starting from economics, demography and its relationship with security policy and genocide, and revisionist chronology theories in the tradition of Immanuel Velikovsky.

== Life and work ==
Heinsohn was born on 21 November 1943 in Gotenhafen (Gdynia), the third son of Kriegsmarine U-boat commander Heinrich "Henry" Heinsohn (1910–1943) and Roswitha Heinsohn, née Maurer (1917–1992). Heinrich Heinsohn was stationed in Gotenhafen and died before his son was born when his submarine U-438 was sunk. In June 1944 the family came to Blankenhagen in Pomerania. In January 1945 they fled to Schashagen, and in 1950 the family moved to Pützchen near Bonn. He attended school in Oberkassel, Bonn and Sankt Peter-Böhl, where he received his Abitur in 1964. He studied from 1964 at Freie Universität Berlin. He graduated 1971 in sociology and gained a 1974 summa cum laude doctorate in social sciences; Heinsohn received a second doctorate in economics in 1982. In 1984, he became professor at the University of Bremen. He founded the Raphael Lemkin institute genocide and xenophoby. The centre was dissolved after Heinsohn retired. He taught at the management centre St. Gallen, at the Hochschule Luzern, and in demographic studies at the Bundesakademie für Sicherheitspolitik in Berlin, and at NATO Defense College in Rome. He wrote various books and articles, was a regular in the media and talk shows and published entries at the Axis of good blog^{[4]} and Schweizer Monat.

Heinsohn died in Gdańsk on 16 February 2023, at age 79.

== Research and publications ==
=== Economics ===
In collaboration with a famous colleague in Bremen, economist Otto Steiger, Heinsohn criticized the "barter paradigm" of money. Instead of money as a medium of exchange to facilitate barter, Heinssohn replaced it with a property based credit theory of money that stresses the indispensable role of secure property titles, contract law and especially contract enforcement, liability and collateral to create secure, transferable debt titles that central banks will accept as collateral for issuing bank notes.

Interest is being explained as a property premium instead. The paradigm provides institutional microfoundations for monetary theories of production developed in the Keynesian tradition. Credit theories of money have existed since mercantilism but have not become the dominating paradigm in monetary theory. Besides promoting their paradigm as an alternative foundation for triggering economic development (much in line with the insights of Hernando de Soto, Tom Bethell and Richard Pipes), Steiger has applied it to an analysis of the eurosystem.

While this approach has similarities with institutional economics, its major differences are (1) a non-universalist, cross-cultural approach that is in line with results from economic anthropology (Marshall Sahlins, Karl Polanyi, Marcel Mauss and others) and strongly doubts on the "homo oeconomicus" concept. It provides instead a specific explanation of various strategies of economic efficiency become functional only in monetary economies based on property and enforceable contracts;. Heinssohn proposes a reconstruction of the connection between property, enforceable contracts, interest, credit/money and the banking system and a possible explanation for technical progress and innovation. The difference in innovativity and progress between the monetary economics of antiquity and modern times is being explained as well. Heinsohn and Steiger's model has been discussed in some post-Keynesian circles, and it has been criticized by Nikolaus K.A. Läufer.

=== Demography ===
Heinssohn used demographic patterns to explain various historic events and tendencies. His work on genocide and antisemitism was strongly influenced by his demographic studies.

==== Youth bulge and lack of fertility ====
In his theory about the "youth bulge", Heinsohn argued that an excess in especially young adult male population predictably leads to social unrest, war and terrorism, as the "third and fourth sons" that find no prestigious positions in their existing societies rationalize their impetus to compete by religion or political ideology. Heinsohn claims that most historical periods of social unrest lacking external triggers (such as rapid climatic changes or other catastrophic changes of the environment) and most genocides can be readily explained as a result of a built up youth bulge, including European colonialism, 20th century Fascism, and ongoing conflicts such as that in Darfur, The Palestinian uprisings in 1987-1993 and 2000 to present, and terrorism.

==== Historical demography ====
Heinsohn discussed the origin of modern European demographic patterns (starting with an intense increase in population growth in early modern times, leading to sub-replacement fertility at the dawn of the 21st century), including an interpretation of the European witch hunts of early modern times as pro-natalist re-population policy of the then dominant Catholic Church after the population losses the black death had caused. This interpretation has received mixed responses. It has been criticized and rejected by German historians Walter Rummel, Günther Jerouschek, Robert Jütte and Gerd Schwerhoff - replies to those criticisms can be found in. A historian of birth control John M. Riddle has expressed agreement.

=== Genocide and antisemitism ===
Heinsohn's contributions to genocide research include an encyclopedia of genocides, a generalized version of youth bulge theory and a new theory of Hitler's motivation for the Holocaust. Heinsohn suggested that Hitler wished to erase—physically, intellectually and spiritually—the meaning and heritage of Judaism and Jewish ethics from Germany and its European allies by literally destroying the Jews as a people. In so far Heinsohn explained the Holocaust: as an attempt by Hitler and his Nazi cohorts to wipe out the memory and the idea of Jewish ethics. He intended to enable Germans as a people to wipe out and conquer other people and lands without being hindered by conscience or ethical norms. Hitler assumed ethical normes were brought into Western civilization on the part of the Jews – and inherited by Christianity.

On the origin of sacrifice and priest kingship in Mesopotamia, Heinsohn suggested an explanatory model based upon a catastrophist view of ancient history and a psychoanalytic interpretation of sacrificial rituals. Heinsohn holds that the Jewish people were the first in occidental history to abolish sacrifice in the name of a general prohibition of killing, thereby providing an example to other religions still practicing sacrifice that this is unnecessary. As the Jewish prophet Hosea stated: "For kindness I desired, and not sacrifice, And a knowledge of God above burnt-offerings.". According to this view that is in some respects similar to a psychoanalytic view, antisemitic hatred has its origins in the feelings of guilt towards the sacrificed human or animal; turning those feelings of self-hatred towards those who do not take part in the ritual of sacrifice allows for continuing with the sacrificial practice. Heinsohn contrasts Jewish abstinence from sacrifice with the Christian belief in Jesus as someone who died for the Christians' sins, which he interprets as a regression to sacrificial practices of prehistory and as a core source of Christian-Jewish controversy.

=== Revision of ancient chronology ===
Heinsohn proposed a revision of ancient chronology. Taking Immanuel Velikovsky's revised chronology as a starting point, Heinsohn went on to criticize Velikovsky's chronology as Biblical fundamentalism, proposing an even more drastic revision that is being disputed in circles of chronological revisionists.

His work on ancient chronology, focusing on his views on the stratigraphic record, resulted in some dramatic conclusions. Heinsohn opined that the currently accepted chronology was entrenched long before the scientific investigation of the past, based on the chronology provided in the Old Testament. He accused 19th century archaeologists of constructing their chronology around Bible synchronisms and of, more or less, following the chronology recorded by Eusebius in the fourth century, who made use of the histories of Egypt and Mesopotamia as well as the Old Testament. According to Heinsohn, bible synchronisms led to pharaohs Menes and Ramesses II being dated to the 4th millennium and the 14th century, respectively. As a result, Heinsohn concluded that they created a "phantom" history of two thousand years. In contrast, Heinsohn interpreted stratigraphic evidence to suggest that Egyptian and Mesopotamian civilizations arose around 1,200 BCE, not 3,200 BCE, as the textbooks say.

Heinsohn's ideas on ancient chronology were introduced to the English-speaking world in the Velikovskian journal Kronos in 1985. They have found support with a small number of writers and academics, most of whom are favorably disposed towards Velikovsky; amongst whom are Professor of Philosophy Lynn E. Rose, Professor of Classics at Bard College William Mullen, Professor of Art History Lewis M. Greenberg, speech writer and long-time observer of the Velikovsky scene Clark Whelton, German author Heribert Illig, and British writer Emmet Sweeney. However, his views have been severely criticized by several students of Velikovsky-inspired ancient chronology revision: Aeon editor Dwardu Cardona, New Zealand researcher Lester Mitcham, University of New Orleans Professor of History William H. Stiebing, Jr., British researcher Anthony Rees and Aeon publisher Ev Cochrane.

In 2016, Heinsohn received the Liberty Award.

== Main publications ==
- Vorschulerziehung und Kapitalismus. Eine soziologische Untersuchung der Ursachen, systemverändernden Möglichkeiten und Verwirklichungsschwierigkeiten von Reformbestrebungen in der Vorschulerziehung des kapitalistischen Deutschland, Frankfurt 1971
- together with Rolf Knieper and Otto Steiger: Menschenproduktion. Allgemeine Bevölkerungstheorie der Neuzeit. Suhrkamp, 1979
- (ed.): Das Kibbutz-Modell. Bestandsaufnahme einer alternativen Wirtschafts- und Lebensform nach sieben Jahrzehnten. Suhrkamp,
- Privateigentum, Patriarchat, Geldwirtschaft, sozialtheoretische Rekonstruktion zur Antike. Suhrkamp, Frankfurt am Main 1984 (suhrkamp taschenbuch wissenschaft 455)
- together with Otto Steiger: Die Vernichtung der weisen Frauen. Beiträge zur Theorie und Geschichte von Bevölkerung und Kindheit. März, Herbsten 1985, 14th edition 2005
- together with Heribert Illig: Wann lebten die Pharaonen? Archäologische und technologische Grundlagen für eine Neuschreibung der Geschichte Ägyptens und der übrigen Welt. Eichborn, Frankfurt 1990.
- The Rise of Blood Sacrifice and Priest-Kingship in Mesopotamia: A "Cosmic Decree?", In Religion. A journal of religion and religions, vol. 22 (1992), p. 309–334
- Warum Auschwitz? Hitlers Plan und die Ratlosigkeit der Nachwelt. Rowohlt, 1995
- Eigentum, Zins und Geld. Ungelöste Rätsel der Wirtschaftswissenschaft. Rowohlt, 1996,
- Post-Genocidal Reconciliation in Rwanda: Are there Lessons from Germany?, Bremen 1997
- together with Otto Steiger: The Euro Debate: A Weak Bank Means a Weak Euro, in: The Wall Street Journal Europe, 1 July 1997
- Lexikon der Völkermorde. Rowohlt, 1998
- What Makes the Holocaust a Uniquely Unique Genocide? (PDF) In: 'Journal of Genocide Research' vol. 2,3 (2000), p. 411–430
- Genocide: Historical Aspects, in: International Encyclopedia of the Social & Behavioral Sciences, Elsevier Science, Amsterdam 2001, p. 6153–6159
- Söhne und Weltmacht. Terror im Aufstieg und Fall der Nationen. Orell Füssli, 2003
- together with Otto Steiger: Eigentumsökonomik. Metropolis, Marburg 2006
- Hitler's Motive for the Holocaust. In: Wolfgang Bialas, Lothar Fritze (eds.): Nazi Ideology and Ethics, Cambridge Scholars Publishing, Cambridge 2014, p 103–126
- Ownership Economics: On the Foundations of Interest, Money, Markets, Business Cycles and Economic Development, Routledge, 2013 (transl. of Eigentum, Zins und Geld by Frank Decker).

== See also ==
- Property premium
