= Ellenberger =

Ellenberger is a surname. Notable people with the surname include:

- C. Leroy Ellenberger (born 1942), American academic
- Gisela Ellenberger (born 1950), German runner
- Irene Ellenberger (born 1946), German architect
- Jake Ellenberger (born 1985), American mixed martial artist
- Jules Ellenberger (1871–1973), Imperial civil servant
- Henri Ellenberger (1905–1993), Canadian psychiatrist, medical historian, and criminologist
- Norm Ellenberger (1932–2015), American basketball coach

== See also ==
- Ellenberger Cottage
