= Charles J. Cazeau =

American geologist and writer

Charles J. Cazeau (1931-1999) was an American geologist and writer.

Cazeau was Professor emeritus of geology for the University at Buffalo. He was a fellow of the Committee for Skeptical Inquiry and a contributor to Skeptical Inquirer.

His book co-authored with Stuart D. Scott Exploring the Unknown: Great Mysteries Reexamined (1979) was a debunking of pseudohistorical and pseudoscientific claims such as ancient astronauts, Bigfoot, Loch Ness Monster and Immanuel Velikovsky's catastrophism.

== Publications ==
- Earthquakes (1975)
- Physical Geology: Principles, Processes and Problems (1976)
- Exploring the Unknown: Great Mysteries Reexamined (1979)
- Science Trivia: From Anteaters to Zeppelins (1986)
- Test Your Science IQ (2000)
