= Ages in Chaos =

Book by Immanuel Velikovsky

- Author: Immanuel Velikovsky
- Publication date: 1952
- ISBN: 9780385033893

Ages in Chaos is a book by the author Immanuel Velikovsky, first published by Doubleday in 1952, which put forward a major revision of the history of the Ancient Near East, claiming that the histories of Ancient Egypt and the Israelites are five centuries out of step. He followed this with a number of other works where he attempted to complete his reconstruction of ancient history, collectively known as the Ages in Chaos series.

Velikovsky's work has been harshly criticised, including by some fellow chronological revisionists.

== Summary ==
Velikovsky had put forward his ideas briefly in Theses for the Reconstruction of Ancient History in 1945, where he claimed that the history of the ancient Near East down to the time of Alexander the Great is garbled, but Ages in Chaos was his first full-length work on the subject.

His starting point for the first volume of the series was that the Exodus took place not, as orthodoxy has it, at some point during the Egyptian New Kingdom, but at the fall of the Middle Kingdom. In this and later volumes, he made heavy use of the concept of "ghost doubles" or alter-egos: historical figures who were known by different names in two different sources (e.g. Egyptian and Greek) and were considered to be entirely different people living in different centuries, but who he proposed to be actually erroneously dated accounts of the same individuals and events.

First he claimed that the Ipuwer Papyrus came from the beginning of Egypt's Second Intermediate Period, and that this was an Egyptian account of the Plagues of Egypt. He then identified Tutimaios as the Pharaoh of the Exodus (much earlier than any of the mainstream candidates), the Hyksos with the biblical Amalekites, the Egyptian Pharaoh Hatshepsut with the Biblical Queen of Sheba, the land of Punt with Solomon's kingdom, and Pharaoh Thutmose III with the Biblical King Shishak. He claimed that the Egyptian Amarna letters from the late 18th Dynasty describe events from the Kingdom of Israel and Judah, from roughly the time of King Ahab.

== Later works on ancient history ==
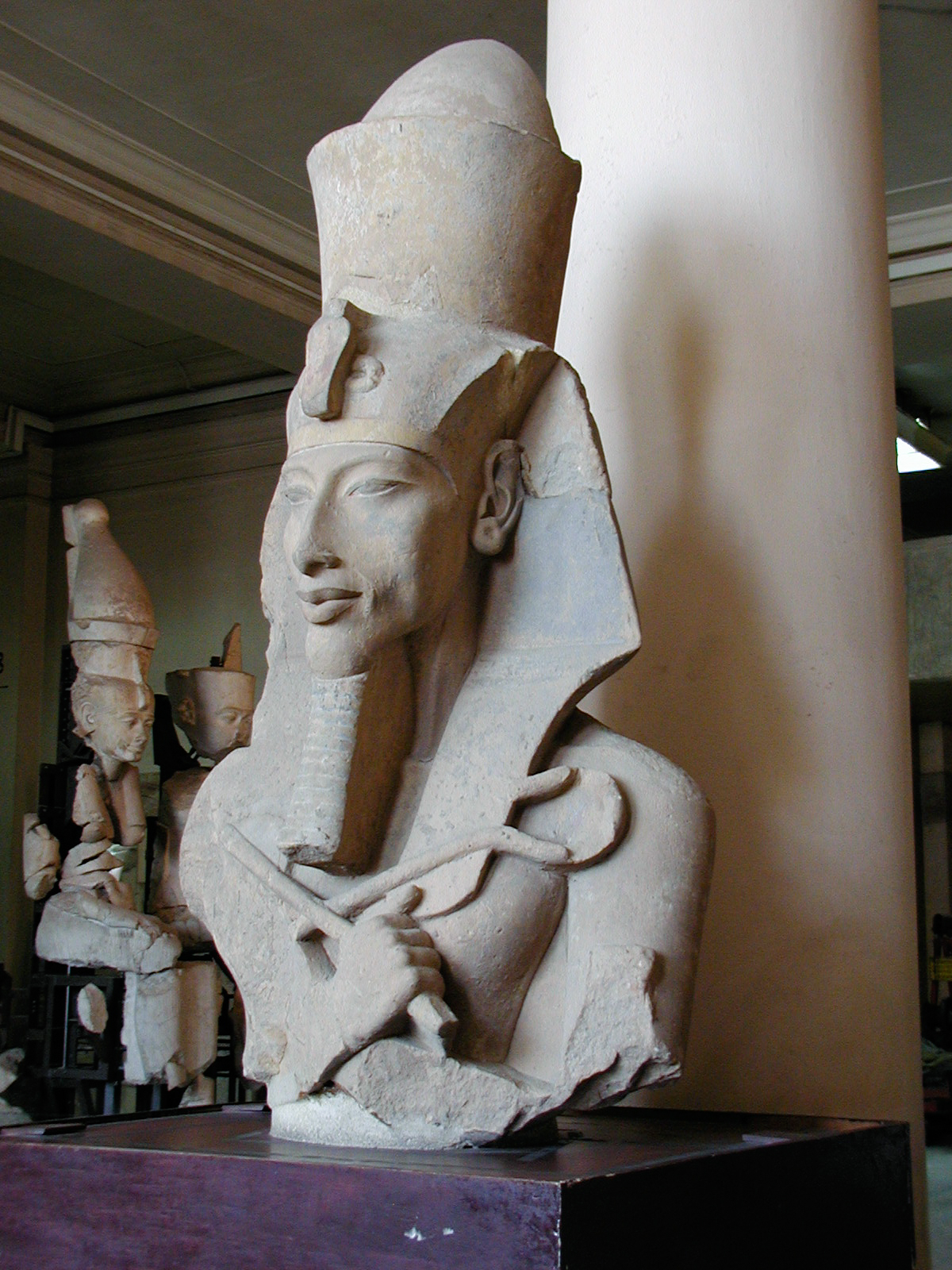
Akhnaton

A second volume was due for publication shortly after this but was postponed. Instead it was followed in 1960 by Oedipus and Akhnaton, where he claimed that the story of the Pharaoh Akhenaten was the origin of the Greek legend of Oedipus, and that Amenophis III was Laius, and Tutankhamun was Eteocles.

In the last two years of his life Velikovsky published a further two volumes of the series. In Peoples of the Sea he dealt with the final period of his reconstruction, the Persian invasions of Egypt. Manetho's 20th dynasty here becomes identified with the dynasties which ruled a newly independent Egypt in the early 4th century BCE, and Nectanebo I is a ghost double of Rameses III. Rameses III fought invasions by the Sea Peoples, including the "Peleset", conventionally identified with the Philistines. According to Velikovsky, the "Peleset" are the Persians and the other Sea Peoples are their Greek mercenaries. The 21st dynasty then became a line of priest-kings who ruled in the oases simultaneously with the Persians.

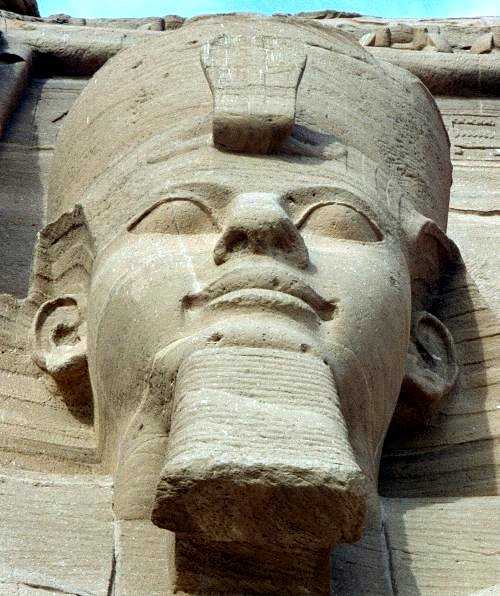
Ramses II

In Ramses II and His Time Velikovsky identified each of the major 19th dynasty pharaohs with a corresponding pharaoh of the 26th dynasty. Thus, Ramses I was an alter-ego of Necho I, Seti I of Psamtik I, Ramses II of Necho II, and Merneptah of Apries. In order to make these identifications work, Velikovsky claimed that the Hittite Empire was an invention of modern historians, and the supposedly Hittite archaeological remains in modern Turkey were actually Chaldean, i.e. Neo-Babylonian. The Hittite kings are held to be ghost doubles of the Neo-Babylonian kings, and Rameses II's battle with the Hittites at Kadesh is identical to Necho's fight against Nebuchadrezzar II at Carchemish, Nabopolassar is Mursili II, Neriglissar is Muwatalli, Labashi-Marduk is Urhi-Teshup, and Nebuchadrezzar II is Hattusili III.

At the time of his death he considered that completing his reconstruction of ancient history would require a further two volumes: The Assyrian Conquest and The Dark Age of Greece; these were never published in print in English, but online versions are available at the Velikovsky archive. In the former work, Velikovsky separated the 18th and 19th dynasties, specifically arguing that over a century separated Ay and Horemheb, conventionally regarded as his successor. Instead, he had the 22nd through 25th dynasties follow upon the earlier part of the 18th, leading down to the Assyrian invasions of the early 7th century BCE. The "great king" who crowned Horemheb was the Assyrian king.

The books have remained popular. The British publisher Sidgwick & Jackson reprinted Ages in Chaos ten times between 1953 and 1977, and Paradigma reprinted it as recently as 2009.

== Controversy and criticism ==
The revised chronology proposed by Ages in Chaos has been rejected by nearly all mainstream historians and Egyptologists. It was claimed, starting with early reviewers, that Velikovsky's usage of material for proof is often very selective. In 1965 the leading cuneiformist Abraham Sachs, in a forum at Brown University, discredited Velikovsky's use of Mesopotamian cuneiform sources. Velikovsky never refuted Sachs' attack.

In 1984 fringe science expert Henry H. Bauer wrote Beyond Velikovsky: The History of a Public Controversy, which Time described as "the definitive treatise debunking Immanuel Velikovsky". Bauer accused Velikovsky of dogmatically asserting his own point of view to be correct, where at best this is only one possible interpretation of the historical material in question, and gives several examples from Ages in Chaos.

In 1984 Egyptologist David Lorton produced a detailed critique of chapter 3 of Ages in Chaos, which identifies Hatshepsut with the Queen of Sheba, e.g. accusing Velikovsky of mistakes that he would have avoided if he had a basic knowledge of the languages of the ancient near east.

In 1978, following the much-postponed publication of further volumes in Velikovsky's Ages in Chaos series, the United Kingdom-based Society for Interdisciplinary Studies organised a conference in Glasgow specifically to debate the revised chronology. The ultimate conclusion of this work, by scholars including Peter James, John Bimson, Geoffrey Gammonn, and David Rohl, was that this particular revision of chronology was untenable, although they considered that the work had highlighted problems with the orthodox chronology.

David Rohl, one of those involved in the 1978 Glasgow conference, has developed his own revised chronology. While he agrees that the Exodus should be dated to the collapse of the Middle Kingdom, and that Tutimaios is the Pharaoh of the Exodus, there are few points of contact between the Velikovsky and Rohl chronologies, largely because of the different methodologies used to resolve the later periods.

James, another Glasgow delegate who went on to publish a work challenging the concept of a widespread dark age at the end of the Bronze Age, credited Velikovsky with "point[ing] the way to a solution by challenging Egyptian chronology", but criticised Velikovsky's chronology as "disastrously extreme", producing "a rash of new problems far more severe than those it hoped to solve" and noted that "Velikovsky understood little of archaeology and nothing of stratigraphy".

One important disagreement is that Rohl and James consider that the chronology of the ancient Near East becomes fixed by the conquests of the Assyrians in the 7th century BCE. Velikovsky carried his revisionism into the Late Period of ancient Egypt, and considered that chronology only becomes fixed by the conquests of Alexander the Great in the 4th century BCE. They have also rejected some of Velikovsky's more extreme claims e.g. non-existence of Hittite Empire, changing the order of some Egyptian dynasties. Rohl and James's views remain controversial and are not accepted by most historians.

== Legacy ==
In spite of the hostility of mainstream historians, Velikovsky's revisionism continues to attract adherents. Following his death in 1979 Velikovsky's theories were championed by Lynn E. Rose, Professor Emeritus of Philosophy at Buffalo. After Rose's death in 2013 the torch passed to a small group of disciples, among whom the most vocal and active are Charles Ginenthal and Emmet Sweeney. Ginenthal is the founder and principal contributor to an online journal The Velikovskian. He has also authored a series of revisionist works under the title Pillars of the Past. Emmet Sweeney has published his chronological revisions in a series of works entitled Ages in Alignment.

These scholars believe that Velikovsky did not go far enough. Under the influence of Gunnar Heinsohn they have shortened Velikovsky's timeline of ancient history even more. The 12th Dynasty of ancient Egypt has been moved almost 1500 years closer to the present, ending with Alexander the Great's invasion in 331 BCE. The Exodus has been redated to the 8th century, and the 18th Dynasty has been moved to the 8th–7th centuries. 274 years have been removed from the history of the Israelites. The Hittite Empire, which Velikovsky identified with the Neo-Babylonian Empire, has been identified with the Lydian Kingdom, while the Neo-Babylonians are now regarded as vassal kings of Babylon under the Macedonian Seleucids. The Neo-Assyrian Empire is now equated with the Persian Empire in northern Assyria and has been redated accordingly. In truth, very little of Velikovsky's chronology has been left untouched.

Little if any of these authors' work has been endorsed by mainstream historians.

== Bibliography ==
- Bauer, Henry H. (1999). Beyond Velikovsky. University of Illinois Press. ISBN 0-252-06845-9.
- James, Peter; Thorpe, I. J.; et al. (1991). Centuries of Darkness. London: Jonathan Cape. ISBN 0-224-02647-X.
- Rohl, David (1995). A Test of Time. London: Century. ISBN 978-0-7126-5913-0.
- Velikovsky, Immanuel (1977) [1953]. Ages in Chaos. London: Sidgwick and Jackson. ISBN -0-283-35257-4.
