= Worlds in Collision =

1950 book by Immanuel Velikovsky

- First UK edition (publ. Gollancz)
- Author: Immanuel Velikovsky
- Language: English
- Subject: Mythology, Pseudoastronomy
- Publisher: Macmillan (initial); Doubleday
- Publication date: April 3, 1950
- Publication place: United States

Worlds in Collision is a book by Immanuel Velikovsky published in 1950. The book postulates that around the 15th century BC, the planet Venus was ejected from Jupiter as a comet or comet-like object and passed near Earth (an actual collision is not mentioned). The object allegedly changed Earth's orbit and axis, causing innumerable catastrophes that are mentioned in early mythologies and religions from around the world. The book has been heavily criticized as a work of pseudoscience and catastrophism, and many of its claims are completely rejected by the established scientific community as they are not supported by any available evidence.

== Publication ==
Worlds in Collision was first published on April 3, 1950, by Macmillan Publishers. Macmillan's interest in publishing it was encouraged by the knowledge that Velikovsky had obtained a promise from Gordon Atwater, Director of the Hayden Planetarium, for a sky show based on the book when it was published. The book, Velikovsky's most criticized and controversial, was an instant New York Times bestseller, topping the charts for eleven weeks while being in the top ten for 27 straight weeks. Despite this popularity, overwhelming rejection of its thesis by the scientific community forced Macmillan to stop publishing it and to transfer the book to Doubleday within two months.

== Core ideas ==
In the book's preface, Velikovsky summarizes his arguments:

Worlds in Collision is a book of wars in the celestial sphere that took place in historical times. In these wars the planet Earth participated too. [...] The historical-cosmological story of this book is based in the evidence of historical texts of many people around the globe, on classical literature, on epics of the northern races, on sacred books of the peoples of the Orient and Occident, on traditions and folklore of primitive peoples, on old astronomical inscriptions and charts, on archaeological finds, and also on geological and paleontological material.

The book proposes that Venus formed inside of Jupiter, and that around the 15th century BCE, it was ejected from Jupiter as a comet or comet-like object and subsequently passed near Earth, though an actual collision with the Earth is not mentioned. In doing so it changed Earth's orbit and axial inclination, causing innumerable catastrophes which were identified in early mythologies and religious traditions from human civilizations around the world. Fifty-two years later, it again made a close approach, stopping the Earth's rotation for a while and causing more catastrophes. Then, in the 8th and 7th centuries BCE, Mars (itself displaced by Venus) made close approaches to the Earth; this incident caused a new round of disturbances and disasters. After that, the current "celestial order" was established. The courses of the planets stabilized over the centuries and Venus gradually became a "normal" planet.

These events led to several key statements:

1. Venus must be still very hot as young planets radiate heat.
2. Venus must be rich in petroleum and hydrocarbon gases.
3. Venus has an abnormal orbit in consequence of the unusual disasters stemming from its planetary origins.

Velikovsky suggested some additional ideas that he said derived from these claims, including:

1. Jupiter emits radio noises.
2. The magnetosphere of the Earth reaches at least up to the Moon.
3. The Sun has an electric potential of approximately 10^{19} volts.
4. The rotation of the Earth can be affected by electromagnetic fields.

Velikovsky arrived at these proposals using a methodology which would today be called comparative mythology—he looked for concordances in the myths and written histories of unconnected cultures across the world, following a literal reading of their accounts of the exploits of planetary deities. He argues on the basis of ancient cosmological myths from places as disparate as India and China, Greece and Rome, Assyria and Sumer. For example, ancient Greek mythology asserts that the goddess Athena sprang from the head of Zeus. Velikovsky identifies Zeus (whose Roman counterpart was the god Jupiter) with the planet Jupiter and Athena (the Roman Minerva) with the planet Venus. This myth, along with others from ancient Egypt, Israel, Mexico, etc. are used to support the claim that "Venus was expelled as a comet and then changed to a planet after contact with a number of members of our solar system" (Velikovsky 1972:182).

== Critical reaction ==
=== Contemporary reactions ===
The plausibility of the theory was summarily rejected by the physics community, as the cosmic chain of events proposed by Velikovsky contradicts basic laws of physics. Velikovsky's ideas had been known to astronomers for years before the publication of the book, partially by his writing to astronomer Harlow Shapley of Harvard, partially through his 1946 pamphlet Cosmos Without Gravitation, and partially by a preview of his work in an article in the August 11, 1946, edition of the New York Herald Tribune. An article about the upcoming book was published by Harper's Magazine in January 1950, which was followed by additional articles in Newsweek (Bauer 1984:3–4) and Reader's Digest in March 1950.

Shapley, along with others such as astronomer Cecilia Payne-Gaposchkin (also at Harvard), instigated a campaign against the book before its publication. Initially, they were highly critical of a publisher as reputable as Macmillan publishing such a pseudoscientific book, even as a trade book. Their disapproval was re-invigorated when Macmillan included Worlds in Collision among other trade books of possible interest to professors listed under the category "Science" in the back of a textbook catalog mailed to college professors. Within two months of the book's initial release, the publishing of the book was transferred to Doubleday, which has no textbook division.

The fundamental criticism against the book from the astronomy community was that its celestial mechanics were irreconcilable with Newtonian mechanics, requiring planetary orbits which could not be made to conform to the laws of conservation of energy and conservation of angular momentum (Bauer 1984:70). Velikovsky conceded that the behavior of the planets in his theories is not consistent with Newton's laws of motion and universal gravitation. He proposed that electromagnetic forces could be the cause of the movements of the planets, although such forces between astronomical bodies are known to be essentially zero.

Velikovsky tried to protect himself from criticism of his proposed celestial mechanics by removing the original Appendix on the subject from Worlds in Collision, hoping that the merit of his ideas would be evaluated on the basis of his comparative mythology and use of literary sources alone. This strategy did not protect him: the Appendix was an expanded version of the Cosmos Without Gravitation monograph, which he had already distributed to Shapley and others in the late 1940s—and they had regarded the physics within it as egregiously in error.

=== Carl Sagan ===
In his 1979 science book Broca's Brain: Reflections on the Romance of Science, astronomer Carl Sagan wrote that the high surface temperature of Venus was known of prior to the publication of Worlds in Collision, and that Velikovsky misunderstood the mechanism for this heat. Velikovsky believed that Venus was heated by its close encounter with the Earth and Mars. He also did not understand the greenhouse effect caused by Venus's atmosphere, which had earlier been elucidated by astronomer Rupert Wildt. Ultimately, Venus is hot due to its proximity to the Sun; it does not emit more heat than it receives from the Sun, and any heat produced by its celestial movements would have long since dissipated. Sagan concludes: "(1) the temperature in question was never specified [by Velikovsky]; (2) the mechanism proposed for providing this temperature is grossly inadequate; (3) the surface of the planet does not cool off with time as advertised; and (4) the idea of a high surface temperature on Venus was published in the dominant astronomical journal of its time and with an essentially correct argument ten years before the publication of Worlds in Collision" (p. 118).

Sagan also noted that "Velikovsky's idea that the clouds of Venus are composed of hydrocarbons or carbohydrates is neither original nor correct." Sagan notes that the presence of hydrocarbon gases (such as petroleum gases) on Venus was earlier suggested, and abandoned, again by Rupert Wildt, whose work is not credited by Velikovsky. Also, the 1962 Mariner 2 probe was erroneously reported in the popular press to have discovered hydrocarbons on Venus. These errors were subsequently corrected, and Sagan later concluded that "[n]either Mariner 2 nor any subsequent investigation of the Venus atmosphere has found evidence for hydrocarbons or carbohydrates" (p. 113).

Regarding Jupiter's radio emissions, Sagan noted that "all objects give off radio waves if they are at temperatures above absolute zero. The essential characteristics of the Jovian radio emission—that it is nonthermal, polarized, intermittent radiation, connected with the vast belts of charged particles which surround Jupiter, trapped by its strong magnetic field—are nowhere predicted by Velikovsky. Further, his 'prediction' is clearly not linked in its essentials to the fundamental Velikovskian theses. Merely guessing something right does not necessarily demonstrate prior knowledge or a correct theory." Sagan concluded that "there is not one case where [Velikovsky's] ideas are simultaneously original and consistent with simple physical theory and observation."

He also noted that it was Athena and not Venus who was born from the head of Zeus—two utterly different goddesses. Athena was never identified with a planet.

=== Later reactions ===
Tim Callahan, religion editor of Skeptic, presses the case further in claiming that the composition of the atmosphere of Venus is a complete disproof of Worlds in Collision. "...Velikovsky's hypothesis stands or falls on Venus having a reducing atmosphere made up mainly of hydrocarbons. In fact, the atmosphere of Venus is made up mainly of carbon dioxide—carbon in its oxidized form—along with clouds of sulfuric acid. Therefore, it couldn't have carried such an atmosphere with it out of Jupiter and it couldn't be the source of hydrocarbons to react with oxygen in our atmosphere to produce carbohydrates. Velikovsky's hypothesis is falsified by the carbon dioxide atmosphere of Venus."

Astronomer Philip Plait has pointed out that Velikovsky's hypothesis is also falsified by the presence of the Moon with its nearly circular orbit, for which the length of the month has not changed sensibly in the more than 2,000 years the Hebrew calendar has been in use. "If Venus were to get so close to the Earth that it could actually exchange atmospheric contents [i.e., closer than 1,000 kilometers (620 mi) from the surface of the Earth]," as Velikovsky claimed, ". . . the Moon would have literally been flung into interplanetary space. At the very least its orbit would have been profoundly changed, made tremendously elliptical... Had Venus done any of the things Velikovsky claimed, the Moon's orbit would have changed."

== Controversy ==
By 1974, the controversy surrounding Velikovsky's work had reached the point where the American Association for the Advancement of Science felt obliged to address the situation, as it had done in relation to UFOs, and devoted a scientific meeting to Velikovsky. The meeting featured, among others, Velikovsky himself and Carl Sagan. Sagan gave a critique of Velikovsky's ideas and attacked most of the assumptions made in Worlds in Collision. His criticism is published in Scientists Confront Velikovsky (Ithaca, New York, 1977), edited by Donald Goldsmith, and presented in a revised and corrected version in his book Broca's Brain: Reflections on the Romance of Science and is much longer than that given in the talk. Sagan further critiqued Velikovsky's ideas in his PBS television series Cosmos. In Cosmos, Sagan also criticizes the scientific community for their attitude toward Velikovsky, stating that while science is a process in which all ideas are subject to a process of extensive scrutiny before any idea can be accepted as fact, the attempt by some scientists to suppress outright Velikovsky's ideas was "the worst aspect of the Velikovsky affair."

In November 1974, at the Biennial Meeting of the Philosophy of Science Association held at the University of Notre Dame, Michael W. Friedlander, professor of physics at Washington University in St. Louis, confronted Velikovsky in the symposium "Velikovsky and the Politics of Science" with examples of his "substandard scholarship" involving the "distortion of the published scientific literature in quotations that he used to support his theses". For example, contrary to Velikovsky, R.A. Lyttleton did not write "the terrestrial planets, Venus included, must have originated from the giant planets…" Rather, Lyttleton wrote "…it is even possible…" As Friedlander recounts, "When I gave each example, [Velikovsky's] response was 'Where did I write that?'; when I showed a photo copy of the quoted pages, he simply switched to a different topic."

A thorough examination of the original material cited in Velikovsky's publications, and a severe criticism of its use, was published by Bob Forrest. Earlier in 1974, James Fitton published a brief critique of Velikovsky's interpretation of myth, drawing on the section "The World Ages" and the later interpretation of the Trojan War, that was ignored by Velikovsky and his defenders whose indictment began: "In at least three important ways Velikovsky's use of mythology is unsound. The first of these is his proclivity to treat all myths as having independent value; the second is the tendency to treat only such material as is consistent with his thesis; and the third is his very unsystematic method." A short analysis of the position of arguments in the late 20th century was given by Velikovsky's ex-associate C. Leroy Ellenberger, a former senior editor of Kronos (a journal to promote Velikovsky's ideas) (Bauer 1995:11), in his essay. Almost ten years later, Ellenberger criticized some Velikovskian and neo-Velikovskian qua "Saturnist" ideas in an invited essay.

The storm of controversy that was created by Velikovsky's works, especially Worlds in Collision, may have helped revive the Catastrophist movements in the last half of the 20th century; it is also held by some working in the field that progress has actually been retarded by the negative aspects of the so-called Velikovsky Affair. The assessment of Velikovsky's work by tree-ring expert Mike Baillie is instructive: "But fundamentally, Velikovsky did not understand anything about comets … As if to comfort his readers, at one point he says that no planet at present has a course which poses a danger to this planet: '…only a few asteroids—mere rocks, a few kilometres in diameter—have orbits which cross the path of the earth.' … He did not know about the hazard posed by relatively small objects, and, just in case there is any doubt about his mistake, he repeats the notion by noting that a possibility exists of some future collision between planets, 'not a mere encounter between a planet and an asteroid'. This failure to recognize the power of comets and asteroids means that it is reasonable to go back to Velikovsky and delete all the physically impossible text about Venus and Mars passing close to the earth."

More recently, the absence of supporting material in ice core studies (such as the Greenland Dye-3 and Vostok cores), bristlecone pine tree ring data, Swedish clay varves, and many hundreds of cores taken from ocean and lake sediments from all over the world has ruled out any basis for the proposition of a global catastrophe of the proposed dimension within the Late Holocene age. Also, the fossils, geological deposits, and landforms in Earth in Upheaval, which Velikovsky regards as corroborating the hypothesis presented in Worlds in Collision have been, since their publication, explained in terms of mundane non-catastrophic geologic processes. So far, the only piece of the geologic evidence which has shown to have a catastrophic origin is a "raised beach" containing coral-bearing conglomerates found at an elevation of 1,200 feet above sea level within the Hawaiian Islands. The sediments, which were misidentified as a "raise beach", are now attributed to megatsunamis generated by massive landslides created by the periodic collapse of the sides of the islands. In addition, these conglomerates, as many of the items cited as evidence for his ideas in Earth in Upheaval, are far too old to be used as valid evidence supporting the hypothesis presented in Worlds in Collision.

== See also ==
- Ages in Chaos – Book by Immanuel Velikovsky
- Catastrophism – Geological theory of abrupt, severe change
- Celestial mechanics – Branch of astronomy
- Comparative mythology – Comparison of myths from different cultures
- List of topics characterized as pseudoscience
- Plasma cosmology – Non-standard model of the universe; emphasizes the role of ionized gases
- Ragnarok: The Age of Fire and Gravel – Book by Ignatius Donnelly
- Theia (planet) – Ancient planet that collided with Earth
- William Comyns Beaumont – British journalist, writer and editor
