= Property premium =

Property premium is the key concept in the system of property-based economics developed by Gunnar Heinsohn, Otto Steiger, and Hans-Joachim Stadermann. It is an insight derived from the legal distinction between property and possession which is made by jurists, but not by economists.
The distinction between property and possession is used by Heinsohn and Steiger to classify forms of society. "Three distinctive systems of material reproduction are known to man: (i) custom or tribal societies, (ii) command or feudal societies and (iii) ownership- or property-based societies." The first two are based on possession, which is a physical, material concept. Property, on the other hand, is an abstract, intangible concept, and thus can only exist as a creation of law and within the realm established by the rule of law. Where such a regime of law is established, property arises; and it is accompanied by the phenomenon of property premium. "As soon as property is created it carries an unearned and immaterial premium, the property premium. This premium exists in addition to the physical use of goods or resources in their possessional state and consists of two powers: (i) its capacity of backing the issue of money which can be created only in a credit contract and (ii) its eligibility to serve as collateral for obtaining credit."
It is this property premium which explains the phenomenon of interest. The owner gives up his property premium by using his property to back the issue of that money; what he gains in exchange is interest. The borrower likewise forgoes property premium in engaging a loan, because he must back his promise of repayment with collateral, pledging his property as security for repayment of the loan. What he receives in return is liquidity premium, which is the capacity to cancel indebtedness. "Keynes's idea that interest is the payment for forgoing liquidity premium, therefore, falls short. The debtor's payment of interest materializes the creditor's property premium, while the debtor's property premium gives rise to liquidity premium."

This ingenious explanation for the existence of interest also demonstrates that interest is simply an aspect of property within the regime of private law. Within that regime it is inescapable; outside of it, in possession-oriented regimes whether tribal or communist, it is unobtainable.
