= Pensée (Immanuel Velikovsky Reconsidered) =

Pensée: Immanuel Velikovsky Reconsidered
- School: Lewis and Clark College
- Owner: Student Academic Freedom Forum
- Editor: Stephen L. Talbott
- Campus chief: David N. Talbott
- Founded: 1972
- Circulation: 10,000-20,000

Pensée: Immanuel Velikovsky Reconsidered Vol.VII (Spring 1974) depicting a parody Immanuel Velikovsky by artist Robert Byrd that appeared in Philadelphia Magazine, April, 1968

Pensée: Immanuel Velikovsky Reconsidered ("IVR") was a special series of ten issues of the magazine Pensée advancing the pseudoscientific theories of Immanuel Velikovsky. It was produced to "encourage continuing critical analysis of all questions raised by Velikovsky's work", published between May 1972 and Winter 1974-75 by the Student Academic Freedom Forum, whose president was David N. Talbott, with the assistance and cooperation of Lewis and Clark College, Portland, Oregon. Velikovsky -- "the man whose work was being examined 'objectively'" insinuated himself into the editing of the May 1972 issue, just as he had done earlier for the April 1967 "Velikovsky" issue of Yale Scientific Magazine.

It achieved a circulation of between 10,000 - 20,000, with the first issue reprinted twice totalling 75,000 copies, and resulted in a book, Velikovsky Reconsidered containing selected articles, many of them partisan.

== History ==
In the final issue of Pensée IVR, the publisher recalled that the original magazine was:

Founded in 1966 and soon thereafter allowed to lapse for several years, it was revived in 1970 as an unofficial student magazine distributed on Oregon campuses [..] Late in 1971 the editor and publisher, personally familiar with the work of Immanuel Velikovsky, conceived the idea of finding someone qualified to write a major article describing Velikovsky's theories, their implications, and their reception. Subsequent contact, first, with Velikovsky himself, and then with several persons knowledgeable about his work, led to the May, 1972 issue of Pensée.

Science magazine attributed the then increased support for Velikovsky's ideas, to Pensée.

== Staff ==
The staff consisted of publisher David N. Talbott and his brother Stephen L. Talbott as editor, and built up to five associate editors: Lewis M. Greenberg, Ralph Juergens, William Mullen, C.J. Ransom, and Lynn E. Rose. Professor of Social Theory, Alfred de Grazia noted that:

... there came Pensée, a production of the young Talbott brothers, Stephen and David, whose enthusiasm for his [Velikovsky's] work crystallized into a conversion of their small magazine on human rights into a forum on the Velikovsky Affair, at least for ten issues. Stephen Talbott was a brilliant editor and organizer, bent upon opening the world to quantavolutionary ideas, but also to criticism of them. After spectacular successes, Pensée collapsed under a load of debt and overwork. As it was ending, it promised to broaden its interests beyond Velikovsky and to discuss ideas irreconcilable with his. Velikovsky would have no part of this, and several of his Eastern supporters -- with Lewis Greenberg and Warner Sizemore leading -- issued the first number of Kronos.

== Conferences ==
The "Immanuel Velikovsky Reconsidered" period also included sponsoring two three-day symposia which were attended by Velikovsky. The first ever "Velikovsky Symposium" held 16–18 August 1972, at Lewis and Clark College (who was also co-sponsor) convened 50 invited scholars, many from the ranks of Velikovsky's supporters, with 200 attendees. In June 1974, "Velikovsky and the Recent History of the Solar System" at McMaster University, Hamilton, Ontario, convened 38 invited scholars with a generally higher and non-aligned profile than in 1972, including such mainstream scientists as David Morrison (Univ. of Hawaii), James Warwick (Univ. of Colorado), and Derek York (Univ. of Toronto), and registered over 350 attendees.

== Controversy ==
A number of magazines and journals refused to accept advertisements for Pensée. These included American Scientist; Sky and Telescope; and Scientific American, whose publishers wrote:

We have not encountered a single scientist working in any of the many fields, from archaeology to astrophysics, on which Velikovsky touches who finds any interest whatever in anything he has to say. That is why you have not seen any account of Velikovsky in our pages. . . . The controversy seems to be generated wholly by Velikovsky and his sympathizers. They cry "foul" because he is ignored and attempt to make an academic freedom case of it. The controversy is thus quite secondary. As I see it, the threat to academic freedom comes the other way around: by such tactics the Velikovsky party tries to compel interest by scientists in work in which they can find no interest.

However, many magazines and journals did accept advertisements for Pensée, including the Bulletin of the Atomic Scientists, Science, Science News, and Physics Today.

== Demise ==
At the end of the ten issue Velikovsky feature, the subscribers were informed that "Pensee may not survive the future" in the back of tenth issue while soliciting subscription renewals for up to three years on the inside front cover while the magazine was "seriously encumbered with debts". Publication ceased with the tenth issue and in early 1976 subscribers were informed "Pensée has discontinued publication indefinitely".

Velikovsky himself noted "When Pensée (1972-1974) completed the planned ten issues on the theme 'Velikovsky Reconsidered' I made it clear that I would not continue my cooperation as a regular contributor, not only because of a lack of time, but also because of disagreement with certain aspects of their editorial policy."

== Successor ==
The successor Research Communications Network with Stephen L. Talbott as coordinator, which was "committed to no man and no theory", sent a newsletter to its "more than 16,000 U.S. members" six months later. The Network served as a clearinghouse for developments in and information about catastrophism, with special attention to Robert V. Gentry's radiohalos and David N. Talbott's "Saturn Thesis", as well as offering a book service through its mailings of newsletters and resources fliers. The Network ceased operations in spring 1978 with a single sheet flier announcing a book close-out sale and an offering of Velikovsky's Ramses II and his Time.

== See also ==
- Kronos: A Journal of Interdisciplinary Synthesis (Velikovskian publication)
