= Otto Steiger (economist) =

German economist and professor

Otto Steiger (12 December 1938 – 17 January 2008) was a German economist and professor at the University of Bremen.

== Biography ==
Steiger was born on 12 December 1938 in Dresden. He spent his childhood on his parents' farming estate in Döschütz (a locality of Großweitzschen since 1994), office captaincy of Döbeln, Saxony, which was expropriated immediately after the war.

In Göttingen he attended the Felix Klein Grammar School from 1949 to 1958 and studied economics and economic history at the Free University of Berlin and at the University of Uppsala from 1958 to 1964. In 1973 he became professor of general economic theory with a focus on monetary theory and macroeconomics at the University of Bremen.

Between 1989 and 1992 Steiger has been invited four times as qualified person by the Royal Swedish Academy of Sciences to nominate candidates for the Sveriges Riksbank Prize in Economic Sciences in Memory of Alfred Nobel. In 2006, he was awarded the K. William Kapp Prize by the Kapp Foundation and the European Association for Evolutionary Political Economy. He died on 17 January 2008 in Bremen.

== Writings ==
- Ownership Economics: On the Foundations of Interest, Money, Markets, Business Cycles and Economic Development, Routledge, with Gunnar Heinsohn, 2013.
- Marx and Keynes: Private Property and Money, 1997, with Gunnar Heinsohn
- The Property Foundation of Franchising, 2006.
- Sweden: An Up-to-date Travel Guide, 1999, with Gerhard Lemmer, Birgit Krämer.
- Einen Dieb Fangen, 1995.

== See also ==
- Property premium
