= Broca's Brain =

1979 book by Carl Sagan

Broca's Brain: Reflections on the Romance of Science
- Cover of the first edition
- Author: Carl Sagan
- Language: English
- Subjects: Intellect, brain, space sciences, Paul Broca
- Publisher: Random House
- Publication date: 1979 (1st edition, hardcover)
- Publication place: United States
- Media type: Print (hardcover and paperback)
- Pages: 347 (1st edition, hardcover)
- ISBN: 0-394-50169-1 (1st edition, hardcover)
- OCLC: 4493944
- Dewey Decimal: 128/.2
- LC Class: BF431 .S19
- Preceded by: The Dragons of Eden
- Followed by: Cosmos

Broca's Brain: Reflections on the Romance of Science is a 1979 book by the astrophysicist Carl Sagan. Its chapters were originally articles published between 1974 and 1979 in various magazines, including The Atlantic Monthly, The New Republic, Physics Today, Playboy, and Scientific American. In the introduction, Sagan wrote:

As long as there have been human beings, we have posed the deep and fundamental questions. ... If we do not destroy ourselves, most of us will be around for the answers. ... By far the most exciting, satisfying and exhilarating time to be alive is the time in which we pass from ignorance to knowledge on these fundamental issues.

— p. xiii

== Title ==
The title essay is named in honor of the French physician, anatomist and anthropologist Paul Broca (1824–1880). He is best known for his discovery that different functions are assigned to different parts of the brain. He believed that by studying the brains of cadavers and correlating the known experiences of the former owners of the organs, human behavior could eventually be discovered and understood. To that end, he saved hundreds of human brains in jars of formalin; among the collection is his own brain. When Sagan finds it in the Musée de l'Homme, he poses questions that challenge some core ideas of human existence such as "How much of that man known as Paul Broca can still be found in this jar?"—a question that evokes both religious and scientific argument.

== Contents ==
A major part of the book is devoted to debunking "paradoxers" who either live at the edge of science or are outright charlatans. An example of this is the controversy surrounding Immanuel Velikovsky's ideas presented in the book Worlds in Collision. Another large part of the book discusses naming conventions for the members of the Solar System and their physical features. Sagan also discusses science fiction at some length. Here, he mentions Robert A. Heinlein as being one of his favorite science fiction authors in his childhood. Near-death experiences and their cultural ambiguity is another topic of the essays. Sagan also criticizes ideas developed in Robert K. G. Temple's book The Sirius Mystery, published three years earlier in 1975.

In the final section of the book, "Ultimate Questions", Sagan writes:

My deeply held belief is that if a god of anything like the traditional sort exists, our curiosity and intelligence were provided by such a god ... on the other hand if such a god does not exist then our curiosity and intelligence are the essential tools for survival. In either case the enterprise of knowledge is essential for the welfare of the human species.

== Reception ==
Kirkus Reviews stated that, as an essayist, Sagan was "no Bronowski", and overall judged the collection to be "a mixed, often surprising bag of treats".

People considered that—aside from the "strangely touching" chapter about Broca's preserved brain—the book as a whole "rambles", with "plenty of science ... but little romance."
