= Kronos: A Journal of Interdisciplinary Synthesis =

Kronos
- Discipline: Immanuel Velikovsky
- Language: English
- Edited by: Lewis M. Greenberg

Publication details
- History: 1975–1988
- Publisher: Kronos Press

Standard abbreviations
- ISO 4: Kronos

Indexing
- ISSN: 0361-6584

Links
- Journal homepage; Online access

Kronos: A Journal of Interdisciplinary Synthesis published articles on topics related to the theories of Immanuel Velikovsky, it was "founded, with no apologies, to deal with Velikovsky's work"; and as such hosted epigraphs on a wide range of subjects from ancient history, catastrophism and mythology. It ran 44 issues from the Spring of 1975 to the Spring of 1988. The title is an homage to the Greek name for the Roman god Saturn whose planetary namesake Velikovsky believed Earth once orbited as a satellite. Professor of Social Theory Alfred de Grazia at New York University, co-author of The Velikovsky Affair and avowed supporter of some of Velikovsky's maverick ideas, however, remarked that although the journal was devoted to discussing Velikovsky's ideas, "[t]his is not to say that the directors of Kronos were uncritical". The journal was published by Kronos Press, a division of Cosmos and Chronos (a US-registered 501(c) organization). Its subscription list grew to about 2000 and then settled to about 1500 people from 10 countries.

== Books ==
Two issues of Kronos were also published as books:

- Velikovsky and Establishment Science (Kronos Vol. III, No. 2 Winter 1977), ISBN 978-0-917994-03-6.
- Scientists Confront Scientists Who Confront Velikovsky (Kronos Vol. IV, No. 2 Winter 1978), ISBN 978-0-917994-06-7.

Both issues concerned the 1974 AAAS meeting in San Francisco (Mon Feb 25, 1974) in a session "Velikovsky's Challenge to Science", whose papers were subsequently published in the book Scientists Confront Velikovsky (1977) (with exception of the papers from Velikovsky himself and Irving Michelson, and additional papers by the editor, Goldsmith, Isaac Asimov and David Morrison).

== History ==
Kronos was founded in October 1974, by (1) then associate professor of art history Lewis M. Greenberg of the Moore College of Art (Philadelphia), whose title was Editor-in-Chief, (2) with financing, production, and management being coordinated by then associate professor of Religion Warner B. Sizemore at Glassboro State College as Executive Editor, and (3) by then Professor of History Robert H. Hewsen at Glassboro State College as the first Senior Editor who was also Director of the Center for Velikovskian and Interdisciplinary Studies at Glassboro State College. With the completion of volume XII in May 1988, the Editor-in-Chief announced "KRONOS will go on hiatus with the expectation that a publication schedule can be resumed some time in 1990." The hiatus was permanent.

== Reception ==
In his book Beyond Velikovsky, Henry H. Bauer (a person who himself is criticized for supporting various pseudoscientific ideas) commented on a number of pro-Velikovskian journals, including Kronos, and noted:

"Contributors to these journals range from orthodox specialists who expound some aspect of their specialty, at times in criticism of Velikovskian ideas, through established specialists who keep an open mind about various aspects of Velikovsky's scenario, to the real aficionados. There are people with impeccable credentials here; see, for example, the staff of Kronos, which was listed together with professional identifications in each issue of the first five volumes of that journal: anthropologists, philosophers, physicists, psychologists, and others holding responsible positions in and outside academia."

Robert Schadewald commented that "Though Velikovsky's views were rejected by scientists, a small but vociferous band of followers carries on Velikovsky's work. They also publish a journal, Kronos, which is at least as scientific as the Creation Research Society Quarterly."

== See also ==
- Pensée (Immanuel Velikovsky Reconsidered), a special series of ten issues of the magazine Pensée
