= Robert V. Gentry =

American young Earth creationist & nuclear physicist

Robert Vance Gentry
- Born: July 9, 1933; Chattanooga, Tennessee
- Died: January 28, 2020 (aged 86); Loma Linda, California
- Education: University of Florida
- Known for: Young Earth creationist interpretations of radiohalos
- Scientific career
- Fields: Nuclear physics

Robert Vance Gentry (July 9, 1933 – January 28, 2020) was an American young Earth creationist and nuclear physicist, known for his claims that radiohalos provide evidence for a young age of the Earth.

== Thesis ==
Gentry noted that the 218 polonium radio halos only formed at temperatures below 300 degrees and were visible for less than 3 minutes, thus requiring the Precambrian granites where they are to have formed by a quick process yet "mysterious" cold, highlighting the singularities of the continental crust in relation to the oceanic crust. When questioned in debates that defended the thermal paradigm in the formation of the earth's rocks, Gentry challenged them to then reproduce Precambrian granites containing the same, in miniature, since such a process should then be able to imitate the formation of granites containing halos. After unanswered decades, Australian geologist Andrew Snelling proposed a model "in which hydrothermal fluids separated 222 Rn and their parents' Po isotopes 238 U in zircons and transported them over very short distances along cleavage planes in the host and adjacent, biotites until 222 Rn decays and the Po isotopes were chemically concentrated in radiocentres, to later produce the Po radiohalos."

== Career ==
Gentry received a master's degree in physics from the University of Florida, and then worked in the defense industry in nuclear weapons research. In 1959, he was influenced by a verse he read in the Bible while looking at polonium halos, and subsequently converted to Seventh-day Adventism. Thereafter, he entered the doctoral program at Georgia Institute of Technology, but left when he was refused permission to work on the age of the Earth for his dissertation.

By this time he was convinced that radiohalos might be the key to determining the age of the Earth, and might be capable of vindicating flood geology. He continued to work on the subject at home using a small microscope and attempted to publish his results (minus his creationist conclusions) in one or more peer reviewed scientific journals. In 1969, while Gentry was affiliated with an Adventist college in Maryland, Oak Ridge National Laboratory invited him to use their facilities, as a guest scientist in the hope that his work on radiohalos might lead to discovering super-heavy elements. This relationship was terminated as a result of his participation in McLean v. Arkansas.

== Claims and criticism ==
Gentry has had strong disagreements with other creationists over some details of flood geology. A number of creationists, including fellow Seventh-day Adventists, have criticised his work.

In the late 1970s, Gentry challenged the scientific community to synthesize "a hand-sized specimen of a typical biotite-bearing granite" as a test of his claims. The scientific response was dismissive. Geologist G. Brent Dalrymple stated: "As far as I am concerned, Gentry's challenge is silly. … He has proposed an absurd and inconclusive experiment to test a perfectly ridiculous and unscientific hypothesis that ignores virtually the entire body of geological knowledge."

In 1981, Gentry was a defense witness in the McLean v. Arkansas case over the constitutional validity of Act 590 that mandated that "creation science" be given equal time in public schools with evolution. Act 590 was ruled to be unconstitutional (a verdict that was upheld by the Supreme Court in Edwards v. Aguillard).

Gentry has devised his own creationist cosmology and filed a lawsuit in 2001 against Los Alamos National Laboratory and Cornell University after personnel deleted ten of his papers about his cosmology from the public preprint server arXiv. On 23 March 2004, Gentry's lawsuit against arXiv was dismissed by a Tennessee court on the grounds that it lacked territorial jurisdiction, as neither defendant in the case was considered to have a significant presence in the state of Tennessee.

His self-published book Creation's Tiny Mystery was reviewed by geologist Gregg Wilkerson, who said that it has several logical flaws and concluded that "the book is a source of much misinformation about current geologic thinking and confuses fact with interpretation." Wilkerson also noted that the book contains considerable autobiographical material and he observed that "[i]n general I don't think educators will find it's worth their time to tread through this creationist's whining." This criticism of Gentry's "frequent whining about discrimination" has also been made by fellow creationists, who concluded that "his scientific snubs resulted more from his own abrasive style than from his peculiar ideas", according to critic Ronald L. Numbers, a historian of science.

== Selected publications ==
- Gentry, Robert V. (14 June 1968). "Fossil Alpha-Recoil Analysis of Certain Variant Radioactive Halos". Science. 160 (3833): 1228–1230. Bibcode:1968Sci...160.1228G. doi:10.1126/science.160.3833.1228. PMID 17818744. S2CID 10932798.
- Gentry, Robert V. (14 August 1970). "Giant Radioactive Halos: Indicators of Unknown Radioactivity?". Science. 169 (3946): 670–673. Bibcode:1970Sci...169..670G. doi:10.1126/science.169.3946.670. PMID 17791843. S2CID 33001798.
- Gentry, Robert V. (5 April 1974). "Radiohalos in a Radiochronological and Cosmological Perspective". Science. 184 (4132): 62–66. Bibcode:1974Sci...184...62G. doi:10.1126/science.184.4132.62. PMID 17734632. S2CID 21556640.
- Gentry, Robert V.; Gary L. Glish; Eddy H. McBay (October 1982). "Helium Retention in Zircons : Implications for Nuclear Waste Management". Geophysical Research Letters. 9 (10): 1129–1130. doi:10.1029/GL009i010p01129.
- Gentry, Robert V.; T. A. Cahill; R. G. Flocchini; N. R. Fletcher; H. C. Kaufmann; L. R. Medsker; J. W. Nelson (1976). "Evidence for Primordial Superheavy Elements". Physical Review Letters. 37 (1): 11–15. Bibcode:1976PhRvL..37...11G. doi:10.1103/PhysRevLett.37.11.
- Robert V. Gentry, (1986). Creation's Tiny Mystery. (Knoxville, Tenn.: Earth Science Associates) Page 66 ISBN 0-9616753-1-4
