= William Napier (astronomer) =

British astronomer and writer

William M. Napier (born 29 June 1940) is a Scottish astronomer and astrophysicist, with research interests in astrobiology and cosmology. In addition to his scientific output, which includes numerous peer-reviewed papers, Napier has co-authored several works of popular nonfiction about his field of research. He is also the author of five high tech thriller novels.

== Career ==
Napier received his Bachelor of Science degree in 1963 and his Doctor of Philosophy degree in 1966, both from the University of Glasgow.

Napier is a professional astronomer who has worked at the Royal Observatory in Edinburgh, the University of Oxford and Armagh Observatory. He is currently an honorary professor of Astrobiology in the Center for Astrobiology at Cardiff University, which describes him as "a leading figure in the dynamics and physics of comets, and a pioneer of the modern versions of catastrophism." He is also an honorary professor at the Buckingham Centre for Astrobiology, University of Buckingham, which describes him as, "a pioneer of modern studies of the impact hazard due to asteroids and comets," and also as having, "carried out an investigation of long-running claims of anomalous QSO/galaxy associations." His research work focuses on comets and cosmology. The result of his collaboration with Victor Clube and others on the role of giant comets in Earth history is known as "coherent catastrophism."

According to Napier, 13,000 years ago the earth was affected by a major, rapid cooling event that caused the extinction of a large number of species and a major disruption of paleoindian cultures. Napier argues for the Younger Dryas impact hypothesis that the cooling event was caused by the collision with "a dense trail of material from a large disintegrating comet," He is a member of the Comet Research Group, which raises money for, and conducts research in this area as well as biblical archaeology.

== Selected bibliography ==
=== Nonfiction ===
- The Cosmic Serpent (1982), with Victor Clube
- The Cosmic Winter (1990), with Victor Clube
- The Origin of Comets (1990), with M. E. Bailey and Victor Clube
- Catastrophes and Comets: The Destroyers of Cosmic Faith (2004) with Victor Clube

=== Fiction (as Bill Napier) ===
- Nemesis (1998), a science-fiction thriller
- Revelation (2000)
- The Lure (2002)
- Shattered Icon (Splintered Icon in the US) (2003)
- The Furies (2009) (St. Martin's Press)
