= Immanuel Velikovsky =

Russian-American writer and catastrophist

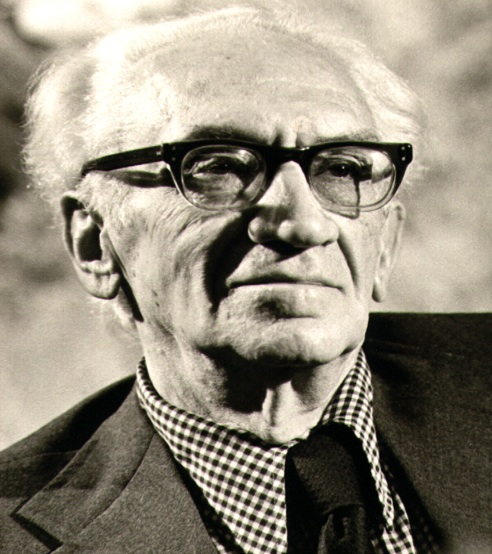
- Immanuel Velikovsky at the 1974 American Association for the Advancement of Science Conference in San Francisco
- Born: 10 June 1895; Vitebsk, Russian Empire (in present-day Belarus)
- Died: 17 November 1979 (aged 84); Princeton, New Jersey, U.S.
- Education: Moscow State University

Immanuel Velikovsky (/ˌvɛliˈkɒfski/; Russian: Иммануи́л Велико́вский, IPA: [ɪmənʊˈil vʲɪlʲɪˈkofskʲɪj]; 10 June [O.S. 29 May] 1895 – 17 November 1979) was a Russian and American psychoanalyst, writer, and catastrophist. He is the author of several books offering pseudohistorical interpretations of ancient history, including the U.S. bestseller Worlds in Collision published in 1950. Velikovsky's work is frequently cited as a canonical example of pseudoscience and has been used as an example of the demarcation problem.

His books use comparative mythology and ancient literary sources (including the Old Testament) to argue that Earth suffered catastrophic close contacts with other planets (principally Venus and Mars) in ancient history. In positioning Velikovsky among catastrophists including Hans Bellamy, Ignatius Donnelly, and Johann Gottlieb Radlof, the British astronomers Victor Clube and Bill Napier noted "... Velikovsky is not so much the first of the new catastrophists ...; he is the last in a line of traditional catastrophists going back to mediaeval times and probably earlier." Velikovsky argued that electromagnetic effects play an important role in celestial mechanics. He also proposed a revised chronology for ancient Egypt, Greece, Israel, and other cultures of the ancient Near East. The revised chronology aimed at explaining the so-called "dark age" of the eastern Mediterranean (c. 1100–750 BC) and reconciling biblical accounts with widely accepted archaeology and Egyptian chronology.

In general, Velikovsky's ideas have been ignored or vigorously rejected by the academic community. Nonetheless, his books often sold well and gained enthusiastic support in lay circles, often fuelled by claims of unfair treatment of Velikovsky by orthodox academia. The controversy surrounding his work and its reception is often referred to as "the Velikovsky affair".

== Childhood and early education ==
Immanuel Velikovsky was born in 1895 to a prosperous Jewish family in Vitebsk, Russian Empire (now in Belarus). The son of Shimon (Simon Yehiel) Velikovsky (1859–1937) and Beila Grodensky, he learned several languages as a child and was sent away to study at the Medvednikov Gymnasium in Moscow, where he performed well in Russian language and mathematics. He graduated with a gold medal in 1913. Velikovsky then traveled in Europe and visited Palestine before briefly studying medicine at Montpellier in France and taking premedical courses at the University of Edinburgh. He returned to Russia before the outbreak of World War I, enrolled in the University of Moscow, and received a medical degree in 1921.

== Editorial work and marriage ==
Upon taking his medical degree, Velikovsky left Russia for Berlin. With the financial support of his father, Velikovsky edited and published two volumes of scientific papers translated into Hebrew. The volumes were titled Scripta Universitatis Atque Bibliothecae Hierosolymitanarum ("Writings of the Jerusalem University & Library"). He enlisted Albert Einstein to prepare the volume dealing with mathematics and physics.

In 1923, Velikovsky married Elisheva Kramer, a violinist and later sculptor.

== Career as a psychiatrist ==
Velikovsky lived in what was then the British Mandate of Palestine from 1924 to 1939, practising medicine in the fields of general practice, psychiatry, and psychoanalysis, which he had studied under Sigmund Freud's pupil Wilhelm Stekel in Vienna. During this time, he had about a dozen papers published in medical and psychoanalytic journals. He was also published in Freud's Imago, including a precocious analysis of Freud's own dreams.

== Emigration to the US and a career as an author ==
In 1939, with the prospect of war looming, Velikovsky travelled with his family to New York City, intending to spend a sabbatical year researching for his book Oedipus and Akhenaton. The book was inspired by Freud's Moses and Monotheism and explored the possibility that Pharaoh Akhenaton was the legendary Oedipus. Freud had argued that Akhenaton, the supposedly monotheistic Egyptian pharaoh, was the source of the religious principles that Moses taught to the people of Israel in the desert. Freud's claim (and that of others before him) was based in part on the resemblance of Psalm 104 in the Bible to the Great Hymn to the Aten, an Egyptian hymn discovered on the wall of the tomb of Akhenaten's courtier, Ay, in Akhenaten's city of Akhetaten. To disprove Freud's claim and to prove the Exodus as such, Velikovsky sought evidence for the Exodus in Egyptian documents. One such document was the Ipuwer Papyrus, which he felt reported events similar to several of the Biblical plagues. Since conventional Egyptology dated the Ipuwer Papyrus much earlier than either the Biblical date for the Exodus (c. 1500–1450 BCE) or the Exodus date accepted by many of those who accepted the conventional chronology of Egypt (c. 1250 BCE), Velikovsky had to revise the conventional chronology.

Within weeks of his arrival in the United States, World War II began. Launching on a tangent from his original book project, Velikovsky began to develop the radical catastrophist cosmology and revised chronology for which he would become notorious. For the remainder of the Second World War, now as a permanent resident of New York City, he continued to research and write about his ideas, searching for a means to disseminate them to academia and the public. He privately published two small Scripta Academica pamphlets in 1945 (Theses for the Reconstruction of Ancient History and Cosmos Without Gravitation). He mailed copies of the latter to academic libraries and scientists, including Harvard astronomer Harlow Shapley in 1947.

In 1950, after eight publishing houses rejected the Worlds in Collision manuscript, it was finally published by Macmillan, which had a large presence in the academic textbook market. Even before its appearance, the book was enveloped by furious controversy, when Harper's Magazine published a highly positive feature on it, as did Reader's Digest, with what would today be called a creationist slant. This came to the attention of Shapley, who opposed the publication of the work, having been made familiar with Velikovsky's claims through the pamphlet Velikovsky had given him. Shapley threatened to organise a textbook boycott of Macmillan for its publication of Worlds in Collision, and within two months the book was transferred to Doubleday. It was by then a bestseller in the United States. In 1952, Doubleday published the first installment in Velikovsky's revised chronology, Ages in Chaos, followed by the Earth in Upheaval (a geological volume) in 1955. In November 1952, Velikovsky moved from Manhattan to Princeton, New Jersey.

For most of the 1950s and early 1960s, Velikovsky was persona non grata on college and university campuses. After this period, he began to receive more requests to speak. He lectured, frequently to record crowds, at universities across North America. In 1972, the Canadian Broadcasting Corporation aired a one-hour television special featuring Velikovsky and his work, and this was followed by a thirty-minute documentary by the BBC in 1973.

During the remainder of the 1970s, Velikovsky devoted a great deal of his time and energy to rebutting his critics in academia, and he continued to tour North America and Europe to deliver lectures on his ideas. By that time, the elderly Velikovsky had diabetes and intermittent depression, which his daughter said may have been exacerbated by the scientific community's continuing rejection of his work. He died in 1979.

== Posthumous administration of literary estate ==
For many years, Velikovsky's estate was controlled by his two daughters, Shulamit Velikovsky Kogan (b. 1925), and Ruth Ruhama Velikovsky Sharon (b. 1926), who generally resisted the publication of any further material. (Exceptions include the biography ABA – the Glory and the Torment: The Life of Dr. Immanuel Velikovsky, issued in 1995 and greeted with rather dubious reviews; and a Hebrew translation of another Ages in Chaos volume, The Dark Age of Greece, which was published in Israel.) A volume of Velikovsky's discussions and correspondence with Albert Einstein appeared in Hebrew in Israel, translated and edited by his daughter Shulamit Velikovsky Kogan. In the late 1990s, a large portion of Velikovsky's unpublished book manuscripts, essays and correspondence became available at the Velikovsky Archive website. In 2005, Velikovsky's daughter Ruth Sharon presented his entire archive to Princeton University Library.

== Ideas ==
In the 1920s and 1930s, Velikovsky published his concepts in medical and psychoanalytic journals. He is best known, however, for research performed in the 1940s when living in New York City. His main ideas in this area were summarized in an affidavit of November 1942, and two privately published Scripta Academica pamphlets, Theses for the Reconstruction of Ancient History (1945) and Cosmos without Gravitation (1946).

Rather than have his ideas dismissed wholesale because of potential flaws in any one area, Velikovsky then chose to publish them as a series of book volumes, aimed at a lay audience, dealing separately with his proposals on ancient history, and with areas more relevant to the physical sciences. Velikovsky was a passionate Zionist, and this did steer the focus of his work, although its scope was considerably more far-reaching than this. The entire body of work could be said to stem from an attempt to solve the following problem: that to Velikovsky there appeared to be insufficient correlation in the written or archaeological records between Biblical history and what was known of the history of the area, in particular, Egypt.

Velikovsky searched for common mention of events within literary records, and in the Ipuwer Papyrus he believed he had found a contemporary Egyptian account of the Plagues of Egypt. Moreover, he interpreted both accounts as descriptions of a great natural catastrophe. Velikovsky attempted to investigate the physical cause of these events, and extrapolated backwards and forwards in history from this point, cross-comparing written and mythical records from cultures on every inhabited continent, using them to attempt synchronisms of the historical records, yielding what he believed to be further periodic natural catastrophes that can be global in scale.

He arrived at a body of radical inter-disciplinary ideas, which might be summarised as:

- Planet Earth has suffered natural catastrophes on a global scale, both before and during humankind's recorded history.
- There is evidence for these catastrophes in the geological record (here Velikovsky was advocating Catastrophist ideas as opposed to the prevailing Uniformitarian notions) and archeological record. The extinction of many species had occurred catastrophically, not by gradual Darwinian means.
- The catastrophes that occurred within the memory of humankind are recorded in the myths, legends and written history of all ancient cultures and civilisations. Velikovsky pointed to alleged concordances in the accounts of many cultures, and proposed that they referred to the same real events. For instance, the memory of a flood is recorded in the Hebrew Bible, in the Greek legend of Deucalion, and in the Manu legend of India. Velikovsky put forward the psychoanalytic idea of "Cultural Amnesia" as a mechanism whereby these literal records came to be regarded as mere myths and legends.
- The causes of these natural catastrophes were close encounters between the Earth and other bodies within the Solar System – not least what are now the planets Saturn, Jupiter, Venus, and Mars, these bodies having moved upon different orbits within human memory.
- To explain the fact that these changes to the configuration of the Solar System violate several well-understood laws of physics, Velikovsky invented a role for electromagnetic forces in counteracting gravity and orbital mechanics.

Some of Velikovsky's specific postulated catastrophes included:

- A tentative suggestion that Earth had once been a satellite of a "proto-Saturn" body, before its current solar orbit.
- That the Deluge (Noah's Flood) had been caused by proto-Saturn's entering a nova state, and ejecting much of its mass into space.
- A suggestion that the planet Mercury was involved in the Tower of Babel catastrophe.
- Jupiter had been the prime mover in the catastrophe that saw the destruction of Sodom and Gomorrah.
- Periodic close contacts with a "cometary Venus" (which had been ejected from Jupiter) had caused the Exodus events (c. 1500 BCE) and Joshua's subsequent "sun standing still" (Joshua 10:12–13) incident.
- Periodic close contacts with Mars had caused havoc in the 8th and 7th centuries BCE.

As noted above, Velikovsky had conceived the broad sweep of this material by the early 1940s. However, within his lifetime, whilst he continued to research, expand and lecture upon the details of his ideas, he released only selected portions of his work to the public in book form:

- Worlds in Collision (1950) discussed the literary and mythical records of the "Venus" and "Mars" catastrophes
- Portions of his Revised Chronology were published as Ages in Chaos (1952), Peoples of the Sea (1977) and Rameses II and His Time (1978) (The related monograph Oedipus and Akhenaten, 1960, posited the thesis that pharaoh Akhenaten was the prototype for the Greek mythic figure Oedipus.)
- Earth in Upheaval (1955) dealt with geological evidence for global natural catastrophes.

Velikovsky's ideas on his earlier Saturn/Mercury/Jupiter events were never published, and the available archived manuscripts are much less developed.

Of all the strands of his work, Velikovsky published least on his belief that electromagnetism plays a role in orbital mechanics. Although he appears to have retreated from the propositions in his 1946 monograph Cosmos without Gravitation, no such retreat is apparent in Stargazers and Gravediggers. Cosmos without Gravitation, which Velikovsky placed in university libraries and sent to scientists, is a probable catalyst for the hostile response of astronomers and physicists to his later claims about astronomy. However, other Velikovskian enthusiasts such as Ralph Juergens (dec.), Earl Milton (dec.), Wal Thornhill (dec.), and Donald E. Scott have claimed that stars are powered not by internal nuclear fusion, but by galactic-scale electrical discharge currents. Such ideas do not find support in the conventional literature and are rejected as pseudoscience by the scientific community.

== Revised chronology ==
Velikovsky argued that the conventional chronology of the Near East and classical world, based upon Egyptian Sothic dating and the king lists of Manetho, was wholly flawed. This was the reason for the apparent absence of correlation between the Biblical account and those of neighbouring cultures, and also the cause of the enigmatic "Dark Ages" in Greece and elsewhere. Velikovsky shifted several chronologies and dynasties from the Egyptian Old Kingdom to Ptolemaic times by centuries (a scheme he called the Revised Chronology), placing The Exodus contemporary with the fall of the Middle Kingdom of Egypt. He proposed numerous other synchronisms stretching up to the time of Alexander the Great. He argued that these eliminate the phantom "Dark Ages" and vindicate the biblical accounts of history and those recorded by Herodotus.

These ideas were first put forward briefly in his Theses for the Reconstruction of Ancient History, but Ages in Chaos was his first full-length work on the subject. This was followed by Oedipus and Akhenaton, Peoples of the Sea and Rameses II and His Time, and two further works that were unpublished at the time of his death but that are now available online at the Velikovsky Archive: The Assyrian Conquest and The Dark Ages of Greece.

Though rejected by historians, these ideas have been developed by other authors such as David Rohl and Peter James, who have also attempted their own revised chronologies.

== Reception ==
=== Velikovskyism ===
C. Leroy Ellenberger with Immanuel Velikovsky at Seaside Heights, New Jersey, in 1978.

Velikovsky inspired numerous followers during the 1960s and 1970s. Alfred de Grazia dedicated a 1963 issue of his journal, American Behavioral Scientist, to Velikovsky, which was published in an expanded version as a book, The Velikovsky Affair – Scientism Versus Science, in 1966. The Skeptical Inquirer, in a review of a later book by de Grazia, Cosmic Heretics (1984), suggests that de Grazia's efforts may be responsible for Velikovsky's continuing notability during the 1970s.

The Society for Interdisciplinary Studies (SIS) was "formed in 1974 in response to the growing interest in the works of modern catastrophists, notably the highly controversial Dr. Immanuel Velikovsky". The Institute for the Study of Interdisciplinary Sciences (ISIS) is a 1985 spinoff from the SIS founded under the directorship of David Rohl, who had come to reject Velikovsky's Revised Chronology in favour of his own "New Chronology".

Kronos: A Journal of Interdisciplinary Synthesis was founded in 1975 explicitly "to deal with Velikovsky's work". Ten issues of Pensée: Immanuel Velikovsky Reconsidered appeared from 1972 to 1975. The controversy surrounding Velikovsky peaked in the mid-1970s and public interest declined in the 1980s and, by 1984, erstwhile Velikovskyist C. Leroy Ellenberger had become a vocal critic of Velikovskian catastrophism. Some Velikovskyist publications and authors such as David Talbott remain active into the 2000s.

=== Criticism ===
Velikovsky's ideas have been rejected by the scientific community and his work is generally regarded as erroneous in all its detailed conclusions. Moreover, scholars view his unorthodox methodology (for example, using comparative mythology to derive scenarios in celestial mechanics) as an unacceptable way to arrive at conclusions. Stephen Jay Gould offered a synopsis of the scientific community's response to Velikovsky, writing, "Velikovsky is neither crank nor charlatan—although, to state my opinion and to quote one of my colleagues, he is at least gloriously wrong ... Velikovsky would rebuild the science of celestial mechanics to save the literal accuracy of ancient legends."

Velikovsky's bestselling, and as a consequence most criticized, book is Worlds in Collision. Astronomer Harlow Shapley, along with others such as Cecilia Payne-Gaposchkin, were highly critical of Macmillan's decision to publish the work. The fundamental criticism against this book from the astronomy community was that its celestial mechanics were physically impossible, requiring planetary orbits that do not conform with the laws of conservation of energy and conservation of angular momentum.

Velikovsky relates in his book Stargazers & Gravediggers how he tried to protect himself from criticism of his celestial mechanics by removing the original appendix on the subject from Worlds in Collision, hoping that the merit of his ideas would be evaluated on the basis of his comparative mythology and use of literary sources alone. However, this strategy did not protect him: the appendix was an expanded version of the Cosmos Without Gravitation monograph, which he had already distributed to Shapley and others in the late 1940s—and they had regarded the physics within it as absurd.

By 1974, the controversy surrounding Velikovsky's work had permeated US society to the point where the American Association for the Advancement of Science felt obliged to address the situation, as they had previously done in relation to UFOs, and devoted a scientific session to Velikovsky featuring (among others) Velikovsky himself and Professor Carl Sagan. Sagan gave a critique of Velikovsky's ideas (the book version of Sagan's critique is much longer than that presented in the talk; see below). His criticisms are available in Scientists Confront Velikovsky and as a corrected and revised version in the book Broca's Brain: Reflections on the Romance of Science.

It was not until the 1980s that a very detailed critique of Worlds in Collision was made in terms of its use of mythical and literary sources when Bob Forrest published a highly critical examination of them (see below). Earlier in 1974, James Fitton published a brief critique of Velikovsky's interpretation of myth (ignored by Velikovsky and his defenders) whose indictment began: "In at least three important ways Velikovsky's use of mythology is unsound. The first of these is his proclivity to treat all myths as having independent value; the second is the tendency to treat only such material as is consistent with his thesis; and the third is his very unsystematic method." A short analysis of the position of arguments in the late 20th century is given by Dr Velikovsky's ex-associate, and Kronos editor, C. Leroy Ellenberger, in his A Lesson from Velikovsky.

More recently, the absence of supporting material in ice-core studies (such as the Greenland Dye-3 and Vostok cores) has removed any basis for the proposition of a global catastrophe of the proposed dimension within the later Holocene period. However, tree-ring expert Mike Baillie would give credit to Velikovsky after disallowing the impossible aspects of Worlds in Collision: "However, I would not disagree with all aspects of Velikovsky's work. Velikovsky was almost certainly correct in his assertion that ancient texts hold clues to catastrophic events in the relatively recent past, within the span of human civilization, which involve the effects of comets, meteorites and cometary dust ... But fundamentally, Velikovsky did not understand anything about comets ... He did not know about the hazard posed by relatively small objects ... This failure to recognize the power of comets and asteroids means that it is reasonable to go back to Velikovsky and delete all the physically impossible text about Venus and Mars passing close to the earth ... In other words, we can get down to his main thesis, which is that the Earth experienced dramatic events from heavenly bodies particularly in the second millennium BC."

Velikovsky's revised chronology has been rejected by nearly all historians and Egyptologists. It was claimed, starting with early reviewers, that Velikovsky's usage of material for proof is often very selective. In 1965 the leading cuneiformist Abraham Sachs, in a forum at Brown University, discredited Velikovsky's use of Mesopotamian cuneiform sources. Velikovsky was never able to refute Sachs' attack. In 1978, following the much-postponed publication of further volumes in Velikovsky's Ages in Chaos series, the United Kingdom-based Society for Interdisciplinary Studies organised a conference in Glasgow specifically to debate the revised chronology. The ultimate conclusion of this work, by scholars including Peter James, John Bimson, Geoffrey Gammonn, and David Rohl, was that the Revised Chronology was untenable. The SIS has continued to publish updates of this ongoing discussion, in particular the work of historian Emmet Sweeney.

While James credits Velikovsky with "point[ing] the way to a solution by challenging Egyptian chronology", he severely criticised the contents of Velikovsky's chronology as "disastrously extreme", producing "a rash of new problems far more severe than those it hoped to solve" and claiming that "Velikovsky understood little of archaeology and nothing of stratigraphy."

Bauer accuses Velikovsky of dogmatically asserting interpretations which are at best possible, and gives several examples from Ages in Chaos.

== "The Velikovsky Affair" ==
Commentators have made an analysis of the conflict itself. Among these was a study by American Behavioral Scientist magazine, eventually published in book form as The Velikovsky Affair – Scientism Versus Science. This framed the discussion in terms of how academic disciplines reacted to ideas from workers from outside their field, claiming that there was an academic aversion to permitting people to cross inter-disciplinary boundaries. More recently, James Gilbert, professor of history at the University of Maryland, challenged this traditional version with an account that focused on the intellectual rivalry between Velikovsky's ally Horace Kallen and Harlow Shapley. Earlier, Henry Bauer had challenged the view that the Velikovsky Affair illustrated the resistance of scientists to new ideas by pointing out "the nature and validity of Velikovsky's claims must be considered before one decides that the Affair can illuminate the reception of new ideas in science ..." and, on the same basis, Keith Dixon contended that the treatment of the case by sociologists was an example of a broader unhealthy tendency in sociology to explain all opinions as ideologically motivated without considering their possible rational basis.

The scientific press, in general, denied Velikovsky a forum to rebut his critics. Velikovsky claimed that this made him a "suppressed genius", and he likened himself to the 16th century heretical friar Giordano Bruno, who was burnt at the stake for his beliefs.

The controversy created by Velikovsky's publications may have helped revive the catastrophist movement in the second half of the 20th century; however, some working in the field also hold that progress has actually been retarded by the negative aspects of the so-called Velikovsky Affair.

== Works ==
Title	Year	Publisher	ISBN	Notes
Worlds in Collision	1950	Macmillan	978-1-906833-11-4	original edition
Worlds in Collision	1950	Doubleday	978-1-906833-11-4	transferred to new publisher
Worlds in Collision	2009	Paradigma	978-1-906833-11-4	reissued
Ages in Chaos: From the Exodus to King Akhnaton	1952	Doubleday	978-1-906833-13-8	first edition
Ages in Chaos: From the Exodus to King Akhnaton	2009	Paradigma	978-1-906833-51-0	reissued
Earth In Upheaval	1955	Doubleday	978-1-906833-12-1	first edition
Earth In Upheaval	2009	Paradigma	978-1-906833-52-7	reissued
Oedipus and Akhnaton	1960	Doubleday	978-1-906833-18-3	first edition
Oedipus and Akhnaton	2018	Paradigma	978-1-906833-58-9	reissued
Peoples of the Sea (Ages in Chaos)	1977	Doubleday	978-1-906833-15-2	first edition
Peoples of the Sea (Ages in Chaos)	2011	Paradigma	978-1-906833-55-8	reissued
Ramses II and His Time (Ages in Chaos)	1978	Doubleday	978-1-906833-14-5	first edition
Ramses II and His Time (Ages in Chaos)	2010	Paradigma	978-1-906833-54-1	reissued
Mankind in Amnesia	1982	Doubleday	978-1-906833-16-9	first edition
Mankind in Amnesia	2010	Paradigma	978-1-906833-56-5	reissued
Stargazers and Gravediggers	1983	William Morrow	978-1-906833-17-6	first edition
Stargazers and Gravediggers	2012	Paradigma	978-1-906833-57-2	reissued
In the Beginning	2020	Paradigma	978-1-906833-50-3	also available from the Velikovsky archive
The Dark Age of Greece (Ages in Chaos)	2023	Paradigma	978-1-906833-59-6	also available from the Velikovsky archive
The Assyrian Conquest (Ages in Chaos)	posthumous	unpublished	manuscript	available from the Velikovsky archive
