= Victor Clube =

English astrophysicist

Stace Victor Murray Clube (born 22 October 1934 in London) is an English astrophysicist.

== Biography ==
He was educated at St John's School, Leatherhead and Christ Church, Oxford. He played first-class cricket for Oxford University. He appeared seventeen times for the university between 1956 and 1959, but only won a Blue—the awarding of the Oxford "colours" to sportsmen—in his first year there, appearing in the 1956 University match against Cambridge. During that match, which finished as a draw, he took just one wicket with his off break bowling.

Clube obtained his doctorate in 1959 with a thesis titled Interferometry of the Solar Chemosphere and Photosphere and went on to become a professional astrophysicist and astronomer. He has been Dean of the Astrophysics Department of Oxford University, and has worked at the observatories of Edinburgh, Armagh and Cape Town.

In 1994 he appeared in the BBC Horizon programme; "The Hunt for the Doomsday Asteroid".

The asteroid 6523 Clube is named after him.

== The Cosmic Serpent and The Cosmic Winter ==
Co-authored with William Napier they put forward a case for giant comets causing what they call "coherent catastrophism". Astrophysicist David Morrison " describes their work as an argument that:

the association of gods with planets in many ancient cultures, the widespread fear of comets and belief in angels, and many other aspects of our cultural and religious history are a reflection of massive bombardment of the planet a few thousand years ago. They further conclude that more recent historical events, including the collapse of the Roman Empire, the Dark Ages, and even the English Civil War, are related to climate changes induced by exceptional deposition of cosmic dust in Earth's atmosphere.

== Selected bibliography ==
- The Cosmic Serpent (1982), with Bill Napier
- The Cosmic Winter (1990), with Bill Napier
- The Origin of Comets (1990), with M. E. Bailey and Bill Napier
- Close encounters with a million comets (15 July 1982). New Scientist 95, (1314), 148–151, with Bill Napier
- The microstructure of terrestrial catastrophism (1984). Mon. Not. R. astr. Soc. 211, 953–968, with Bill Napier
- The dynamics of armageddon (1988). Speculations of Science and Technology 11 (4), 255–264; reprinted in Zysman, Milton and Clark Whelton (eds.) (1990). Catastrophism 2000: A Sourcebook for the Conference Reconsidering Velikovsky, Toronto, Canada, pp. 5–16.
- Giant Comets and Their Role in History, Chapter 14 in Singer, S. Fred (ed.) (1990). The Universe and Its Origin: From Ancient Myth to Present Reality and Fantasy, Paragon House, New York. ISBN 0-89226-049-1, pp. 145–161.
- The structure and evolution of the Taurid Complex (1991). Mon. Not. R. astr. Soc. 251, 632–648, with D. I. Steel and D. J. Asher.
- The Fundamental Role of Giant Comets in Earth History (1992). Celestial Mechanics and Dynamical Astronomy 54, 179–193.
- Hazards from Space: Comets in History and Science (1994). Chapter 7 in Glen, William (ed.) (1994). The Mass-extinction Debates: How Science Works in a Crisis, Stanford University Press. ISBN 0-8047-2285-4. pp. 152–169.
- Are Impacts Correlated in Time? (1994). In Gehrels, Tom (ed.) (1994). Hazards Due to Comets and Asteroids, University of Arizona Press. ISBN 0-8165-1505-0. pp. 463–478; with D.I. Steel, D.J. Asher and W.M. Napier.
- The Nature of Punctuational Crises and the Spenglerian Model of Civilization (1995). Vistas in Astronomy 39, 673–698.
- An Exceptional Cosmic Influence and its Bearing on the Evolution of Human Culture as Evident in the Apparent Early Development of Mathematics and Astronomy (2003). Astrophysics and Space Science 285, 521–532.
