= Henry H. Bauer =

Austrian academic journal editor (born 1931)

Henry Hermann Bauer (born November 16, 1931) is an emeritus professor of chemistry and science studies at Virginia Polytechnic Institute and State University (Virginia Tech). He is the author of several books and articles on fringe science, arguing in favor of the existence of the Loch Ness Monster and against Immanuel Velikovsky, and is an AIDS denialist. Following his retirement in 1999, he was editor-in-chief of the Journal of Scientific Exploration, a fringe science publication. Bauer also served as dean of the College of Arts and Sciences at Virginia Tech, generating controversy by criticising affirmative action.

== Life and work ==
Henry Bauer was born in Austria. As the Nazis came to power in German-speaking Europe, Bauer and his family emigrated to Australia. He attended Sydney Boys High School from 1943 to 1944. Bauer received his Ph.D. from the University of Sydney in Australia in 1956. He conducted post-doctoral research at the University of Michigan, then taught at Sydney and in Michigan. In 1966, he moved to a faculty position at the University of Kentucky. Bauer became dean of the School of Arts and Sciences at Virginia Polytechnic Institute and State University (Virginia Tech) in 1978, a position he held until 1986. Bauer was a professor of science studies and chemistry at Virginia Tech until his retirement in 1999. Bauer has had short-term teaching assignments at the University of Southampton and with a program of the Japan Society for the Promotion of Science: at the University of Kyoto and in 1974 at Sophia University and Rikagaku Kenkyusho.

Although trained as a chemist, Bauer's interests shifted in the late 1960s from electrochemistry to science studies, an interdisciplinary mix of history, philosophy, and sociology of science. His special interest is in what he calls "scientific unorthodoxies", like the Loch Ness Monster, Immanuel Velikovsky, and other topics. After retiring from Virginia Tech, Bauer became the editor of the Journal of Scientific Exploration, a publication devoted to fringe and non-mainstream science. He also wrote several books and maintains a website claiming that HIV is not the necessary and sufficient cause of AIDS (a position without scientific support that is known as AIDS denialism).

=== From chemistry to science studies ===
Bauer was trained as an electrochemist and reported his research in numerous publications during the 1950s and 60s. From the 1970s, although he remained a professor of chemistry in title, Bauer researched fringe science and pseudoscience topics. At Virginia Tech, Bauer was a founding member of a program for science studies. Bauer's book on science studies, Scientific Literacy and the Myth of the Scientific Method, was reviewed in Science and Nature. In his review in Public Understanding of Science, John Ziman called Bauer "a stalwart veteran" of science studies.

During his investigations of what constitutes pseudoscience, Bauer came to believe in the existence of the Loch Ness Monster, UFOs and other "scientific unorthodoxies". He compares the lack of acceptance of pseudoscientific beliefs by the scientific community to the persecution his family suffered at the hands of the Nazis, stating, "I guess I am kind of naturally contrary....I think you can make a pretty good case that it's not worth just accepting whatever is the standard."

=== Loch Ness Monster ===
Bauer developed an interest in the Loch Ness Monster and based his belief in the Monster's existence on a film made by prominent "Nessie" enthusiast Tim Dinsdale. The film purportedly shows an object, commonly thought to be a boat, moving in the Scottish lake. In the 1980s, Bauer researched and wrote a book on the Loch Ness Monster and the popular fascination with it. "The Enigma of Loch Ness" was reviewed favorably in Isis. Bauer maintains a website arguing that there is strong evidence for the existence of the monster, which he says the media have conspired to trivialize and sensationalize. During his tenure as professor at Virginia Tech, Bauer took over twenty trips to Loch Ness, searching for the monster.

In a news interview, Bauer commented on his belief in the Loch Ness Monster and how it has influenced his career: "I've been quite open about it....if I had been a biologist instead of a chemist, I couldn't have gotten away with it. People could smile and say, 'Well, he's got his hobbyhorse.'"

=== Immanuel Velikovsky ===
In his book, Beyond Velikovsky: The History of a Public Controversy, Henry Bauer criticizes the research of Immanuel Velikovsky, author of the pseudoscientific and pseudohistoric New York Times bestseller Worlds in Collision (1950). Time magazine refers to Bauer's book as "the definitive treatise debunking Immanuel Velikovsky." Bauer's book on Velikovsky was reviewed in Science, Nature, ISIS, and Journal for the History of Astronomy.

== Positions ==
=== Affirmative action and diversity programs ===
Bauer says he left the Dean's office at Virginia Tech "when political correctness arrived" in the 1980s. Bauer joined the National Association of Scholars, a politically conservative advocacy group opposing affirmative action, and started a newsletter for the group's Virginia branch. In "The Virginia Scholar," Bauer argues that the implementation of diversity programs led to a decline in academic standards. He characterizes such programs as promoting "feminoid sexists calling men sexist" and "racist black fanatics calling others racist."

Bauer opposed the formation of a police "Sensitive Crime Unit" meant to deal with sexual assault and hate crimes at Virginia Tech, suggesting that these issues were not a serious problem on campus and did not merit special attention. Bauer called the police unit a threat to free speech. He criticized Virginia Tech's creation of a new administrative position for multicultural affairs in response to racial incidents at the university in the mid-1990s as a wasteful allocation of resources. Bauer found fault with Virginia Tech's policy of excusing student absences for attending religious or ethnic observances. As black enrollment at Virginia Tech declined during the 1990s, Bauer stated that the university was already doing too much ("pulling out all the stops") to attract minority students, and should instead concentrate on raising academic standards.

=== Homosexuality ===
Bauer also drew criticism for his comments on homosexuality. In his pseudonymously written memoir To Rise Above Principle: The Memoirs of an Unreconstructed Dean, Bauer writes, "I regard homosexuality as an aberration or illness, not as an ‘equally valid life-style’ or whatever the current euphemism is." In his book, Bauer attributes the perceived problem of homosexuality to genetic, hereditary, and environmental factors, and suggests that the free speech and other civil rights of homosexuals should be withdrawn to prevent what Bauer views as the negative effects of homosexuality from spreading. Bauer has since stated he no longer holds this view, saying he had been "wrong" about the issue and had, in particular, mistakenly relied on the "naturalistic" fallacy that reduced culture and ethics to biology. AIDSTruth.org, an AIDS information resource, notes Bauer posted the statement one day after an account of his views appeared on their website.

=== AIDS ===
Several years after retiring from Virginia Tech, Bauer began to assert that there are "substantive grounds for doubting that HIV is the necessary and sufficient cause of AIDS and that antiretroviral treatment is unambiguously beneficial." In his 2007 book, The Origins, Persistence, and Failings of HIV/AIDS Theory, Bauer questions whether HIV exists, claiming that HIV tests are not accurate and that AIDS death statistics are exaggerated by mainstream media, scientists and pharmaceutical companies.

Bauer's beliefs on HIV/AIDS are rejected by the mainstream scientific community, based upon the substantial body of research confirming that HIV exists, is infectious, causes AIDS, and that HIV tests are accurate.

== Publications ==
=== Books ===
- (2017). Science Is Not What You Think: How It Has Changed, Why We Can't Trust It, How It Can Be Fixed. McFarland ISBN 9781476669106
- (2012). Dogmatism in Science and Medicine: How Dominant Theories Monopolize Research and Stifle the Search for Truth. McFarland ISBN 9780786463015
- (2007). The Origin, Persistence and Failings of HIV/AIDS Theory. McFarland ISBN 0-7864-3048-6
- (2001). Science or Pseudoscience: Magnetic Healing, Psychic Phenomena, and Other Heterodoxies. University of Illinois Press ISBN 0-252-02601-2
- (2001). Fatal Attractions: The Troubles with Science. Paraview Press ISBN 1-931044-28-7
- (1992). Scientific Literacy and the Myth of the Scientific Method. University of Illinois Press ISBN 0-252-06436-4
- (1988). To Rise Above Principle: The Memoirs of an Unreconstructed Dean. University of Illinois Press (under nom-de-plume ‘Josef Martin’) ISBN 0-252-01507-X
- (1986). Enigma of Loch Ness: Making Sense of a Mystery. University of Illinois Press. ISBN 0-252-01284-4
- (1984). Beyond Velikovsky: The History of a Public Controversy, Univ. of Illinois Press. ISBN 0-252-01104-X

=== Papers ===
- Henry H. Bauer (2002). "The Case for the Loch Ness "Monster": The Scientific Evidence". Journal of Scientific Exploration. 16 (2). Society for Scientific Exploration: 225–246.
- Henry H. Bauer (2002). "Common Knowledge about the Loch Ness Monster: Television, Videos, and Films" (PDF). Journal of Scientific Exploration. 16 (3). Society for Scientific Exploration: 455–477.
- Henry H. Bauer (2002). "'Pathological Science' is not Scientific Misconduct (nor is it pathological) (Part of the special issue on Ethics of Chemistry, 2)". International Journal for Philosophy of Chemistry. 8 (1). HYLE Publications, Karlsruhe: 5–20. ISSN 1433-5158.
- Henry H. Bauer (1995-01-09). "Book Review of Wilhelm Reich's "Beyond Psychology"". Skeptical Inquirer. Committee for the Scientific Investigation of Claims of the Paranormal. Archived from the original on January 18, 2008.
- Henry H. Bauer (Winter 2007). "Questioning HIV/AIDS: Morally Reprehensible or Scientifically Warranted?" (PDF). Journal of American Physicians and Surgeons. 12 (4). Association of American Physicians and Surgeons.
- Henry H. Bauer (June 2002). "Toby Smith: Little Gray Men: Roswell and the Rise of a Popular Culture". Isis. 93 (2): 354–355. doi:10.1086/345050.
- Bauer, Henry H (Summer 2003). "The Progress of Science and Implications for Science Studies and for Science Policy". Perspectives on Science. 11 (2). The MIT Press: 236–278. doi:10.1162/106361403322495902. S2CID 57566740.
