= Pleochroic halo =

Geological phenomenon

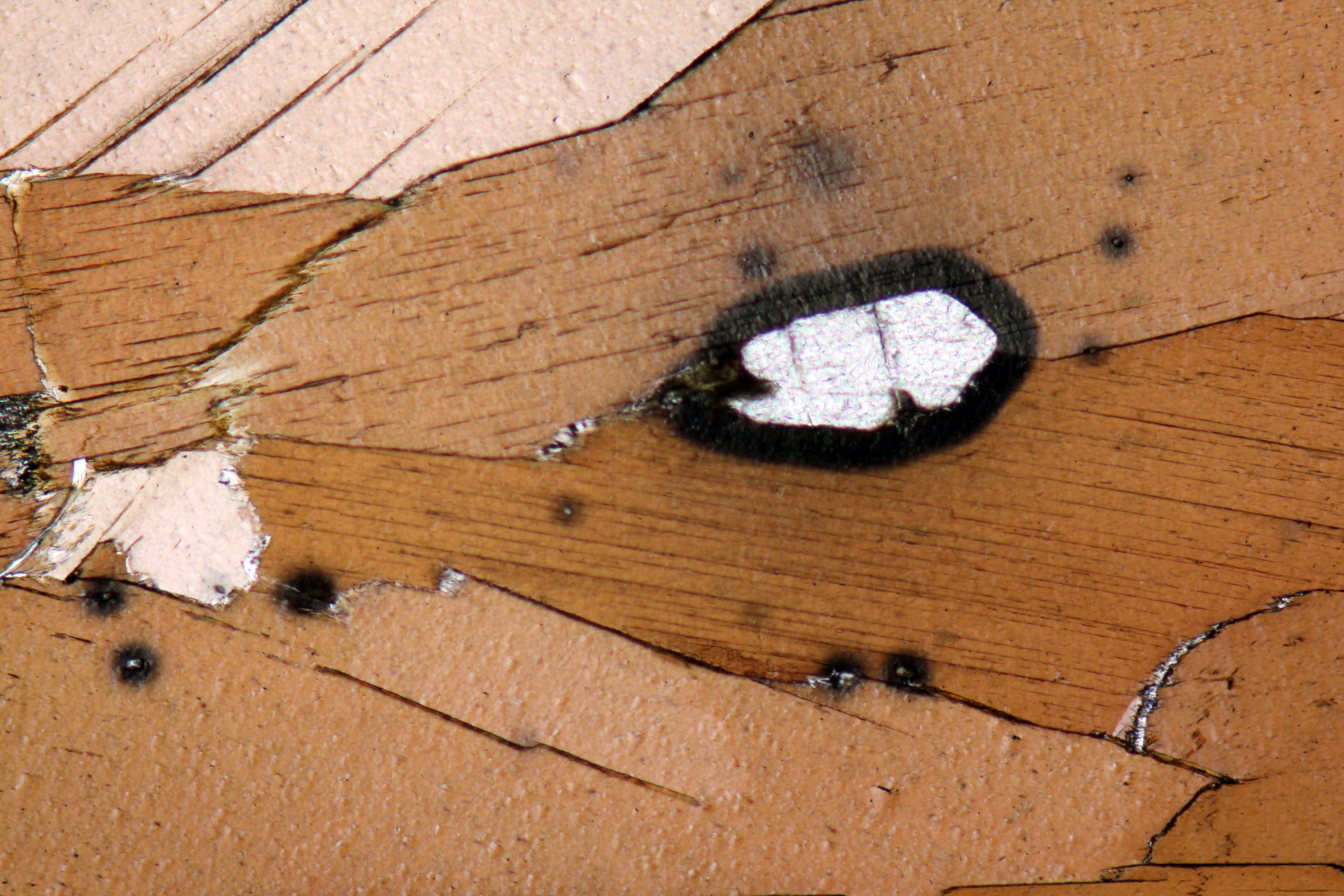
Pleochroic halos around crystals of zircons in a sample of biotite

A pleochroic halo, or radiohalo, is a microscopic, spherical shell of discolouration (pleochroism) within minerals such as biotite that occurs in granite and other igneous rocks. The halo is a zone of radiation damage caused by the inclusion of minute radioactive crystals within the host crystal structure. The inclusions are typically zircon, apatite, or titanite which can accommodate uranium or thorium within their crystal structures. One explanation is that the discolouration is caused by alpha particles emitted by the nuclei; the radius of the concentric shells are proportional to the particles' energy.

== Production ==
Uranium-238 follows a sequence of decay through thorium, radium, radon, polonium, and lead. These are the alpha-emitting isotopes in the sequence. (Because of their continuous energy distribution and greater range, beta particles cannot form distinct rings.)

Isotope	Half-life	Energy in MeV
U-238	4.47×10^{9} years	4.196
U-234	2.455×10^{5} years	4.776
Th-230	75,400 years	4.6876
Ra-226	1,599 years	4.784
Rn-222	3.823 days	5.4897
Po-218	3.04 minutes	5.181
Po-214	163.7 microseconds	7.686
Po-210	138.4 days	5.304
Pb-206	stable	0

The final characteristics of a pleochroic halo depends upon the initial isotope, and the size of each ring of a halo is dependent upon the alpha decay energy. A pleochroic halo formed from U-238 has theoretically eight concentric rings, with five actually distinguishable under a lighted microscope, while a halo formed from polonium has only one, two, or three rings depending on which isotope the starting material is. In U-238 haloes, U-234, and Ra-226 rings coincide with the Th-230 to form one ring; Rn-222 and Po-210 rings also coincide to form one ring. These rings are indistinguishable from one another under a petrographic microscope.
