= Catastrophism =

Geological theory of abrupt, severe change

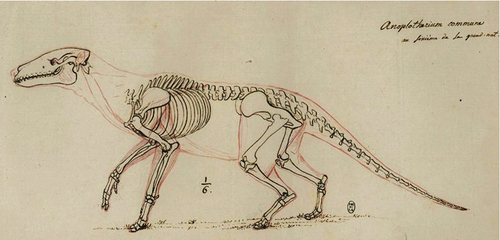
The discoveries of different layers of fossils, such as those containing Palaeotherium and Anoplotherium (pictured), by Georges Cuvier led him to believe that series of catastrophic events wiped out worlds before the modern one.

In geology, catastrophism is the theory that the Earth has largely been shaped by sudden, short-lived, violent events, possibly worldwide in scope. This contrasts with uniformitarianism (sometimes called gradualism), according to which slow incremental changes, such as erosion, brought about all the Earth's geological features. The proponents of uniformitarianism held that the present was "the key to the past", and that all geological processes (such as erosion) throughout the past resembled those that can be observed today. Since the 19th-century disputes between catastrophists and uniformitarians, a more inclusive and integrated view of geologic events has developed, in which the scientific consensus accepts that some catastrophic events occurred in the geologic past, but regards these as extreme examples of explicable natural processes.

Proponents of catastrophism proposed that each geological epoch ended with violent and sudden natural catastrophes such as major floods and the rapid formation of major mountain chains. Plants and animals living in the parts of the world where such events occurred became extinct, to be replaced abruptly by the new forms whose fossils defined the geological strata. Some catastrophists attempted to relate at least one such change to the Biblical account of Noah's flood.

The French scientist Georges Cuvier (1769–1832) popularised the concept of catastrophism in the early 19th century; he proposed that new life-forms had moved in from other areas after local floods, and avoided religious or metaphysical speculation in his scientific writings.

== History ==
=== Geology and biblical beliefs ===
In the early development of geology, efforts were made in a predominantly Christian western society to reconcile biblical narratives of Creation and the universal flood with new concepts about the processes which had formed the Earth. The discovery of other ancient flood myths was taken as explaining why the flood story was "stated in scientific methods with surprising frequency among the Greeks", an example being Plutarch's account of the Ogygian flood.

=== Cuvier and the natural theologians ===
The leading scientific proponent of catastrophism in the early nineteenth century was the French anatomist and paleontologist Georges Cuvier. His motivation was to explain the patterns of extinction and faunal succession that he and others were observing in the fossil record. While he did speculate that the catastrophe responsible for the most recent extinctions in Eurasia might have been the result of the inundation of low-lying areas by the sea, he did not make any reference to Noah's flood. Nor did he ever make any reference to divine creation as the mechanism by which repopulation occurred following the extinction event. In fact Cuvier, influenced by the ideas of the Enlightenment and the intellectual climate of the French Revolution, avoided religious or metaphysical speculation in his scientific writings. Cuvier also believed that the stratigraphic record indicated that there had been several of these revolutions, which he viewed as recurring natural events, amid long intervals of stability during the history of life on Earth. This led him to believe the Earth was several million years old.

By contrast in Britain, where natural theology was influential during the early nineteenth century, a group of geologists including William Buckland and Robert Jameson interpreted Cuvier's work differently. Cuvier had written an introduction to a collection of his papers on fossil quadrupeds, discussing his ideas on catastrophic extinction. Jameson translated Cuvier's introduction into English, publishing it under the title Theory of the Earth. He added extensive editorial notes to the translation, explicitly linking the latest of Cuvier's revolutions with the biblical flood. The resulting essay was extremely influential in the English-speaking world. Buckland spent much of his early career trying to demonstrate the reality of the biblical flood using geological evidence. He frequently cited Cuvier's work, even though Cuvier had proposed an inundation of limited geographic extent and extended duration, whereas Buckland, to be consistent with the biblical account, was advocating a universal flood of short duration. Eventually, Buckland abandoned flood geology in favor of the glaciation theory advocated by Louis Agassiz, following a visit to the Alps where Agassiz demonstrated the effects of glaciation at first hand. As a result of the influence of Jameson, Buckland, and other advocates of natural theology, the nineteenth century debate over catastrophism took on much stronger religious overtones in Britain than elsewhere in Europe.

=== The rise of uniformitarianism in geology ===
Uniformitarian explanations for the formation of sedimentary rock and an understanding of the immense stretch of geological time or, as the concept came to be known, deep time, were found in the writing of James Hutton, sometimes known as the father of geology, in the late 18th century. The geologist Charles Lyell built upon Hutton's ideas during the first half of 19th century and amassed observations in support of the uniformitarian idea that the Earth's features had been shaped by same geological processes that could be observed in the present acting gradually over an immense period of time. Lyell presented his ideas in the influential three volume work, Principles of Geology, published in the 1830s, which challenged theories about geological cataclysms proposed by proponents of catastrophism like Cuvier and Buckland. One of the key differences between catastrophism and uniformitarianism is that uniformitarianism requires vast timelines for continued processes, whereas catastrophism accepts that there appeared to have been abrupt changes. Today most geologists combine catastrophist and uniformitarianist standpoints, taking the view that Earth's history is a slow, gradual story punctuated by occasional natural catastrophic events that have affected Earth and its inhabitants.

From around 1850 to 1980, most geologists endorsed uniformitarianism ("The present is the key to the past") and gradualism (geologic change occurs slowly over long periods of time) and rejected the idea that cataclysmic events such as earthquakes, volcanic eruptions, or floods of vastly greater power than those observed at the present time, played any significant role in the formation of the Earth's surface. Instead they believed that the Earth had been shaped by the long term action of forces such as volcanism, earthquakes, erosion, and sedimentation, that could still be observed in action today. In part, the geologists' rejection was fostered by their impression that the catastrophists of the early nineteenth century believed that God was directly involved in determining the history of Earth. Some of the theories about Catastrophism in the nineteenth and early twentieth centuries were connected with religion and catastrophic origins were sometimes considered miraculous rather than natural events.

The rise in uniformitarianism made the introduction of a new catastrophe theory very difficult. In 1923 J Harlen Bretz published a paper on the channeled scablands formed by glacial Lake Missoula in Washington State, USA. Bretz encountered resistance to his theories from the geology establishment of the day, kicking off an acrimonious 40 year debate. Finally in 1979 Bretz received the Penrose Medal; the Geological Society of America's highest award.

=== Immanuel Velikovsky's views ===
In the 1950s, Immanuel Velikovsky propounded catastrophism in several popular books. He speculated that the planet Venus is a former "comet" which was ejected from Jupiter and subsequently 3,500 years ago made two catastrophic close passes by Earth, 52 years apart, and later interacted with Mars, which then had a series of near collisions with Earth which ended in 687 BCE, before settling into its current orbit. Velikovsky used this to explain the biblical plagues of Egypt, the biblical reference to the "Sun standing still" for a day (Joshua 10:12 & 13, explained by changes in Earth's rotation), and the sinking of Atlantis. Scientists vigorously rejected Velikovsky's conjectures.

== Current application ==
Neocatastrophism is the explanation of sudden extinctions in the palaeontological record by high magnitude, low frequency events (such as asteroid impacts, super-volcanic eruptions, supernova gamma ray bursts, etc.), as opposed to the more prevalent geomorphological thought which emphasises low magnitude, high frequency events.

=== Luis Alvarez impact event hypothesis ===
In 1980, Walter and Luis Alvarez published a paper suggesting that a 10 kilometres (6.2 mi) asteroid struck Earth 66 million years ago at the end of the Cretaceous period. The impact wiped out about 70% of all species, including the non-avian dinosaurs, leaving behind the Cretaceous–Paleogene boundary (K–T boundary). In 1990, a 180 kilometres (110 mi) candidate crater marking the impact was identified at Chicxulub in the Yucatán Peninsula of Mexico. These events sparked a wide acceptance of a scientifically based catastrophism with regard to certain events in the distant past.

Since then, the debate about the extinction of the dinosaurs and other mass extinction events has centered on whether the extinction mechanism was the asteroid impact, widespread volcanism (which occurred about the same time), or some other mechanism or combination. Most of the mechanisms suggested are catastrophic in nature.

The observation of the Shoemaker-Levy 9 cometary collision with Jupiter illustrated that catastrophic events occur as natural events.

=== Moon-formation ===
Modern theories also suggest that Earth's anomalously large moon was formed catastrophically. In a paper published in Icarus in 1975, William K. Hartmann and Donald R. Davis proposed that a catastrophic near-miss by a large planetesimal early in Earth's formation approximately 4.5 billion years ago blew out rocky debris, remelted Earth and formed the Moon, thus explaining the Moon's lesser density and lack of an iron core. The impact theory does have some faults; some computer simulations show the formation of a ring or multiple moons post impact, and elements are not quite the same between the Earth and Moon.

== See also ==
- Alternatives to evolution by natural selection
- Clarence King
- Flood basalt
- Glacial lake outburst flood
- History of geology
- History of paleontology
- Megatsunami
- Pensée (Immanuel Velikovsky Reconsidered)
- Punctuated equilibrium
- Supervolcano
- Uniformitarianism
- Volcanic winter
- Zanclean flood

== Sources ==
- King, Clarence (1877). "Catastrophism and Evolution". The American Naturalist. 11 (8): 449–470. Bibcode:1877ANat...11..449K. doi:10.1086/271929.
- Rudwick, Martin J. S. (1972). The Meaning of Fossils. Chicago, Illinois: University of Chicago Press. ISBN 0-226-73103-0.
- McGowan, Christopher (2001). The Dragon Seekers. Cambridge, Massachusetts: Perseus Publishing. ISBN 0-7382-0282-7.
