= Henry Dawson Lowry =

English journalist, fiction writer and poet (1869–1906)

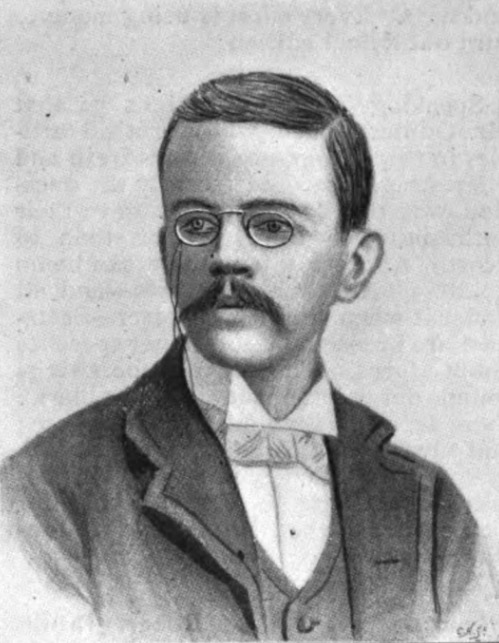
- Lowry, c. 1895
- Born: 22 February 1869; Truro, Cornwall, England
- Died: 21 October 1906 (aged 37); Herne Hill, England
- Education: Queen's College, Taunton; University of Oxford
- Occupations: Journalist, short-story writer, novelist, and poet
- Writing career
- Pen name: The Impenitent

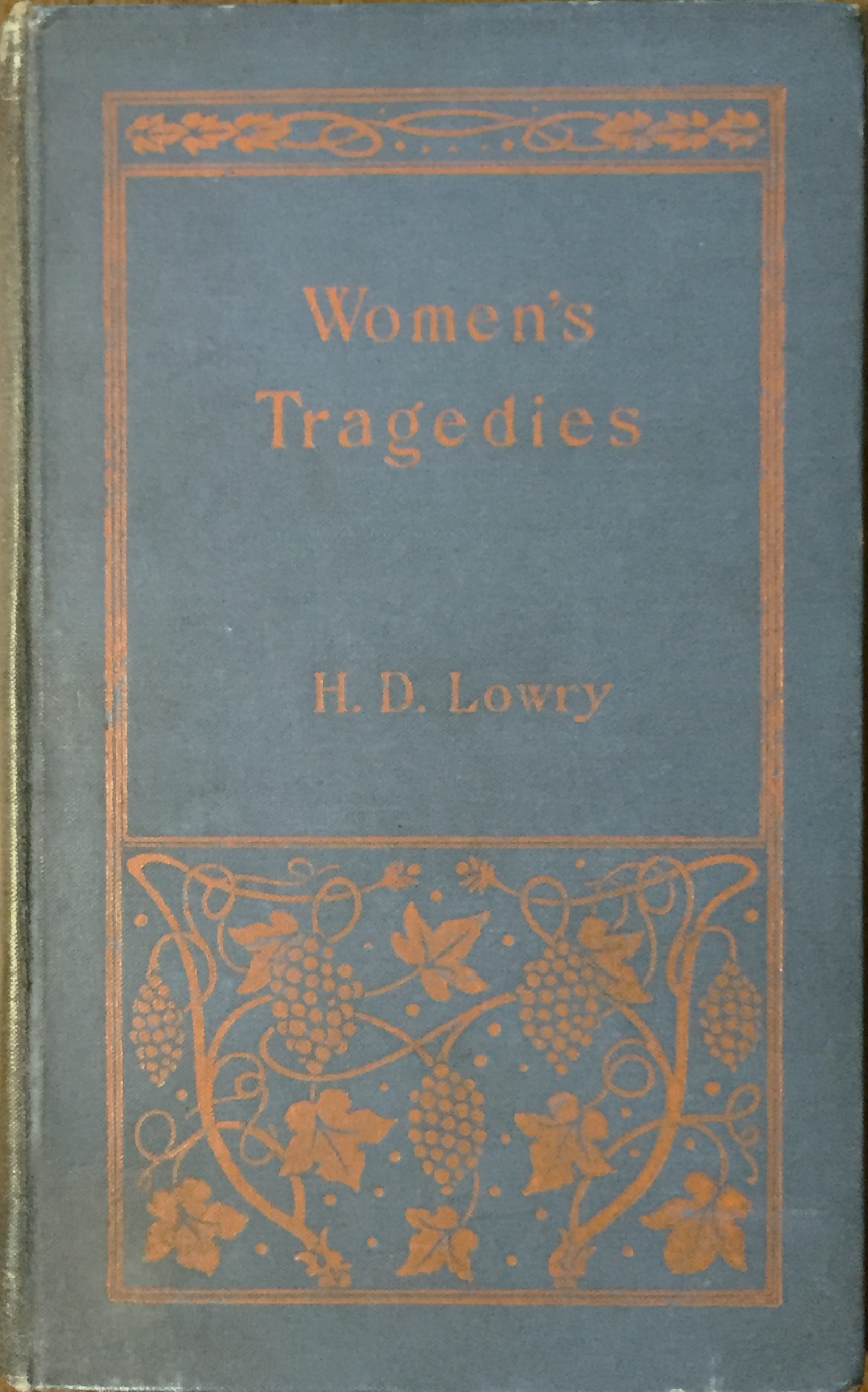

Henry Dawson Lowry (22 February 1869 – 21 October 1906) was an English journalist, short story writer, novelist and poet, writing as H. D. Lowry.

== Early life ==
Lowry was born at Truro, Cornwall, England, as the eldest son of Thomas Shaw Lowry, bank clerk at Truro, afterwards bank manager at Camborne, by his wife Winifred Dawson of Redhill. Catherine Amy Dawson Scott was his cousin. Educated at Queen's College, Taunton, and then at the University of Oxford (unattached to a particular Oxford college) with B.A. degree in chemistry in 1891.

== Writing and career ==
In 1891, Lowry's Cornish stories were accepted by W. E. Henley for publication in the National Observer and a number of his subsequent novels focussed on life in Cornwall. Two years later, in 1893 Lowry took up residence in London and wrote for the Pall Mall Gazette, becoming a staff member in 1895. Subsequent to this, Lowry was on the staff of Black and White magazine from 1895 to 1897.

Early in 1897, Lowry became the editor of the Ludgate Magazine and later in the year joined the staff of the Morning Post. In his career at the Pall Mall Gazette, Black and White, Ludgate Magazine, and the Morning Post, Lowry worked closely with James Nicol Dunn and Lowry dedicated his 1895 book Women's Tragedies to Dunn. Lowry wrote under the pseudonym "The Impenitent" for the Daily Express and occasionally contributed to other newspapers and magazines.

In 1896, Lowry was the subject of a pencil drawing by Australian artist Percy Spence that is now held at the National Portrait Gallery.

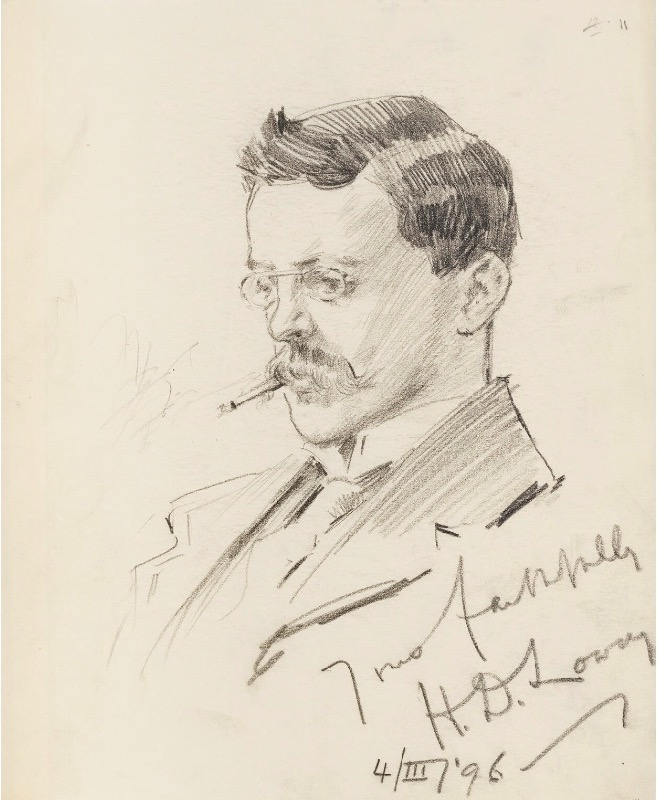
Pencil sketch of Lowry by Percy Spence (1896).

== Later life and legacy ==
Lowry was consistently sickly throughout his life and died at his home at Herne Hill, south London, of pneumonia on 22 October 1906, aged 37, and is buried in a graveyard in Norwood, London. In 1912, Edgar Preston wrote a memoir of Lowry in A Dream of Daffodils; Last Poems by H. D. Lowry, where he described Lowry thus: "his whole story was composed of a few small volumes of verse, some earnest friendships, one passion, and a premature death".

Lowry's cousin Catherine Amy Dawson Scott, who did some editing of his poetry, used text by Lowry adapting one of her own novels (The Haunting, 1921) into the libretto for the opera Gale by Ethel Leginska, which premiered in Chicago at the Civic Opera House, with John Charles Thomas in the lead, on 23 November 1935.

== Selected works ==
- Wreckers and Methodists, and Other Stories. London: William Heinemann, 1893. Published in USA as Prisoners of the Earth and Other Stories, New York: Dodd, Mead and Company, 1893. Contains 23 short stories.
- Women's Tragedies. London: John Lane; Boston: Roberts Bros., 1895. Keynotes Series Vol. IX; cover and title-page designs by Aubrey Beardsley. Contains fifteen short stories.
- A Man of Moods. B. Sands. 1896.
- Make-Believe. John Lane. 1896. Illustrated by Charles Robinson.
- The Happy Exile. John Lane. 1898.
- The Hundred Windows. Elkin Mathews. 1904; a book of poems
- A Dream of Daffodils; Last Poems by H.D. Lowry ... Arranged for the press by G.E. Matheson & C.A. Dawson Scott. With a memoir by Edgar A. Preston. G.J. Glaisher. 1912.
- Wheal Darkness by H. D. Lowry and C. A. Dawson Scott (London: Hutchinson and Co., n.d). An unfinished work of Lowry's completed by his cousin Catherine Amy Dawson Scott.
