= James Nicol Dunn =

Scottish journalist and newspaper editor

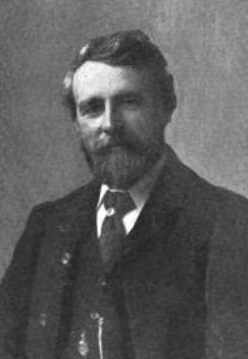
- In The Sketch, 1 January 1902
- Born: 12 October 1856; Kincardineshire, Scotland
- Died: 30 June 1919 (aged 62); Denmark Hill, London, England
- Citizenship: British
- Occupation: Journalist
- Writing career
- Language: English
- Period: 1888–1919

James Nicol Dunn (12 October 1856 – 30 June 1919) was a Scottish journalist and newspaper editor, best known as the editor of London newspaper The Morning Post from 1897 to 1905 and as London editor of the Glasgow Evening News from 1914 until his death in 1919.

== Early life ==
Dunn was born in Kincardineshire on 12 October 1856, the eldest son of Joseph Dunn and Margaret Dunn (née Macleod). Dunn was educated at Aberdeen, initially intending to study law, but work on journals and magazines while still a student encouraged him to enter journalism instead.

== Journalism ==
Dunn had a varied career as a journalist across various newspapers and magazines in Scotland, England and South Africa until his death in 1919, "Moving between the metropolis and the provinces so as to belong almost equally to both." Dunn's career in journalism began in Scotland, first with the Dundee Advertiser (which he joined before he turned twenty) and later on as a member of the Glasgow and West Scotland staff of The Scotsman. In 1888, he became the managing editor of the Scots Observer in 1888, which in 1889 became the National Observer, following the newspaper's move from Edinburgh to London. Dunn remained in this role "in its prime" under editor William Ernest Henley until 1893 when he resigned to join the staff of The Pall Mall Gazette.

From 1895 to 1897, Dunn was the editor of two periodicals, the Black & White, a British illustrated weekly, and The Ludgate Monthly, a London-based monthly, which published short fiction and articles of general interest. From 1897 to 1905, Dunn was editor of the London newspaper The Morning Post, a conservative London-based daily whose editorship "was marked by such an advance in the political weight of that paper." The Morning Post, before and after Dunn, had a reputation as "one of the great organs of opinion on the Conservative side" but it was during Dunn's reign that it "gained a tremendous Vogue", or popularity, through its coverage of the Second Boer War by the then-young journalist Winston Churchill.

In 1904, Dunn was elected President of the Institute of Journalists (now the Chartered Institute of Journalists), the oldest professional association for journalists. Dunn was President during "a rather stormy period" of the Institute but "by his urbanity and good humour, weathered a difficult situation, to the complete satisfaction of every one who had to work with him." It was also around this time that Dunn was involved with Quiz, Art and Literature, and The Pen and Pencil.

In 1905, Lord Northcliffe purchased the Manchester Courier, a daily newspaper published in Manchester and rival to the better-known Manchester Guardian (now The Guardian), and installed Dunn as editor "with a big fanfare of trumpets and a large ceremonial lunch". Northcliffe's adventures in northern newspapers were ultimately unsuccessful. Dunn served as editor from 1905 and 1910, and in 1916 the newspaper ceased publication.

In January 1911, Dunn departed for South Africa where he became editor of the Johannesburg Star from 1911 to 1914.

Dunn returned to Britain in 1914, where he served as London editor for the Glasgow Evening News from 1914 throughout the First World War and until his death in Denmark Hill, London, on 30 June 1919. Dunn's hobbies included chess and golf and he was a member of various private members' clubs including the London Press Club, the Yorick, the Cecil Club, and the Savage Club.

== Literature ==
As a journalist and editor, Dunn was in regular correspondence, and worked closely with, various writers during his career in London from the late 1880s to the early 1900s, a time when literary writings frequently featured in periodicals and there was much crossover between the worlds of literature and journalism. In his career at The Pall Mall Gazette, Black and White, Ludgate Magazine, and The Morning Post in the 1890s and 1900s, Dunn worked closely with English journalist, short story writer, novelist and poet Henry Dawson Lowry and Lowry dedicated his 1895 book Women's Tragedies to Dunn.

In late 1888, shortly after Dunn moved with the retitled National Observer to London, Oscar Wilde sent Dunn a poem, Symphony in Yellow, inspired by a yellow omnibus (bus) slowly traversing Blackfriars Bridge in London one foggy day in late 1888. According to Wilde, Dunn was "quite charmed" but was unsure about publication. In December 1888, Wilde requested the return of the poem if it were not to be published in the National Observer and instead it was first published in Centennial Magazine in February 1889.

In 1895 and shortly after becoming editor of Black & White, Dunn sought out writings from American journalist and novelist Harold Frederic. In 1896, English author, poet and dramatist Eden Phillpotts dedicated his book My Laughing Philosopher to Dunn. Dunn is also known to have corresponded with J. M. Barrie, creator of Peter Pan, as well as English poet, playwright, novelist, and critic Algernon Charles Swinburne, and Irish poet and author W. B. Yeats.

More generally, Dunn was friends with Thomas Hardy and indeed one at least one occasion holidayed with him, and also had a minor acquaintance with H. G. Wells.

== Legacy ==
Dunn was a prolific correspondent and his letters survive in archives at Yale University, University of Edinburgh, Leeds University, the British Library, and National Library of Scotland. He is the subject of eight photographic portraits, one by Frederic G. Hodsoll and seven - possibly a series - by Henry Walter Barnett, held by the National Portrait Gallery.

Dunn was described in the Dictionary of Nineteenth-century Journalism in Great Britain and Ireland as: "although Dunn's career seems full and varied, he remains a shadowy figure in the history of journalism."
