= René Bull =

Irish illustrator and photographer

Playbill for René Bull's illustrated lecture at the Theatre Royal in Exeter on 20 October 1900.

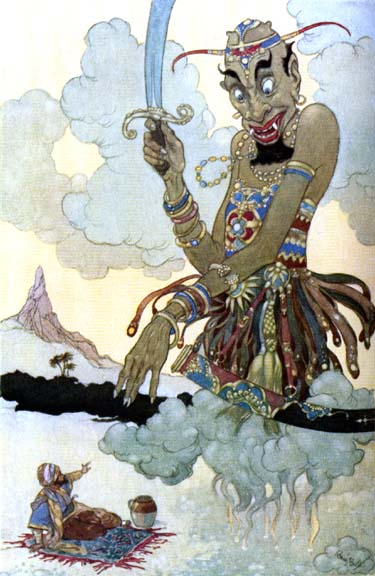
1898 illustration of The Fisherman and the Jinni

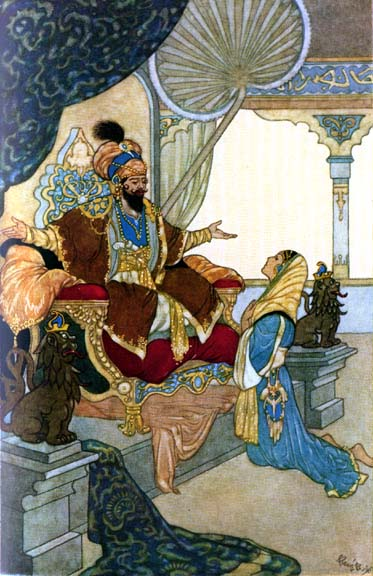
1898 illustration for The Arabian Nights

René Bull was an Irish illustrator and photographer. He was born in Dublin on 11 December 1872 to a French mother and an English father. He went to Paris to study engineering, but embarked on an artistic career after meeting and taking drawing lessons from the French satirist and political cartoonist Caran d'Ache (Emmanuel Poiré). Bull returned to Ireland to contribute sketches and political cartoons to various publications, including the Weekly Freeman.

Moving to London in 1892, Bull drew for "Illustrated Brits" and created cartoons in the style of Caran d'Ache for Pick-Me-Up from 1893. In 1896, Bull joined Black and White illustrated newspaper as a special artist and photographer. In 1898, he covered the Tirah Campaign in India and went on to Sudan for the campaign culminating in the Battle of Omdurman. He went to South Africa to record the Boer War until the relief of Ladysmith in March 1900. As he was wounded in 1900, Bull was invalided out.

He settled in England and drew cartoons for such magazines as Bystander, Chums, London Opinion, Lika Joko. In The Sketch, Bull created cartoons of humorous inventions, predating those of William Heath Robinson. From 1905 he illustrated books, starting with an edition of Jean de La Fontaine's Fables. Other major titles he illustrated included The Arabian Nights (1912), Rubáiyát of Omar Khayyám (1913), The Russian Ballet (1913), Carmen (1915), Andersen's Fairy Tales. In 1914, Bull joined the Royal Naval Volunteer Reserve as a lieutenant and was eventually transferred to the Royal Air Force where he reached the rank of Major. In World War II Bull joined the Air Ministry for technical duties. He died on 14 March 1942.

== Illustrated books ==
- Jean de La Fontaine – Fables (Nelson, 1905)
- Frank A. Saville – Fate's Intruder: A Novel (Heinemann, 1905)
- Joel Chandler Harris – Uncle Remus (Nelson, 1906)
- The Arabian Nights (Constable, 1912)
- A. E. Johnson – The Russian Ballet (Constable, 1913)
- Rubaiyat of Omar Khayyam (Hodder, 1913)
- Prosper Mérimée (Trans. A. E. Johnson) – Carmen (Hutchinson, 1915)
- Herbert Strang – The Old Man Of The Mountain (Hodder, 1916)
- Jonathan Swift – Gulliver's Travels (1928)
- Rose Fyleman – A Garland of Roses: Collected Poems (Methuen, 1928)
- Hans Christian Andersen – Fairy Tales (Clowes, c. 1928)
- Joel Chandler Harris – Brer Rabbit Plays (Retold by Elizabeth Fleming) (Nelson, 1930)
- Jean de La Fontaine – Fables: A Selection (Trans. Shirley Edward) (1935)
- Zoo Friends (Blackie, 1939)
- Various – The Children's Golden Treasure Book of 1939

== Contributions ==
- Black and White (1892)
- Chums (1892)
- Pall Mall Budget (1893)
- ILN (1893)
- St. Paul's (1894)
- Lika Joko (1894)
- English Illustrated Magazine (1894–96)
- Pick-Me-Up: The New Budget (1895)
- The Sketch (1895–1918)
- The Ludgate Monthly (c. 1896)
- The Bystander (1904)
- Punch (1906–07)
