= H. B. Marriott Watson =

English novelist, playwright, and journalist

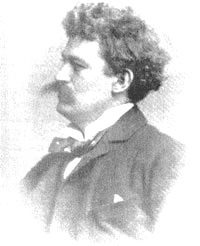
- Born: Henry Brereton Marriott Watson; 20 December 1863; Caulfield, Melbourne, Australia
- Died: 30 October 1921 (aged 57); England
- Occupations: Writer, novelist, journalist, editor
- Spouse: Rosamund Ball (1894–1911; her death)
- Children: 1
- Writing career
- Pen name: H.B. Marriott Watson
- Genres: Fiction, adventure fiction, fantasy fiction, historical fiction, horror fiction, mystery fiction, romance fiction, non-fiction, essay, literary criticism

Henry Brereton Marriott Watson (20 December 1863 – 30 October 1921), known by his pen name H. B. Marriott Watson, was an Australian-born British novelist, journalist, playwright, and short-story writer. He worked for the St James's Gazette, was assistant editor of the Black and White and Pall Mall Gazette, and staff member on W. E. Henley's National Observer.

Marriott Watson was a popular author during his lifetime, best known for his swashbuckling, historical and romance fiction, and had over forty novels published between 1888 and 1919; these included seventeen short story collections and one collection of essays. He was a longtime resident of New Zealand, living there from 1872 to 1885, and often used his childhood home as the setting for many of his novels.

He and his common law wife, English poet Rosamund Marriott Watson, were well known in Britain's literary circles and were associated with many fellow writers of the period including J. M. Barrie, Stephen Crane, Thomas Hardy, Henry James and H. G. Wells among others. Their first and only son, Richard Marriott Watson, was also a noted poet and one of many sons of literary figures killed during the First World War.

Although now largely forgotten, Marriott Watson's contribution to Gothic horror during the latter part of the nineteenth century is notable for its romantic decadence. The stories which appeared in such collections as Diogenes of London (1893) and The Heart of Miranda (1898) bear favourable comparison with those produced by fellow contemporaries Arthur Machen, Vincent O'Sullivan and M. P. Shiel.

== Biography ==
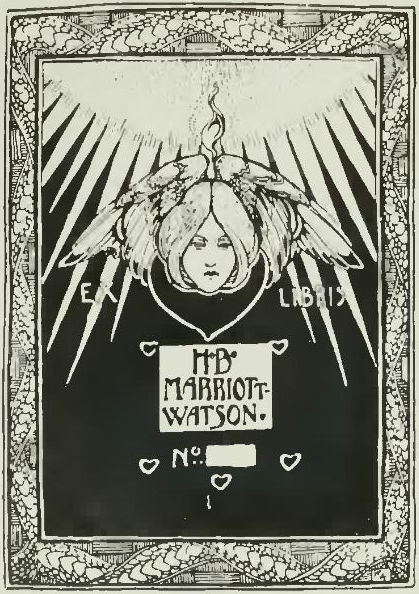
Bookplate of H. B. Marriott Watson

Henry Brereton Marriott Watson was born in Caulfield, Melbourne, Australia to Henry Crocker Marriott Watson and Annie McDonald Wright. His father was an Anglican priest and spent nine years traveling with him as he took up various ministries throughout Victoria. He and his family moved to New Zealand in 1872 when his father accepted a position at St John's in Christchurch. Marriott Watson spent much of his childhood there and would later use it as a setting for many of his novels.

Educated at Christ Church Grammar School and Canterbury College, Marriott Watson left for England in 1885 to become a journalist. He later worked for the St James's Gazette, was an assistant editor for both the Black and White and the Pall Mall Gazette and was a staff member of the National Observer under W.E. Henley. It was while working for the National Observer that Marriott introduced Henley to H. G. Wells. While an editor, he gained a considerable number of publishing and literary contacts. A member of the Savile Club, he was invited by fellow editor Frank Harris to meet with members of The Saturday Review such as Mrs. Roy Devereux, Harold Frederic and Bernard Shaw when they had their weekly lunch meetings at the famed Cafe Royale. The publication was one of the first to review his first novel, Marahuna (1888), which helped to encourage his career as a professional writer. He also co-wrote a stage production of Richard Savage with J. M. Barrie which premiered at London's Criterion Theatre in 1891.

In 1894, the English poet Rosamund Tomson left her husband, artist Arthur Graham Tomson, and eloped with Marriott Watson; their first and only son Richard was born on 6 October 1895. This resulted in a scandal, one which included the sudden changing of her established pen name from Graham R. Tomson to Rosamund Marriott Watson to honor her third husband, and cancelling a then forthcoming volume of poems. Her career subsequently suffered as many publishers avoided working with her in future. Rosamund and Arthur Tomson officially divorced two years later and for the rest of her life she remained with Marriott Watson as his common law wife.

Marriott Watson continued writing novels throughout the 1890s. Many of these were swashbuckling, historical and romance fiction, however he also tried his hand at writing supernatural and Gothic horror stories during this period. They were published in the form of short stories and published in Diogenes of London (1893) and The Heart of Miranda (1898), however one of his most memorable was the vampire story The Stone Chamber published only a year after Bram Stoker's Dracula.

After the death of writer Stephen Crane in 1900, his companion Cora asked that Marriott Watson complete his unfinished novel The O'Ruddy, but he declined the offer. He had been a longtime friend and collaborator with Crane, having been the first to review his novel The Red Badge of Courage five years before with what was considered to have been one of the earliest and most influential of its English reviews. Marriott Watson had also made a cryptographic contribution to Crane's story The Ghost (1899), and the character of Miranda was partially influenced by Marriott Watson's own Heart of Miranda.

When Rosamund died in 1911, Marriott Watson tried to keep her work alive in the literary world; his novel Rosalind in Arden (1913) contained many references to her poetry. He also published an account of alleged contact with her, via a seance with a medium, and later converted to spiritualism. Their only son Richard, an officer serving with the 2nd Royal Irish Rifles, was killed on 24 March 1918, during the retreat from St Quentin. He reportedly never recovered from the loss, becoming a heavy drinker in his final years, and died from cirrhosis of the liver at the age of 57.

== Bibliography ==
- Marahuna (1888)
- Lady Faintheart (1890)
- The Web of the Spider (1891)
- Diogenes of London (1893)
- At the First Corner (1895)
- Galloping Dick (1896)
- The Heart of Miranda (1897)
- The Adventurers: A Tale of Treasure Trove (1898)
- The Princess Xenia (1899)
- The Rebel (1900)
- Chloris of the Island (1900)
- The House Divided (1901)
- Godfrey Merivale (1902)
- Alarums and Excursions (1903)
- Captain Fortune (1904)
- Hurricane Island (1904)
- The Skirts of Happy Chance (1905)
- Twisted Eglantine (1905)
- A Midsummer Day's Dream (1906)
- The Privateers (1907)
- A Poppy Show (1908)
- Lives of the Highwaymen (1908)
- The Golden Precipice (1908)
- The High Toby (1910)
- Smugglarbandet (1910)
- The King's Highway (1910)
- At a Venture (1911)
- Godfrey Merivale (1912)
- The Big Fish (1912)
- Couch Fires and Primrose Ways (1912)
- The Tomboy and Others (1912)
- Ifs and Ans (1913)
- Across the Barrier (1913)
- Rosalind in Arden (1913)
- Once Upon a Time (1914)
- Chapman's Wares (1915)
- The Privateers (1915)
- As It Chanced (1916)
- Mulberry Wharf (1917)
- The Affair on the Island (1918)
- The Web of the Spider (1918)
- Aftermath (1919)
- The Excelsior (1919)

=== Articles ===
- "Fiction in 1902," The Pall Mall Magazine, Vol. XXIX, January/April 1903.
- "Robert Louis Stevenson: An Appreciation," The Fortnightly Review, September 1903.
- “The Deleterious Effect of Americanization Upon Woman,” The Nineteenth Century and After, Vol. LIV, July/December 1903.
- "Old Magazines," T. P. Weekly, Vol. III, April 1904.
- "The American Woman – An Analyses,” The Nineteenth Century and After, Vol. LVI, July/December 1904.

=== Short stories ===
- "The House of Shame," The Yellow Book, Vol. IV, January 1895.
- "The Dead Wall," The Yellow Book, Vol. VI, July 1895.
- "An Honorable Precedent," Short Stories: A Magazine of Select Fiction, Vol. XX, September/December 1895.
- "A Resurrection," The Yellow Book, Vol. VIII, January 1896.
- "Point Despair: A Memory of the Great Massacre." In Creek and Gully, T. Fisher Unwin, 1899.
- "The Alarm Bell," Outing, Vol. XXXIX, October 1901/March 1902.
- "The Attack on the Chaise," Lippincott's Monthly Magazine, Vol. LXX, July/December 1902.
- "The Knight Errant," The Windsor Magazine, Vol. XXI, December 1904/May 1905.
- "The Skirt of Chance." In Classic Tales by Famous Authors, The Bodleian Society, 1905.
- "Gallows Gate," Tom Watson's Magazine, Vol. I, March 1905.
- "The Lady with the Key," The Windsor Magazine, Vol. XXXII, June/November 1910.
- "Full Moon," The Windsor Magazine, Vol. XXXII, June/November 1910.
- "The Captain in Khaki," The Windsor Magazine, Vol. L, June/November 1919.
