= Robert Baldauf =

Robert Baldauf (April 22, 1881 in Waldenburg BL – May 26, 1918) studied Classical philology at the University of Basel (Switzerland) at the turn of the 19th and 20th centuries. He worked as a journalist of the Frankfurter Zeitung in Frankfurt from 1904 until his early death in 1918. In 1902 and 1903 he published two out of an intended four volumes under the general title of History and Criticism; the first and fourth volumes in the series. These two volumes are of interest to critics of chronology and written history. Baldauf managed to come to his conclusions by philological analysis.

== Work ==
Baldauf had studied the archives of the famous Swiss monastery of St. Gallen, formerly one of the key centres of Catholicism, and discovered traces of the library raid made by Poggio Bracciolini and a friend of his, both of them highly educated servants of the Roman curia. They purloined numerous manuscripts and books that were considered ancient from the library of this monastery (however, the manuscripts may date to a more recent epoch, which wouldn't preclude them from serving as prototypes for the manufacture of numerous "ancient" works by Poggio and his assistants).

Baldauf claimed to have studied numerous presumed ancient manuscripts and claimed they were, for the most part, recent forgeries. Baldauf discovered parallels between the historical books of the Old Testament and the works of the mediaeval Romance genre as well as Homer's Iliad that were strong enough to lead him to the assumption that the text of both the Iliad and the Bible date from the late Middle Ages.

Some of the mediaeval chronicles ascribed to different authors resembled each other to such an extent that Baldauf was forced to identify them as works of the same author, despite the fact that the two documents were presumed separated chronologically by an interval of two centuries at least. At any rate, some of the expressions characteristic for Romanic languages that one finds in both documents fail to correspond with either of the alleged datings (one of them being the ninth and the other the eleventh century). Apart from that, some of the manuscripts contain distinctly more recent passages, such as frivolous stories of endeavours in public steam baths (which the Europeans only became acquainted with during the late Reconquista epoch) and even allusions to the Holy Inquisition. Baldauf's study of the "ancient" poetry in Volume 4 demonstrates that many "ancient" poets wrote rhymed verse resembling that of the mediaeval troubadours. Baldauf is convinced that the verse of Horace is of mediaeval origin, pointing out German and Italian influences inherent in his Latin. Furthermore, Baldauf points out such pronounced parallels between the poetry of Horace and Ovid (who were presumably unaware of each other's existence) that one becomes convinced that the works of both belong to a third party – apparently, a much later author - a fact most philologists explain by the fact that Roman literature was heavily influenced by Greek models and especially Homer's writings and the motives used in the Ilias and the Odysee have marked all occidental literature until today.

Baldauf sums up his research in the following words: "Our Romans and Greeks have been Italian humanists." All of them – Homer, Sophocles, Aristotle and many other "ancient" authors, so different in our perception, hail from the same century, the fourteenth and fifteenth of the Italian renaissance. Baldauf avers that the entire history of the Ancient Greeks and Romans—likewise the Biblical "history," which correlates with the above to some extent—was conceived and introduced by the Italian humanists, as well as their colleagues and followers from other countries. Humanism, he says, has given us a whole fantasy world of antiquity and the Bible, as well as the early Middle Ages, which Baldauf also considered an invention of the humanist writers. This fictional history, initially drafted on parchment, was carved in stone and cast in metal; it "has rooted itself in our perception to such an extent that no positivist criticisms can make humanity doubt its veracity."

== Legacy ==
Some of his ideas have been readopted by other historians that doubt the historical chronology of the Antiquity and the Middle Ages, while all "mainstream" historians consider them valueless and argue that inventing 3000 years of history, its written accounts, literature, poetry etc. and destroying all the traces of this fraud was a work one generation of writers could never fulfill. The enormous expenditure of work this fraud would have needed makes these theories much more improbable than the coincidence in the literary works pointed out by Baldauf (according to the scientific principle of Occam's razor).

Contemporaries of Baldauf Edwin Johnson contributed to the same results. Yet they only aroused some limited interest and were soon forgotten or pushed aside. Therefore, nobody took care to investigate the life and circumstances of this enigmatic author. His being a lecturer at Basel University cannot be confirmed so far, as his name occurs nowhere in the annales and documents of this institution; the University printer only lists his name for two terms from winter 1901 to summer 1902 and tells us that he was born in Waldenburg (Switzerland) on 21. April 1881. It seems that he ever received his Ph.D., he died on 26 May 1918 in Frankfurt (Germany). Registration or address books in Basel city of the years around 1900 do not include his name. It is not until the early 1990s that he was restored out of oblivion by recent German history analysis (see books on chronology criticism by Uwe Topper).

== Works ==
- Robert Baldauf: Historie und Kritik Bd 4. Das Altertum C. Metrik und Prosa. Basel: Universitätsdruckerei Friedrich Reinhardt 1902. Facsimile reprint Dehli: Isha Books (= Gyan Books) Dehli 2013, ISBN 978-93-33-1637-3-6.
- Robert Baldauf: Historie und Kritik Bd 1. Der Mönch von St Gallen. Leipzig: Dyksche Buchhandlung 1903. Facsimile reprint Dehli: Isha Books (= Gyan Books) Dehli 2013, ISBN 978-93-33-1506-0-6.
- Robert Baldauf (rb): Das elsässische Problem auf der Bühne: Uraufführung von René Schickeles Schauspiel „Hans im Schnakenloch“ im Frankfurter Neuen Theater. In: Frankfurter Zeitung no. 351 (1916/12/19)
