= Topper (surname) =

Topper is an occupational surname, originally denoting "a person connected with spinning of flax or wool".

Notable persons and characters with this name include:

== People ==
- Burt Topper (1928–2007), American film director and screenwriter of teen cult films
- Curt Topper, American politician from Pennsylvania
- Hertha Töpper (1924–2020), Austrian operatic contralto and voice teacher
- Jesse Topper (born 1981), American politician
- Steve Topper (born 1961), Australian rugby player, brother of Stuart
- Stuart Topper (born 1971), Australian rugby player, brother of Steve
- Uwe Topper (born 1940), German non-fiction author

== Fictional characters ==
- Bud Topper, one of the main characters in the television series Noddy
- Cosmo Topper, the protagonist of Thorne Smith's novel "Topper" and all its adaptations.
- Mr. Topper, a bachelor, and character in Charles Dickens' novella "A Christmas Carol".
