= Toppe =

Toppe is a surname. Notable people with the surname include:

- Kjersti Toppe (born 1967), Norwegian politician
- Steffen Ingebriktsen Toppe (1902–1979), Norwegian politician
- Torgeir Toppe, Norwegian sprint canoer

== See also ==
- Topper (surname)
