= James Snowden =

James Snowden may refer to:

- James Ross Snowden (1809–1878), treasurer and director of the United States Mint
- J. Keighley Snowden (1860–1947), author
