= A. E. Johnson =

A. E. Johnson may refer to

- Amelia E. Johnson
- Alfred Johnson (author)
- Andy Johnson (politician)
