= Edwin Johnson (historian) =

English historian (1842-1901)

Edwin Johnson (1842 – 3 October 1901) was an English historian, best known for his radical criticisms of Christian historiography.

== Biography ==
Among his works are Antiqua Mater: A Study of Christian Origins (1887, published in London anonymously) and The Pauline Epistles: Re-studied and Explained (1894).

In Antiqua Mater Johnson examines a great variety of sources related to early Christianity "from outside scripture", coming to the conclusion that there was no reliable documentary evidence to prove the existence of Jesus Christ or the Apostles.

He asserts that Christianity had evolved from a Jewish diaspora movement, he provisionally called the Hagioi. They adhered to a liberal interpretation of the Torah with simpler rites and a more spiritualized outlook. Hagioi is a Greek word meaning "saints", "holy ones", "believers", "loyal followers", or "God's people", and was usually used in reference to members of the early Christian communities. It is a term that was frequently used by Paul in the New Testament, and in a few places in Acts of the Apostles in reference to Paul's activities.

Both Gnosticism as well as certain Bacchic pagan cults are also mentioned as likely precursors of Christianity.

In The Pauline Epistles and The Rise of English Culture Johnson made the radical claim that the whole of the so-called Dark Ages between 700 and 1400 A. D. had never occurred, but had been invented by Christian writers who created imaginary characters and events. The Church Fathers, the Gospels, St. Paul, the early Christian texts as well as Christianity in general are identified as mere literary creations and attributed to monks (chiefly Benedictines) who drew up the entire Christian mythos in the early 16th century. As one reviewer said, Johnson "undertakes to abolish all English history before the end of the fifteenth century." Johnson contends that before the "age of publication" and the "revival of letters" there are no reliable registers and logs, and there is a lack of records and documents with verifiable dates.

== Personal life ==
On 18 June 1867, at the Forest Hill Congregational Church, Sydenham, then in Kent, Johnson married Eleanor Mead.

Johnson died on 3 October 1901, while living in Hampstead, London. He left a widow, Eleanor, four daughters, and a son, Alfred Edwin, who was then a journalist.

== Publications ==
- The Mouth of Gold: A Series of Dramatic Sketches Illustrating the Life and Times of Chrysostom (1873)
- Antiqua Mater: A Study of Christian Origins (1887)
- The Rise of Christendom (1890)
- The Pauline Epistles: Re-studied and Explained (1894)
- The Quest of Mr. East (as "John Soane") (1900)
- The Rise of English Culture (1904)
- The Prolegomena of Jean Hardouin (translator, 1909)

== See also ==
- Robert Baldauf
- Jean Hardouin
- Forster Fitzgerald Arbuthnot
