= Women's Defence Relief Corps =

WWI British voluntary organisation

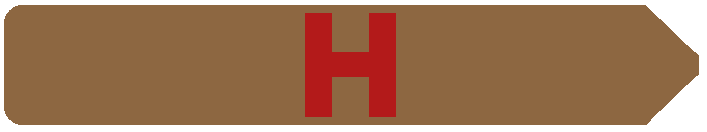
- Women's Defence Relief Corps brassard
- Active: 1914–1918
- Country: United Kingdom
- Role: Women's war work and home defence
- Engagements: First World War

The Women's Defence Relief Corps was a First World War voluntary organisation in the United Kingdom. It was set up to increase the number of women in employment which would release men to join the armed forces. It also had a "semi-military" section that trained women in marksmanship and military drill for home defence purposes. The corps was supported by the Board of Agriculture for a period, though it would be eclipsed by the more successful Women's Land Army.

== Foundation ==
The Women's Defence Relief Corps was founded by Mrs Dawson Scott in September 1914, shortly after the outbreak of the First World War. It was initially intended to increase the employment of women, which would release men to join the British armed forces (which did not introduce conscription until 1916). The organisation was supported by Herbert Kitchener, 1st Earl Kitchener (Secretary of State for War) and Frederick Roberts, 1st Earl Roberts (president of the Women's Rifle Associations). It expanded to two divisions: the civil section which focused on the original aim of women's employment and a "Semi-Military or good-citizen section". The latter division was a paramilitary of women who wanted to "defend not only herself, but also those dear to her". The semi-military section was set up after women were refused training by the official home defence units. The section drilled along military lines and trained women in marching, scouting and marksmanship. An official handbook for the corps was produced under the editorship of Mrs Scott; its 3rd edition was published in 1915. Women of the corps were issued a brown cloth brassard marked with a red letter H.

== War work ==
The corps mobilised to carry our agricultural work in spring 1915. It would go on to play a key role in putting farmers in touch with casual female labour. The corps advertised the available posts as suitable vacation work for women and stipulated a minimum wage of 18 shillings per week. The Women's Land Army developed from the corps in 1915, as a means of alleviating food shortages. By the war's end the land army would have sent out 9,022 female labourers and was instrumental in saving the 1918 British flax harvest.

The Women's Defence Relief Corps was a more modest organisation which by 1916 was sending out work teams totalling just 465 women. These focused on light agricultural work such as fruit picking, hop harvesting and hay making. Whilst the corps was viewed as unsuccessful in making a significant impact the Board of Agriculture took an interest, as it was keen to use it to increase the use of middle-class women in supervisory agricultural positions. By the end of 1916 the number of women in the corps had been increased to 2,000. The Board of Agriculture decided that a widespread reorganisation of female volunteer labour was needed and from March 1917 directed its efforts solely on the Women's Land Army.
