= Rosamund Marriott Watson =

English poet and writer (1860–1911)

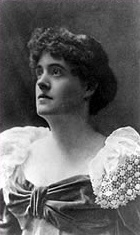
- Born: 6 October 1860; London, England
- Died: 29 December 1911 (aged 51)
- Occupations: Poet, writer, critic
- Spouse: H. B. Marriott Watson (1894–1911; her death)

Rosamund Marriott Watson (née Ball; 6 October 1860 – 29 December 1911) was an English poet, nature writer and critic, who early in her career wrote under the pseudonyms Graham R. Tomson and Rushworth (or R.) Armytage.

== Early life and education ==
Rosamund Ball, known as Rose, was born in London on 6 October 1860, the fifth child of Benjamin Williams Ball, an accountant and amateur poet, and Sylvia (Good) Ball. Her older brother Wilfrid Ball became a painter of landscapes and marine subjects who helped introduce her to London's literary circles, including John Lane, the influential publisher of The Yellow Book.

Her mother died of cancer when she was just 13, and she would later recall as one consequence of this that she had an unusual amount of freedom for reading and writing. No records of any formal education for her have been found. She initially intended to become a painter, but her father forbade it; her aesthetic sensibilities would later shape her writing about gardens and interior design.

== Career ==
Watson began her writing career in 1883, with a column on modern fashion for The Fortnightly Review. She followed this up with other magazine writing, and by 1886 she had her first poems printed in the American periodicals Scribner's Magazine and The Independent.

These early works were mostly published under one or other of the Armytage pseudonyms, which she adopted following her 1879 marriage to George Francis Armytage, a rich Australian. Their daughter Eulalie was born the following year, but by September 1884, when their second daughter, Daphne, was born, the couple had parted ways and would later divorce. Around 1886, she eloped with the artist Arthur Graham Tomson, shortly afterwards dropping the Armytage pseudonym in favor of "Graham R. Tomson". During her years with Tomson, they lived in London and often summered in Cornwall. She later divorced Tomson as well and lived with the novelist H. B. Marriott Watson until her death; they never married, although some of her obituaries referred to her as his wife. They had a son, Richard, who was killed in the First World War.

Watson's major success came from her poetry, which stood in the lineages of Alfred Lord Tennyson and Dante Gabriel Rossetti without, at its best, being derivative. Technically accomplished, Watson deployed a wide range of poetic forms and methods, including sonnets, ballads, rondeaux, villanelles, poems in dialect and translations. Her subject matter ranged from nature, the supernatural, legends and folk tales to love, loss, and art itself. Although the poems can be mannered, her clarity of insight and feminist rereadings of traditional stories have kept her work fresh, while her penchant for formal experimentation presaged modernism.

Watson's poems were published in various contemporary magazines and journals, including The Yellow Book. Her major volumes of poetry were Tares (1884), The Bird-Bride (1886), A Summer Night (1891), Vespertilia and Other Verses (1895), and After Sunset (1904). Tares, which was published as her first marriage was breaking up and focuses on the disillusionments of love, was issued anonymously. Watson used the Tomson pseudonym for The Bird-Bride and for the first edition of A Summer Night. In working under pseudonyms, Watson was part of a late 19th-century trend among women writers trying to break into male-dominated literary circles; among her contemporaries pursuing the same course were Mary N. Murfree ("Charles Egbert Craddock") and Mary Chavelita Dunne Bright ("George Egerton"). It appears to have helped her, since the influential editor Andrew Lang praised one of her early poems under the belief that it was by a man. Once Watson established herself in London's literary scene, later editions of A Summer Night carried her real name, as did her subsequent books, including the 1900 novel An Island Rose.

Watson wrote prolifically on gardening, and her essays on the subject (together with a few of her poems) were published in The Heart of a Garden (1906). She also wrote several columns on interior design and fashion—her first-ever publication, in 1883, was a column on 'modern' fashion for the Fortnightly Review. Some of these columns were collected in The Art of the House (1897). She wrote a column entitled "Wares of Autolycous" for the Pall Mall Gazette.

Starting in 1892, Watson edited the magazine Sylvia's Journal, which was a progressive, feminist-leaning women's monthly that covered a range of topics from work and art to the domestic sphere. Contributors under her tenure included Violet Hunt, Edith Nesbit, and others, and Watson herself wrote a book column, "Book Gossip".

In 1892, a long interview with Watson was published in Arnold Bennett's journal Woman.

Watson died of cancer on 29 December 1911 at the age of fifty-one. Her collected poems were published in 1912 with an introduction by H.B. Marriott Watson.

== Books ==
=== Verse ===
- Tares: a Book of Verses (1884; first edition carries no author name)
- The Bird-Bride: a Volume of Ballads and Sonnets (1889; as Tomson)
- A Summer Night and Other Poems (1891 as Tomson; 1895 as Watson)
- The patch work quilt (1892; as Tomson)
- Vespertilia and other verses (1895)
- Old Books, Fresh Flowers (1899)
- After Sunset (1904)
- The Poems of Rosamund Marriott Watson (1912)

=== Nonfiction ===
- The Art of the House (1897)
- The Heart of a Garden (1906)
- The Lamp and the Lute (1912)

=== Fiction ===
- An Island Rose (1900)
