= Margaret Henley =

Friend of J. M. Barrie

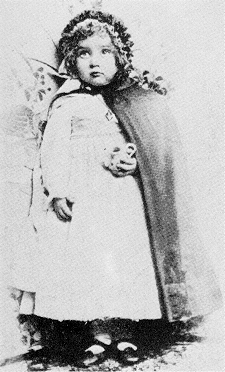
- Born: 4 September 1888
- Died: 11 February 1894 (aged 5)
- Parent(s): William Ernest Henley (father); Anna Henley (mother)

Margaret Emma Henley (4 September 1888 – 11 February 1894) was the daughter of William Ernest Henley and his wife Anna Henley (née Boyle). Margaret's friendship with J. M. Barrie, whom she called "fwendy" (i.e., "friendy"), was the inspiration for the character Wendy Darling in Barrie's play Peter Pan; or, The Boy Who Wouldn't Grow Up (1904) and its novelisation Peter and Wendy (1911). She may also have served as the inspiration for Margaret Dearth, the protagonist's "dream-child" in Barrie's 1917 play Dear Brutus, and for Margaret, Wendy Darling's granddaughter, in Peter Pan. Margaret died at the age of five of cerebral meningitis. She was buried at the country estate of her father's friend, Henry Cust, in Cockayne Hatley, Bedfordshire. She was an only child.
