= Wilfrid Ball =

British painter

- Born: 4 January 1853; London, England, United Kingdom
- Died: 14 February 1917 (aged 64); Khartoum, Sudan
- Known for: watercolor landscapes and marine subjects
- Spouse: Florence Helen Brock-Hollinshead

Wilfrid Williams Ball (4 January 1853–14 February 1917) was a British Victorian and Edwardian painter, watercolorist and engraver known for his watercolors of landscapes and local scenes.

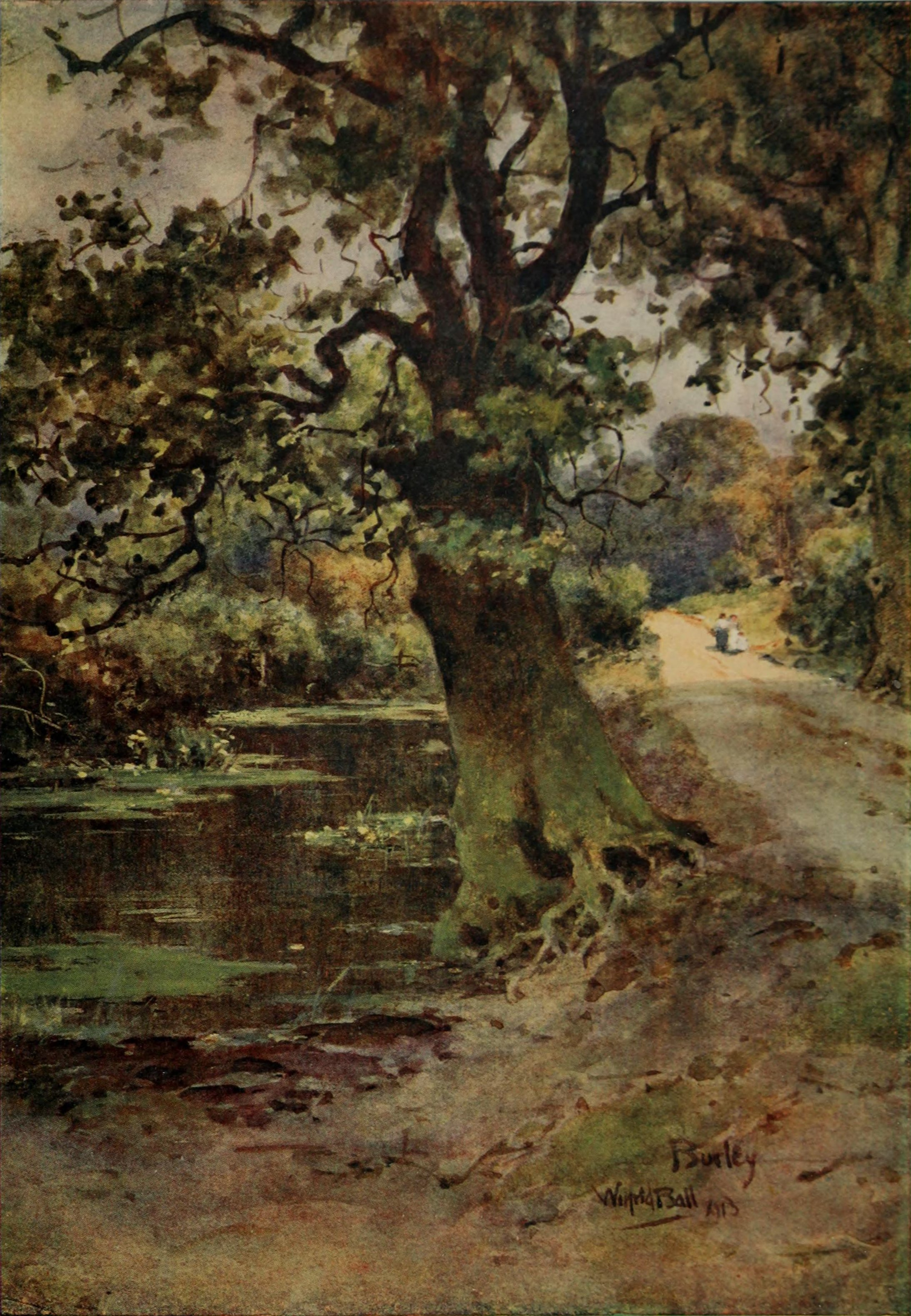
A Path in the New Forest, watercolor.

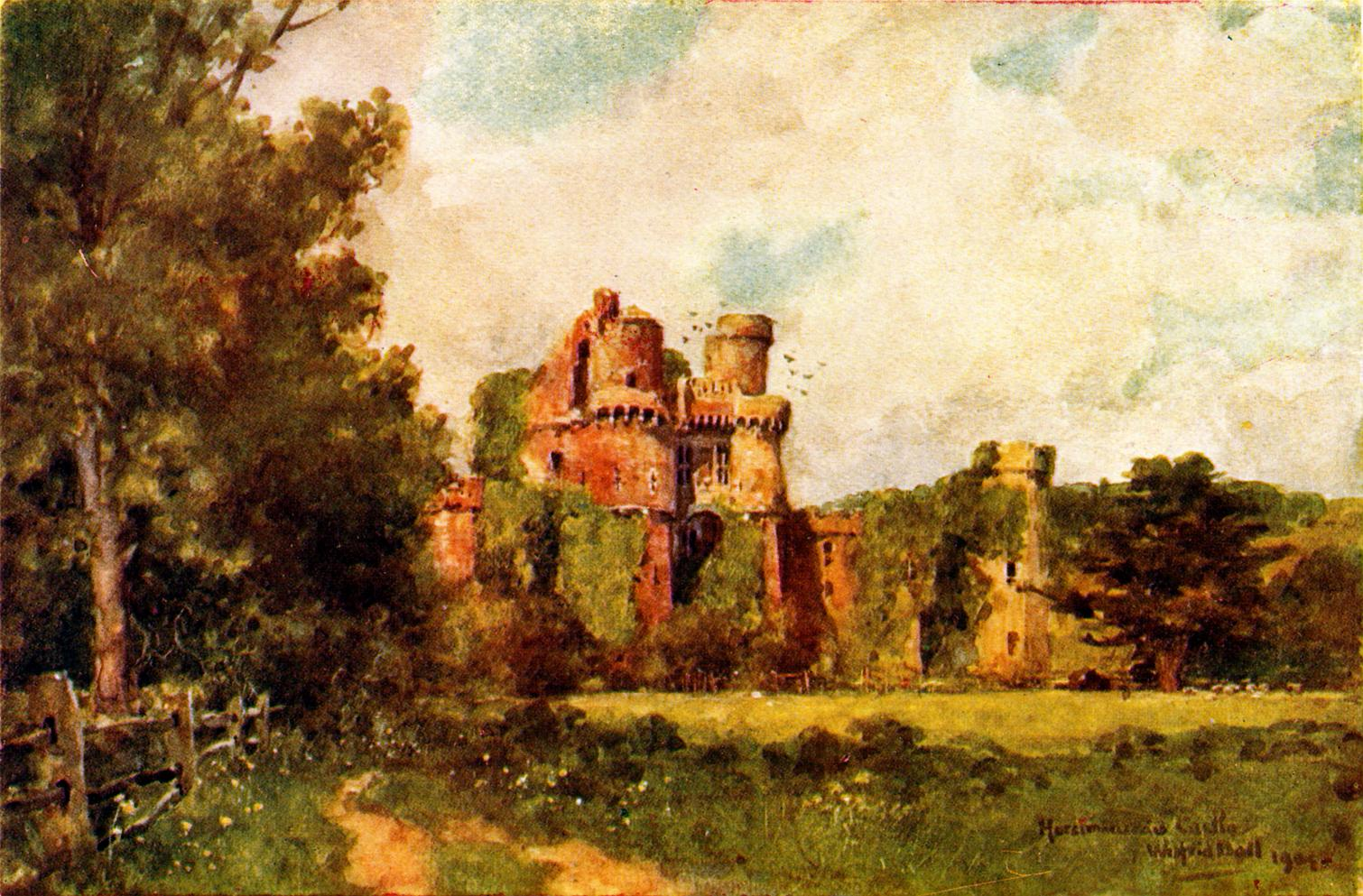
Herstmonceaux Castle, watercolor, 1906.

== Biography ==
Wilfrid Williams Ball was born in London on 4 January 1853, the fifth of six children of Benjamin Williams Ball, an accountant and amateur poet, and Sylvia (Good) Ball. He was athletic as well as artistically talented, and as a member of the London Athletic Club won prizes in several sports. His younger sister Rosamund became a noted Victorian poet.

Ball initially spent several years in an accountant's office as his father did not wish him to become an artist. In the evenings he studied drawing at Heatherley School of Fine Art in Chelsea, the only formal art training he ever received.

Ball began exhibiting in 1877 when a small etching was accepted for a Royal Academy exhibition, and with this impetus he decided to quit his job and become a full-time artist. He gained his first substantive notice when James Abbott McNeill Whistler admired a series of etchings of the Thames River that he did in 1881–82. He followed these up with two more etching series, one focused on the Isis River and the other on the town of Stratford-on-Avon. In 1900, one of his etchings was awarded a bronze medal at the Paris Exhibition.

Although Ball continued to make etchings, his major success came from watercolors of rural landscapes and marine subjects, especially in the counties of Buckinghamshire, Surrey, Norfolk, Sussex, Wiltshire, and Hampshire. He exhibited frequently at the Royal Academy; the Royal Society of Painters, Etchers and Engravers; the Royal Institute of Painters in Water Colours; and other venues. In 1887, he made his first trip abroad, painting the Venice lagoons; he later made sketching and painting trips to Holland, Germany, and Egypt as well.

He published two books of his work, Sussex: Painted by Wilfrid Ball (1906) and Hampshire: Painted by Wilfrid Ball (1909). These helped to popularize his work, which has ever since been used on postcards and greeting cards. Writing about him after his death, the art critic C. Lewis Hind observed of him that he had no revolutionary ideas and no particular ambition, but that his work was in demand throughout his career because it offered serenely pastoral and picturesque views of England that people wanted to hang on their walls.

Ball also wrote and illustrated several articles for the art magazine The Studio, one on Egypt and another on Venice.

In 1886, he served as President of the Society of British Artists.

In 1895, Ball married Florence Helen Brock-Hollinshead; they had no children.

Ball published two lavish books of his work in the A&C Black twenty shilling series; one of Hampshire in 1909 and an earlier one for Sussex in 1906.

During World War I, Ball served as an administrator for the British Army in northern Africa. He arrived in Cairo, Egypt, in September 1916 and initially worked with the firm of accountants that he had been associated with in his youth. He was sent on to Khartoum, Sudan, to audit military accounts and died there of heat apoplexy (heat stroke) on 14 February 1917.
