= Catherine Amy Dawson Scott =

English writer, playwright and poet (1865–1934)

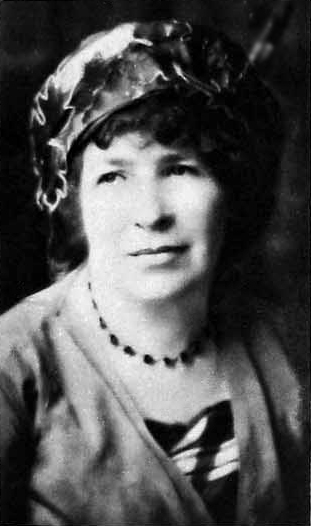
- Born: August 1865; Dulwich, England
- Died: 4 November 1934 (aged 69)
- Occupations: Writer, playwright, poet
- Spouse: Horatio Francis Ninian Scott
- Children: Marjorie, Horatio, Edward
- Relatives: Henry Dawson Lowry (cousin)
- Writing career
- Pen name: Mrs. Sappho; C. A. Dawson Scott
- Notable work: The Haunting
- Movements: Co-founder of English PEN

Catherine Amy Dawson Scott (August 1865 – 4 November 1934) was an English writer, playwright and poet. She is best known as a co-founder (in 1921) of English PEN, one of the world's first non-governmental organisations and among the first international bodies advocating for human rights, and the founding centre of PEN International, a worldwide association of writers. In her later years she became a keen spiritualist.

== Early life and education ==
She was born in 1865 in Dulwich to Ebenezer Dawson, a brick manufacturer, and his wife Catherine Armstrong. Her sister, Ellen M. Dawson, was born about 1868. Henry Dawson Lowry (Cornwall) was her cousin. Catherine Amy's mother died in January 1877, when she was 11 and her younger sister was seven years old.Their father remarried in 1878 and by 1881, the girls and their stepmother were living or staying with her widowed mother, Sarah Ancell, in Camberwell, where Catherine A. Dawson graduated from Anglo German College.

== Career ==
At 18, she began working as a secretary, while also writing. Her Charades For Home Acting (44 pp.) was published by Woodford Fawcett and Co. in 1888. Sappho, an epic poem 210 pages long, was published by Kegan Paul, Trench and Co. in 1889, at her own expense. She followed with Idylls of Womanhood, a collection of poetry published by William Heinemann in 1892.

At the age of 33, she married a medical doctor named Horatio Francis Ninian Scott. They lived in Hanover Square, London, where their first child, Marjorie Catharine Waiora Scott, was born in 1899; they also had a son, Horatio Christopher L. Scott, born in March 1901. Then the family moved to West Cowes on the Isle of Wight in the summer of 1902, where they lived for the next seven years. Another child, Edward Walter Lucas Scott, nicknamed Toby, was born in June 1904.

Catherine Dawson Scott, freed from daily household duties after the birth of the third child, found country life stifling and missed the literary culture of London. She resumed writing and in 1906, at age 41, published her first novel, The Story of Anna Beames under the pen name "Mrs. Sappho". Two years later she published her second novel, The Burden, under the name C.A. Dawson Scott.

She produced seven more books in six years until the outbreak of World War I in 1914, including in 1909 Treasure Trove (1909), The Agony Column (1909), and Madcap Jane (1910). In 1910, the Scott family moved back closer to London, enabling Dawson Scott to join London's literary circle. Dawson Scott continued to write and publish works, including Mrs Noakes, An Ordinary Woman (1911) and a guide (with map) titled Nooks And Corners of Cornwall (1911).

In 1912, Dawson Scott met poet Charlotte Mary Mew, who had reportedly read Madcap Jane. In the summer of 1913, Catherine Dawson Scott asked Charlotte Mew to her home in Southall to recite a few poems to a small group of acquaintances — but the self-conscious poet only consented a year later. Mew's reading on 16 March 1914 attracted the attention of the mystic poet Evelyn Underhill, who introduced Mew to the journalist and critic Rolfe Scott-James, then editor of the New Weekly. At that time, Dawson Scott was also engaged in, or had just finished, editing the poems of her deceased cousin, Henry Dawson Lowry, and writing her own poems.

At the start of World War I broke out, her husband entered the Royal Army Medical Corps and was sent to France while Dawson Scott, with the support of the British secretary of state for war Lord Horatio Herbert Kitchener, created the Women's Defence Relief Corps in late August 1914. The corps had two divisions: civil section, to substitute women for men in factories and other places of employment in order to free those men for military service; and a “semi-military” or “good citizen” section, for active recruitment of women for the armed forces, to be trained in drilling, marching and the use of arms so they could protect themselves and their loved ones on the home front in case of enemy invasion. In effect, thousands of women were sent to perform land work, exploited as casual, volunteer labour. When C. A. Dawson Scott and Dr. Scott returned from their military placements, they found it impossible to resume their relationship as before, after the traumatic (and alternately empowering, for Dawson Scott) experience of the war. Eventually, after 20 years of marriage, they divorced. Dr. Scott died by suicide in 1922.

In the spring of 1917, Dawson Scott founded the To-Morrow Club, which aimed to draw the "writers of tomorrow", i.e. the "literary youth", and connect them with established writers to exchange ideas, advice, and comments. Dawson Scott would sometimes invite the literary agents and editors she knew to attend Club dinners, while encouraging the young writers to meet them. The dinner meetings-cum-lectures soon became a weekly event. At the same time, Dawson Scott continued writing; she published the novel Wastralls in 1918, with which she resumed a prolific pattern of publishing a book nearly every year.

Catherine A. Dawson Scott remains best known for founding in 1921 the P.E.N. Club, a successor to the To-Morrow Club, and the founding centre of PEN International, a worldwide association of writers. The PEN Club dedicated itself to fostering a community of writers who would defend the role of literature in an ever-evolving society. John Galsworthy was asked to serve as PEN Club's first President and for most of the 1920s, Dawson Scott's daughter, Marjorie, served as its secretary. PEN was a shortened acronym for Poets, Playwrights, Editors, Essayists and Novelists, and though it was intended as apolitical, both its membership and leadership has been left-leaning.

In addition to her organising activities and original writing, Dawson adapted her 1921 novel The Haunting, in conjunction with some of her cousin Henry Dawson Lowry's writing, into the libretto for the opera Gale by Ethel Leginska. The opera premiered in Chicago at the Civic Opera House, with John Charles Thomas in the lead, on 23 November 1935.

== Psychical research ==
In Dawson Scott's book From Four Who Are Dead: Messages to C. A. Dawson Scott (1926), she writes that "certain small, unusual faculties had begun to develop" by her late 30s. She noted that, while resting after a meal, she realized she could amuse herself by closing her eyes, thus seeing a dark tunnel in her head, and then exploring that tunnel. After a woman she had known lost her husband, Dawson Scott asserted that she had psychic powers to communicate with the dead. She supported this notion by elevating the legacy of her grandfather's cousin, the spiritualist Edmund Dawson Rogers, who co-founded the British National Association of Spiritualists, founded and edited the spiritualist journal Light, and co-founded the Society for Psychical Research in the latter part of the 19th century.

In 1929, Dawson Scott founded The Survival League, a spiritualist organization which sought to unite all religions to study psychical research. H. Dennis Bradley was its first chairman. Dawson Scott wrote, "Many members of my family had [...] seen phantasms, and auras, had had prophetic dreams and so on." She went on to serve as the Organising Secretary for the successor to The Survival League, the International Institute for Psychical Research. The IIPR had been formed in 1934 "for the purpose of investigating psychic phenomena on strictly scientific lines." The group met for tea and to hold spiritualist seances and discuss possible methods of investigation, as well as individual cases.

== Works ==
- Charades for Home Acting. (1888)
- Sappho. A Poem (1889)
- Madcap Jane or Youth. T. Nelson & Sons (1890)
- Idylls of Womanhood. Poems. (1892)
- The Story of Anna Beames (1907)
- The Burden. (1908)
- Nooks & Corners of Cornwall. (1911)
- Alice Bland, and The Golden Ball. Two one act plays (1912)
- Tom, Cousin Mary, and Red Riding Hood. Three One Act Plays (1912)
- Beyond. Poems. (1912)
- Wastralls. W. Heinemann (1918)
- The Headland. Heinemann (1920)
- The Rolling Stone. A.A. Knopf (1920)
- The Haunting (1921). (New edition: Tabb House (March 1985), ISBN 0-907018-38-6)
- Bitter Herbs. Poems. A.A. Knopf (1923)
- The Turn of a Day. H. Holt (1925)
- The Vampire. A Book of Cornish and Other Stories. R. Holden & Co., Ltd (1925)
- Blown by the Wind (1926)
- From Four Who Are Dead: Messages to C. A. Dawson Scott (1926)
- (as editor with Ernest Rhys): Twenty-Seven Humorous Tales (1926)
- (with Ernest Rhys): 26 Adventure Stories, Old and New. (1929)
- (as editor with Ernest Rhys): Mainly Horses. Tales by Various Authors. (1929)
- The Seal Princess. George Philip & Son Ltd (1930)
- (as editor): The Guide to Psychic Knowledge (1932)
- The House In The Hollow Or Tender Love. Benn (1933)

Non-profit organization positions
Preceded by	International President of PEN International; 1921–1933	Succeeded by John Galsworthy
