= The Ludgate Monthly =

UK magazine

- Frequency: Monthly
- First issue: May 1891
- Final issue: February 1901
- Country: UK
- Language: English

The Ludgate Monthly was a London-based monthly magazine, which published short fiction and articles of general interest. There were 118 issues from May 1891 to February 1901; the magazine then merged with The Universal Magazine.

The magazine was published from May 1891 to October 1893 under the title The Ludgate Monthly for 30 issues, from November 1893 to October 1895 under the title The Ludgate Illustrated Magazine for 24 issues, from November 1895 to February 1901 under the title The Ludgate for 64 issues, and was then merged into The Universal Magazine. The Ludgate Weekly was a spinoff magazine which lasted less than a year (from 5 March to 1 October 1892); the first issue of this weekly had an Arthur Conan Doyle story The Great Brown-Pericord Motor.

Philip May was the editor of The Ludgate Monthly from its 1891 inception (selling for three pence per copy) to 1894. The first issue contained stories by Rudyard Kipling, John Augustus O'Shea, and Florence Marryat. The Ludgate is known for publishing the Red Mask by Rafael Sabatini and some of the earliest stories by C. Ranger Gull. James Nicol Dunn was the second editor, serving from 1895 to 1897.

== Editorship ==
Editor's name	Years
Philip May	1891–1894
James Nicol Dunn	1895–1897
Henry D. Lowry	1897–1898
Charles Hyatt-Woolf	1899–1901
