= Alfred Johnson (author) =

Alfred Edwin Johnson (16 June 1879 – 24 May 1939), was an English author, translator, and writer on art and dance under the name A. E. Johnson. He was also an artists' agent.

Born in Skirbeck, Boston, Lincolnshire, in 1879, the son of Edwin Johnson, an author, and his wife Eleanor Mead, by 1891 he was living in Hampstead, London, with his parents and four older sisters. In 1901, Johnson was a journalist, while three of his sisters were schoolteachers and one, Katherine, was a painter. His father died in 1901. As a young man, he enlisted in the Artists Rifles, a Volunteer Force unit of light infantry, and in 1903 edited the Volunteer Annual (Metropolitan Corps).

Johnson is best known as the author of A. & C. Black's "Brush, Pen and Pencil" series, early 20th-century monographs focusing on prominent British illustrators and caricaturists. He also wrote about dance, notably in his The Russian Ballet (1913), and translated literary works, such as Prosper Mérimée's novella Carmen. He spent his life in London.

In 1915, at St George's, Hanover Square, Johnson married Mary Katherine Hart. In the 1921 census, they were recorded as living at 4 Lower Terrace, Hampstead, and then had one daughter, Eleanor Margaret, aged four, one son, Thomas, aged seven months, and three living-in servants, a cook, a parlourmaid, and a nurse. Johnson stated his occupation as "artists' agent, employer" and his office address as 3, Henrietta Street, Covent Garden.

Mary Johnson died in March 1933. Johnson died in London on 24 May 1939 while living in New Square, Lincoln's Inn, and left an estate valued at more than £10,000, equivalent to £577,285 in 2025. He was buried with his wife at Putney.

== Selected works ==
- A. E. Johnson, John Hassall R.I. (London, A. & C. Black, 1907)
- A. E. Johnson, Dudley Hardy R.I., R.M.S. (London, A. & C. Black, 1909)
- A. E. Johnson, Lawson Wood (London, A. & C. Black, 1910)
- A. E. Johnson, Frank Reynolds, R.I. (London, A. & C. Black)
- A. E. Johnson, Tom Browne, R.I. (London, A. & C. Black)
- A. E. Johnson, W. Heath Robinson (London, A. & C. Black)
- A. E. Johnson, The Russian Ballet, illustrated by René Bull (London: Constable, 1913; New York: Houghton Mifflin, 1913)
- Charles Perrault, Old-Time Stories told by Master Charles Perrault (New York: Dodd, Mead, 1921, translator)
- Prosper Mérimée, Carmen (translator)
