= J. Keighley Snowden =

English author

James Keighley Snowden

James Keighley Snowden (23 June 1860 – 17 January 1947) was the author of about fourteen volumes of fiction from 1893 to 1937 in addition to several works of non-fiction. Writing also as Keighley Snowden, today his writings are largely forgotten.

Born as James Snowden in Preston, the son of Marianne née Haslam and William Snowden, a Draper Master, he was raised in the West Riding of Yorkshire and educated at the School of Science and Art in Keighley. Snowden began a long career in journalism with the Keighley News and spent 10 years with the Birmingham Daily Post before joining the staff of The Yorkshire Post in 1893 as assistant lead-writer. He had already sold several of his short stories set in Yorkshire to the Black and White and The Pall Mall Magazine. In 1893 he published his first collection of short stories, Tales of the Yorkshire Wolds, sketched from scenes of life in the North West Riding in which he depicted memories from his youth and tales collected from his father and grandfather, both Yorkshiremen. In this early work Snowden described himself as a Yorkshireman "no longer privileged to dwell amongst his kinfolk" and referred to the book as "a tribute of affection." From this book came the comic tale 'A Ghost Slayer', later included in the anthology Victorian Nightmares (1977) collected by Hugh Lamb. Much of the dialogue in his Yorkshire tales was written in local dialect.

His novel Barbara West (1901) is a tale of journalism set in the provinces of England during the 1880s, while Hate of Evil (1907) is a strange tale of a young clergyman who, to atone for an indiscretion during his youth opts for a life of poverty in a small and remote northern parish. Here his neighbour, the affluent Mrs Howard of Netherfell Hall, secretly adores him. He, meanwhile, seduces and subsequently betrays his charwoman while still keeping the love of Mrs Howard. His historical novel King Jack (1914) is set in the Yorkshire Dales during the early 19th-century and concerns a notorious outlaw and poacher.

A preface to The Weaver's Web (1932), itself a reprint of Snowden's The Web of an Old Weaver (1896) contains an introduction by his relative, the politician Philip Snowden who wrote of Snowden's "anxiety to see preserved the characteristics of a people which, I am afraid, are rapidly changing under the influence of modern transport and the uniformity of an education system imposed by a central authority."

In 1884 Snowden married Agnes Adamson Wallace Crawford. The couple had three sons and a daughter: the Fleet Street journalist Wallace Crawford Snowden; the musician and cellist John Keighley Snowden; the film producer Alec Crawford Snowden, while their daughter was the internationally acclaimed pianist, lecturer and expert on Elizabethan music Marion Keighley Snowden.

James Keighley Snowden died aged 86 in Willesden in Middlesex in 1947.

== Publications ==
- Tales of the Yorkshire Wolds London, Sampson Low, Marston & Co. (1893)
- The Web of an Old Weaver, London, Sampson Low, Marston & Co. (1896)
- The Plunder Pit, Methuen & Co. (1898)
- Barbara West, London : John Long (1901)
- Princess Joyce, London : Sir Isaac Pitman & Sons (1905)
- Hate of Evil, London : Hutchinson & Co. (1907)
- Kate Bannister, London : Eveleigh Nash (1907)
- The Life Class, London : T. Werner Laurie (1908)
- Verity Lads: being letters of Harry Verity to his Uncle Donty, London : T. Werner Laurie (1910)
- The Forbidden Theatre, London : T. Werner Laurie (1909)
- The Free Marriage, London : Stanley Paul & Co. (1911)
- Bright Shame, London : Stanley Paul & Co. (1912)
- King Jack, New York, E.P. Dutton (1914)
- Myth and Legend in the Bible, London : Watts (1915)
- The Master Spinner; a Life of Sir Swire Smith, LL.D., M.P., George Allen & Unwin, Ltd, London (1921)
- Jack the Outlaw, London: Simpkin, Marshall, Hamilton, Kent & Co. (1926)
- The Weaver's Web, London : Jonathan Cape (1932)
