= Percy Spence =

Australian artist

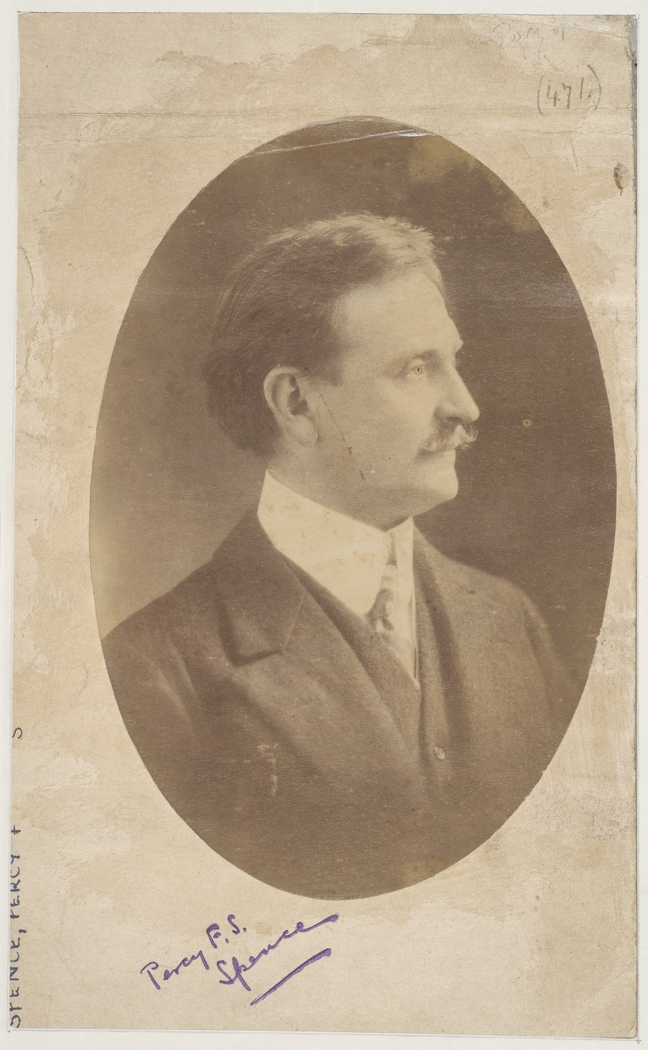
Percy Spence, c. 1910

Percy Frederick Seaton Spence (14 December 1868 – 3 August 1933) was an Australian artist.

Spence was born in Sydney, seventh child of English parents Francis Spence, civil servant, and his wife Hannah, née Turnbull. Spence spent his youth in Fiji where his father held a government position.

Spence became an illustrator to the Sydney Daily Telegraph, Illustrated Sydney News and The Bulletin and also exhibited at the Royal Art Society.

In 1893 Spence made two drawings of Robert Louis Stevenson in Sydney; one is now in the National Portrait Gallery, London. Spence went to England after marrying Jessie Wright 30 January 1894; illustrations by him appeared in Punch, Black and White, the Graphic, and other well-known publications of the time. Spence had two pictures in the Royal Academy exhibition of 1899 and his work was also accepted in the three following years. In 1901 he was responsible for the illustrations to Britain's Austral Empire, mostly portraits of the leading Australian politicians of that period.

In 1905 Spence was back in Sydney and held a one-man show of his work, and in 1910 he provided 75 illustrations for the volume Australia, in Black's colour series. They show Spence to have been an artist of ability and variety.

Spence died of uraemia on 3 August 1933 in Middlesex Hospital, London, after an eye operation. Spence is represented in the National Gallery and the Mitchell library in Sydney. A pencil sketch of Phil May is in the National Portrait Gallery (London), and other portraits are at University of Sydney and at the High Court. The "H. M. Australian Fleet arriving at Sydney Heads" and a portrait of Rear-Admiral George Patey are at Buckingham Palace.
