= Curt Topper =

American politician

Secretary of General Services of Pennsylvania
- In office May 11, 2015 – June 30, 2022
- Governor: Tom Wolf
- Preceded by: Sherri Phillips
- Succeeded by: Joseph Lee (acting)

Personal details
- Education: Brown University; Carnegie Mellon University

Curt Topper served as Pennsylvania Secretary of General Services from 2015 until 2022, having been nominated by Pennsylvania Governor Tom Wolf and confirmed in May 2015. Topper resigned from this position in June 2022. Previously, he served as Pennsylvania Deputy Secretary of General Services for Procurement from 2003 until 2008. Topper has a Bachelor of Arts in Political Science and Government from Brown University and a Master of Public Policy and Management from Carnegie Mellon University.
