= William Ernest Henley =

English poet, critic and editor (1849–1903)

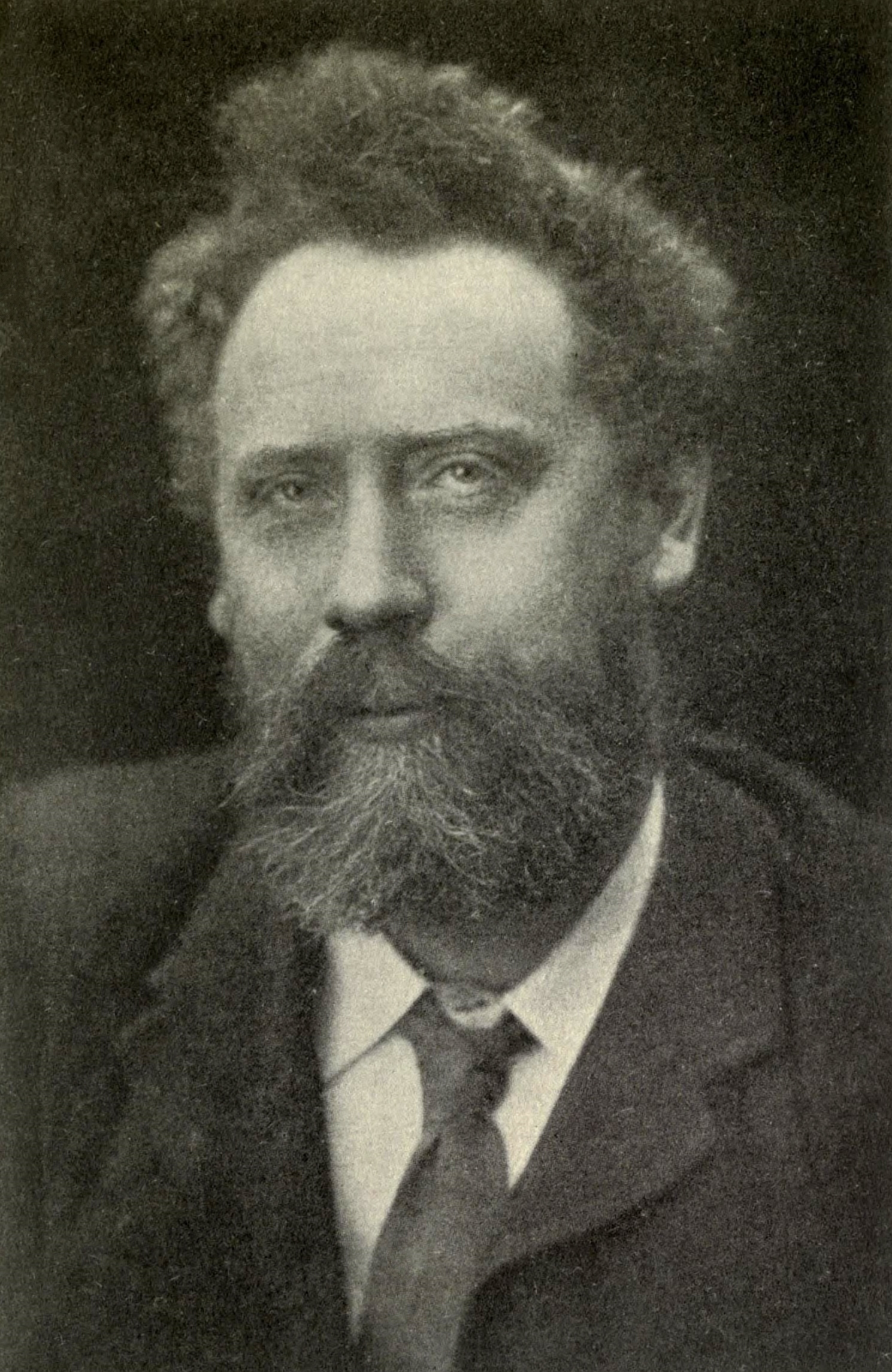
- Born: 23 August 1849; Gloucester, Gloucestershire
- Died: 11 July 1903 (aged 53); Woking, Surrey
- Education: The Crypt School, Gloucester.
- Occupations: Poet, critic, and editor
- Spouse: Hannah Johnson Boyle
- Children: Margaret Henley
- Writing career
- Period: c. 1870–1903
- Notable work: "Invictus"

William Ernest Henley (23 August 1849 – 11 July 1903) was an English poet, writer, critic, and editor. Though he wrote several books of poetry, Henley is remembered most often for his 1875 poem "Invictus". A fixture in London literary circles, the one-legged Henley was an inspiration for Robert Louis Stevenson's character Long John Silver (Treasure Island, 1883), while his young daughter Margaret Henley inspired J. M. Barrie's choice of the name Wendy for the heroine of his play Peter Pan (1904).

== Early life and education ==
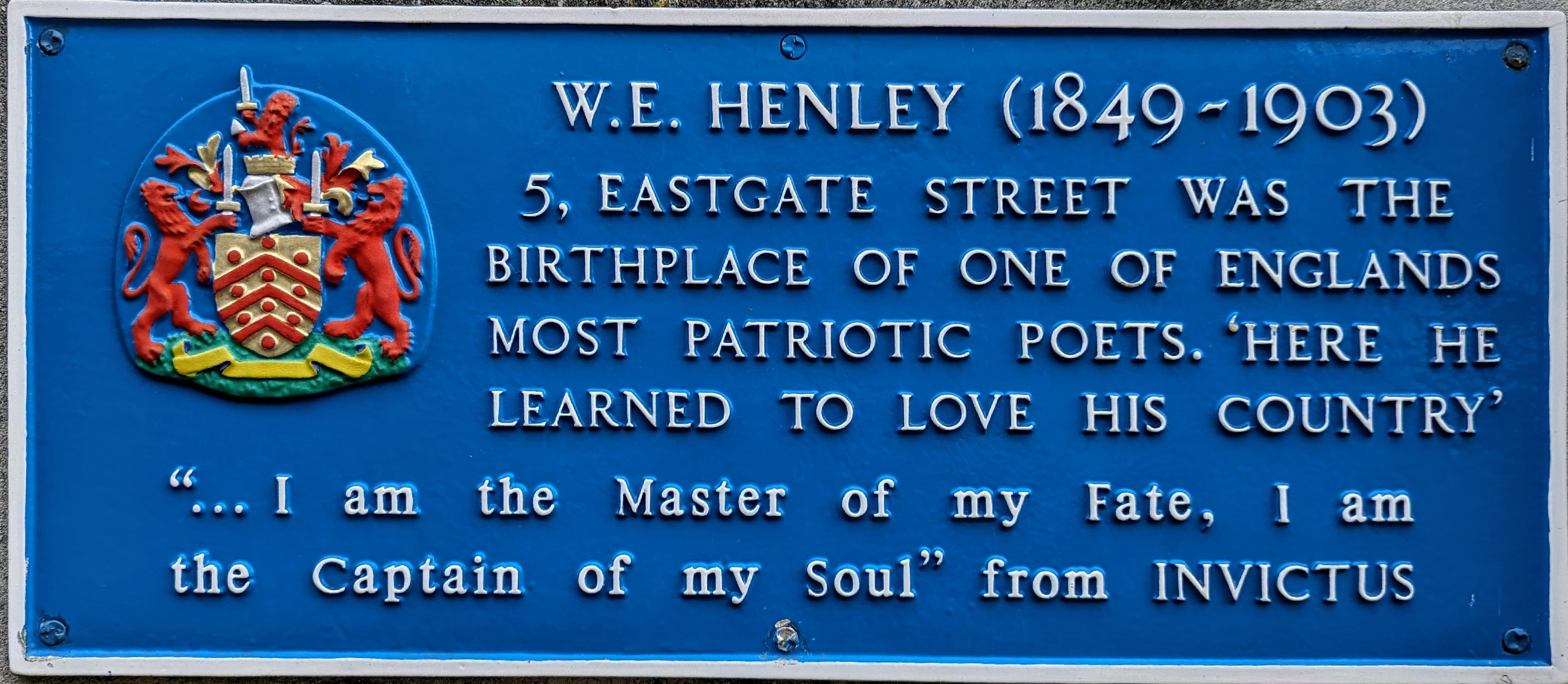
Plaque marking Henley's place of birth

Henley was born in Gloucester on 23 August 1849, to mother, Mary Morgan, a descendant of poet and critic Joseph Warton, and father, William, a bookseller and stationer. William Ernest was the oldest of six children, five sons and a daughter; his father died in 1868.

Henley was a pupil at the Crypt School, Gloucester, between 1861 and 1867. A commission had recently attempted to revive the school by securing as headmaster the brilliant and academically distinguished Thomas Edward Brown (1830–1897). Though Brown's tenure was relatively brief (c. 1857–1863), he was a "revelation" to Henley because the poet was "a man of genius—the first I'd ever seen". After carrying on a lifelong friendship with his former headmaster, Henley penned an admiring obituary for Brown in the New Review (December 1897): "He was singularly kind to me at a moment when I needed kindness even more than I needed encouragement". Nevertheless, Henley was disappointed in the school itself, considered an inferior sister to the Cathedral School, and wrote about its shortcomings in a 1900 article in The Pall Mall Magazine.

Much later, in 1893, Henley also received an LLD degree from the University of St Andrews, but two years after that, he failed to secure the position of professor of English literature at the University of Edinburgh.

== Health issues and Long John Silver ==
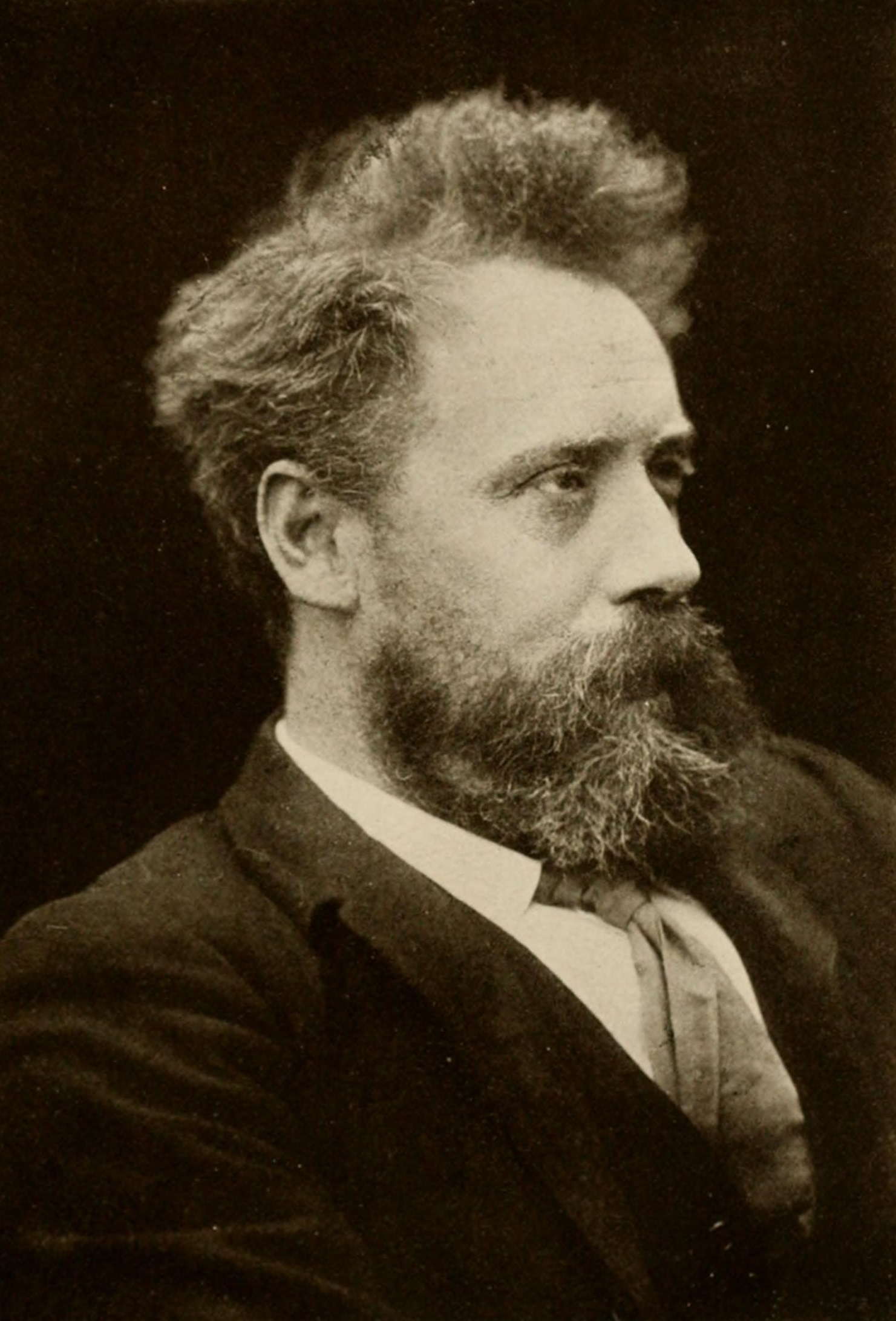
William Ernest Henley

From the age of 12, Henley had tuberculosis of the bone that resulted in the amputation of his left leg below the knee in 1868 or '69. The early years of Henley's life were punctuated by periods of extreme pain due to the draining of his tuberculosis abscesses. Henley's younger brother Joseph, though, recalled how after draining his joints, the young Henley would "Hop about the room, laughing loudly and playing with zest to pretend he was beyond the reach of pain". According to Robert Louis Stevenson's letters, the idea for the character of Long John Silver was inspired by Stevenson's real-life friend Henley. In a letter to Henley after the publication of Treasure Island (1883), Stevenson wrote, "I will now make a confession: It was the sight of your maimed strength and masterfulness that begot Long John Silver ... the idea of the maimed man, ruling and dreaded by the sound, was entirely taken from you." Stevenson's stepson, Lloyd Osbourne, described Henley as "... a great, glowing, massive-shouldered fellow with a big red beard and a crutch; jovial, astoundingly clever, and with a laugh that rolled like music; he had an unimaginable fire and vitality; he swept one off one's feet."

Frequent illness often kept Henley from school, although the misfortunes of his father's business may also have contributed. In 1867, Henley passed the Oxford Local Schools Examination. Soon after passing the examination, Henley moved to London and attempted to establish himself as a journalist. His work over the next eight years was interrupted by long stays in hospitals, because his right foot had also become diseased. Henley contested the diagnosis that a second amputation was the only means to save his life, seeking treatment from pioneering late 19th-century surgeon Joseph Lister at the Royal Infirmary of Edinburgh, commencing in August 1873. Henley spent three years in hospital (1873–75), during which he was visited by the authors Leslie Stephen and Robert Louis Stevenson and wrote and published the poems collected as In Hospital. This also marked the beginning of a 15-year friendship with Stevenson.

== Physical appearance ==
Throughout his life, the contrast between Henley's physical appearance and his mental and creative capacities struck acquaintances in completely opposite, but equally forceful ways. Recalling his old friend, Sidney Low commented, "... to me he was the startling image of Pan come to Earth and clothed—the great god Pan...with halting foot and flaming shaggy hair, and arms and shoulders huge and threatening, like those of some Faun or Satyr of the ancient woods, and the brow and eyes of the Olympians." After hearing of Henley's death on 13 July 1903, the author Wilfrid Scawen Blunt recorded his physical and ideological repugnance to the late poet and editor in his diary, "He has the bodily horror of the dwarf, with the dwarf's huge bust and head and shrunken nether limbs, and he has also the dwarf malignity of tongue and defiant attitude towards the world at large. Moreover, I am quite out of sympathy with Henley's deification of brute strength and courage, things I wholly despise."

== Personal life ==
Henley married Hannah (Anna) Johnson Boyle (1855–1925) on 22 January 1878. Born in Stirling, she was the youngest daughter of Edward Boyle, a mechanical engineer from Edinburgh, and his wife, Mary Ann née Mackie. In the 1891 Scotland Census, William and Anna are recorded as living with their two-year-old daughter, Margaret Emma Henley (b. 1888), in Edinburgh.

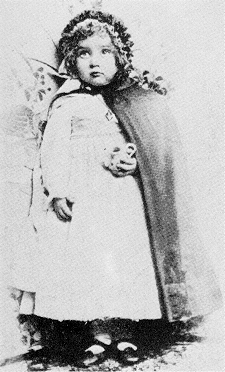
Margaret Henley

Margaret was a sickly child, and became immortalised by J. M. Barrie in his children's classic, Peter Pan. Unable to speak clearly, young Margaret had called her friend Barrie her "fwendy-wendy", resulting in the use of the name "Wendy" for a feminine character in the book. Margaret did not survive long enough to read the book; she died in 1894 at the age of five and was buried at the country estate of her father's friend, Harry Cockayne Cust, in Cockayne Hatley, Bedfordshire. In a letter of sympathy, the childless Stevenson wrote to Henley: ‘There is one thing I always envied you, and that I envy you still’.

After Robert Louis Stevenson received a letter from Henley labelled "Private and Confidential" and dated 9 March 1888, in which the latter accused Stevenson's new wife Fanny of plagiarising his cousin Katharine de Mattos' writing in the story "The Nixie", the two men ended their friendship, though a correspondence of sorts did resume later after mutual friends intervened.

== Hospital poems ==
As Andrzej Diniejko notes, Henley and the "Henley Regatta" (the name by which his followers were humorously referred) "promoted realism and opposed Decadence" through their own works, and, in Henley's case, "through the works... he published in the journals he edited." Henley published many poems in different collections including In Hospital (written between 1873 and 1875) and A Book of Verses, published in 1891. He is remembered most for his 1875 poem "Invictus", one of his "hospital poems" that were composed during his isolation as a consequence of early, life-threatening battles with tuberculosis; this set of works, one of several types and themes in which he engaged during his career, are said to have developed the artistic motif of the "poet as a patient" and to have anticipated modern poetry "not only in form, as experiments in free verse containing abrasive narrative shifts and internal monologue, but also in subject matter."

Forming the subject matter of the "hospital poems" were often Henley's observations of the plights of the patients in the hospital beds around him. Specifically, the poem "Suicide" depicts not only the deepest depths of the human emotions, but also the horrid conditions of the working class Victorian poor in Britain. As Henley observed firsthand, the stress of poverty and the vice of addiction pushed a man to the brink of human endurance. In part, the poem reads:

Lack of work and lack of victuals,
A debauch of smuggled whisky,
And his children in the workhouse
Made the world so black a riddle

That he plunged for a solution;
And, although his knife was edgeless,
He was sinking fast towards one,
When they came, and found, and saved him.

— "Suicide", stanzas 2-3

== Publishing career ==
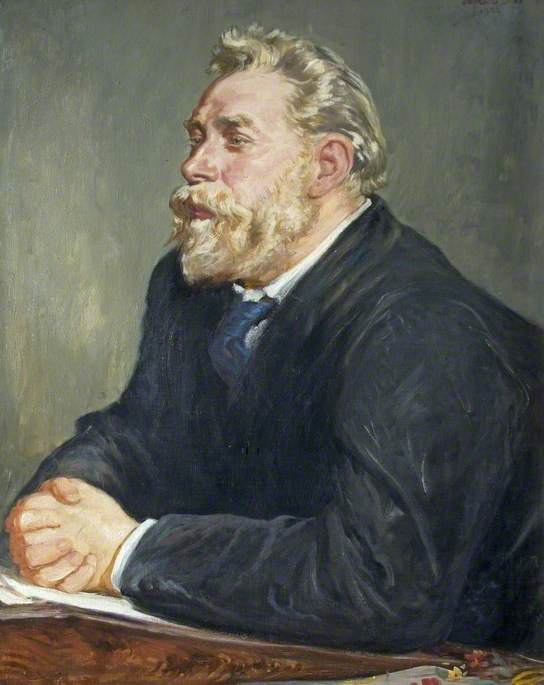
William Ernest Henley by Francis Dodd

After his recovery, Henley began by earning his living as a journalist and publisher. The sum total of Henley's professional and artistic efforts is said to have made him an influential voice in late Victorian Britain, perhaps with a role as central in his time as that of Samuel Johnson in the 18th century. As an editor of a series of literary magazines and journals, Henley was empowered to choose each issue's contributors, as well as to offer his own essays, criticism, and poetic works; like Johnson, he was said to have "exerted a considerable influence on the literary culture of his time."

For a short period in 1877 and 1878, Henley was hired to edit The London Magazine, "which was a society paper", and "a journal of a type more usual in Paris than London, written for the sake of its contributors rather than of the public." In addition to his inviting its articles and editing all content, Henley anonymously contributed dozens of poems to the journal, some of which were described by contemporaries as "brilliant" (later published in a compilation by Gleeson White). In his selection, White included a considerable number of pieces from London, and only after he had completed the selection did he discover that the verses were all by one hand, that of Henley. In the following year, H. B. Donkin, in his volume Voluntaries For an East London Hospital (1887), included Henley's unrhymed rhythms recording the poet's memories of the old Edinburgh Infirmary. Later, Alfred Nutt published these and others in his A Book of Verse. From 1882-1886, Henley worked as editor for the British transatlantic illustrated journal, The Magazine of Art, published in London and New York City.

In 1889, Henley became editor of the Scots Observer, an Edinburgh journal of the arts and current events. After its headquarters were transferred to London in 1891, it became the National Observer and remained under Henley's editorship until 1893. The paper had almost as many writers as readers, as Henley said, and its fame was confined mainly to the literary class, but it was a lively and influential contributor to the literary life of its era. Serving under Henley as his assistant editor, "right-hand man", and close friend was Charles Whibley. The journal's outlook "found utterance for the growing imperialism of its day", and among other services to literature it published Rudyard Kipling's Barrack-Room Ballads (1890–92).

From 1892–1903, Henley edited the Tudor Translations book series published by David Nutt.

== Death ==
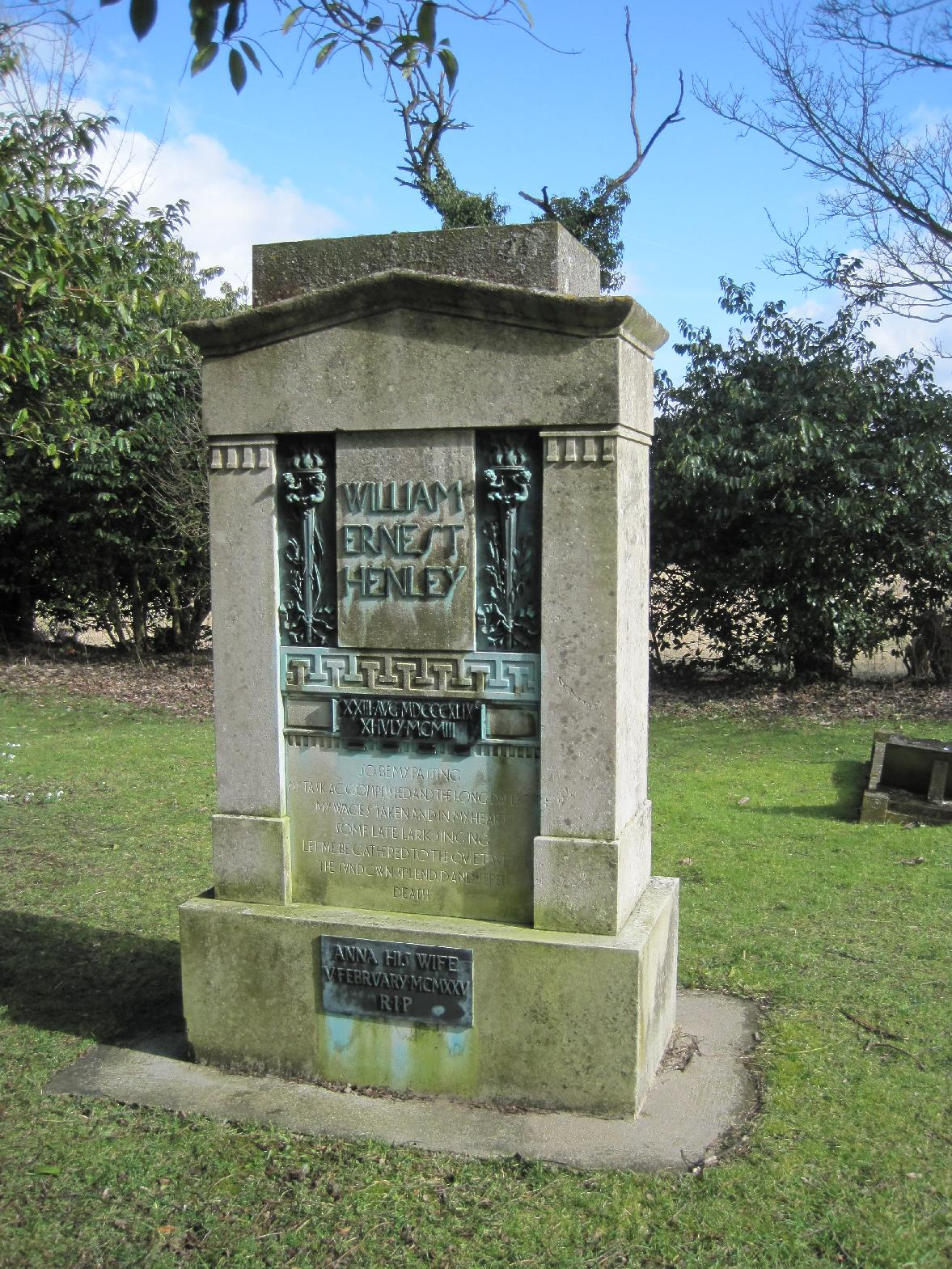
Henley's gravestone, Cockayne Hatley.

In 1902, Henley fell from a railway carriage, which caused his latent tuberculosis to flare up, and he died of it on 11 July 1903, at the age of 53, at his home in Woking, Surrey. After cremation at the local crematorium, his ashes were interred in his daughter's grave in the churchyard at Cockayne Hatley in Bedfordshire. At the time of his death, Henley's personal wealth was valued at £840. His widow, Anna, moved to 213 West Campbell-St, Glasgow, where she lived until her death.

=== Memorial ===
A bust of Henley is in the crypt of St Paul's Cathedral.

== Legacy ==
During his lifetime, Henley had become fairly well known as a poet. His poetry had even made its way to the United States, inspiring several different contributors from across the country to pen articles about him. In 1889, the Chicago Daily Tribune ran an article about the promise that Henley showed in the field of poetry. After Henley's death in 1903, an acquaintance in Boston wrote a piece about her impression of Henley, saying of him, "There was in him something more than the patient resignation of the religious sufferer, who had bowed himself to the uses of adversity. Deep in his nature lay an inner well of cheerfulness, and a spontaneous joy of living, that nothing could drain dry, though it dwindled sadly after the crowning affliction of his little daughter's death." Henley was known as a man of inner resolve and character that transferred into his works, but also made an impression on his peers and friends. The loss of his daughter was a deeply traumatising event in Henley's life, but did not truly dampen his outlook on life as a whole.

While it has been observed that Henley's poetry "almost fell into undeserved oblivion," the appearance of "Invictus" as a continuing popular reference and the renewed availability of his work, through online databases and archives have meant that Henley's significant influence on culture and literary perspectives in the late-Victorian period is not forgotten.

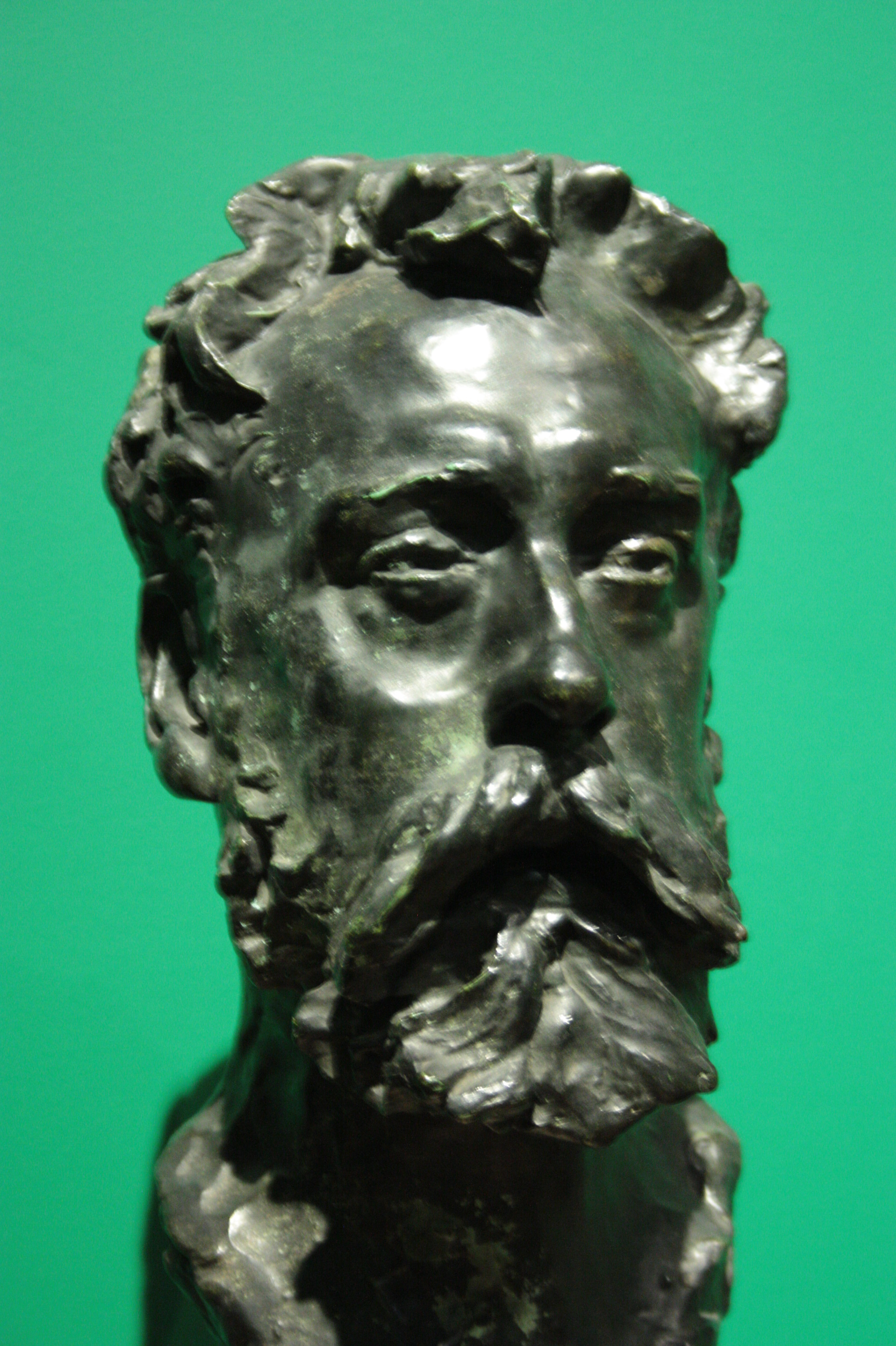
William Ernest Henley by Rodin

The Henley School was established in the 1960s in Jamaica Estates, New York City, as a private preparatory school named for poet Henley. It closed in 1972 due to financial difficulties. Notable attendees were philanthropist and police and transportation advocate David S. Mack and government and political leader Bruce Blakeman. Former professional basketball player William McKeever coached their varsity basketball team, considered a private school powerhouse in New York City.

Invictus Triangle on Henley Street in New York also honours Henley.

== In art and popular culture ==
George Butterworth set four of Henley's poems to music in his 1912 song cycle Love Blows as the Wind Blows. His poems' many other musical settings include songs by Maurice Blower, Harry Burleigh, Rebecca Clarke, Frederick Delius, Cecil Forsyth, Ivor Gurney, Fritz Hart, Roger Quilter, Ernest Walker, and Charles Willeby.

Henley's poem "Pro Rege Nostro" became popular during the First World War as a piece of patriotic verse, containing the following refrain:

What have I done for you, England, my England? What is there I would not do, England my own?

The same poem and its sentiments have since been parodied by those unhappy with the jingoism they feel it expresses or the propagandistic use to which it was put during WWI to inspire patriotism and sacrifice in the British public and young men heading off to war. The poem is referenced in the title, "England, My England", a short story by D. H. Lawrence, and also in England, Their England, a satiric novel by A. G. Macdonell about 1920s English society.

Nelson Mandela recited "Invictus" to other prisoners incarcerated alongside him at Robben Island, some believe because it expressed in its message of self-mastery Mandela's own Victorian ethic. This historical event was captured in fictional form in the Clint Eastwood film Invictus (2009), wherein the poem is referenced several times. In that fictionalised account, the poem becomes a central inspirational gift from actor Morgan Freeman's Mandela to Matt Damon's Springbok rugby team captain Francois Pienaar, on the eve of the underdog Springboks' victory in the post-apartheid 1995 Rugby World Cup held in South Africa.

In chapter two of her first volume of autobiography, I Know Why the Caged Bird Sings (1969), Maya Angelou writes in passing that she "enjoyed and respected" Henley's works among others such as Poe's and Kipling's, but had no "loyal passion" for them.

Joe Orton, English playwright of the 1960s, based the title and theme of his breakthrough play The Ruffian on the Stair, which was broadcast on BBC radio in 1964, on the opening lines of Henley's poem Madam Life's a Piece in Bloom (1877):

Madam Life's a piece in bloom
Death goes dogging everywhere:
She's the tenant of the room,
He's the ruffian on the stair.

— Echoes "IX: To W. R.", lines 1-4

Henley's 1887 Villon's Straight Tip to All Cross Coves (a free translation of François Villon's Tout aux tavernes et aux filles) was recited by Ricky Jay as part of his solo show, Ricky Jay and His 52 Assistants (1994). The poem was set to music and release with a video in July 2020 by folk band Stick in the Wheel.

== Works ==
=== Editions ===
- The London, 1877–78, "a society paper" Henley edited for this short period, and to which he contributed "a brilliant series of… poems", which were only later attributed publicly to him in a published compilation from Gleeson White (see below).
- In 1890, Henley published Views and Reviews, a volume of notable criticisms, which he described as "less a book than a mosaic of scraps and shreds recovered from the shot rubbish of some fourteen years of journalism". The criticisms, covering a wide range of authors (all English or French save Heinrich Heine and Leo Tolstoy), were remarkable for their insight.
- With John Stephen Farmer, Henley edited a seven volume dictionary of Slang and its Analogues (1890–1904).
- Henley did other notable work for various publishers: Lyra Heroica, 1891; A Book of English Prose (with Charles Whibley), 1894; the centenary Burns (with Thomas Finlayson Henderson) in 1896–97, in which Henley's Essay (published separately in 1898) roused considerable controversy. In 1892 he undertook for Alfred Nutt the general editorship of the Tudor Translations; and in 1897 began for the publisher William Heinemann an edition of Lord Byron, which did not proceed beyond one volume of his letters.

=== Poetry ===
- The poems of In Hospital are noteworthy as some of the earliest free verse written in the UK. Arguably Henley's best-remembered work is the poem "Invictus", written in 1875. Reportedly, this was written as a demonstration of his resilience following the amputation of his foot due to tubercular infection. Henley stated that the main theme of his poem was "The idea that one's decisions and iron will to overcome life's obstacles, defines one's fate".
- In Ballades and Rondeaus, Chants Royal, Sestinas, Villanelles, &c… (1888), compiled by Gleeson White, including 30 of Henley's works, a "selection of poems in old French forms." The poems were mostly produced by Henley while editing The London in 1877–78, but also included a few works unpublished or from other sources (Belgravia, The Magazine of Art); appearing were a dozen of his ballads, including "Of Dead Actors" and "Of the Nothingness of Things", his rondels "Four Variations" and "The Ways of Death", ten of his Sicilian octaves including "My Love to Me" and "If I were King", a triolet by the same name, three villanelles including "Where's the Use of Sighing", and a pair of burlesques.
- Editing Slang and its Analogues inspired Henley's two translations of ballades by François Villon into thieves' slang.
- In 1892, Henley published a second volume of poetry, named after the first poem, "The Song of the Sword", but later retitled London Voluntaries after another section in the second edition (1893). Robert Louis Stevenson wrote that he had not received the same thrill of poetry so intimate and so deep since George Meredith's "Joy of Earth" and "Love in the Valley": "I did not guess you were so great a magician. These are new tunes; this is an undertone of the true Apollo. These are not verse; they are poetry."
- In 1895, Henley's poem, "Macaire", was published in a volume with the other plays.
- Hawthorn and Lavender, with Other Verses (1901), a collection entirely of Henley's, with the title major work, and 16 additional poems, including a dedication to his wife (and epilogue, both penned in Worthing), the collection is composed of 4 sections; the first, the title piece "Hawthorn and Lavender" in 50 parts over 65 pages. The second section is of 13 short poems, called "London Types", including examples from "Bus-Driver" to "Beefeater" to "Barmaid". The third section contains "Three Prologues" associated with theatrical works that Henley supported, including "Beau Austin" (by Henley and Robert Louis Stevenson, that played at Haymarket Theatre in late 1890), "Richard Savage" (by J. M. Barrie and H. B. Marriott Watson that played at Criterion Theatre in spring 1891, and "Admiral Guinea" (by again by Henley and Stevenson, that played at Avenue Theatre in late 1897). The fourth and final section contains 5 pieces, mostly shorter, and mostly pieces "In Memoriam".
- "A Song of Speed" was his last published poem, released two months before his death.

=== Plays ===
- During 1892, Henley also published three plays written with Stevenson: Beau Austin, Deacon Brodie, about a corrupt Scottish deacon turned housebreaker, and Admiral Guinea. Deacon Brodie was produced in Edinburgh in 1884 and later in London. Herbert Beerbohm Tree produced Beau Austin at the Haymarket on 3 November 1890, and Macaire at His Majesty's on 2 May 1901.

== Notes ==
- James supplies a personal assessment of Henley's manner and influence (p. 271).
