= National Observer (UK) =

British newspaper

The National Observer was a British newspaper published from 1888 to 1897. It began as the Scots Observer and was renamed when it moved from Edinburgh to London in 1889. It was considered "conservative in its political outlook" and "liberal in its literary taste".

William Ernest Henley was the editor from 1889 to 1893, assisted by general manager James Nicol Dunn. Henley was recruited by Robert Fitzroy Bell, the major backer of the Observer, and brought in young writers including Rudyard Kipling. The political line was that of Charles Whibley, assistant editor, a diehard Tory. Bell became discouraged by 1894, and sold out. Henley was succeeded by James Edmund Vincent, with Percival Parr as editor.

Writers of fiction published in The National Observer include Thomas Hardy, George Bernard Shaw, H. G. Wells, J. M. Barrie, William Butler Yeats, and Rudyard Kipling.
