= Uwe Topper =

German amateur researcher and alternative historian

- Born: 1940 (age 85–86)
- Occupations: Researcher; writer
- Known for: Historical revisionism

Uwe Topper (born 1940) is a German amateur researcher and author of books about historic, ethnographic, and anthropological subjects.

In 1977, Topper published Das Erbe der Giganten (The Legacy of the Giants), a book about the prehistory of Spain and the Western Mediterranean basin. The main thesis interprets the remnant of very early high cultures there as the basis for Plato's Atlantis. Although this idea does not hold much credibility within mainstream research, his discovery of rock paintings and engravings presented in the book have been favourably received and quoted by academic researchers.

Since the late 1990s, Topper is best known as a proponent of alternative history, with his variant of New Chronology somewhat between Heribert Illig's phantom time hypothesis and Fomenko's version. Apart from working on New Chronology, Topper has done extensive anthropological research. His works in this field have been partially published in the yearbook of the German Institutum Canarium, as well as in the yearbook of the University of Cádiz, Spain. He has published scientific articles in German official reviews such as Zeitschrift für Ethnologie and Jahrbuch des Museums für Anthropologie München.

Topper has also written about the Book of Revelation (Das letzte Buch, 1993), about beliefs on reincarnation from a historical and ethnological perspective (Wiedergeburt, 1988), Sufism in North Africa (Sufis und Heilige im Maghreb, 1984/1991), and popular traditions in Morocco.

In 1995, Topper, who by then had got in contact with a group of German researchers including Gunnar Heinsohn, Heribert Illig, Christoph Marx, and others, who all question the established chronology, decided to take a closer look at the Middle Ages and published a series of books which try to show that history, as we know it, was created from the 16th century onwards—according to this idea, there are hardly well-dated facts before 1400 AD. Titles include Die Große Aktion [The Big Action] (1998), Erfundene Geschichte [Invented History] (1999), Fälschungen der Geschichte [Faked History] (2001), and ZeitFälschung [Faking Time] (2003).

Topper's focus on falsifications in the Middle Ages and modern times has raised interest in the German press.

== Books ==
- 1977: Das Erbe der Giganten. Untergang und Rückkehr der Atlanter (Walter Verl. Olten & Freiburg)
- 1986: Märchen der Berber (Diederichs, Köln)
- 1988: Wiedergeburt. Das Wissen der Völker (Rowohlt. Reinbek /Hamburg)
- 1988: Erdbefragung. Anleitung zur Geomantik (Knaur. Munich)
- 1988: Arte Rupestre en la Provincia de Cádiz (Cadix' Province Government, Spain)
- 1991: Sufis und Heilige im Maghreb. Marokkanische Mystik (Diederichs, Cologne)
- 1993: Das letzte Buch. Die Bedeutung der Offenbarung des Johannes (Hugendubel, Munich)
- 1993: Cuentos populares de los Bereberes (Miraguano Ed., Madrid)
- 1998: Die "Große Aktion". Europas erfundene Geschichte (Grabert, Tübingen)
- 1999: Erfundene Geschichte. Unsere Zeitrechnung ist falsch (Herbig, Munich)
- 2001: Fälschungen der Geschichte. Von Persephone bis Newtons Zeitrechnung (Herbig, Munich)
- 2003: horra. Die ersten Europäer (Grabert, Tübingen)
- 2003: Das Geheimnis des Elsaß. Was geschah damals am Odilienberg? (with Gert Meier and Hermann Zschweigert; Tübingen)
- 2003: Zeitfälschung. Es begann mit der Renaissance (Herbig, Munich)
- 2006: Kalender-Sprung. Falsche Geschichtsschreibung bestimmt die Zukunft (Tübingen)
- 2016: Das Jahrkreuz. Sprünge im Verlauf der Zeit (Tübingen)
