= Black & White (magazine) =

British illustrated weekly periodical

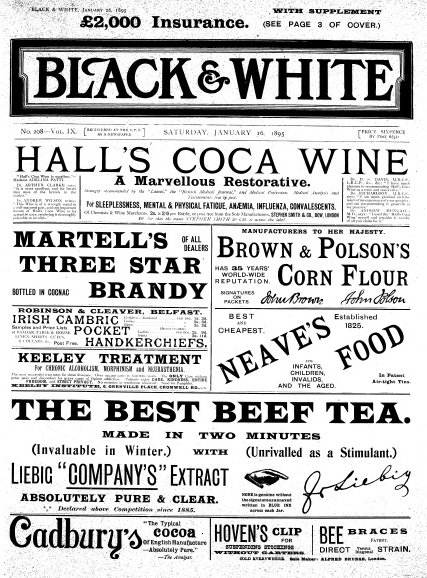
Front-page, 25 January 1895 of Black & White

Playbill for "illustrated lecture" on the South African campaign by René Bull, a war correspondent and artist for Black & White

Black & White: A Weekly Illustrated Record and Review was a British Victorian-era illustrated weekly periodical founded in 1891 by Charles Norris Williamson. In 1912, it was incorporated with The Sphere.

== History and contributors ==
Black & White magazine provided English readers with coverage of the Anglo-Boer War. It also published fiction by Henry James, Bram Stoker, H. G. Wells, Robert Barr, A. E. W. Mason, Jerome K. Jerome and E. Nesbit. Others who wrote for Black and White included Samuel Bensusan, J. Keighley Snowden, Philip Howard Colomb, Nora Hopper, Henry Dawson Lowry, Robert Wilson Lynd, Theodore Bent, and Barry Pain. In its first year, Black and White published "A Straggler of '15'", a short story by Arthur Conan Doyle, and began serializing "The South Seas", a series of letters by Robert Louis Stevenson. May Sinclair published her first short story, "A Study from Life", in the magazine in November 1895. The periodical carried art by Harry Furniss, Mortimer Menpes, and Richard Caton Woodville; and photography by Horace Nicholls.

=== Changes of name ===
Black & White had two different editions, the parent magazine, and a smaller, overlapping one named Black & White Budget. Confusingly, Black & White Budget went by a number of slightly different names.

- Black & White: A Weekly Illustrated Record and Review. London, [1889] - 13 January 1912 : vols. 1-45, issues no. 1-1093. (N.B.: Registration issues are available at the British Library for years 1889-1891 only.) In 1912, the magazine was discontinued as it was absorbed by The Sphere.
- Black & White Budget, a separate weekly with the following history:
  - Black & White: Transvaal Special No. 1. London, [14 October 1899].
  - Continued as: Black & White Budget: Transvaal Special. London, [21 October 1899] - 30 December 1899 : Nos. 2-12.
  - Continued as: Black & White Budget. London (inserted into Myra's Journal of Dress and Fashion ), 6 January 1900 - 30 May 1903 : Nos. 13-190.
  - Continued as: Black & White Illustrated Budget. London, 6 June 1903 - 17 June 1905 : Nos. 191-287; New Series nos. 1-10.
  - Continued as: Illustrated Budget. London, 24 June 1905 : New Series no. 11. The title was discontinued after one issue.

== Staff ==
Oswald Crawfurd was a director of Black and White upon its establishment. Eden Phillpotts worked as part-time assistant editor in the 1890s, and Arthur Mee worked as an editor in the late 1890s. The British Library has a complete run of Black and White. Black & White Budget was printed and published by W. J. P. Monckton in London.

== Gallery ==
Select Front Page Covers

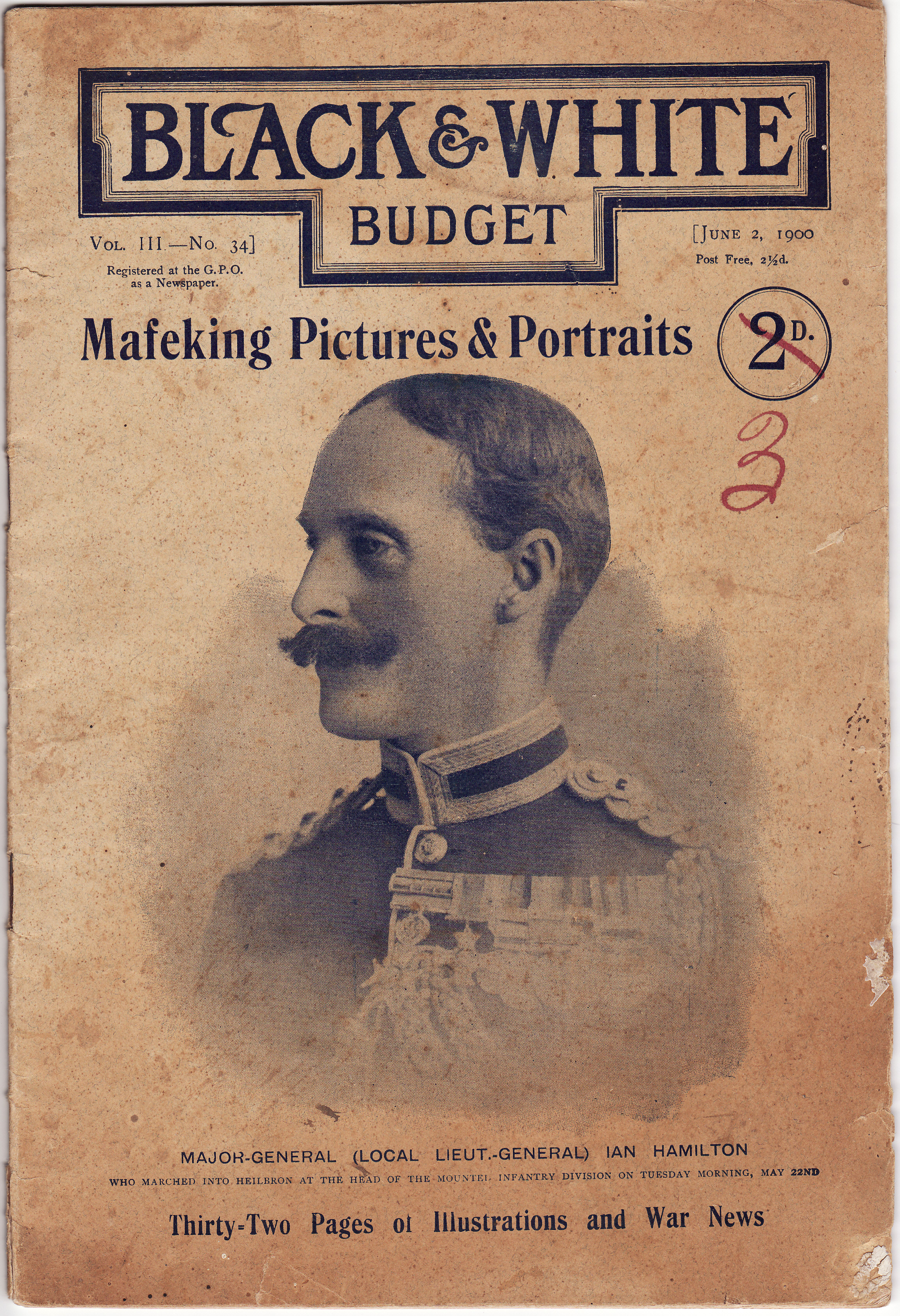
Original Budget cover

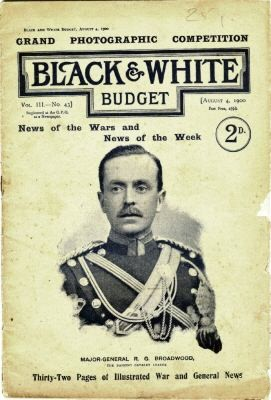
A cover

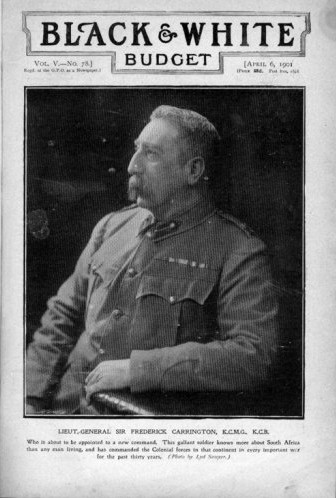
The Budget

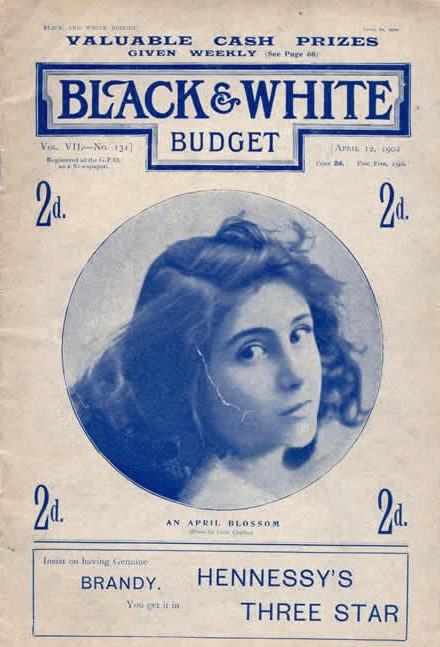
A Budget cover
