= Kronika Polska =

Kronika Polska (Polish for Polish Chronicle) may refer to:

- Chronica Polonorum (disambiguation)
- Kronika Polska (1597) by Marcin Bielski
- Prokosz Chronicle, a fake Polish chronicle forged by Przybysław Dyjamentowski
- Kronika Polska, Litewska, Żmudzka i wszystkiej Rusi (1582) by Maciej Stryjkowski

== See also ==
- Annales seu cronicae incliti Regni Poloniae (Roczniki, czyli kroniki słynnego Królestwa Polskiego), known as the Annals of Jan Długosz
- Chronicon Polono-Silesiacum
- Wielkopolska Chronicle
