= Albert of Stade =

Albert of Stade (c. 1187 – c. 1260) was a German monk, historian and poet.

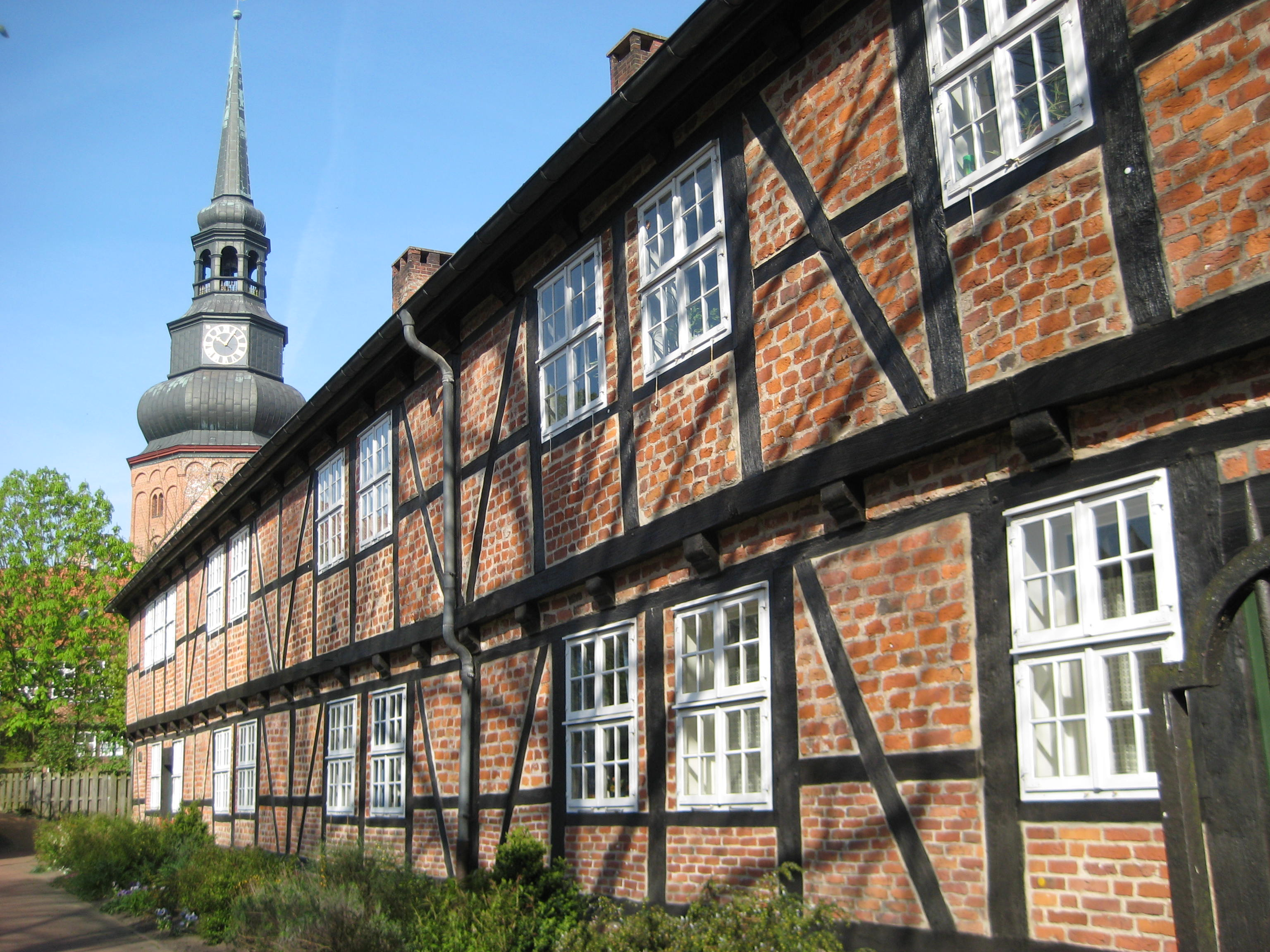
The building of secularised St John's Friary, Stade, housing a memorial plaque and a small exhibition on Albert of Stade

Albert probably studied in the school of Bremen Cathedral. He joined the Benedictine Order and entered the monastery of Harsefeld near Stade. He rose to become prior and in 1232 was elected abbot. He was opposed both to the lax enforcement of the Benedictine Rule at Harsefeld and to the introduction of the stricter Cistercian observance. For this reason he resigned as abbot in 1240 and joined the Franciscan friary of Saint John in Stade.

In the same year that he became a friar, Albert began writing a Latin world chronicle, the Annales Stadenses or Annals of Stade. It begins at Creation and ends in 1256. The early portions appear to have been based on Bede's Libellus de sex aetatibus mundi and Ekkehard's Chronicon. As he approaches his own time, Albert becomes, like most medieval chroniclers, both fuller and more reliable.

Albert also wrote several theological and literary works while he was a friar. He is credited with Raimundus, a versification of Raymond of Penyafort's Summa de casibus poenitentiae, and with Troilus, a Latin epic about the Trojan War in 5,320 lines.

Albert died between 1256 and 1258/1261, although he has sometimes been credited with the continuations added to his Annals to bring it down to 1265.
