= Gesta regum =

Gesta regum ("deeds of kings" in Latin) is a type of medieval work on the history of rulers, and may refer to:

- Gesta Regum Anglorum (early 12th century), history of kings of England, by William of Malmesbury (1095–1143)
- Gesta Regum Britanniae (1235–1254), Latin epic
- Gesta regum Sclavorum (c. 1300), history of rulers in Dalmatia
- Liber Historiae Francorum (also known as Gesta regum Francorum, 8th century), Frankish history

== See also ==
- Gesta
