= Chronica Polonorum (disambiguation) =

Chronica Polonorum or Cronica Polonorum (Latin for Chronicle of the Poles) may refer to:

- Gesta principum Polonorum (1112-1118), a medieval deeds narrative, by Gallus Anonymous
- Chronica seu originale regum et principum Poloniae (1190-1208), a Latin history of Poland by Wincenty Kadłubek
- Chronicle of Greater Poland (1377-1386), by Jan of Czarnków
- Chronica Polonorum (1519), by Maciej Miechowita
- Chronicon Polono-Silesiacum

== See also ==
- Kronika Polska (disambiguation) (Polish for Polish Chronicle)
