= Kronika Prokosza =

Chronicle of Prokosz
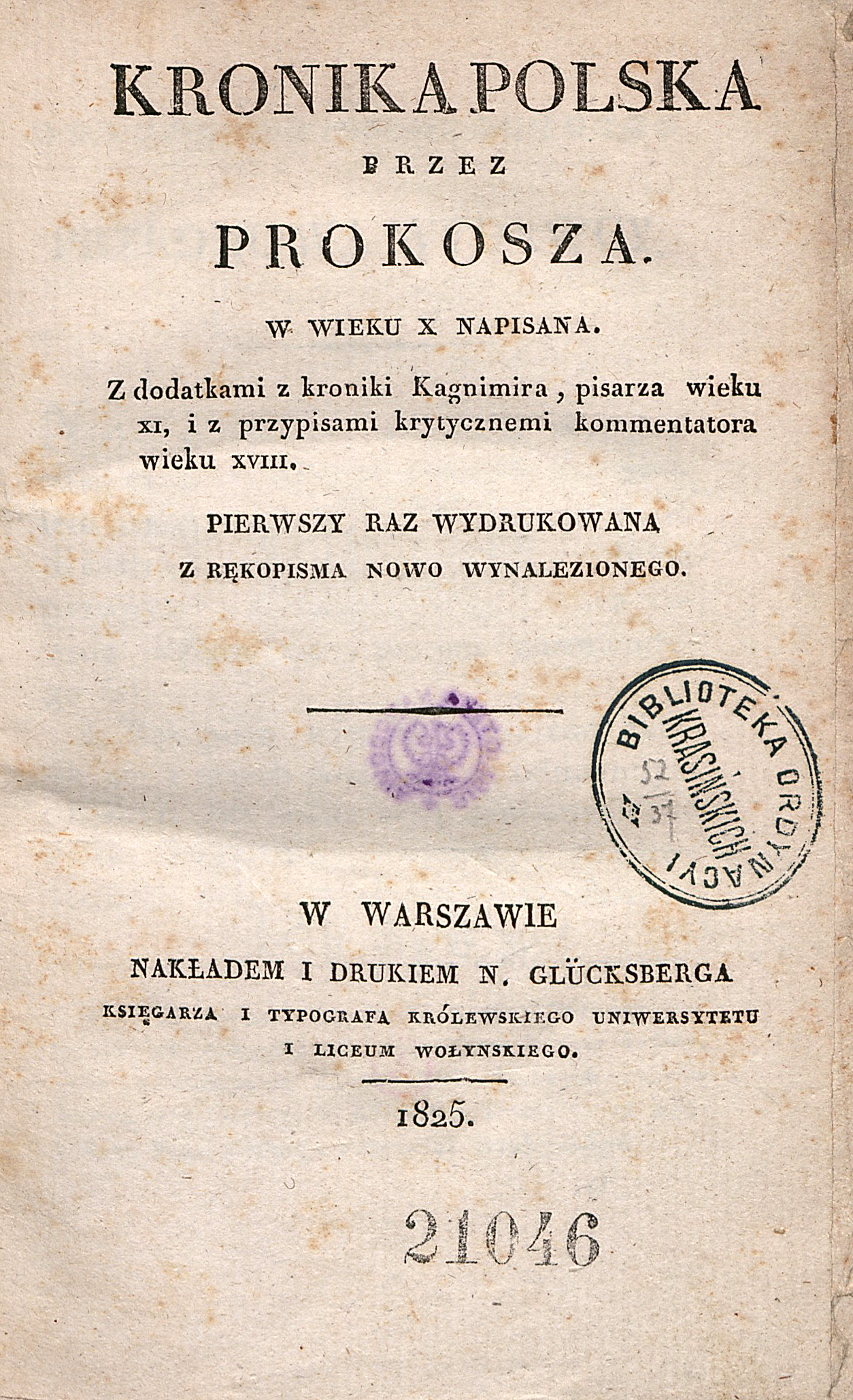
- Title page of the first edition from 1825
- Author: Unknown, likely Franciszek Morawski or Przybysław Dyamentowski
- Original title: Kronika polska przez Prokosza w wieku X napisana, z dodatkami z Kroniki Kagnimira, pisarza wieku XI, i z przypisami krytycznymi komentatora wieku XVIII pierwszy raz wydrukowana z rękopisma nowo wynalezionego
- Language: Polish
- Genre: Chronicle
- Publication date: 1825

Chronicle of Prokosz – first printed in 1825 by Hipolit Kownacki in Warsaw, is an alleged chronicle describing the earliest history of Poland, attributed to Prokosz, who was supposed to be an Archbishop of Kraków (or in other versions, a 10th-century Benedictine monk). Modern Polish scholarship has long rejected its authenticity and considers it a forgery. The so-called Chronicle of Prokosz was likely created in the early 19th century or at the earliest in the middle of the 18th century. Its author was most likely Gen. Franciszek Morawski or someone from his circle or Przybysław Dyamentowski; the identity of Dyamentowski himself also raises controversy. The Chronicle of Prokosz remains an object of interest among proponents of conspiracy theories regarding the existence of “Great Lechia”.

== History of discovery ==
The manuscript of the chronicle was presented to Julian Ursyn Niemcewicz by Franciszek Morawski, who allegedly purchased it at a Jewish market stall in Lublin. Niemcewicz, convinced of the authenticity of the work, presented it to the Warsaw Society of Friends of Learning. In the same year, the manuscript was published in print by Hipolit Kownacki, who also translated the text of the chronicle into Latin. The forgery of this chronicle was exposed within a year of its publication by Joachim Lelewel, who found its manuscript in Vilnius dated June 21, 1764, which pointed to Dyamentowski as its author, subsequently performing a critical analysis of its content. Przybysław Dyjamentowski was known as a forger of historical documents, engaging in the creation of false genealogies of magnate families and fictional sources describing the earliest history of Poland.

== Question of authorship ==
The preface to the first edition of the chronicle states that Prokosz (Prochorus) was supposedly the first Archbishop of Kraków, active during the time of Mieszko I, and died in 986. However, the existence of this figure has never been proven in any way. No reliable historical sources from that era mention Prokosz. Traditionally, the creation of the Chronicle of Prokosz is attributed to Przybysław Dyamentowski, an 18th-century document forger. This view was first formulated by Joachim Lelewel and was uncritically repeated for almost two centuries by successive generations of medievalists, including Janusz Tazbir, Andrzej Wierzbicki, and Henryk Samsonowicz. In light of research conducted in the early 21st century by historian Piotr Boroń, the identity and life of Dyamentowski himself raise some controversy. The man was said to be a cup-bearer (stolnik) of Urzędów, yet he does not appear in the registers of land officials of the Lublin Voivodeship. Thus, Dyamentowski may have used this title without grounds, or Joachim Lelewel received inaccurate information. Other intriguing issues are the unusual first names borne by Dyamentowski and his son (Przybysław and Sobiesław) for Poland at that time, as well as the information regarding the death of the alleged cup-bearer in 1774 at eighty years of age, leaving behind a minor son. On the other hand, Prof. Jerzy Strzelczyk considers Boroń's skepticism regarding Dyamentowski's very existence to be overly far-fetched, arguing that he is mentioned by Adam Boniecki, Jędrzej Załuski, and Stanisław Józef Duńczewski. According to Piotr Boroń, "a legitimate thesis seems to be that the so-called Chronicle of Prokosz is not an 18th-century forgery committed by Przybysław Dyamentowski, but a social joke fabricated shortly before 1825 by General Franciszek Morawski. Following the publication of the chronicle in print, this joke took on a life of its own, and the early history of Poland was enriched by yet another forgery."
