= William of Rennes =

13th-century French Roman Catholic friar

William of Rennes, OP was a French friar in the Dominican Order, was a poet, theologian and expert on canon law. William was a Breton born in Thorigné in the thirteenth century.

William wrote an "Apparatus ad summam Raymundi", a set of annotations to the Summa de casibus poenitentiae of Raymond of Peñafort. A summa is a summary of academic theology and canon law. In 1235 William argued that the baptism without the parental consent of Jewish children was suitable as Jews had a "servile status before Christians", he maintained that just as slaves have no parental rights due to their status, this fact also held true for the Jews, and as such the forced conversion of Jewish children was acceptable.

William wrote the Arthurian epic Gesta Regum Britanniae, in Latin hexameters, which he completed just after 1236. It is similar to the Historia Regum Britanniae by Geoffrey of Monmouth and was meant to rival the epic Alexandreis by Walter of Châtillon The Gesta Regum Britanniae is based on the legend of King Arthur, and in it he compares the conquests by Arthur to those of Alexander the Great, as an illustration of the mistakes caused by an unjust war. The poem is of interest to scholars of Arthurian literature, in that it was the first attempt to turn a medieval hero into a hero of the classical ages.

== Bibliography ==
- Avramescu, Cǎtǎlin (2009). An Intellectual History of Cannibalism. Princeton University Press. ISBN 978-0691133270.
- Brault, Gerard J. (1998). Early Blazon: Heraldic Terminology in the Twelfth and Thirteenth Centuries with Special Reference to Arthurian Heraldry (2nd ed.). Boydell Press. ISBN 978-0851157115.
- Echard, Siân (1998). Arthurian Narrative in the Latin Tradition. Cambridge University Press. ISBN 978-0521621267.
- Elliott, Dyan (2004). Proving Woman: Female Spirituality and Inquisitional Culture in the Later Middle Ages. Princeton University Press. ISBN 978-0691059563.
- Field, P. J. C. (1998). "Arthurian Literature VI". The Review of English Studies. 39 (153): 152–153. JSTOR 515522.
- French, Katherine (1999). "Pastors and the Care of Souls in Medieval England". The Medieval Review. 4. Indiana university Press. hdl:2022/4699. ISSN 1096-746X.
- Morris, Rosemary (1992). "The Gesta Regum Britannie of William of Rennes: An Arthurian Epic?". In Barber, Richard (ed.). Arthurian Literature VI. D.S.Brewer. pp. 60–123. ISBN 978-0859912266.
- Rider, Catherine (2011). "Medical Magic and the Church in Thirteenth-Century England". Social History of Medicine. 24 (1): 92–107. doi:10.1093/shm/hkq110. PMC 4326677. PMID 25684858.
- Szabó, Kinga Tibori (2011). Anticipatory Action in Self-Defence: Essence and Limits under International Law. Springer. ISBN 978-9067047951.
- Wright, Neil (1991). "Introduction". In Wright, Neil (ed.). Historia Regum Britannie of Geoffrey of Monmouth V: The Gesta Regum Britannie. D.S.Brewer. pp. IX–XV. ISBN 978-0859912143.
