= Chronica principum Poloniae =

Medieval chronicle from Poland

- Kronika książąt polskich (in Polish)
- Author(s): Peter of Byczyna(?)
- Patron: Louis I of Brzeg
- Language: Medieval Latin
- Date: between c. 1382 – c. 1386
- Provenance: unclear
- Genre: Historical narrative; chronicle
- Period covered: To 1382

Chronica principum Poloniae (Polish: Kronika książąt polskich) is a historiographical work written in Silesia, ca, 1382–1386. Its authorship is ascribed to Canon Peter of Byczyna (1328–1389).

The original chronicle (or the "first part") describes the history of the Piast dynasty and the Polish state from the earliest times to the mid 1380s. The work was later extended to cover the periods up to the 16th century.

== Book title ==
The work was written in the Latin as Chronica principum Poloniae, but is known also by its Polish-translated title Kronika książąt polskich, ("Chronicle of the Princes of Poland" or "Chronicle of Polish Dukes")

== Date and authorship ==
The work was commissioned by Louis I of Brzeg, along with his nephews Rupert of Legnica and Wenceslaus, Bishop of Wrocław, and tasked to Peter of Byczyna (Piotr z Byczyny|Piotr of Byczyna; German: Peter von Pitschen, 1328–1389), canon of the collegiate church (Polish: kolegiata) in Brzeg.

The writing was started the 1382 or thereafter and was completed by 1386. (Note: Since the work considers Jadwiga of Poland unmarried, its completion must have occurred between her arrival in Krakow in 1384 and her marriage to Jagiełło in 1386, thus Stenzel had argued completion in 1384 or 1385.)

It has been speculated that the author was quite likely to be of German stock; this according to Gustav A. H. Stenzel, who edited the 1835 printed text, and concurred by Zygmunt Węclewski in his preface to his edited text in 1878. This conjecture was partly based on textual evidence, but also on the observation that the author must have been a steadfast germanophile to present so favorable a picture of Queen Richeza, who was despised by the Poles.

== Continuation ==
The original work encompassed all the years up to 1384, but this was later expanded with a continuation which covers the history up to the year 1520. (Note: In Wojtkowiak's brief survey, the original Chronica principum Poloniae proper extends to 1398 (year of Louis's death), though the last decade of this period could not have been written by Peter (d. 1389).)

== Content ==
The chronicle is described as the "most important historiographic work of the Silesian Middle Ages". It delves into the origins of the Bohemian and Polish states, since the Post-Diluvian period. It records the history of the Piast dynasty and its branches from "time memorial" onwards to Louis's dukedom, into the 1380s or 1390s. The work by design closely intertwined the history of Silesia with the history of other Polish provinces. It may have had the intention of bolstering the position of Louis's claim to the Polish throne.

== Sources ==
Like Wincenty's Chronica (Note: Wincenty Kadłubek, aka Magister Wincenty, "Master Vincent", St. Wincenty, etc.) compiled earlier, it used Gallus Anonymus's Gesta as its source.

However, perhaps a more extensive source was the Chronicon Polono-Silesiacum ("Polish-Silesian Chronicle"), completed c. 1285. A copy of it had been purchased by the works patron Louis, and it served as source to the period from the beginning in to the year 1277.

Gallus was utilized as a source for a shorter span of history, from the Polish kingship being taken over from Pompilius (Popiel) by the Piasts (10th century?), (Note: Some time after "ca. 800", as printed on the margins of p. 44.) until and not including the Siege of Głogów (1109), where Emperor Henry IV (Henry V of Germany)'s invasion of Poland, provoked by Bolesław III Wrymouth. (Note: The part about this German conflict is thus ascribed to the Chronica Polonorum (i.e., the 'Silesian' Chronica Polonorum or Chronicon Polono-Silesiacum, cf. Wojtkowiak and infra. It includes the mention that the Poles began referring to the Germans as dogs, so that the Emperor's camp was dubbed Polish: psipole (Dog's camp)" in Polish, which was Hundisfelt [sic.] in the Teutonic language. The familiarity with the German phrase "Hundisfelt" here has been cited for evidence of Peter's ethnicity. Stenzel is also certain that the author of the Silesian Chronica Polonorum was "unarguably German".)

One commentator more broadly stated that the first part, up to year 1285, was derived from these two earlier sources ("Silesian-Polish Chronicle" [sic.] and Gallus) while the second part from 1285 onwards, can be credited as Peter's original composition.
