= Gesta =

Gesta (Latin for "deeds") is the name used for many medieval works. It may refer to:

== Titles of works ==
Gesta is the Latin word for "deeds" or "acts", and Latin titles, especially of medieval chronicles, frequently begin with the word, which thus is also a generic term for medieval biographies:

- Gesta Adalberonis or Gesta Alberonis, "Deeds of Albero", Archbishop of Trier (1131–52)
- Gesta Berengarii imperatoris, "Deeds of the Emperor Berengar", epic poem chronicling the career of Berengar of Friuli from c. 874 to 915
- Gesta comitum Barcinonensium et regum Aragoniae, "Deeds of the counts of Barcelona and kings of Aragon", 14th century
- Gesta Cnutonis Regis or Encomium Emmae Reginae, "Deeds of King Canute" 11th-century, also covers Queen Emma of Normandy
- Gesta Danorum, "Deeds of the Danes", 12th century
- Dei gesta per Francos, "Deeds of God through the Franks", 12th century, a narrative of the First Crusade
- Gesta Francorum, "The Deeds of the Franks", in full Gesta Francorum et aliorum Hierosolimitanorum ("The deeds of the Franks and the other pilgrims to Jerusalem"), 12th century, a different narrative of the First Crusade
- Gesta Guillelmi or Gesta Willelmi ducis Normannorum et regis Anglorum, "Deeds of William Duke of Normandy and King of England" (William the Conqueror), 11th century
- Gesta Hammaburgensis ecclesiae pontificum, "Deeds of Bishops of the Hamburg Church", 11th century
- Gesta Herewardi, "Deeds of Hereward the Wake", 12th century
- Gesta Hungarorum, "Deeds of the Hungarians", 12th century
- Gesta Hunnorum et Hungarorum, "Deeds of the Huns and Hungarians", 13th century
- Gesta Hludowici Imperatoris, "Deeds of Emperor Louis", 9th century life of the Holy Roman Emperor Louis the Pious.
- Gesta Normannorum Ducum, "Deeds of the Dukes of Normandy", 11th century, extended in 12th.
- Gesta principum Polonorum, "Deeds of the Princes of the Poles", 12th century
- Gesta pontificum Anglorum, "Deeds of the English Bishops", 12th century
- Gesta Romanorum, "Deeds of the Romans", a collection of anecdotes and tales, c. 1300, created somewhere in northern Europe
- Gesta Regum Anglorum, "Deeds of the kings of the English", c. 1125
- Gesta Regum Britanniae, "Deeds of the Kings of Britain", poem c. 1240s
- Gesta regum Francorum, "Deeds of the Kings of the French", c. 727, more often called the Liber Historiae Francorum
- Gesta Roberti Wiscardi, "The Deeds of Robert Guiscard", 1090s, poem
- Gesta Roderici Campi Docti, "Deeds of Rodrigo el Campeador" (El Cid), 12th century
- Gesta Rogeri (Deeds of Roger), covers the reign of Roger II of Sicily 1127–1135, written by Alexander of Telese
- Gesta Stephani, "Deeds of King Stephen" of England, mid-12th-century
- Gesta Tancredi in expeditione Hierosolymitana, "The Deeds of Tancred in the Expedition to Jerusalem" (First Crusade), early 12th century
- Gesta Treverorum, "Deeds of the people of Trier", a collection of histories, legends, wars, & records of the Archbishops of Trier, compiled 12th century to 1794

== Other ==
- Gesta (butterfly), a genus of skipper butterfly
- Gesta (journal), an academic journal on medieval history published by The University of Chicago Press on behalf of the International Center of Medieval Art
- Cantar de gesta and chanson de geste, both meaning "song of deeds", is a term for medieval Spanish and French poems on heroic themes
