= Song of the Killing of Andrzej Tęczyński =

Anonymous medieval occasional verse

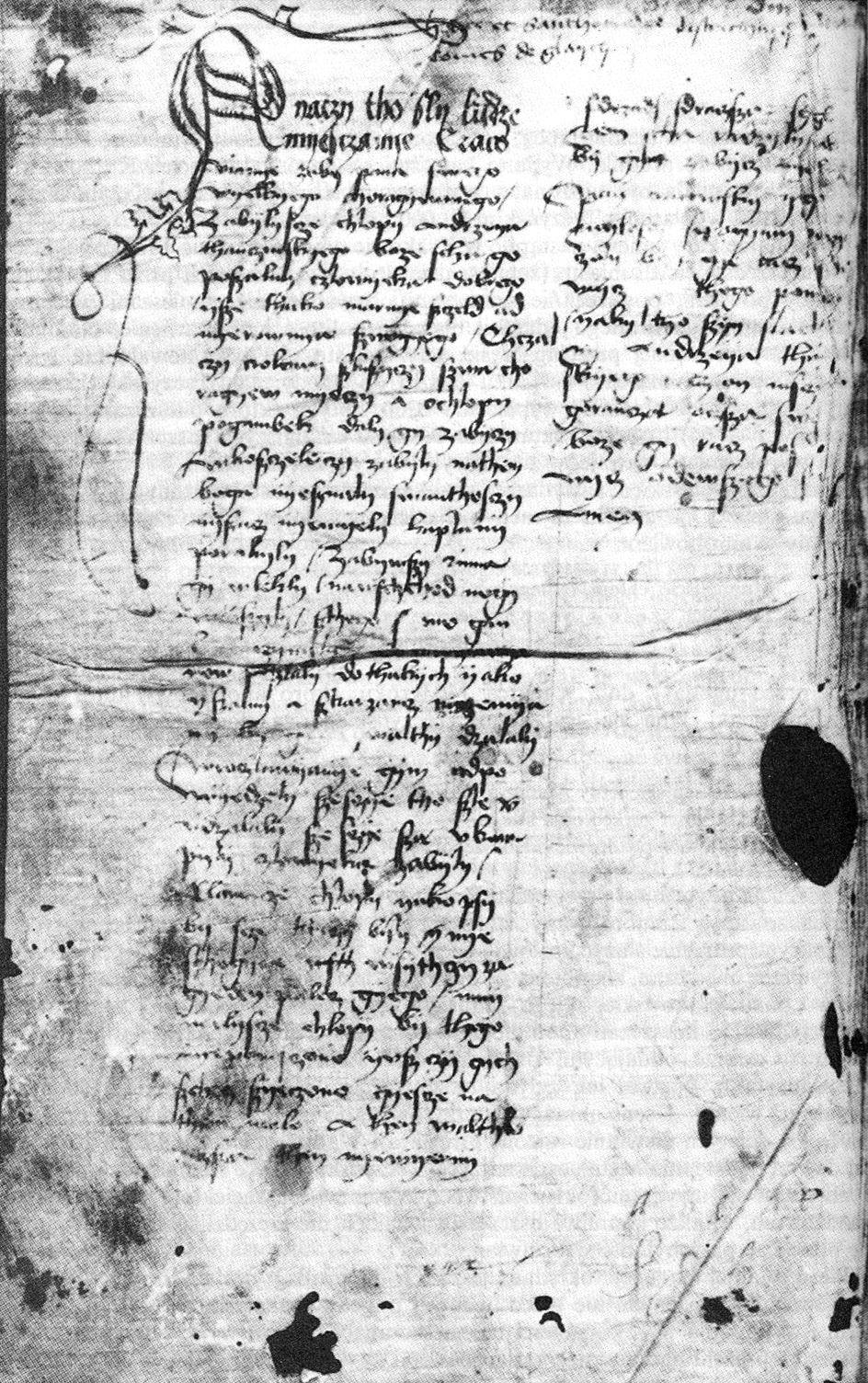
Manuscript of the poem held in the National Library, folio 97

The Song of the Killing of Andrzej Tęczyński (or: Poem on the Killing of Andrzej Tęczyński, inc. And what evil people are the burghers of Kraków... Polish: Pieśń o zabiciu Andrzeja Tęczyńskiego) is an anonymous medieval occasional verse commemorating the murder of Rabsztyn starosta Andrzej Tęczyński committed by Kraków burghers on 16 July 1461.

Originating from the late 15th century, the poem was recorded continuously in two columns on the final page of the Gesta principum Polonorum by Gallus Anonymus, once owned by Jan Długosz. It sides with the slain nobleman's family, calling for vengeance against the burghers. Artistically modest, it holds exceptional value as a literary record of a historical event and a monument of Polish literature. The genre of the Song is debated among literary historians.

The poem was first transcribed in 1848. Its manuscript is held at the National Library of Poland in Warsaw.

== Historical context ==
On 16 July 1461, Andrzej Tęczyński, as starosta (village elder) from Rabsztyn visited Kraków armorer Klemens to collect a renovated suit of armor. Dissatisfied with the work, he paid far less than the agreed 2 złoty – either 18 groszy or 10 (1 złoty equaled ~30 groszy). When Klemens protested, Tęczyński slapped him in his own home. Tęczyński then went to the town hall to file a complaint against the armorer. Klemens was summoned, and as Tęczyński left the hall, he encountered the arrested armorer on the street. According to Długosz, Klemens shouted: "You beat me and shamefully slapped me in my own home, but you won't beat me again". Tęczyński attacked him again, injuring him so severely that Klemens was carried home. City councilors Mikołaj Kridlar and Walter Kesling witnessed the incident. News spread quickly across Kraków.

To prevent riots, city councilors closed the gates and appealed to Queen Elizabeth of Austria. She ordered calm, threatening an 80,000 grzywna fine for violations. The matter was to be judged by King Casimir IV Jagiellon, absent due to the Thirteen Years' War. However, social unrest grew, and a mob took to the streets. Tęczyński barricaded himself in his house on Bracka Street but deemed it unsafe. With his son Spytek Melsztyński and friends, he sought refuge in the Basilica of St. Francis of Assisi. There, he was killed, his body dragged onto the street, desecrated – his beard and mustache singed, dragged through a gutter to the town hall, and left for three days.

Klemens fled Kraków to Wrocław (expelled by its council, he settled in Żagań, where he died). Councilor Mikołaj Kridlar fled to Melsztyn castle. By 20 August, Casimir, in Pomerania, learned of the riots. Nobles in his camp demanded an immediate return to Kraków for revenge. The king promised a fair trial.

On 7 December 1461, the trial began, presided by Piotr of Weszmutowa, with the king, voivodes, and castellans present. Kraków's burghers, commoners, and councilors were accused. Jan Oraczowski, a noble of Śreniawa, defended them. Accusers included Andrzej's brother Jan Tęczyński (1408–1470), demanding the queen's 80,000-grzywna fine, and Andrzej's son Jan Rabsztyński, seeking death penalties. The court sentenced nine Kraków representatives to death and fined the city. On 15 January 1462, six innocent burghers, uninvolved in the case, were executed. The fine, reduced to 6,200 złoty due to the city's financial woes, was partially paid.

Details of the events are known from court records and Jan Długosz's account.

== Poem and historical events ==
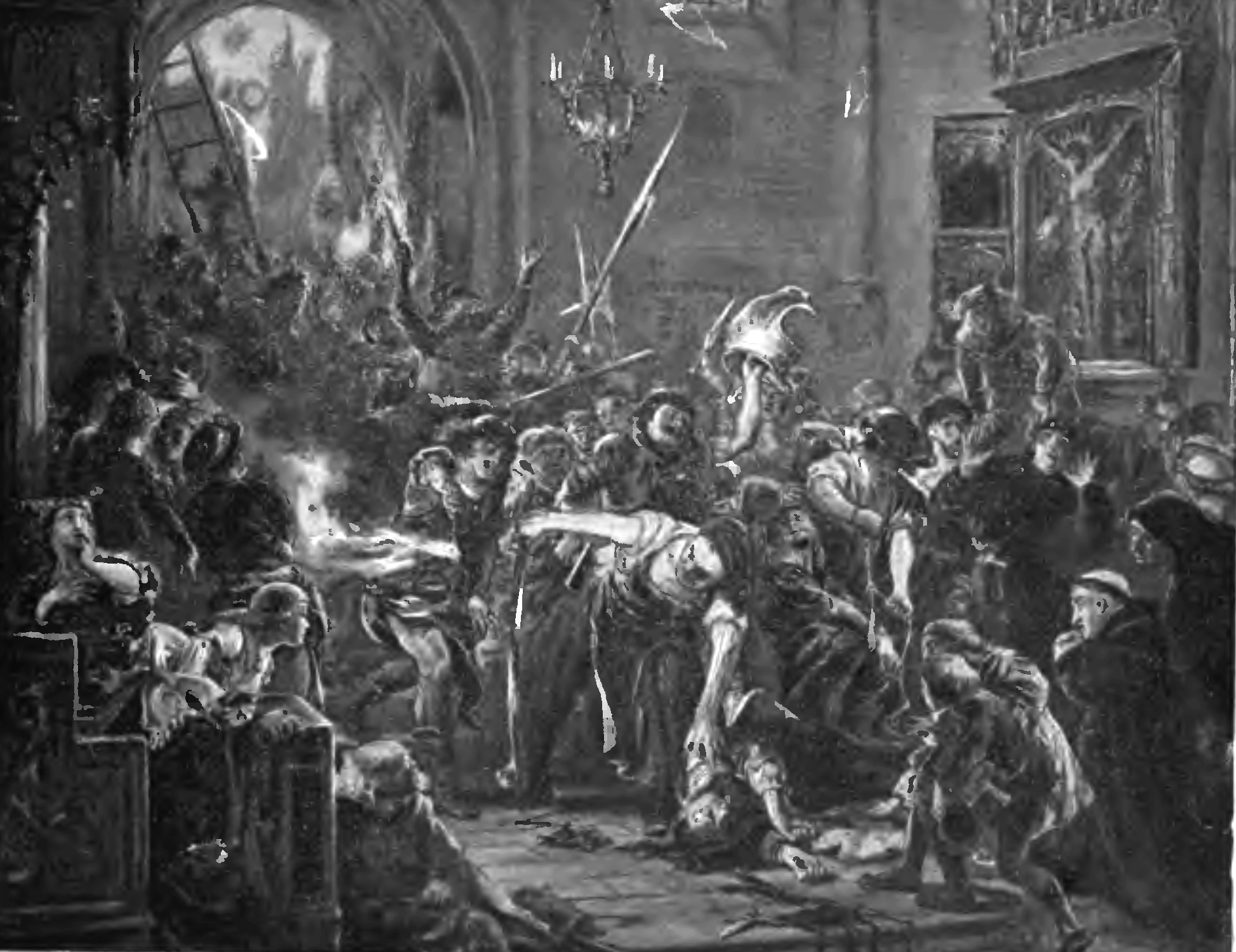
Jan Matejko's painting The Killing of Tęczyński

Written between 15 January 1462 and March 1463, the poem was likely authored by a noble client of the Tęczyński family. The anonymous author firmly supports the starosta, accusing burghers in the opening line. He calls them "dogs" and "peasants", derogatory terms at the time. The poem exaggerates events, including false claims (e.g., burghers injuring priests). It suggests councilors, notably Greglar and Waltek (executed per the verdict), long plotted against Tęczyński. It highlights the violation of church asylum and the murder's brutality, portraying Tęczyński as a valiant knight with panegyric elements praising his kin. The poem agitates against burghers, urging personal vengeance.

== Genre ==
The poem belongs to medieval occasional literature, but its genre is disputed. Teresa Michałowska sees it as a song with news and agitational elements. Jan Lankau views it as news text. Antonina Jelicz considers it a pamphlet, even a clear panegyric. Tadeusz Witczak and Maciej Włodarski describe it as an occasional poem with socio-political pamphlet traits. Juliusz Nowak-Dłużewski classifies it as an elegy. Andrzej Dąbrówka calls it a historical song, as does Stefan Vrtel-Wierczyński, who adds it belongs to medieval Polish epic poetry.

The poem appears under various titles: Pieśń o zamordowaniu Jędrzeja Tęczyńskiego, Pieśń o zabiciu Andrzeja Tęczyńskiego, Pieśń o zabiciu Tęczyńskiego, Pieśń o Tęczyńskim, Wiersz o zabiciu Andrzeja Tęczyńskiego, Wiersz o zamordowaniu Andrzeja Tęczyńskiego.

== Artistic structure ==
The text was written on a medieval manuscript in two narrow columns; the modern division into verses and stanzas results from versification scholars' transcription. Researchers identify 26 lines of varying length, with 80% being 13-, 14-, and 15-syllable lines, rare in Polish medieval poetry. Shorter and longer lines include one 8-, 10-, 12-, 15-, 16-, and 18-syllable line. Rhymes in clauses and motif arrangement suggest five strophes of equal lines. Internal rhymes link the caesura to the clause (e.g., line 12: Do wrocławianów posłali, do takich jako i sami, based on assonance; or line 6: chciał ci krolowi służyci, swą chorągiew mieci, with rhyming final syllables).

Teresa Michałowska proposed a different division, separating syntactic units into lines, yielding a heptasyllabic structure with minor deviations. For example, lines 8–9:

W kościele-ć [j]i zabili, na tem Boga nie znali, (14)
Świątości ni zacz nie mieli, kapłany poranili. (15)

become:

W kościele-ć [j]i zabili, (7)
na tem Boga nie znali, (7)
świątości ni zacz nie mieli, (8)
kapłany poranili. (7)

Michałowska notes that heptasyllabic structure was common in late medieval Poland, seen in religious songs, Christmas songs, Marian songs, other Catholic songs, and secular works. Today, it remains a staple of folk songs.

Likely transcribed from memory, the poem was meant for singing or solo melodeclamation, as suggested by syllabic irregularity and internal rhymes.

== Linguistic features ==
The poem's vocabulary includes many colloquial and vulgar terms. It comprises 13 sentences: 10 dependent, 3 coordinate, with one question (Mnimaliście, chłopi, by tego nie pomszczono?), and eight exclamatory. The term "peasants" (chłopi) does not equate burghers with farmers; in Old Polish, it meant "people" (per Samuel Linde's dictionary) or "foolish" (per Franciszek Sławski's etymological dictionary). Thus, line 7's chłopi pogębek translates as "foolish slap".

== Manuscript history ==
Written in the late 15th century on the last free page (97 verso) of the so-called Zamoyski Codex – containing the oldest known copy of Gallus Anonymus' Gesta principum Polonorum from the 14th century – the parchment manuscript belonged to Jan Długosz, then the Zamoyski family entail, and now resides in the National Library of Poland in Warsaw (signature rps BOZ 28). First published by Kazimierz Władysław Wóycicki in 1848 in his Album Literacki (vol. I, chapter Pieśń polska z r. 1462 o zabiciu Andrzeja Tęczyńskiego), it received critical analysis in 1886 by Władysław Nehring in Ein Lied (?) auf die Ermordung des Fahnenträgres Andreas Tenczyński am 16. Juli 1461 in Krakau (in Altpolnische Sprachdenkmäler, Berlin).

== Bibliography ==
- Michałowska, Teresa (2002). Średniowiecze [The Middle Ages] (in Polish). Warsaw: Wydawnictwo Naukowe PWN. ISBN 83-01-13842-4.
- Włodarski, Maciej (1998). "Wstęp" [Introduction]. Polska poezja świecka XV wieku [Polish Secular Poetry of the 15th Century] (in Polish). Wrocław: Zakład Narodowy im. Ossolińskich. ISBN 83-04-04378-5.
