= Michał Awdaniec =

11th century polish chancellor

Michał Awdaniec (died c. 1115) was a chancellor to king Bolesław III Wrymouth of the Kingdom of Poland around the years 1112-1113. (Note: Books I and II of the Gesta contain a dedication to Chancellor Michael, among others) He was a part of the Awdańcy clan, and was likely the person who ordered or sponsored Gallus Anonymus's chronicle, Gesta principum Polonorum.
