= Selencia =

12th-century southern Baltic ethnic and political entity

Selencia was an early 12th-century entity at or near the southern coast of the Baltic Sea, mentioned only in the chronicles of Gallus Anonymus, who listed it as one of three northern neighbors of Piast Poland around 1115 (the other ones being "Pomorania" and "Pruzia." It has been proposed that Selencia was a misspelling of Luticia, or that Selencia was a short-lived state centered on the Oder estuary, probably destroyed when in 1122 Boleslaw III Wrymouth of Poland defeated, according to the annals of Cracow, a "Zuetopolc dux Odrensis."

== Gallus Anonymus ==
Selencia is mentioned twice in the first book of Gallus Anonymus' Gesta principum Polonorum (The Poles' princes' deeds), a chronicle composed in Piast Poland between 1112 and 1118 to glorify the Piast dynasty in general, and the contemporary Piast ruler Boleslaw III Wrymouth in particular. The first mention is written in the present tense, describing Boleslaw III Wrymouth's fight against his pagan neighbors at the Baltic Sea - Selencians, Pomeranians and Old Prussians, while the second mention refers to Boleslaw I Chrobry's fight against the same peoples.
