= Great Lechia =

Alleged lost Polish empire

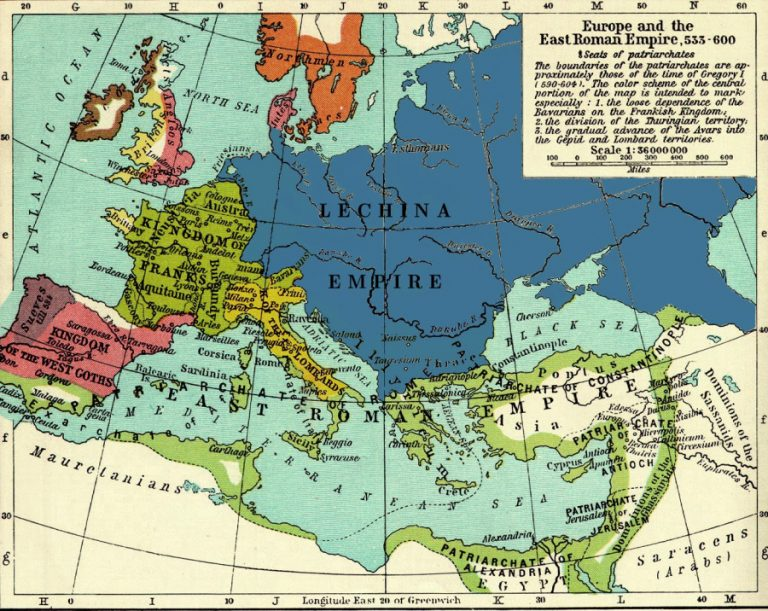
A falsified English-language map of Europe in the 7th century showing the supposed reach of the Lechite Empire

The Great Lechia (Polish: Wielka Lechia), also known as the Lechite Empire, and Lechian Empire (Polish: Imperium Lechitów), is a name for a fictional country from a pseudohistorical conspiracy theory which argues that Poland, prior to its Christianization, was a vast empire whose existence is now denied as a result of its history being falsified.

The theory was present in niche circles since the 19th century, and during the interwar period. It gained prominence on the Internet around 2016 among uncritical enthusiasts of Slavic history, and among young people. Believers of the Great Lechia theory are humorously referred to as "Turbo-Lechites" (turbolechici) or "Turbo-Slavs" (turbosłowianie).

== Tenets ==
The alleged histories of the Lechite Empire tend to be very diverse and mutually inconsistent. The theory has been compared to the Tartarian Empire. Historian Adam Wójcik differentiated three types of "Turboslavs": those who claim that Slavs have lived in Poland at least since the Bronze Age, those who believe that perhaps the empire did not exist, but "some state or culture and civilization" of Polish Slavs existed before Duke Mieszko I, and those who try to prove that Slavs "were the first people on Earth, invented the wheel, and that Adam and Eve spoke Polish".

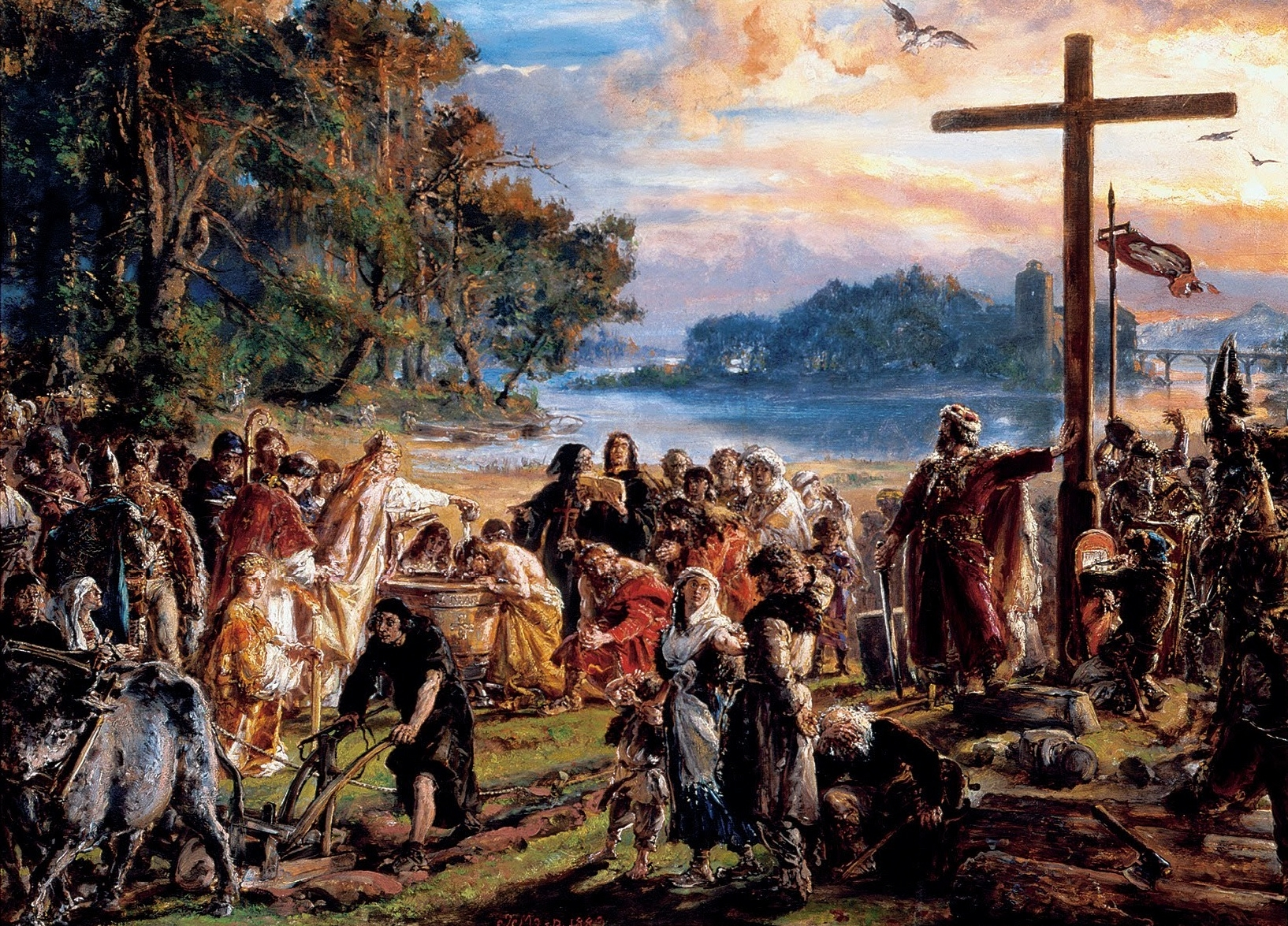
"Turbolechites" consider the Christianization of Poland the end of the Lechite Empire

According to the believers of the conspiracy theory, Poland, before its Christianization in 966, was an empire referred to as the Lechite Empire or the Great Lechia. The empire encompassed most of Europe, stretching from the Rhine or Loire in the west to the Ural Mountains in the east, and from the Baltic Sea in the north to the Adriatic and Black seas in the south. Cultural influences of the "ancient Polish state" reached far beyond its borders, and the empire was strong enough to effectively contain the Roman Empire's expansion. Some theories say that the Lechite Empire defeated Alexander the Great, Julius Caesar, and conquered France and Spain.

"Turbolechites" negate the allochthonous theory of Slavic origins, claiming that all Slavs (referred to as Lechites) lived in Central and Eastern Europe 3000–3800, or even 11,000, years ago and were representatives of the Aryan race. Lechites were worshipped as a master race, as supposedly evidenced by the Semitic word lah (as in Allah) meaning "God". The Great Lechia narratives occasionally incorporate paranormal elements. Some "Turbolechitic" theories claim that ancient Slavs descended from aliens who came to Earth from beyond the Milky Way.

The theory rests on the assumption that the official history of Poland has been falsified, leaving Poles unaware of their country's "true" history. The perpetrators of this falsification are said to be external actors—Germans, Christians, or Jews—who aimed to usurp the Lechites' hegemonic position in Europe and in the world. Proponents of the Great Lechia theory accuse historians of being incompetent or of being complicit in the conspiracy and deliberately spreading misinformation.

== Spread ==
Conspiracy theories about the Great Lechia have their origins in Kronika Prokosza, a 19th-century publication describing a falsified history of Poland. They also reference the Sarmatism ideology. The theory was said to have been popularized by Janusz Bieszk's publications Słowiańscy królowie Lechii. Polska starożytna [Slavic Kings of Lechia. Ancient Poland] (2014) and Starożytne Królestwo Lehii. Kolejne dowody [The Ancient Kingdom of Lechia. Further Evidence] (2019).

== Criticism ==
Historians emphasize the pseudoscientific nature of the theory due to its complete incompatibility with the requirements applied to historical works in modern science. Educational campaigns were organised, such as the temporary exhibition Wielka Lechia – wielka ściema ("Great Lechia – great hoax") at the Museum of the Origins of the Polish State in Gniezno, aimed at exposing the fanciful nature of the phenomenon.

== See also ==
- Stanisław Szukalski
- Lech, Czech, and Rus
- Pan-Slavism
- Tartarian Empire
