= Ludwik Ćwikliński =

Polish classical philologist (1853 – 1942)

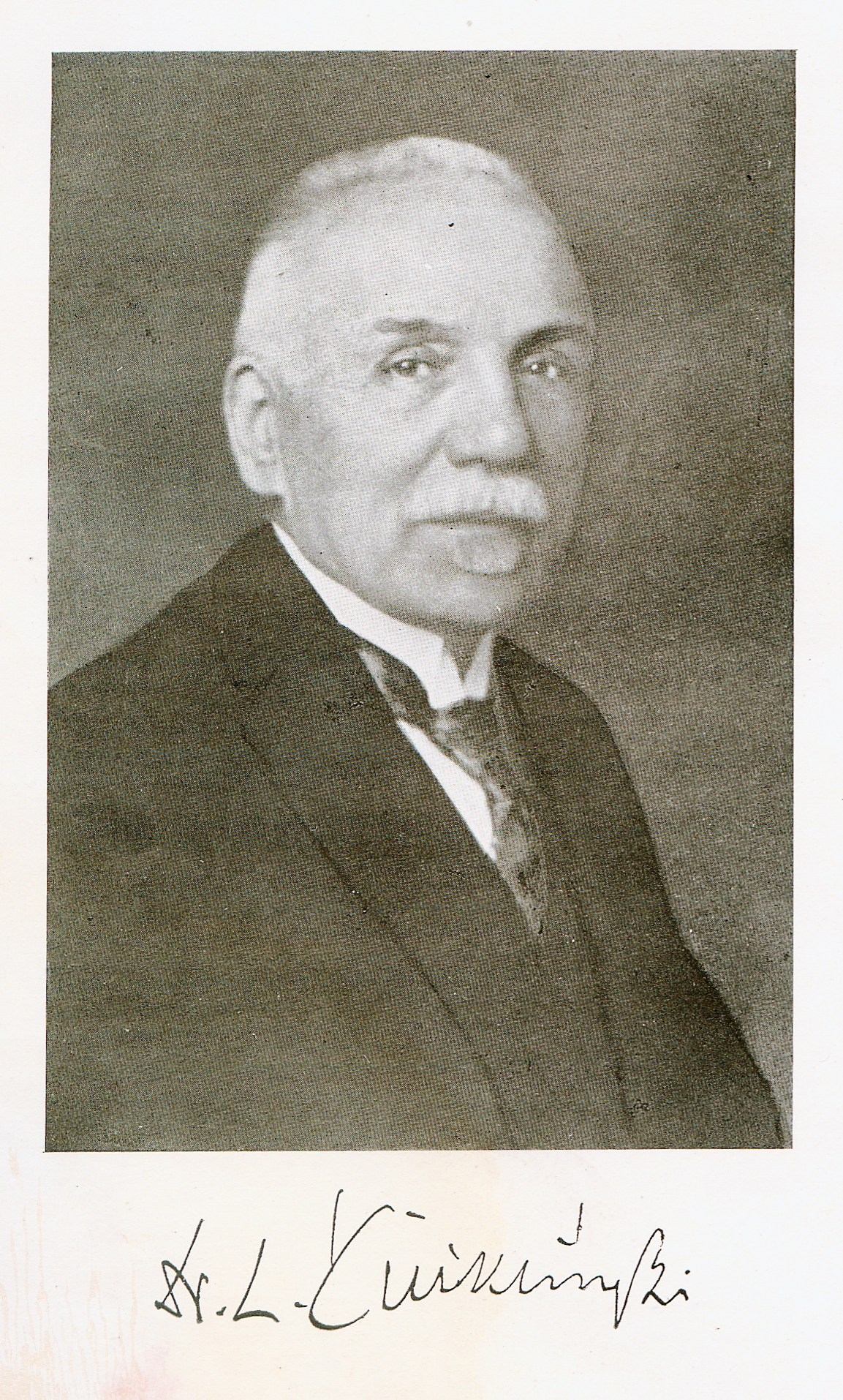
- Ćwikliński in 1933
- Born: 17 July 1853; Gnesen, Kingdom of Prussia
- Died: 3 October 1942 (aged 89); Kraków

Academic background
- Education: University of Breslau; University of Berlin (PhD)
- Thesis: Quaestiones de tempore, quo Thiicidides priorem historiae suae partem composuerit (1873)
- Doctoral advisor: Johann Gustav Droysen

Ludwik Ćwikliński (17 July 1853 – 3 October 1942) was a Polish classical philologist, professor and rector of Lviv University (1893–1894), editor of "Eos" magazine (1894–1901). Between 1899 and 1902 he was a member of the Austrian parliament, and he was the Austrian Minister of Education between 1917 and 1918.

== Biography ==
=== Early life and Lviv ===
Ćwikliński was born in 1853 in Gniezno to Wojciech Ćwikliński, a church organist, and Cecylia Buszkiewicz. He completed primary education and gymnasium at Gniezno, learning ancient cultures, ancient Greek, and Latin. After obtaining his matura on 12 March 1870, he began attending the University of Breslau, studying classical philology and history. He transferred to the University of Berlin after a year. He defended his doctoral dissertation — Quaestiones de tempore, quo Thiicidides priorem historiae suae partem composuerit, concerning the chronology of the first part of Thucydides' History of the Peloponnesian War — on 22 December 1873, obtaining a doctorate in philosophy. His doctoral advisor was Johann Gustav Droysen.

In 1874, after sitting a teachers' exam, Ćwikliński received a teaching certificate that licensed him to teach Latin, Greek, French, German, history and geography in secondary schools. He briefly taught ancient languages at a gymnasium in Berlin in 1875, before being nominated as a professor at the University of Lviv on 16 May 1873. In his 23 years as a professor there, he taught philology, classical archaeology and ancient history, receiving tenure on 11 November 1879. He served as dean of the university's faculty of philosophy in 1883–1884 and 1890–1891, and was inaugurated as the university's rector on 11 October 1893. As rector, he commissioned a work on the history of the University of Lviv (published in 1894), while also organizing and opening the university's archives and opening a faculty for medicine. The position also granted him a seat in the Diet of Galicia and Lodomeria.

=== Austrian politics ===
In 1896, Ćwikliński was elected as a councilor of the city of Lviv. This was followed in 1899 with his appointment to the Imperial Council for the cities of Ternopil and Berezhany. On 26 February 1902, he was appointed as an imperial councilor of the Imperial-Royal Ministry of Worship and Education, resulting in his departure from the University of Lviv in March of the same year. As a councilor, he focused his efforts on the Polish school system, working to improve science and education in Lesser Poland.

On 30 August 1917, Ćwikliński was appointed Minister of Worship and Education. He resigned alongside the rest of the Cisleithanian cabinet on 25 July 1918.

=== Professorship in Vilnius ===
After the end of World War I, Ćwikliński applied for a chair position at the University of Poznań. However, on 20 April 1920, he was appointed chairman of classical philology at the University of Stephen Báthory. He was made an honorary professor of the University of Poznań on 11 July 1927.

In September 1939, after the outbreak of World War II, Ćwikliński was arrested by the Germans in Poznań after refusing to sign the Deutsche Volksliste. He was then sent to either Fort VII or Chełmno. After his release, Ćwikliński was moved to another concentration camp in Poznań and then to Kraków, where he died on 3 October 1942. He was buried in Rakowice Cemetery.
