= Gesta principum Polonorum =

Medieval chronicle from Poland

- Cronicae et gesta ducum sive principum Polonorum
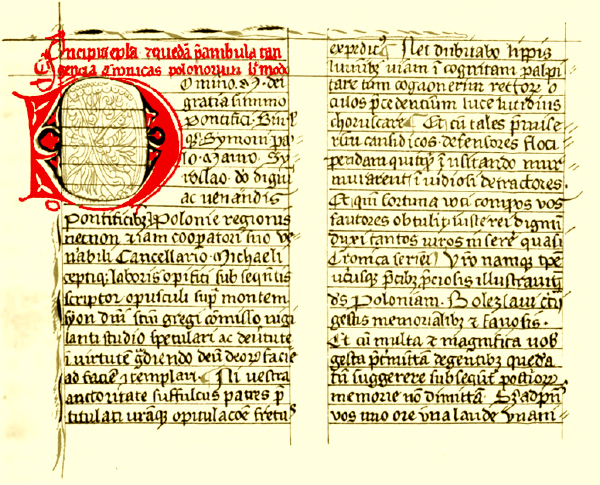
- Author(s): Anonymous (see Gallus Anonymus)
- Patron: Unclear
- Language: Medieval Latin
- Date: Between c. 1112 – c. 1118
- Provenance: Unclear
- Authenticity: Authentic, but surviving only in later manuscripts
- Principal manuscript(s): Codex Zamoyscianus (National Library of Poland Ms. BOZ cim. 28), Codex Czartoryscianus (Czartoryski Museum of Kraków Ms. 1310), Heilsberg Codex (National Library of Poland Ms. 8006)
- Genre: Historical narrative; gesta
- Subject: The reign of Boleslaus III Wrymouth (books ii and iii); Wrymouth's ancestors (book i)
- Period covered: c. 800 – c. 1113 (mainly c. 1080 – c. 1113)

The Gesta principum Polonorum (Medieval Latin: [ˈgɛsta ˈprinʲtʃipum pɔlɔˈnɔːrum]; "Deeds of the Princes of the Poles") is the oldest known medieval chronicle documenting the history of Poland from the legendary times until 1113. Written in Latin by an anonymous author, it was most likely completed between 1112 and 1118, and its extant text is present in three manuscripts with two distinct traditions. Its anonymous author is traditionally called Gallus (a name which means "Gaul"), a foreigner and outcast from an unknown country, who travelled to the Kingdom of Poland via Hungary. Gesta was likely commissioned by Poland's then ruler, Boleslaus III Wrymouth, or his chancellor, Michał Awdaniec; Gallus expected a prize for his work, which he most likely received and off which he lived the rest of his life.

The book is the earliest known, written document on Polish history. It gives a unique perspective on the general history of Europe, supplementing what has been handed down by Western and Southern European historians. It follows the Gesta Danorum and the next major source on the early history of Poland, the Chronica seu originale regum et principum Poloniae, older by roughly a century.

The oldest known copy of the work is currently owned by National Library of Poland in Warsaw.

== Title ==
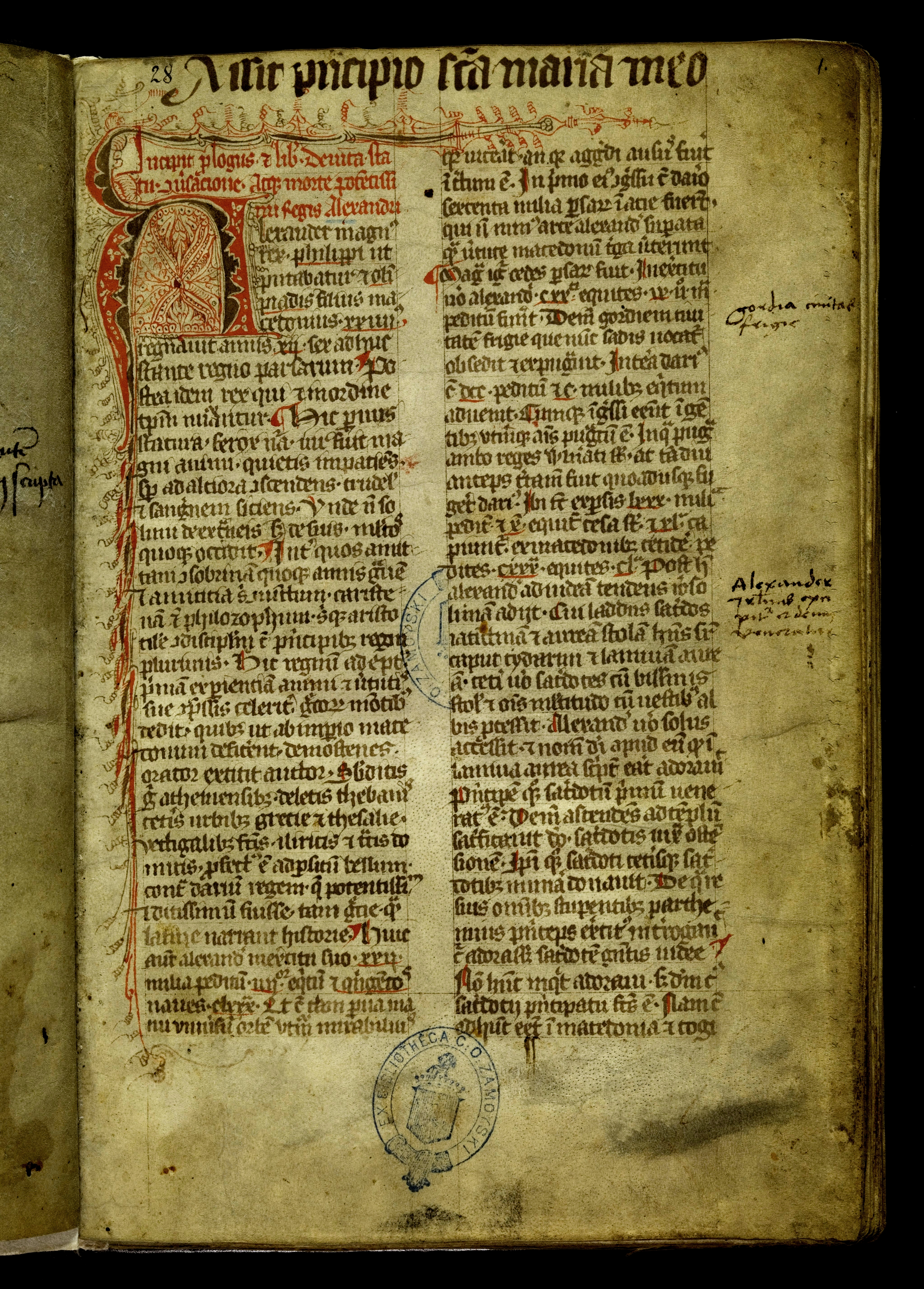
Beginning of Gesta principum Polonorum (Codex Zamoyscianus held at the National Library of Poland).

The title intended for or originally given to the work is not clear. In the initial capital of the text in the Zamoyski Codex, a rubric styles the work the Cronica Polonorum, while in the same manuscript the preface of Book I opens with Incipiunt Cronice et gesta ducum sive principum Polonorum ("[Here] begins the chronicles and deeds of the dukes or princes of the Poles"). The incipit for Book II entitles the work Liber Tertii Bolezlaui ("Book of Boleslaus III"), and that for Book III Liber de Gestis Boleslaui III ("Book of the Deeds of Boleslaus III"). These however are not reliable as such things are often added later.

The latest editors and only English translators of the text style it Gesta principum Polonorum ("the deeds of the princes of the Poles"), primarily to acknowledge its faith with the gesta genre (and the likely authenticity of this part of the title) and to avoid confusion with the later work known as the Chronica principum Poloniae ("chronicle of the princes of Poland").

== Author ==
The author of the Gesta is unknown, but is referred to by historiographic convention as "Gallus", a Latin word for a "person from France or Gaul" (though also, potentially, a forename). Author's anonymity though, was done on purpose due to his\hers (as mentioned in the work) desire to dedicate the work to God only, a notion widely popular in the medieval times. When Polish bishop Marcin Kromer completed his work (Folio 199), he left a footnote in it that credited Gallus as the author of Gesta which he brought up in the work. It roughly read: This work is by Gallus, I reckon he was a French monk, the one who lived during the times of Boleslaus III. It was the very first time when the author was referred to as "Gallus".

In Gottfried Lengnich's printed edition, Lengnich named the author as "Martin Gallus" based on a misreading of Jan Długosz, where Gallus was conflated with Martin of Opava. Martin Gallus became the standard name in German scholarship for some time to come, though this identification is now rejected by most historians. Historian Maximilian Gumplowicz identified the author as Baldwin Gallus, allegedly Bishop of Kruszwica, though likewise this theory has failed to gain general acceptance.

There have been frequent attempts to identify Gallus's origins from clues in the text . Marian Plezia and Pierre David both argued that Gallus came from Provence in what is now southern France, and was closely connected with the Benedictine monastery of Saint-Gilles. Another historian, Karol Maleczyński, argued that the evidence suggests a connection with Flanders, while Danuta Borawska and Tomasz Jasiński have argued based on stylistic evidence that he was connected with Venice and that he authored an anonymous translatio of St Nicholas. Marian Plezia argued in 1984 that his writing style suggests an education in one of the schools of central France, likely Tours or Orléans.

Plezia and others further argue that Gallus's extensive knowledge of Hungary testify to connections there, postulating a connection to the Benedictine monastery of Somogyvár in Hungary, a daughter-house of St Gilles'. He appears to have been closely connected to the Awdańcy clan, a kindred of Norse or Rus origin who had been successful under Boleslaus II, and who had been exiled to Hungary but returned to prominence in Polish affairs during the reign of Boleslaus III. As he stated that "the city of Gniezno ... means "nest" in Slavonic, it is thought that the author may have known the language of the country. All that is certain is that he was a monk and a foreigner living in Poland, perhaps on a Polish benefice.

== Date ==
Generally, it is thought that the original text was composed at some point between 1112 and 1117. The dedicatory letter on the preface of the Gesta fixes completion of the origin text between 1112 and 1118. The last event mentioned in the work is the pilgrimage of Boleslaus III to Székesfehérvár in Hungary, which occurred in either 1112 or 1113. The work was almost certainly completed before the revolt of Skarbimir in 1117–18. There is some evidence that several interpolations were added subsequently. For instance, there is reference to the descendants of Duke Swietobor of Pomerania (ii.29).

== The narrative ==
The work begins with an address and dedication to Martin, Archbishop of Gniezno, Chancellor Michał Awdaniec, and to the bishops of Poland's regions, Simon (Bishop of Plock, c. 1102–29), Paul (Bishop of Poznań, 1098–c. 1112), Maurus (Bishop of Kraków, 1110–18) and Zyroslaw (Bishop of Wroclaw, 1112–20). Thomas Bisson argued that the text was primarily written in the gesta genre of Latin literature as a celebration of Duke Boleslaus III Wrymouth, defending his actions and legimizing his dynasty (compare the near-contemporary Deeds of Louis the Fat).

The work is divided into three books, focused on genealogy, politics and warfare. Book one, of 31 chapters, treats the deeds of the ancestors of Boleslaus III (beginning with the legendary Piast the Wheelwright), and their wars against the neighbouring Germanic and Slavic peoples such as the Rus, the Bohemians, the Pomeranians, the Mazovians and the obscure Selencians (Shilingians, Silezians). The first Book claims to rely on oral tradition, and is largely legendary in character until the reign of Mieszko I. The earlier material tells of the rises of the Piasts from peasants to ruler, a tale common in early Slavonic folk-myth.

Book two, of 50 chapters, traces the birth of Boleslaus, his boyhood deeds and documents the wars waged by himself and "count palatine" Skarbimir against the Pomeranians. Book three, of 26 chapters, continues the story of the wars waged by Boleslaus and the Poles against the Pomeranians, the war against the German emperor Heinrich V and the Bohemians, and against the Baltic Prussians.

== Manuscripts and prints ==
The Gesta is not extant in the original, but instead survives in three different manuscripts representing two different traditions. The Codex Zamoyscianus (Z) and Codex Czartoryscianus (S) represent the first, and earliest documented tradition, the latter being derived from the former. The Heilsberg codex, though later and surviving in less detail, is an independent witness to the text and constitutes the second distinct tradition.

=== Codex Zamoyscianus ===
The earliest version lies in the manuscript known as the Codex Zamoyscianus or Zamoyski Codex. This was written down in the late 14th-century, probably in Kraków between 1380 and 1392. It was located in the library of the Łaski family until the 15th century. Thereabouts Sandivogius of Czechel, a canon of Gniezno Cathedral and friend of the historian Jan Długosz, came into possession of it. It was later in the library of the counts of Zamość, but is now in the National Library in Warsaw as Ms. BOZ cim. 28. From May 2024, the manuscript is presented at a permanent exhibition in the Palace of the Commonwealth. The poem Song of the Killing of Andrzej Tęczyński was recorded continuously in two columns on the final page.

=== Codex Czartoryscianus ===
A second version of the Gesta lies in the Codex Czartoryscianus, also called the Sędziwój Codex. Between 1434 and 1439 Sandivogius of Czechło had a second copy made for him, produced from the version in the Codex Zamoyscianus. As it is a direct copy, its usefulness is limited in reconstructing the original text. This version currently lies in the Czartoryski Museum of Kraków, Ms. 1310, fols. 242–307.

=== Heilsberg Codex ===
The third and latest witness to the text is the version in the so-called Heilsberg Codex. This version was written down between 1469 and 1471, based on an earlier version. The latter had been written at Kraków around 1330, was in Łekno monastery (Greater Poland) in 1378, and had been transferred to the monastery at Trzemeszno before coming into the hands of Martin Kromer, Bishop of Warmia (1579–1589).

Between the mid-16th century and the 18th century, the manuscript was located in the German-speaking Prussian town of Heilsberg (today the Polish town of Lidzbark Warmiński), hence the name. Unlike the version in the Codex Czartoryscianus, this is an independent witness to the original text. It is currently in the National Library in Warsaw as Ms. 8006, fols. 119–247.

The Heilsberg text omits large sections of text present in the other two manuscripts, for instance omitting several chapters like 27 and 28 in Book I.

== Printed editions ==
The text of the Gesta was printed for the first time in 1749, when an edition based on the Heilsberg Codex was published by Gottfried Lengnich, reprinted two decades later by Laurence Mizler de Kolof, and has since been printed in many editions. Knoll & Schaer

- Gottfried Lengnich (ed.), Vincentius Kadlubko et Martinus Gallus scriptores historiae Polonae vetustissimi cum duobus anonymis ex ms. bibliothecae episcopalis Heilsbergensis edititi, (Danzig, 1749)
- Laurence Mizler de Kolof (ed.), Historiarum Poloniae et Magni Ducatus Lithuaniae Scriptorum Quotquot Ab Initio Reipublicae Polonae Ad Nostra Usque Temporar Extant Omnium Collectio Magna, (Warsaw, 1769)
- Jan Wincenty Bandtkie (ed.), Martini Galli Chronicon Ad Fidem Codicum: Qui Servantur In Pulaviensi Tabulario Celsissimi Adami Principis Czartoryscii, Palatini Regni Poloniarum/ Denuo Recensuit ..., (Warsaw, 1824)
- J. Szlachtowski and P. Koepke, Chronica et Annales Aevi Salici, in Georg Henirich Pertz (ed.), Monumenta Germaniae Historica, (Hannover, 1851), SS IX, pp. 414–78
- A. Bielowski (ed.), Monumenta Poloniae Historica, (Lemberg, 1864) pp. 379–484
- Ludwig Finkel & Stanisław Kętrzyński (eds.), Galli Anonymi Chronicon, (Lemberg, 1898)
- Julian Krzyżanowski (ed.), Galla Anonima Kronika : Podobizna Fotograficzna Rekopisu Zamoyskich z Wieku XIV. Wyda i Wstepem Opatrzy Julian Krzyzanowski./ Galli anonymi Chronicon codicis saeculi XIV Zamoscianus appellati reproductio paleographica, (Warsaw, 1946)
- Karol Maleczyński (ed.), Galli Anonymi Cronica et Gesta Ducum sive Principum Polonorum/ Anonima tzw. Galla Kronika Czyli Dzieje Książąt i Władców Polskich, (Kraków, 1952)
- Ljudmila Mikhailovna Popova (ed.), Gall Anonim, Khronika u Deianiia Kniazei ili Pravitelei Polskikh, (Moscow, 1961)
- Josef Bujnoch, Polens Anfänge: Gallus Anonymus, Chronik und Taten de Herzöge und Fürsten von Polen, (Graz, Styria, 1978)
- Knoll & Schaer (eds.), Gesta Principum Polonorum: The Deeds of the Princes of the Poles, (Budapest, 2003)

Jan Wincenty Bandtkie, who also used Heilsberg, was the first to utilise the Codex Zamoyscianus tradition. As the Heilsberg Codex was "lost" between the 1830s and the 1890s, texts in this period make no original use of it. Finkel & Kętrzyński's 1898 edition likewise makes no use of Heilsberg. Julian Krzyżanowski produced the first facsimile in the 1940s, while in the 1950s Karol Maleczyński's edition was the first to collate all three manuscripts.

The text has been fully translated several times. It was translated into Polish by Roman Grodescki by 1923, though this was not published until 1965. There was a Russian translation in 1961, a German translation in 1978 and an English translation in 2003.
