= Summa de casibus poenitentiae =

13th-century religious guidebook

The Summa de casibus poenitentiae (Summary Concerning the Cases of Penance) is a book written from 1224 to 1226 by Raymond of Penyafort. It is a guide for members of the Dominican Order when hearing confessions. The work was later revised and annotated by William of Rennes between 1234 and 1245.

== Composition ==
Page from a manuscript of the Summa (MS. Tanner 335, Bodleyan Library, Oxford ) showing the initial Q with a dragon.

Raymond's work relied heavily on Gratian's Decretum Gratiani. Raymond put forth the argument that acting in defense of yourself or your property could only occur when an attack was already under way and you were repelling it, or if an attack was imminent. Accordingly, Raymond put defending yourself and offensive actions in juxtaposition, as defense concerned the immediate future and the present, and offense was an act of vengeance for actions which had already been committed.

== Summa de Matrimonio ==
Following up on poenitentiae, Raymond wrote a Summa de Matrimonio, about issues of marriage. This second work was often appended to the Summa de casibus poenitentiae and was also included together with it, as its fourth and final part, in the printed editio princeps in 1603.

== Bibliography ==
- Binski, Paul; Zutshi, Patrick (2011). Western Illuminated Manuscripts: A Catalogue of the Collection in Cambridge University Library. Cambridge University Press. ISBN 978-0521848923.
- Davies, Brian (2014). Thomas Aquinas's Summa Theologiae: A Guide and Commentary. Oxford University Press. ISBN 978-0199380626.
- de Pennaforti, Raimundus; de Friburgo, Johannes (1715). Summa de Poenitentia et Matrimonio. Avenione Cathedral.
- Payer, Pierre J. (2005). Summa on Marriage (PDF) (Translation ed.). Pontifical Institute of Mediaeval Studies. ISBN 0-88844-291-2.
- Reichberg, Gregory M. (2014). "Catholic Christianity". In Reichberg, Gregory M.; Syse, Henrik; Hartwell, Nicole M. (eds.). Religion, War, and Ethics: A Sourcebook of Textual Traditions. Cambridge University Press. pp. 76–163. ISBN 978-0521450386.
- Szabó, Kinga Tibori (2011). Anticipatory Action in Self-Defence: Essence and Limits under International Law. Springer. ISBN 978-9067047951.
