= Gesta Regum Britanniae =

The Gesta Regum Britanniae (Latin: Deeds of the Kings of Britain) is a Latin epic written at some time between 1235 and 1254, and attributed to a Breton monk, William of Rennes.

The Gesta is fundamentally a versification of Geoffrey of Monmouth's Historia Regum Britanniae in Latin epic hexameters. It retains Geoffrey's overall sequence and structure, but expands upon those elements and stories which had the greatest dramatic potential, while treating other sections more cursorily. William omits the Prophecies of Merlin section of the Historia, as Wace did in his earlier Roman de Brut. William may have read Geoffrey's Vita Merlini, but otherwise does not intrude any elements of the (by then very copious) Arthurian legend into his adaptation of the Historia.

The form of the Gesta was inspired by Walter of Châtillon's Alexandreis. It is divided into ten books, each of which is prefaced by a terse summary of its contents, also in verse. The entire poem is 4,923 lines long, each book being about 500 lines in length.
