= Chronicon Polono-Silesiacum =

Medieval Polish chronicle

Chronicon Polono-Silesiacum (Polish: Kronika polsko-śląska, Polish-Silesian Chronicle) or simply Chronicon Polonorum is a medieval Polish chronicle based on Wincenty Kadłubek's Chronica seu originale regum et principum Poloniae and the anonymous poem Carmen Mauri, with additional information on the history of Silesia. The date of its creation is uncertain and estimated at late 13th century, circa 1280 or at the turn of the century. The unknown author might have been a Cistercian monk from the Lubiąż Abbey.

The work was likely ordered by Henry IV of Silesia.

Its text edited as Chronicon Polonorum/Kronika Polska by Ludwik Ćwikliński was published 1878 in Monumenta Poloniae Historica, vol. 3.

== Editions ==
- Anonymous; et al. (Nakł. Akademii Umiejętności) (1878). "Chronica Polonorum". In Ćwikliński, Ludwik (ed.). Monumenta Poloniae historica: Pomniki dziejowe Polski. Vol. 3. Lwów: Gubrynowicz i Schmidt. pp. 607–609. (in Latin)
