= Przybysław Dyjamentowski =

Polish forger (1694–1774)

Przybysław Dyjamentowski (1694–1774) was a notable Polish documents forger and writer. In his lifetime he prepared several "ancient" chronicles, diplomas and genealogies for sale.

Dyjamentowski's forgeries were not always recognised as such, although they are now regarded as entirely pseudohistorical, and have at times been influential, even in the twenty-first century among a minority of Polish nationalists.

== Prokosz Chronicle ==
One of Dyjamentowski's best known works is the Prokosz Chronicle, also known as the Slavic-Sarmatian Chronicle, which gained much popularity as one of the earliest mentions of Poland (dated to 936). The forged chronicle was first published in 1825 by Hipolit Kownacki. The chronicle was supposed to stretch back the existence of Poland as an independent nation by a few generations beyond the accepted start of the Piast dynasty and support a connection between mediaeval Poles and ancient Sarmatians and peoples of East India.

== See also ==
- Sarmatism
