= Raymond of Peñafort =

Dominican Master General and archbishop and saint (c. 1367–1439)

Saint Raymond of Penyafort OP
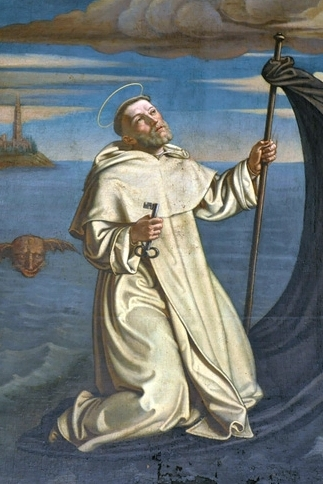

Confessor
- Born: c. 1175; Santa Margarida i els Monjos, Crown of Aragon
- Died: 6 January 1275 (aged 99–100); Barcelona, Crown of Aragon
- Venerated in: Catholic Church
- Beatified: 1542, Rome by Pope Paul III
- Canonized: 29 April 1601, Rome by Pope Clement VIII
- Major shrine: Cathedral of the Holy Cross and Saint Eulalia; Barcelona, Catalonia, Spain
- Feast: 7 January
- Attributes: skimming across the sea with his cape as both boat and sail
- Patronage: canon lawyers; all types of lawyers, Barcelona, Kingdom of Navarre

Raymond of Peñafort OP (Catalan: Sant Ramon de Penyafort, IPA: [ˈsan rəˈmon də ˌpɛɲəˈfɔɾ]; c. 1175 – 6 January 1275) was a Dominican friar who was a canon lawyer. He compiled the Decretals of Gregory IX, a collection of canonical laws that remained a major part of Church law until the 1917 Code of Canon Law abrogated it. He was canonized by Pope Clement VIII in 1601 and is the patron saint of canon lawyers.

He wrote one of the first manuals for user of the inquisitors, the Directorium inquisitoriale (1242).

== Life ==
Raymond of Penyafort was born in Santa Margarida i els Monjos, a small town near Barcelona, Principality of Catalonia, c. 1175. Descended from a noble family with ties to the royal house of Aragon, he was educated in Barcelona and at the University of Bologna, where he received doctorates in both civil and canon law. From 1195 to 1210, he taught canon law. In 1210, he moved to Bologna, where he remained until 1222, including three years occupying the Chair of canon law at the university. He came to know the newly founded Dominican Order there. Raymond was attracted to the Dominican Order by the preaching of Blessed Reginald, prior of the Dominicans of Bologna, and received the habit at the age of 47, in the Dominican Convent of Barcelona, to which he had returned from Italy in 1222.

=== Mercedarians ===
Tradition credits Raymond as a cofounder of the Mercedarian Order along with King James I and St Peter Nolasco. This is highly unlikely. In 1218, the traditional date for this foundation, Raymond was not in Barcelona where this event is said to have taken place. He was in Bologna and would not return to Barcelona until 1222. King James, furthermore, was only ten years old in 1218. This tradition was created in the fifteenth century to endow a growing order with a history as distinguished as that of the Franciscans or Dominicans.

The need to study Semitic languages was affirmed by the General Chapter of the Dominican Order in Paris in 1236. Raymond established the first school of the Studia Linguarum in Tunis, where it was known as the Studium arabicum. The objective of the schools was to help the Dominicans liberate Christian captives in Islamic lands.

=== Summa de casibus poenitentiae ===
Raymond had written for confessors a book of cases, the Summa de casibus poenitentiae. More than simply a list of sins and suggested penances, it discussed pertinent doctrines and laws of the Church that pertained to the problem or case brought to the confessor, and is widely considered an authoritative work on the subject.

In 1229 Raymond was appointed theologian and penitentiary to the Cardinal Archbishop of Sabina, John of Abbeville, and was summoned to Rome in 1230 by Pope Gregory IX, who appointed him chaplain and grand penitentiary.

=== Gregorian Decretals ===
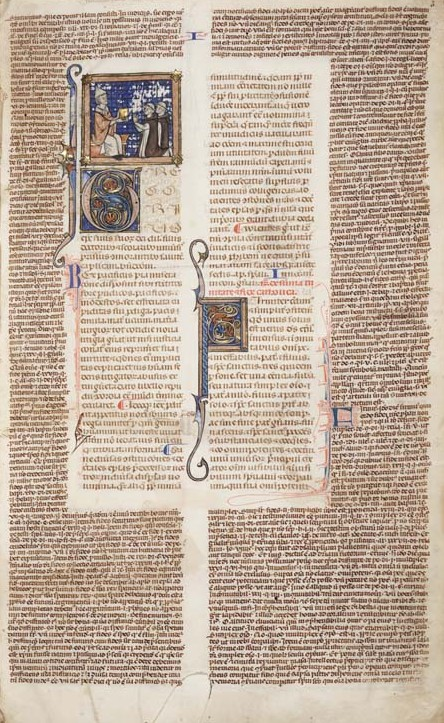
Decretals with Glossa

Knowing Raymond's reputation in the juridical sciences, Gregory IX asked him to help in the rearranging and codifying of canon law. Canon laws, which were previously found scattered in many publications, were to be organized into one set of documents.

Papal decretal letters had been changing the law over the course of the previous 100 years since the publication of the Decretum of Gratian. Being pleased with Raymond's efforts, the pope announced the new publication in a Bull directed to the doctors and students of Paris and Bologna in September 1234, commanding that the work of Raymond alone should be considered authoritative, and should alone be used in the schools. His collection of canon law, known as the Decretals of Gregory IX, became a standard for almost 700 years. Canon law was finally fully codified by 1917.

=== Most famous miracle ===
Raymond of Penyafort served as the confessor for King James I of Aragon. While on the island of Mallorca to initiate a campaign to help convert the Moors living there, the king brought his mistress with him. Raymond reproved the king and asked him repeatedly to dismiss his concubine. The king refused to do so. Finally, the saint told the king that he could remain with him no longer and made plans to leave for Barcelona. But the king forbade Raymond to leave the island, and threatened punishment to any ship captain who dared to take him.

Raymond and his Dominican companion went down to the seashore where Raymond took off his cappa (the long black cloak worn by Dominicans over the white tunic and scapular), and spread one end of it on the water while rigging the other end to his walking staff. Having thus formed a miniature mast, Raymond bid the other Dominican to hop on, but his companion, lacking the saint’s faith, refused to do so. Then Raymond bid him farewell, and with the sign of the cross he pushed away from the shore and sailed away on his cloak. Skirting around the very boats that had forbidden him passage, the saint was seen by scores of sailors who shouted in astonishment and urged him on. According to this legend, Raymond sailed the 160 miles to Barcelona in the space of six hours, where his landing was witnessed by a crowd of amazed spectators. In awe of this miracle, King James I mended his ways.

=== Later life ===
Having reached his 60th year, Raymond retired to a reclusive life in Barcelona. Within the year, however, Raymond was appointed to the position of Archbishop of Tarragona, the ecclesiastical capital of the Principality of Catalonia and the Crown of Aragon, but declined.

Raymond returned to Barcelona in 1236. Not long able to remain in seclusion, however, he was elected the Master of the Order of Preachers by the General Chapter of 1238. He immediately set out on foot to visit all the houses of friars and nuns of the Order. Even in the midst of this, he was able to draft a new set of Constitutions of the Order, in which he included a resignation clause for the Master. When it was adopted by the next General Chapter of 1240, he immediately took advantage of that option and resigned within two years.

Although not an inquisitor, as an advisor to James I of Aragon he was often consulted regarding questions of law regarding the practices of the Inquisition in the king's domains. "...[T]he lawyer's deep sense of justice and equity, combined with the worthy Dominican's sense of compassion, allowed him to steer clear of the excesses that were found elsewhere in the formative years of the inquisitions into heresy." Raymond approved of conjugal visits for those imprisoned so that the spouse should not be exposed to the risk of possible adultery.

=== Conversion of Jews and Muslims ===
Rejoicing to see himself again free of office, he applied himself with fresh vigor to the Christian ministry, especially working for the conversion of the Moors. To this end he encouraged Thomas Aquinas to write his work Against the Gentiles. He instituted the teaching of Arabic and Hebrew in several houses of the friars. He also founded priories in Murcia (then still ruled by Arabs) and in Tunis. Additionally he went to help establish the Church in the recently conquered island of Mallorca.

== Disputation of Barcelona ==
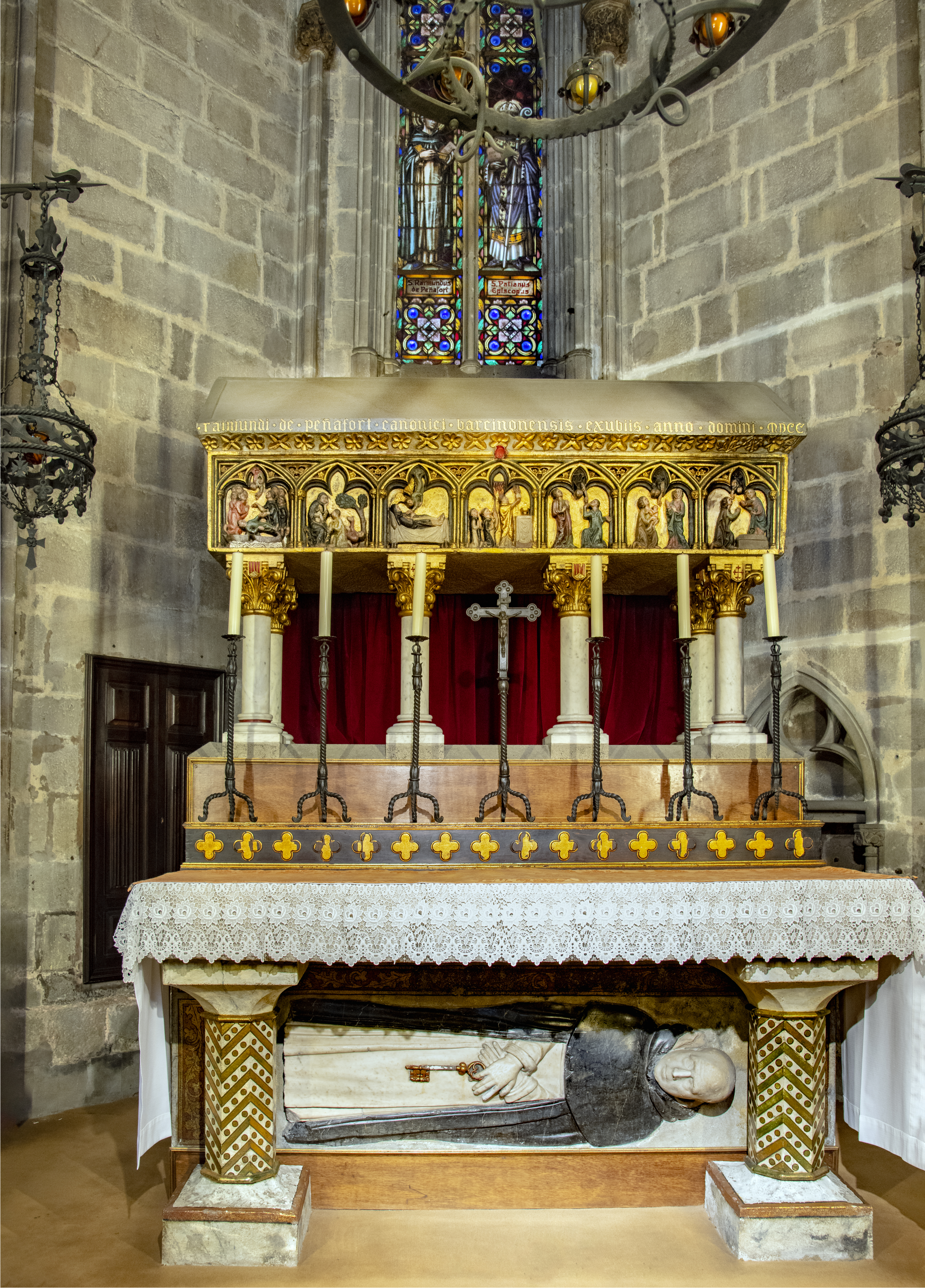
Tomb of St. Raymond in the Cathedral of Barcelona

He exercised great influence over King James of Aragon and succeeded in persuading him to order a public debate, concerning Judaism and Christianity, between Moshe ben Nahman, a rabbi in Girona, and Paulus Christiani, a baptized Jew of Montpellier who belonged to the Dominicans. In this debate, which took place in the royal palace and other venues at Barcelona from 20–31 July 1263, in the presence of the king and of many of the higher clergy, Raymond took an important part. He was at the head of the theologians present, and in agreement with the king gave the rabbi perfect freedom of speech. Raymond simply observed to Moses ben Nachman that he must not allow himself to blaspheme Christianity, to which Moses replied that he knew what the laws of propriety demanded. On the Jewish Sabbath following the close of the debate, the king, together with many preaching friars and other clergy, visited the synagogue.

Raymond died at the age of 100 in Barcelona in 1275 and was canonized by Pope Clement VIII in 1601. He was buried in the Cathedral of Santa Eulalia in Barcelona.

== Feast day ==
St. Raymond of Peñafort's feast day was inserted in the General Roman Calendar in 1671 for celebration on 23 January. In 1969 it was moved to 7 January, the day after that of his death. He is the patron saint of canon lawyers, specifically, and also of lawyers in general.

== Influence and legacy ==
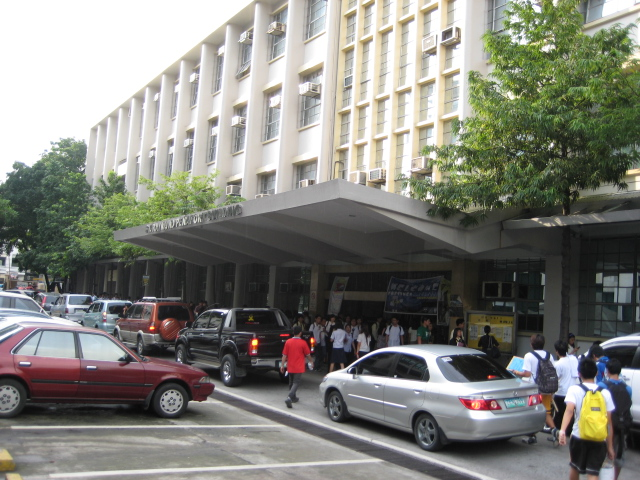
The St. Raymond Peñafort Building

The St. Raymond Peñafort Building at the University of Santo Tomas in Manila, which houses the College of Commerce and Business Administration and the Faculty of Arts and Letters, is named in his honor.

== See also ==
- Saint Raymond of Penyafort, patron saint archive

== General and cited references ==
Attribution

Catholic Church titles
Preceded by Jordan of Saxony	Master General of the Dominican Order; 1238–1240	Succeeded by John of Wildeshausen
