= Lucy Bailey =

British theatre director

Lucy Bailey is a British theatre director, known for productions such as Baby Doll at Britain's National Theatre and Titus Andronicus, The Guardian review said, 'There is no getting away from our complicity in the unfolding events as heads roll, blood spurts and hearts crack. Bailey completely understands the Globe space and uses it brilliantly.'

Bailey founded the Gogmagogs theatre-music group (1995–2006) and was artistic director and joint founder of the Print Room theatre in West London (2010–2012). She has worked extensively with Bunny Christie and other stage designers, including her husband William Dudley.

== Biography ==
Bailey was born in Butleigh, Somerset, England. She has stated that her favourite films include any by Pasolini. As a teenager, Bailey studied the flute but gave up music to concentrate on theatre. Bailey studied English at St Peter's College, Oxford. She and her husband, William Dudley, have two sons.

== Career ==
Bailey became interested in theatre when she worked as a telephonist at Glyndebourne at the age of 17. At age 20, Bailey wrote to Samuel Beckett requesting permission to stage his short story, Lessness. Beckett agreed to meet, and she showed him her design for a production. Although he said she had got it completely wrong, he gave her permission to stage it, which she did at The Oxford Playhouse in February 1982.

Bailey started her professional life as an assistant director at the Royal National Theatre, Glyndebourne Opera and the Royal Shakespeare Company. Bailey co-founded the Gogmagogs music theatre company in 1995, with Nell Catchpole and six other string players. Her return to straight theatre came when she was invited by Mark Rylance, then artistic director of the Globe Theatre, to direct there in the late 1990s, and her work there has included productions of Titus Andronicus and Macbeth. Bailey has also directed Shakespeare productions at the RSC in Stratford-upon-Avon, including The Taming of the Shrew, A Winter's Tale and Julius Caesar, with Greg Hicks in the title role.

== Artistic Director ==
Lucy Bailey co-founded the 80-seat London venue Print Room, which opened on 10 November 2010, and along with the producer Anda Winters was artistic director there until 2012. At the Print Room, Bailey directed productions such as Fabrication by Pier Paolo Pasolini, Alan Ayckbourn’s Snake in the Grass, Tennessee Williams’ Kingdom of Earth and Chekhov’s Uncle Vanya with Iain Glen in the title role. Bailey and her producer renovated a 1950s warehouse into the theatre, situated just off Westbourne Grove, aiming to show challenging or unknown plays as well as classics. Bailey and Winters say that they first conceived the Print Room over a large glass of wine at the National Theatre.

== Selected work ==
- 2024 - Murder on the Orient Express UK Tour
- 2023 - And Then There Were None Uk Tour
- 2018 - Switzerland at Ustinov Studio, Bath, and Ambassadors Theatre, London
- 2017-2025 - Witness for the Prosecution at County Hall, London
- 2016 - Comus Sam Wanamaker Playhouse at Shakespeare's Globe
- 2016 - Kenny Morgan (Arcola Theatre)
- 2014 - Dial M for Murder (UK wide Tour)
- 2014 - Titus Andronicus (revival) (Shakespeare's Globe)
- 2013 - King Lear with David Haig (Theatre Royal Bath)
- 2014 - Fortune's Fool (The Old Vic)
- 2013 - The Winter's Tale (Royal Shakespeare Company)
- 2012 - The Taming of the Shrew (Royal Shakespeare Company)
- 2011 - The Beggar’s Opera (Regent’s Park Open Air Theatre)
- 2010 - Macbeth (Shakespeare's Globe)
- 2009 - Julius Caesar (Royal Shakespeare Company)
- 2009 - Private Lives (Hampstead Theatre)
- 2009 - Dial M for Murder (West Yorkshire Playhouse)
- 2008 - Timon of Athens (Shakespeare's Globe)
- 2007 - Glass Eels (Nell Leyshon) (Hampstead Theatre)
- 2007 - Don't Look Now (stage adaptation) Lyceum Theatre (Sheffield)
- 2006 - Titus Andronicus (Shakespeare's Globe)
- 2004 -2005 - The Postman Always Rings Twice (Playhouse/West End) with Val Kilmer
- 2005/7 - Comfort Me with Apples (Hampstead Theatre)
- 2004 - The Night Season Royal National Theatre by Rebecca Lenkiewicz
- 2001 - Troy Town (Battersea Arts Centre - BAC)
- 1999-2000 - Baby Doll (Tennessee Williams) National Theatre/Albery Theatre West End
- 1997 - The Maid's Tragedy (Beaumont and Fletcher) (Shakespeare's Globe)

== Productions as Artistic Director, Print Rooms ==
- 2010 - Fabrication (Affabulazione) (Pasolini)
- 2011 - Kingdom of the Earth (Tennessee Williams)
- 2011 - Snake in the Grass (Alan Ayckbourn)
- 2012 - Uncle Vanya (Anton Chekhov) with Iain Glen

== Opera ==
- 1996 - Gudrun Fier Sang (Copenhagen dry dock)
- 1994 - Jenufa, Janáček, (English National Opera)
- 1994 - Cheryoumushki 1958 (Lyric Hammersmith)
- 1994 - Noye's Fludde, Benjamin Britten, (Aldeburgh Festival)
- 1993 - Il Barbiere di Siviglia (Wexford Opera Festival)
- 1992 - Mary of Egypt (Aldeburgh Festival)
- 1992 - Adaptation of Pasolini’s Teorema (Maggio Musicale Florence/Munich Biennale/Queen Elizabeth Hall).
- 1990 - Triptych, Alexander Goehr (Aldeburgh Festival)
- 1989 - Mitridate (Wexford Opera Festival)
