= The Years Between =

The Year(s) Between may refer to:

- The Years Between (play), a play by Daphne du Maurier
- The Years Between (film), a 1946 British film based on the play
- The Year Between, an independent 2023 American comedy film starring, written, and directed by Alex Heller
