= Peter Foy =

British stage flying effects supervisor (1925–2005)

- Born: Peter Stuart Foy; June 11, 1925; London, England
- Died: February 17, 2005 (aged 79); Las Vegas, Nevada, U.S.
- Known for: Stagecraft
- Spouse: Barbara Foy
- Awards: United States Institute for Theatre Technology 1990 International Safety Award
- Website: http://www.flybyfoy.com

Peter Foy (11 June 1925 – 17 February 2005) was the stage flying effects specialist who founded "Flying by Foy", most widely known for its work flying actors in the play Peter Pan.

Born in London, England, he began in show business as a child actor, and in one of his roles (as a Sea Witch in Where the Rainbow Ends) was called upon to fly. After serving in the Royal Air Force as a Navigator and Entertainment Officer, he began working for the British company that had flown him, Kirby's Flying Ballets, and sailed to New York in 1950 to stage the flying sequences for Peter Pan starring Jean Arthur. He flew many of her successors in the role, including Mary Martin, Sandy Duncan, and Cathy Rigby.

Other productions for which he created flying sequences included I Love Lucy, Men into Space, The Garry Moore Show, Hanna Barbera's Jack and the Beanstalk with Gene Kelly and The Flying Nun on television; Fantastic Voyage, Funny Girl, Willy Wonka & the Chocolate Factory, Hair and The Wiz in movies; It's a Bird...It's a Plane...It's Superman, Jerome Robbins' Broadway, The Who's Tommy, Kiss of the Spider Woman, Angels in America, The Lion King, Disney's Aida, and Dracula, the Musical on Broadway; and touring productions of the Ice Capades.

An innovator, Foy constantly tinkered with improvements and invented new systems of staged flight for both greater freedom of movement and greater safety.

Jean Arthur's Peter Pan was flown on a Kirby pendulum system with a compound drum, the standard method of flying actors for more than 100 years. But Foy became increasingly dissatisfied with the performance of the flying equipment, which he felt limited stage flight to little more than "nervous stunts or a series of static tableaus". He wanted to create flying sequences that looked more natural and soon began to develop new equipment that would allow actors' movements to be more easily synchronized with music and seamlessly integrated into the action of the play.

By the time he returned to New York, four years later, to fly Mary Martin in the new musical version of Peter Pan, Foy had invented a new system, the "Inter-Related Pendulum", which utilized two suspension points, each controlled by a separate operator. The Inter-Related Pendulum made possible spectacular, highly controlled, free flight, but required operators with a high degree of skill and precision, as the performer's weight passes from one suspension point to the other. The system also required a minimum 40 feet of grid height to produce a natural-looking, effective pendulum swing.

He founded Flying by Foy in 1957; in the 1960s he branched out from Broadway to Las Vegas shows.

Throughout his lifetime, Foy applied his mechanical ingenuity to the challenge of safely flying performers in a variety of different and often difficult circumstances. He solved the problem of flying actors in low height situations (such as little theatres and tent shows) with his invention of the Floating Pulley in 1958. While this development was highly effective, the device was often visible to the audience. His determination to preserve the "magic" of theatrical flight led to his introduction of the "Track-On-Track" system in 1962-63, which allows two operators to independently control the performer's lift and travel in flight.

Foy's "Multi-Point Balance Harness", developed for the swimming sequences in the 1966 film Fantastic Voyage, featured adjustable points of attachment, enabling the actors to maintain any position in flight.

Foy holds patents, in both the United States and the United Kingdom, for a number of flying devices and flying systems, including an advanced form of Track-On-Track developed specifically for the Ice Capades, which he called the "Inter-Reacting Compensator". This system was utilized in the first fully motorized, integrated touring truss flying system, built for the 1977 Ice Capades' "Flying Ballet".

He died in Las Vegas, Nevada.

At the time of his death, "Flying by Foy" was producing the flight effects for two Broadway-bound shows: Spamalot and Chitty Chitty Bang Bang.

Recent Broadway projects involving "Flying by Foy" include: Mary Poppins, Billy Elliot the Musical, Equus, You're Welcome America - A Final Night with George W Bush, American Idiot, and Priscilla Queen of the Desert.
