= Anna Appleby =

English composer (born 1993)

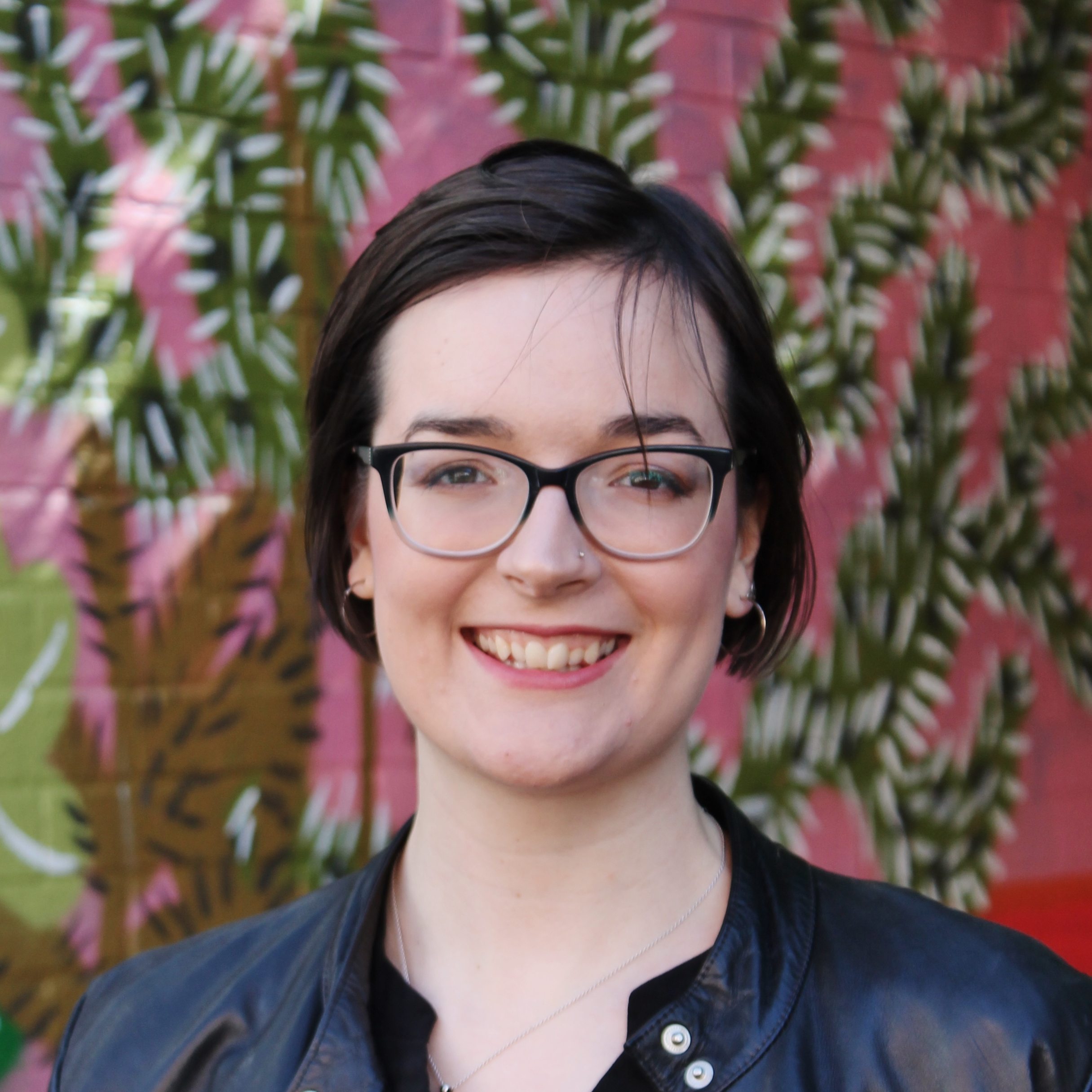
- Born: 1993 (age 32–33)
- Era: Contemporary

Anna Appleby (born 1993, Newcastle Upon Tyne) is an English composer and songwriter of contemporary classical and experimental pop music, based in Manchester, UK. Her pop music is released under her moniker Norrisette. She is also a published short story author.

Appleby composed an opera, Drought, for the BBC Philharmonic and singers from the Royal Northern College of Music, with words by poet Niall Campbell, which was premiered in October 2022 and broadcast on BBC Radio 3 in August 2023.

Appleby was music fellow with the Rambert Dance Company in 2016/17. Appleby co-composed a collaborative youth opera for Glyndebourne which won 'Best Opera' at the YAM Awards in 2023. She has also composed music for Streetwise Opera, a company who work with people who have experienced homelessness.

She appeared on BBC Breakfast in 2018 to discuss gender equality in classical music and songwriting. She also appeared on BBC Radio 4 Front Row to discuss the pop-classical experimental album LUX by Rosalía in 2025.

Appleby was appointed a professor of composition at the Royal Northern College of Music in 2025.
