= The Glass Blowers =

The Glass Blowers may refer to:

- The Glass-Blowers, a 1963 novel by Daphne du Maurier.
- The Glass Blowers (operetta), an operetta by John Philip Sousa and Leonard Liebling; created in 1908 and premiered in 1913

== See also ==
- Glassblowing
