= Not After Midnight, and Other Stories =

1971 story collection by Daphne du Maurier

Not After Midnight, and other stories
- First UK edition
- Author: Daphne Du Maurier
- Cover artist: Flavia Tower
- Language: English
- Publisher: Victor Gollancz (UK); Doubleday (US)
- Publication date: 1971
- Media type: Print
- Pages: 285
- ISBN: 0-575-00765-6

Not After Midnight, and other stories is a 1971 collection of five long stories by Daphne du Maurier. It was first published in Britain by Gollancz (with a cover by du Maurier's daughter Flavia Tower), and in America by Doubleday under the title Don't Look Now. In 1973 it was re-published in the UK by Penguin as Don't Look Now, and Other Stories.

== Plots ==
=== "Don't Look Now" ===
John and his grief-stricken wife Laura take a holiday in Venice following the death of their daughter, Christine, from meningitis; their son, Johnnie, attends a preparatory school in England. They encounter middle-aged identical twin sisters, one of whom is blind but has psychic abilities. During a night out, John hears a cry and sees what appears to be a small girl wearing a pixie-hood running along an alley and leaping across some moored canal boats before disappearing into a nearby house, apparently intent on escaping from unseen danger. The sisters tell Laura that John unwittingly has the gift of second sight, and that Christine is trying to warn them that they are in danger if they remain in Venice. They learn that the city has been plagued by a series of recent murders.

Johnnie's headmaster telegraphs the couple's hotel to inform them that their son has been taken ill. Laura leaves to fly back to England immediately, but long after her plane should have departed John unexpectedly sees her on a vaporetto (water bus) with the sisters, apparently heading back to the hotel in a distressed state. John searches for hours but is unable to locate his wife, and he eventually reports her disappearance to the police. Later that evening, John decides to call his son's school and is astounded to learn that Laura is in fact in England after all. He makes his way to the police station to apologise. He meets the sisters at the police station and escorts them back to their pension, where the psychic sister falls into a trance.

John leaves hurriedly and, disoriented, stumbles upon the alley from the previous evening. Once again, he catches sight of the little pixie-hooded figure, but this time sees a man in pursuit. Attempting to protect the figure from a presumed murderer, he follows her to a small room into which she has retreated and bolts the door from the inside. As her pixie-hood drops to the floor, the "child" is revealed to be a middle-aged female dwarf. Police bang on the door. Grinning, the dwarf pulls a knife from her sleeve and throws it at John, piercing his throat. As he slumps to the floor, John has a vision of the vaporetto and realises it is a premonition of the scene in a few days' time when Laura and the sisters will return for his funeral.

=== "Not After Midnight" ===
Timothy Grey, a preparatory school headmaster, takes a holiday to the Greek island of Crete with the intent of finding some solitude in which to paint. On arrival at his hotel, he asks to move his accommodation to a better chalet, near the water's edge, which the hotel management agrees to with some reluctance. The reason becomes clear when he discovers that the chalet's previous occupant had drowned while swimming at night. Also staying at the hotel is Stoll, a drunken and obnoxious American, and his silent and apparently deaf wife. They spend every day out in a small boat, ostensibly fishing.

Grey finds a card in his chalet left by the previous occupant reading, “Not after midnight” and the number 38, which he realises is the number of Stoll's chalet. One morning, Grey follows the couple and discovers that their days are being spent collecting ancient artefacts from a local shipwreck, with Mrs Stoll diving and supplying the finds to her husband on the beach. Grey is spotted, and that evening Stoll offers a gift, presumably to keep him quiet. His wife invites him to visit their chalet, but “not after midnight”. Grey does not go, and late that night he is visited by a snorkeller who leaves a wrapped gift on his veranda. It is a jar or rhyton, shaped into the form of a head resembling Stoll, with dancing satyrs above. Grey passes an exhausting night, having bizarre dreams of insidious and sweet pleasure with the boys from his school.

In the morning, Grey resolves to return the unwanted gift, but finds that the Stolls have departed. He drinks a barley-tasting concoction that Stoll had prepared and left behind. Determined to find out more about the Stolls’ activities, he hires a boat and – when exactly over the wreck – looks into the depths to see Stoll's body, drifting in the current, tied to an anchor. In a panic Grey throws the jar into the sea, but realises that he is too late, that the jar's head is becoming his own likeness, and that he too will soon become another victim of the smiling god Dionysus.

=== "A Border-Line Case" ===
Shelagh Money, a 19-year-old aspiring actress who goes by the stage name of Jennifer Blair, is looking forward to her first big theatre role, playing Viola/Cesaro in Twelfth Night. However, Shelagh may miss the opportunity as she feels obliged to stay with her seriously ill father. As they look through an old photograph album, Shelagh's father reminisces about a former friend, Commander Nick Barry, who was best man at his wedding and who appears in a photograph with the bride and groom. He regrets that he and Nick were never reconciled after the time when, as Nick's superior in the Royal Navy, he felt unable to recommend him for promotion. Suddenly and quite unexpectedly, Shelagh's father stares at her with a look of horror and disbelief on his face; he collapses and dies.

Feeling that she should pass on her father's last wish of reconciliation, Shelagh travels to Ireland in search of Nick, checking into a hotel. The locals are reluctant to talk, but she discovers that Nick lives a reclusive life on a small island. When Shelagh attempts to investigate further, she is kidnapped and taken to the island as Nick's involuntary 'guest'. She is shocked to see that he keeps on his desk a framed copy of her father's wedding photograph, which had been doctored to swap around the heads of the groom and the best man.

Nick – who is now an IRA commander – begins questioning Shelagh. Acting on impulse, she tells him that she is a journalist and gives her stage name. Nick tells her that the photograph is of his own wedding, and that his wife died shortly afterwards. Shelagh finds herself strongly attracted to Nick. When he takes her to view a bombing raid on targets just north of the border, they have passionate sex in the back of a grocer's van. Nick admits that the photograph is indeed a fake: a practical joke that the new bride took rather badly at the time. He got his own back by getting her drunk while her husband was away, and having what he calls 'a rough-and-tumble on the sofa'. Although Shelagh disapproves of his youthful indiscretion, she tells Nick she loves him and wants to be together.

Shelagh is taken back not to the island but to her hotel, and Nick departs. He makes no further contact and, dejected, she has no option but to return to England. On the opening night of her play, Shelagh is ready to go on as Viola/Cesaro when she receives a package. It is a letter from Nick and a photograph that she initially takes to be of herself in the role of Cesaro, but is in fact of Nick in the same role when he was a boy. Nick explains that she had reminded him of somebody - and has since realised that that person was himself. Shelagh at last understands her presumed father's dying look of horror and disbelief; with his last breath he had realised the truth.

=== "The Way of the Cross" ===
A disparate party from the middle-class village of Little Bletford take a sightseeing cruise to Middle East, led by their local vicar. All are in their own individual ways unsatisfied with their lives and their relationships. When their vicar falls ill, just before a planned 24-hour excursion ashore to Jerusalem, his place is taken by the inexperienced Reverend Babcock, a man more used to mixing with the youth of his own slum parish in Huddersfield. On the first night of the cruise, Robin, a precocious nine-year-old and grandson of one of the couples, suggests a walk to the Garden of Gethsemane.

In the dark, among the bushes and trees, two people overhear things about themselves that force them to re-evaluate their lives. The next day, several of the party experience mishaps and personal humiliations, and by the end of the excursion all apart from Robin have met the fate that they most dread. In dealing with the disasters the whole group learn a great deal about themselves and their loved ones, and they return happier people.

=== "The Breakthrough" ===
Stephen Saunders is sent to an isolated laboratory on the salt marshes of the East Coast to help out with a secret project. He is told that the laboratory is in need of an electrical engineer, but is given no other details. On arrival, Stephen discovers that he is expected to help operate the computer for an experiment to trap a human's vital spark, or psychic energy, at the point of death and prevent it from going to waste. The test subject is Ken, an affable young assistant who is dying of leukaemia.

As Ken lies on the point of death he is put under hypnosis along with Niki, a backward child whom the scientists have found to be susceptible. Niki is asked to 'stay with Ken' as his life ebbs away, and initially it seems that the experiment has been a success, with the instruments showing that Ken's energy has been captured. But after the point of death Niki, still under hypnosis, reports that Ken is asking the experimenters to let him go, and they realise that they may have captured more of Ken than his psychic energy. Horrified, they disconnect the apparatus and release the energy.

== Background ==
"The Breakthrough" is the earliest story in the collection, written in 1964 in response to a request from Kingsley Amis who was hoping to edit a collection of science-fiction stories, a collection which never ultimately appeared. It was written before The House on the Strand, for which it was in some ways a rehearsal.

"A Borderline Case" is the only story rooted in personal experience. In 1932, du Maurier had met and been attracted to the British officer Eric Dorman-Smith, who in the post-war years became involved with the IRA. She had tried to locate him while holidaying in Ireland, but without success. In 1968, however, she contacted him by letter and he responded with a poem. After his death in 1969, du Maurier felt able to incorporate some of these incidents into her story; the details, she stressed, were "purely imaginary".

== Critical reception ==
Reviewing the book under its American title Don't Look Now, Margaret Millar of The New York Times was lukewarm. While acknowledging du Maurier's popularity, she felt the book to be "a collection of five uneasy pieces" in which "the reader is given an intriguing situation, a series of neatly planted clues and a generous number of plot twists".

Du Maurier's biographer Margaret Forster considered "Not After Midnight" to be a 'not very successful story', demonstrating how the author's liking for intricate plot could lead her into complications which made her writing tortuous. She thought however that "The Way of the Cross" worked well, and noted that at one stage du Maurier considered turning it into a novel but was worried that she would not be able to maintain the tension. "The Breakthrough" she found to be skilfully worked, with an atmosphere of chilling menace which du Maurier herself had greatly liked.

== Adaptations ==
The story "Don't Look Now" has been adapted in several media: a 1973 film directed by Nicolas Roeg; twice for BBC Radio 4: first in 2001 by Ronald Frame as part of the Classic Serial series, and again in 2024 by Katie Hims; and a 2007 stage play by Nell Leyshon.
