= The King's General =

1946 novel by Daphne du Maurier

- First US edition
- Author: Daphne du Maurier
- Language: English
- Genre: Gothic, Historical romance
- Publisher: Gollancz (UK); Doubleday (US)
- Publication date: 1946
- Publication place: UK
- Pages: 298

The King's General is a Gothic novel, published in 1946, by English author and playwright Daphne du Maurier. The setting is the English Civil War (1642–1651).

== Background ==
It was the first novel du Maurier wrote while living at Menabilly, the setting for an earlier novel Rebecca, where it is called 'Manderley'. The writing of the novel was accompanied by prolific research, in which du Maurier was assisted by Oenone Rashleigh, whose family owned Menabilly, and historian A. L. Rowse, to ensure the historical accuracy of her presentation of the Devon/Cornwall setting at the time of the Civil War. The historical precision and accuracy made it popular among local people, but the novel's reviews did not praise this aspect, which disappointed du Maurier. The inspiration for the novel came from a discovery by William Rashleigh of a skeleton when involved in renovation work on the house. The skeleton was thought to belong to a Cavalier of the Civil War because of its clothing.

== Plot ==
The novel is set at the time of the English Civil War. A middle-aged Honor Harris narrates the story of her youth, from the age of ten, when living with her brother Robin. The narrative begins when Kit, Honor's oldest brother, brings home his new bride, Gartred. After only three years, Kit dies of smallpox and Gartred moves away.

At age eighteen, Honor meets Richard Grenville, Gartred's brother. They fall in love and, despite a former arrangement for Honor to marry another, they decide to be married. Honor is injured and loses the use of her legs in a riding accident, when out with Richard and Gartred. Subsequently, Honor refuses to marry – or even see – Richard.

By the time the Civil War breaks out, fifteen years have passed; Honor has grown in independence, moving about on an early model of a wheelchair, and Richard has had three children: Joe, born illegitimately from an affair with a dairymaid; Dick, from a failed marriage; and Dick's sister Elizabeth, who lives with her mother and is not really part of the novel's story. As is clearly suggested, the bastard Joe — lively and quick witted — is his father's favorite son, preferred over the legitimate Dick.

Following some violence nearby, Honor moves to Menabilly, the home of her sister and brother-in-law, where she again meets Richard, who has been posted to Plymouth as a leader of the King's army in the west of England.

During the war, Richard is wounded, and in a reversal of roles, Honor tends to him in his weakness. In the last part of the fighting, Joe is captured and executed by the Parliamentarians. Richard's deep grief at the loss of his beloved bastard son increases the bitterness and jealousy felt by the neglected Dick.

The Parliamentarians take Cornwall, and Richard flees the country but takes part in a Royalist rebellion some years later. He is betrayed: it is suggested that the betrayer is his son Dick. After the revolt fails, an escape plan is made to remove Richard and Dick to safety by crossing to Holland with Richard's daughter (Dick's sister) on board the boat. Rumours of their escape which are told to Honor suggest that only Richard is able to escape: this returns the reader to the inspiration for Du Maurier's tale – the skeleton discovered in the excavations of Menabilly.

== Literary criticism ==
=== Genre ===
The King's General has been classed as a gothic novel because of the prominence of archetypal gothic tropes. Included in these tropes is the motif of the 'distorted body', a trope the author deflects by attributing it to the protagonist and forcing the reader to experience the body through the view of the narrator.

Another trope of gothic fiction employed by du Maurier is that of the secret room. Ever in the author's mind is a secret room in Menabilly in which a Cavalier's skeleton was found. The secret passage to the summer house is also a frequent motif, leading to the secret room which Honor discovers and in which local Royalists are hiding silver plate to support the King's cause, a fact she conceals when Menabilly is occupied by Parliamentarian forces.

For the most part, du Maurier opts for using language contemporary to the time of writing. However, this contrast with the extensive and careful historical research, coupled with relatively modern attitudes and manners which are to be found in all her historical novels, can be uncomfortable: as one critic in The Times Literary Supplement claimed, "Though we readily accept that the public events [of The King's General] took place during the Civil War, it is impossible ever to believe the people lived in this period." Critics like Horner and Zlosnik claim that rather than creating a conflict, this is actually an interplay, another way in which Du Maurier undermines the tropes of the gothic novel through its combination with the historical romance genre.

The historical romance classification is also eluded, because despite Honor's early reference and the reader's expectation that the protagonist will marry and have children, Honor never mothers Richard's children, but rather acts as a substitute mother for his son Dick while he is rejected by his father.

=== Homosexuality ===
Some critics, including Horner and Zlosnik, suggest that Dick may be homosexual and that this is an aspect of his father's rejection of him throughout the novel. Characters in the novel portrayed as dominantly masculine, including Richard, suggest connections between being foreign and homosexual. Neither of these prejudices of Richard's is endorsed by Honor or the novel.

=== Historical and biographical ===
The King's General was written shortly after the end of the Second World War, and reflects the influence of the war on family and romance. Honor's incapacity in the novel – represented by the nature of her crippling injuries which leave her housebound – has been suggested to represent an ambiguous message of the limited freedom for women in wartime. However this ignores the extended roles actually played by women during World War 2 in factories, on farms and taking over the roles usually performed by men at the time.

The novel is dedicated to du Maurier's husband, Sir Frederick Browning, 'also a general but, I trust, a more discreet one', suggesting some biographical connection between "Boy" Browning and Richard. From this reading, Du Maurier is Honor, developing her own independence in the restrictions of her circumstances while her husband was at war.

== Adaptations ==
The novel was adapted as a radio drama for BBC Radio 4, first broadcast in 1992. It was adapted by Micheline Wandor and directed by Cherry Cookson. Actors included Cathryn Harrison as Honor, Roger Allam as Richard, Carolyn Pickles and Philip Sully.

In 2014 Nina Companeez released a TV movie about Daphne du Maurier's novel called "Le général du roi". The plot is transposed to France, during the War in the Vendée.
