= Nell Leyshon =

British writer

Nell Leyshon is a British novelist and award-winning dramatist. She serves on the Advisory Board of the Alpine Fellowship and as the Deputy Chair of Shakespeare's Globe Theatre. She previously served on the Management Committee for the Society of Authors. She is best known for her novel The Colour of Milk, which was translated into multiple languages and has gained international recognition, winning the Prix Interallié in France where it was also shortlisted for the Prix Femina, and voted the book of the year in Spain.

== Life ==
Leyshon was born in Somerset, Glastonbury, where she grew up and attended art college before moving to London.

She worked as a producer in TV commercials, working alongside directors such as Ridley and Tony Scott. She attended the University of Southampton before publishing her first novel, Black Dirt.

Leyshon's support for marginalized communities is shown through her work. She has written many dramas for BBC Radio 3 and 4, including the play Glass Eels, and a special Woman's Hour series on teenage mental health. In 2014, Leyshon wrote her first libretto, The River Keeper, for Streetwise Opera, a charity that helps homeless people rebuild their lives and identities.

In 2018, she founded the Outsiders Project, a company giving voice to the unheard and marginalised members of the community of Boscombe through creative writing and photography workshops. Leyshon taught creative writing and performance, focusing on developing self-esteem and shaping the writer's unique artistic voice.

She was elected a Fellow of the Royal Society of Literature in 2018.

== Literary work ==
=== Prose ===
In May 2004, Leyshon's first novel, Black Dirt, was published by Picador and was long-listed for the Orange Prize and runner up for the Commonwealth Prize.

In May 2012, Leyshon's novel The Colour of Milk was published by Penguin.

=== Radio and theatre ===
Leyshon's first radio play, Milk, won the Richard Imison Award. Her second drama War Bride was runner up for the Meyer Whitworth Award.

In 2005, Leyshon's play Comfort me with Apples won an Evening Standard Theatre Award for most promising playwright, was nominated for a Laurence Olivier Award and was shortlisted for Susan Smith Blackburn Award.

Leyshon adapted Daphne du Maurier's Don't Look Now for the Lyceum, Sheffield; it later transferred to the Lyric, Hammersmith. In 2010, her play Bedlam was the first play written by a woman to be performed at the Globe Theatre.

Leyshon has also written plays for young people for National Theatre Connections: The Beauty Manifesto and Terra, which was a dance theatre piece with choreography by Anthony Missem. She also wrote for Royal Theatre Plymouth, and wrote the play The Word for RADA Elders group.

Subsequent radio plays include Glass Eels, Soldier Boy, Writing The Century and Jess, a Woman's Hour drama about child mental health for Children in Need.

== The Outsiders Project ==
The Outsiders Project works with members of the community of Boscombe. The work is shown locally, then shared with the wider world. Leyshon's vision was to show that people sidelined from society can write, perform and create work at the highest level.

The Outsiders Project has produced three works for the stage: Vodka Hunters, Secret Voices and The Truth About Men, all three as part of the Bournemouth Emerging Arts Fringe Festival in 2018 and 2019.

During the 2020 COVID-19 pandemic, the organization launched the Tattoo Project, an online initiative to gather, tell stories and find new outsider artists.

== Teaching ==
Leyshon has been teaching for 27 years, and spent the last 17 years specialising in outsider voices. She has worked extensively with the recovery community in prisons and mental health settings. She has also worked with the Romani community, and has led many partnership courses for Arvon Foundation.

She started a series of Lockdown Workshops, to share her approach to writing during the lockdown.

== Selected work ==
=== Novels ===
- Black Dirt (Picador, 2004)
- Devotion (Picador, 2008)
- The Colour of Milk (Penguin, 2012)
- Memoirs of a Dipper (Penguin, 2015)

=== Radio dramas ===
- The Farm (2002) (BBC Radio 4)
- Milk (2002) (BBC Radio 4)
- Glass Eels (2003) (BBC Radio 4)
- The Home Field (2003) (BBC Radio 3)
- The House in the Trees (2004) (BBC Radio 4)
- Soldier Boy (2005) (BBC Radio 4)
- Black Dirt (BBC Radio 3)
- War Bride (2008) (BBC Radio 4)
- Sons (2009) (BBC Radio 4)
- The Iron Curtain (2011) (BBC Radio 4, Woman's Hour)
- The Colour of Milk (2013) (BBC Radio 4)
- Jess's Story, Children in need, BBC Radio 4
- Three Letters (BBC Radio 3)

=== Theatre ===
- The Farm
- Milk
- Comfort me with Apples, Hampstead Theatre
- Don't Look Now (adapted from the story by Daphne du Maurier), Lyric Theatre (Hammersmith)
- The Beauty Manifesto
- The River Keeper Streetwise Opera
- Glass Eels
- Bedlam, Shakespeare's Globe
- Winter, Theatre Newfoundland and Labrador
- The Word, RADA Elders group
- Barro, Gran Teatro Nacional Peru
- Terra, National Theatre Connections
- Three Letters, Royal Shakespeare Company

== Personal life ==
Leyshon lives in Dorset with her partner Dominic. She has two sons.
