= Glass Eels =

2003 play by Nell Leyshon

Glass Eels is a play written by Nell Leyshon, broadcast on BBC Radio 4 in July 2003. The play has also been performed on stage at the Hampstead Theatre, it is the second part of a planned quartet of Somerset plays covering the four seasons the first being the award-winning Comfort Me with Apples.

The play is set on the Somerset Levels one August, probably on the River Parrett. While it explores a young girl's sexual awakening, and her acceptance of past loss, it also concerns eel fishing and a dying rural way of life.
