= Mary Anne Clarke =

English courtesan and diarist (1776–1852)

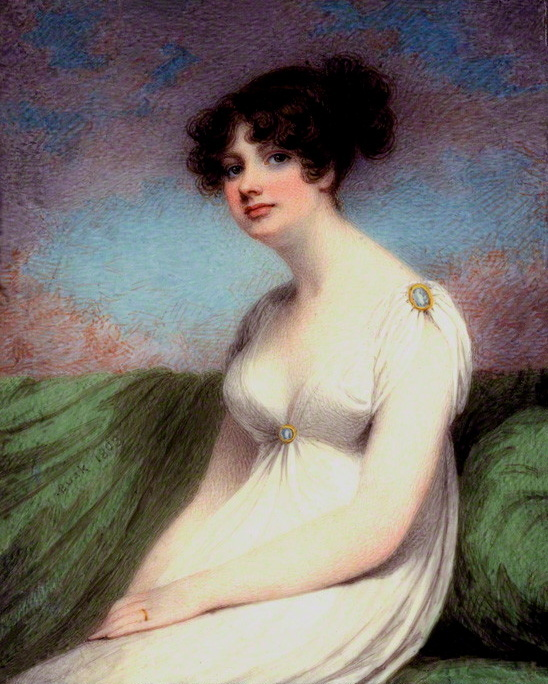
- Portrait by Adam Buck, 1803
- Born: Mary Anne Thompson; 3 April 1776; London, England
- Died: 21 June 1852 (aged 76); Boulogne-sur-Mer, Pas-de-Calais
- Occupations: Courtesan; Author
- Known for: Mistress of Frederick, Duke of York
- Spouse(s): Joseph Clarke (m. 1792)
- Children: 4

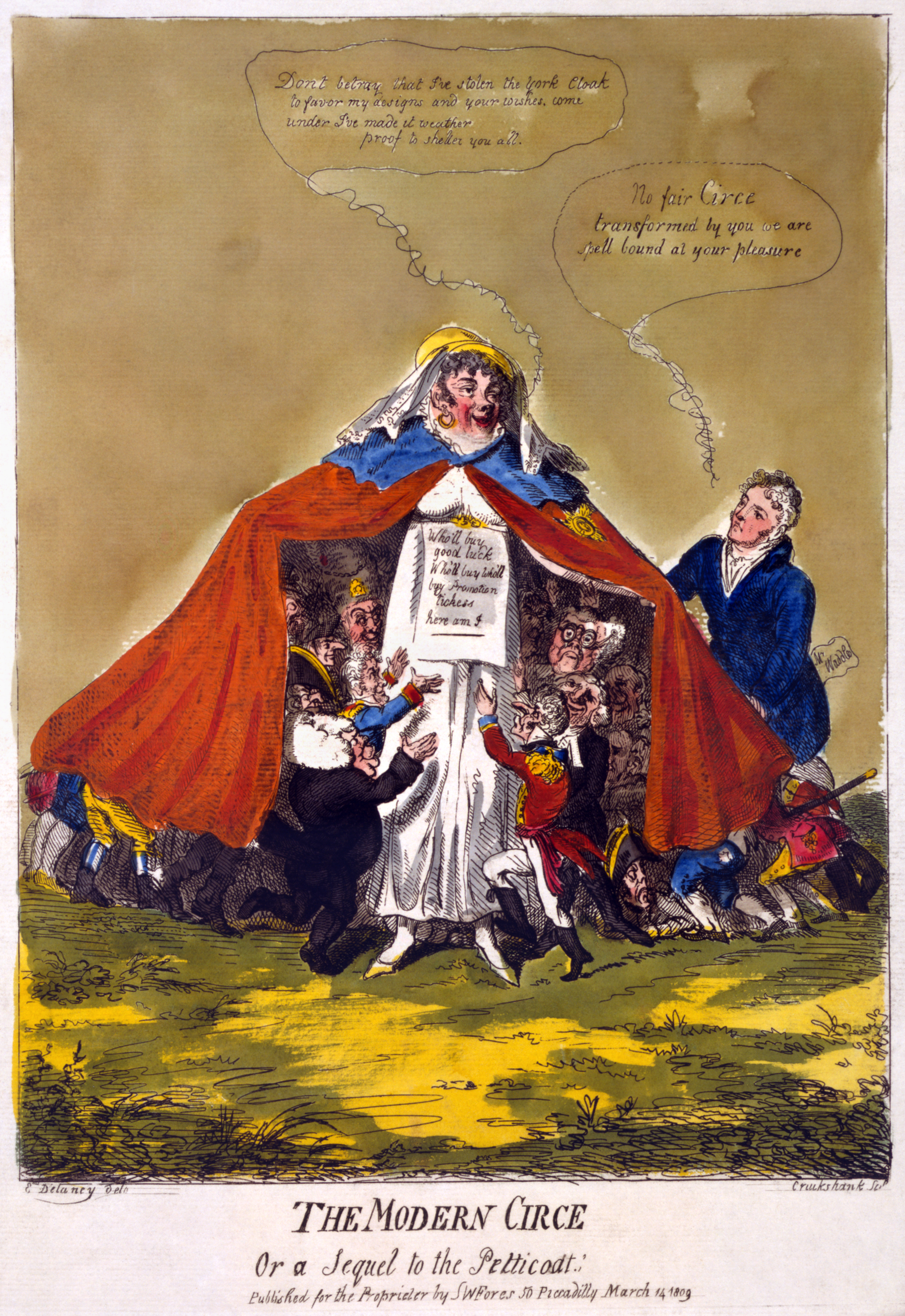
"The modern Circe or a sequel to the petticoat", caricature of Mary Anne Clarke by Isaac Cruikshank, 15 March 1809. Her lover Frederick, Duke of York resigned from his post at the head of the British Army ten days after the caricature's publication.

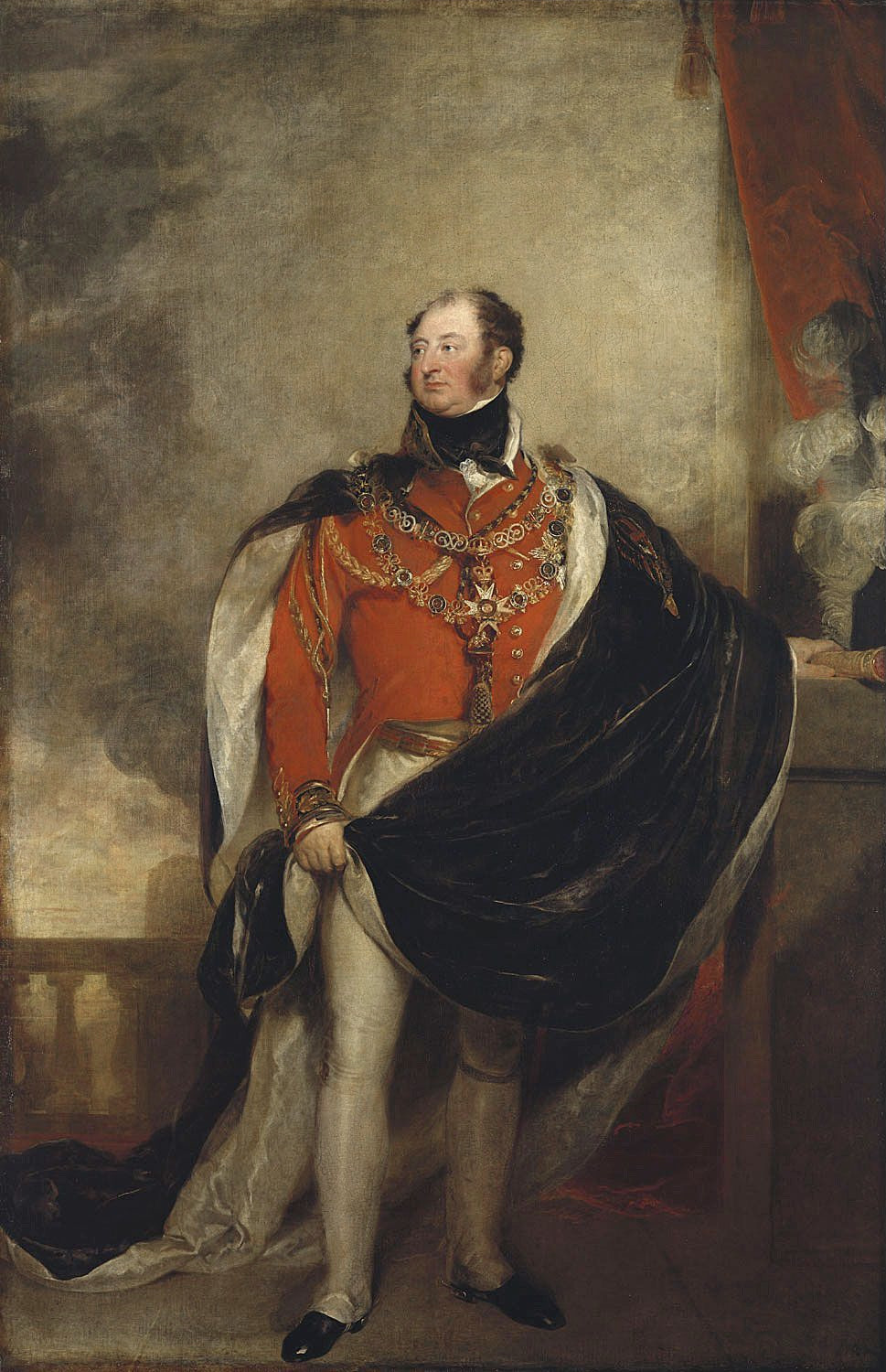
Portrait of the Duke of York by Thomas Lawrence, 1816.

Mary Anne Clarke (born Mary Anne Thompson; 3 April 1776 – 21 June 1852) was the mistress of Prince Frederick, Duke of York and Albany. Their relationship began in 1803, while he was Commander-in-Chief of the army. Later in 1809, she wrote her memoirs which were published. She was the subject of a portrait by Adam Buck, and a caricature by Isaac Cruikshank; ten days after the latter's publication, the Duke resigned from his post as Commander of the British Army. In 1811, she commissioned Irish sculptor Lawrence Gahagan to sculpt a marble bust of her; this is now housed in the National Portrait Gallery, London.

Through her daughter Ellen, who married Louis-Mathurin Busson du Maurier, Clarke was a great-great-grandmother of author Daphne du Maurier, who wrote the novel Mary Anne about her life.

== Life as a courtesan ==
Mary Anne Thompson was born on 3 April 1776 in London, the daughter of a humble tradesman. Attractive and intelligent, she was married at the age of 16, to a man named Joseph Clarke, who worked as a stonemason. However, shortly after the marriage, her husband went bankrupt, and Mary Anne Clarke left him because of this in February 1802. They had four children:

1. Mary Anne Clarke (January 1794), who married Charles Proby Bowles, and had two sons.
2. Edward Clarke (28 July 1795 - 1800)
3. Ellen Jocelyn Cecile Clarke (19 August 1796 – 1870), married Louis Mathurin Busson du Maurier, and had a son.
4. George Nowell William Clarke (21 November 1797 – 27 July 1861), married Emma Lewis.

By 1803, Clarke had been established long enough in the world of courtesans to receive the attention of Prince Frederick, Duke of York, then the commander-in-chief of the army.

Taking her as his mistress, he set her up in a fashionable residence in Gloucester Place in Marylebone. However, he failed to supply the funds necessary to support their lavish lifestyle. In 1809, a national scandal arose when Clarke testified before the House of Commons that she had sold army commissions with the Duke of York's knowledge.

The scandal was the subject of much humour and mockery, especially by caricaturists such as Isaac Cruikshank who created multiple graphics making fun of the scandal. Cruikshank combined mockery of the scandal while also satirizing Napoleon, portraying him and his generals reading four of his caricatures of the Prince Frederick, Duke of York and Albany and Mary.

Frederick was forced to resign from his position, though he was later reinstated.

After the Duke of York resigned his post as Commander in Chief of the Army, and before he was later reinstated, he cut all ties to Clarke, paying her a considerable sum to prevent her from publishing letters he had written to her during their relationship. When the scandal forced Clarke to leave London, she took a tenancy of Loughton Lodge, Loughton, Essex. This house still exists, and a blue plaque to Mary Anne Clarke was unveiled on it in April 2009. There are in fact two blue plaques, one on the front, and a duplicate on the back elevation.

Clarke was prosecuted for libel in 1813 and imprisoned for nine months. On her release from prison, she went to live in France. She died in Boulogne-sur-Mer on 21 June 1852.

== Legacy and writings ==
Her daughter, Ellen, born of her marriage to Clarke, married Louis-Mathurin Busson du Maurier, and was the mother of the caricaturist George du Maurier (1834–96) and the great-grandmother of the novelist Daphne du Maurier (1907–1989), who wrote a book about her, Mary Anne.

Writings by Mary Anne Clarke include the following:

- The Authentic and Impartial Life of Mrs. Mary Anne Clarke, Including Numerous Royal and Other Original Letters, and Anecdotes of Distinguished Persons, Which Have Escaped Suppression, with a Compendious View of the Whole Proceedings, Illustrative of the Late Important Investigation of the Conduct of His Royal Highness the Duke of York, &C. &C. and a Curious Poem. London: T. Kelly, 1809.
- The Rival Princes; Or, A Faithful Narrative of Facts, Relating to Mrs. M.A. Clarke's Political Acquaintance with Colonel Wardle, Major Dodd, &C. &C. &C., Who Were Concerned in the Charges against the Duke of York; Together with a Variety of Authentic and Important Letters, and Curious and Interesting Anecdotes of Several Persons of Political Notoriety. London: Printed for the author, and published by C. Chapple, 1810.

She co-authored with Elizabeth Taylor:

- Authentic Memoirs of Mrs. Clarke. London: T. Tegg, 1809.

With Gwyllym Lloyd Wardle, Francis Wright, and Daniel Wright:

- Wardle Versus Clarke, &c.: The Trial of F. Wright, D. Wright, and Mary Ann Clarke for a Conspiracy against G. L. Wardle Before Lord Ellenborough in the Court of King's Bench, Westminster on December the 11th, 1809. London: J. Day, 1809.
