= Mary Anne (novel) =

1954 novel by Daphne du Maurier

First US edition (publ. Doubleday)

Daphne du Maurier's 1954 novel Mary Anne is a fictionalised account of the real-life story of her great-great-grandmother, Mary Anne Clarke, née Thompson (1776–1852). It was published by Gollancz in the UK and by Doubleday in the US.

Mary Anne Clarke from 1803 to 1808 was mistress of Frederick Augustus, the Duke of York and Albany (1763–1827).

He was "The Grand Old Duke of York" of the nursery rhyme, a son of King George III and brother of the later King George IV.
