= Rule Britannia (novel) =

1972 novel by Daphne du Maurier

- First edition
- Author: Daphne du Maurier
- Cover artist: Keith Richens
- Language: English
- Publisher: Victor Gollancz Ltd
- Publication date: 1972
- Publication place: United Kingdom
- Media type: Print
- Pages: 318
- ISBN: 0-575-01598-5

Rule Britannia is Daphne du Maurier's last novel, published in 1972 by Victor Gollancz. The novel is set in a fictional near future in which the UK's recent withdrawal from the EEC has brought the country to the verge of bankruptcy.

== Plot summary ==
Emma, 20, lives with her elderly grandmother, Mad (short for Madam), a famous retired actress, in the small village of Poldrea in Cornwall. They share a large house near the coast with Mad's six ‘maladjusted’ adopted sons who range in age from 3 to 18. One morning, Emma wakes to the sound of aeroplanes overhead. An American warship has anchored in the bay and United States Marines are marching over the fields. They are trigger-happy, and one of them shoots and kills a local farmer's dog.

After some hours of civil confusion, a television announcement is made by the prime minister: due to recent economic and military failures on the continent, the UK and the USA have joined together as a single nation, to be called USUK. The new government of USUK declares a state of emergency, institutes roadblocks, and cuts local telephone and postal communication. To Mad and her family the US Marines appear less like invited friends than a hostile invading force.

Andy, 12, one of Mad's adopted boys who has an obsession with bows and arrows and a hazy understanding of the concepts of right and wrong, shoots and kills one of the Marines. Mad, Emma and some of the locals cover up the death, and throw the body over the cliff into the sea. It is not found for several days, and in the absence of a culprit the military authorities crack down on the local population by cutting food, electricity and water supplies, and arresting and taking into custody all the local men and youths.

Mad encourages the local farmers to an act of civil disobedience in which huge piles of rotting manure are dumped in front of the local pub where the American military authorities have arranged their thanksgiving celebrations. Shortly afterwards, there is a huge explosion which sinks the warship in the bay. Nobody knows the cause, but in a televised speech the prime minister hints of sabotage "by unknown agents hostile to USUK”.

Mad and her family retreat to their cellar, where they subsist for several days on apples and beetroot, and water from a re-opened well. Early one morning, Emma and the boys are woken by aircraft and what appears to be gunfire, explosions and depth charges, while Mad sleeps on. Power has been restored, and a television announcer states that the sinking of the warship may have been caused by torpedo action. In any event, the security regulations have been relaxed, and the Marines are to leave the local area. A stream of helicopters flies overhead, leaving Cornwall.

The local doctor arrives in his Land Rover. Emma notices Mad standing in welcome at her porch, but when she realises that nobody else can see her she tells the doctor that he had better go down into the basement, where Mad has been asleep for a very long time. The novel concludes with the helicopters still flying eastward into the sun.

== Dedication ==
The book is dedicated to the actress Gladys Cooper, who died in 1971. Cooper had been one of the leading ladies of Daphne's father, the actor and impresario Gerald du Maurier.

== Background ==
Du Maurier started work on the novel early in 1972, following up an idea she had had for "a funny novel … mocking everything". It was to be "a mockup of what this country may be like in the mid-seventies”, and on its completion she was sure that she had pulled off a fast and funny piece of satire that would be "popular autumn reading".

== Critical reception ==
Reviewers did not share the author's opinion of her work, and most notices were unenthusiastic. There was general consensus that, at best, the novel was pedestrian and, at worst, it was plain silly. Du Maurier's biographer, Margaret Forster, called it in 1993 "the poorest novel she ever wrote".

Ella Westland, in her introduction to the 2004 Virago reprint, called the tone of the book "mocking" – shifting from the funny and farcical to the bleak and bizarre. Du Maurier's publishers were worried by the implausible plot, and it bemused many of her readers. Yet, Westland said, the novel is held together by its very absurdity. She noted that the author had known the story of Peter Pan since early childhood, her father Gerald du Maurier having regularly played Captain Hook on stage since before Daphne was born, and she held that the novel can be read as “Peter Pan meets the Marines, with Emma playing Wendy to Mad’s Peter Pan”. Mad's boys are the six Lost Boys adopted by the Darlings. But she considered that du Maurier had put more of her own character into Mad than she had realised.

Westland suggested that du Maurier's motive in writing the book was to explore her own feelings about the Britain that her grandchildren would inherit. She hated the superior attitude of London, and the crass interventions from up-country. In the novel she tried to give Cornwall back to the Cornish and let them defend their own land.

== See also ==
- Rule, Britannia! – 1740 British patriotic song
- Invasion literature
