= The Glass-Blowers =

1963 novel by Daphne du Maurier

- First edition
- Author: Daphne du Maurier
- Language: English
- Genre: Historical fiction
- Publisher: Victor Gollancz Ltd
- Publication date: 1963
- Publication place: United Kingdom
- Media type: Print (hardcover)
- OCLC: 300029200

The Glass-Blowers is a 1963 novel by Daphne du Maurier.

The novel tells the story of a French family of glassblowers, the Bussons, charting their journey before, during and after the French Revolution.

The story is based loosely on du Maurier's own family history, she being a fifth-generation descendant of a master glassblower who had moved to England during the French Revolution.

== Plot summary ==
In 1841, Sophie Duval receives a letter from her daughter, Zoe, telling of a man she has met who shares her mother's maiden name. Sophie arranges to meet the man, Louis-Mathurin Busson, having established that he is the son of her eldest brother Robert. After meeting him and finding confirming who he is, Sophie tells the story of her family and how Robert's son grew up in England not knowing of his family in France.

The Bussons were a successful family of glassblowers who produced high quality pieces for the aristocracy. The eldest son, Robert shows a lot of talent as a glassblower but is desperate to be part of higher society. This leads him into financial trouble and needs to be rescued by his father.

The second son of the family, Pierre, has no interest in glass and is sent away by the family to Martinique to work with a rich planter. Later, after his return and the death of his father, he becomes a notary to help the repressed.

Sophie marries one of Michel's friends, François helps with the running of the refinery. She keeps in contact with Robert, though cannot understand his obsession with high society.

Michel takes up the family trade but never does as well as his father and brother before him.

Edmé, hoping for an easy life, marries a rich, older man who is tax collector.

As the Revolution takes place, Robert's allegiances lead him abroad to safety in England. Abandoning his son, Jaques, with his family in France, Robert leaves with his second wife. He hopes to ingratiate himself with members of the exiled aristocracy but without success.

Michel and François lead groups of militia and gradually find themselves in positions of authority, using fear of attacks by Royalists to leverage power. Edmé's separates from her husband who later flees to avoid being caught by the revolutionaries.

With France a more settled country, Robert returns, abandoning his family and leaving them to believe he has died on the voyage across the Channel. He is reconciled with his brothers but his son he abandoned, Jaques, wants nothing to do with him.

Michel succumbs to a lung disease. Pierre drowns trying to rescue a dog. Robert and Edmé die too, leaving Sophie as the last remaining sibling. She spends her last days writing letters to Robert's son, Louis, to tell him of the family history.

== Principal characters ==
- Mathurin Busson: Master glassblower and patriarch of the family
- Magdaleine Labbé / Busson: Matriarch of the family
- Robert Busson: The eldest son. A talented glassblower who has dreams of having a higher place in society
- Pierre Busson: Second son of the family. Has little interest in glassblowing and becomes a notary and champion for citizens' rights
- Michel Busson: The youngest son of the family. Afflicted with a stutter, he is a talented glassblower but lacks the flair of his father and brother
- Sophie Busson / Duval: Daughter of Mathurin and the narrator for most of the story
- Edmé Busson: Youngest of the children who shared Pierre's passion for the rights of the people
