= The Years Between (film) =

- Danish poster
- Directed by: Compton Bennett
- Written by: Muriel Box; Sydney Box
- Based on: the play by Daphne du Maurier
- Produced by: Sydney Box; Betty E. Box
- Starring: Michael Redgrave; Valerie Hobson; Flora Robson
- Cinematography: Reginald H. Wyer
- Edited by: Gordon Hales
- Music by: Benjamin Frankel
- Production company: Sydney Box Productions
- Distributed by: General Film Distributors
- Release date: 3 April 1946
- Running time: 88 minutes
- Country: United Kingdom
- Language: English
- Box office: £153,000 (UK) (by July 1953)

The Years Between (1946) is a British film directed by Compton Bennett and starring Michael Redgrave, Valerie Hobson and Flora Robson in an adaptation of the 1945 play The Years Between by Daphne du Maurier. It was shot at the Riverside Studios.

== Plot ==
In June 1940, Diana Wentworth receives a telegram informing her that her husband Michael, a British MI6 colonel who had been working with the French Resistance, has been killed by the Nazis in France during the Second World War. She struggles to accept this, but is helped by the family nanny. The nanny encourages her to stand for Parliament in her late husband's seat and is supported by Sir Ernest Foster.

She lives in rural middle England on a large country estate, where her husband had supported local interests. She decides she can fill several of his roles. Not everyone supports a female in this capacity. She is pursued by a neighbouring landowner, Richard Llewelyn, who, during a V-1 attack, kisses her and proposes.

At the end of the war, Michael is found in a prisoner-of-war camp liberated by the Russians. Sir Ernest phones Diana to inform her on the day she was to wed Richard, and all must now adjust to the new situation.

Back home, Michael becomes reacquainted with his son Rodney ("Robin"). He finds his wardrobe empty, passed to charity. Richard and Diana meet. He tells her there is only one thing she can do: stay with her husband. Diana tells Richard that she loves him, but confesses she does not know how she feels about Michael. She does feel obliged to help Michael adjust. Michael is surprised to find she is an MP and is effectively doing his job. He asks her to stop and let him have his role back. He wants to turn back time. He eventually finds out about Richard but is less concerned about this than taking his seat back in the House of Commons. When Diana is resistant to the idea, he goes to see Sir Ernest, but the latter suggests he wait until the general election in a few months. The couple decide to split, though the nanny tries to arbitrate.

Ultimately, Diana returns to Michael in both heart and mind. The film ends with them both in the House of Commons.

== Cast ==
- Michael Redgrave as Col. Michael Wentworth
- Valerie Hobson as Diana Wentworth
- Flora Robson as Nanny
- James McKechnie as Richard Llewellyn
- Felix Aylmer as Sir Ernest Foster
- Dulcie Gray as Judy
- John Gilpin as Robin Wentworth
- Edward Rigby as Postman
- Esma Cannon as Effie
- Lyn Evans as Ames
- Wylie Watson as Venning
- Yvonne Owen as Alice
- Muriel Aked as Mrs. May
- Joss Ambler as Atherton
- Ernest Butcher as Old Man
- Katie Johnson as Old Man's wife

== Release ==
According to trade papers, the film was a "notable box office attraction" at British cinemas.

=== Critical reception ===
The New York Times wrote, "an intimate and sometimes touching tale...Intelligently handled by Compton Bennett who directed the drama with an eye toward distilling character and perception from his cast...But it is rather unfortunate that the cast's intense and genuine portrayals are not matched by the over-all effect of this serious but heavy vehicle."

It was the 22nd most popular film at the British box office in 1946 after The Wicked Lady, The Bells of St. Mary's, Piccadilly Incident, The Captive Heart, Road to Utopia, Caravan, Anchors Aweigh, The Corn Is Green, Gilda, The House on 92nd Street, The Overlanders, Appointment with Crime, The Bandit of Sherwood Forest, Kitty, Spellbound, Scarlet Street, Men of Two Worlds, Courage of Lassie, Mildred Pierce, The Spiral Staircase and Brief Encounter.
