= The Years Between (play) =

1945 play by Daphne du Maurier

First edition (publ. Gollancz, 1945)

The Years Between is a play by the English writer Daphne du Maurier, better known as a novelist and particularly as the author of Rebecca (which she had adapted for the London stage in 1940). This is one of two original plays that she wrote. The other is September Tide (1948).

== Plot outline ==
Set against the backdrop of the Second World War, The Years Between unfolds in the library/living room of an English country house. The man of the house, Colonel Michael Wentworth, MP, is presumed dead after his plane crashed into the sea on a flight to Europe in 1942.

His wife Diana is persuaded to take over the Colonel's parliamentary seat, and she is supported in her endeavours by her neighbour Richard Llewellyn, a sympathetic farmer with whom she strikes up a romantic relationship. Llewellyn teaches the Wentworths' young son Robin how to fish, thus becoming his great friend.

Three years later, as the war is about to come to an end, the Colonel returns. He has been playing a key role in organising the resistance movement in Occupied Europe, and his disappearance and death were staged by the authorities to provide convincing cover for his activities. The remainder of the play deals with the fallout of Michael's return on the various protagonists.

== Production history ==
The Years Between was first performed on stage at the Manchester Opera House in the autumn of 1944. It then transferred to London, opening at Wyndham's Theatre on 10 January 1945 starring Nora Swinburne and Clive Brook. The production, directed by Irene Hentschel became a long-running West End hit, completing 617 performances.

It was also turned into a 1946 film starring Michael Redgrave and Valerie Hobson. After 60 years of neglect the play was revived by Caroline Smith at the Orange Tree Theatre in Richmond upon Thames on 5 September 2007, starring Karen Ascoe, Mark Tandy and Michael Lumsden in the principal roles.

== Background to the play ==
Du Maurier had begun writing the play in the summer of 1943 which, according to Margaret Forster’s biography, she frankly admitted was autobiographical, although also based on another real-life story.

"John Rathbone, MP for Bodmin, was reported missing in 1940. His wife was returned unopposed to fill his place when his death was confirmed. In 1942 she remarried and shortly afterwards it was rumoured that her first husband was, after all, alive and a prisoner. The rumour turned out to be untrue." (Note 3, page 434)

Involved with the West End production and being at Wyndham's (her father Sir Gerald’s old theatre) du Maurier found "was a disturbing experience." Clive Brook as the soldier-husband was so sympathetic, while Nora Swinburne as the wife made her character unattractive, "and it seemed to her the whole balance of the play was wrecked."

Reviewing for the Evening Standard on 13 January 1945 (four months before VE Day), under the headline "It Might Have Been So Good", the critic (and MP) Beverley Baxter wrote: "When the curtain rose again we waited for the unfolding of a tragedy or the playing out of an ironic comedy. Unhappily, Miss du Maurier had shot her bolt. Having created an admirable situation, she could do nothing to resolve it. So she decided to end the war, which was accomplished by the use of the radio and, one has to record, to the titters of some people in the audience." And he concluded: "What a pity that Miss du Maurier abandoned the play for a message! There are so many messages these days and so few plays."

== Film review ==
The Stage review of the 2007 Orange Tree revival found that "the play offers only a toff's eye of Britain at war" with a live-in servant and "a cellar full of claret, even if Spam fritters are on the menu." This was also brought out forcefully by Richard Winnington in his devastating but still relevant film review (News Chronicle, London, 25 May. 1946).

He calls Compton Bennett's film "a poor and empty adaptation of a poor and empty play" which "enshrines the worst characteristics of the British film, and condones the worst qualities of the least representative section of the British race." Chiding the producers, Sydney Box and his sister Betty, who also wrote the screenplay, he describes it as a "novelettish distortion" of a contemporary problem.

"Alas’’ he continues, "the note is one of genteel reverence. We are at war in 1940 but not an aeroplane engine is heard. A realistic plastic reproduction of the House of Commons was erected solely for the purpose of allowing Miss Valerie Hobson M.P. to make her maiden speech [strong on] cliché value. Yet Mr Churchill’s and Mr Morrison’s doubles – and the whole House – are staggered by its brilliance. This in 1941."

Finally, he notes, "The returned soldier of Michael Redgrave, with a highly justifiable dislike of everything and everybody he finds, is the only character you can believe in, and there isn’t one you can like, and that goes particularly for nanny Flora Robson."

In 2011, Dominic Cavendish, reviewing a Production at Deangate Theatre in Northampton, describes the play as "finally getting the kind of push it needed to place it permanently on the map of essential 20th century theatre". He notes how the play deals not with the Second World War, but its consequences in changing the lives of men and women irreversibly, "exemplified and exacerbated in a middle class marriage."
