= The House on the Strand =

1969 novel by Daphne du Maurier

- First edition
- Author: Daphne Du Maurier
- Cover artist: Flavia Tower
- Language: English
- Publisher: Victor Gollancz
- Publication date: 1969
- Publication place: United Kingdom
- Media type: Print
- Pages: 351
- ISBN: 0-575-00287-5

The House on the Strand is a novel by Daphne du Maurier, first published in the UK in 1969 by Victor Gollancz, with a jacket illustration by her daughter, Flavia Tower. The US edition was published by Doubleday.

Like many of du Maurier's novels, The House on the Strand has a supernatural element, exploring the ability to mentally travel back in time and experience historical events at first hand - but not to influence them. It has been called a Gothic tale, "influenced by writers as diverse as Robert Louis Stevenson, Dante, and the psychologist Carl Jung, in which a sinister potion enables the central character to escape the constraints of his dreary married life by travelling back through time". The narrator agrees to test a drug that transports him back to 14th century Cornwall and becomes absorbed in the lives of people he meets there, to the extent that the two worlds he is living in start to merge.

It is set in and around Kilmarth, where Daphne du Maurier lived from 1967, near the village of Tywardreath, which in Cornish means "House on the Strand".

== Plot ==
The setting for the story is an ancient Cornish house called Kilmarth (based on the house the author had leased following the death of her husband).

After giving up his job, the narrator, Dick Young, is offered the use of Kilmarth by an old university friend, biophysicist Magnus Lane. Dick reluctantly agrees to act as a test subject for a drug that Magnus has secretly developed. On taking it for the first time, he finds that it enables him to enter into the landscape around him as it existed during the early 14th century. He becomes drawn into the lives of the people he sees there, and is soon addicted to the experience. Dick finds himself following Roger, who lives at Kilmarth, acts as steward to Sir Henry Champernoune, and is a secret admirer of the beautiful Isolda, wife of Sir Oliver Carminowe. She has been conducting a secret affair with the brother of Sir Henry's wife, Sir Otto Bodrugan, who is waylaid and killed by Oliver's men.

Each visit corresponds to a key moment in the story of Isolda and Roger. Each time Dick returns to the present he becomes more confused. Throughout the experience he is unable to interact with the couple; any attempt to do so brings him crashing back to the present in a state of nauseated exhaustion. The drug has other dangers: following Roger means that Dick walks unaware through the modern landscape with all the risks that entails. Early on, he is nearly run over by a passing car, whilst experiencing being in the 14th century

Dick finds himself back in the present after witnessing the murder of Isolde's lover. He and his American wife Vita have had some friends to stay overnight, and Dick starts recounting the scene to one of them who believes it has just happened, and urges him to call the police. Dick has to make excuses, and it becomes clear that the timelines are becoming confused in his mind. His physical symptoms including excessive sweating and bloodshot eyes cause comments. Later on he starts to experience problems using his right hand.

Vita and his young stepsons having joined Dick at Kilmarth they become worried by his bizarre behaviour. Dick no longer finds his wife attractive, does not want the new job in the US she has found for him, and has no fatherly affection for her two boys—hence his increasing desire to escape into the past. Magnus proposes to join Dick, but is killed in what seems like a bizarre accident or suicide—struck by a train whilst straying onto a local railway track. Dick knows that Magnus was under the influence of the drug. He has to give evidence at the inquest and astonishes everyone by speaking of it having been snowing on the day of Magnus's death, which had in fact occurred in July.

Dick's penultimate trip ends when he attempts to defend Isolda from Sir Henry's vindictive widow Joanna, resulting him in the present unwittingly attacking Vita. Dick learns from a doctor of the drug's extremely dangerous nature. However, his addiction causes him to take the final remaining dose soon after.

Dick's last visit occurs during the Black Death in 1349. Isolda is dead, and a dying Roger confesses that he had administered a lethal drug to her 13 years earlier to save her from humiliation and ill treatment at the hands of her husband and sister in law. In the absence of both Roger and Isolda, Dick has little incentive to return to the 14th century, but in any case there is no drug left to allow his passage there. The book closes with Dick suddenly finding that he is unable to grip a telephone.

== Ending ==
Speaking of the novel's unresolved ending, the author said in an interview: "What about the hero of The House on the Strand? What did it mean when he dropped the telephone at the end of the book? I don’t really know, but I rather think he was going to be paralysed for life. Don’t you?"

== Radio versions ==
- 1973 BBC Radio Saturday Night Theatre - Adapted by Philip Leaver and Kay Patrick, starring Ian Richardson. BBC Genome BBC R4X Hidden Treasures
- 2008 BBC Radio 7, twelve part reading by Julian Wadham BBC Genome
