= Daphne du Maurier =

English novelist (1907–1989)

Dame Daphne du Maurier DBE
- du Maurier, c. 1930
- Born: 13 May 1907; London, England
- Died: 19 April 1989 (aged 81); Par, Cornwall, England
- Occupations: Novelist, playwright
- Spouse: Frederick Browning (m. 1932; died 1965)
- Children: 3
- Parents: Gerald du Maurier (father); Muriel Beaumont (mother)
- Relatives: Angela du Maurier (sister); Jeanne du Maurier (sister); George du Maurier (grandfather); Guy du Maurier (uncle); Sylvia Llewelyn Davies (aunt); The Llewelyn Davies boys (cousins); Comyns Beaumont (great uncle); Diana Beaumont (aunt); Gabrielle Beaumont (cousin); Mary Anne Clarke (ancestor)
- Writing career
- Period: 1931–1989
- Genres: Literary fiction, thriller
- Notable works: Jamaica Inn (1936); Rebecca (1938); Frenchman's Creek (1941); My Cousin Rachel (1951); "The Birds" (1952); The Scapegoat (1957); "Don't Look Now" (1971)
- Notable awards: National Book Award (U.S.)
- Website: www.dumaurier.org

Dame Daphne du Maurier, Lady Browning, (/duː ˈmɒrieɪ/; 13 May 1907 – 19 April 1989) was an English novelist, biographer and playwright. Her parents were actor-manager Sir Gerald du Maurier and his wife, actress Muriel Beaumont. Her grandfather George du Maurier was a writer and cartoonist. Du Maurier spent much of her life in Cornwall, where most of her works are set. As her fame increased, she became more reclusive.

Some of du Maurier's notable works include the novels Jamaica Inn (1936), Rebecca (1938) and My Cousin Rachel (1951), and the short stories "The Birds" (1952) and "Don't Look Now" (1971). Her works have been adapted into film, with notable examples including Jamaica Inn (1939), Rebecca (1940) and The Birds (1963) by Alfred Hitchcock, Don't Look Now (1973) by Nicolas Roeg, My Cousin Rachel (2017) by Roger Michell, and Rebecca (2020) by Ben Wheatley.

== Early life ==
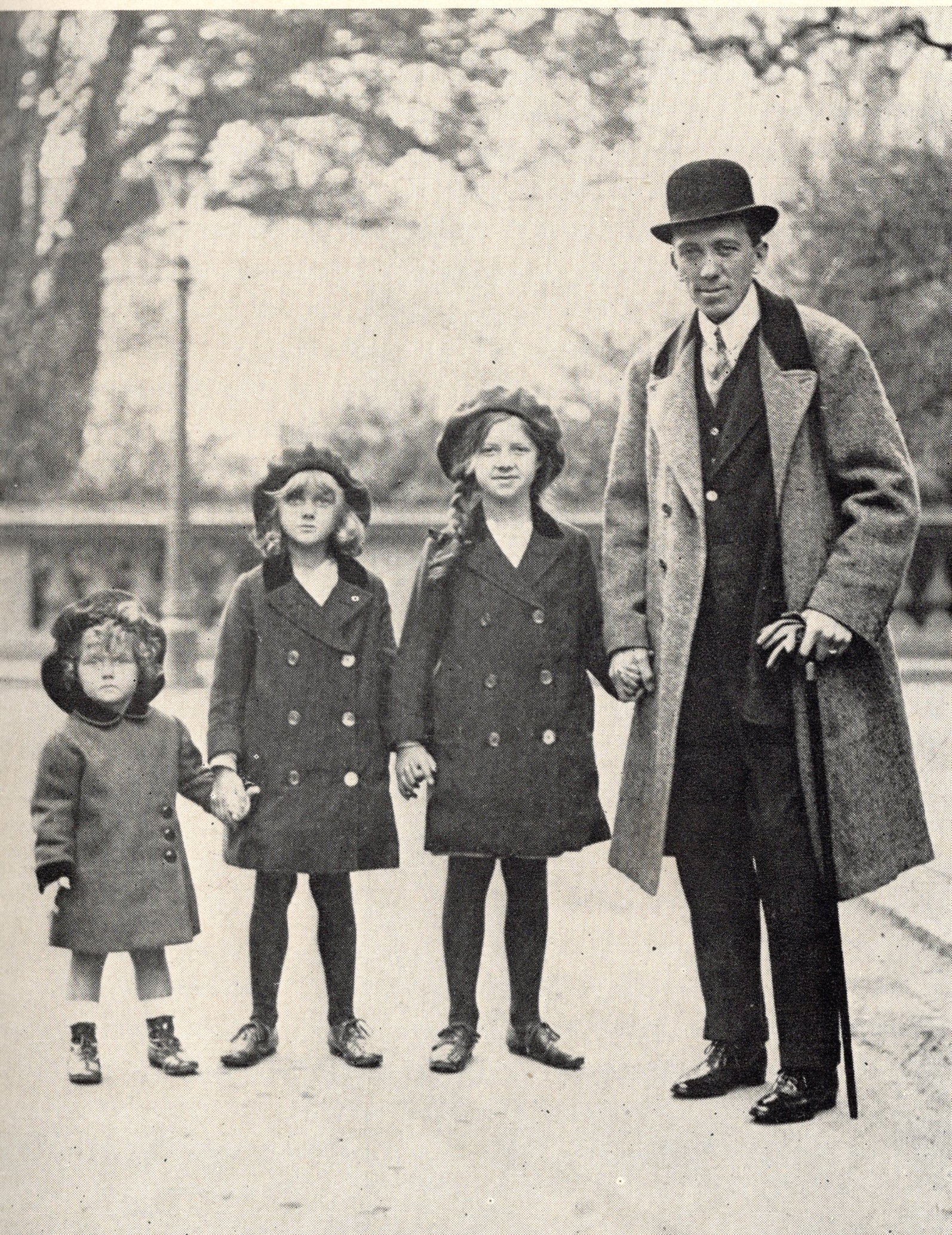
Six-year-old du Maurier (centre) with her sisters Jeanne (left) and Angela (right) and father Gerald du Maurier in 1913

Daphne du Maurier was born on 13 May 1907 at 24 Cumberland Terrace, Regent's Park, London, the middle of three daughters of prominent actor-manager Sir Gerald du Maurier and actress Muriel Beaumont. Her paternal grandfather was George du Maurier, Punch cartoonist and author of the 1894 novel Trilby. Her paternal uncle Guy du Maurier was a playwright. Her mother was a paternal niece of journalist, author, and lecturer Comyns Beaumont. Her elder sister, Angela du Maurier, became an actress and later also a writer, and her younger sister Jeanne du Maurier was a painter. She was a first cousin of the Llewelyn Davies boys, who were J. M. Barrie's inspiration for the characters in the play Peter Pan; or, The Boy Who Wouldn't Grow Up. She was also a cousin of director Gabrielle Beaumont.

As a child, du Maurier met many prominent theatre actors, because of the celebrity of her father. On meeting Tallulah Bankhead, du Maurier was quoted as saying that Bankhead was the most beautiful creature she had ever seen.

Du Maurier spent her childhood at Cannon Hall, Hampstead, the family's London residence, and summers at their home in Fowey, Cornwall, where they also lived during the war years.

== Career ==
=== Novels, short stories, and biographies ===
Her family connections helped her establish her literary career, and she published some of her early work in her great-uncle Comyns Beaumont's Bystander magazine. Her first novel, The Loving Spirit, was published in 1931.

The Gothic novel Rebecca (1938) was du Maurier's most successful work. It was an immediate hit, selling nearly 3 million copies between 1938 and 1965. The novel has never gone out of print. In the United States, du Maurier won the National Book Award for favourite novel of 1938, voted by members of the American Booksellers Association. In the UK, it was listed at number 14 of the "nation's best-loved novel"s on the BBC's 2003 survey The Big Read.

Other significant works include Jamaica Inn, Frenchman's Creek, Hungry Hill, My Cousin Rachel, The Scapegoat, The House on the Strand, and The King's General. The last is set in Cornwall during the English Civil War, and is written from the Royalist perspective.

Du Maurier was often categorised as a "romantic novelist", a term that she deplored, given that her novels rarely have a happy ending, and often have sinister overtones and shadows of the paranormal. In this light, she has more in common with the "sensation novels" of Wilkie Collins and others, which she admired. The critic Kate Kellaway wrote: "Du Maurier was mistress of calculated irresolution. She did not want to put her readers' minds at rest. She wanted her riddles to persist. She wanted the novels to continue to haunt us beyond their endings."

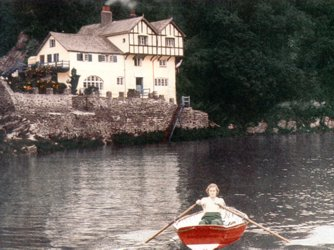
du Maurier rowing near her Ferryside home in 1931

Du Maurier's novel Mary Anne (1954) is a fictionalised account of her great-great-grandmother, Mary Anne Clarke née Thompson (1776–1852), who, from 1803 to 1808, was mistress of Frederick Augustus, Duke of York and Albany (1763–1827). He was the "Grand Old Duke of York" of the nursery rhyme, a son of King George III, and brother of King George IV and King William IV. The central character of her last novel, Rule Britannia, is an aging actress, thought to be based on Gladys Cooper (to whom it is dedicated).

Du Maurier's short stories are darker: "The Birds", "Don't Look Now", "The Apple Tree", and "The Blue Lenses" are finely crafted tales of terror that shocked and surprised her audience in equal measure. As her biographer Margaret Forster wrote, "She satisfied all the questionable criteria of popular fiction, and yet satisfied too the exacting requirements of 'real literature'."

The discovery, in 2011, of a collection of du Maurier's forgotten short stories, written when the author was 21, provides some insight into her mature style. One of them, "The Doll", concerns a young woman's obsession with a mechanical male sex doll; it has been deemed by du Maurier's son Kit Browning to be "quite ahead of its time".

She also wrote non-fiction, including several biographies such as Gerald, her father's biography. The Glass-Blowers traces her French Huguenot ancestry and vividly depicts the French Revolution. The du Mauriers traces the family's move from France to England in the 19th century.

The House on the Strand (1969) combines elements of "mental time-travel", a tragic love affair in 14th-century Cornwall, and the dangers of using mind-altering drugs. Her final book, Rule Britannia (1972), was not well-received, her biographer, Margaret Forster, considering it to be the author's poorest novel.

=== Major film and television adaptations ===
- Jamaica Inn (1939 film) – Directed by Alfred Hitchcock, starring Maureen O'Hara and Charles Laughton.
- Rebecca (1940 film) – Directed by Alfred Hitchcock, starring Laurence Olivier and Joan Fontaine.
- Frenchman's Creek (1944 film) – Directed by Mitchell Leisen, starring Joan Fontaine and Arturo de Córdova.
- The Years Between (1946 film) – Directed by Compton Bennett, starring Valerie Hobson and Michael Redgrave.
- Hungry Hill (1947 film) – Directed by Brian Desmond Hurst, starring Margaret Lockwood and Dennis Price.
- My Cousin Rachel (1952 film) – Directed by Henry Koster, starring Olivia de Havilland and Richard Burton.
- The Scapegoat (1959 film) – Directed by Robert Hamer, starring Alec Guinness and Bette Davis.
- The Birds (1963 film, based on the short story) – Directed by Alfred Hitchcock, starring Tippi Hedren and Rod Taylor.
- Don't Look Now (1973 film, based on the short story) – Directed by Nicolas Roeg, starring Julie Christie and Donald Sutherland.
- Rebecca (1979 TV series) – BBC adaptation starring Jeremy Brett and Joanna David.
- Jamaica Inn (1983 TV serial) – Starring Jane Seymour and Patrick McGoohan.
- My Cousin Rachel (1983 TV serial) – BBC adaptation starring Geraldine Chaplin.
- The Birds II: Land's End (1994 TV film sequel) – Directed by Rick Rosenthal.
- Rebecca (1997 TV miniseries) – Starring Charles Dance, Emilia Fox and Diana Rigg.
- The Scapegoat (2012 TV film) – Directed by Charles Sturridge, starring Matthew Rhys and Eileen Atkins.
- Jamaica Inn (2014 TV miniseries) – Produced by the BBC, starring Jessica Brown Findlay.
- My Cousin Rachel (2017 film) – Directed by Roger Michell, starring Rachel Weisz and Sam Claflin.
- Rebecca (2020 film) – Directed by Ben Wheatley, starring Lily James and Armie Hammer.

Du Maurier was notoriously critical of screen adaptations of her work. She often maintained that the only two feature films she liked were Hitchcock's Rebecca (1940) and Nicolas Roeg's Don't Look Now (1973).

- Jamaica Inn (1939): Disavowed by both Hitchcock and du Maurier. The ending was rewritten to accommodate the star status and ego of Charles Laughton (playing Sir Humphrey Pengallan), diluting the tension of the source material.
- Rebecca (1940): Approved by du Maurier largely due to producer David O. Selznick's strict requirement that the screenplay adhere closely to her original text, counteracting Hitchcock's inclination to make broader changes.
- My Cousin Rachel (1952): Du Maurier felt that Olivia de Havilland was miscast in the role of the enigmatic anti-heroine Rachel, missing the darker ambiguity of the character.
- The Scapegoat (1959): Partly financed by du Maurier herself, who lobbied to have Alec Guinness cast in the lead. She subsequently expressed regret over his casting, feeling the production failed to capture the nuances of the characters.
- The Birds (1963): Based on her short story, the film version was strongly disliked by du Maurier. She was baffled by Hitchcock's decision to move the setting from rural Cornwall to sunny California and shift the narrative focus away from her bleak apocalyptic tone.
- Don't Look Now (1973): Although du Maurier initially harboured reservations about the explicit tone and cinematic choices of Nicolas Roeg's direction, she wrote to Roeg after viewing the completed film to praise how well it captured the psychological atmosphere of her story.

=== Playwright ===
Du Maurier wrote three plays. Her first was an adaptation of her novel Rebecca, which opened at the Queen's Theatre in London on 5 March 1940 in a production by George Devine, starring Celia Johnson and Owen Nares as the De Winters and Margaret Rutherford as Mrs Danvers. After 181 performances, the production transferred to the Strand Theatre, with Jill Furse taking over as the second Mrs De Winter and Mary Merrall as Mrs Danvers, with a further run of 176 performances.

In 1943 she wrote the autobiographically inspired drama The Years Between about the unexpected return of a senior officer, thought killed in action, who finds that his wife has taken his seat as Member of Parliament (MP) and has started a romantic relationship with a local farmer. It was first staged at the Manchester Opera House in 1944 and then transferred to London, opening at Wyndham's Theatre on 10 January 1945, starring Nora Swinburne and Clive Brook. The production, directed by Irene Hentschel, became a long-running hit, completing 617 performances. It was revived by Caroline Smith at the Orange Tree Theatre in Richmond upon Thames on 5 September 2007, starring Karen Ascoe and Mark Tandy.

Her third play, September Tide, portrays a middle-aged woman whose bohemian artist son-in-law falls in love with her. Again directed by Irene Hentschel, it opened at the Aldwych Theatre on 15 December 1948 with Gertrude Lawrence as Stella. It closed in August 1949 after 267 performances.

=== Accusations of plagiarism ===
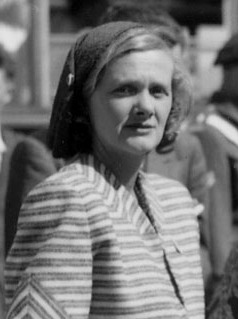
du Maurier arriving in the Netherlands in 1947

Two authors accused du Maurier of plagiarism, but were unable to prove their claims.

==== Rebecca ====
Shortly after Rebecca was published in Brazil, critic Álvaro Lins pointed out many resemblances to the 1934 book, A Sucessora (The Successor), by Brazilian writer Carolina Nabuco. According to Nabuco and her editor, not only the main plot, but also situations and entire dialogues had been copied. Du Maurier denied having copied Nabuco's book, as did her publisher, pointing out that the plot elements said to have been plagiarised were quite common.

The controversy was examined in a 2002 article by Larry Rohter in The New York Times. According to Nabuco's memoirs, when the Hitchcock film Rebecca was first shown in Brazil, United Artists wanted Nabuco to sign a document stating that the similarities were merely a coincidence but she refused. Rohter quotes Nabuco's memoirs as saying

When the film version of Rebecca came to Brazil, the producers' lawyer sought out my lawyer to ask him that I sign a document admitting the possibility of there having been a mere coincidence. I would be compensated with a quantity described as 'of considerable value.' I did not consent, naturally.

Rohter says "the novels have identical plots and even some identical episodes" while providing no details. As for how du Maurier plagiarised a novel in Brazilian Portuguese that she could not read, Rohter offers an innuendo—"Nabuco had translated her novel into French and sent it to a publisher in Paris, who she learned was also Ms. du Maurier's [publisher] only after Rebecca became a worldwide success"—without obliging himself to substantiate any specific accusation.

Nabuco also translated her novel into English. According to one version, she sent the English translation to an agent in the United States with instructions to explore both American and British publication options. According to another version, she submitted the English translation directly to a British publisher. As with her French translation, Nabuco's English translation has never been published. Depending on who is speculating, du Maurier was supposedly given access to the English manuscript, the French manuscript, or both in identical but unconnected circumstances. No evidence has been produced to support any of this.

Reappraising A Sucessora and Rebecca in 2002, Brazilian scholar Zahidé Lupinacci Muzare concluded that they are, in any case, much less alike than folk memory suggests.

==== "The Birds" ====
Author Frank Baker's second novel, The Birds, was published by Peter Davies, du Maurier's first cousin, in 1936. Baker stated that it bore some resemblance to The Terror by Arthur Machen (first published 1917). When Alfred Hitchcock's The Birds was released in 1963, based on "The Birds" (1952) by du Maurier, Baker considered litigation against Universal Studios but his legal counsel stated: "The treatment of the general idea of attacks by birds in the two works is as different as it could be."

Du Maurier denied that she had ever read Baker's book. One source claims that du Maurier was a reader for Davies in 1936, but she was already a successful author by then, and spent most of 1936 in Alexandria with her family.

== Personal life ==
Du Maurier married Major (later Lieutenant-General) Frederick "Boy" Browning in 1932. They had three children:

- Tessa (b. 1933), who married Major Peter Paul John de Zulueta. After they divorced, she married David Montgomery, 2nd Viscount Montgomery of Alamein, in 1970.
- Flavia (b. 1937), who married Captain Alastair Tower. After they divorced, she married General Sir Peter Leng.
- Christian (b. 1940), a photographer and filmmaker. He married Olive White (Miss Ireland 1961).

She was known as Daphne du Maurier from 1907 to 1932, when she married Frederick Browning. Still writing as Daphne du Maurier during her marriage, she was also known as Lady Browning after her husband was knighted in 1946.

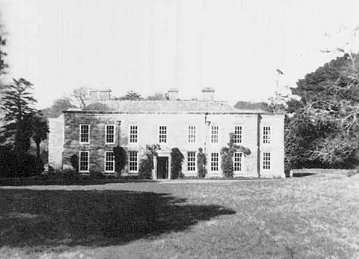
Menabilly house in Fowey, which du Maurier leased in 1943. She restored it from a neglected state, and made it her home until 1969.

Biographers have claimed that du Maurier's marriage was at times chilly, and that she could be aloof and distant to her children, the girls espeically, when immersed in her writing. She has often been painted as a frostily private recluse who rarely mixed in society or gave interviews, but many people remembered her as a warm and immensely funny person in private who was a welcoming hostess to guests at Menabilly, the house that she had leased for many years, from the Rashleigh family in Cornwall.

Her husband died in 1965 and soon afterward Daphne moved to Kilmarth, near Par, Cornwall, which became the setting for The House on the Strand, and where she became an early member of Mebyon Kernow, a Cornish nationalist party.

An exception to her reluctance to give interviews came after the release of the film A Bridge Too Far, based on a book by Cornelius Ryan, in which her late husband was portrayed in a less-than-flattering light. Incensed, she wrote to the national newspapers, decrying what she considered unforgivable treatment.

She appeared as a castaway in the BBC Radio programme Desert Island Discs broadcast on 3 September 1977. Her chosen book was The Collected Works of Jane Austen, and her luxury was whisky and ginger ale.

When she was made a Dame Commander of the Order of the British Empire in 1969, she was titled Dame Daphne du Maurier, Lady Browning, DBE, but she never used the title. According to her biographer Margaret Forster, she told no one about the honour, so that even her children learned of it only from the newspapers. "She thought of pleading illness for the investiture, until her children insisted it would be a great day for the older grandchildren. So she went through with it, though she slipped out quietly afterwards to avoid the attention of the press."

=== Relationships ===
The Daphne du Maurier Companion, edited by Helen Taylor, includes Taylor's claims that du Maurier confessed to her in 1965 that she had had an incestuous relationship with her father and that he had been a violent alcoholic. Du Maurier stated in her memoirs that because her father had wanted a son, she became a tomboy, in an attempt to get the parental approval she would have had, had she been born a boy.

In correspondence that her family released to biographer Margaret Forster, du Maurier explained to a trusted few intimates that she felt her personality comprised two distinct people – the loving wife and mother side she showed to the world, and the lover side, a "decidedly male energy", hidden from virtually everyone, which was the power behind her artistic creativity. According to Forster's biography, du Maurier believed the "male energy" propelled her writing.

After du Maurier's death in 1989, some writers speculated about her alleged intimate physical relationships with a number of women, including Ellen Doubleday, the wife of her U.S. publisher Nelson Doubleday, and the actress Gertrude Lawrence, as detailed in the 2007 BBC Two film, Daphne. (Note: Du Maurier's alleged affairs with Ellen Doubleday and Gertrude Lawrence were the subject of the 2007 BBC Two film, Daphne.) The children of both du Maurier and Lawrence have objected strongly to the stories about the alleged relationship between their mothers.

Two years after Lawrence died, a biography of her written by her widower, Richard Aldrich, detailed a friendship between her and du Maurier that had begun in 1948 when Lawrence had accepted the lead role in du Maurier's new play September Tide. Aldrich said that Lawrence had toured Britain in the play in 1948 and continued with it in London's West End theatre district through 1949, and that later du Maurier visited them at their home in the United States. Aldrich made no mention of a possible same-sex relationship.

=== Death ===
Du Maurier died from heart failure in her sleep on 19 April 1989, aged 81, at her home in Par, Cornwall, which had been the setting for many of her books. Her body was cremated in private and without a memorial service (at her request) and her ashes scattered off the cliffs around Kilmarth and Menabilly, Cornwall.

== Cultural references ==
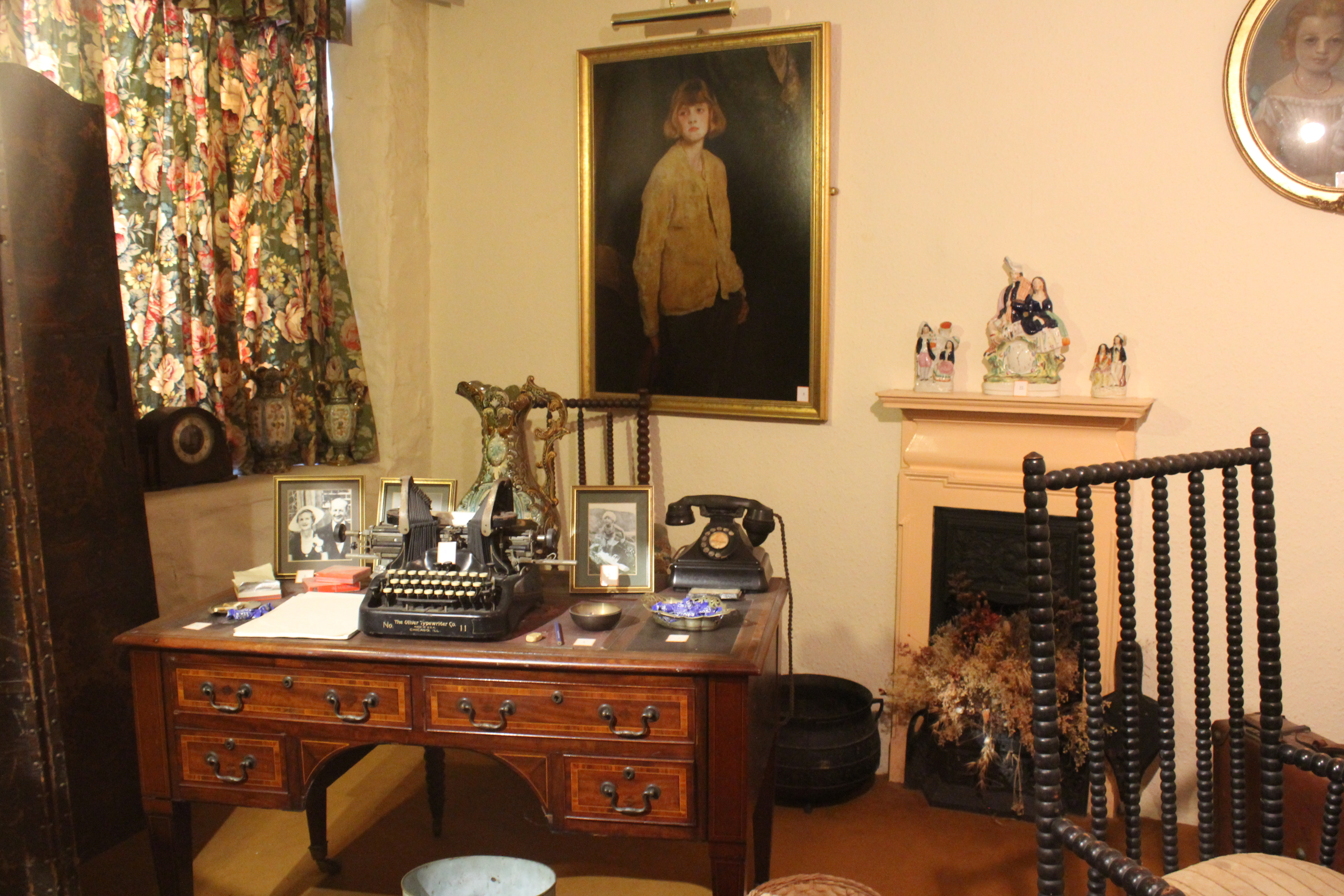
A recreation of du Maurier's study in Jamaica Inn, Cornwall, pictured in 2016

- Du Maurier's love of the outdoors and walking were written about in Annabel Abbs's book Windswept: Walking in the Footsteps of Remarkable Women (Two Roads, 2021) as she retraced the writer's walk along the Rhône river in France, accompanied by her Cornish neighbour and friend Clara Vyvyan.
- The dialogue of Nikos Nikolaidis' 1987 film Morning Patrol contains excerpts of du Maurier's published works.
- Daphne du Maurier was one of five "Women of Achievement" selected for a set of British stamps issued in August 1996.
- English Heritage caused controversy in June 2008 by denying an application to commemorate her home in Hampstead with a Blue Plaque. In 2011 a plaque was mounted on Cannon Cottage in Well Street, Hampstead, put up by the Heath and Hampstead Society.
- In 2013, grandson Ned Browning released a collection of men's and women's watches based on characters from the novel Rebecca, under the brand name du Maurier Watches.
- In the 2014 novel The House at the End of Hope Street, du Maurier is featured as one of the women who has lived in the titular house.
- The character of Bedelia Du Maurier in the television series Hannibal was named in part after du Maurier because its creator Bryan Fuller is a fan of Alfred Hitchcock, who had adapted three of du Maurier's books to film.
- Daphne du Maurier appears as a character in the short story "The Housekeeper" by Rose Tremain. The story imagines a lesbian affair between du Maurier and a Polish housekeeper, who is then fictionalised as Mrs Danvers in Rebecca.
- The 2024 novel The Mischief Makers by Elisabeth Gifford is inspired by du Maurier's relationships with Barrie and the Llewelyn Davies brothers.

== Works ==
=== Fiction ===
==== Novels ====
- The Loving Spirit (1931)
- I'll Never Be Young Again (1932)
- The Progress of Julius (1933) (later re-published as Julius)
- Jamaica Inn (1936)
- Rebecca (1938)
- Frenchman's Creek (1941)
- Hungry Hill (1943)
- The King's General (1946)
- The Parasites (1949)
- My Cousin Rachel (1951)
- Mary Anne (1954)
- The Scapegoat (1957)
- Castle Dor (1961) (with Sir Arthur Quiller-Couch)
- The Glass-Blowers (1963)
- The Flight of the Falcon (1965)
- The House on the Strand (1969)
- Rule Britannia (1972)

==== Plays ====
- Rebecca (1940) (du Maurier's stage adaptation of her novel)
- The Years Between (1945) (play)
- September Tide (1948) (play)

==== Short fiction ====
- "Happy Christmas" (1940)
- "The Breakthrough" (1966)

==== Short fiction collections ====
- The Apple Tree (1952); Kiss Me Again, Stranger (1953) in the US, with two additional stories
  reissue: The Birds and Other Stories (1963)
- Early Stories (1959), stories written between 1927 and 1930
- The Breaking Point (1959) a.k.a. The Blue Lenses
- Not After Midnight (1971); published as Don't Look Now in the US and later also in the UK
- The Rendezvous and Other Stories (1980), a selection from Early Stories (1959) and elsewhere
- Classics of the Macabre (1987), a collection of earlier stories, illustrated by Michael Foreman, also known as Echoes from the Macabre: Selected Stories
- Don't Look Now (2008), a new colleciton published by New York Review Books
- The Doll: The Lost Short Stories (2011), early short stories
- After Midnight: Thirteen Tales for the Dark Hours (2025), a collection of thirteen previously published short stories, with an introduction by Stephen King

=== Non-fiction ===
- Gerald: A Portrait (1934)
- The Du Mauriers (1937)
- "A Writer Is a Strange Creature," The Writer, (November 1938)
- Come Wind, Come Weather (1940), true stories of ordinary English people during the Second World War
- The Young George du Maurier: a selection of his letters 1860–67 (1951)
- The Infernal World of Branwell Brontë (1960)
- Vanishing Cornwall (1967), includes photographs by her son Christian
- Golden Lads: Sir Francis Bacon, Anthony Bacon and their Friends (1975)
- The Winding Stair: Francis Bacon, His Rise and Fall (1976)
- Growing Pains: The Shaping of a Writer (1977), also known as Myself When Young: The Shaping of a Writer
- The Rebecca Notebook and Other Memories (1980)
  This collection for the U.S. market combines the text of The Rendezvous and Other Stories (see above) with the Rebecca notebook of the title, other Rebecca-related material, a selection of autobiographical sketches, and four poems.
- Enchanted Cornwall (1989)

== See also ==
- The Queen's Book of the Red Cross
- Maroon beret – She was said to have chosen the colour which is now an international symbol of airborne forces; however, in a letter, kept by the British Airborne Assault Archive, she wrote that it was untrue.

== Further reading and other sources ==
- Du Maurier, Daphne. Mary Anne. London: Gollancz, 1954.
- Du Maurier, Daphne. Enchanted Cornwall: Her Pictorial Memoir. London, Michael Joseph, 1989.
- Forster, Margaret. Daphne du Maurier. London: Chatto & Windus, 1993. ISBN 978-0-70113-699-4
- Obituary in The Independent, 21 April 1989
- Kelly, Richard (1987). Daphne du Maurier. Boston: Twayne. ISBN 0-8057-6931-5.
- Dictionary of National Biography. London, Oxford University Press, 1887– : Du Maurier, Dame Daphne (1907–1989); Browning, Sir Frederick Arthur Montague (1896–1965); Frederick, Prince, Duke of York and Albany (1763–1827); Clarke, Mary Anne (1776?–1852).
- Rance, Nicholas. "Not Like Men in Books, Murdering Women: Daphne du Maurier and the Infernal World of Popular Fiction". In Clive Bloom (ed.), Creepers: British Horror and Fantasy in the Twentieth Century. London and Boulder, CO: Pluto Press, 1993. pp. 86–98.
