= Lessness (short story) =

Short story by Samuel Beckett

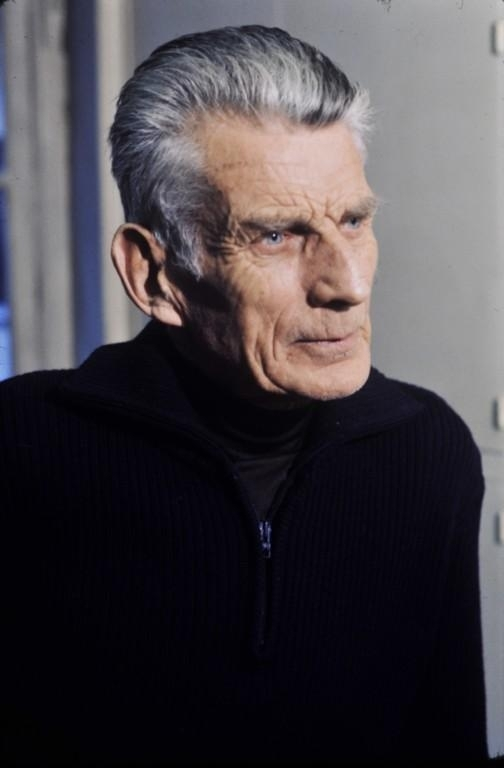
Samuel Beckett, 1977

"Lessness" is a short story by Samuel Beckett originally written in French as "Sans" in 1969, and later translated into English by the author. It was partly inspired by John Cage and the experimental music of the 1960s. The story was included in a book of short stories under the title Friendship launched in 1990 to coincide with the fourth anniversary of the kidnapping in Beirut of the British television journalist John McCarthy.

"Lessness" was written when Beckett wrote sixty sentences on different pieces of paper, put them in a box, and drew them out. He then repeated the process.
