= Kirby wire =

Device for stage performers

A Kirby wire is a pendulum-based flying system used by stage performers. The system was invented by George Kirby in 1898, and utilizes a quick-release mechanism for safety. The Kirby family made other innovations in theatrical flight including the somersault wire and a system that allowed an actor to be flown to the stage above the audience.
