= Streetwise Opera =

UK charity

- Founded: 2002
- Founder: Matt Peacock
- Type: Non-governmental & nonprofit organisation
- Registration no.: England and Wales: 1092931
- Headquarters: 35-47 Bethnal Grn Rd, London E1 6LA
- Region served: London; Manchester; Nottingham
- Key people: Rachael Williams (Chief Executive)
- Revenue: £662,822 (2022)
- Website: streetwiseopera.org

Streetwise Opera (stylised as STREETWISE OPERÅÅÅ) is a charitable opera non-profit organisation based in London and covering Manchester and Nottingham in addition to London. It is registered as a charity in England and Wales, and was founded in 2002 by Matt Peacock, an opera critic and homeless shelter volunteer, with the intent of giving homeless or formerly homeless people the opportunity to perform opera.

The company ran in April 1923 the 'Re:sound' festival, where around 100 people with experience of homelessness performed alongside the BBC Concert Orchestra and The Sixteen choir at the Queen Elizabeth Hall, with graphics from theatre company 1927. The company performed their own opera The Answer to Everything, which included filmed elements, at the BFI Southbank in 2013.
