= The Mugger =

The Mugger may refer to:

- The Mugger (novel), a 1956 novel by Ed McBain
- The Mugger (film), a 1958 American film noir-crime film based on the novel

== See also ==
- Mugging (disambiguation)
