= Don Macpherson =

British screenwriter

Don Macpherson (born 7 September 1954) is a British screenwriter working in films and television.

== Biography ==
Macpherson was born in Durham, and educated at Nottingham High School and Queens' College, Cambridge, where he was awarded an Exhibition to read English.

== Journalism ==
After working at The Other Cinema, he became a journalist for Screen International then joined Time Out as a film critic. He was part of a group that set up City Limits magazine, then wrote features for The Face and The Sunday Times. During this period, he worked for BBC TV's Arena on It's All True for producer Alan Yentob and director Julien Temple.

== Films ==
His first solo credit was a BBC TV classic serial The Dark Angel (1989) with Peter O'Toole, Jane Lapotaire and Beatie Edney, an adaptation of Sheridan Le Fanu's gothic novel Uncle Silas, shown on PBS's Masterpiece Theatre. For producer Stephen Woolley an adaptation of William McIlvanney's novel The Big Man (1990) followed, starring Liam Neeson, Billy Connolly and Joanne Whalley. His original script Jonathan Wild became a project for Neil Jordan, and was bought by Jodie Foster for her company Egg Productions. This cult script led to work at Warner Bros., on projects such as Tale of Two Cities for Terry Gilliam and Frankenstein for Tim Burton, following rewrite work on David Fincher's Alien 3 (1992) with Sigourney Weaver. His adaptation of a Cornell Woolrich story The Black Bargain (1995) starring Miguel Ferrer and Peter Berg was directed by Keith Gordon for the US pay TV channel Showtime.

Work followed in credited and uncredited scripts for films such as Hippie Hippie Shake (2009) with Cillian Murphy and Sienna Miller, Possession (2002) with Gwyneth Paltrow, The Avengers (1998) with Ralph Fiennes and Uma Thurman, Godzilla (1998) with Matthew Broderick, Entrapment (1998) with Sean Connery and Catherine Zeta-Jones, and Pedro Almodóvar's Live Flesh (1997) with Javier Bardem and Penélope Cruz. Scripts in development included adaptations of Evan Hunter's mafia thriller Criminal Conversation for Tom Cruise, the sci fi novel Spares for Steven Spielberg, and a version of Ayn Rand's classic The Fountainhead for Oliver Stone.

Recently he completed scripts including an adaptation of Graham Greene's West Africa novel The Heart of the Matter for Martin Scorsese and producer Barbara de Fina, a version of Greene's Brighton Rock for Terrence Malick, and Beijing Project, a contemporary thriller for John Woo. A script for Chinese director Li Shaohong, The Legend of the Green Dragon Sword, is also in development for Beijing's Rosat Films.

Current TV projects include an epic 8 part series on The Third Crusade, in collaboration with US writer Kario Salem for HBO/Company Pictures.
