= Last Summer =

Last Summer or The Last Summer can refer to:

== Books ==
- Last Summer (novel), a 1968 novel by Evan Hunter
- The Last Summer (novella), a 1934 novella by Boris Pasternak
- The Last Summer, a 1969 novel by Iain Crichton Smith
- The Last Summer (of You and Me), a 2007 novel by Ann Brashares

== Films ==
- Last Summer (1969 film), an American drama film based on the Evan Hunter novel
- Last Summer (2021 film), a Turkish romantic drama film
- Last Summer (2023 film), a French erotic drama film
- Dernier Été (Last Summer), 1981 French film directed by Robert Guédiguian and Frank Le Wita
- The Last Summer (1954 film), a West German drama film
- The Last Summer (1974 film), a Bulgarian drama film
- The Last Summer (2019 film), an American romantic comedy film

== Music ==
- "I Somras (Last Summer)", Swedish-language suite by Wilhelm Peterson-Berger (1867–1942)

=== Albums ===
- Last Summer (album), an album by Eleanor Friedberger
- The Last Summer, album by LO-FI-FNK
- The Last Summer, 2019 album by R Plus (Rollo Armstrong)
- The Last Summer, an alternative name for Live: The Last Summer, album by the Siegel–Schwall Band

=== Songs ===
- "Last Summer" (song), a 2004 song by Lostprophets
- "Last Summer", 1978 song by Rod Stewart from Blondes Have More Fun
- "Last Summer", 2006 song by Miliyah Kato from Diamond Princess
- "Last Summer", 2014 song by David Gray from Mutineers
- "Last Summer", 2018 song by Felix Jaehn, featuring Troi Irons, from I
- "Last Summer", 2018 song by Johnny Orlando from Teenage Fever
- "Last Summer", 2021 song by Zara Larsson from Poster Girl

== Television ==
- Last Summer (TV series), a 2025 South Korean series
