= 1969 New York Film Critics Circle Awards =

35th New York Film Critics Circle Awards

35th New York Film Critics Circle Awards

January 25, 1970
(announced December 29, 1969)

Best Picture:
Z

The 35th New York Film Critics Circle Awards, honored the best filmmaking of 1969.

== Winners ==
- Best Actor:
  - Jon Voight - Midnight Cowboy
  - Runners-up: Dustin Hoffman - Midnight Cowboy and Robert Redford - Downhill Racer
- Best Actress:
  - Jane Fonda - They Shoot Horses, Don't They?
  - Runners-up: Vanessa Redgrave - Isadora and Maggie Smith - The Prime of Miss Jean Brodie
- Best Director:
  - Costa-Gavras - Z
  - Runners-up: Richard Attenborough - Oh! What a Lovely War and Luchino Visconti - The Damned (La caduta degli dei)
- Best Film:
  - Z
  - Runners-up: Oh! What a Lovely War and The Damned (La caduta degli dei)
- Best Screenplay:
  - Paul Mazursky and Larry Tucker - Bob & Carol & Ted & Alice
  - Runners-up: François Truffaut, Claude de Givray and Bernard Revon - Stolen Kisses (Baisers volés) and Luchino Visconti, Enrico Medioli and Nicola Badalucco - The Damned (La caduta degli dei)
- Best Supporting Actor:
  - Jack Nicholson - Easy Rider
  - Runner-up: Elliott Gould - Bob & Carol & Ted & Alice
- Best Supporting Actress:
  - Dyan Cannon - Bob & Carol & Ted & Alice
  - Runners-up: Catherine Burns - Last Summer and Delphine Seyrig - Stolen Kisses (Baisers volés)
