= MUG =

MUG may refer to:

- Macintosh User Group
- Marxist Unity Group, an Orthodox Marxist caucus within the Democratic Socialists of America.
- MUMPS User Group
- Meet-up game, a term for pick-up game
- Multi-User Game, another term for multiplayer video game
- 4-methylumbelliferyl-beta-D-glucuronide, a substrate used in the GUS reporter system
- Double-stranded uracil-DNA glycosylase, an enzyme
- The Medical University of Gdańsk in Poland
- Male Un-bifurcated Garment, a technical term for men's skirts
- IATA airport code for Mulegé Airstrip, near Mulegé, Baja California Sur, Mexico
- Mug Root Beer, sometimes referred to as MUG

== See also ==
- Mug (disambiguation)
- Mugging (disambiguation)
