= Mean Mug =

Mean Mug may refer to:

- "Mean Mug", a song by Soulja Boy from The DeAndre Way (2010)
- "Mean Mug", a song by Ari Lennox from Age/Sex/Location (2022)

== See also ==
- Mean (disambiguation)
- Mug (disambiguation)
