= Mugging (disambiguation) =

Mugging is a type of street robbery.

Mugging or mugger or close variants thereof may also refer to:

== Media ==
=== Books ===
- Mugged: Racial Demagoguery from the Seventies to Obama, a 2012 book by Ann Coulter
- The Mugger (novel), a 1956 novel by Ed McBain

=== Film ===
- The Mugger (film), 1958 American film noir-crime film
- Muggers (film), a 2000 Australian movie directed by Dean Murphy

=== Television ===
- "Mugged" (Flight of the Conchords), a 2007 episode
- "Mugging" (Not Going Out), a 2014 episode
- "Mugging" (Peep Show), a 2005 episode

== Slang terms ==
- Mugging, a slang term for overacting
- Mugging, a disparaging term for rote learning
  - Mugging, a Singapore colloquial term for intensive studying

== Other uses ==
- Mugger, a footpad (an archaic term for a robber or thief specializing in pedestrian victims)
- Mugger crocodile, a species native to India, Iran, Nepal, and Pakistan

== See also ==
- Mug (disambiguation)
