= Cop Hater (film) =

1958 film

- Theatrical release poster
- Directed by: William Berke
- Screenplay by: Henry Kane
- Based on: Ed McBain's novel "Cop Hater"
- Produced by: William Berke
- Starring: Robert Loggia; Gerald O'Loughlin; Ellen Parker; Shirley Ballard
- Cinematography: J. Burgi Contner, A.S.C.
- Edited by: Everett Sutherland
- Music by: Albert Glasser
- Production company: Barbizon Productions Inc.
- Distributed by: United Artists
- Release date: October 1, 1958
- Running time: 75 minutes
- Country: United States
- Language: English

Cop Hater is a 1958 American crime film noir police procedural film based on the 1956 novel Cop Hater written by Ed McBain, the first in a series of books about the 87th Precinct in New York City. The film was produced and directed by William Berke, written by Henry Kane and stars Robert Loggia and Gerald O'Loughlin.

== Plot ==
During an intense summer heat wave in New York City, two cops are murdered and the detectives of the 87th Precinct must find the killer. Steve Carella and Mike Maguire are the lead investigators on the case, but they cannot make any progress and their work is hampered by the interference of reporter Hank Miller. The two cops try to keep their personal lives separate from their work to no avail. When Maguire is shot and killed, Carella must comfort his partner's wife Alice and then gets drunk with Hank, inadvertently revealing his suspicions about the case and placing his girlfriend Teddy, a deaf-mute author, in jeopardy. When a hood arrives at Teddy's apartment, Carella overpowers him and forces a confession. The man killed all of the cops but Maguire had been the intended victim all along, as his wife had wanted him eliminated.

== Cast ==
- Robert Loggia as Detective Carelli
- Gerald O'Loughlin as Detective Maguire
- Ellen Parker as Carelli's Girl—Teddy
- Shirley Ballard as Maguire's Wife—Alice
- Russell Hardie as Detective Lt. Byrnes
- Hal Riddle as Cop Hater—Killer
- William Neff as Rookie Cop—Kling
- Gene Miller as Reporter Miller
- Vince Gardenia as Danny the Gimp
- John Gerstad as Laboratory Technician
- Ralph Stantley as Detective Willis
- Glen Gannon as Gang Leader—Rip
- Alan Manson as Newlywed Clark
- Sandra Stevens as Newlywed Wife
- Jan Kalionzes as Officer Reardon's Wife
- Jerry Orbach as Gang Leader—Mumzer
- Frank Dana as Young Hoodlum
- Ted Gunther as Detective Haviland
- Lincoln Kilpatrick as Detective Foster
- Miriam Goldina as Mama Lucy
- Thomas Nello as Ex-Con Ortiz
- Kate Harkin as Ortiz's Wife
- Alan Bergnan as Police Officer Reardon
- Lulu King as Detective Foster's Mother
- Terry Green as Boy in Lineup
- Steve Franken as Boy in Lineup

== Reception ==
In a contemporary review for The New York Times, critic Howard Thompson wrote:

The most effective thing about this rather routine, makeshift little melodrama is the abundance of comparatively fresh faces. In this respectably low-budget entry, filmed locally, the flavor, drive and tension of Ed McBain's crackling detective novel are all but gone. Henry Kane, the scenarist, tries to mirror the atmosphere of a metropolitan precinct headquarters, but the inept direction of William Berke, who also produced, synthetically flattens the plot, even with its original jolting denouement. Robert Loggia, Gerald O'Loughlin, Shirley Ballard and the others, excluding Russell Hardie, are quite self-conscious, for some reason. Hence so is the picture itself.
