= Mug (disambiguation) =

A mug is a large cup with a handle.

Mug or mugs may also refer to:

== Arts, entertainment, and media ==
- Mug (film), a 2018 Polish film
- Mug EP, by the band Creaming Jesus
- Mr. Mugs, a main character in a series of children's books by Martha Kambeitz and Carol Roth

== Legends and mythology ==
- Mug Corb, a legendary High King of Ireland
- Mug Nuadat, in Irish mythology a king of Munster
- Mug Ruith, in Irish mythology a powerful blind druid

== Law enforcement ==
- Mug book, a collection of photographs of criminals, typically mugshots
- Mug shot, a photographic portrait of a person from the waist up, typically taken after a person is arrested

== Other uses ==
- Mug, an American slang term for the face
- Mug, British slang term for cuckold e.g., as used in Parade's End
- Metric slug, or Mug a unit of mass
- Mug Root Beer, a beverage brand

== See also ==
- MUG (disambiguation)
- "Mugged" (Flight of the Conchords), the third episode of the TV series Flight of the Conchords
- Mugging (disambiguation)
