= Sloan Simpson =

American fashion consultant

- Born: Elizabeth Laurenson Simpson; October 18, 1916
- Died: November 22, 1996 (aged 80)

Elizabeth Laurenson Simpson (October 18, 1916 – 1996), better known as Sloan Simpson, (later adopting Sloane as her surname) was a fashion consultant, television and radio personality, fashion model, and actor. Simpson served as First Lady of New York City during the mayoralty of William O'Dwyer.

== Early life and education ==
Simpson was born to Eleanora Laurenson Myer Simpson and William Sloan Simpson (known as Sloan) in Dallas, Texas on October 18, 1916. Called "Betty" during her childhood, she grew up in Highland Park, Texas, a town in the Dallas suburbs. Sloan Simpson, a lieutenant-colonel in the U.S. Army, served with President Theodore Roosevelt's Rough Riders during the Spanish–American War. He participated in the Battle of San Juan Hill. Simpson's grandfather, John R. Simpson, founded the Exchange Bank, which became the First National Bank of Texas.

During her childhood, Simpson studied at the Sacred Heart Convent in the Torresdale neighborhood of Philadelphia, Pennsylvania, and the Beard School (now Morristown-Beard School) in Orange, New Jersey. She graduated from Highland Park High School in University Park, Texas. Simpson then completed her undergraduate studies at Stephens College in Columbia, Missouri.

== Radio, TV, and film ==
Simpson worked as a TV and radio personality. In December 1953, she began hosting a radio program titled The Sloan Simpson Show on WOR, a radio station in New York City. The 25-minute talk show, which aired on weekday evenings at 9:05 pm, discussed fashion, current events, and celebrity gossip. The show aired nationally on the Mutual Broadcasting System, a national radio network, from 1954–1955. Simpson's TV show with the same name, which ran on WOR-TV, began in January 1954. WOR-TV canceled the show in April of that year. Simpson also made guest appearances on other TV programs, including Leave It to the Girls (a talk show), Let's Take Sides (a debate show), and One Minute Please (a quiz show).

During the late 1950s and early 1960s, Simpson starred in roles in film and on TV. She played the character Harriet Byrne in the 1960 movie The Pusher. Simpson also made guest appearances on The Phil Silvers Show on CBS-TV and Naked City on ABC-TV.

== Fashion industry and tours ==
After working as a fashion model for the John Powers agency, Simpson served as a fashion coordinator for Stern's, a regional chain of department stores in New York, Pennsylvania, and New Jersey. She then served as a fashion consultant for the Flemington Fur Company. Simpson supervised the company's fashion shows in New York, New Jersey, and Pennsylvania.

In 1960, Simpson moved from the U.S. to Acapulco, a coastal city in Mexico near the Pacific Ocean. She worked as a clerk in a hotel dress shop. Simpson then served as a correspondent for Women's Wear Daily, a fashion magazine, and she worked as a tour representative for Braniff International Airways. Known by the community as the "First Lady of Acapulco", Simpson also ran a boutique.

== 1956 Manhattan robbery ==
In February 1956, burglars broke into Simpson's three-room apartment on East 52nd Street in Manhattan. The burglars stole jewelry valued at $5,000, which included diamond earrings and bracelets. Their break-in occurred during a trip by Simpson to visit to her mother in New Hope, Pennsylvania.

== Personal life and family ==
Simpson married Carroll Dewey Hipp on November 10, 1938. Having divorced Hipp, on September 23, 1943; she married New York City mayor William O'Dwyer on December 20, 1949. O'Dwyer's aides received 250 telegrams of congratulation on the couple's wedding day, including one from his friend, President Harry Truman. Sent from Air Force One, Truman's telegram read, "Hearty greetings to you and to the woman of your choice and best wishes for long years of happiness."

Following his 1949 re-election, O'Dwyer was confronted with a police corruption scandal uncovered by Kings County District Attorney Miles McDonald. Truman appointed O'Dwyer as the U.S. Ambassador to Mexico. O'Dwyer resigned, and was given a ticker tape parade along Broadway's Canyon of Heroes in Manhattan, and the couple relocated to Acapulco, returning, briefly, in 1951, to appear before the Kefauver Committee.

Simpson and O'Dwyer divorced in 1953. Following her divorce from O'Dwyer, Simpson had a well-publicized affair with Mario Rivas, the married owner of hotels in Mexico City and Acapulco, which was then publicized by True Magazine.
