= The Pusher (film) =

1960 film by Gene Milford

- Theatrical release poster
- Directed by: Gene Milford
- Screenplay by: Harold Robbins
- Based on: The Pusher by Ed McBain
- Produced by: Sidney Katz; Gene Milford
- Starring: Kathy Carlyle; Robert Lansing; Felice Orlandi; Douglas Rodgers; Sloan Simpson
- Cinematography: Arthur J. Ornitz
- Edited by: Sidney Katz
- Music by: Raymond Scott
- Production company: Milford/Carlyle Productions
- Distributed by: United Artists
- Release date: 1960
- Running time: 81 minutes
- Country: United States
- Language: English

The Pusher is a 1960 American crime film directed and co-produced by Gene Milford. The screenplay—based on Ed McBain's novel of the same name, from his 87th Precinct series—was written by Harold Robbins. The film stars Kathy Carlyle, Robert Lansing, Felice Orlandi, Douglas Rodgers and Sloan Simpson. The film was produced in 1958, and released by United Artists in 1960.

== Plot ==
A detective investigating the murder of a heroin addict discovers that there is a connection between the junkie and his fiance, who is his boss' daughter.

== Cast ==
- Kathy Carlyle as Laura
- Robert Lansing as Steve Carella
- Felice Orlandi as The Pusher
- Douglas Rodgers as Lt. Peter Byrne
- Sloan Simpson as Harriet Byrne
- Sara Amman as María Hernández
- Jim Boles as Newspaper vendor
- John Astin as Detective
- Beatrice Pons as Mrs. Hernandez
- Ernesto Gonzales as Ernesto
- John Fostini as Harry
- David Ford as Detective Kling
- William Doerner as Patrolman Genero
- Antonio Obregon as Shoeshine boy
- Jeno Mate as Bartender
- Lee Jones as Young man
- Donna Maran as Gert
- Joanna Merlin as Shoeshine boy's mother

== Production ==
Many of the street location scenes were filmed in New York City (Manhattan and the Bronx).
