= Cop Hater =

1956 novel by Ed McBain

- Author: Evan Hunter (as Ed McBain)
- Language: English
- Series: 87th Precinct #1
- Genre: Police procedural
- Publisher: Permabooks
- Publication date: 1956
- Publication place: United States
- Media type: Print (Paperback)
- Pages: 166 pages/ revised Edition 236 pages
- OCLC: 8478204
- Followed by: The Mugger

Cop Hater (1956) is the first 87th Precinct police procedural novel by Ed McBain. The murder of three detectives in quick succession in the 87th Precinct leads Detective Steve Carella on a search that takes him into the city's underworld and ultimately to a .45 automatic aimed straight at his head.

Written by Evan Hunter using the name Ed McBain, the book was inspired by a television show he greatly admired, Dragnet. McBain chose to set his 87th Precinct series in the fictional city of Isola, based on New York City. In 1958 it was made into a film of the same name. In 1961, NBC developed an hour-long TV series 87th Precinct. McBain's work inspired many other writers and television producers to further develop the police procedural genre. Most notably, in 1981 Steven Bochco produced the award-winning Hill Street Blues for NBC. Bochco set his gritty police drama in a precinct house in a fictional city much as McBain did in Cop Hater. Apparently, Evan Hunter was unhappy with the similarity but he was reminded of his own borrowing of his predecessor's ideas.

== Plot summary ==
The city has surrendered to a heat wave in July 1956. When detective Mike Reardon is on the way to work on the nightshift, he is murdered from behind with a .45 caliber handgun. As Steve Carella and his colleagues from the 87th Precinct are looking for their friend's killer, they have no idea that this is just the beginning of a series of police murders.

David Foster is the next victim, at the entrance of his apartment, where the killer has left behind a footprint at the crime scene. Steve Carella and Hank Bush question the family and wives of the deceased, as well as some suspects, but to no avail. A few nights later the unknown killer ambushes and murders Det. Hank Bush. Bush fought back however and shot and wounded the murderer. Steve Carella fears he will be the next target if he fails to stop him.

When Carella is leaving the precinct, he finds a reporter, Savage, waiting for him. He asks Carella his thoughts on who the killer might be, stating that everything is off the record. Carella reveals that - due to the evidence collected from Bush's murder - the police now knows certain attributes of the killer, i.e. weight, profession, and build. Carella leaves telling Savage that he is going on a date with his girlfriend, Teddy. The next day we find out that Savage has published the conversation between him and Carella, including Teddy's name and address.

When Carella finds this out he rushes to Teddy's apartment, hoping the killer is not already there. When Carella arrives at Teddy's apartment he hears shouting and cursing coming from inside. With his .38 in hand, Carella enters Teddy's room and is immediately faced with a man aiming a .45 right at him. Carella drops to the floor the instant he enters the room and shoots the man holding the .45 twice in the thigh. After making sure Teddy is okay, Carella interrogates the man, finding out that his name is Paul Mercer and that he was the murderer of all three cops.

After further interrogation it is discovered that Alice Bush was behind the whole plot; she had convinced a previously unknown man named Paul Mercer to commit the murders. Apparently she had promised him her affections once he had killed off her husband. In the end, both are sentenced to death for their crimes and Det. Carella marries his girlfriend, Teddy Franklin.

== Character list ==
In order of appearance

- Det. Mike Reardon, first victim, shot twice in the back of the head
- Det. Stephen Louis Carella, protagonist
- Det. Hank Bush, third detective to be murdered
- Det. David Foster, only black detective, Mike's partner, second victim,
- Lieutenant Byrnes, in charge of 87th detective squad
- Frank Clarke, first suspect of shootings
- Thomas Perillo
- Alice Bush, wife of Det. Bush
- Teddy Franklin, girlfriend of Det. Carella, deaf
- Danny Gimp, police informant
- Harry, bartender at The Shamrock
- Cliff Savage, a newspaper reporter
- Bert Kling, patrolman who was shot at a bar on Culver by a member of The Grovers
- David Brockin, suspect of detective shootings
- Captain Frick, commanding officer of the 87th precinct
- Det. Roger Havilland
- Oretha Bailey, woman who told Carella the cockroach-men were responsible for the murders
- Det. Hal Willis, relatively small detective, Judo expert
- Paul Mercer, murderer

== Critical reception ==
The New York Times called the book "a tough, sexy novel with inherent honesty and decency."
