= Lightning (Hunter novel) =

1984 novel by Evan Hunter

- Author: Evan Hunter
- Language: English
- Genre: Police procedural
- Publisher: Arbor House
- Publication date: August 1, 1984
- Publication place: United States
- Pages: 243
- ISBN: 9780241113721

Lightning is a 1984 police procedural novel by American author Evan Hunter, first published by Arbor House. The novel is part of the 87th Precinct series, written under the pseudonym of Ed McBain. It follows the detectives of the fictional city of Isola, roughly equivalent to New York City, as they investigate two simultaneous cases; one of repeated rape, the other of murder. It received generally positive reviews from critics at the time of release.

== Plot ==
Lightning follows the detectives of the 87th precinct in Isola, a fictional city roughly equivalent to New York City. The recurring cast of roughly six detectives are joined by Detective Oliver Weeks, known as "Fat Ollie". They are investigating two cases of recurring crimes; the first is a serial rapist who is repeatedly targeting the same several women, seemingly on a fixed schedule but random among those chosen. The other is a serial killer who is targeting female athletes, leaving their corpses strung up on a lamppost. They investigate both cases, and believe that the two cases may be connected, despite the different actions taken by the criminals.

== Publication history ==
Lightning was first published by Arbor House on August 1, 1984. Evan Hunter released the title under the pseudonym of Ed McBain, which he used for the 87th Precinct series.

== Reception ==
Lightning received generally positive reviews. It was seen as another example of high-quality police procedural work from Hunter, although the Houston Chronicle's Jay Brandon considered the investigations to be almost too detailed. The dialogue and characters were also well received, with particular praise for the character of Fat Ollie, who was seen as a very atypical hero for the police stories within the genre. The Arizona Daily Star's Joe McDermott wrote that the true identify of the criminals, a seemingly normal businessman and school principal, helped sell the danger of the story, as well as the other ways in which Hunter showcased the abuse people faced in their lives, men and women.

Although noting that the continuity of the 87th Precinct series was very long, Brandon did not consider it to be an issue for reading the book standalone. The humor to lighten up the grim plot was generally well received; however, the Chicago Tribune's Clarence Petersen wrote that he usually considered Hunter's prose and humor to detract from the procedural, in this case Lightning was good enough that he would recommend it despite that. The Philadelphia Inquirer's Andy Wickstrom wrote that Hunter's novels were "the work of a pro", praising the use of visual elements such as police reports and charts inserted into the prose. He did consider the novels to be somewhat formulaic and unambitious, but still recommended. Kirkus Reviews wrote that it was "sturdy reading for the procedural audience", but criticized the use of unrealistic cases of insanity that served as the criminal's motivations, as well as the "excess of cutesy/sit-com padding" of the detective's personal lives outside of the case.
