= The Birds and Other Stories =

1952 short stories by Daphne du Maurier

- The 1952 first UK edition under its original title, The Apple Tree
- Author: Daphne du Maurier
- Original title: The Apple Tree
- Cover artist: Val Biro
- Language: English
- Publisher: Gollancz
- Publication date: 1952
- Publication place: United Kingdom
- Media type: Hardback
- Pages: 264
- OCLC: 1278358

The Birds and Other Stories is a collection of stories by the British author Daphne du Maurier. It was originally published by Gollancz in the United Kingdom in 1952 as The Apple Tree: A Short Novel and Several Long Stories, and was re-issued by Penguin in 1963 under the current title. In the United States an expanded version was published in 1953 under the title Kiss Me Again, Stranger: A Collection of Eight Stories, Long and Short by Doubleday including two additional stories, "The Split Second" and "No Motive".

One of the stories, "The Birds", was made into a film of the same name by Alfred Hitchcock in 1963.

== Stories ==
As first published under the title The Apple Tree in 1952:

- "Monte Verità" tells of an isolated mountain, home to a mysterious sect rumoured to be immortal and feared by the local communities from whom it attracts young women who are never heard of again. It is told from the viewpoint of a nameless mountaineer whose best friend's wife disappears on a trip to climb the peak.
- "The Birds" is a horror story in which a Cornish farmhand, his family, and his community are attacked by flocks of birds.
- "The Apple Tree" follows the actions of a man who, following the death of his unloved wife, suspects her spirit inhabits an old apple tree in his garden. He eventually cuts it down, with tragic consequence.
- "The Little Photographer" tells of a rich Marquise bored and dissatisfied with her life who attempts to spice up her life by having an affair with a photographer whilst holidaying on the French Mediterranean coast.
- "Kiss Me Again, Stranger" relates an episode in which a shy mechanic follows a cinema usherette home from work, and is led to a cemetery. Only later does the mechanic discover the terrible truth about her.
- "The Old Man" follows a family history as told by a neighbour who suspects the father of killing one of their children.

== Reception ==
Reviewing the American edition in the May 1953 edition of The Magazine of Fantasy & Science Fiction, Boucher and McComas noted that while nearly half the work fell into the fantasy genre, some bordering on science fiction, the stories were "largely overlong and not too original."

== Adaptations ==
- "The Birds" has been the subject of many adaptations, including the 1963 Alfred Hitchcock film of the same name.
- "Kiss Me Again, Stranger" was adapted for CBS television in 1953.
- A BBC radio 4 adaptation of The Apple Tree starring Charles Gray was produced in 1974.
