= Lux Summer Theatre =

1953 radio summer series

- Genre: Radio programs
- Running time: 1 hour
- Country of origin: United States
- Home station: CBS Radio
- Announcer: Ken Carpenter, Don Wilson
- Directed by: Norman Macdonnell
- Produced by: Norman Macdonnell
- Original release: June 1 – August 31, 1953
- No. of series: 1
- No. of episodes: 14
- Audio format: mono

Lux Summer Theatre is a CBS Radio (Columbia Broadcasting System) anthology series which ran during the summer of 1953 in the Lux Radio Theatre's regular one-hour timeslot. Fourteen episodes aired from June through August of that year.

This weekly series differed from its parent show in several ways, starting with it being the first version of Lux Radio Theatre since 1936 to air during the summer. Norman Macdonnell was brought in from the Gunsmoke radio series to take on the job of director-producer. Ken Carpenter continued as the show's announcer, with Don Wilson filling in for him when on vacation. This summer series had a significantly smaller budget than its parent show, with each episode budgeted at $4250 (by contrast, when Lux Radio Theatre aired its first show from Hollywood in 1936 that show's budget was a reported $17,000). Because of the budget constraints, only a single major star headed-up each episode of the summer series.

Another difference involved the source materials which were used for the series. While about half of the shows were still the traditional movie adaptations, the series also presented several original scripts, with three of them written by Kathleen Hite. In addition, one program was an adaptation of Daphne du Maurier's horror story "The Birds".

As with its parent show, the series was broadcast live, but this series was a CBS studio broadcast in Studio A, as opposed to its having previously been performed in the CBS Radio Playhouse theater on Vine Street in Hollywood.

== List of summer 1953 episodes ==
First broadcast	Title	Starring	Citations and notes
1953-06-01	High Tor	William Holden	
1953-06-08	China Run	Virginia Mayo	
1953-06-15	The Lady and the Tumblers	Fred MacMurray	
1953-06-22	The Fall of Maggie Phillips	Dorothy McGuire	Scripted by Kathleen Hite
1953-06-29	One More Spring	Jeanne Crain	
1953-07-06	Cynara	Joseph Cotten	
1953-07-13	Physician in Spite of Himself	Robert Young	
1953-07-20	The Birds	Herbert Marshall	
1953-07-27	One Foot in Heaven	Dana Andrews	
1953-08-03	Romance, to a Degree	Joseph Cotten	Scripted by Kathleen Hite
1953-08-10	Leave Her to Heaven	Joan Fontaine	
1953-08-17	Edward, My Son	Walter Pidgeon	
1953-08-24	The Affairs of Susan	Anne Baxter	
1953-08-31	One Last September	Claire Trevor	Scripted by Kathleen Hite
