= Killer's Payoff =

1958 novel by Evan Hunter

- First edition
- Author: Evan Hunter (as Ed McBain)
- Cover artist: Robert Schulz
- Language: English
- Series: 87th Precinct #6
- Genre: Crime novel
- Publisher: Permabooks
- Publication date: 1958
- Publication place: United States
- Media type: Print (Paperback)
- Pages: 160 pages

Killer's Payoff (1958) is the sixth 87th Precinct novel by Ed McBain.

== Plot ==
Sy Kramer, a blackmailer, is shot dead in a 1937-style drive-by execution. But it is 1958 and Cotton Hawes and Steve Carella have to find out who killed him. It could have been Lucy Mencken, a rich and respectable lady with a past that included some very unrespectable photographic portraits, or it could have been Edward Schlesser, a manufacturer of soda pop. Or perhaps it was one of the members of a hunting party that went very wrong.

== Characters ==
This novel is the second to feature the character of Detective Cotton Hawes, newly transferred from the 30th Precinct, an area with 'Big, fancy apartment houses with doormen...But not many homicides.'
