= Me and Hitch =

- Author: Evan Hunter
- Language: English
- Genre: Autobiography
- Publisher: Faber and Faber Limited
- Publication date: 1997
- Publication place: United States
- Media type: Print (Paperback)
- Pages: 91 pages
- ISBN: 0571193064

Me and Hitch is a 1997 book that chronicles the relationship between writer Evan Hunter and director Alfred Hitchcock, beginning with their meeting in the summer of 1959 through April 1963. It focuses upon their successful collaboration on The Birds, and their ill-fated collaboration on Marnie.

Prior to their initial meeting, Hunter was approached by a Hitchcock representative from Shamley Productions because they were interested in purchasing one of his short stories, Vicious Cycle, to adapt for the popular Alfred Hitchcock Presents television program. The teleplay was written by Bernard Schoenfeld and it was directed by Paul Henreid. It aired in April 1957. Later in 1959, Hitchcock's production company called on Hunter to adapt a story called "Appointment at Eleven", originally written by Robert Turner. After its initial screening, Hunter and Hitchcock met for the first time.

Two years later, in September 1961, Hitchcock asked Hunter to write the screenplay for The Birds. The remainder of the book details not only their working relationship, but also the friendship that developed as well as the mutual respect they had for one another.
