= On the Sidewalk, Bleeding =

"On The Sidewalk, Bleeding"
- Short story by Evan Hunter
- Country: United States
- Language: English
- Genres: Tragedy, short story

Publication
- Published in: Manhunt (1st release)
- Publication type: Periodical
- Media type: Print (Magazine)
- Publication date: 1957

On the Sidewalk, Bleeding is a short story by an American author Ed McBain, also known as Evan Hunter. The story was first published in Manhunt magazine in July 1957. Its protagonist, a sixteen-year-old boy named Andy, bleeds to death on the sidewalk after being stabbed below the ribs by a member of a rival gang. The story is commonly used as teaching material in elementary schools, high schools and colleges. According to Evan Hunter, this was one of his most anthologized stories, together with First Offence and The Last Spin.

== Summary ==
Andy, a teenage member of the Royals gang, is stabbed in an alley by members of the Guardians, a rival gang. Over the course of a rainy night, Andy, left bleeding and alone on the sidewalk, reflects on his life choices and the consequences of his gang affiliation. Wearing his purple Royals jacket, Andy realizes that it has defined his identity in the eyes of others, overshadowing his true self. As he lies there, several passersby notice him but choose not to help, either out of fear, prejudice, or a desire to avoid getting tangled up in someone else's mess, no matter how dire the situation may be.

As time passes, Andy's desperation grows, and he comes to regret his decision to join the gang. He longs for a chance to live a life free from labels and violence. In his final moments, he removes his jacket and clings to the hope that someone will see him for who he truly is, not just as a member of the Royals.

Eventually, Andy's girlfriend finds him, but by then, it's too late.
