= The Birds (film) =

1963 film by Alfred Hitchcock

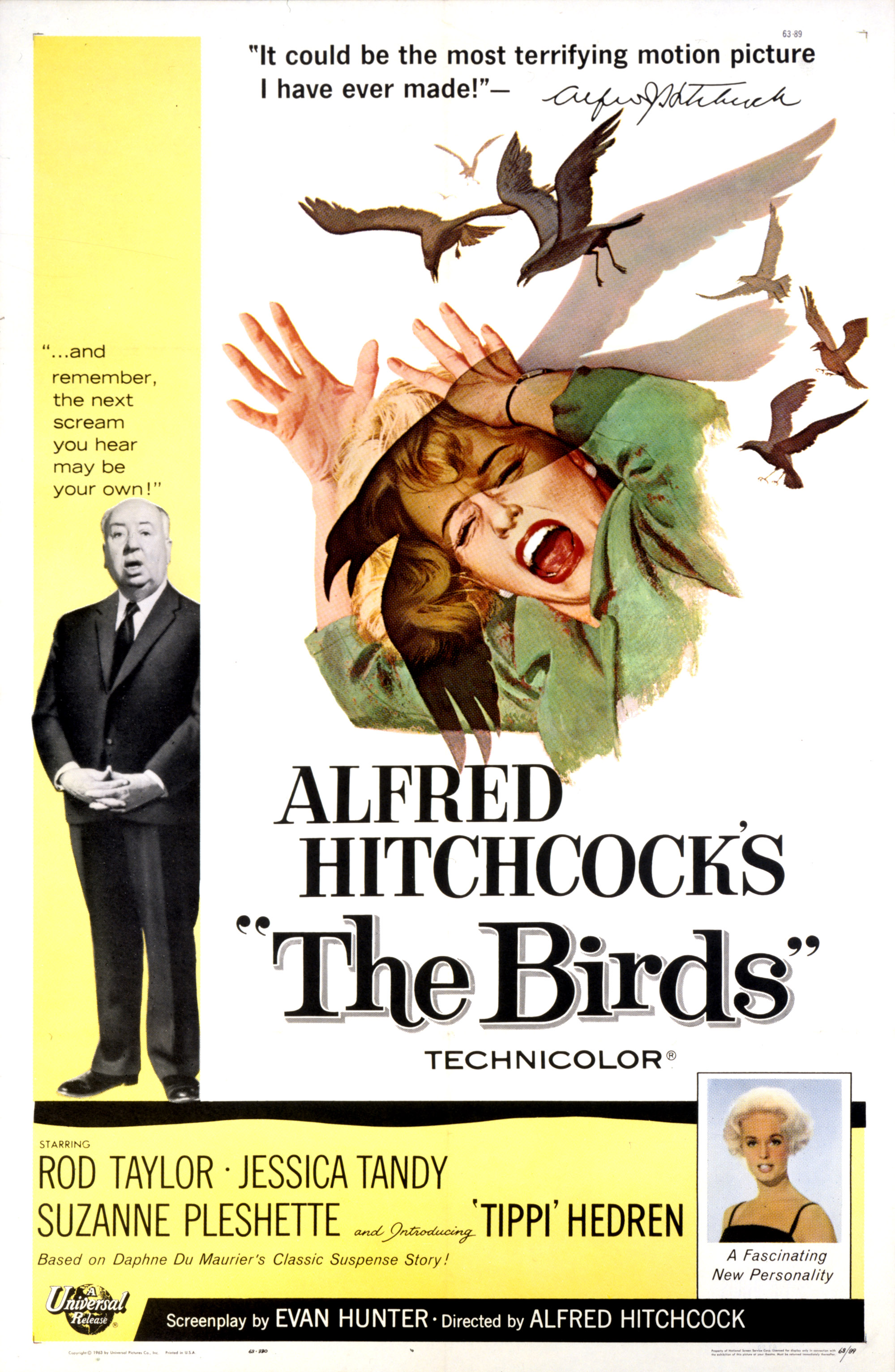
- Theatrical release poster
- Directed by: Alfred Hitchcock
- Screenplay by: Evan Hunter
- Based on: "The Birds" by Daphne du Maurier
- Produced by: Alfred Hitchcock
- Starring: Rod Taylor; Jessica Tandy; Suzanne Pleshette; Tippi Hedren
- Cinematography: Robert Burks
- Edited by: George Tomasini
- Production company: Alfred J. Hitchcock Productions
- Distributed by: Universal Pictures
- Release date: March 28, 1963
- Running time: 119 minutes
- Country: United States
- Language: English
- Budget: $3.3 million
- Box office: $11.4 million

The Birds is a 1963 American natural horror film produced and directed by Alfred Hitchcock, released by Universal Pictures and starring Rod Taylor, Jessica Tandy, Suzanne Pleshette, and introducing Tippi Hedren in her film debut. Loosely based on the 1952 short story by Daphne du Maurier, it focuses on a series of sudden and unexplained violent bird attacks on the people of Bodega Bay, California, over the course of a few days. The screenplay is by Evan Hunter, who was told by Hitchcock to develop new characters and a more elaborate plot while keeping du Maurier's title and concept of unexplained bird attacks.

While it initially received mixed reviews when originally released, its reputation improved over time and it has since been considered to be one of the greatest horror films of all time. At the 36th Academy Awards, Ub Iwerks was nominated for Best Special Effects for his work on the film. The award, however, went to the only other nominee, Emil Kosa Jr., for Cleopatra. Hedren won the Golden Globe Award for New Star of the Year – Actress for her role in the film. In 2016, it was deemed "culturally, historically, or aesthetically significant" by the United States Library of Congress, and selected for preservation in its National Film Registry.

== Plot ==
At a San Francisco pet store, socialite Melanie Daniels meets lawyer Mitch Brenner, who wants to buy lovebirds for his sister Cathy's 11th birthday. Mitch recognizes Melanie from her court appearance regarding a practical joke gone awry and pretends to mistake her for a shop employee. He tests Melanie's knowledge of birds, which she fails, then discloses his knowledge of her and leaves.

Intrigued, Melanie buys the lovebirds and drives to Bodega Bay after learning that Mitch has gone to his family's farm there. She learns Cathy's name from Annie Hayworth, a teacher at Bodega. Annie is Mitch's ex-lover, but their relationship ended due to his overbearing mother, Lydia, who feels insecure about any woman in Mitch's life.

Melanie rents a boat and crosses the bay to discreetly leave the lovebirds at the Brenner farm. Spotting her departing, Mitch drives to meet her at the dock. At the wharf, Melanie is attacked by a gull. Mitch tends to her wound and invites her to dinner.

At the farm, Lydia's hens are refusing to eat. Lydia dislikes Melanie due to her exaggerated reputation, as reported in gossip columns. The passing of Mitch's father four years ago is also brought up. Mitch invites Melanie, who is staying with Annie, to Cathy's birthday party being held the next day. Later, a dead gull is found at Annie's door.

During Cathy's party, Melanie tells Mitch about her troubled past and her mother running off with another man when she was Cathy's age. During a game, the children are attacked and wounded by gulls. Later that evening, as Melanie dines with the Brenners, sparrows swarm the house through the chimney. Mitch insists that she delay driving back to San Francisco and stay the night.

The next morning, Lydia visits her neighbor to discuss the problem with their chickens. She discovers broken windows in his bedroom and his eyeless corpse, pecked by birds, and flees in horror. While recovering at home, Lydia fears for Cathy's safety, and Melanie offers to pick her up at school. As Melanie waits outside the schoolhouse, a flock of crows engulf the jungle gym behind her. Anticipating an attack, she warns Annie. Rather than leaving the students in the building with its large windows, they evacuate them, and the crows attack later. Mitch finds Melanie at the diner. A heated debate ensues among those present whether the bird attacks are real, including an ornithologist who refuses to take these events seriously. When gulls attack a gas station attendant, Mitch and other men assist him outside. The spilled gasoline is ignited by an unaware bystander's match, causing an explosion. During the escalating fire, Melanie and others rush out, but more gulls attack. Melanie takes refuge in a telephone booth. Mitch saves her, and they return to the diner, where Melanie is blamed by a patron taking cover inside for the events unfolding in Bodega Bay.

Mitch and Melanie go to Annie's house to fetch Cathy and find Annie's body outside; she was killed by the crows while protecting Cathy. They take a traumatized Cathy home. That night, Melanie and the Brenners barricade themselves in the family home, which is attacked by birds. After discovering that the birds have pecked their way in through the roof, Melanie is trapped and severely wounded, but Mitch pulls her out. Mitch insists they all drive to San Francisco to take Melanie, now injured, traumatized and catatonic, to a hospital.

As Mitch readies Melanie's car for their escape, a sea of birds has gathered around the Brenner house. The car radio reports bird attacks on nearby communities and that the military may intervene. Cathy retrieves her lovebirds (the only birds who do not attack) from the house and joins Mitch and Lydia as they escort Melanie past a mass of birds and into the car. The car slowly drives away as the birds watch.

== Cast ==
Trailer for The Birds

- Rod Taylor as Mitch Brenner
- Jessica Tandy as Lydia Brenner
- Suzanne Pleshette as Annie Hayworth
- Tippi Hedren as Melanie Daniels
- Veronica Cartwright as Cathy Brenner
- Ethel Griffies as Mrs. Bundy, ornithologist
- Charles McGraw as Sebastian Sholes, fisherman
- Ruth McDevitt as Mrs. MacGruder, owner of the bird shop
- Lonny Chapman as Deke Carter, restaurateur
- Joe Mantell as cynical businessman
- Doodles Weaver as fisherman helping with rental boat
- Malcolm Atterbury as Deputy Al Malone
- John McGovern as postal clerk
- Karl Swenson as drunken doomsayer in diner
- Richard Deacon as Mitch's neighbor in San Francisco
- Elizabeth Wilson as Helen Carter, Deke's wife
- William Quinn as Sam
- Doreen Lang as hysterical mother in diner

Alfred Hitchcock makes his signature cameo as a man walking dogs out of the pet shop at the beginning of the film. They were two of his own Sealyham Terriers, named Geoffrey and Stanley.

== Production ==
=== Development ===
The screenplay for the film is based on Daphne du Maurier's novella "The Birds", which was first published in her 1952 short story collection The Apple Tree. The protagonist of the novella is a farm hand living in Cornwall, and the conclusion of the story is far more pessimistic than that of the film. It was adapted by Evan Hunter, who had written previously for Alfred Hitchcock's Mystery Magazine, and the television anthology series Alfred Hitchcock Presents. The relationship between Hunter and Hitchcock during the creation of The Birds was documented by the writer in his 1997 autobiography, Me and Hitch, which contains a variety of correspondence between the writer, director and Hitchcock's assistant, Peggy Robertson.

The Birds is also partly inspired by the true events of a mass bird attack on the seaside town of Capitola in California on August 18, 1961, when "Capitola residents awoke to a scene that seemed straight out of a horror movie. Hordes of seabirds were dive-bombing their homes, crashing into cars and spewing half-digested anchovies onto lawns". Alfred Hitchcock heard of this event and used it as research material for this film which was then in progress. The real cause of the birds' behavior was toxic algae, but that was not known back in the 1960s. In the film, the characters make reference to a similar bird attack "last year" in Santa Cruz, which is an implied reference to the Capitola attack.

=== Writing ===
Hunter began working on the screenplay in September 1961. He and Hitchcock developed the story, suggesting foundations such as the townspeople having a guilty secret to hide, and the birds an instrument of punishment. He suggested that the film begin using some elements borrowed from the screwball comedy genre, then have it evolve into "stark terror". This appealed to Hitchcock, according to the writer, because it conformed to his love of suspense: the title and the publicity would have already informed the audience that birds attack, but they do not know when. The initial humor followed by horror would turn the suspense into shock. At first, Hunter wanted the protagonist to be a school teacher, but this ended up being the basis for Annie Hayworth's character instead. Hunter organized his scripts by shots instead of scenes, although this did not affect the final film.

Hitchcock solicited comments from several people regarding the first draft of Hunter's screenplay. Consolidating their criticisms, Hitchcock wrote to Hunter, suggesting that the script (particularly the first part) was too long, contained insufficient characterization in the two leads, and that some scenes lacked drama and audience interest. Hitchcock, at later stages, consulted with his friends, Hume Cronyn (whose wife Jessica Tandy was playing Lydia), and V. S. Pritchett, who both offered lengthy reflections on the work. This is something that Hunter found difficult. Hitchcock cut the last 10 pages of the screenplay, although some sources say possibly more, in order to create a more ambiguous ending. Originally, he wanted the film to end without a "The End" card, but he was forced to include one before the film's full release.

=== Filming and special effects ===
Many exterior scenes were filmed on location at Bodega Bay and Bodega, California.

The majority of the birds seen in the film are real, although it is estimated that more than $200,000 was spent on the creation of mechanical birds for the film. Ray Berwick was in charge of the live birds used in the production, training and catching many of them himself. Some of the "crows" were actually ravens. The gulls were caught in the San Francisco garbage dump and the sparrows were caught by John "Bud" Cardos. However, the captured sparrows had to be used alongside birds from pet shops to achieve full effect in the scene where they invade the house.

Once the crow attack and attic scenes were assembled by the film's editor, George Tomasini, they were sent to the special effects department for enhancement. The film required myriad special effects and Hitchcock commissioned the help of various studios. The special effects shots of the attacking birds were completed at Walt Disney Studios by animator/technician Ub Iwerks, who used the sodium vapor process ("yellow screen"), which he had helped to develop. This results in very precise matte shots compared to blue screen special effects, necessary due to "fringing" of the image from the birds' rapid wing flapping. At Disney, Iwerks worked on the following scenes: the children's party, Melanie driving to Bodega Bay, and the first two cuts of the crow attack sequence. One of the biggest challenges facing Iwerks was the scene where a number of sparrows fly in through the chimney of the family home. Utilizing an optical printer, his superposition of a group of small birds flying inside an enclosed glass booth made it possible to multiply the birds in the living room. Most of the special effects work done at Disney was completed in the Process Lab on printer 10, which was made from Iwerks' own original design.

At Metro-Goldwyn-Mayer, Bob Hoag was put in charge of the optical effects for the sequence where Melanie hides inside a telephone booth as it is attacked by the birds. Hitchcock had requested that Hoag remove any shot where Melanie looked placid and urged that she be in constant movement instead. Hoag, along with a team of 30, worked together on the blue backing and sodium matte shots. Linwood Dunn, a founder of Film Effects of Hollywood, was commissioned to work on the attic scene. He was asked to produce a rough cut of the sequence before Hitchcock left for Berlin in December 1962. Bill Abbott, at Fox, was in charge of the optical effects for the crow attack sequence, which would take six weeks to finish. Abbott organised two teams—both working 11 hours a day—to work on the sequence simultaneously. Abbott's biggest challenge was size ratio, as he had to ensure that the birds looked like they were attacking the children. He achieved this by placing the birds within frame and zooming in on them to make them the correct size in proportion to the children. At Universal Pictures, associate editor Ross Hoffman and matte artist Albert Whitlock both worked on designing the town's backdrop, including the birds in the trees and the scenery for the river shots of Melanie's car arriving in Bodega Bay. The Birds featured 370 effects shots, the final shot being a composite of 32 separate elements.

== Soundtrack ==
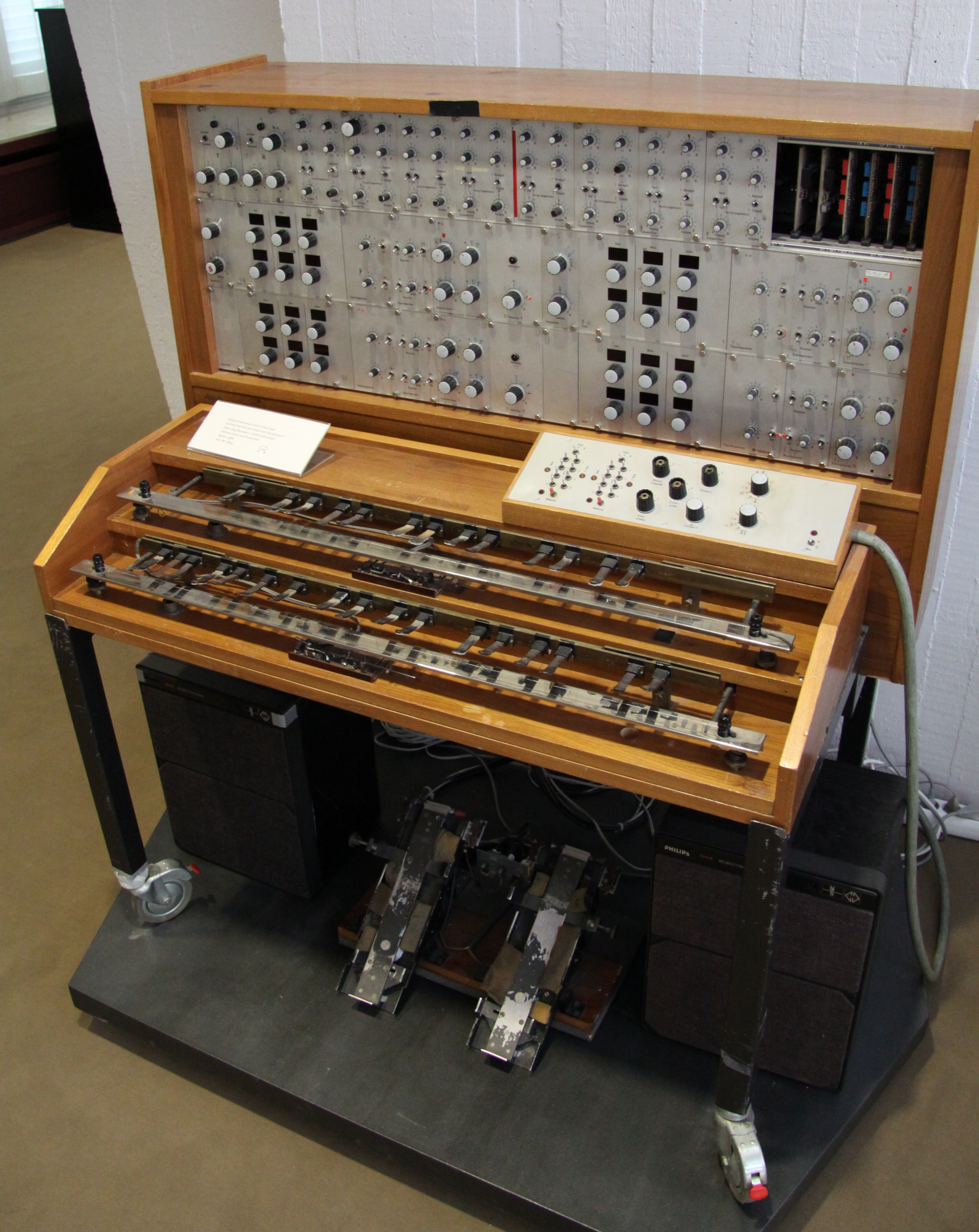
Many of the sound effects were created on the Mixtur-Trautonium, an electronic musical instrument developed by Oskar Sala.

Hitchcock decided to do without any conventional incidental score. Instead, he made use of sound effects and sparse source music in counterpoint to calculated silences. He wanted to use the electroacoustic Mixtur-Trautonium to create the bird calls and noises. He had first encountered this predecessor to the synthesizer on Berlin radio in the late 1920s. It was invented by Friedrich Trautwein, and further developed by Oskar Sala into the Trautonium, which would create some of the bird sounds for this film.

The director commissioned Sala and Remi Gassmann to design an electronic soundtrack. They are credited with "electronic sound production and composition", and Hitchcock's previous musical collaborator, Bernard Herrmann, is credited as "sound consultant".

Source music includes the first of Claude Debussy's Deux arabesques, which Tippi Hedren's character plays on piano (dubbed by John Williams), and "Nickety Nackety Now Now Now" by folk musician Chubby Parker, which is sung by the schoolchildren.

== Analysis ==
=== Themes ===
Among the central themes explored in The Birds are those of love and violence. The representation of the birds in the film constantly changes to reflect the development of these themes, and the story itself. At first, the lovebirds in the pet store signify the blossoming love between Melanie and Mitch, and the sexual tension between the two. However, the birds' symbolism changes once they begin to attack Bodega Bay. Hitchcock stated in an interview that the birds in the film rise up against the humans to punish them for taking nature for granted.

Humanities scholar Camille Paglia wrote a monograph about the film for the BFI Film Classics series. She interprets it as an ode to the many facets of female sexuality and, by extension, nature itself. She notes that women play pivotal roles in it. Mitch is defined by his relationships with his mother, sister, and ex-lover—a careful balance that is disrupted by his attraction to the beautiful Melanie.

The theme [of the film], after all, is complacency, as the director has stated on innumerable occasions. When we first meet each of the major characters, their infinite capacity of self-absorption is emphasized. Tippi Hedren's bored socialite is addicted to elaborately time-consuming practical jokes. Rod Taylor's self-righteous lawyer flaunts his arrogant sensuality, Suzanne Pleshette, his ex-fiancée, wallows in self-pity, and Jessica Tandy, his possessive mother, cringes from her fear of loneliness. With such complex, unsympathetic characters to contend with, the audience begins to identify with the point of view of the birds, actually the inhuman point of view.

— Andrew Sarris, review in The Village Voice (April 4, 1963)

=== Style ===
Montage editing and slow pacing are used within the film to build suspense and elicit a greater emotional response from the audience during the attack scenes: "The pattern of The Birds was deliberately to go slow". This is exemplified in the scene where the birds gradually gather outside of the school, while an unobservant Melanie sits and waits on the bench. The camera then cuts between her and the increasing number of birds that swoop down onto the jungle gym behind her until they finally attack.

Eyeline matches and point-of-view (POV) shots within the film encourage audience identification with particular characters and their subjective experiences. This is achieved by cutting between the character and the object of their gaze. For example, when Melanie crosses the bay near the beginning of the film, the camera cuts between close-ups of her face and shots of the Brenner house from her perspective, as she watches Mitch fall for her prank.

The focus on editing and visuals rather than dialogue is also an element of pure cinema that Hitchcock largely uses throughout his work.

== Hitchcock's behavior towards Hedren ==
More than fifty years after the film was released, it emerged in a series of interviews that Alfred Hitchcock may have behaved inappropriately towards Tippi Hedren during the filming of The Birds. Hedren said there were several incidents where she was subjected to sexual harassment from the famed director. Cast and crew described his behaviour on occasion as "obsessive" and Hedren stated that "he suddenly grabbed me and put his hands on me. It was sexual". She stated that she rejected Hitchcock's advances on numerous occasions. Following the rejection, Hedren was injured during the filming of the phone booth attack scene, consequently suffering cuts to her face from a pane of glass shattering on her. She said she was misled about the logistics of the final attack sequence because mechanical birds were replaced with real ones at the last minute.

There has been speculation that "Hitchcock's deliberate inflicting of injury was revenge for Hedren's spurning of his advances". Hitchcock also signed Hedren to a seven-year contract, which she stated restricted her ability to work. These allegations were not brought to light until after Hitchcock's death. Although they have never been confirmed, they have widely been reported, including by Hedren's co-star, Rod Taylor.

Hedren would later say during a 2016 interview with Larry King that the sexual advances "didn't happen until we were almost finished with Marnie", that they had not started during The Birds, and that up until the end of Marnie Hitchcock had been "easy to work with", but in her memoir released around the same time, she repeated the earlier allegations, though clarified that the sexual assaults did not begin until Marnie.

The controversy of this relationship is explored in the 2012 HBO/BBC film The Girl. Hedren's daughter Melanie Griffith claims that Hitchcock's abuse extended to her when he played a "prank" by gifting six-year-old Melanie with a miniature wax figure of her mother in a coffin.

== Release ==
The film premiered March 28, 1963, in New York City. The Museum of Modern Art hosted an invitation-only screening as part of a 50-film retrospective of Hitchcock's film work. The MoMA series had a booklet with a monograph on the director written by Peter Bogdanovich. The film was screened out of competition in May at a prestigious invitational showing at the 1963 Cannes Film Festival with Hitchcock and Hedren in attendance.

As a special favor to Hedren, Hitchcock allowed her to take a copy of the film with her when she visited her hometown of Minneapolis after the film premiered in New York City. On April 1, Hedren hosted her parents and about 130 residents of Lafayette, Minnesota, where her parents lived when she was born, to an exclusive screening of the film at the local neighborhood theater Hedren frequented in her youth, The Westgate, in Morningside, Minnesota, a suburb of Minneapolis, where Hedren grew up. The theater was demolished in 2019.

== Reception ==
The Birds received mixed reviews upon its initial release. Bosley Crowther of The New York Times was positive, calling it "a horror film that should raise the hackles on the most courageous and put goose-pimples on the toughest hide". Crowther was unsure whether the birds were meant to be an allegory because "it isn't in Mr. Hitchcock's style to inject allegorical meanings or social significance in his films", but he suggested that they could represent the Furies of Greek mythology who pursued the wicked upon the earth.

The original story's author Daphne du Maurier disliked the film because Hitchcock changed the location from a farm in England to a sleepy beach community in Northern California.

Andrei Tarkovsky considered it a masterpiece and named it one of the 77 essential works of cinema.

Stanley Kauffmann of The New Republic called The Birds "the worst thriller of his [Hitchcock's] that I can remember".

Richard L. Coe of The Washington Post called it "gorgeous good fun" in the vein of Hitchcock's earlier black comedy The Trouble with Harry, adding: "I haven't had this kind of merriment since King Kong toppled from the Empire State Building". The Monthly Film Bulletin wrote: "For all the brilliance of scenes like the attack down the chimney, one rarely has a chance to suspend disbelief", but the review still thought that "there is still a great deal more to enjoy than carp at". The film ranked second on Cahiers du Cinéma's Top 10 Films of the Year List in 1963. Andrew Sarris of The Village Voice praised the film, writing: "Drawing from the relatively invisible literary talents of Daphne du Maurier and Evan Hunter, Alfred Hitchcock has fashioned a major work of cinematic art".

Philip K. Scheuer of the Los Angeles Times was among the critics who panned the film, writing that Hitchcock "was once widely quoted as saying he hated actors. After his 1960 Psycho and now The Birds, it must be fairly obvious that he has extended his abhorrence to the whole human race. For reasons hardly justified either dramatically or aesthetically, the old master has become a master of the perverse. He has gone all out for shock for shock's sake, and it is too bad". Variety published a mixed assessment, writing that while the film was "slickly executed and fortified with his characteristic tongue-in-cheek touches", Hitchcock "deals more provocatively and effectively in human menace. A fantasy framework dilutes the toxic content of his patented terror-tension formula, and gives the picture a kind of sci-fi exploitation feel, albeit with a touch of production gloss". Brendan Gill of The New Yorker called the film "a sorry failure. Hard as it may be to believe of a Hitchcock, it doesn't arouse suspense, which is, of course, what justifies and transforms the sadism that lies at the heart of every thriller. Here the sadism is all too nakedly, repellently present".

It is the only Hitchcock movie to have been featured in Mad (as "For the Birds", issue 82, October 1963, by Mort Drucker, Arnie Kogen, and Lou Silverstone). In the Mad spoof, it is "revealed" that the birds are controlled by Burt Lancaster as revenge for his not having won an Academy Award that year for his starring role in Birdman of Alcatraz.

The film's first television broadcast was in Canada on CTV television on December 30, 1967. Its subsequent U.S. appearance was on NBC television on January 6, 1968, and became the most-watched film on television to that time, surpassing The Bridge on the River Kwai with a Nielsen rating of 38.9 and an audience share of 59%. The record was beaten in 1972 by Love Story.

With the passage of time, much like many other of Hitchcock's works, the film's standing among critics has much improved. On Rotten Tomatoes it has a 95% rating based on reviews from 73 critics, with an average rating of 8.60/10, and the website's consensus states: "Proving once again that build-up is the key to suspense, Hitchcock successfully turned birds into some of the most terrifying villains in horror history". On Metacritic, it has a score of 90 out of 100, based on reviews from 15 critics. Film critic David Thomson refers to it as Hitchcock's "last unflawed film". Italian film maker Federico Fellini ranked the film among his top ten favourite films of all-time list. Akira Kurosawa included the film in his Top 100 Favourite Films of All Time list. In 2000, The Guardian ranked the scene where the crows gather on the climbing frame at No. 16 on their list of "The top 100 film moments". The scenes where birds are attacking humans viciously were collectively ranked at No. 96 on Bravo's The 100 Scariest Movie Moments. In 2021, the film was ranked at No. 29 by Time Out on their list of "The 100 best horror movies".

The film was honored by the American Film Institute as the seventh greatest thriller in American cinema.

=== Accolades ===
At the 36th Academy Awards, the film's special effects supervisor, Ub Iwerks was nominated for an Academy Award for Best Special Effects but lost to Cleopatra. Hedren received the Golden Globe Award for New Star of the Year – Actress in 1964, tying with Ursula Andress and Elke Sommer. She also received the Photoplay Award as Most Promising Newcomer. The film ranked No. 1 of the top 10 foreign films selected by the Bengal Film Journalists' Association Awards. Hitchcock also received the Association's Director Award for the film.

It also won the Horror Hall of Fame Award in 1991.

In 2016, The Birds was deemed "culturally, historically, or aesthetically significant" by the United States Library of Congress, and selected for preservation in its National Film Registry.

== Legacy ==
The Birds has been very influential on the horror genre inspiring filmmakers like Guillermo del Toro, John Carpenter, Xan Cassavetes, Joe Dante, and Roger Corman.

Lucile Hadžihalilović said that she has always been drawn to Hitchcock's women, and Melanie in The Birds feels like a distant cousin to Marion Cotillard's character in her 2025 fantasy drama film The Ice Tower, as she is "beautiful, cold and distant, but with deep inner turmoil. And then, of course, there are the birds. Always threatening."

== Remake ==
A planned remake was announced in 2007, starring Naomi Watts and directed by Martin Campbell with a script by Stiles White and Juliet Snowden.

In August 2017, the BBC announced that Heyday Television would produce a television miniseries that followed du Maurier's original story, with Conor McPherson serving as writer, but the project did not move forward. In May 2026, it was announced that the miniseries would be written by Tom Spezialy, with Sarah Snook starring as Myra Massey, a new female protagonist. In October, it was reported that HBO had picked up the project for development.

== Sequel ==
An unconnected television sequel, The Birds II: Land's End, was released in 1994. Director Rick Rosenthal removed his name from credit and used the Hollywood pseudonym Alan Smithee. The sequel featured entirely new characters and a different setting, with Bodega Bay only mentioned once. Tippi Hedren returned in a supporting role, but not as her original character. The sequel was panned by critics and audiences.

== See also ==
- Bodega Bay Nuclear Power Plant – Proposed Northern California nuclear power facility
- List of American films of 1963
- Nezura – An unfinished Japanese monster film and a precursor of Gamera to be inspired by The Birds
