= 87th Precinct =

Police procedural novels and stories by Ed McBain

87th Precinct series
- Author: Evan Hunter (as Ed McBain)
- Country: United States
- Language: English
- Genre: police procedural
- Publisher: Original US editions: Permabooks; Dell Publishing; Doubleday (publisher); Random House; Viking Press; Arbor House; William Morrow and Company; Warner Books; Simon and Schuster; Harcourt Books
- Published: 1956–2005
- Media type: Print (Hardcover)
- No. of books: 55

The 87th Precinct is a series of police procedural novels and stories by the American author Evan Hunter under the pseudonym Ed McBain. Hunter's 87th Precinct works have been adapted, sometimes loosely, into movies and television on several occasions.

== Setting ==
The series is based on the work of the police detective squad of the 87th Precinct in the central district of Isola, a large fictional city obviously based on New York City. Isola is the name of the central district of the city (it fulfills the role of the borough of Manhattan within New York City). Other districts in McBain's fictionalized version of New York broadly correspond to NYC's other four boroughs, Calm's Point standing in for Brooklyn, Majesta representing Queens, Riverhead substituting for the Bronx, and Bethtown for Staten Island.

Other recognizable locations that correspond to New York City landmarks are Grover Park (Central Park), Sand's Spit (Long Island), the rivers Harb (Hudson) and Dix (East River), neighborhoods such as The Quarter (The Village), Devil's Break (Spuyten Duyvil), Stewart City (Tudor City), and Diamondback (Harlem), and specific places such as Buena Vista Hospital (Bellevue), Ramsey University (New York University), Hall Avenue (Fifth Avenue), Jefferson Avenue (Madison Avenue), and the Stem or Stemmler Avenue (Broadway).

The 87th Precinct has sixteen detectives on its regular roster and is said to have the highest crime rate in the city and the busiest Fire Department in the world. Every 87th Precinct novel begins with a disclaimer:

The city in these pages is imaginary.

The people, the places are all fictitious.

Only the police routine is based on established investigatory technique.

== Characters ==
The books feature a large ensemble cast, often but not always centered on about half a dozen police detectives and other supporting characters. Detective Steve Carella, a dedicated, honest police officer, is a major character in the series, usually (although not always) at the center of the main investigative plot of any given book. We also see Carella's family life, initially as a newlywed with his deaf-mute wife Teddy, and eventually encompassing the births and growing pains of their three children.

Carella most frequently works alongside detectives Cotton Hawes (initially a resented newcomer), Hal Willis (short, and very aware of it), Bert Kling (an ambitious youngster), Roger Havilland (hot-tempered and quite possibly corrupt), and the wryly cynical but ultra-patient and unfortunately named Meyer Meyer. A mysterious antagonist known as The Deaf Man also appears occasionally over the years. The Deaf Man is a master criminal, who is "a little hard of hearing" (although this may be an affectation) and whose true identity is never revealed. He is the precinct's, and, specifically, Carella's nemesis, and appears in the novels The Heckler, Fuzz, Let's Hear it for the Deaf Man, Eight Black Horses, Mischief, and Hark! Also prominent in several later books is Detective Ollie Weeks, a fat, bigoted, uncouth slob with almost no social graces who is not a member of the 87th, but who is often assigned to work with members of the 87th on cross-jurisdictional cases.

Main characters

- Detective Stephen Louis "Steve" Carella
- Detective Meyer Meyer
- Detective Cotton Hawes
- Detective Bert Kling
- Detective Hal Willis
- Detective Arthur Brown
- Detective Lieutenant Peter Byrnes, squad commander

Recurring characters

- Detective Eileen Burke
- Detective Andy Parker
- Detective Dick Genero
- Detective Bob O'Brien
- Detective Tack Fujiwara
- Sergeant Dave Murchison, Desk Sergeant
- Sergeant Alf Miscolo, Clerical Office
- Detective Monoghan and Detective Monroe, Homicide Detectives
- Detective Oliver Wendell "Fat Ollie" Weeks (Detective from the 88th Precinct)
- William "Fats" Donner and Daniel "Danny Gimp" Nelson, informants
- Sam Grossman, Head of the Police Lab
- Paul Blaney, Chief Medical Examiner, and his twin brother, Carl, also a M.E.
- Cliff Savage, newspaper reporter
- Theodora "Teddy" Carella (née Franklin), Steve Carella's wife
- The Deaf Man

== The 87th Precinct series ==
1. Cop Hater (1956)
2. The Mugger (1956)
3. The Pusher (1956)
4. The Con Man (1957)
5. Killer's Choice (1957)
6. Killer's Payoff (1958)
7. Lady Killer (1958)
8. Killer's Wedge (1959)
9. 'Til Death (1959)
10. King's Ransom (1959)
11. Give the Boys a Great Big Hand (1960)
12. The Heckler (1960)
13. See Them Die (1960)
14. Lady, Lady I Did It (1961)
15. The Empty Hours (1962) — three novellas
16. Like Love (1962)
17. Ten Plus One (1963)
18. Ax (1964)
19. He Who Hesitates (1964)
20. Doll (1965)
21. Eighty Million Eyes (1966)
22. Fuzz (1968)
23. Shotgun (1969)
24. Jigsaw (1970)
25. Hail, Hail, the Gang's All Here (1971)
26. Sadie When She Died (1972)
27. Let's Hear It for the Deaf Man (1973)
28. Hail to the Chief (1973)
29. Bread (1974)
30. Blood Relatives (1975)
31. So Long as You Both Shall Live (1976)
32. Long Time No See (1977)
33. Calypso (1979)
34. Ghosts (1980)
35. Heat (1981)
36. Ice (1983)
37. Lightning (1984)
38. And All Through the House (1984) — short novella, reissued with illustrations in 1994
39. Eight Black Horses (1985)
40. Poison (1987)
41. Tricks (1987)
42. Lullaby (1989)
43. Vespers (1990)
44. Widows (1991)
45. Kiss (1992)
46. Mischief (1993)
47. Romance (1995)
48. Nocturne (1997)
49. The Big Bad City (1999)
50. The Last Dance (2000)
51. Money, Money, Money (2001)
52. Fat Ollie's Book (2002)
53. The Frumious Bandersnatch (2003)
54. Hark! (2004)
55. Fiddlers (2005)

== Other writings set in the 87th Precinct ==
- Reruns (1997) — short story published in the TV Guide
- Love or Money (2003) — fragment published on the BBC website
- Merely Hate (2005) — novella published in the anthology Transgressions, edited by Ed McBain

== Extracts ==
- McBain's Ladies (1988) — passages from various novels
- McBain's Ladies, Too (1989) — passages from various novels

Hunter also routinely published promotional extracts from the 87th Precinct novels in magazines around the time of book publication.

== Other media ==
Theatrical films

- Cop Hater (1958) starring Robert Loggia and Gerald O'Loughlin
- The Mugger (1958) starring Kent Smith, Nan Martin and James Franciscus
- The Pusher (1960) starring Robert Lansing
- Tengoku to Jigoku (High and Low) (1963) Japanese film directed by Akira Kurosawa starring Toshiro Mifune, Tatsuya Nakadai and Kyōko Kagawa (based on King's Ransom)
- Sans Mobile Apparent (Without Apparent Motive) (1971) French/Italian film starring Jean-Louis Trintignant, Carla Gravina, Jean-Pierre Marielle and Dominique Sanda (Based on Ten Plus One)
- Fuzz (1972) starring Burt Reynolds, Raquel Welch, Yul Brynner, Tom Skerritt and Jack Weston
- Les Liens du Sang (Blood Relatives) (1978) French/Canadian film starring Donald Sutherland, Donald Pleasence and David Hemmings
- Kofuku (aka Lonely Heart) (1981) (based on Lady, Lady I Did It) Japanese film starring Yutaka Mizutani, Toshiyuki Nagashima and Rie Nakahara
- "Способ убийства" ("Killer's Wedge") (1993) Ukraine/Russia film

TV series and TV films

- 87th Precinct (1961–62 NBC) television series co-starring Robert Lansing, Gena Rowlands, Ron Harper, Gregory Walcott, and Norman Fell
- Bob Hope Presents The Chrysler Theatre ("Deadlock", the final 1967 episode of this anthology show, is an adaptation of Killer's Wedge)
- Columbo: No Time to Die (based on So Long as You Both Shall Live) (1992) (TV film)
- Columbo: Undercover (based on Jigsaw) (1994) (TV film) starring Harrison Page as Detective Sgt. Arthur Brown.
- Ed McBain's 87th Precinct: Lightning (1995) (TV film) Aired on NBC starring Randy Quaid and Ving Rhames
- Ed McBain's 87th Precinct: Ice (1996) (TV film) Aired on NBC starring Dale Midkiff and Joe Pantoliano
- Ed McBain's 87th Precinct: Heatwave (1997) (TV film) Aired on NBC starring Dale Midkiff and Erika Eleniak

Literature

- 87th Precinct (1962) (Comic Book series)
- Polishataren (Cop Hater) (1990), a Swedish graphic novel written by Claes Reimerthi and drawn by Martin Sauri
- The Stand: the Complete & Uncut Edition (1990) by Stephen King has a minor character, "Edward M. Norris, lieutenant of police, detective squad, in the Big Apple's 87th Precinct" (pg 71). Steve Carella is briefly mentioned.
- The Last Best Hope (1998), a novel in McBain's Matthew Hope series, features Steve Carella as a supporting character.
- Stephen King novella, "The Mist", one of the major characters is named Ollie Weeks, a detective from the neighboring 83rd Precinct.

=== Podcasts ===
- Hark! The 87th Precinct Podcast(2016 - ongoing) [Audio Podcast] A podcast dedicated to a book-by-book exploration of the 87th Precinct series, its adaptations and spin-offs. The podcast also explores some other works by Evan Hunter and has featured interviews with Otto Penzler (writer and proprietor of The Mysterious Bookshop in New York) and James Naughtie (British radio presenter and writer).
- Paperback Warrior (2019) [Audio Podcast] features a segment on Ed McBain's 87th Precinct. The episode delves into the author's bibliography and explores his police procedural series as well as the debut novel Cop Hater. Co-Hosts Tom Simon and Eric Compton both suggest that the 87th Precinct was influenced by the television show Dragnet.
