= Eileen Letchworth =

American actress

- Born: July 19, 1922; Charleroi, Pennsylvania, U.S.
- Died: February 16, 2003 (aged 80); New York City, U.S.
- Education: Carnegie Tech
- Occupation: Actress
- Spouses: William C. Larson (m. 1945, divorced) Paul Larson (m. 1966)
- Children: 1

Eileen Letchworth (July 19, 1922 – February 15, 2003) was an American actress.

== Early years ==
Born in Charleroi, Pennsylvania, Letchworth was the daughter of Mr. and Mrs. Alvin Letchworth. Her father was president of the Bethel Township School Board for 16 years, and her grandfather, G. E. Letchworth, was a Methodist minister. She had a sister, Doris.

After attending Bethel High School, Letchworth became a drama student at Carnegie Tech. She went on to act at the Pittsburgh Playhouse. In 1953, Letchworth was one of three recipients of the first Faculty Fund scholarships to attend the American Theatre Wing Professional Training Program. Selected from more than 100 applicants, the three each received one year's training in the program.

== Career ==
=== Stage ===
Letchworth's debut on Broadway came when she portrayed Frances in I Gotta Get Out (1947). The play was not successful, and she returned to Pittsburgh to work as a model. In August 1960, she had the leading female role in The Dark at the Top of the Stairs at the Hyde Park Playhouse. She also acted in The Matchmaker at the Playhouse that summer.

Letchworth returned to Broadway to portray June in Say, Darling (1958) and Mrs. Durant in Cactus Flower (1965). She was also an understudy for A Desert Incident (1959), The Warm Peninsula (1959), Absence of a Cello (1964), and A Very Rich Woman (1965). Her other roles on stage included "a slickly sophisticted suburbanite" in Spofford at the Parker Playhouse in Fort Lauderdale, Florida, in 1969. She played Amanda in The Glass Menagerie at the Rodale Theater in Allentown, Pennsylvania, in 1980, and she portrayed Flora Van Huysen in an off-Broadway production of The Matchmaker (1991).

=== TV and film ===
In 1974, Letchworth received attention for having the results of her own facelift shown on network television as part of the ABC soap opera All My Children. After learning of Letchworth's desire for time off to have the cosmetic surgery, the show's creator, Agnes Nixon, suggested writing a facelift for Letchworth's character into the script. The actress agreed. In August 1974, she had the surgery; on August 12, her doctor removed her bandages, and on August 13, her character, Margo Flax, had her bandages removed on the program. Letchworth used no makeup on the program for about a month, allowing the cameras to show the healing of her face from its post-surgery puffiness and black eyes.

In addition to All My Children, Letchworth was on several other daytime soap operas, including the role of Anne Mason on Another World, Sharon Feress on Love of Life and appearances on One Life to Live. She was also featured on other TV programs, including The Phil Silvers Show and talk shows hosted by Phil Donahue and Polly Bergen. She also appeared in several TV commercials.

Letchworth appeared in the films Last Summer (1969) and Gypsy 83 (2001).

== Personal life and death ==
On February 28, 1945, Letchworth married William C. Larson. After they divorced, she married actor Paul Larson on August 14, 1966, in New York. She had a son, Eric, from her first marriage and a stepson, also named Eric, from her second marriage. She died on February 15, 2003, in New York City, aged 80.
