= The Mugger (film) =

1958 film by William A. Berke

- Directed by: William Berke
- Screenplay by: Henry Kane
- Based on: The Mugger (novel) by Ed McBain
- Produced by: William Berke
- Starring: Kent Smith; Nan Martin; James Franciscus
- Cinematography: J. Burgi Contner
- Edited by: Everett Sutherland
- Music by: Albert Glasser
- Production company: Barbizon Productions
- Distributed by: United Artists
- Release date: November 1958
- Running time: 74 minutes
- Country: United States
- Language: English

The Mugger is a 1958 American film noir-crime film about a police psychiatrist who is attempting to catch a mysterious mugger that has been attacking women in his city, stealing their purses and slashing their left cheek. The film is a police procedural in structure, focusing on psychiatrist Dr. Pete Graham's investigation into the title character's identity.

The film's screenplay, written by Henry Kane, is based on the novel of the same name by Evan Hunter (writing under the pen name Ed McBain). William Berke directed the film, the second of two adaptions of Hunter's 87th Precinct novels he released in 1958 (following Cop Hater). It was Berke's final completed film as a director; he died the same year.

It was filmed in Bay Ridge, Brooklyn, New York. Several of the car scenes were filmed on the Belt Parkway. The Veterans Hospital located on the Fort Hamilton Army Base with no Verazzano Bridge can be seen during the first car scene. The restaurant scene was filmed on 67th Street and 4th Avenue right next to the subway exit. Other Bay Ridge locations can be seen throughout the film as well.

== Cast ==
- Kent Smith as Dr. Pete Graham
- Nan Martin as Claire Townsend
- James Franciscus as Eddie Baxter
- Stefan Schnabel as "Fats" Donner
- Dick O'Neill as Cassidy
- Leonard Stone as Jim Kelly
- Sandra Church as Jeannie Page
- John Alexander as Chief of Police
- Arthur Storch as Jack "Skippy" Randolph
