= Shotgun (novel) =

1969 novel by Evan Hunter

- First edition
- Author: Evan Hunter (as Ed McBain)
- Language: English
- Series: 87th Precinct
- Genre: Crime fiction
- Publisher: Doubleday
- Publication date: 1969
- Publication place: United States
- Media type: Print (Paperback)
- Pages: 173
- Preceded by: Fuzz
- Followed by: Jigsaw

Shotgun is a crime novel by American writer Ed McBain. It is the 23rd book in his 87th Precinct series.

== Reception ==
The New York Times Book Review wrote that Shotgun was similar to McBain's previous book, Fuzz, in its more lighthearted approach to the police procedural. However, the reviewer, Allen Hubin, found the work inferior, with a fragmented plot and the humor not as funny. Nevertheless, Hubin said it compared favorable with other recent "fun novels".
