= Felice Orlandi =

American actor (1925–2003)

- Orlandi in 1968
- Born: 18 September 1925; Avezzano, Italy
- Died: 21 May 2003 (aged 77); Burbank, California, U.S.
- Occupation: Actor
- Spouse: Alice Ghostley (m. 1953)

Felice Orlandi (18 September 1925 – 21 May 2003) was an Italian-born American actor, known for roles in films such as The Pusher (1960), Bullitt (1968), Catch-22 (1970) and The Driver (1978). He also appeared in numerous TV series during the 1960s-1980s, including Gunsmoke, Mannix, Hogan's Heroes, Hawaii Five-O and Hill Street Blues.

A native of Avezzano in Italy, he was raised in Cleveland, and earned a theater arts degree at Carnegie Tech (now Carnegie Mellon University). He made his Broadway debut in 1954 in The Girl on the Via Flaminia. He was married to actress Alice Ghostley for 50 years.

== Death ==
Orlandi died of lung cancer in Burbank, California, at age 77.

== Filmography ==
Year	Title	Role	Notes
1955	Killer's Kiss	Gangster	
1956	The Harder They Fall	Vince Fawcett	
1958	Never Love a Stranger	Bert	
1960	The Pusher	The Pusher	
1968	Bullitt	Albert Renick	
1969	They Shoot Horses, Don't They?	Mario	
1970	Catch-22	Man in Black	
1972	The Outside Man	Anderson	
1973	The Outfit	Frank Orlandi	
1975	Hard Times	Le Beau	
1978	The Driver	Gold Plainclothesman	
1980	The Long Riders	Mr. Reddick	
1989	Hit List	Joey DeSalvo	
1990	Another 48 Hrs.	Warden	(final film role)
