= The Birds (story) =

1952 short story by Daphne du Maurier

- Short story by Daphne du Maurier
- Country: United Kingdom
- Genres: Horror, thriller, novelette

Publication
- Published in: The Apple Tree
- Publisher: Penguin Books
- Media type: Print
- Publication date: 1952

"The Birds" is a horror story by the British writer Daphne du Maurier, first published in her 1952 collection The Apple Tree. The story is set in du Maurier's home county of Cornwall shortly after the end of the Second World War. A farmhand, his family and community come under lethal attack from flocks of birds.

The story was the inspiration for Alfred Hitchcock's film of the same name, released in 1963, the same year that The Apple Tree was reprinted as The Birds and Other Stories. In 2009, the Irish playwright Conor McPherson adapted the story for the stage at Dublin's Gate Theatre.

== Plot ==
Nat Hocken, a disabled war veteran, works part time for Mr Trigg at his farm on the Cornish coast. One day in early December, he notices unusually large flocks of birds behaving restlessly, and he muses that they have received a message that winter is coming.

That night the weather turns bitterly cold. Nat hears a bird insistently tapping on his bedroom window, and when he opens it half a dozen birds fly at his face and try to peck his eyes. Hearing his children screaming, he rushes into their room to find that they are being set upon by many more. Using a blanket as a weapon, he kills as many birds as he can. In the morning he clears up fifty dead robins, finches and other small birds. The others have left.

Nat tells his neighbours about the night's events but is not believed. As he walks to the beach to dispose of the dead birds, he realises that what appear to be whitecaps on the sea are actually tens of thousands of gulls riding the waves, apparently waiting. On the wireless, the BBC reports that birds have been massing all over Britain and that people are being attacked. Anticipating another assault, this time from the gulls, Nat boards up his cottage windows. The BBC announcer appears not to understand the severity of what is to come. By 3 o'clock the gulls have taken flight in vast numbers, darkening the sky.

Picking up his daughter from the school bus stop, Nat spots Mr Trigg who agrees to take her home in his car. Mr Trigg is unfazed by the official announcements and plans to shoot the birds for sport. Nat hurries home on foot. Just as he reaches the final field, the gulls descend and attack, tearing at his hands, wrists and neck. Bleeding, he manages to stumble in through his door as a gannet high above him folds its wings and drops like a stone.

Across the country massive flocks of birds gather, acting purposefully to force entry into buildings. A national emergency is declared, and people are told not to leave their homes. The news announcer states that the BBC will be going silent for the night and will resume broadcasting the next morning.

Nat brings the family into the kitchen for safety, from where they can hear the muffled sounds of birds pressed together on the window sills, trying to force an entry. During dinner, they hear the sound of naval guns, and of aeroplanes overhead, followed by the sound of planes crashing as birds fling themselves against the propellers. Eventually the assault dies down. Nat deduces that the birds attack only when the tide is coming in.

The next day, wireless broadcasts do not resume. The birds once again set upon the cottage, even forcing their way down the chimney. During a lull as the tide recedes, Nat and his family walk to Mr Trigg's farm to seek supplies. They pass piles of dead birds, with those still living peering at them from afar. Finding the deceased and mutilated remains of Mr Trigg and his wife in the house and their farm hand Jim in the field, they gather supplies and return home, passing the dead postman and seeing no signs of life from the council houses in the village. As the tide turns, the birds resume their assault. Nat listens to the sound of splintering wood as hawks concentrate their attack on the doors. He smokes his last cigarette, then throws the empty pack into the fire and watches it burn.

== Interpretation ==
One interpretation of the story suggests that it reflects the British experience during the Second World War, evoking anxieties about the government's failure to protect their citizens and intrusions into domestic spaces by aggressive interlopers.

== Background ==
Du Maurier's inspiration for the story was the sight of a farmer being attacked by a flock of gulls as he ploughed a field.

== Radio and television dramatisations ==
The story has been dramatised for radio and TV on several occasions, including:

- Episode 838 of Lux Radio Theatre (airing as an episode of the summer series Lux Summer Theatre) on 20 July 1953 with Herbert Marshall.
- Episode 217 of radio's Escape on 10 July 1954 with Ben Wright and Virginia Gregg.
- Episode 240 (final show in the series) of CBS-TV series Danger on 31 May 1955 with Michael Strong and Betty Lou Holland.
- BBC Afternoon Theatre on 20 November 1974 with Howard Goorney, Chris Harris, and Elizabeth Boxer.
- An adaptation by Melissa Murray, for BBC Radio 4's The Friday Play, first broadcast in May 2007.
- A three-part BBC Radio 4 Extra adaptation, read by Charlie Barnecut, first broadcast 23 April 2008.
