= Catherine Burns =

American actress (1945–2019)

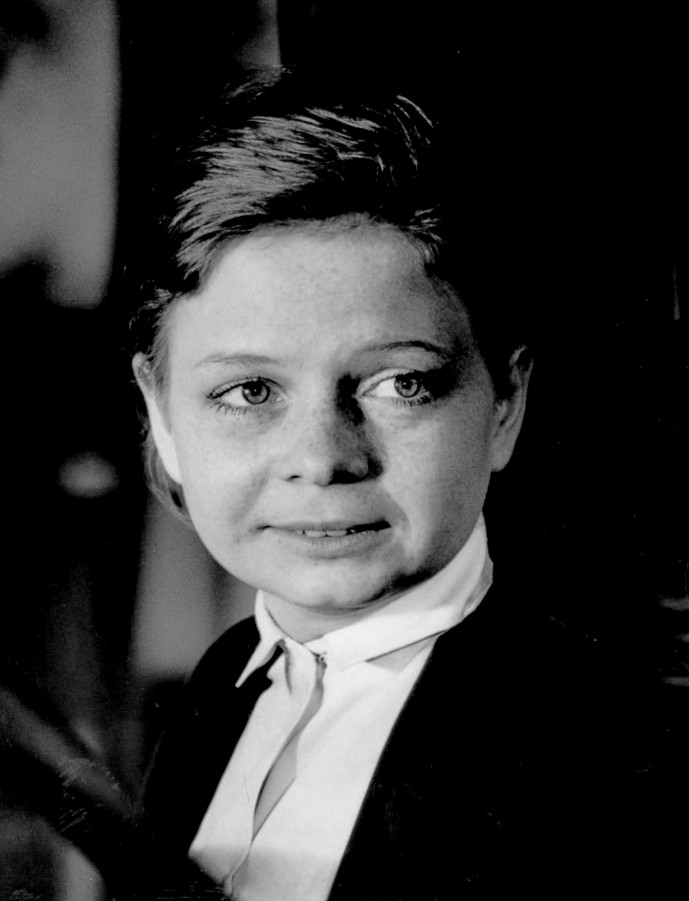
- Burns in 1974
- Born: September 25, 1945; New York City, U.S.
- Died: February 2, 2019 (aged 73); Bellingham, Washington, U.S.
- Education: Hunter College; American Academy of Dramatic Arts
- Occupations: Actress; writer
- Years active: 1967–1989
- Known for: Last Summer; Red Sky at Morning
- Spouse: Kenneth Shire (m. 1989)

Catherine Burns (September 25, 1945 – February 2, 2019) was an American actress of stage, film, radio and television. She was nominated for an Academy Award for Best Supporting Actress for her performance in Last Summer (1969).

== Early years ==
Burns was born and raised in Manhattan. She attended Hunter College High School, Hunter College and the American Academy of Dramatic Arts.

== Career ==
Burns's professional acting debut occurred in David Susskind's TV production of The Crucible (1967). She made her Broadway debut in 1968 in The Prime of Miss Jean Brodie, for which she received the Clarence Derwent Award. She also appeared in Operation Sidewinder (1970) on Broadway.

Burns made her screen debut in 1969, appearing in Last Summer as sensitive, conservative Rhoda, receiving critical acclaim and a nomination for the Academy Award for Best Supporting Actress. Despite the recognition, Burns never appeared in another theatrically released film after 1971, when she was just 26 years of age.

Her other film credits include Me, Natalie (1969) and Red Sky at Morning (1971).

=== Television ===
Burns's television debut was the role of Mary Warren in Arthur Miller's The Crucible (1967). She went on to appear as the original Cathy Craig on One Life to Live in 1969. Her other TV credits include the adaptation of Arthur Miller's play A Memory of Two Mondays (1974), the miniseries The Word (1978), and guest appearances on Love, American Style; Adam-12; Emergency!; The Mod Squad; Police Woman; The Waltons; and The Bionic Woman. She continued on television throughout the 1970s and into the mid-1980s when she turned from acting to writing.

=== Writing ===
Burns's children's book, The Winter Bird, was published by Windmill Books in 1971. Staying behind when other birds go south for the winter, a little bird discovers a new way of life in the unusual world of carousel horses. She also wrote several film scripts and stage plays with her husband, and sold scripts to the CBS soap opera Guiding Light in 1989.

== Personal life and death ==
In June 1989, Burns married Kenneth Shire. At the time, she lived on the Upper West Side of Manhattan. Later in her life, she and Shire resided in Bellingham, Washington. Little is known about Burns's life following her acting career, though according to her husband she hoped to be remembered as "a writer as well as an actress."

Burns died at age 73 on February 2, 2019, due to complications from surgical treatment for an aortic stenosis.
