= Last Summer (1969 film) =

1969 film by Frank Perry

- Theatrical release poster
- Directed by: Frank Perry
- Written by: Eleanor Perry
- Based on: Last Summer by Evan Hunter
- Produced by: Alfred W. Crown; Sidney Beckerman
- Starring: Barbara Hershey; Richard Thomas; Bruce Davison; Catherine Burns
- Cinematography: Enrique Bravo; Gerald Hirschfeld
- Edited by: Sidney Katz; Marion Kraft
- Music by: John Simon
- Production company: Alsid Productions
- Distributed by: Allied Artists
- Release date: June 10, 1969 (New York City)
- Running time: 97 minutes
- Country: United States
- Language: English
- Budget: $700,000
- Box office: $3 million (rentals)

Last Summer is a 1969 American teen drama film directed by Frank Perry and written by his then-wife Eleanor Perry, based on the 1968 novel of the same name by Evan Hunter. It stars Barbara Hershey, Richard Thomas, Bruce Davison, and Catherine Burns. The film follows the exploits of four teenagers during a summer vacation on Fire Island, New York, culminating in a disturbing act of violence.

Released in the United States on June 19, 1969, Last Summer received generally positive reviews, with Burns garnering a nomination for the Academy Award for Best Supporting Actress.

== Plot ==
Dan and Peter, two youths vacationing on Fire Island in New York, befriend a young woman named Sandy, who has found an injured seagull on a beach. While nursing the seagull back to health, the three become friends and spend the summer together. The group frequent the local cinema together, experimenting with their sexual impulses, and indulge in alcohol and marijuana. Dan and Peter, both virgins, express interest in having sex with Sandy, who they suspect is also a virgin.

The trio make the acquaintance of a slightly younger teenager, Rhoda, a socially awkward girl from Ohio who is also vacationing on the island for the summer. Though they keep Rhoda's acquaintance, the three older teenagers frequently tease her. Rhoda confides in the others that her mother died in a drowning accident several summers prior. At Sandy's urging, the three attempt to teach Rhoda how to swim, despite her being terrified of the water. Rhoda becomes close with Peter and they share a kiss. Meanwhile, the boys are disturbed upon learning that Sandy has bludgeoned the seagull to death with a rock after it bit her.

The three older friends pull a prank by arranging a dinner date between Rhoda and an older man, Anibal, through a computer dating service. After getting Anibal drunk, they abandon him to a group of local bullies despite Rhoda's protests. The event causes a rift between Rhoda and Peter.

Later, Peter leaves to go picnicking with Dan and Sandy in the forest, with the intent of having sex with Sandy. He is followed by Rhoda, who insists on tagging along. During the outing, Sandy becomes irritated by Rhoda's presence. In an act of intimidation, Sandy removes her bikini top and insists that Rhoda do the same. Rhoda refuses and attempts to leave, but Sandy goads Dan and Peter to stop her. Rhoda begs Peter to let her go, but he refuses, instead helping Sandy pin her down while Dan savagely rapes her. After the assault, Sandy and Dan return to the beach, while Peter stands on a sand dune, staring at the ocean.

== Cast ==
- Barbara Hershey as Sandy
- Richard Thomas as Peter
- Bruce Davison as Dan
- Catherine Burns as Rhoda
- Ernesto Gonzalez as Anibal
- Conrad Bain as Sidney (Note: Uncredited.)
- Peter Turgeon as Mr. Caudell
- Eileen Letchworth as Peter's mother
- Ralph Waite as Peter's father
- Ed Stevlingson as Sidney

== Production ==
=== Casting ===
Sondra Locke was originally offered the role of Sandy, but her agent declined the part without Locke's knowledge, after which Barbara Hershey was cast.

=== Filming ===
Barbara Hershey, Bruce Davison and Richard Thomas in a scene from Last Summer filmed on Fire Island, New York

The film takes place and was filmed on Fire Island, a long sandbar off Long Island with the Atlantic Ocean on one side, the Great South Bay on the other, and upper-class summer homes built on its beaches and dunes. For the final week of principal photography, production moved to Bay Shore, Long Island.

The accidental breaking of a seagull's neck during filming affected Barbara Hershey sufficiently for her to change her surname to Seagull for a couple of years. "In one scene," Hershey explained, "I had to throw the bird in the air to make her fly. We had to reshoot the scene over and over again. I could tell the bird was tired. Finally, when the scene was finished, the director, Frank Perry, told me the bird had broken her neck on the last throw." Hershey felt responsible for the bird's death and changed her stage name to "Seagull" as a tribute to the creature. "I felt her spirit enter me," she later explained. "It was the only moral thing to do."

Evan Hunter, author of the source novel, wrote a sequel novel titled Come Winter, which was released in 1973.

== Release ==
The film was given an X rating when it was first submitted to the MPAA due to the scene that depicted Rhoda (Catherine Burns)'s rape. Last Summer was one of a handful of high-profile X-rated movies that were released in 1969, along with the Best Picture Oscar winner Midnight Cowboy and Haskell Wexler's docudrama Medium Cool. The scene was edited shortly after its initial theatrical release so the film could receive an R-rating, though this version still contained nudity and strong language.

When the film was occasionally broadcast for television, a further-censored PG-rated version was presented, which cuts all nudity and heavily edits the scene of Rhoda's rape. The R-rated version is the one distributed for the VHS release.

=== Restoration ===
All original 35mm prints of the film were lost for years. In 2001, a 16mm print was located at the National Film and Sound Archive of Australia after a two-year search and was brought to Los Angeles. It was reportedly the only surviving film print of the movie at the time. The 16mm print was given a rare screening at the American Cinematheque's Egyptian Theatre in Los Angeles in 2012. On June 4, 2017, the print also received a screening at New York City's Quad Cinema. A 35mm print of the full uncut film was later found and screened by the BFI National Archive in June 2025.

A new restoration had its world premiere on March 29, 2026, at the American Cinematheque's Aero Theatre in Santa Monica, with Hershey and Davison in attendance for a Q&A session.

=== Home media ===
Key Video released Last Summer on VHS in 1985. The Warner Archive Collection announced a forthcoming Blu-ray edition of the film featuring its new restoration, would be released on June 30, 2026. Due to a "minor manufacturing glitch", the release was delayed to July 14, 2026.

== Soundtrack ==
The film's soundtrack was released by Warner Bros.-Seven Arts (WS 1791).

=== Track listing ===
1. "Last Summer Theme" (John Simon)
2. "Temptation, Lust And Laziness" (Simon)
3. "Drivin' Daisy" (Simon)
4. "Cordelia" (Simon)
5. "Sonuvagun" (Simon)
6. "Hal, The Handyman" (Simon)
7. "Beach Romp" (Simon)
8. "The Subtle Evanescence Of Now" (Collin Walcott)
9. "Lay Your Love On Me" (Simon)
10. "Magnetic Mama" (Simon)
11. "Safari Mary" (Simon)
12. "Firehouse Blues" (Simon)

=== Personnel ===
- Vocals: Buddy Bruno, Henry Diltz, Ray Draper, Cass Elliot, Cyrus Faryar, Levon Helm, Lenne Hill, John Simon
- Guitars: Mike Deasy, Levon Helm. Banjo: Henry Diltz.
  Mandolin: Levon Helm. Sitar: Collin Walcott
- Bass: Harvey Brooks, Rick Danko, Larry Knechtel, John Simon
- Keyboards: John Simon
- Drums: Hal Blaine, Levon Helm, Paul Humphrey
- Percussion: Collin Walcott
- Harmonica: Richard Manuel
- Saxophone: Plas Johnson
- Horns: Ray Draper, Garth Hudson, John Simon, Marvin Stamm
- Strings: Harry Lookofsky, Peter Pilafian
- Additional: Aunt Mary's Transcendental Slip & Lurch Band, The Electric Meatball (while credited, these bands apparently did not exist outside of this recording).

== Reception ==
=== Critical response ===
Last Summer received positive reviews. Roger Ebert gave the movie four stars, writing:

From time to time you find yourself wondering if there will ever be a movie that understands life the way you've experienced it. There are good movies about other people's lives, but rarely a movie that recalls, if only for a scene or two, the sense and flavor of life the way you remember it.

Adolescence is a period that most people, I imagine, remember rather well. For the first time in your life important things were happening to you; you were growing up; what mattered to you made a difference...[On] top of the desire to be brave and honorable, there was also the compelling desire to be accepted, to be admitted to membership in that adolescent society defined only by those excluded from it...

Frank Perry's Last Summer is about exactly such years and days, about exactly that time in the life of four 15- or 16-year-old adolescents, and it is one of the finest, truest, most deeply felt movies in my experience.

Stephen Allen of the Courier-Post praised the film's young cast as "uniformly excellent" and heralded the film as "probably the best movie about adolescence in America that has ever been made." Bernard Drew of the Democrat and Chronicle was also impressed by the film, describing it as "so achingly real, so sensitively written, so sharply directed and amazingly acted by a quartet of young players that [it] stands, in mid-season, as one of the finest films of the year."

On Rotten Tomatoes, the film holds a rating of 82% from 11 reviews.

=== Accolades ===
Award/association	Year	Category	Recipient(s) and nominee(s)	Result	Ref.
Academy Awards	1970	Best Supporting Actress	Catherine Burns	Nominated	
Kansas City Film Critics Circle	1969	Best Supporting Actress	Catherine Burns	Won	
Laurel Awards	1970	Sleeper of the Year	Last Summer	Won	
Laurel Awards	1970	Female New Face	Barbara Hershey	6th place	
Mar del Plata International Film Festival	1970	Best Director	Frank Perry	Won	
Mar del Plata International Film Festival	1970	Best Film	Last Summer	Nominated	
Mar del Plata International Film Festival	1970	FIPRESCI Prize	Last Summer	Won	
New York Film Critics Circle Awards	1970	Best Supporting Actress	Catherine Burns	Nominated	

== See also ==
- List of American films of 1969

== Sources ==
- Martin, Len D. (2001). The Allied Artists Checklist: The Feature Films and Short Subjects of Allied Artists Pictures Corporation, 1947-1978. Jefferson, North Carolina: McFarland & Company. ISBN 978-1-476-60959-1.
- Mell, Eila (2005). Casting Might-Have-Beens: A Film by Film Directory of Actors Considered for Roles Given to Others. Jefferson, North Carolina: McFarland & Company. ISBN 978-1-476-60976-8.
