= Last Summer (novel) =

1968 coming-of-age novel by Evan Hunter

- Doubleday 1st Edition (hardcover)
- Author: Evan Hunter
- Language: English
- Genre: Psychological thriller Coming of age
- Publisher: Doubleday
- Publication date: 1968
- Publication place: United States
- ISBN: 9789997517210 (hardcover edition)
- OCLC: 1035915177
- Followed by: Come Winter (sequel)

Last Summer is a 1968 American coming-of-age psychological thriller novel by Evan Hunter. The book loosely chronicles a summer on Fire Island shared by three affluent but troubled adolescents who become increasingly cruel and hedonistic as they experiment with drugs, sex, bizarre social pranks and alcohol, leading them to eventually commit a heinous act against a companion of theirs. The book was adapted into a film by the same title in 1969, and was followed by a sequel, Come Winter, in 1973. The character David's name is changed to Dan in the film adaptation.

== Plot ==
Shy, reserved unreliable narrator Peter reflects upon his recent summer vacation on Fire Island, which he spent with David, a childhood friend, and Sandy, a mysterious, eccentric and manipulative girl who bonds with Peter and David after they aid her in saving the life of an injured seagull that Sandy rescues on the beach. The boys are enamoured with the physically-attractive and fun-loving, hedonistic Sandy and their meeting quickly becomes an intense friendship during which the trio consume beer and share deep secrets about one another. Their affluent urban parents, on vacation in the nearby cottages, largely ignore them and engage in their own hedonistic pursuits; Sandy confides in the boys that her stepfather, a man nicknamed "Snow White" for his pallid skin, molested her when nobody was looking and made lecherous remarks at her. Peter and David are shocked at Sandy's casual sexuality, such as taking her bikini top off in front of them, and they engage in casual foreplay and other sexual games with her while also exploring the beach and nearby forest, boating, swimming and teaching Sandy's "pet" seagull to fly. A homely, conservative and socially-awkward youth named Rhoda, also on vacation with her father, pesters the other three teens about being cruel to the seagull, but they snub her.

Sandy and Peter partake in a prank by filling out a form for a computer dating service, believing that they'll confuse the service comedically by entering in odd details and ethnically-ambiguous information. Sandy is shown to be increasingly manipulative, clever and callous towards others, using her own sexuality, as well as alcohol and drugs, to manipulate the boys while unbeknownst to her, they manipulate her in turn in the hopes that one day they'll be able to "lay" her although through all of this, an unspoken respect and hierarchy develops under which Sandy is the de facto leader. Feeling betrayed by the seagull when it accidentally bites her, Sandy crushes the seagull to death by beating it with a rock, hiding the mutilated body in the forest. Peter and David are horrified, not that she hurt the seagull but that she lied to them about it, establishing that they must have no secrets from one another. The trio come across a gang of burly local men who accost Sandy; they tease the men and flee, making it safely to the ferry back to Fire Island and escaping. Sandy also engages in eccentric activities such as observing two gay men having secret sex on the beach. Rhoda runs into them again and the teens begrudgingly accept her presence, but slowly begin to welcome her into their social circle. On a rainy day, after partaking in the use of marijuana and getting high, Peter develops a crush on Rhoda despite her prudishness and Sandy, learning that Rhoda's mother died in a drowning incident while swimming, decides to make the awkward girl her project by introducing her to more liberal concepts and buying her a bikini to replace the "creepy" modest one-piece bathing suit that she had been wearing previously, which David and Peter believe looks like a bathing suit that an elderly woman would wear.

To Sandy's surprise, the computer dating service actually ends up pairing her with someone, a shy, nerdy but kind-hearted Puerto Rican man named Anibal. Sandy and the boys coerce Rhoda, who has the same eye and hair colour as the dating service was told, to go on a date with Anibal as a joke. Rhoda likes Anibal and immediately feels bad about tricking the nice man, and is horrified when she realizes that Sandy and the boys, who tagged along on the date, are purposely getting Anibal drunk on mixed drinks at the restaurant they attend, getting him to then dance ridiculously with them. Sandy repeatedly teases Anibal by calling him "Annabelle" (a girl's name), and the teens then lure the man outside, where the abusive men they had run into before recognize them and chase after them. Rhoda tries to rescue Anibal but is dragged away by the three teens, leaving Anibal to be beaten up severely by the men, who catch him and proceed to attack him. Furious, Rhoda remains on the beach the next day and refuses to swim (despite Peter having helped her overcome her aquaphobia recently and Sandy buying her the new bikini). Rhoda, who had bitten Sandy's hand the prior night in an attempt to break away from her and help Anibal, finally decides to explore the forest with the other teens due to the hot, sticky weather. In the shade of the forest, they drink beer and share morbid humour, disgusting Rhoda, who refuses to drink the beer herself because she doesn't like the taste of hops. All of a sudden, seeming to trigger Sandy's rage, Sandy pins the girl to the ground while the boys strip her bikini off and proceed to violently take turns raping her. When the rape is over, they silently trudge out of the forest and back to their families' respective cottages in the sunset, leaving a traumatized Rhoda lying there. The book concludes with the summer ending and the teens returning back to their own respective communities, but Peter is still haunted by what occurred and contemplates nostalgia and revulsion.

== Themes ==
Last Summer explores themes of hedonism, cruelty, friendship, adolescence, sexuality, human curiosity, the division between liberal and conservative values, parental neglect, violence and bullying. The characters engage in increasingly cruel, abusive behaviour as the summer continues and despite coming from wealthy families, they struggle to find an outlet for their own frustrations, curiosity and burgeoning sadism. Sandy in particular is a major plot focus as both an attractive "girl next-door" and an unpleasant, off-putting personality; for example, she openly discloses being constipated in front of Peter and David and indulges in eating a large bag of prunes in front of them in an attempt to move her bowels. Rhoda, more conservative, mature, inexperienced and prudish about sex and nudity, is the opposite of Sandy and the two girls inevitably clash in personality to the point of irritating Sandy and triggering a bout of extreme sexual violence. Peter and David, who've been fantasizing about having sex with Sandy all summer, instead take turns raping Rhoda only to then completely abandon her and follow Sandy back home with absolutely no empathy for Rhoda or fear of legal consequences for the act. The book also explores the looseness, confusion and fun of adolescence, exploring the lives of the teens as they come of age away from school, work or other outside influences.

== Reception ==
Although controversial for its shocking content and for the explicit film adaptation that followed, Last Summer received largely mixed reviews from critics and retained a cult following, with Erin E. MacDonald, a critic in a literary review of Even Hunter's published bibliography, referring to Last Summer as Hunter's "best work". Kirkus Reviews was less positive, saying that the book was a "slow burn of prurience and casual cruelty symptomatic of the times" and criticizing the novel for having no staying power. Discovery reviewer and author Paula Galvan rated the book positively, calling it "a disturbing story about teens without boundaries". A tie-in edition to coincide with the 1969 film adaptation of Last Summer was released in mass-market paperback format by Signet, which depicted imagery from the film itself including an overarching seagull and a picture of Rhoda standing alone and away from her three friends. This was followed by a second film tie-in (it was a rarity at the time to publish more than one tie-in edition); this variant had a yellow-beige cover with a photographic screenshot from the film.

== Sequel ==
1st edition hardcover of Come Winter

Come Winter, set when Peter, David and Sandy are all grown adults, was a sequel published in 1973. The sequel, set at a ski lodge, reveals that all three of the teens are dysfunctional and mentally-unstable as adults, with Peter regularly seeing a psychiatrist who tries to aid him in coming to terms with the sexual violation of Rhoda (who has cut off contact with the trio). Sandy reveals that she was told she may be a sociopath, although she does exhibit a strong moral code when two new Jewish friends she meets at the ski lodge are mistreated and face antisemitic comments, revealing that Sandy won't tolerate prejudice and that she is fiercely loyal to her friends provided that they never betray her. In an act of vengeance, she sets up an "accident" which leaves one of the bigots who harassed her friends severely disabled to the point of permanent paralysis. David does not play as large a role in the sequel. As with Last Summer, Come Winter is told from Peter's point of view.

=== Reception ===
The Burlington Free Press called Come Winter "an unforgettable exploration into the nature of evil." The Los Angeles Times described it as a "compelling, fascinating novel".
