= Criminal Conversation =

- Author: Evan Hunter
- Language: English
- Publication date: 1994

Criminal Conversation is a novel published in 1994 by Evan Hunter, set in Brooklyn, New York.

== Plot ==
Sarah Welles, 34, a private school English teacher, is happily married to Assistant District Attorney Michael Welles, Organized Crime, Manhattan. Michael Welles is chasing suspected Mafia-connected businessman Andrew Faviola, 28, son of jailed don Anthony and himself pushing to establish a new territory by the creation of "moon rock", a brand of cocaine and opium with far-reaching interests.

Sarah meets Andrew Faviola while she is on holiday in the Caribbean. Little does she know that after he saves her pre-teen daughter from drowning, he will come after her next—or that their trysts at his apartment are being taped by Michael (her husband) in an effort to gain criminal evidence of Andrew's mafia activities. When Michael realises that the "unknown blonde" is his wife, their marriage and relationship is under threat.
