= The Mugger (novel) =

1956 novel by Evan Hunter

- First edition
- Author: Evan Hunter (under pseud. "Ed McBain")
- Language: English
- Series: 87th Precinct
- Genre: Crime novel
- Publication date: 1956
- Publication place: United States
- Media type: Paperback
- Pages: 153 pages Revised edition 178 Pages
- Preceded by: Cop Hater
- Followed by: The Pusher

The Mugger is a 1956 novel by Ed McBain, the second in his 87th Precinct series. It was adapted for a film of the same name in 1958. In 2002 the author wrote an introduction to this and to his earlier novel Cop Hater when both were published in an omnibus edition.

== Plot ==
A mugger is attacking women in Isola. Carella is on his honeymoon, and the case is being handled by Detective Hal Willis. A second plot involves Bert Kling, a patrolman hunting a killer.

== Characters ==
This novel introduces the character of Claire Townsend, Bert Kling's girlfriend (killed in the novel Lady, Lady, I Did It). Bert gets a promotion to Detective 3rd Grade. Also introduced in this novel are the characters of Detective 2nd Grade Eileen Burke and homicide detectives Monoghan and Monroe.
