= Evan Hunter =

American author and screenwriter

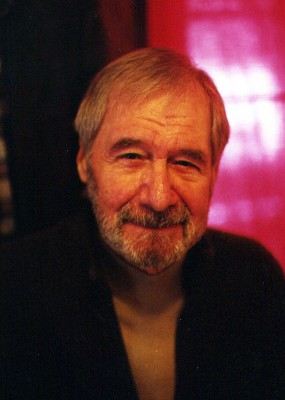
- Hunter in March 2001
- Born: Salvatore Albert Lombino; October 15, 1926; New York City, U.S.
- Died: July 6, 2005 (aged 78); Weston, Connecticut, U.S.
- Occupations: Novelist; short story writer; screenwriter
- Spouse(s): Anita Melnick, 1949 (divorced); Mary Vann Finley, 1973 (divorced); Dragica Dimitrijevic, 1997 (until his death)
- Children: 3 sons; 1 stepdaughter
- Writing career
- Pen name: John Abbott, Curt Cannon, Hunt Collins, Ezra Hannon, Ed McBain, Richard Marsten
- Period: 1951–2005
- Genres: Crime fiction, mystery fiction, pornography, science fiction
- Notable work: 87th Precinct series

Evan Hunter (born Salvatore Albert Lombino; October 15, 1926 – July 6, 2005) was an American author of crime and mystery fiction. He is best known as the author of the 87th Precinct novels, published under the pen name Ed McBain, which are considered staples of the police procedural genre.

His other notable works include The Blackboard Jungle, a semi-autobiographical novel about life in a troubled inner-city school, which was adapted into a hit 1955 film of the same name. He also wrote the screenplay for Alfred Hitchcock’s 1963 film The Birds, based on the Daphne du Maurier short story.

Lombino published a handful of short stories under his birth name before adopting Evan Hunter in 1952 as both his legal name and the name he used for general fiction. He initially used Richard Marsten for genre fiction, but this fell by the wayside after the 87th Precinct series was launched under the name of Ed McBain. He also published one novel each as John Abbott, Curt Cannon and Ezra Hannon, and two novels as Hunt Collins. Most of the books he wrote as Marsten and under miscellaneous pseudonyms were later reissued as the work of Ed McBain.

== Life ==
=== Early life ===
Salvatore Lombino was born and raised in New York City. He lived in East Harlem until age 12, when his family moved to the Bronx. He attended Olinville Junior High School (later Richard R. Green Middle School #113), then Evander Childs High School (now Evander Childs Educational Campus), before winning a New York Art Students League scholarship. Later, he was admitted as an art student at Cooper Union. Lombino served in the United States Navy during World War II and wrote several short stories while serving aboard a destroyer in the Pacific. However, none of these stories was published until after he had established himself as an author in the 1950s.

After the war, Lombino returned to New York and attended Hunter College, where he majored in English and psychology, with minors in dramatics and education, and graduated Phi Beta Kappa in 1950. He published a weekly column in the Hunter College newspaper as "S. A. Lombino". In 1981, Lombino was inducted into the Hunter College Hall of Fame, where he was honored for outstanding professional achievement.

While looking to start a career as a writer, Lombino took a variety of jobs, including 17 days as a teacher at Bronx Vocational High School in September 1950. This experience would later form the basis for his novel The Blackboard Jungle (1954), written under the pen name Evan Hunter, which was adapted into the film Blackboard Jungle (1955).

In 1951, Lombino took a job as an executive editor for the Scott Meredith Literary Agency, working with authors such as Poul Anderson, Arthur C. Clarke, Lester del Rey, Richard S. Prather, and P. G. Wodehouse. He made his first professional short story sale the same year, a science-fiction tale titled "Welcome, Martians!", credited to S. A. Lombino.

=== Name change and pen names ===
Soon after his initial sale, Lombino sold stories under the pen names Evan Hunter and Hunt Collins. The name Evan Hunter is generally believed to have been derived from two schools he attended, Evander Childs High School and Hunter College, although the author himself would never confirm that. (He did confirm that Hunt Collins was derived from Hunter College.) Lombino legally changed his name to Evan Hunter in May 1952, after an editor told him that a novel he wrote would sell more copies if credited to Evan Hunter than to S. A. Lombino. Thereafter, he used the name Evan Hunter both personally and professionally.

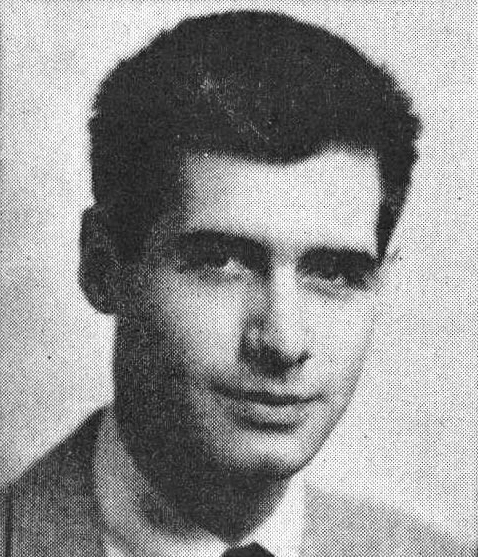
Evan Hunter c. 1953

As Evan Hunter, he gained notice with his novel The Blackboard Jungle (1954) dealing with juvenile crime and the New York City public school system. The film adaptation followed in 1955.

During this era, Hunter also wrote a great deal of genre fiction. He was advised by his agents that publishing too much fiction under the Hunter byline, or publishing any crime fiction as Evan Hunter, might weaken his literary reputation. Consequently, during the 1950s Hunter used the pseudonyms Curt Cannon, Hunt Collins, and Richard Marsten for much of his crime fiction. A prolific author in several genres, Hunter also published approximately two dozen science fiction stories and four science-fiction novels between 1951 and 1956 under the names S. A. Lombino, Evan Hunter, Richard Marsten, D. A. Addams, and Ted Taine.

Ed McBain, his best known pseudonym, was first used with Cop Hater (1956), the first novel in the 87th Precinct crime series. Hunter revealed that he was McBain in 1958 but continued to use the pseudonym for decades, notably for the 87th Precinct series and the Matthew Hope detective series. He retired the pen names Addams, Cannon, Collins, Marsten, and Taine around 1960. From then on crime novels were generally attributed to McBain and other sorts of fiction to Hunter. Reprints of crime-oriented stories and novels written in the 1950s previously attributed to other pseudonyms were reissued under the McBain byline. Hunter stated that the division of names allowed readers to know what to expect: McBain novels had a consistent writing style, while Hunter novels were more varied.

Under the Hunter name, novels steadily appeared throughout the 1960s, 1970s, and early 1980s, including Come Winter (1973) and Lizzie (1984). Hunter was also successful as screenwriter for film and television. He wrote the screenplay for the Alfred Hitchcock film The Birds (1963), loosely adapted from Daphne du Maurier's eponymous 1952 novelette. Following The Birds, Hunter was again hired by Hitchcock to complete an in-progress script adapting Winston Graham's novel Marnie. However, Hunter and the director disagreed on how to treat the novel's rape scene, and the writer was sacked. Hunter's other screenplays included Strangers When We Meet (1960), based on his own 1958 novel; and Fuzz (1972), based on his eponymous 1968 87th Precinct novel, which he had written as Ed McBain.

After having thirteen 87th Precinct novels published from 1956 to 1960, further 87th Precinct novels appeared at a rate of approximately one a year until his death. Additionally, NBC ran a police drama called 87th Precinct during the 1961–62 season, based on McBain's work.

From 1978 to 1998, McBain published a series about lawyer Matthew Hope; books in this series appeared every year or two, and usually had titles derived from well-known children's stories. For about a decade, from 1984 to 1994, Hunter published no fiction under his own name. In 2000, a novel called Candyland appeared that was credited to both Hunter and McBain. The two-part novel opened in Hunter's psychologically based narrative voice before switching to McBain's customary police procedural style.

Aside from McBain, Hunter used at least two other pseudonyms for his fiction after 1960: Doors (1975), which was originally attributed to Ezra Hannon before being reissued as a work by McBain, and Scimitar (1992), which was credited to John Abbott.

Hunter gave advice to other authors in his article "Dig in and get it done: no-nonsense advice from a prolific author (aka Ed McBain) on starting and finishing your novel". In it, he advised authors to "find their voice for it is the most important thing in any novel".

=== Dean Hudson controversy ===
Hunter was long rumored to have written an unknown number of pornographic novels, as Dean Hudson, for William Hamling's publishing houses. Hunter adamantly and consistently denied writing any books as Hudson until he died. However, apparently his agent Scott Meredith sold books to Hamling's company as Hunter's work (for attribution as "Dean Hudson") and received payments for these books in cash. While notable, it is not definitive proof: Meredith almost certainly forwarded novels to Hamling by any number of authors, claiming these novels were by Hunter simply to make a sale. Ninety-three novels were published under the Hudson name from 1961 to 1969, and even the most avid proponents of the Hunter-as-Hudson theory do not believe Hunter is responsible for all 93.

=== Personal life ===
He had three sons: Richard Hunter, an author, speaker, retired advisor to chief information officers on business value and risk issues, and harmonica player; Mark Hunter, an academic, educator, investigative reporter, and author; and Ted Hunter, a painter, who died in 2006.

=== Death ===
A heavy smoker for many decades, Hunter had three heart attacks over a number of years (his first in 1987) and needed heart surgery. A precancerous lesion was found on his larynx in 1992. This was removed, but the cancer later returned. In 2005, Hunter died in Weston, Connecticut, from laryngeal cancer. He was 78.

=== Awards ===
- Edgar Award nomination for Best Short Story, "The Last Spin" (Manhunt, Sept. 1956)
- Edgar Award nomination for Best Motion Picture, The Birds (1964)
- Edgar Award nomination for Best Short Story, "Sardinian Incident" (Playboy, Oct. 1971)
- Grand Master, Mystery Writers of America (1986)
- Diamond Dagger, British Crime Writers Assn (first American recipient, 1998)
- Anthony Award nomination for Best Series of the Century (2000)
- Edgar Award nomination for Best Novel, Money, Money, Money (2002)

== Works ==
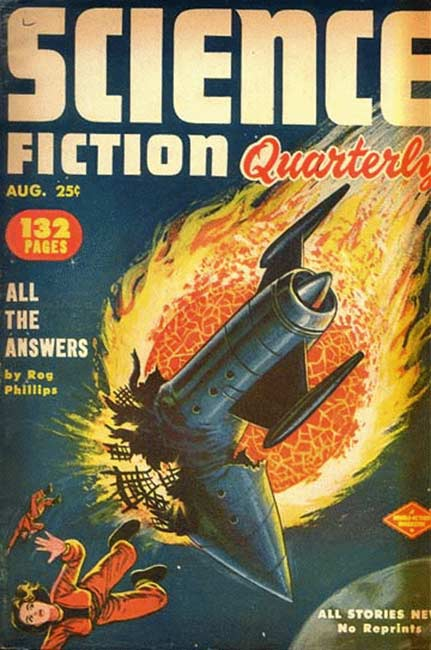
Hunter's "Silent Partner" was the cover story on the August 1952 issue of Science Fiction Quarterly, credited to S. A. Lombino

=== Novels ===
Year	Title	Credited author	Series	Notes
1952	Find The Feathered Serpent	Evan Hunter		For young readers
1952	The Evil Sleep!	Evan Hunter		Reissued as So Nude, So Dead by Richard Marsten in 1956 and by Ed McBain in 2015
1953	Don't Crowd Me	Evan Hunter		
1953	Danger: Dinosaurs!	Richard Marsten		For young readers
1953	Rocket to Luna	Richard Marsten		For young readers
1954	The Blackboard Jungle	Evan Hunter		
1954	Runaway Black	Richard Marsten		Reissued as by Ed McBain
1954	Cut Me In	Hunt Collins		Reissued as The Proposition by Hunt Collins and as Cut Me In by Ed McBain
1955	Murder in the Navy	Richard Marsten		Reissued as Death of a Nurse by Ed McBain
1956	Second Ending	Evan Hunter		
1956	Cop Hater	Ed McBain	87th Precinct	
1956	The Mugger	Ed McBain	87th Precinct	
1956	The Pusher	Ed McBain	87th Precinct	Filmed as The Pusher (1960)
1956	Tomorrow's World	Hunt Collins		Reissued as Tomorrow and Tomorrow by Hunt Collins and as Sphere by Ed McBain
1957	The Con Man	Ed McBain	87th Precinct	
1957	Killer's Choice	Ed McBain	87th Precinct	
1957	Vanishing Ladies	Richard Marsten		Reissued as by Ed McBain
1957	The Spiked Heel	Richard Marsten		
1958	Strangers When We Meet	Evan Hunter		
1958	The April Robin Murders	Craig Rice and Ed McBain		Left unfinished when Rice died and completed by Hunter as McBain
1958	Killer's Payoff	Ed McBain	87th Precinct	
1958	Lady Killer	Ed McBain	87th Precinct	
1958	Even The Wicked	Richard Marsten		Reissued as by Ed McBain
1958	I'm Cannon—For Hire	Curt Cannon		Reissued with revisions as The Gutter and the Grave by Ed McBain
1959	A Matter of Conviction	Evan Hunter		Filmed as The Young Savages (1961)
1959	The Remarkable Harry	Evan Hunter		For young readers
1959	Big Man	Richard Marsten		Reissued as by Ed McBain
1959	Killer's Wedge	Ed McBain	87th Precinct	
1959	'Til Death	Ed McBain	87th Precinct	
1959	King's Ransom	Ed McBain	87th Precinct	
1960	Give the Boys a Great Big Hand	Ed McBain	87th Precinct	
1960	The Heckler	Ed McBain	87th Precinct	
1960	See Them Die	Ed McBain	87th Precinct	
1961	Lady, Lady I Did It!	Ed McBain	87th Precinct	
1961	Mothers and Daughters	Evan Hunter		
1961	The Wonderful Button	Evan Hunter		For young readers
1962	The Empty Hours	Ed McBain	87th Precinct	Three novellas
1962	Like Love	Ed McBain	87th Precinct	
1963	Ten Plus One	Ed McBain	87th Precinct	
1964	Buddwing	Evan Hunter		
1964	Ax	Ed McBain	87th Precinct	
1964	He Who Hesitates	Ed McBain	87th Precinct	
1965	Doll	Ed McBain	87th Precinct	
1965	The Sentries	Ed McBain		
1965	Me and Mr. Stenner	Evan Hunter		For young readers
1966	The Paper Dragon	Evan Hunter		
1966	80 Million Eyes	Ed McBain	87th Precinct	
1967	A Horse's Head	Evan Hunter		
1968	Last Summer	Evan Hunter		Filmed as Last Summer (1969)
1968	Fuzz	Ed McBain	87th Precinct	
1969	Sons	Evan Hunter		
1969	Shotgun	Ed McBain	87th Precinct	
1970	Jigsaw	Ed McBain	87th Precinct	Filmed for television as the Columbo episode "Undercover" (1994)
1971	Nobody Knew They Were There	Evan Hunter		
1971	Hail, Hail, the Gang's All Here	Ed McBain	87th Precinct	
1972	Every Little Crook And Nanny	Evan Hunter		
1972	Let's Hear It for the Deaf Man	Ed McBain	87th Precinct	
1972	Sadie When She Died	Ed McBain	87th Precinct	
1973	Come Winter	Evan Hunter		
1973	Hail to the Chief	Ed McBain	87th Precinct	
1974	Streets Of Gold	Evan Hunter		
1974	Bread	Ed McBain	87th Precinct	
1975	Where There's Smoke	Ed McBain		
1975	Blood Relatives	Ed McBain	87th Precinct	
1975	Doors	Ezra Hannon		Reissued as by Ed McBain
1976	So Long as You Both Shall Live	Ed McBain	87th Precinct	Filmed for television as the Columbo episode "No Time to Die" (1992)
1976	The Chisholms	Evan Hunter		
1976	Guns	Ed McBain		
1977	Long Time No See	Ed McBain	87th Precinct	
1977	Goldilocks	Ed McBain	Matthew Hope	
1979	Walk Proud	Evan Hunter		Reissued as Gangs! by Ed McBain
1979	Calypso	Ed McBain	87th Precinct	
1980	Ghosts	Ed McBain	87th Precinct	
1981	Love, Dad	Evan Hunter		
1981	Heat	Ed McBain	87th Precinct	
1981	Rumpelstiltskin	Ed McBain	Matthew Hope	
1982	Beauty and the Beast	Ed McBain	Matthew Hope	
1983	Far from the Sea	Evan Hunter		
1983	Ice	Ed McBain	87th Precinct	Filmed for television as Ed McBain's 87th Precinct: Ice (1996)
1984	Lizzie	Evan Hunter		A fictional life of Lizzie Borden
1984	Lightning	Ed McBain	87th Precinct	Filmed for television as Ed McBain's 87th Precinct: Lightning (1995)
1984	Jack and the Beanstalk	Ed McBain	Matthew Hope	
1984	And All Through the House	Ed McBain	87th Precinct	Short story published first in Playboy, then as a slim volume; reissued in 1994 with illustrations by Victor Juhasz
1985	Eight Black Horses	Ed McBain	87th Precinct	
1985	Snow White and Rose Red	Ed McBain	Matthew Hope	
1986	Another Part of the City	Ed McBain		
1986	Cinderella	Ed McBain	Matthew Hope	
1987	Poison	Ed McBain	87th Precinct	
1987	Tricks	Ed McBain	87th Precinct	
1987	Puss in Boots	Ed McBain	Matthew Hope	
1988	The House that Jack Built	Ed McBain	Matthew Hope	
1989	Lullaby	Ed McBain	87th Precinct	
1989	Downtown	Ed McBain		UK edition, 1989; French translation, 1990; first U.S. edition, 1991
1990	Vespers	Ed McBain	87th Precinct	
1990	Three Blind Mice	Ed McBain	Matthew Hope	Filmed for television as Three Blind Mice (2001), starring Brian Dennehy
1991	Widows	Ed McBain	87th Precinct	
1992	Kiss	Ed McBain	87th Precinct	
1992	Mary, Mary	Ed McBain	Matthew Hope	
1992	Scimitar	John Abbott		
1993	Mischief	Ed McBain	87th Precinct	
1994	There Was a Little Girl	Ed McBain	Matthew Hope	
1994	Criminal Conversation	Evan Hunter		
1995	Romance	Ed McBain	87th Precinct	
1996	Privileged Conversation	Evan Hunter		
1996	Gladly The Cross-Eyed Bear	Ed McBain	Matthew Hope	
1997	Nocturne	Ed McBain	87th Precinct	
1998	The Last Best Hope	Ed McBain	Matthew Hope	
1999	The Big Bad City	Ed McBain	87th Precinct	
2000	Candyland	Evan Hunter and Ed McBain		The first part leading up to the crime is in the style of Hunter and the second part dealing with the investigation is in the style of McBain
2000	Driving Lessons	Ed McBain		
2000	The Last Dance	Ed McBain	87th Precinct	Celebrated by Hunter's publishers on both sides of the Atlantic as the fiftieth installment of the 87th Precinct series, consisting, at this point, of forty-eight novels and two volumes of short fiction (The Empty Hours and And All Through the House); five more novels would follow
2001	Money, Money, Money	Ed McBain	87th Precinct	
2002	The Moment She Was Gone	Evan Hunter		
2002	Fat Ollie's Book	Ed McBain	87th Precinct	
2004	The Frumious Bandersnatch	Ed McBain	87th Precinct	
2004	Hark!	Ed McBain	87th Precinct	
2005	Alice in Jeopardy	Ed McBain		
2005	Fiddlers	Ed McBain	87th Precinct	

=== Short story collections ===
There is some overlap between these collections. Apart from the first, each combines previously uncollected stories with stories that had already appeared in earlier volumes. Other short stories by Hunter have never appeared in book form. The name attached to the collection may not be the name attached to individual stories at the time of their original publication.

- 1956: The Jungle Kids (signed Evan Hunter)
- 1958: I Like 'Em Tough (signed Curt Cannon)
  Six stories in the first person originally signed by Evan Hunter about the private eye originally called Matt Cordell. In this collection both character and author are called Curt Cannon. Reissued in 2016 under the name of Ed McBain.
- 1960: The Last Spin and Other Stories (signed Evan Hunter)
- 1963: Happy New Year, Herbie (signed Evan Hunter)
  Includes "On the Sidewalk, Bleeding" (1957).
- 1972: The Easter Man (A Play) and Six Stories (signed Evan Hunter)
  Released in the UK as Seven, without the play and with an additional short story, "The Movie Star".
- 1982: The McBain Brief (signed Ed McBain)
- 2000: Barking at Butterflies and Other Stories (signed Ed McBain / Evan Hunter)
- 2000: Running from Legs and Other Stories (signed Ed McBain / Evan Hunter)
- 2006: Learning to Kill (signed Ed McBain)
  This posthumous collection of twenty-five early stories, mixing favorites and rarities, is a useful introduction to Hunter's work in the genre.

=== Collections of extracts ===
- 1988: McBain's Ladies : The Women of the 87th Precinct (signed Ed McBain)
- 1989: McBain's Ladies, Too : More Women of the 87th Precinct (signed Ed McBain)

=== Autobiographical ===
- 1998: Me and Hitch! (by Evan Hunter)
- 2005: Let's Talk (by Evan Hunter)

=== Plays ===
Hunter's papers include several unproduced plays. Three that did reach the stage are:

- The Easter Man (1964)
  Created at the Birmingham Repertory Theatre in June 1964 before transferring to the Globe (now Gielgud) in London in July. Revived in revised form as A Race of Hairy Men! at Henry Miller's Theater in New York in April 1965.
- The Conjuror (1969)
  Created at the Lydia Mendelssohn Theatre, Ann Arbor, in November 1969.
- Stalemate (1975)
  Created in New York in 1975.

=== Screenplays ===
- Strangers When We Meet (1960)
- The Birds (1963)
- Fuzz (1972)
- Walk Proud (1979)

=== Teleplays ===
- The Chisholms, CBS miniseries starring Robert Preston (1979)
- The Legend of Walks Far Woman (1980)
- Dream West (1986)

=== As editor ===
- 2000: The Best American Mystery Stories (by Evan Hunter)
- 2005: Transgressions (collection of crime novellas by various authors edited by Ed McBain)

=== Incomplete novels ===
- Becca in Jeopardy (Near completion at the time of Hunter's death. Apparently to remain unpublished.)

=== Film adaptations ===
- Blackboard Jungle (1955) by Richard Brooks, from Blackboard Jungle
- The Young Savages (1961) by John Frankenheimer, from A Matter of Conviction
- High and Low (1963) by Akira Kurosawa, from King's Ransom
- Mister Buddwing (1966) by Delbert Mann, from Buddwing
- Last Summer (1969) by Frank Perry, from Last Summer
- Sans mobile apparent (1971) by Philippe Labro, from Ten Plus One
- Every Little Crook and Nanny (1972) by Cy Howard, from Every Little Crook and Nanny
- Blood Relatives (1978) by Claude Chabrol, from Blood Relatives
- Lonely Heart (1981) by Kon Ichikawa, from Lady, Lady, I Did It
