= Mugged (Flight of the Conchords) =

- Flight of the Conchords episode
- Episode no.: Season 1 Episode 3
- Directed by: James Bobin
- Written by: James Bobin; Jemaine Clement; Bret McKenzie
- Production code: 103
- Original air date: July 1, 2007

Guest appearances
- Luther Creek (Mickey); Lenny Venito (John); Kelly Taffe (Police Officer); Richard Thorne (Reuben); Eugene Mirman (Eugene); Marilyn Torres (Jemaine's date); Diana Bologna (John's date)

Episode chronology
← Previous "Bret Gives Up the Dream"	Next → "Yoko"

"Mugged" is the third episode of the HBO comedy series Flight of the Conchords. It first aired in the United States on Sunday, July 1, 2007.

== Plot synopsis ==
Bret and Jemaine are mugged and chased by two thugs. During the pursuit, Jemaine's clothes get caught on a fence. Rather than helping Jemaine, Bret leaves him to fend for himself. Consequently, Jemaine injures his arm and spends two days in jail with John, one of the muggers. While in jail, Jemaine bonds with John, who is also dealing with the pain of having been abandoned, as his partner in crime ran from the scene when the authorities arrived. In his efforts to reconcile with an angry Jemaine, Bret decides to get Jemaine's camera-phone (which is a phone glued to a camera, rather than a mobile phone with camera abilities) back from the muggers.

== Songs ==
The following songs are featured in this episode.

=== "Hiphopopotamus vs. Rhymenoceros" ===
"Hiphopopotamus vs. Rhymenoceros" takes place during the mugging. Jemaine and Bret attempt to fend off the muggers with bluster then launch into a gangsta rap song. It parodies various rap clichés such as references to "bitches" and "hoes", though in a deliberately tame manner ("there ain't no party like my nana's tea party"). The video is filmed using common hip hop music video techniques such as low camera angles and rapid movement of the performers towards and away from the camera.

This song was #67 in the 2008 Triple J Hottest 100.

=== "Think About It" ===
"Think About It" begins as Bret leaves to track down Mickey the mugger in an attempt to get Jemaine's camera phone back. The song exhorts people to think about society's ills, including comedic references to violence, AIDS, and sweatshop labor.

In an interview on the National Public Radio program Fresh Air on 14 June 2007, the band stated that in this song they were trying to combine the styles of both Marvin Gaye and The Black Eyed Peas song "Where Is the Love?".

== Cultural references ==
During a band meeting, Murray says to say "hey, I'm walking here", claiming it's "what New Yorkers say". The line is from the film Midnight Cowboy.

When describing his friend, one of the muggers says the line: "... he's a psycho killer. Qu'est-ce que c'est?" This is a reference to the 1977 Talking Heads song "Psycho Killer" in which the lines "Psycho killer/Qu'est-ce que c'est?" are featured prominently in the chorus.

When the guys are getting mugged and Mickey pulls out a knife, Jemaine says "that's not a knife". Bret replies "yeah, that's, that's a knife". "Oh, it is a knife", says Jemaine, then they both run away. This is a reference to the famous scene in the 1986 Australian film, Crocodile Dundee, in which Mick Dundee is accosted by a mugger on his first visit to New York. The would-be mugger threatens him with a switch blade. Dundee says "that's not a knife", then pulls out his own knife, a large Bowie, and says "that's a knife", causing the mugger to flee.

== Filming locations ==
- The place where Bret and Jemaine are mugged is on the corner of Scholes Street and Morgan Avenue in East Williamsburg, Brooklyn, at coordinates 40°42′36.2″N 73°56′1.1″W.
