= The Diary of Ellen Rimbauer (disambiguation) =

The Diary of Ellen Rimbauer: My Life at Rose Red is a 2001 horror novel by Ridley Pearson.

The Diary of Ellen Rimbauer may also refer to:

- The Diary of Ellen Rimbauer (film), a 2003 television miniseries adaptation of the novel, and prequel to Rose Red
- Rose Red (miniseries), a 2002 television miniseries by Stephen King
