= List of television shows set in Seattle =

This is a list of television shows set in the Seattle area:

== 0-9 ==
- The 4400 (2004–2007)

== A ==
- Almost Live! (1984-1999) (Aired on Comedy Central 1992-1993)
- Aqua Unit Patrol Squad 1 (series run: 2000–present; years set in Seattle: 2011–present)
- Animal Control (2023)

== B ==
- Becky and Bender

== C ==
- Crowded (2016)
- Colony (2016)

== D ==
- Dark Angel (2000–2002, set in an apocalyptic future Seattle after an electromagnetic pulse)
- Davis Rules (1991-1992) set outside Seattle. (Jonathan Winters, Randy Quaid & Bonnie Hunt)
- Dead Like Me (2003–2004, almost none of the show was filmed in Seattle or showed recognizable locations)
- The Diary of Ellen Rimbauer (2003 miniseries)
- Dirk Gently's Holistic Detective Agency (2016 TV series)
- Domestic Life (1984 Sitcom)
- Dumb & Dumber (A 1995 episode of the short-lived animated series entitled "Senseless in Seattle" took place in the city, most notably in the Space Needle)

== E ==
- Every Year After (2026)

== F ==
- Frasier (1993–2004) – Set in contemporary Seattle; at least one episode shot on location in Seattle.

== G ==
- Grey's Anatomy (2005–present)

== H ==
- Here Come the Brides (1968–1970, set in Seattle in the early years of settlement)

== I ==
- iCarly (2007–2012)
- iCarly (2021–2023)
- Imposters (2017–2018)
- Intruders (2014)
- iZombie (2015–2019)
- The Immaculate Conception of Little Dizzle

== J ==
- John Doe (2002)

== K ==
- The Killing (2011)
- Kyle XY (2006–2009)

== L ==
- Life As We Know It (2004)
- Loudermilk (2017–2020)
- The Last of Us (2023–present)
- Laid (2024)

== M ==
- Medicine Ball (1995)
- The Midnight Club (2022)
- Millennium (1996–1999)
- Mr. & Mrs. Smith (1996)

== N ==
- Night Stalker (TV series) (2005)
- The Night Strangler (1973, TV movie)
- No Tomorrow (2016)

== O ==
- Once Upon a Time (2017)
- Once Upon a Time (season 7) (2017)

== P ==
- Postcards from Buster (2004-05)

== R ==
- Reaper (2007–2009)
- Rose Red (2002 miniseries)

== S ==
- Second Chance (2016 TV series) (2016)
- Shooter (2016-2018)
- Six Feet Under (2001–2005), episode "Driving Mr Mossback"
- Station 19 (2018-present)

== T ==
- Almost Home (1993)
- Traffic (2004 miniseries)
- Travelers (2016-2019)
- True Justice (2011-2012)

== U ==
- Under One Roof (1995)

== V ==
- Van Helsing (2016)

== W ==
- Weeds (TV series)

== Y ==
- A Year in the Life (1986–87)
- Your Family or Mine (2015)

== Miniseries, specials or individual episodes ==
- Phineas and Ferb
  - "Phineas and Ferb Summer Belongs to You!"
  - "Phineas And Ferb: The Chronicles Of Meap: Meapless In Seattle"
- Scooby-Doo and Guess Who?
  - "The 7th Inning Scare!"
- La Brea
  - "Topanga"
