= Tsidii Le Loka =

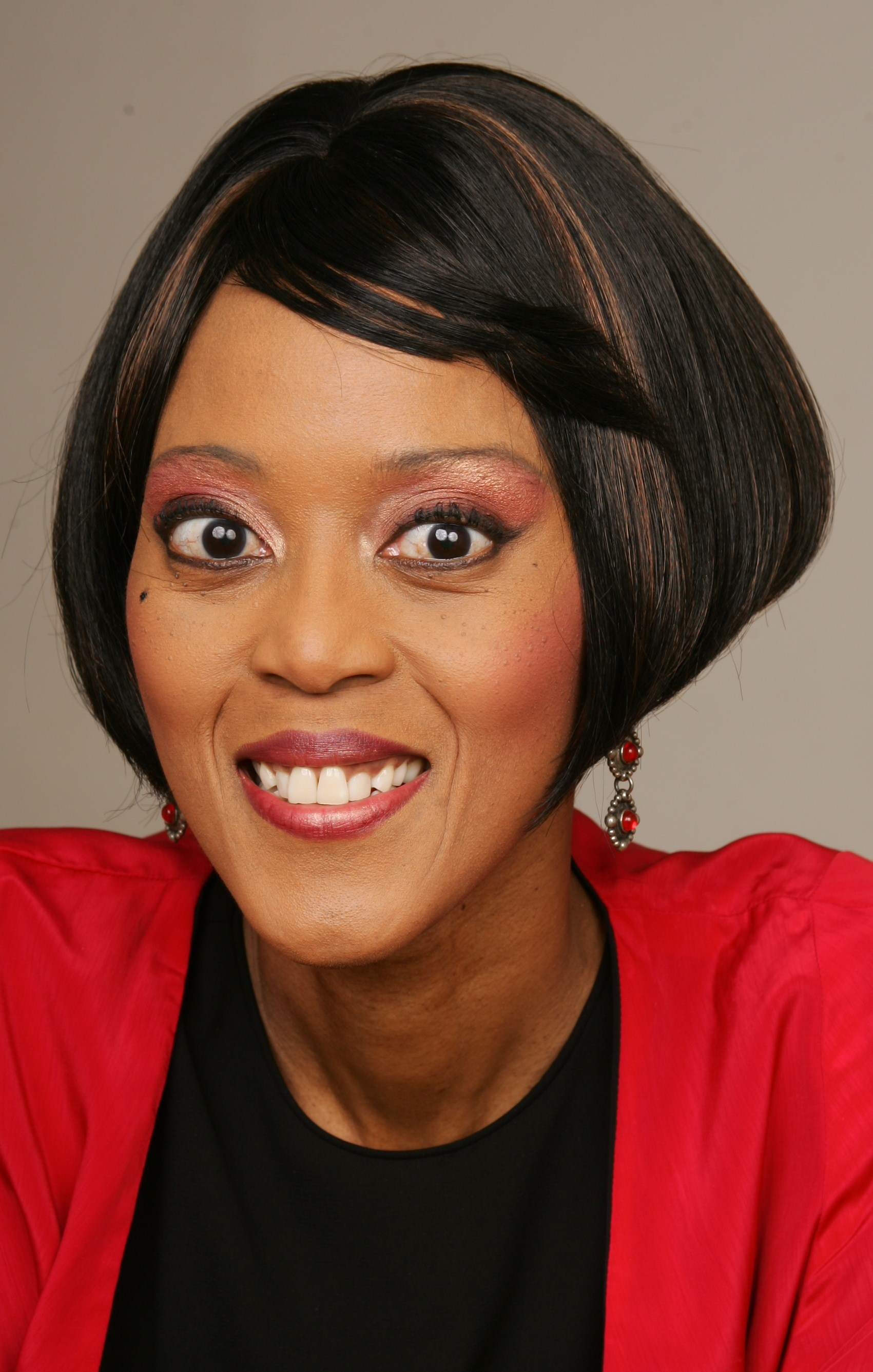
- Le Loka in 2011

Background information
- Born: Tsidii Le Loka; April 3, 1968 (age 58)
- Origin: South Africa (Lesotho)
- Occupations: Consultant, actress, singer, composer
- Instrument: Vocals
- Years active: ca. 1993 - 2003
- Label: Birdwalk International

Tsidii Le Loka-Lupindo (born April 3, 1968) is a Lesotho-American actress, vocalist and composer from South Africa and The Kingdom of Lesotho. She is best known for originating the role of Rafiki in the original Broadway production of Disney's stage musical, The Lion King.

== Early life and education ==
Le Loka was born Tsidii Le Loka-Lupindo on April 3, 1968 in Lesotho to a professor of health education and a professor of history and literature. Her mother is from Transkei, while her father is from Lesotho; at least one side of her family descends from the Zulu. She was the third of four children, and attended one of the first private schools in Lesotho to racially integrate in the early seventies. At 16, Le Loka moved to Johannesburg, South Africa to audition for a singing group. Le Loka performed with the group South of Sahara, where she was mentored by Anneline Malebo, a former member of Joy. Along with Malebo and Faith Shadi Kekana, Le Loka formed a new group, Shadiii, and released a maxi single titled, "Yes I'm Gonna Give It Up" in 1985, produced by Sizwe Zako. Le Loka also gained some experience as a cabaret artist in Johannesburg before moving to the United States in 1991.

Le Loka began studying Economics and Music at the University of Massachusetts Amherst in 1991 before leaving, one credit short of a degree, in July 1996 to take the role of Rafiki in the original Broadway musical The Lion King. As a student, she performed for Desmond Tutu, toured briefly with Harry Belafonte, and recorded music with faculty members and jazz musicians Max Roach and Yusef Lateff. She later completed her degree at UMass, graduating magna cum laude. She also took extra credit courses at Berklee College of Music, and later earned a diploma in Speech and Drama from Trinity College of Music in London.

Le Loka speaks English, Sesotho, Swahili, Zulu, and Xhosa.

== Theatre ==
In 1996, Le Loka was cast as Rafiki in the first Broadway cast of The Lion King after auditioning with "Congo", an adaptation of a Tanzanian folk song originally sung by Miriam Makeba. She moved to Minnesota to rehearse for the musical, then to New York City when the show opened in 1997, produced by Disney and directed by Julie Taymor. For her performance, Tsidii received the Drama Desk Award, Drama League Award and Outer Critics Circle Award for Outstanding Featured Actress in a Musical, and garnered a Tony Award nomination. Le Loka also wrote and composed an original piece for the musical, "Rafiki Mourns", the only cast member to do so. In 1998, Le Loka left the cast, and was replaced in the role by South African singer Thuli Dumakude.

In 1999, Le Loka played Bloody Mary in South Pacific at the Dallas Theater Center. She was nominated for a Leon Rabin Award for Best Actress in a Musical for her role.

Le Loka collaborated and performed as a guest star in the 2000 production of "Riverdance" on Broadway, in which she shared the stage with Irish star Brian Kennedy.

On May 25, 2000, she was awarded the Ivor Novello Award for International Achievement in Musical Theatre from the British Academy of Composers and Songwriters, the first woman of Southern African origin to receive this award.

== Other work ==
Le Loka's film and TV credits include roles in two made-for-television movies, Stephen King's Rose Red and The Diary of Ellen Rimbauer, as well as Law & Order. Her television special "Caught In The Act" on WGBY won an Iris Award for best local program. The television special Tsidii Le Loka In Concert aired on TBS. She was invited to perform at Nelson Mandela's first International Press Conference in Johannesburg after his release from prison.

She has also performed in "Canciones Antes una Guerra / Songs Before the War" with Maria Pagés' flamenco company.

In 2004, Le Loka released an album titled "Here's to the Night".

In 2018, New York City mayor Bill de Blasio proclaimed September 26th as Tsidii Le Loka day in honor of her work as an artist and humanitarian.

== Albums ==
- Here's To The Night, original CD (featuring Tsidii)
- The Lion King On Broadway, original cast (featuring Tsidii, Heather Headley, Jason Raize, Sam Wright and company)
- Yusef Lateef, Heart Vision (featuring Tsidii and Neenna Freelon)
- Bob Beldon, When Doves Cry (featuring Tsidii, Casandra Wilson, Fareed Haque and others)
- Riverdance On Broadway (featuring Tsidii, Brian Kennedy and Riverdance company)
- Tsidii Le Loka, Here's To The Night (featuring Tsidii)
- Shadiii, Livin It Up (featuring Tsidii, Anneline Malebo, Faith Kekana)
- Shadiii, Last Chance (featuring Tsidii, Anneline Malebo, Faith Kekana)

== Awards and nominations ==
In 2018, New York City mayor Bill de Blasio proclaimed September 26th as Tsidii Le Loka day.

Year	Award	Category	Work	Result
1998	Drama Desk Award	Outstanding Featured Actress in a Musical	The Lion King	Won
1998	Tony Award	Best Featured Actress in a Musical	The Lion King	Nominated
