= Thornewood =

Historic house in Washington, United States

Coordinates: 47°07′48″N 122°33′05″W

- U.S. National Register of Historic Places
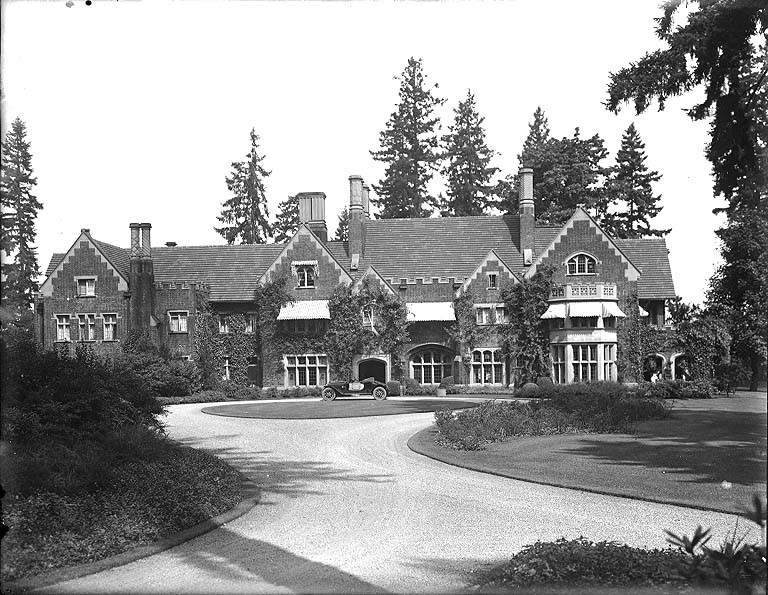
- Thornewood, residence of Chester Thorne, near American Lake, Tacoma, Washington, ca 1915 (BAR 189)

- Location within Washington (state)
- Location: Lakewood, Washington
- Built: 1909–1911
- Architect: Kirtland Kelsey Cutter
- Architectural style: English Gothic
- NRHP reference No.: 82004283
- Added to NRHP: March 18, 1982

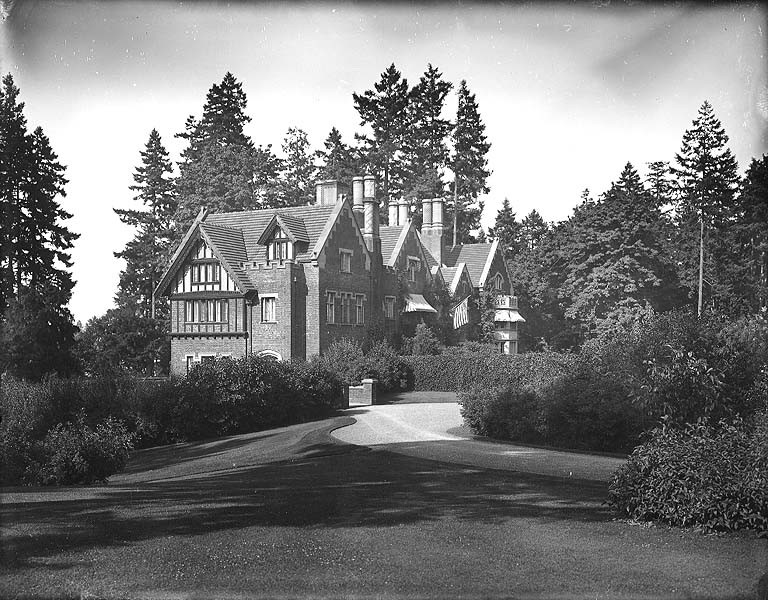
Estate of Chester Thorne, aka Thornewood, ca. 1915.

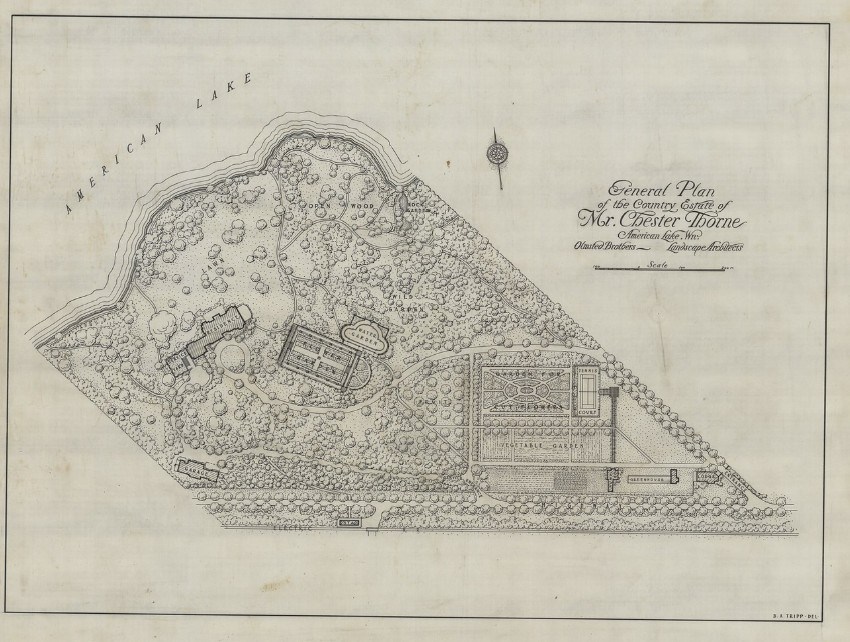
Olmsted Bros. Archives, Job 03494. General Plan for the estate of Chester Thorne.

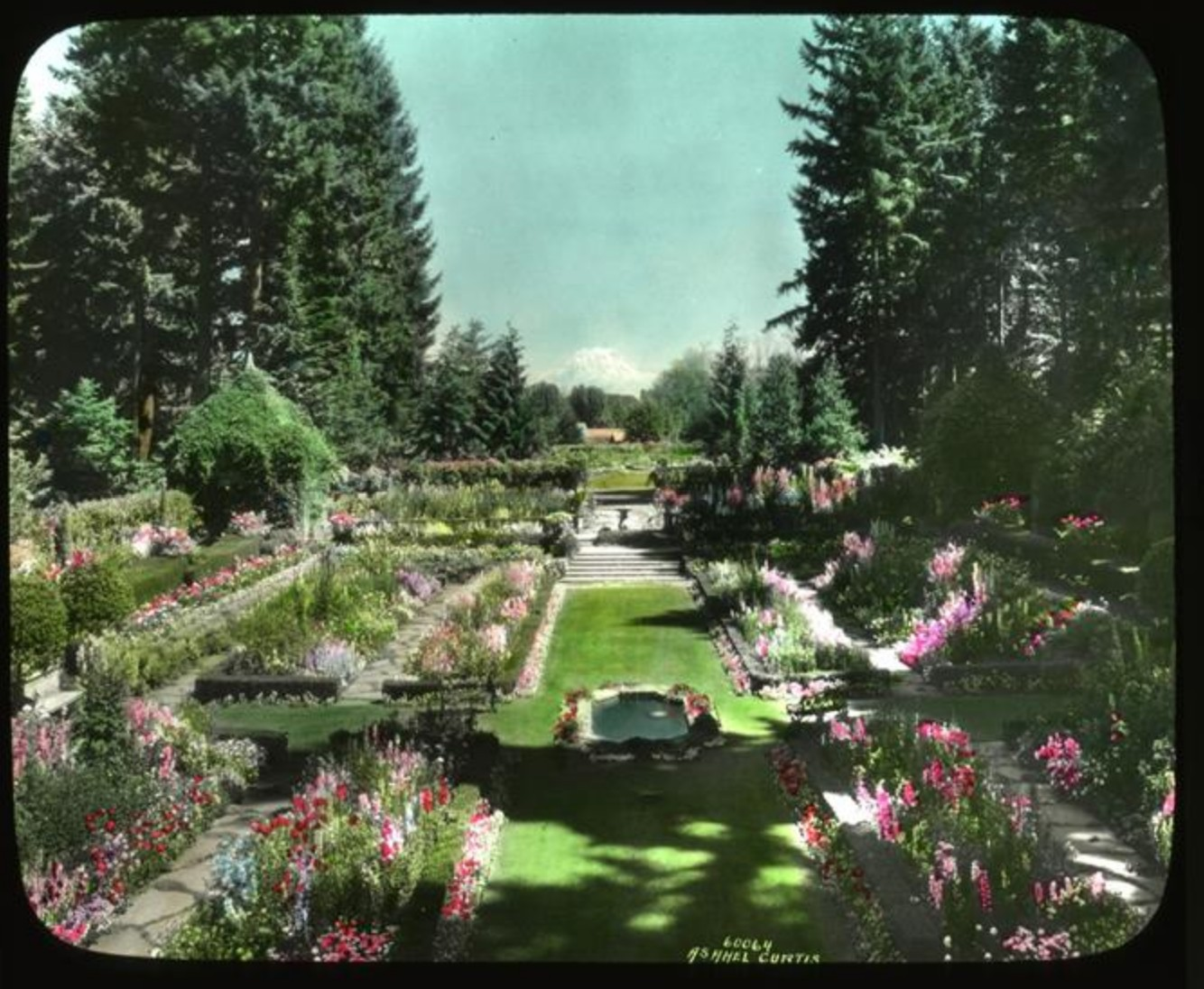
Thornewood's Sunken Garden by Olmsted Brothers, 1933. Handpainted Glass slide by Asahel Curtis.

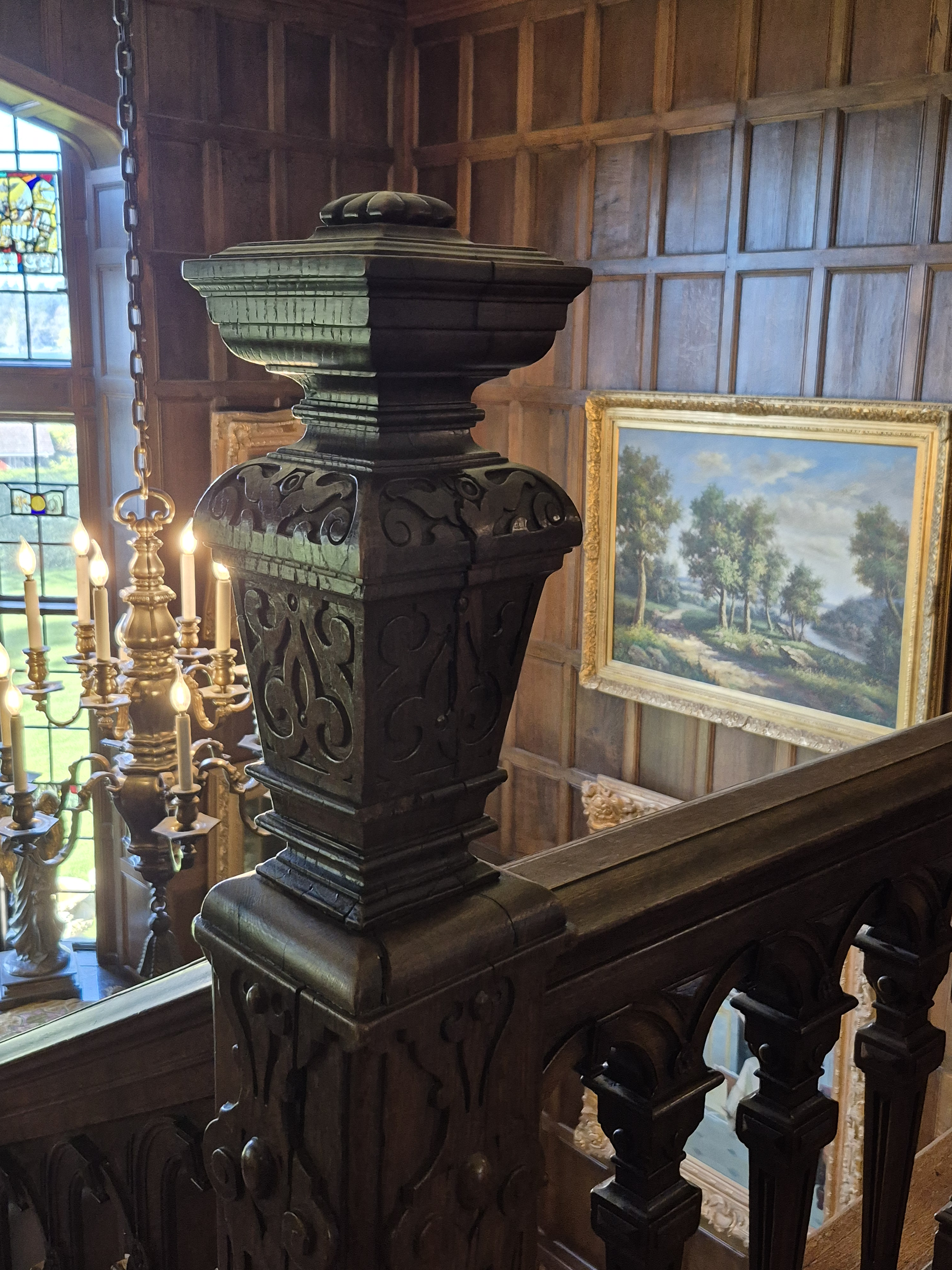
Tudor Oak Stairway, Panels and Newelpost, Thornewood

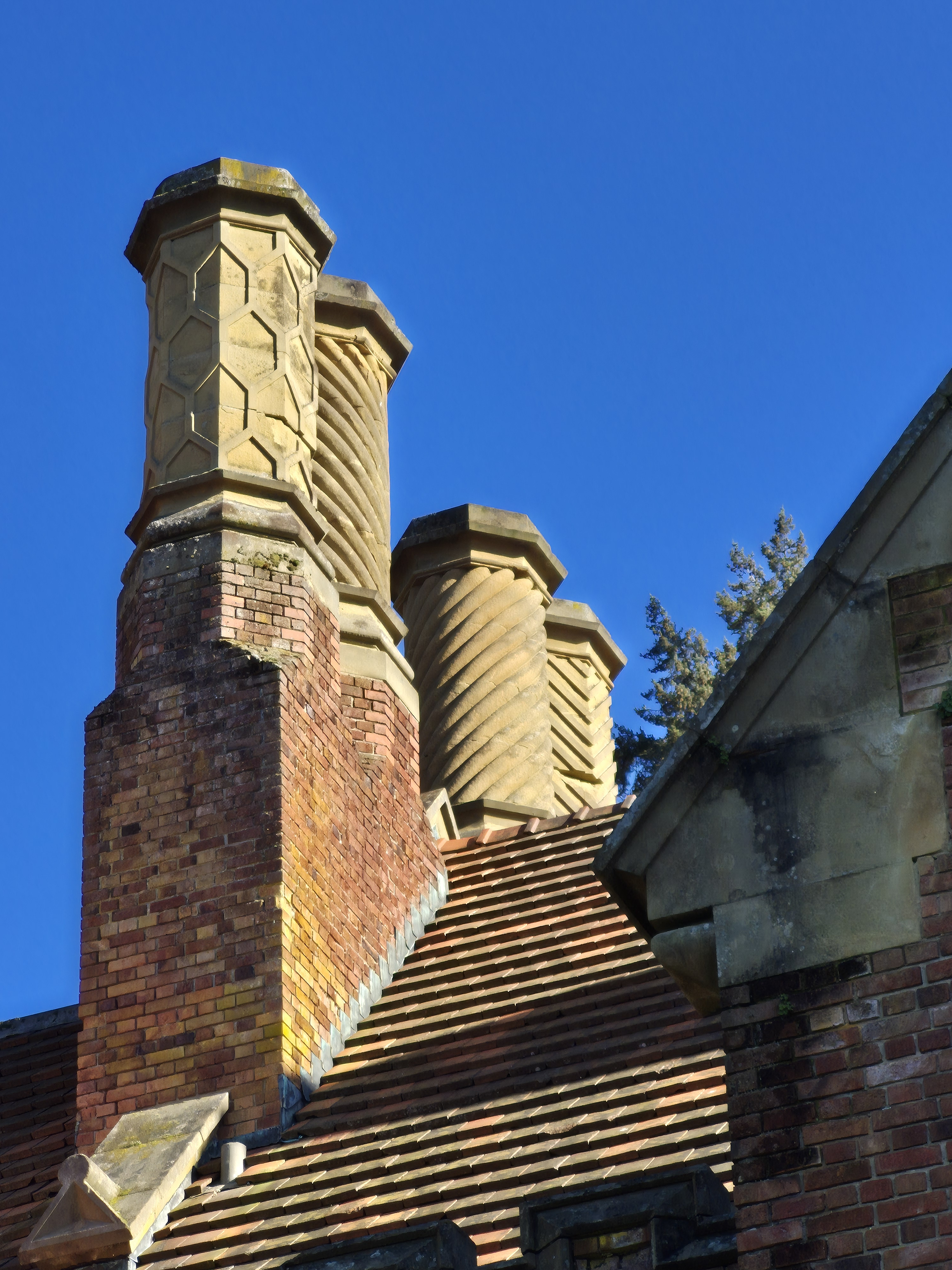
Mismatched Tudor Style Chimney Stacks, Thornewood, snapshot

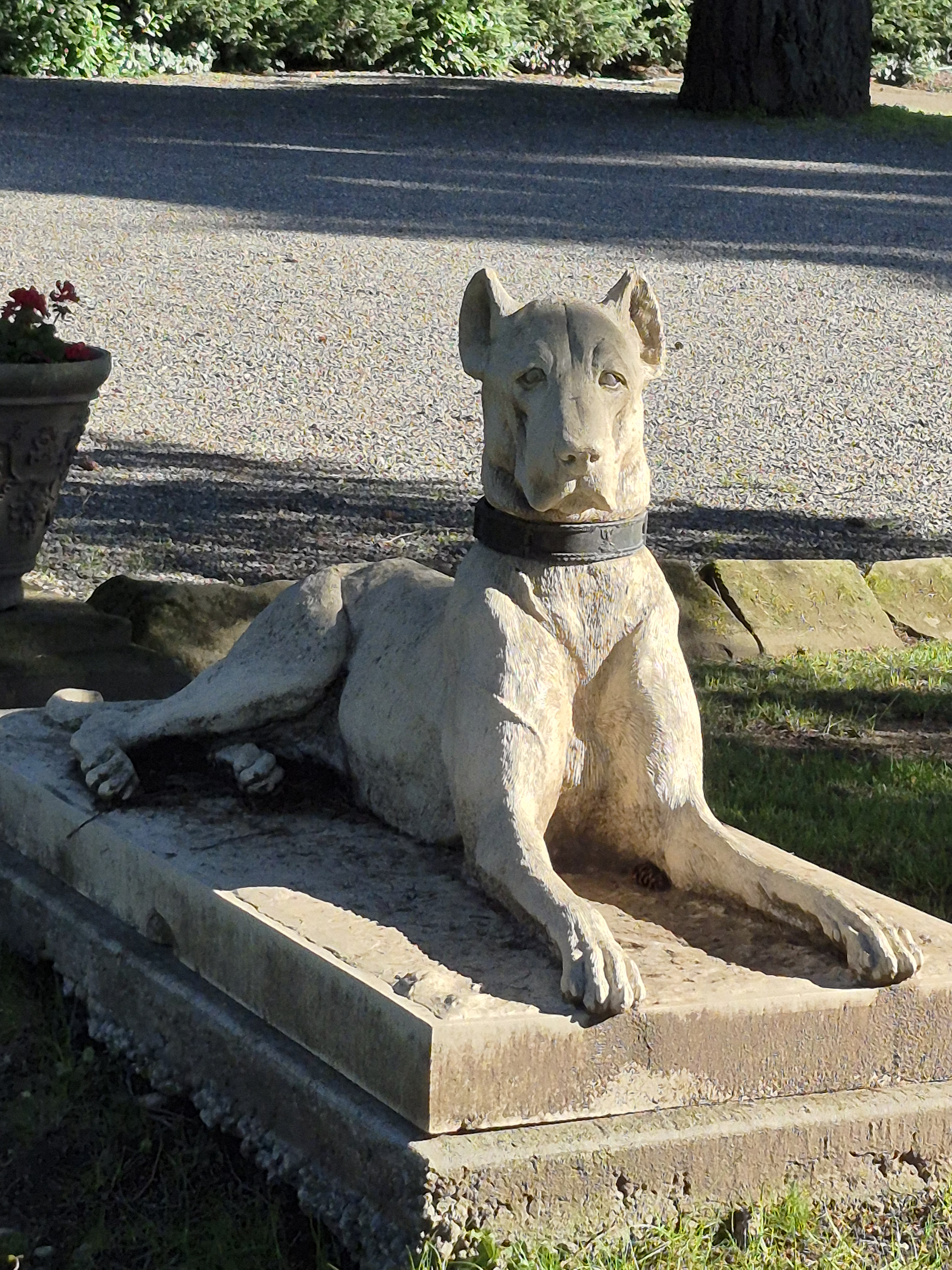
Statue of Dog, Thornewood, snapshot

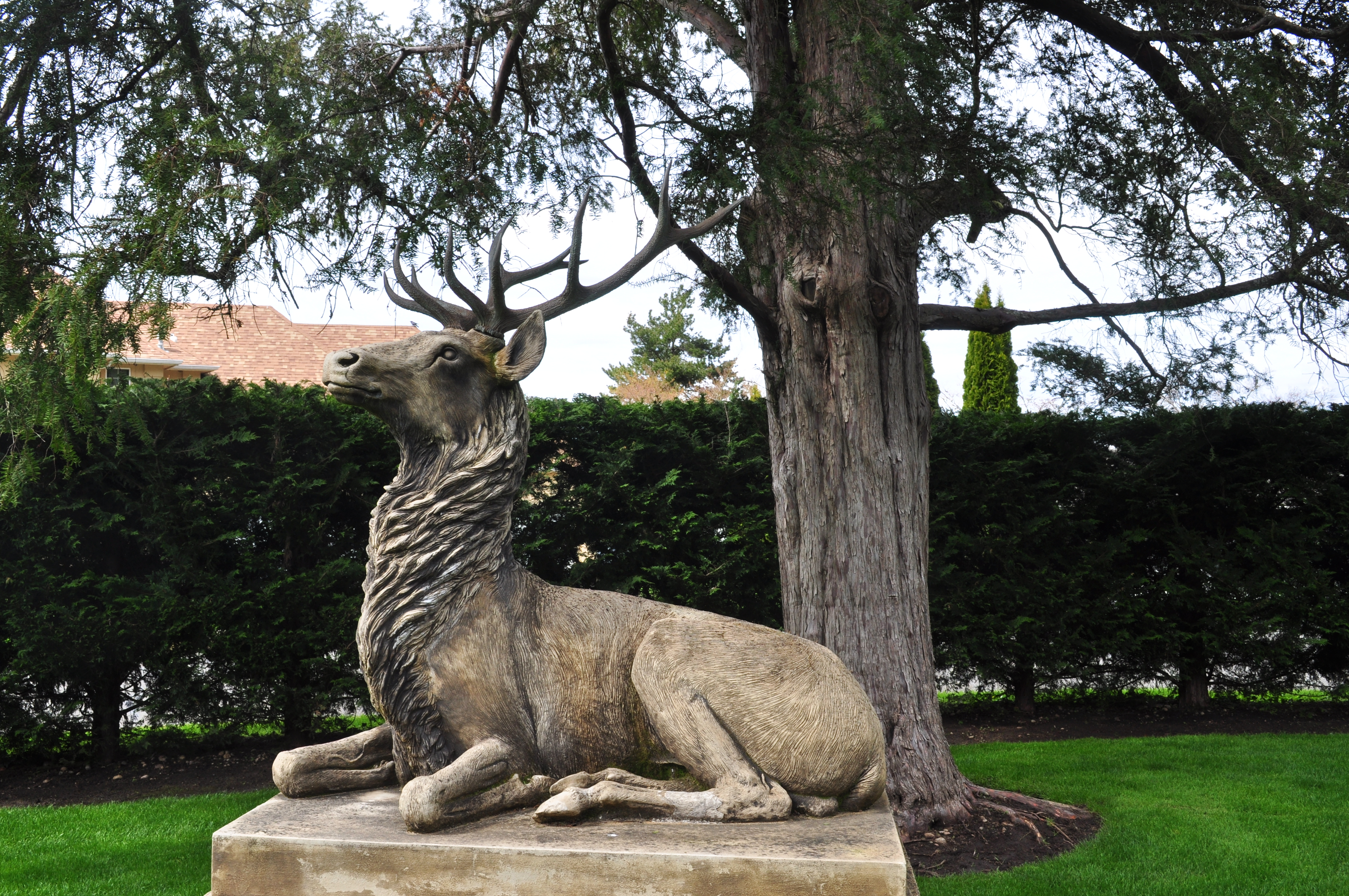
Antique statue of stag, snapshot, Thornewood

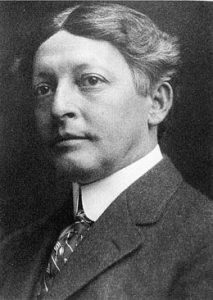
Architect of Thornewood Buildings Kirtland Kelsey Cutter

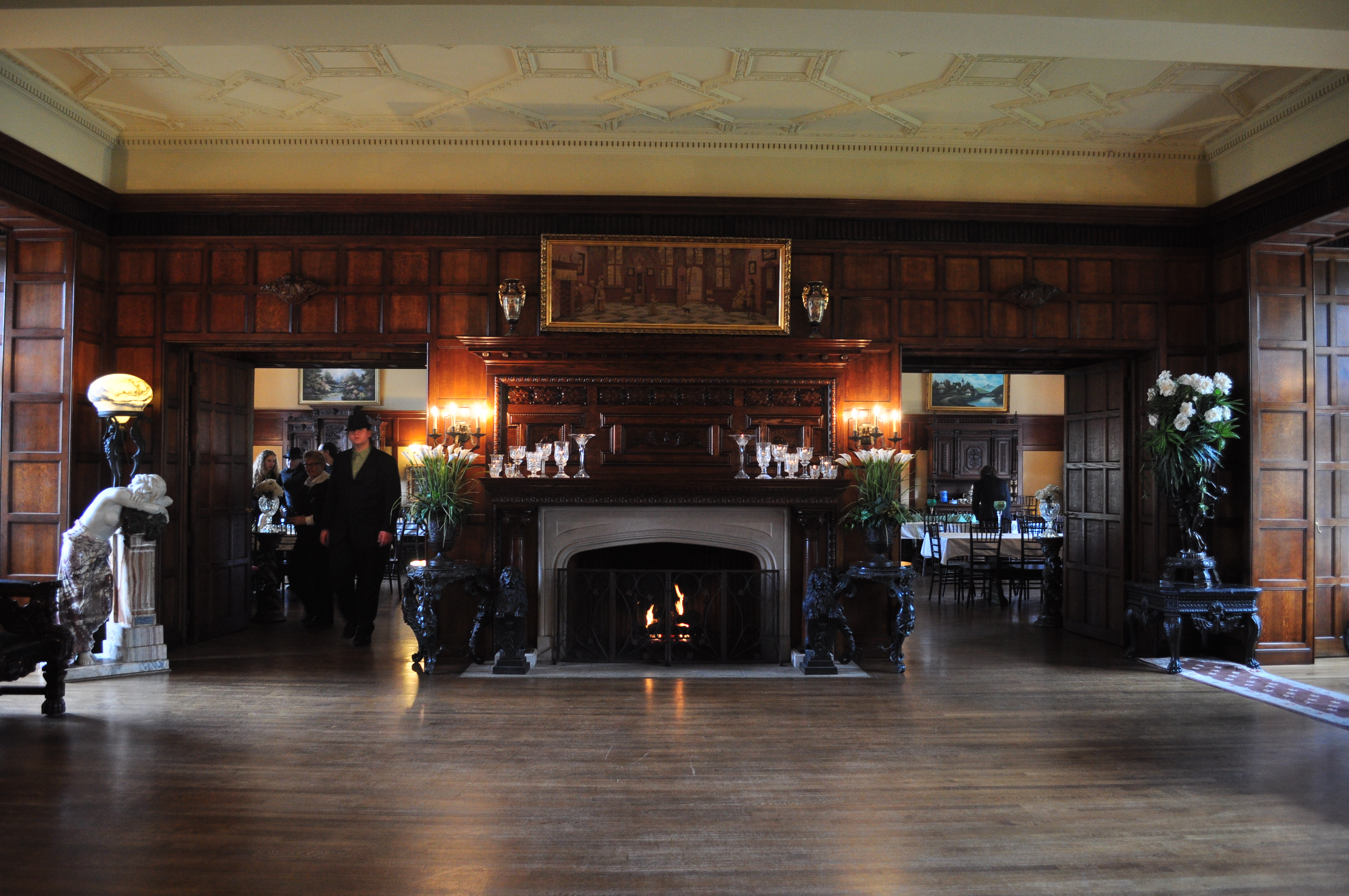
Snapshot of Great Hall, most likely pre-2020, Thornewood. Floor lamp is no longer there.

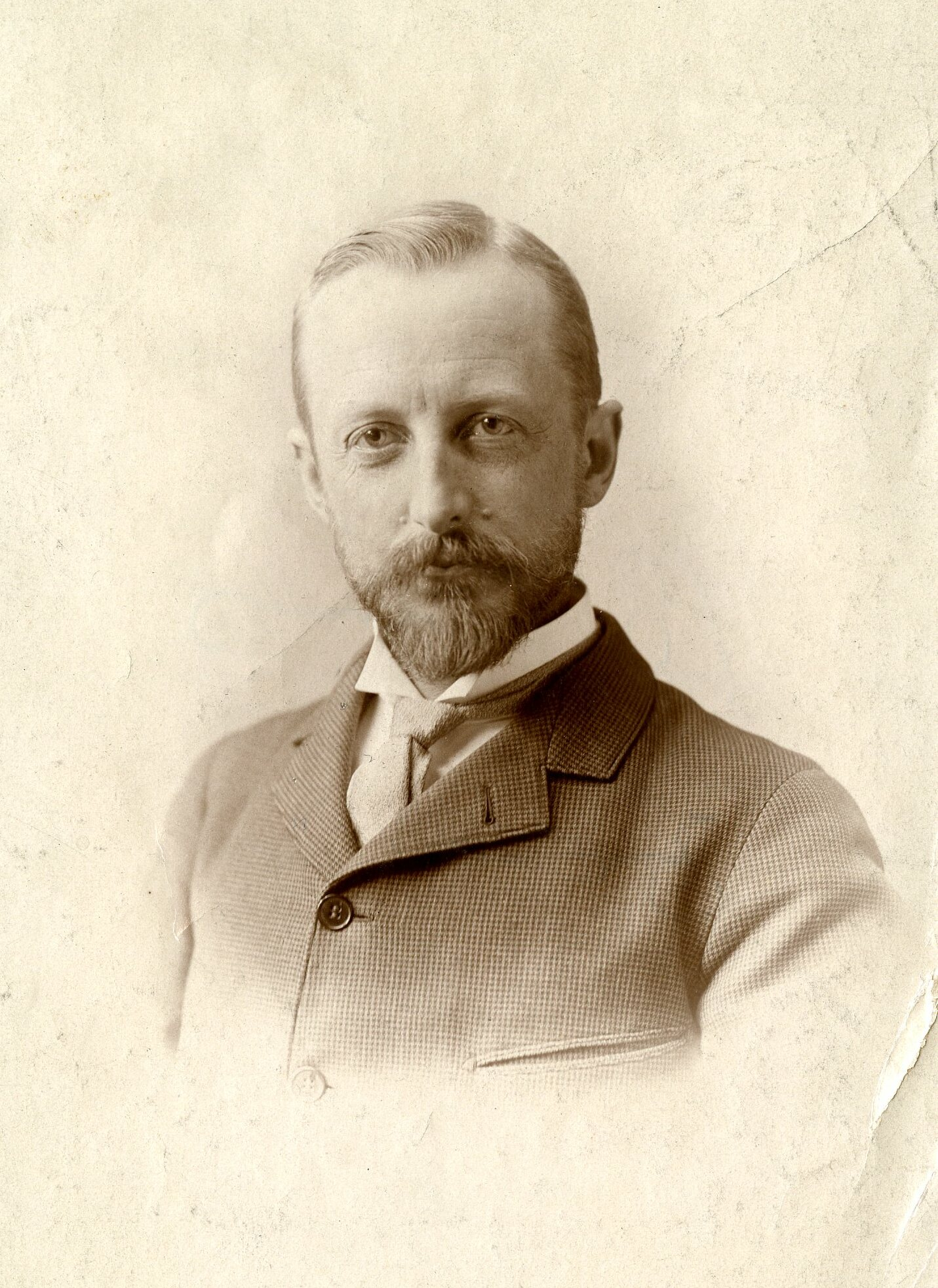
John Charles Olmsted, landscape designer in the Olmsted Bros Firm

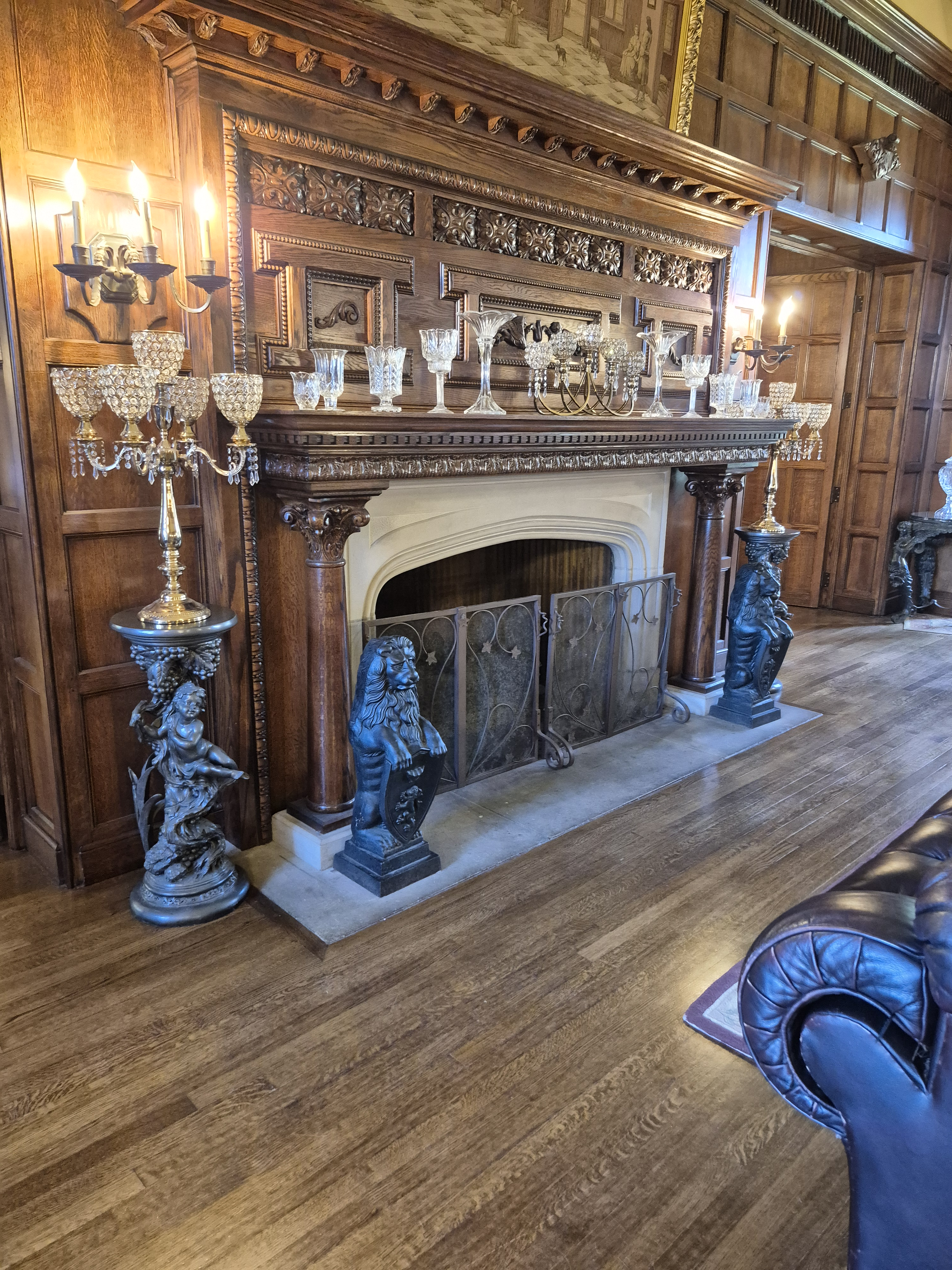
Great Hall's Restored Fireplace, Mantle and surround plus refinished walls that had been painted over pre-restoration, snapshot, Thornewood, 2026.

Thornewood is an English Gothic estate in what is now Lakewood, Washington. It consists of three buildings, including Thornewood Castle. Each building is privately owned by different parties and include the great hall or "castle", the former garage or carriage house, and the former lodge house. The central building is now called Thornewood Castle or Thornewood Castle Hotel. Central facets of the castle are its main staircase, oak paneling, and oak front doors from an unnamed 15th century manor in Britain which was dismantled in 1907-1910, as well as an integrated pan-European stained glass fragment collection (its many pieces dating as far back as the 13th Century) in various windows throughout the building. The rear side of the castle abuts American Lake and hosts a 0.5-acre (2,000 m^{2}) sunken classical garden, the remainder of a set of gardens designed by the famed Olmsted Brothers for the original owners, Chester and Anna Thorne. The castle or hall and its outlying buildings, completed in 1911, were designed by Kirtland Cutter, who went on to design the Lake McDonald Lodge in Glacier National Park.

== History ==
Chester Thorne, a successful financier and one of the founders of the Port of Tacoma, began the process of building his estate in Lakewood, Washington when he purchased an Elizabethan manor in England in 1907, intending to disassemble the house and ship its material to the West Coast of the United States. Thornewood was assembled over the span of three years, beginning in 1908 and finishing in 1911. In addition to the main stairwell and oak doors, the mansion offers up a collection, integrated into many of the house's minor and major windows, of stained glass fragments and pieces, many as old as the 13th century, collected as a passion project by a European aristocrat. The signature red brick was made new in Wales and imported along with the vintage contents via three ships, traveling across the Atlantic, around the horn of South America and Northwards to the Port of Tacoma in Washington State.

The mansion was built according to modern demands with complete electric lighting, modern plumbing, concrete and rebar foundations and floors and approximately 22 bathrooms. It features more modern concepts of the early 20th century such as a loggia alongside the house. Various sources estimate its size to be between 25,000 square feet (2,300 m^{2}) and 31,000 square feet (2,900 m^{2}). An estimated staff of 40 was tasked with running the house and its related needs, and an estimated 28 full-time gardeners were required for the grounds.

Initially, the estate contained an estimated 100 acres (400,000 m^{2}), most of which was sold off and developed for private residences in the 1950's, leaving the mansion on a 4-acre (16,000 m^{2}) plot with a separate plot accessing the lake. Much of the original Olmsted Brothers landscaped areas were lost or dismantled including a water or pool garden attached to the remaining sunken garden.

There have been a few owners of the mansion and in the past it was a private residence, apartment building, and a bed and breakfast. By 2000 the mansion was down on its heels and had been divided into separate rented apartments. Lending the mansion for two TV miniseries, Rose Red and its sequel, The Diary of Ellen Rimbauer, funded restoration of the mansion and sunken garden.

=== The Olmsted Gardens ===
Between 1915 and the 1930's, Thornewood's Olmsted Brothers' Designs and plantings were continually recognized as exceptional by national authorities, societies and publications. The combination of natural forested surroundings and plants of the Pacific Northwest, the shore of American Lake and the view of Mount Rainier centered between the trees beyond the sunken formal garden were novel and yet classical with the English classical garden layout of the sunken garden also utilizing garden designer Gertrude Jekyll's schemes for Color Gardens. In 1915, photos of the gardens were featured in Beautiful Gardens of America and American Country Houses of Today. In 1926, they were featured as one of America's Five Most Beautiful Gardens. In 1930, the gardens were awarded Most Beautiful Garden in America by the Garden Club of America. Despite such a reputation and additional features, much of the Olmsted Brothers designed garden "rooms", a vegetable and cutting garden, a non-sunken classical garden and various structures were demolished or broken up when much of the estate was sold to a developer in 1959. What remained was on the remaining property surrounding the mansion which included the sunken garden, various trees, lawns, plants and hardscaping. The pond or pond lily garden with its walled fountain and Asian or Japanese influences, which was attached to the sunken garden has since been demolished or covered over. Over the course of time, however, future owners procured new plants and features, as well as a large collection of statues and urns that were not part of the original gardens. Larger antique statues of guard dogs, boar and an antlered buck as well as more classic Grecian style urns and figures were collected from across Europe to be placed within the castle's gardens and grounds.

=== Famous Guests ===
President Theodore Roosevelt is said to have visited the mansion for 2 weeks, while President William Howard Taft is noted as having visited the mansion for 3 days; both had also traveled at various times in Chester Thorne's yacht, the El Primero. Taking into account the completion date of the residence in 1911, their visits would have taken place in 1911 and beyond. Both Roosevelt and Taft visited the Tacoma area in 1911 in preparation for the 1912 election season, yet those visits were in April (Roosevelt) and October (Taft) and were very brief whistlestops rather than prolonged stays. Specific dates of their visits at the estate are uncertain and may have occurred after both lost their bids for presidential office in 1912. During his October visit in 1911, historical sources report that Taft dined and stayed at The Tacoma Hotel in the City of Tacoma. Both men, however, did pay visits to the area after 1911. The Presidential Suite at Thornewood Castle is named in their honor.

=== Film History ===
In 1927, the mansion was used as part of the set for silent film drama, The Eye of the Totem, directed by W.S. Van Dyke and produced by H.C. Weaver Studios of Tacoma. In 2000, the ABC Television Network used the set for the Stephen King miniseries, Stephen King's Rose Red, with Thornewood Castle and its grounds playing the role of the eponymous estate. The miniseries began filming at Thornewood and in Seattle at the University of Washington on August 22, 2000, and was completed in mid-December 2000, with the finished series released in January 2002. The fictional estate of Rose Red was depicted as considerably larger than even the actual Thornewood, which is considered to be around 27,000 square feet (2,500 m^{2}) among all its interior rooms. Centered on the green lawn of the mansion's front drive is a white circular fountain adorned with various putti figures which was made for the film and is not original to the home. A faux tower along the roof line was made for the series and was temporary. Thornewood Castle Hotel features a dedicated overnight rental room named The Rose Red Suite which is below where the temporary tower was located.

Several exterior shots of the castle were also used in the popular 2020 Netflix horror series The Haunting of Bly Manor. The exterior of the mansion was a brief establishing shot, in There Will Be Blood (released in 2007 and starring Daniel Day Lewis) for the grand private mansion owned by the protagonist.

The three buildings on Thornewood Estate were listed on the National Register of Historic Places in 1982. The "Thornewood Castle" or mansion is currently a hotel in a private gated community offering two attached modern apartments and 9 historic overnight rooms inside the main building; it also offers a popular indoor and outdoor wedding and event venue, vacation and reunion facility, and opportunity for future filming and photographic enterprises.

=== Key Figures ===
Kirtland Cutter

John Charles Olmsted

Olmsted Brothers

=== Related Subjects ===
Asahel Curtis

Theodore Roosevelt

El Primero

Gertrude Jekyll

William Howard Taft

Garden Club of America

Destruction of country houses in 20th-century Britain

England's Lost Country Houses Lost Heritage Org

== Gallery ==
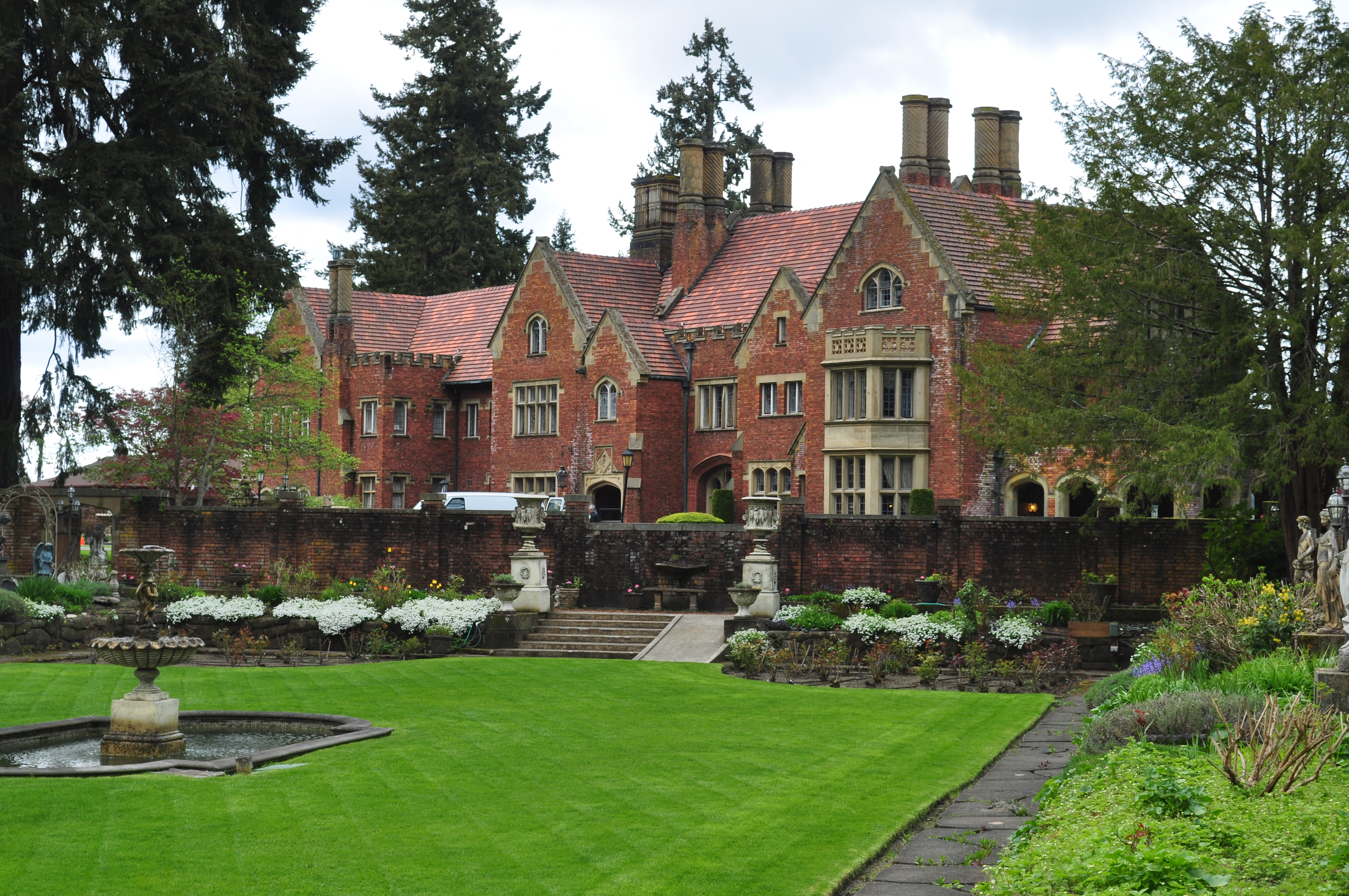
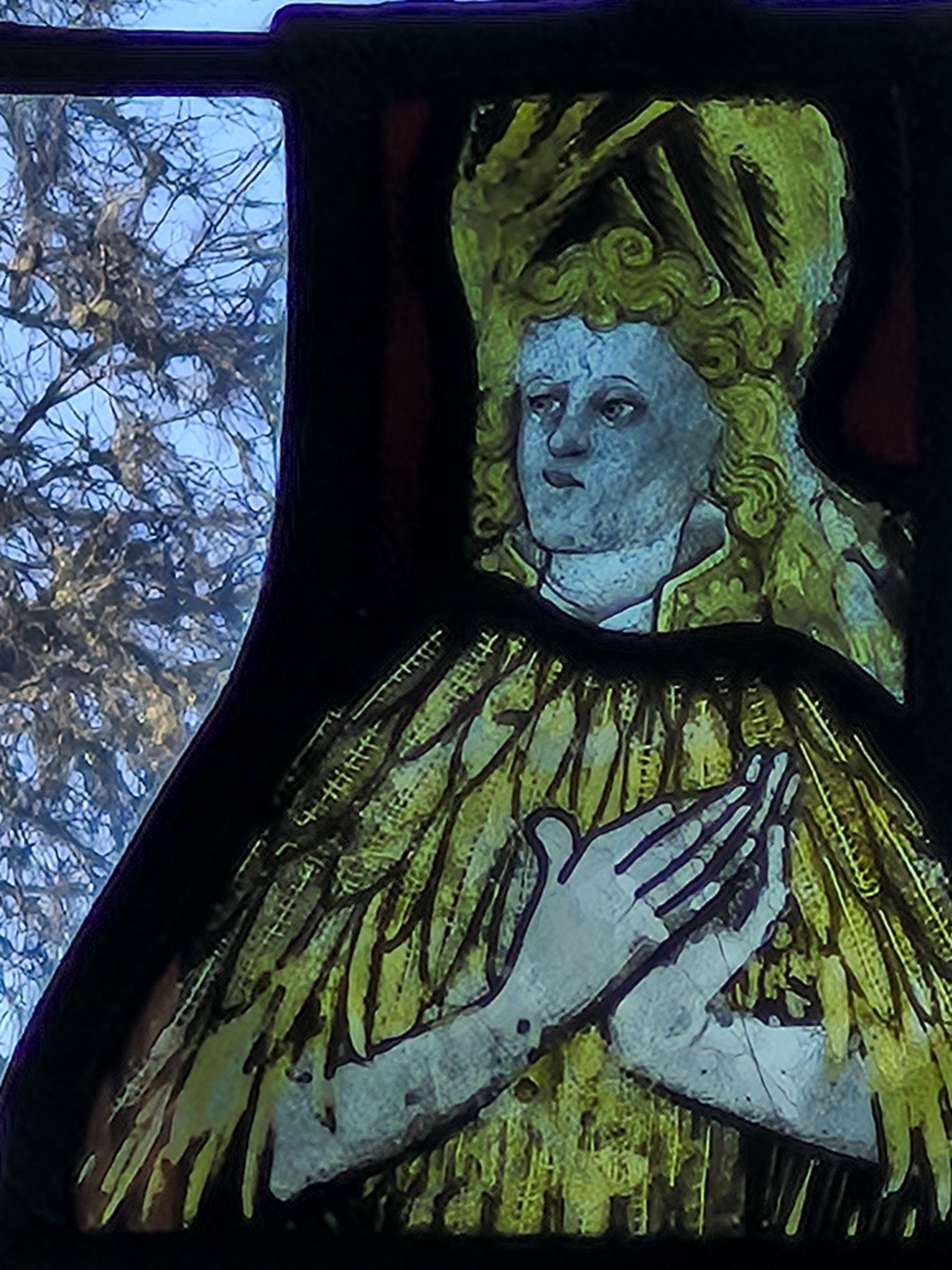
Snapshot of Reclaimed Medieval Period Stained Glass in a window at Thornewood Castle.
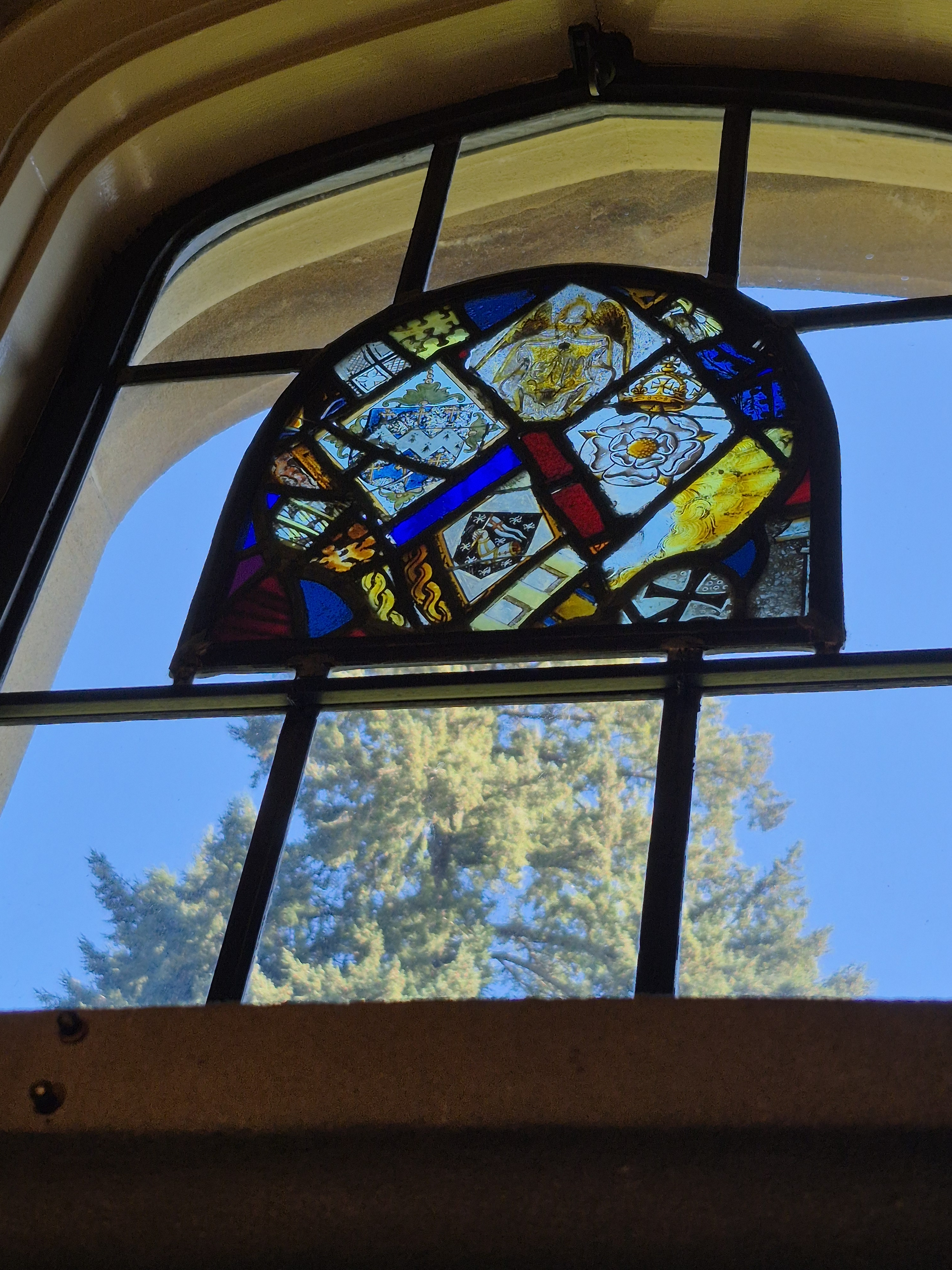
Fragments of Reclaimed Stained Glass from Britain and Europe. Present in this section: a white rose of York (see War of the Roses). Snapshot, Thornewood.
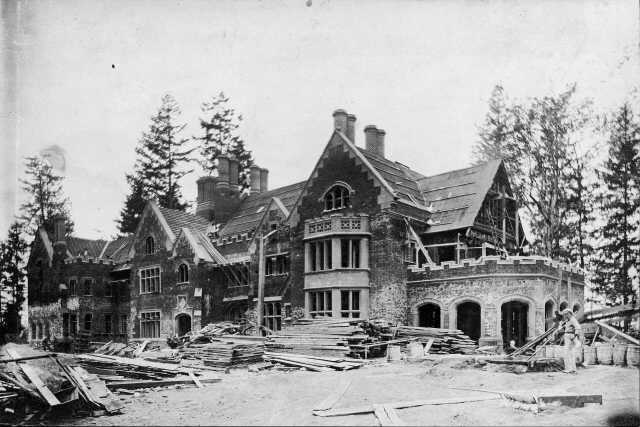
Construction of Thorne Mansion, 1910.
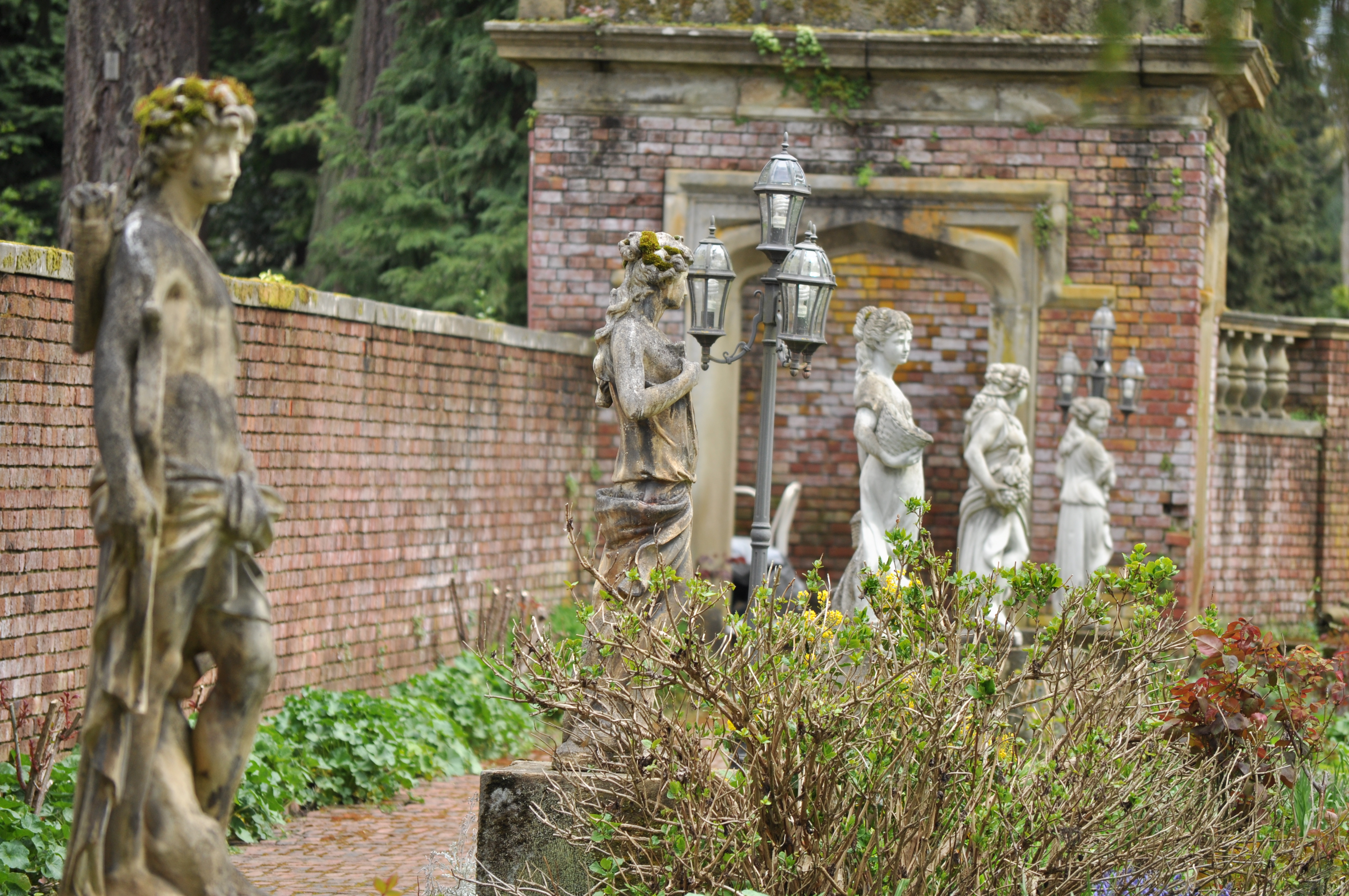
Found statues added to the sunken garden, Thornewood.
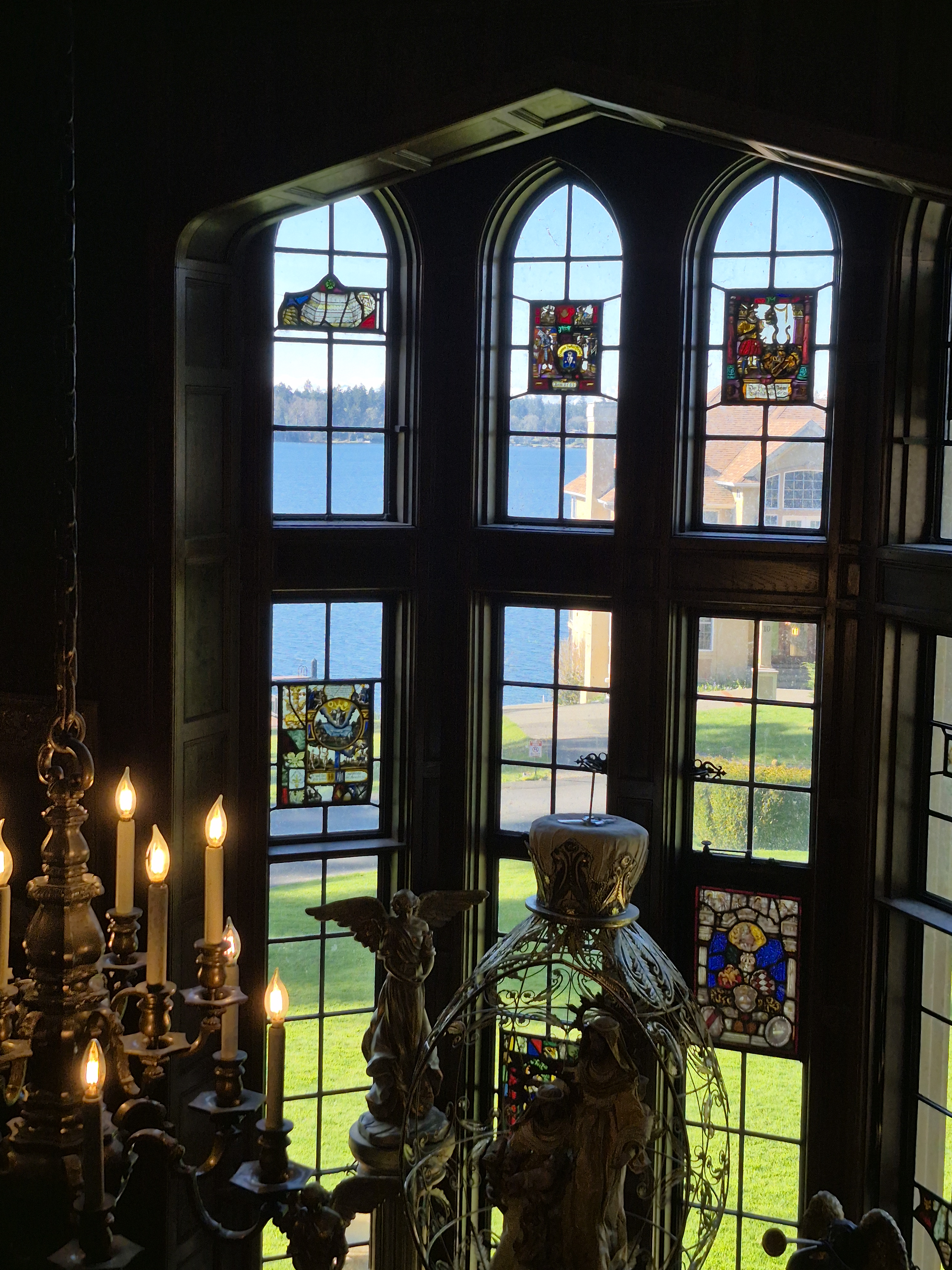
Snapshot: Main staircase windows, Thornewood.
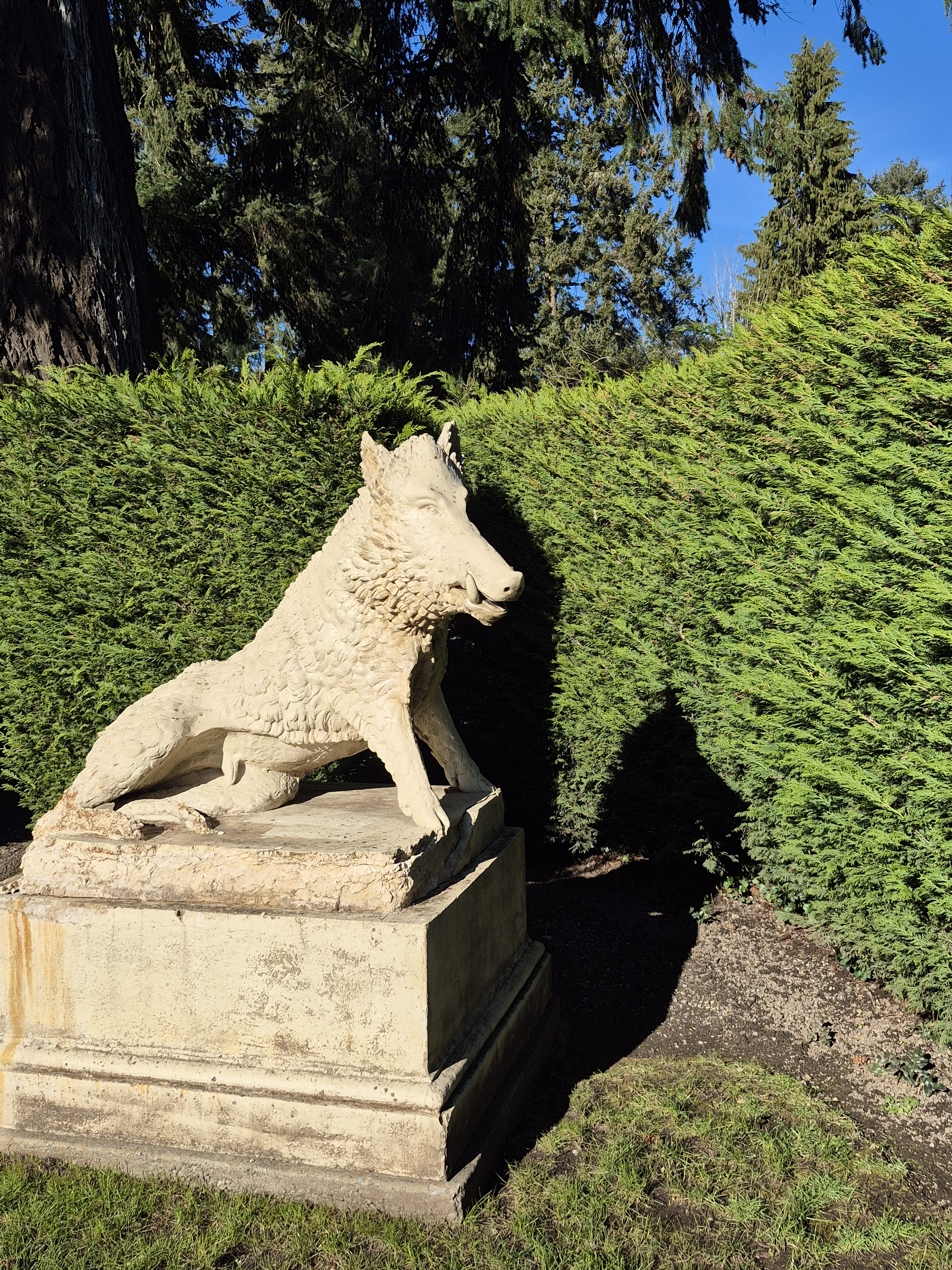
One of the twin boar statues at Thornewood, 2026 snapshot
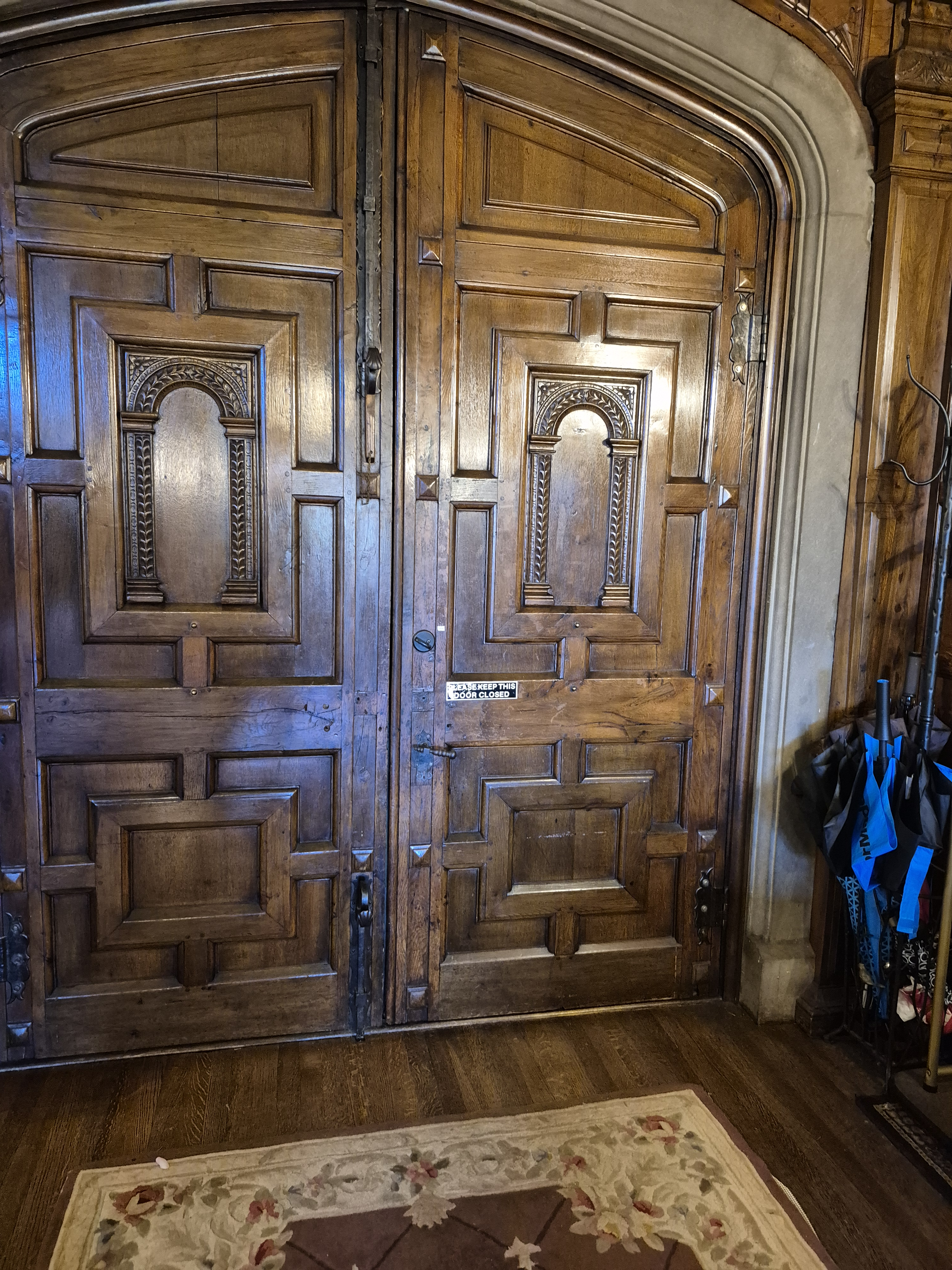
Snapshot: Oak Castle Doors, likely Tudor period, exit from great hall, Thornewood.
Thornewood Castle aka Thornewood aka Chester Thorne Residence, Lakewood, Washington State; front view from the Olmsted Bros. designed Sunken Garden.

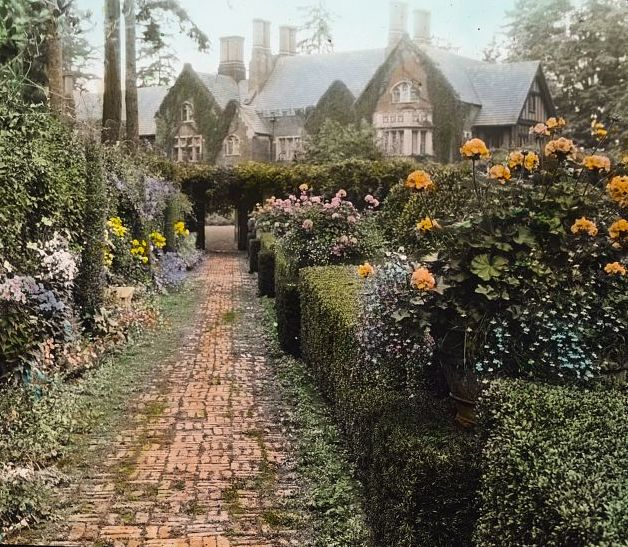
Thornewood Castle aka Chester Thorne Residence from handpainted glass slide.

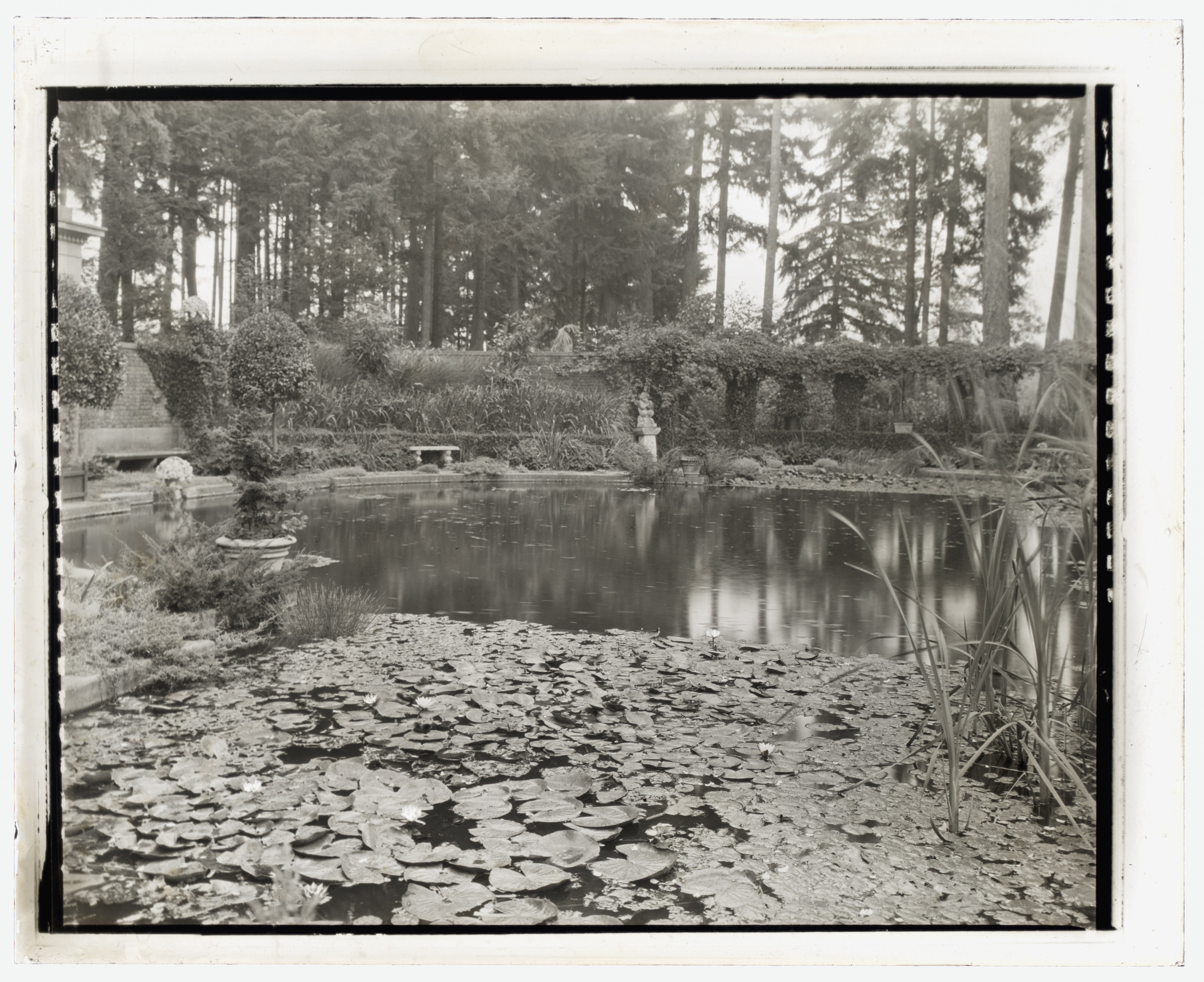
Water Garden at Thornewood which was appended to the sunken garden. Now destroyed.

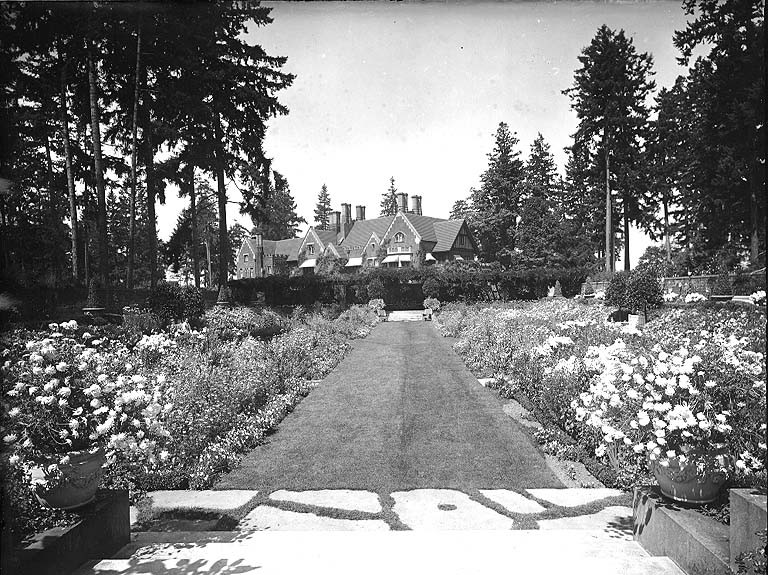
Thornewood Castle as viewed from the sunken garden, ca. 1915

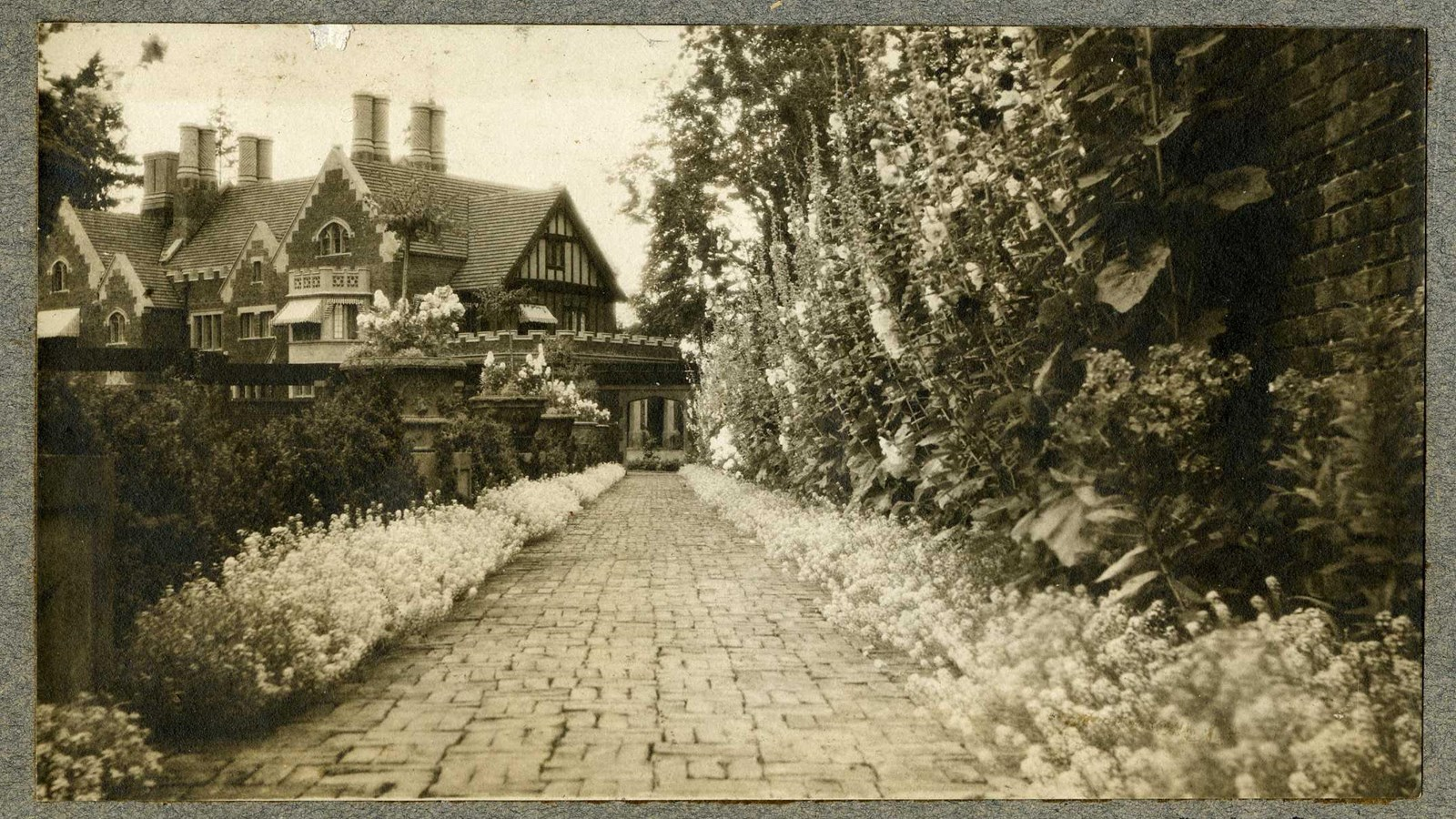
Thornewood Mansion as viewed from a brick pathway in the sunken garden, ca. 1915-1935.

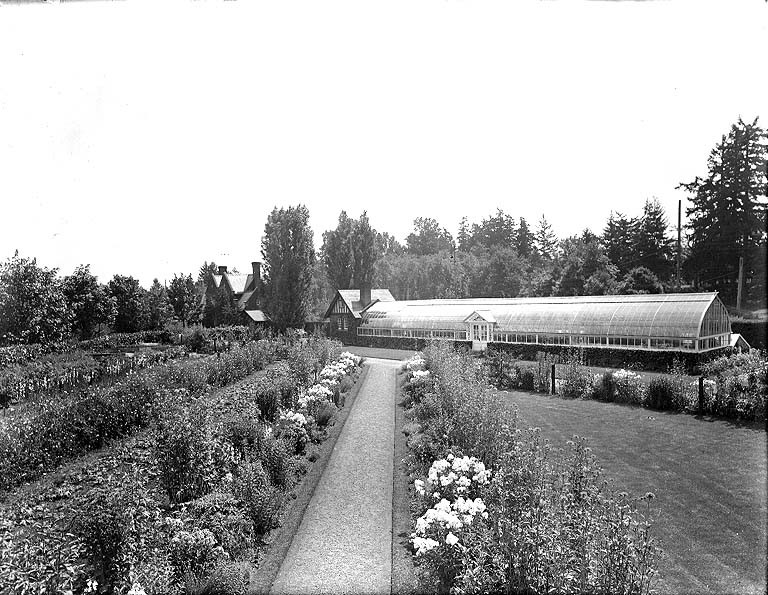
Former greenhouse and extra gardens ca 1915.

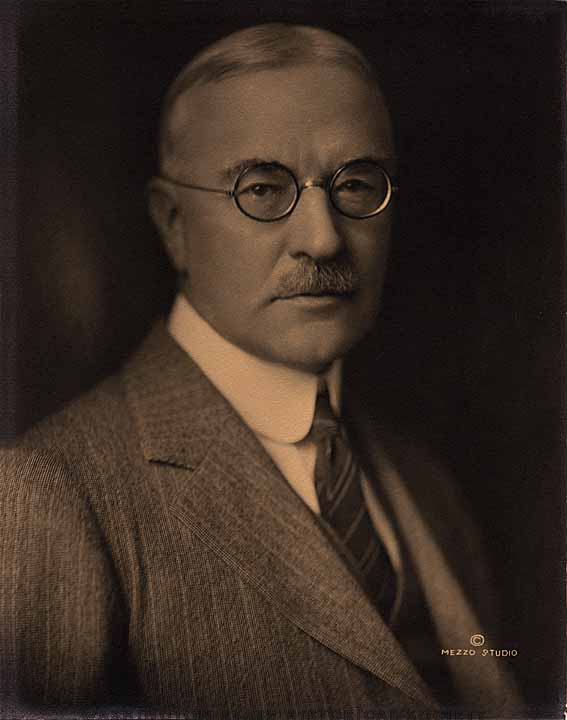
Initial owner of Thornewood Estate, Chester Thorne of Tacoma and Lakewood, Washington. (1863-1927)

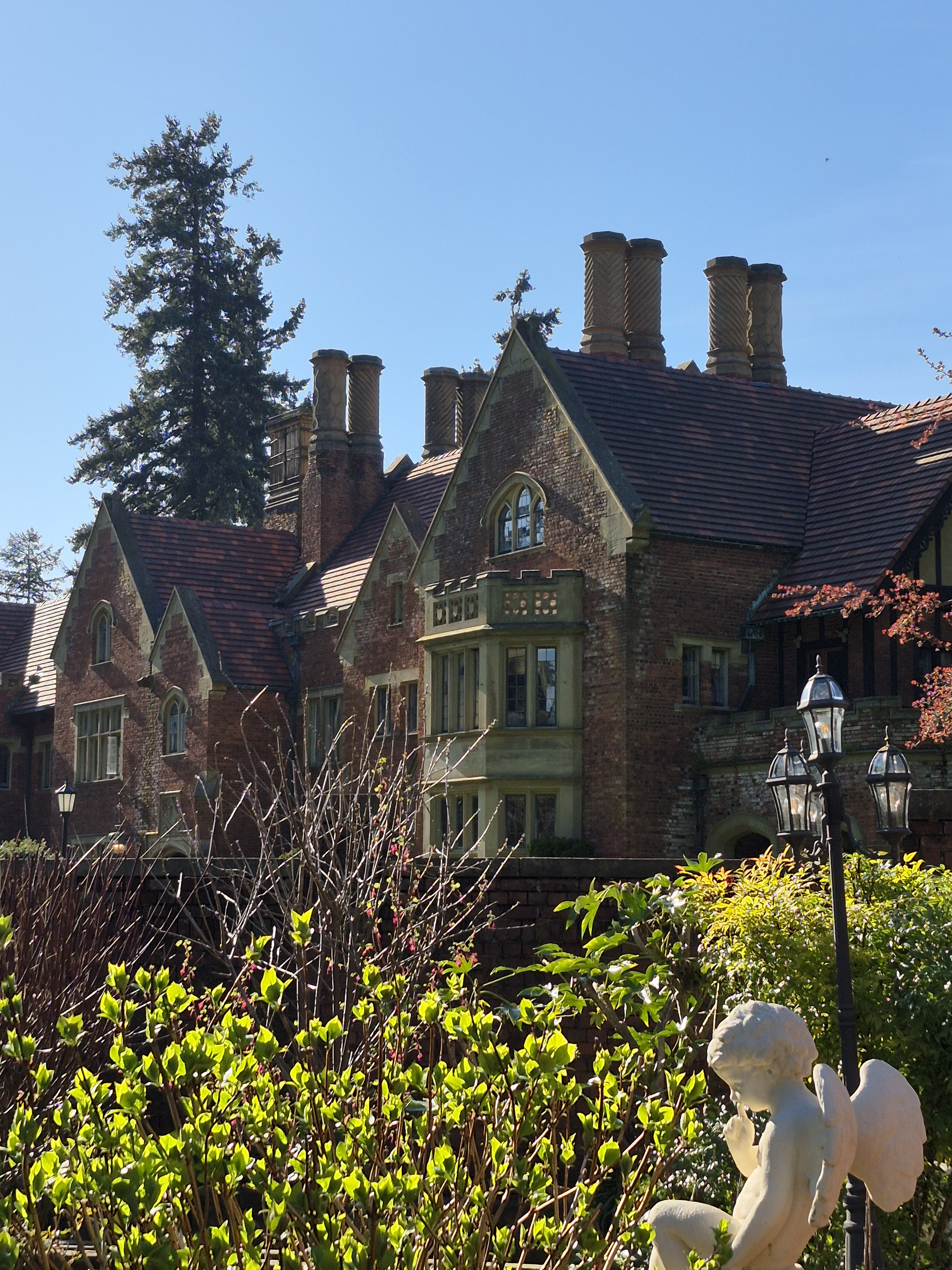
Snapshot: Thornewood from sunken garden, 2026
