= The Diary of Ellen Rimbauer: My Life at Rose Red =

2001 novel by Ridley Pearson

- Hardcover edition
- Author: Ridley Pearson
- Language: English
- Genre: Horror
- Publisher: Hyperion
- Publication date: 2001
- Publication place: United States
- Media type: Print (hardback & paperback)
- Pages: Hardcover: 252; Paperback: 278
- ISBN: 0-7868-6801-5 (hardcover); ISBN 0-7868-9043-6 (paperback)
- OCLC: 48659852

The Diary of Ellen Rimbauer: My Life at Rose Red is a 2001 horror novel by Ridley Pearson focusing on the life of the fictional John and Ellen Rimbauer and the construction of their mansion, Rose Red, in the early 20th century. Built on an old Indian burial ground, Rose Red is considered haunted and mysterious tragedies occur throughout the mansion's history. The novel is written in the form of a diary by Ellen Rimbauer, and annotated by the fictional professor of paranormal activity, Joyce Reardon. The novel also presents a fictional afterword by Ellen Rimbauer's grandson, Steven.

A recurring theme in the book are the many missing people associated with the mansion. Several servants disappear shortly after the mansion's building in 1906, followed by the disappearance of Ellen's 6-year-daughter. In the 1940s, two of Ellen's suspected lesbian lovers disappeared without a trace. Ellen herself disappeared in 1950. A tourist disappears in the early 1970s, while visiting the mansion. The mansion is eventually demolished after the deaths of paranormal investigators who tried to find answers to its mysteries.

== Genesis of the novel ==
The novel's genesis came as part of a $200,000 promotional marketing campaign for Stephen King's Rose Red television miniseries. Marketing of the film presented the movie as based on actual events.

In 2000, two years before the Rose Red miniseries aired, the producers contracted with author Ridley Pearson to write a tie-in novel, to be titled The Diary of Ellen Rimbauer: My Life at Rose Red, under the pseudonym "Dr. Joyce Reardon" (one of the main characters of the miniseries). The novel presented itself as nonfiction, and claimed to be the actual diary of Ellen Rimbauer (wife of the builder of Rose Red). The work was originally intended to be an architectural book featuring photos and drawings of the fictional Rose Red house with the supernatural elements subtly woven into the text and photos, but Pearson (building on several references to a diary in King's script for the miniseries) wrote it as Ellen Rimbauer's diary instead. Inspired by the 1999 film The Blair Witch Project, King came up with the idea of presenting the novel as a real one by having "Dr. Joyce Reardon" edit the "diary." King also inserted a reference into the book's foreword that a "best-selling author had found the journal in Maine", so that fans would be misled into concluding that King had written the work. The ruse worked. Fans and the press speculated for some time that Stephen King or his wife Tabitha King had written the book until Pearson was revealed to be the novel's author.

To help promote the miniseries and further blur the line between reality and fiction, the book contained a link to a fictional "Beaumont University" Web site where "Dr. Joyce Reardon" was alleged to have taught. The site contains in-universe promotional material as well as an easter egg page with diary entries that were "censored" from the main book.

A mockumentary was released by ABC a few weeks prior to the miniseries' release entitled Unlocking Rose Red:The Diary of Ellen Rimbauer. The special utilized actors who only vaguely resembled the ones within the miniseries for Steven Rimbauer and Joyce Reardon to speak about the happenings at Rose Red whilst promoting the upcoming miniseries by Stephen King which was seemingly referred to as a production heavily based on a true story. Excerpts from the novel were read out by an actress for the mockumentary, while a narrator and various interviewees discussed some of the events that had happened within the novel. Footage from the flashback sequences in the miniseries were also used in the mockumentary. Both the diary and the miniseries were teased further when the mockumentary explained how Reardon had edited the diary for release with Hyperion Books, while a brief snippet of an interview with King himself was shown. The mockumentary seemingly pokes fun at its metafictional existence as it ends by acknowledging that Reardon and Steven Rimbauer are only about to conduct their expedition into the house while also stating that the miniseries will focus on what they expect to encounter within (as most of the miniseries focuses on their scientific expedition within the house, even though at the time the "documentary" was made, the expedition hadn't even been conducted yet).

Intended to be a promotional item rather than a stand-alone work, its popularity spawned a 2003 prequel television film to Rose Red, titled The Diary of Ellen Rimbauer. The novel tie-in idea was repeated on Stephen King's next project, the miniseries Kingdom Hospital. Richard Dooling, King's collaborator on Kingdom Hospital and writer of several episodes in the miniseries, published a fictional diary, The Journals of Eleanor Druse, in 2004.

== Plot synopsis ==
The novel relates the building of the Rimbauer house (which is eventually named "Rose Red") in 1906 by John Rimbauer for his new wife, Ellen, as a wedding present. John Rimbauer owned an oil company, and used much of his wealth to build the mansion, which was in the Tudor-Gothic style and situated on 40 acres (160,000 m^{2}) of woodland in the heart of Seattle, Washington. The site was a Native American burial ground (a common motif in early works by author Stephen King). The house appeared cursed even as it was being constructed: Three construction workers were killed on the site, and a construction foreman was murdered by a co-worker.

Various entries in the fictional diary also describe Ellen Rimbauer's naiveté regarding sexual matters. In sometimes graphic language, the novel's "diary entries" discuss Ellen's sexual relationship with her physically, sexually, and emotionally abusive husband; her growing awareness of her lesbianism (or possible bisexuality; the novel is unclear); her friendship and sexual relationship with Sukeena; the birth of her children; and her growing dislike (even hatred) of her misogynistic, arrogant husband. The novel portrays Ellen Rimbauer as a victim of sexual repression and Victorian morality.

== History of Rose Red ==
The diary reveals how, while vacationing in Africa during the construction of her home, Ellen Rimbauer fell deathly ill and made the acquaintance of Sukeena, a local tribeswoman who nursed her back to health. Ellen and Sukeena became close, and Sukeena accompanied the Rimbauers back to the United States to work full-time at the now-completed Rose Red. The Rimbauers had a son, Adam, and a daughter, April (born with a withered left arm). Bizarre deaths and unresolved disappearances began to occur at the house. Many servants disappeared and one of John Rimbauer's friends died in the solarium from an allergic reaction to a bee sting. John Rimbauer's business partner (whom Rimbauer had cheated out of his part of their oil fortune) hanged himself in the parlor in front of the Rimbauer children. Six-year-old April also disappeared in the house, never to be seen again. Sukeena was the last person to see April alive before she vanished and was tortured by the local police after being suspected of April's murder. After April's disappearance, eight-year-old Adam was sent to a boarding school and kept away from Rose Red. Soon thereafter, John Rimbauer (whom his wife suspected of adultery) committed suicide by throwing himself through a stained glass window in the mansion's tower (an event which the reader later learns was actually murder, committed by Ellen and Sukeena).

As the novel's plot progresses, Ellen Rimbauer and Sukeena continued to live in the house and became very close. After a life-changing seance, Ellen came to believe that if she never stopped building the house, she would be immortal and never die. So Ellen used nearly all of her dead husband's fortune to enlarge the home significantly over the next several decades (a plot element reminiscent of the real-life construction of the Winchester Mystery House). According to Ellen, the house telepathically spoke to her and told her what it wanted constructed. Ellen did what the house wanted because the house promised to return April if she did. Mysterious disappearances continued: Deanna Petrie, a glamorous actress and friend of Ellen's (who was also rumored to have had a sexual relationship with her) vanished within the house while attending a party in the 1940s. A few years after, Sukeena disappeared and only Ellen and a few servants occupied the property. This is where the fictional diary entries which comprise the novel's body end.

In the fictional afterword, Ellen Rimbauer's grandson, Steven Rimbauer, notes that Ellen herself disappeared in the house in 1950. The "afterword" also relates that, for several years after Ellen Rimbauer's disappearance, only servants occupied Rose Red. All eventually left out of fear. Adam Rimbauer inherited the house and lived there for a short time with his wife, but left after witnessing several paranormal events. After Adam Rimbauer's death, his wife sold off many of the home's antique furnishings. She generated some income by permitting the fictional "Seattle Historical Society" to give tours of the house; these ceased in 1972 after a participant disappeared while on a tour of the mansion. Investigations of the grounds and structure were conducted in the 1960s and 1970s to seek an explanation for the strange sounds, lights, and other phenomena alleged to have occurred there. But these ended, and the house fell into disrepair. In all, 26 people disappeared or died at Rose Red.

The novel's "afterword" concludes by relating that a paranormal investigation into Rose Red by Dr. Joyce Reardon led to the deaths of several participants, and the home was demolished to make way for condominiums.

== Reception ==
The companion novel was a hit, rising high on several bestseller lists. For example, it debuted in the #4 slot on USA Today's best-selling fiction list in January 2002, and in the #15 slot on The New York Times' best-selling fiction list. It rose to #1 on the Publishers Weekly best-selling fiction list for the week ending February 16, 2002.

The book was not widely reviewed. USA Today called the book "clever, beautifully detailed fiction." The Daily Evergreen qualified its review, but declared: "Considering everything, this book was quite entertaining. It's one of those books that is difficult to stop reading. The scare element wasn't too terribly high, but the fact Pearson and King marketed the book as an authentic diary makes it all the more enjoyable to read." But the Christian Science Monitor gave it an "Unfavorable Review" rating, unhappy with the book's violence and explicit depictions of sexuality.
