= Rose Red (miniseries) =

2002 television miniseries directed by Craig R. Baxley

- Promotional print ad
- Written by: Stephen King
- Directed by: Craig R. Baxley
- Starring: Nancy Travis; Matt Keeslar; Julian Sands; Kimberly J. Brown; David Dukes; Judith Ivey; Melanie Lynskey; Matt Ross; Kevin Tighe; Julia Campbell; Emily Deschanel; Laura Kenny; Tsidii Le Loka; Yvonne Sciò; Jimmi Simpson
- Music by: Gary Chang
- Original language: English
- No. of episodes: 3

Production
- Producers: Thomas H. Brodek; Robert F. Phillips
- Cinematography: David Connell
- Editor: Sonny Baskin
- Running time: 255 minutes
- Production companies: Mark Carliner Productions; Victor Television Productions
- Budget: $35 million

Original release
- Network: ABC
- Release: January 27 – January 29, 2002

Related
- The Diary of Ellen Rimbauer

Rose Red is a 2002 American three-episode horror television miniseries scripted by horror novelist Stephen King, directed by Craig R. Baxley, and starring Nancy Travis, Matt Keeslar, Julian Sands, Kimberly J. Brown, David Dukes, Melanie Lynskey, Matt Ross, Emily Deschanel, Judith Ivey, and Kevin Tighe. It was filmed in Lakewood, Washington. The plot focuses on a reputedly haunted mansion located in Seattle, Washington, named Rose Red. Due to its long history of supernatural events and unexplained tragedies, the house is investigated by parapsychologist Dr. Joyce Reardon and a team of gifted psychics.

Steven Spielberg had asked Stephen King to write a haunted house story. Stephen King presented the idea for Rose Red to Steven Spielberg in 1996, envisioning it as a loose remake of Robert Wise's 1963 film The Haunting (which itself was based on Shirley Jackson's 1959 novel The Haunting of Hill House). In 1999, a feature film remake of The Haunting was released, after which King's script was revised and expanded into a miniseries. In writing the teleplay, King incorporated a variety of influences, including elements of Jackson's novel as well as the Winchester Mystery House in San Jose, California. The setting changed from Los Angeles to Seattle after the production team secured the Thornewood Estate in Lakewood as a shooting location. Rose Red was filmed in the fall of 2000 in Seattle and Lakewood with principal photography concluding in mid-December. Post-production lasted approximately six months, during which various special effects were implemented into the series.

ABC provided Rose Red with a $200,000 marketing campaign, which included extensive advertising. In addition to television commercials, an elaborate campaign was launched to make the fictional mansion and its history appear real; this included a fake website for the fictional Beaumont University, the university featured in the film, as well as the publication of The Diary of Ellen Rimbauer: My Life at Rose Red (2001), a novel purportedly written by the fictional character of Ellen Rimbauer, the wife of the estate's owner, and edited by the miniseries' fictional protagonist, Dr. Joyce Reardon.

Rose Red premiered in the United States on ABC on January 27, 2002, running for three consecutive nights, during which it accrued a viewership of over 18.5 million.

== Plot ==
Dr. Joyce Reardon, an unorthodox university psychology professor, leads a team of psychics to the massive and antiquated Seattle mansion known as Rose Red in an attempt to record data that would constitute scientific proof of paranormal phenomena. The mansion is publicly thought to be haunted, as at least 23 people have either disappeared or died there and the interior of the house appears to change or increase in size, yet only from the inside. Reardon's team awakens the evil spirit possessing the house, leading to several deaths and the revelation of the mansion's deadly secrets.

=== History of Rose Red ===
According to information revealed at various points in the miniseries, and Ellen's diary, Rose Red was built in 1906 by wealthy oilman John Rimbauer as a wedding gift for his young wife, Ellen. Rimbauer used much of his wealth to build the mansion, which was in the Tudor-Gothic style and situated on 40 acres (160,000 m^{2}) of woodland in the heart of Seattle on the site of a Native American burial ground. The house was rumored to be cursed even as it was being constructed; three construction workers were killed on the site, and a construction foreman was murdered by a co-worker.

While honeymooning in Africa, Ellen Rimbauer fell ill (from an unspecified sexually transmitted disease given to her by her unfaithful husband) and made the acquaintance of Sukeena, a local tribeswoman. The two women became very close while Sukeena nursed Ellen back to health, and Sukeena accompanied the Rimbauers back to the newly completed Rose Red to work there full-time as a servant. The Rimbauers soon had two children, Adam and April, the latter born with a withered arm, but Ellen quickly became unhappy with her marriage to her philandering, neglectful, and misogynistic husband. After a spiritualist seance, Ellen came to believe that if she continued to build and expand the house, she would never die.

Bizarre deaths and unresolved disappearances became more commonplace at the house throughout the years. Several female servants disappeared and one of John Rimbauer's friends died of a bee sting in the solarium, while his business partner (whom Rimbauer had cheated out of his share of the oil company's profits) hanged himself in front of Rimbauer's children in the parlor room of Rose Red. Six-year-old April also vanished while playing in the kitchen, never to be seen or heard from again, leaving only her doll in the chair she was last seen sitting in. Sukeena, who was babysitting April, was the last person to see her alive and was tortured mercilessly by the local police after being suspected of April's murder. During April's disappearance, eight-year-old Adam was sent off to attend boarding school and kept away from the house as much as possible. John Rimbauer died in an apparent suicide by throwing himself from an upper stained-glass window; in actuality, he was murdered by Ellen and Sukeena.

Ellen used nearly all of her dead husband's fortune to continually add to the home over the next several decades, enlarging it significantly. The mysterious disappearances continued to occur: a famous actress and dear friend of Ellen's, Deanna Petrie, vanished in the house's billiard room during a party in the 1940s. By the 1950s, both Ellen Rimbauer and Sukeena had disappeared in Rose Red.

For several years after Ellen's disappearance, only servants occupied Rose Red. Eventually, all left one by one out of fear. Adam Rimbauer, who inherited the house, lived there for a short time with his wife. He abandoned Rose Red after witnessing several paranormal events, such as the ghost of his long-lost little sister April, and watching rooms alter their size and shape before his very eyes. After his death, and with the family fortune depleted, his wife generated income by permitting the Seattle Historical Society to give tours of the house. These ceased in 1972 after a female participant disappeared while on a tour of the mansion. Investigations for paranormal phenomena were conducted on the property in the 1960s and 1970s. But these also ended, and the house fell into disrepair. By the time the miniseries begins, it is considered to be a dead cell.

The miniseries begins in the year 2001. Steven Rimbauer, the great-grandson of John and Ellen Rimbauer, has inherited Rose Red. He has been offered a substantial sum of money to have the house torn down and the site developed into condominiums. He is Joyce Reardon's boyfriend, and while Steve doesn't share her enthusiasm over the paranormal history of the house, particularly the fact that it claimed the lives of several members of his family, he has agreed to allow one more investigation of the mansion.

=== Part 1 ===
In 1991 Seattle, young Annie Wheaton is drawing a picture of a house as her parents and older sister, Rachel, argue outside her room. As she draws lines down over the house in her picture, rocks fall through the roof of an identical house belonging to an elderly couple down the street whose dog had bitten Annie, severely damaging the building.

Ten years later in 2001, Dr. Joyce Reardon is a professor at the fictional Beaumont University who teaches classes on psychic phenomena. Kevin Bollinger, a reporter for the campus newspaper, skeptically questions her about a trip she will be taking to Rose Red, an ostensibly haunted and abandoned mansion in Seattle. Professor Carl Miller, Joyce's departmental chair who questions the validity of Joyce's research, orders Bollinger to follow Reardon and spy on a meeting with the group of psychics she is taking to Rose Red. The group includes Victor "Vic" Kandinsky, an elderly precognate with heart disease; Pam Asbury, a young psychometric; Cathy Kramer, a middle-aged automatic writer; Nick Hardaway, a telepath with remote viewing capabilities; and Emery Waterman, a young post-cognate. The group meets with Steve Rimbauer, the last descendant of Ellen and John Rimbauer, in an auditorium at the college. Bollinger takes a photo of the group joining hands in a circle, and the photo and an article ridiculing Joyce are published in the campus newspaper. Dr. Miller takes Bollinger to Rose Red and drops him off, instructing him to obtain additional embarrassing photos once the group of psychics arrives. The reporter is greeted by Sukeena at the front door, who tells him that he is expected. Not realizing she is a ghost, Bollinger enters the mansion. He becomes trapped in the solarium, where he is pulled off-screen by an unseen force.

The back-stories of psychics Emery Waterman and Annie Wheaton are introduced. Emery Waterman is a rude, sarcastic, and obnoxious young man under the control of his domineering mother, Patricia Waterman; when he sees spirits from Rose Red, he caustically tells them they can't scare him off because he needs the money. The audience learns that Rachel Wheaton now cares for Annie Wheaton, who rarely speaks and refers to Rachel as "Sister." The audience also learns that Joyce is having a sexual affair with Steve, although the film remains unclear whether she loves him or is merely using him to gain access to Rose Red.

=== Part 2 ===
Joyce and the group of psychics, now joined by Rachel "Sister" Wheaton and a teenaged Annie Wheaton, arrive at Rose Red. The team tours the mansion. Joyce and Steve point out that the home contains many optical illusions as well as an upside-down room and a library with a mirrored floor. The team finds Bollinger's cell phone, and Steve calls Miller to confront him over his attempt to discredit the group. That night, Emery sees the ghost of an actress who disappeared from the house decades earlier; Pam dreams of the decomposing body of Kevin Bollinger; the Wheaton sisters are visited by a ghost under the bed and in the closet; and Cathy sees something moving under the carpet and her blankets. Later in the night, Pam is lured outside by a doppelganger into the garden pond and is presumably drowned.

The next morning, when Dr. Miller receives Steve's voicemail message, it instead says that Bollinger slit his wrists and wrote Miller's name in his blood before expiring. The message unnerves Dr. Miller and he goes to the mansion to learn more. Patricia Waterman also has driven to the mansion after being unable to reach her son via his cell phone. The two arrive simultaneously, and their cars collide in the driveway when Mrs. Waterman swerves to avoid what she believes to be a figure running across the road. Terrified, Mrs. Waterman begins to run through the forest on the grounds of the mansion while calling for her son. Miller, wanting to get her insurance information, pursues her. Inside Rose Red, Emery hears his mother's cries but dismisses them as an auditory illusion created by the haunted house.

On the other side of the house, Pam leads Vic into the garden toward a pond with a statue of Ellen in it. She suddenly disappears. When Vic looks down into the pond, he sees what he believes to be Pam's dead body. He attempts to pull her out of the water, but the body vanishes and he is left clutching only her nightgown. He panics and runs back toward the house. Looking back, he sees the statue come to life and has a heart attack. Vic tries to draw the attention of Emery (who is inside the house), but Emery again believes this to be an apparition and refuses to open the window. Nick arrives and tries to open the window, but it will not open and the glass cannot be broken. Vic collapses and dies in full view of Emery and Nick. Out in the woods, Mrs. Waterman is stopped and knocked unconscious by the ghost of Kevin Bollinger.

=== Part 3 ===
Annie Wheaton has discovered a dollhouse that is a miniature replica of Rose Red. While standing on a chair in an attempt to reach the dollhouse, she falls and is knocked unconscious. Rachel Wheaton and Steve Rimbauer see her fall and attempt to render first aid. Meanwhile, on the other side of the house, Rose Red's windows and doors mysteriously open again. Emery Waterman, realizing that his mother's screams were not an illusion, rushes outside to look for his mother. He runs into Dr. Miller, who warns him to stay away, and then flees. Emery chases Miller but cannot catch him, so he returns to Rose Red. Miller, continuing to frantically run around the grounds of the house, is found and attacked by the ghost of Kevin Bollinger.

Emery attempts to convince the others that they should all leave. They refuse, and Emery tries to depart on his own. As he does so, he runs into the ghosts of Pam Asbury and Deanna Petrie (Yvonne Sciò), the movie star who vanished in the house in the 1940s. Emery has the power to make apparitions disappear by repeating the phrase "not there," and avoids the deadly fate of his mother and Dr. Miller. As Emery is about to leave Rose Red, Annie Wheaton wakes and via psychokinesis causes the doors of Rose Red to slam shut. Emery's hand is caught in the door, and some of his fingers are severed. While the others assist Emery, Joyce Reardon asks Annie to continue to keep the doors and windows sealed, promising to give her the dollhouse if she does so. However, Steve soon discovers that he can communicate with Annie telepathically, and she begins to form a friendship with him.

Later, Steve relives some repressed memories of a visit to the house with his drunken mother during which a ghostly Ellen Rimbauer appeared to him and called on Steve to aid her in continuing Rose Red's unending construction. Meanwhile, Emery suspects that Annie, not some "spirit of Rose Red," is keeping the house sealed. Nick confirms Emery's suspicions and then informs the group that Bollinger appeared to have hanged himself in the library. The group begins to speculate that Rose Red has never been a dead cell, merely dormant, and that the mansion's supernatural powers are linked to Annie and Steve (whose psychic abilities become apparent only when he is in the house because of his familial connection to the property). Nick correctly guesses that Joyce brought the psychics to the house in an attempt to reawaken Rose Red rather than simply investigate it.

The wounded Emery suggests that Annie be killed to allow everyone to escape, alarming the rest of the group. While in the kitchen, Cathy Kramer is attacked by Mrs. Waterman and is rescued by Nick. The two decide to tie up the deranged woman and leave her in the kitchen. They agree not to inform Emery so that the unstable young man does not become more unbalanced. A ghostly Sukeena appears and drags Mrs. Waterman off into the dark wine cellar. As Nick and Cathy head back toward the main hall, the house changes around them and they become lost. A mysterious shape under the carpet chases them, and they flee. The shape begins to catch up to them, and Nick shoves Cathy into a room, saving her life, and slams the door behind her, turning around just in time to see a skeletal monster rushing up to him. With silence in the hallway, Cathy opens the door again but finds no sign of Nick or the entity in the empty hallway. As the house continues to change around her, Cathy ends up in the attic. Suddenly overcome by the urge to automatically write, she witnesses the murder of John Rimbauer by Ellen and Sukeena. Steve and Rachel, meanwhile, decide to look for Nick and Cathy. They find Cathy in the attic, where she is about to be attacked by a corpse-like creature. Their presence seemingly prevents the house from acting, and the corpse drops lifeless to the floor. The corpse's withered arm lets them deduce that the carcass is that of Steven's missing great-aunt (and Ellen's daughter), April Rimbauer. Suddenly, April's corpse releases a bright white light from its mouth and instantly disintegrates.

The group reunites in the main hall. Emery attempts to attack Annie with a fireplace poker. Using psychokinesis, Annie animates a suit of armor and attempts to indirectly attack Emery with its halberd. It is unclear whether either is genuinely attempting to kill the other: Emery had previously stated that knocking Annie unconscious should be sufficient to escape, while the placement of Annie's final halberd attack suggests that it was a warning shot. Neither attack succeeds, and Joyce calms both individuals. In an attempt to uncover the secret of Rose Red, Steve creates a telepathic link between Cathy and Annie, and Cathy begins to engage in automatic writing. Annie begins to draw pictures of boulders striking the house, smashed doors, and broken glass, and soon doors and windows all over the house are opening and closing violently, and glass in the windows shatters. Rocks begin to fall, destroying Mrs. Waterman's car and causing severe damage to Rose Red. Cathy automatically writes "help us" and "open the doors," prompting Annie to unseal the house. Steve, Emery, Cathy, and the Wheatons make their escape from Rose Red, but Joyce, now clearly insane, refuses to leave. The group is attacked by the spectre of Ellen Rimbauer, but Annie prevents Ellen from coming after them. Mrs. Waterman's ghost leaps from a mirror and attempts to draw Emery into the spirit realm, but Emery, with the assistance of Steve and Cathy, resists his mother for the first time in his life, and Mrs. Waterman vanishes again. The survivors flee to the van as boulders rain down on Rose Red. Back in the house, Joyce suddenly realizes too late that she does want to leave, but is surrounded by the ghosts of Rose Red: Nick, Pam, Vic, Mrs. Waterman, Miller, Bollinger, Sukeena, and Deanna Petrie. Joyce screams incoherently in terror as the film fades to black.

Six months later, the survivors visit Rose Red, just before the mansion is due to be demolished and replaced by condominiums. They pay their last respects to the dead by laying red roses on the path leading up to the house. As they drive away, the ghosts of Ellen Rimbauer, Sukeena, and Joyce watch the survivors depart from the tower window.

== Cast ==
=== Characters in the present ===
- Nancy Travis as Dr. Joyce Reardon, professor of parapsychology
- Matt Keeslar as Steve Rimbauer, descendant of Rimbauer family
- Melanie Lynskey as Rachel "Sissy" Wheaton, a waitress and elder sister of Annie
- Kimberly J. Brown as Annie Wheaton, an autistic teenager with telekinetic powers
- Judith Ivey as Cathy Kramer, research group member and automatic writer
- Matt Ross as Emery Waterman, psychic with retrocognition, former assistant to homicide detectives
- Julian Sands as Nick Hardaway, telepathic psychologist
- Emily Deschanel as Pam Asbury, a psychic television host with psychometric abilities
- Kevin Tighe as Victor "Vic" Kandinsky, psychic with precognition
- David Dukes as Dr. Carl Miller, psychology department head
- Laura Kenny as Patricia Waterman, mother of Emery Waterman
- Jimmi Simpson as Kevin Bollinger, college newspaper reporter
- Richard Sanders as Mr. Stanton, elderly neighbor of Rachel and Annie
- Stephen King as Pizza Delivery Man

=== Characters from the past ===
- John Procaccino as John P. Rimbauer, oil tycoon, original owner of Rose Red; murdered by Ellen and Sukeena
- Julia Campbell as Ellen Gilchrist-Rimbauer, wife of John; disappeared at Rose Red
- Tsidii Le Loka as Sukeena, Ellen's maid; disappeared at Rose Red
- Justin T. Milner as Adam Rimbauer, son of John and Ellen
- Paige Gordon as April Rimbauer, daughter of John and Ellen; disappeared at Rose Red
- Yvonne Sciò as Deanna Petrie, actress and friend of Ellen; disappeared at Rose Red
- Don Alder as Douglas Posey, John's ex-business partner; committed suicide at Rose Red

== Production ==
=== Conception ===
Steven Spielberg asked Stephen King to write a haunted house story. King had always wanted to write a script about a haunted house, having been inspired by an alleged haunted house in his home town of Durham, Maine. King originally pitched the idea for Rose Red to Steven Spielberg as a feature film in 1996, partly a loose remake of the 1963 film The Haunting. The project went into turnaround and a complete script was written, but Spielberg demanded more thrills and action sequences while King wanted more horror. King and Spielberg mutually agreed to shelve the project after several years of work, and King bought back the rights to the script. King returned to the project in 1999, completed a revised script, and unsuccessfully pitched the script to director Mick Garris (with whom King had worked on the 1992 film Sleepwalkers, the 1994 TV miniseries The Stand, and the 1997 TV miniseries The Shining). King next proposed the project on Friday, June 18, 1999, to producer Mark Carliner (with whom King had worked on two miniseries, The Shining and 1999's Storm of the Century). Carliner agreed to produce the script as a feature film, and King agreed to start script revisions on Monday, June 21. Unfortunately, King was hit by an automobile while walking on a road near his home on Saturday, June 19, 1999, and needed time to recuperate.

=== Writing ===
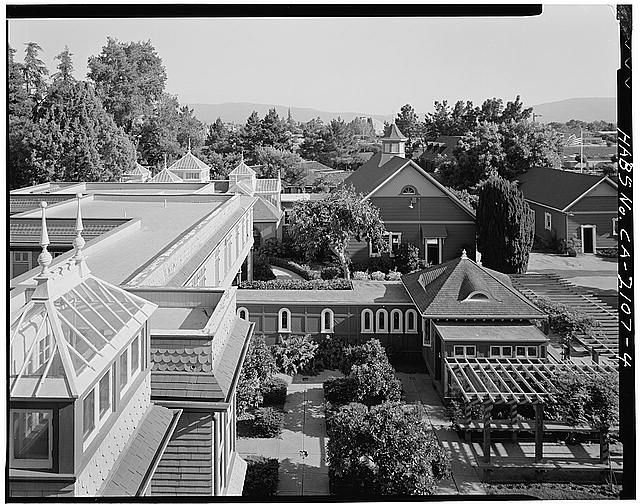
The Winchester Mystery House served as an inspiration for King while writing Rose Red

After surgery and a month's recovery in the hospital, King returned home and completed work on the Rose Red script over the next month, recasting the project as a television miniseries. He would later state that in converting the screenplay into a miniseries teleplay, he found the miniseries format more conducive to his writing style, specifically because the detail-oriented nature of his writing: "I'm a putter-in-'er rather than a take-'er-outer," he said. The writing proved to be therapeutic:

I was using the work as dope, basically, because it worked better than anything they were giving me to kill the pain. It was very difficult to push the pen 45 minutes a day, but it was vital to get back to work, because you have to break the ice somehow. You have to say, "This is what I do." I'm either going to continue to work, or I'm not. You say, "If I can do this, maybe I can walk. If I can walk, maybe I can resume some kind of human intercourse." Work seemed like a logical place to start.

King partly based his concept for Rose Red on the Winchester Mystery House in San Jose, California, but added the concept that the house could appear larger and different on the inside even though it looked the same from the outside. The action was originally set in Los Angeles, California, and the production crew scouted the Winchester Mystery House as a possible filming location. Although the project was no longer intended to be an adaptation of The Haunting of Hill House, the script continued to borrow heavily from Shirley Jackson's novel. The team of researchers strongly resembles that assembled in Jackson's novel, and the rain of rocks is identical to one described in Jackson's story.

Pre-production began in July 2000. After a five-month search for a shooting location, the producers discovered Thornewood Castle in Lakewood, Washington, and secured permission to use the mansion as the façade of Rose Red. King subsequently rewrote elements of script and set the action in Seattle, Washington, to accommodate the change. The production paid $500,000 to have many of the rooms on the first floor of Thornewood restored to their early 20th-century state for filming of the miniseries. At the time, the main floor of the house had been partially converted into apartments. Dead trees and dead ivy were used to make Thornewood appear abandoned.

=== Filming and post-production ===
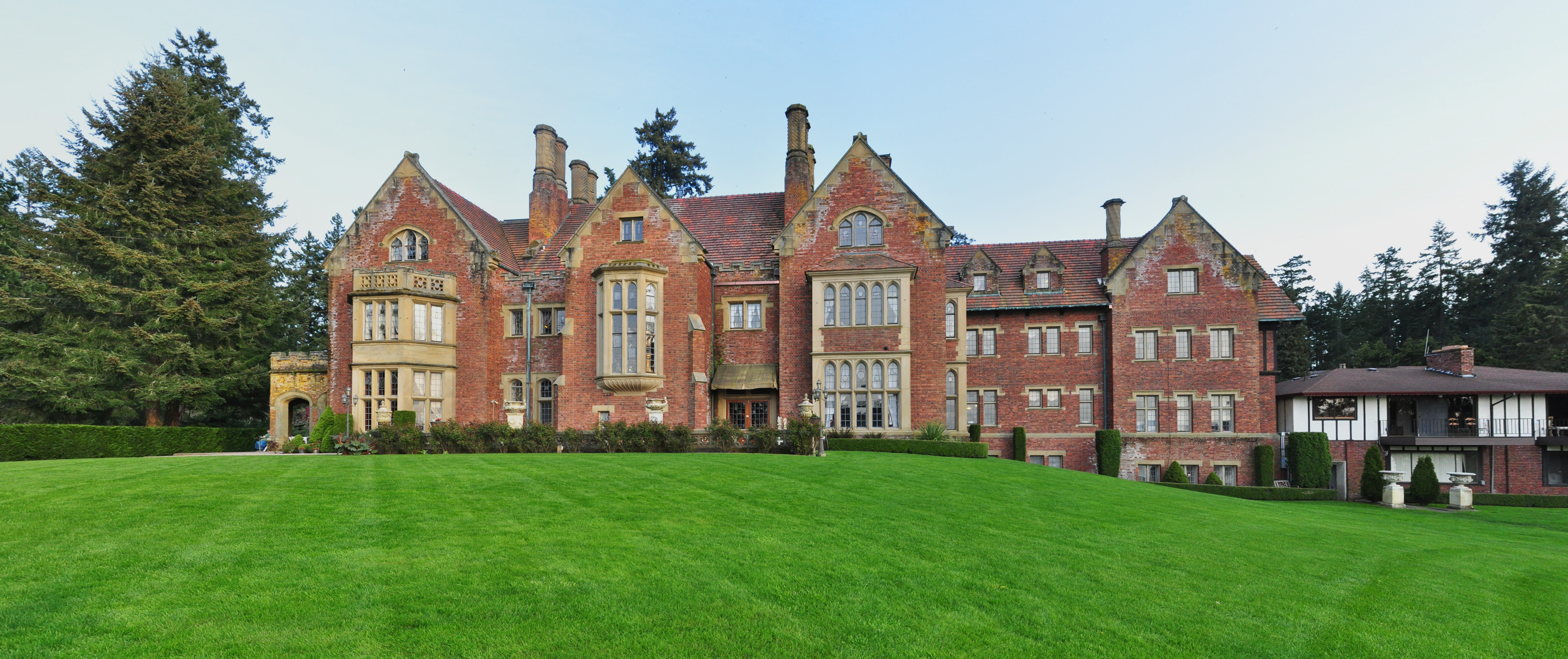

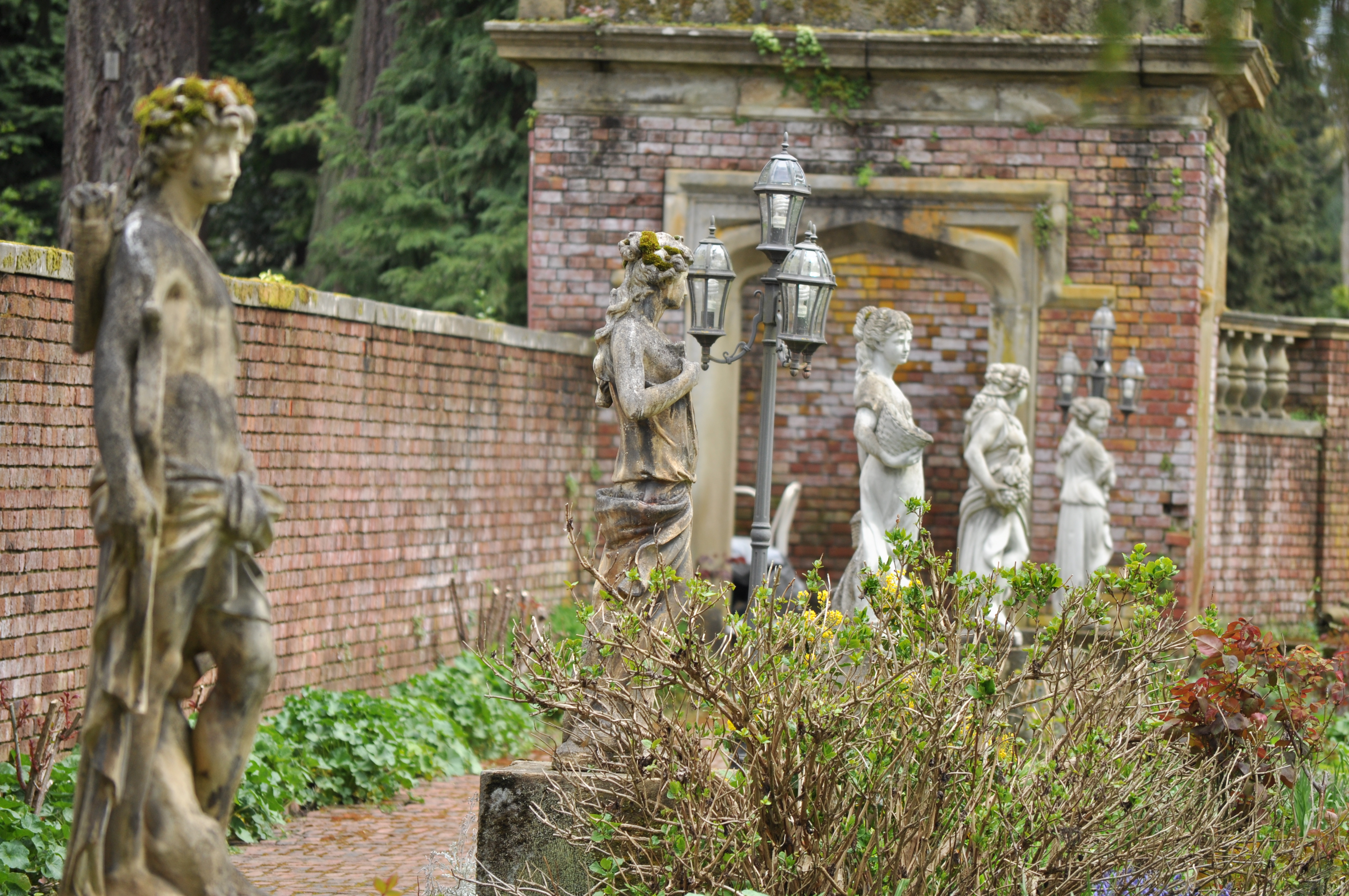
Thornewood Estate and the surrounding grounds in Lakewood, Washington served as the exteriors for Rose Red

The production team included producers Carliner, Thomas H. Brodek, and Robert F. Phillips; director Craig R. Baxley; production designer Craig Stearns; and visual effects supervisor Stuart Robertson (who won the Academy Award for Best Visual Effects for his work on the 1997 film What Dreams May Come). These individuals and others had worked on Storm of the Century two years earlier.

Shooting of Rose Red began on August 22, 2000, and ended in mid-December 2000 in the Seattle metropolitan area. The budget for the miniseries was slightly more than $35 million. Interior sets were built between May and October 2000 in three former airplane hangars at the abandoned Sand Point Naval Base in Seattle. More than 200,000 square feet (19,000 m^{2}) of interior sets were built. The largest set contained a full-scale version of the great hall at Rose Red, including a fireplace, columns, grand staircase, adjacent dining hall, and doorway to the solarium (the last being a feature inspired by the Shirley Jackson novel). Two bedrooms and the billiard room at Thornewood Castle were used for on-location shoots. The intersection of Spring Street and Seventh Avenue in Seattle was used for the fictional location of Rose Red; other Seattle locations used in the miniseries include a section of Main Street and a house in Mount Baker (this is the home destroyed by a rain of stones in the miniseries). Additional photography took place on the University of Washington campus (standing in for Beaumont University), and in the Arctic Building, whose interior dome is displayed in the library of Rose Red.

Actor David Dukes died of a heart attack on October 9, 2000, in Spanaway, Washington, while shooting Rose Red. He was due to film his death scene the following day. A double was used for shots of his character running through foliage, and King rewrote some scenes to feature other characters instead of Miller.

The computer-operated ghost puppets created by XFX cost $150,000 each. Post-production took six months, and the miniseries was delivered to the ABC television network in early September 2001.

== Release ==
Rose Red originally aired on the ABC broadcast television network in the United States over three nights, from January 27–29, 2002.

=== Marketing ===
Promotion for Rose Red was a "carefully-staged media event" leading up to its release. A $200,000 promotional marketing campaign for the miniseries began in November 2000. Marketing of the film presented the movie as based on actual events. Before the miniseries aired, the producers contracted with author Ridley Pearson to write a tie-in novel, The Diary of Ellen Rimbauer: My Life at Rose Red, under the pseudonym "Dr. Joyce Reardon" (one of the main characters of the miniseries). The novel presented itself as nonfiction, and claimed to be the actual diary of Ellen Rimbauer (wife of the builder of Rose Red). The work was originally intended to be an architectural book featuring photos and drawings of the fictional Rose Red house with the supernatural elements subtly woven into the text and photos, but Pearson (building on several references to a diary in King's script) wrote it as Ellen Rimbauer's diary instead. Inspired by the 1999 film The Blair Witch Project, King came up with the idea of presenting the novel as real by having "Dr. Joyce Reardon" edit the "diary". King also inserted a reference into the book's foreword that a "best-selling author had found the journal in Maine", so that fans would be misled into concluding that King had written the work. The ruse worked. Fans and the press speculated for some time that Stephen King or his wife Tabitha King had written the book until Pearson was revealed to be the novel's author. The companion novel was a hit, rising high on several bestseller lists. Intended to be a promotional item rather than a stand-alone work, its popularity spawned a 2003 prequel television miniseries to Rose Red, titled The Diary of Ellen Rimbauer. The novel tie-in idea was repeated on Stephen King's next project, the miniseries Kingdom Hospital. Richard Dooling, King's collaborator on Kingdom Hospital and writer of several episodes in the miniseries, published a fictional diary, The Journals of Eleanor Druse, in 2004.

A fictional website for Beaumont University (where Dr. Joyce Reardon, one of the main characters in the miniseries, taught parapsychology) was established. It provided information on the history of Rose Red, background on the Rimbauer family, and limited information on various disappearances at the mansion. The site is no longer functional, but can still be viewed through web archive programs such as the Wayback Machine. The marketing campaign was considered highly successful, with many readers believing that The Diary of Ellen Rimbauer was real. The fake Beaumont University site was bombarded with emails from fans who were convinced that Dr. Joyce Reardon, Beaumont University, and Rose Red were real.

=== Critical reception ===
Rose Red, which aired during sweeps, was a ratings hit with an average of 18.5 million viewers over three nights and an 8.5 rating.

Critical reception to the miniseries was mixed. The New York Times called it fun if not terribly original:

Most of the way, the cast, directed by Craig R. Baxley, show restraint (under the circumstances). Until they are overwhelmed by the inevitable unraveling of reason, Ms. Travis's Joyce and Mr. Sands's Nick are two people you would definitely want along the next time you bunk down in a ghostly manse. The production, including Stuart Robertson's visual effects, serves the story without overwhelming it. Rose Red is a clever tale to the end. You'll never be tempted to take it seriously. But if you let it hook you, you won't be tempted to turn it off.

Another critic noted that, while the miniseries moves along "effectively", the effort seemed "padded to more than four hours" with "needless exposition ... and repetitious spookhouse sequences". Daily Variety was more critical of the miniseries, however, noting that "All of the elements that make a King story so accessible and entertaining are missing from this production." Daily Variety praised director Craig Baxley's direction, cinematographer David Connell's camera work, Craig Stearns' special effects and production design, and young actress Kimberly Brown's performance. But the magazine concluded that the over-long script and "backstories, particularly the origin of the house, are so convoluted and ill conceived, even the best f/x can't save the day." Critic Laura Fries had particularly severe criticism for actress Nancy Travis:

It's hard to say whether or not Travis is simply the wrong choice for Reardon or if she just took the wrong approach. For the entire mini, the actress grimaces like a rabid dog; her character frothing at the idea of recording psychic anomalies at the expense of everyone around her. Most important, however, she never convincingly demonstrates the kind of power of persuasion it takes to win over strangers to do her character's bidding.

Other critics panned the screenplay as "dumbly, numbly entertaining pastiche" and "a strained struggle for cogent characters and a coherent story line", but praised the production for its sound, visual effects, music, and make-up.

Other reviewers found little to praise in the miniseries, however. "Rose Red is a rambling wreck of a film ... about as scary as a hangnail," said the Seattle Post-Intelligencer. "...It is made-for-TV pablum, meant to satisfy unsophisticated palates the way restaurants make ordinary food seem appetizing with highfalutin menus." USA Today focused on what it felt was a poor story and slow pacing: "...a numbingly predictable series of seen-it-before jolts ... played at exceedingly slow speed." Many critics were unimpressed with the special visual effects which others had found praiseworthy. "Rose Red," said the New York Daily News, "...is a haunted-house story that's told so slowly, it's almost inert. The climactic special effects are even worse, guaranteeing that—should you last to the end—the only screaming you'll be doing is with laughter." Critic and academic Tony Magistrale felt the miniseries over-relied on special effects so much that it felt "oppressive", concluding:

the miniseries spends an excessive amount of time dramatizing the shocking and horrific displays of the house's reanimation and not nearly enough effort examining why any of these displays are relevant to a larger purpose. ... While the film's super-annuated Halloween tricks are often visually and technically stunning, they also tend to weaken the seriousness of Rose Red's storyline and dominate it at the expense of character development.

Most damning of all, he concluded, was the lack of character development: "...there are few characters in the miniseries that we care about—and certainly no one to inspire the heroic imagination, as does Wendy Torrance in the miniseries version of The Shining or Mike Anderson in Storm [of the Century]."

== Intertextuality ==
King's teleplay for Rose Red contains references to various characters from his other works: The character of Annie Wheaton is similar to another Stephen King character, Carrie White—the main character from King's first published novel, Carrie. As a young girl, Carrie telekinetically dropped stones on her house, and Annie does the same thing at both the beginning and end of Rose Red. The epilogue of Carrie contains a brief appearance of a young girl named Annie who, it appears, has the same powers as Carrie.

Rose Red is referred to in King's Black House as one of the places where "slippage" occurs.

== Differences and contradictions ==
The companion novel The Diary of Ellen Rimbauer dates the expedition to the Rose Red mansion as having taken place sometime during or before the year 2000. But the miniseries states that the present day events that show the expedition happen ten years after 1991, while also showing one of the characters holding a bill with a statement dated in the year 2002.

The death of John Rimbauer's partner appears differently in the miniseries than in the novel. In the novel, John is still spending his time near the mansion, while in the miniseries John is said to have been away in Europe at the time. In the novel John's partner Posey gets hit by a popgun accidentally fired by John's son as he falls upon the noose he set around his neck, while in the miniseries John's son only stares as Posey commits suicide.

The mockumentary Unlocking Rose Red: The Diary of Ellen Rimbauer released to promote both the show and the companion novel states that the actress Deanna Petrie disappeared in 1934 rather than in 1946 as revealed in both the companion novel and the show.

== Prequel film ==
A prequel television film, The Diary of Ellen Rimbauer, based on the novel by Pearson, was released in 2003. Unlike Rose Red, King had no involvement.

== Home media ==
Rose Red was released on May 14, 2002 as a two-disc DVD set by Lions Gate Home Entertainment and Trimark Home Video.

== Works cited ==
- Magistrale, Tony (2010). Stephen King: America's Storyteller. ABC-CLIO. ISBN 978-0-313-35228-7.
- Wiater, Stanley; Golden, Christopher; Wagner, Hank (2006). The Complete Stephen King Universe: A Guide to the Worlds of Stephen King. St. Martin's Press. ISBN 978-1-429-93145-8.
- Wood, Rocky (2011). Stephen King: A Literary Companion. McFarland Literary Companions. McFarland. ISBN 978-0-786-48546-8.
