= The Diary of Ellen Rimbauer (film) =

2003 television film directed by Craig R. Baxley

- DVD cover
- Based on: Rose Red by Stephen King The Diary of Ellen Rimbauer: My Life at Rose Red by Ridley Pearson
- Teleplay by: Ridley Pearson
- Directed by: Craig R. Baxley
- Starring: Lisa Brenner; Steven Brand; Tsidii Le Loka
- Theme music composer: Gary Chang

Production
- Producer: Thomas H. Brodek
- Cinematography: João Fernandes
- Editor: Sonny Baskin
- Running time: 88 minutes
- Production companies: Greengrass Productions; Mark Carliner Productions; Victor Television Productions; Buena Vista Television

Original release
- Network: ABC
- Release: May 12, 2003

The Diary of Ellen Rimbauer is a 2003 American television film directed by Craig R. Baxley, and starring Lisa Brenner, Steven Brand, and Tsidii Le Loka. It is a prequel to the miniseries Rose Red (2002), and is based on the 2001 novel by Ridley Pearson, which itself is an accompaniment piece to the miniseries. The film premiered on ABC on May 12, 2003.

== Plot ==
The film is an adaptation of The Diary of Ellen Rimbauer: My Life at Rose Red (2001), written by Ridley Pearson under the pseudonym Joyce Reardon, PhD. Pearson's novel was based on the script of Stephen King's Rose Red.

The plot revolves around the construction of the Rimbauer mansion, Rose Red, in Seattle, Washington, tracing a series of mysterious accidents throughout the mansion's early history which cause it to become cursed. Set at the turn of the 20th century, the stately, sinister mansion is constructed by powerful Seattle oil magnate John Rimbauer (Steven Brand) as a wedding present for his timid, submissive young bride, Ellen (Lisa Brenner). Rimbauer uses much of his wealth to build the mansion in the Tudor neo-Gothic style and situate it on 40 acres (16 ha) of woodland. The site has been a Native American burial ground. The house appeared cursed even as it was being constructed: three construction workers are killed on the site, and a construction foreman is murdered by a co-worker.

Shortly after her marriage to Rimbauer, Ellen begins keeping a diary in which she confesses her anxieties about her new marriage, expresses her confusion over her emerging sexuality, and contemplates the nightmare that her life is becoming. Ellen soon has two children which helps soothe her painful relationship with her husband. First, a boy named Adam, and then a girl (born with a deformed withered arm) named April. At first impressed by her husband's extravagance, Ellen eventually hates and fears John, especially when learning unsavory facts about his past. Meanwhile, the number of individual hauntings in the mansion increases, possibly including ghosts of the many people close to John who have mysteriously vanished. Ellen interprets the eerie manifestations as a warning that she, too, may some day disappear without a trace.

Years after her young daughter April also vanishes inside the estate, Ellen and her maid and confidant Sukeena still continue to live in the house. After John's death, Ellen believes that if she continues to build the house, she will never die. She uses nearly all of her inherited fortune to continually add to the home over the next several decades, enlarging it significantly. Rose Red begins growing by itself, adding new hallways, new corridors, new rooms and new staircases seemingly overnight. But mysterious disappearances continue: Deanna Petrie, a famous actress friend of Ellen's, and Sukeena both disappear over the next few years. Ellen herself disappears in 1950, never to be seen again.

== Cast ==
- Lisa Brenner as Ellen Gilchrist-Rimbauer
- Steven Brand as John Rimbauer
- Tsidii Le Loka as Sukeena
- Kate Burton as Connie Posey
- Brad Greenquist as Douglas "Doug" Posey
- Deirdre Quinn as Fanny
- Tsai Chin as Madame Lu
- Hans Altwies as Daniel
- Courtney Taylor Burness as April Rimbauer
- Jacob Pearce Guzman as Adam Rimbauer
- Eric Keenleyside as Jack Finney

== Release ==
=== Television airing ===
The film premiered during sweeps on ABC on May 12, 2003.

=== Critical response ===
Michael Speier of Variety noted the film as an "atmospheric period thriller with kinky lining... an elegantly staged and crisp haunted house primer that could have easily popped up as an A&E production or, minus a few gimmicks, even on PBS." Ron Wertheimer of The New York Times was critical of the performances in the film, adding that "The only memorable sights in these two hours are the close-ups into the wide eyes of Ms. Brenner and the wider eyes of Ms. LeLoka. They both seem to be truly afraid of something, perhaps that someone they know will see this film."

=== Home media ===
The film was released on DVD by Lionsgate on October 14, 2003.
