= Naked Came the Manatee =

1996 novel by Elmore Leonard

- First edition cover.
- Authors: Dave Barry, Carl Hiaasen, Elmore Leonard, Tananarive Due, et al.
- Language: English
- Genre: Mystery, thriller, satire
- Publisher: Putnam
- Publication date: 1996
- Publication place: United States
- Media type: Print (Hardcover and Paperback)
- Pages: 201 pp
- ISBN: 978-0-399-14192-8
- OCLC: 34514685
- Dewey Decimal: 813/.54 20
- LC Class: PS3550.A1 N36 1996

Naked Came the Manatee (ISBN 978-0399141928) is a 1996 mystery thriller parody novel, written by thirteen Florida writers: Carl Hiaasen, Elmore Leonard, Dave Barry, James W. Hall, Edna Buchanan, Les Standiford, Paul Levine, Brian Antoni, Tananarive Due, John Dufresne, Vicki Hendricks, Carolina Hospital, and Evelyn Mayerson. It is composed of thirteen chapters, each written by a different Miami-area writer. It was originally published as a serial in the Miami Herald's Tropic magazine, one chapter per issue, and later published as a single novel. Its title is a reference to the literary hoax Naked Came the Stranger. The book was conceived of and edited by Tom Shroder, then editor of Tropic. Dave Barry came up with the first chapter, which was then handed to the next writer, and so on until Carl Hiaasen had to tie all the loose threads together in the final chapter. Each chapter was written on deadline for publication in the magazine.

The plot involves three crime-solving characters from three of the writers' previous, non-parody, mystery/thriller works – Les Standiford's John Deal, Paul Levine's Jake Lassiter, and Edna Buchanan's Britt Montero – coming together to help an elderly environmentalist and her granddaughter investigate the mystery behind a package delivered by a precocious Miami-area manatee named Booger.

All proceeds from the novel were donated to charity.

== Contents and authors ==
=== Chapter One: Booger ===
by Dave Barry

Two petty thugs, Hector and Phil, after retrieving a mysterious package from a courier off the coast of Cuba, begin arguing over the wheel of their skiff, and collide with "Booger", a manatee that favors the waters near Coconut Grove. Their package goes flying off the boat and snags on Booger's hide.

=== Chapter Two: The Big Wet Sleep ===
by Les Standiford

John Deal takes a shortcut to avoid a traffic jam in Coconut Grove, swerves to avoid a man standing in the road, and his car plunges into the ocean. Deal is saved from drowning by Booger, who nudges him to the surface and into the care of Marion McAlister Williams, a 102-year-old local matron. The package gets snagged on Deal, and Marion hauls them both onto shore.

=== Chapter Three: Biscayne Blues ===
by Paul Levine

Deal consults with attorney Jake Lassiter about suing the City of Miami for whiplash, but they are interrupted by Hector, who Deal has noticed following him. Deciding that the package must be valuable, Lassiter insists on having Marion's granddaughter, Fay Leonard (a dive shop operator) retrieve it. When they open it, they are shocked to find a sealed refrigeration unit containing what appears to be Fidel Castro's severed head.

=== Chapter Four: The L.A. Connection ===
by Edna Buchanan

Hector and Phil kidnap Fay and demand the package in return. Lassiter calls news reporter Britt Montero, needing help to confirm the identity of the head before they trade it for Fay's life.

=== Chapter Five: The Old Woman and the Sea ===
by James W. Hall

Booger, distressed by Fay's abduction, swims to the waters near Marion's home, where she cuts away a variety of debris snagged on his hide, including an identical silver package. When Phil sheepishly admits to Hector that Fay is his ex-wife, they let her go with instructions to retrieve the package from Marion.

=== Chapter Six: Heading to Havana ===
by Carolina Hospital

CIA agent Mike Weston visits Havana and informs a government functionary that the "heads" have gone missing. The official demands that they be recovered within 48 hours, or "the deal is off" and "Fidel will stay put." When Fay returns to Marion, they open the second canister and see what appears to be another severed head resembling Castro's.

=== Chapter Seven: The Lock & Key ===
by Evelyn Mayerson

Fay calls Britt for help, and they meet with Jake. After checking the city morgue for headless bodies, Britt remembers that one of Castro's former lovers, Lilia Sands, lives in Miami, and is rumored to have saved a lock of his hair, which could be used for a DNA comparison.

=== Chapter Eight: Strange Fish ===
by Tananarive Due

After giving them the hair, Lilia receives a phone call advising her that Castro is on his way to Miami. Marion floats up dead, apparently drowned. While Britt is comforting Fay, the elderly fisherman who found Marion passes Fay a key that was clutched in her palm.

=== Chapter Nine: South Beach Serenade ===
by Brian Antoni

John Deal, having won a $9.2 million settlement from the City of Miami, has taken a tropical vacation to Havana, and happens to spot Weston in conversation with Hector, exile politician "Big Joey G.", and Juan Carlos Reyes, a Miami millionaire who aspires to become President of Cuba as soon as Castro is dead.

Britt reluctantly has lunch with Hollywood actor Dash Brandon, who is "researching" a role as an undercover agent masquerading as a news reporter. Britt is shocked to hear from Brandon that a fake Castro head is a prop in his upcoming film and has gone missing, but he received a call saying he can retrieve it at an exclusive club in South Beach that evening.

At the gala opening of the club, a DJ holds up what looks like Fidel Castro's head on a platter. Outside, Juan Carlos Reyes and an anti-Castro paramilitary group storm into the club, having been tipped that a high-ranking Cuban official is going to be there. They inadvertently let the clamoring crowd into the club, under which the glass dance floor breaks and dumps dozens of hapless guests, and the head, into a pool filled with real sharks.

With the key, Fay opens Marion's safe deposit box and is stunned to find nearly a million dollars in cash, along with a note from Marion, admitting that she traded the head she found to some "bad people".

N.B. Juan Carlos Reyes is first mentioned in Chapter Four, and was originally introduced in Edna Buchanan's novel Act of Betrayal.

=== Chapter Ten: Dance of the Manatee ===
by Vicki Hendricks

Booger remembers the night Marion was killed while swimming with him, accosted by two men who hauled her out of the water and demanded the head, then killed her when she said it was already gone. Unable to save her, Booger seized a piece of coral in his mouth and gouged the hull of their boat, sure that he will recognize it the next time he sees it.

Hearing a radio report that a manatee has been injured, Fay and Britt jump aboard Fay's boat and speed to the scene, but are kidnapped at gunpoint by Hector and Joey G.

=== Chapter Eleven: Where Are You Dying Tonight? ===
by John Dufresne

Marion's funeral is attended by most of the characters who have previously appeared, including Marion herself (in ghost form).

N.B. Dufresne opens the chapter with the line, "Call me Booger...", a spoof on Moby-Dick's opening line, "Call me Ishmael."

=== Chapter Twelve: The Odyssey ===
by Elmore Leonard

Coconut Grove police officer Joe Sereno observes two crime scene cleaners at work in a hotel room where two males were gruesomely killed. Looking out the window, Sereno sees a man that strongly resembles Castro (except without the trademark beard) lounging by the hotel's pool.

=== Chapter Thirteen: The Law of the Jungle ===
by Carl Hiaasen

Fay, Britt, Lilia, and the last remaining Castro head are taken to Juan Carlos Reyes's yacht off Bimini by Hector (during the boat ride, Joey G. accidentally chokes to death on conch salad). Reyes has a DNA expert compare a lock of hair taken from Lilia's home to a sample from the head, and is overjoyed when the two match. He has Fay and Britt held incommunicado in the Bahamas while he returns to Miami to triumphantly announce Castro's death and his own candidacy as Cuba's next President.

In actuality, the two heads belonged to two of Castro's doubles, and were to be used in a deal brokered by former U.S. President Jimmy Carter: in exchange for a comfortable retirement in Miami, and access to top-flight medical care, Castro agreed to fake his own death and leave office. Since it was absolutely essential that the heads be kept secret until they were ready to be used, the CIA paid Marion $1 million to get back one, and ensured that the other ended up with Reyes. The DNA samples match because the dead double was also one of Lilia's lovers, and she saved a lock of his hair just as she did the real Castro's. The CIA has already eliminated Hector and Agent Weston (the two bodies found in the previous chapter) to ensure the plot remains secret.

Unfortunately, Castro calls off the deal after taking a short walk on Miami Beach that ends with him being knocked down and mugged (by a man whom Castro recognizes, from the tattoos on his hands, as an ex-convict that Castro himself released from prison and sent to Miami during the Mariel boatlift). Even more harrowing than the crime itself is Officer Sereno's blithe assertion that such incidents are commonplace in South Florida. Declaring that "Miami [is] too damn scary," Castro reunites with Lilia and returns to Cuba.

Juan Carlos Reyes's televised rally to display the head is interrupted by a live broadcast from Havana, in which the real Castro appears. The crowd turns on Reyes, declaring him a fraud. In terror for his life, Reyes runs away and jumps into Biscayne Bay, carrying the head. As with John Deal, Booger is below Reyes in the shallows of the Bay, but this time, Booger has been lulled by a romantic encounter with a female manatee and so does not intervene to save Reyes from being run over by a reckless tourist boat, reflecting, "every mammal for himself."

== See also ==
- Atlanta Nights
- I, Libertine
- Naked Came the Stranger
