= Miami Book Fair International =

Annual book fair and literary festival

Coordinates: 25°46′41.26″N 80°11′25.36″W

Miami Book Fair
- Status: Active
- Genre: Multi-genre
- Venue: Miami Dade College
- Locations: Miami, Florida
- Country: US
- Inaugurated: 1984
- Attendance: 200,000
- Organizer: Miami Book Fair @ Miami Dade College
- Website: www.miamibookfair.com

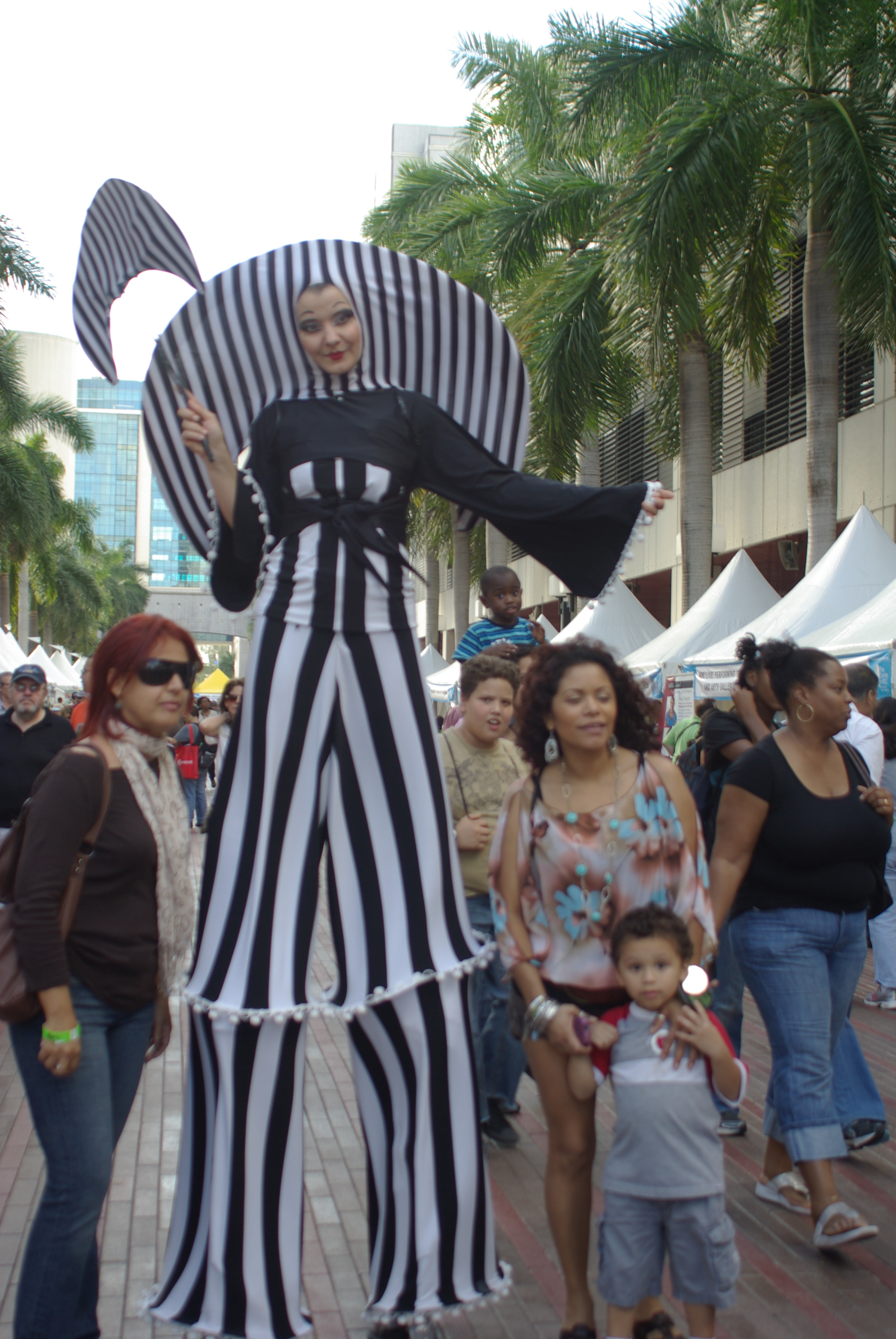
Street performers at the 2011 festival

The Miami Book Fair is an annual street fair and literary festival organized by Miami Dade College.

== History ==
Miami Book Fair International, originally known as "Books by the Bay," was founded in 1984 by Miami Dade College President Eduardo J. Padrón, Books & Books owner Mitchell Kaplan, Craig Pollock of BookWorks, and other local bookstore owners in cooperation with the Miami-Dade Public Library System. The primary organizers of the inaugural 1984 Book Fair from the Miami-Dade Public Library System were Head of Community Relations Margarita Cano and Wolfsonian campus librarian Juanita Johnson.

== Community partners and sponsors ==
The Florida Center for the Literary Arts (FCLA) is affiliated with the Miami Book Fair International. A permanent endowment for the FCLA was established with a grant from the John S. and James L. Knight Foundation. Full programming began in January 2002.

As a department of Miami Dade College, FCLA generates programs to support authors and writing, journalism, play and screen writing, reading and literacy, as well as the Miami Book Fair International. Outreach consists of reading campaigns and book discussions, writing workshops, author presentations, panel discussions, and master classes. The Center collaborates with Florida-based cultural institutions and other partners to advance literary initiatives.

== Events ==
=== Festival of Authors ===
Typically more than 300 authors from around the world participate in the Fair's international Festival of Authors. Writers come from across the United States and other countries including Argentina, Bosnia, Brazil, Canada, China, Cuba, Dominican Republic, England, France, Finland, Guatemala, Haiti, Hong Kong, Israel, Ireland, Jamaica, Mexico, Nicaragua, Philippines, Russia, South Africa, Spain, Taiwan, Trinidad, among others.

=== Evenings With... series ===
The "Evenings With... series" features readings by writers every evening for six consecutive festival days. Past guest authors have included recipients of the Nobel Prize in Literature, Pulitzer Prize, National Book Award, Casa de las Americas Prize, Pushcart Prize, O'Henry Award, National Magazine Award, Commonwealth Prize, MacArthur Fellowship, and Edgar Award.

=== Street fair ===
The three-day outdoor festival gathers hundreds of booksellers and exhibitors from major publishing houses, small presses, scholarly imprints, and foreign publishers. Sellers of used books, including signed first editions, original manuscripts, and other collectibles, also participate. Millions of books in multiple languages are available, along with book signings and musical entertainment, during the weekend Fair activity.

=== Comix Galaxy ===
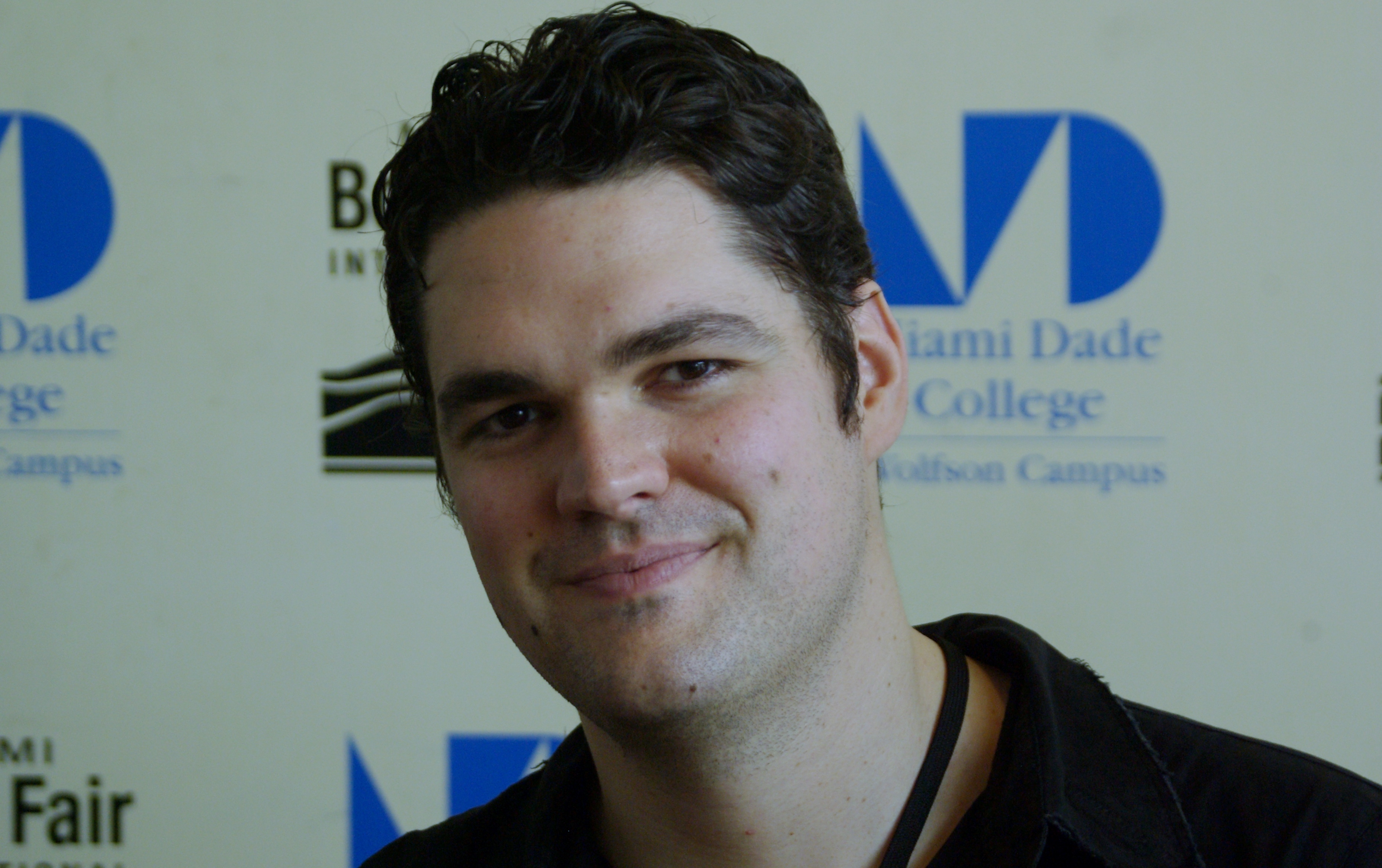
Jonathan Case at the Comic Galaxy Program, MBFI 2011

Comic Galaxy is a Fair program offering information on graphic novels and the comics world. It celebrates their place in United States literary life and their increasing popularity and integration into mainstream literature, culture, and education. The School of Comics, a prominent part of Comic Galaxy, is a day-long program with six sessions for teachers, librarians, parents, and others interested in the format, and special training for established comic book creators.

=== Children's Alley ===
Children's Alley, designed for young readers, features storytelling, puppets, theatrical performances, educational games, and hands-on activities. Generation Genius, a program within Children's Alley, hosts thousands of school-aged children annually. Miami Book Fair International also offers workshops and presentations to local teachers, librarians, and educators as part of Generation Genius. Programs are provided in cooperation with Miami Art Museum, HistoryMiami, Miami Children's Museum, Miami Science Museum, Early Learning Coalition of Miami Dade/Monroe, and Florida Blue.

=== Ibero-American Authors ===
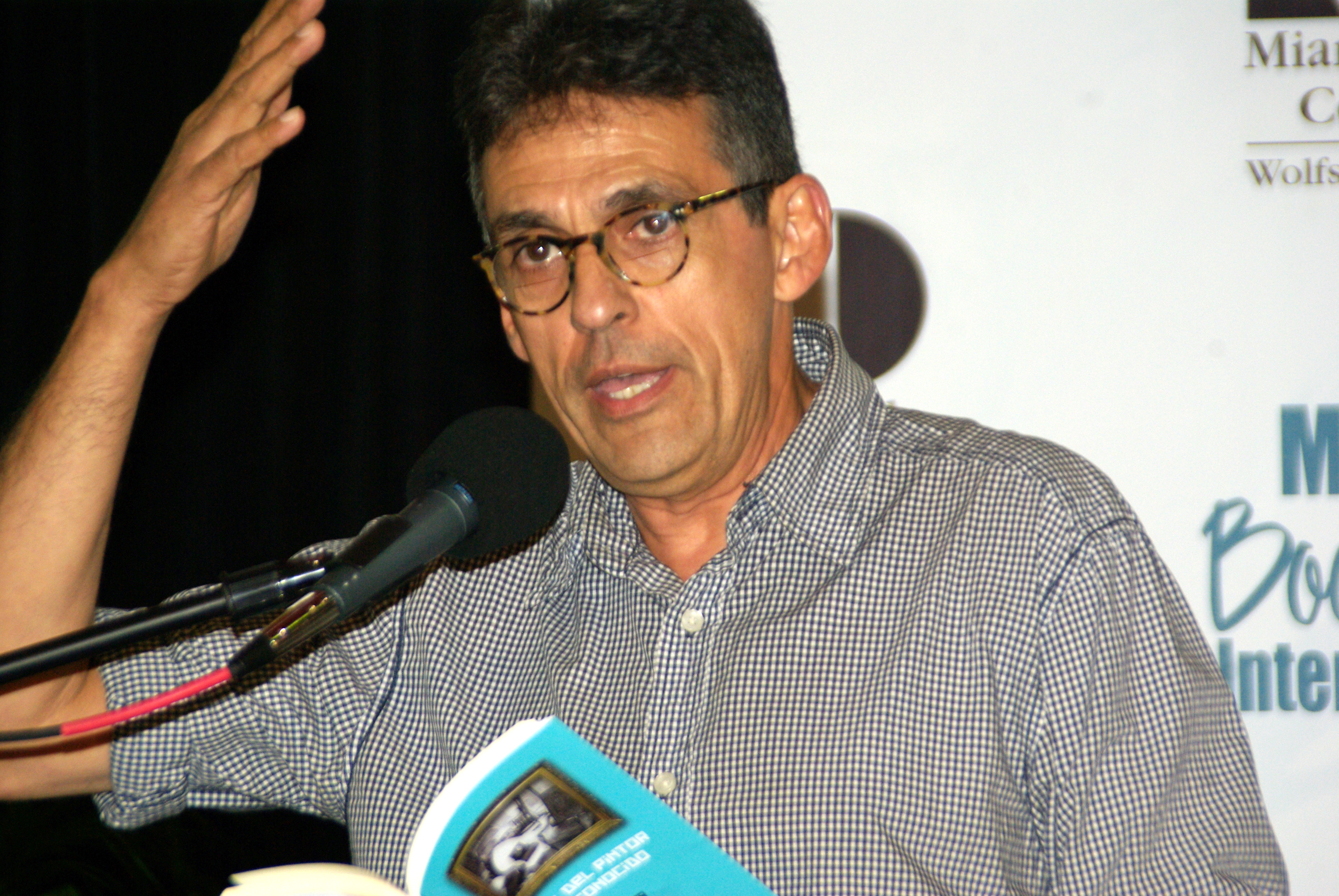
Cuban poet Néstor Díaz de Villegas at Spanish Language author program, MBFI 2011

Ibero-American Authors is Miami Book Fair International's Spanish and Portuguese language author program. More than 50 authors from various Latin American countries are featured during the eight days of the Fair. Readings take place nightly during the week and throughout the weekend.

=== Twilight Tastings and the Kitchen ===
Miami Book Fair International also includes hors d'oeuvre, complimentary cocktails, and nightly entertainment before weeknight author presentations. The Kitchen combines cooking demonstrations and author readings by featured cookbook authors and chefs as they recreate recipes from their books.

=== LGBTQIA+ topics ===
Authors writing on LGBTQIA+ topics are represented throughout the festival with titles in fiction, non-fiction, memoir, and erotica. Many featured authors are Lambda Award winners or finalists.

=== Miami Writer's Institute ===
Center for Literature and Theatre faculty, authors, and agents provide workshops related to fiction, nonfiction, poetry, and publishing. The center offers one and three-day workshops, with several taking place in Spanish.

== Recent highlights ==
=== 2014 ===
In 2014, the Miami Book Fair International partnered with the National Book Foundation to offer programming focused on 2014 National Book Award nominees and winners. Authors appearing at Miami Book Fair International 2014 included:

- Robert Baer
- Richard Blanco
- John Cleese
- Andy Cohen
- Michael DeForge
- Angela DiTerlizzi
- Tony DiTerlizzi
- Sheila E
- Grace Ellis
- Annabelle Gurwitch
- James W. Hall
- Ben Hatke
- Kazu Kibuishi
- Nicholas Kristof
- Norman Lear
- Brad Meltzer
- Lauren Miller
- Susan Minot
- George O'Connor
- Lauren Oliver
- Ann Patchett
- Eveline Pierre
- Ed Piskor
- Valerie Plame
- Questlove
- Anne Rice
- Tavis Smiley
- Raina Telgemeier
- John Waters
- Cornel West

=== 2013 ===
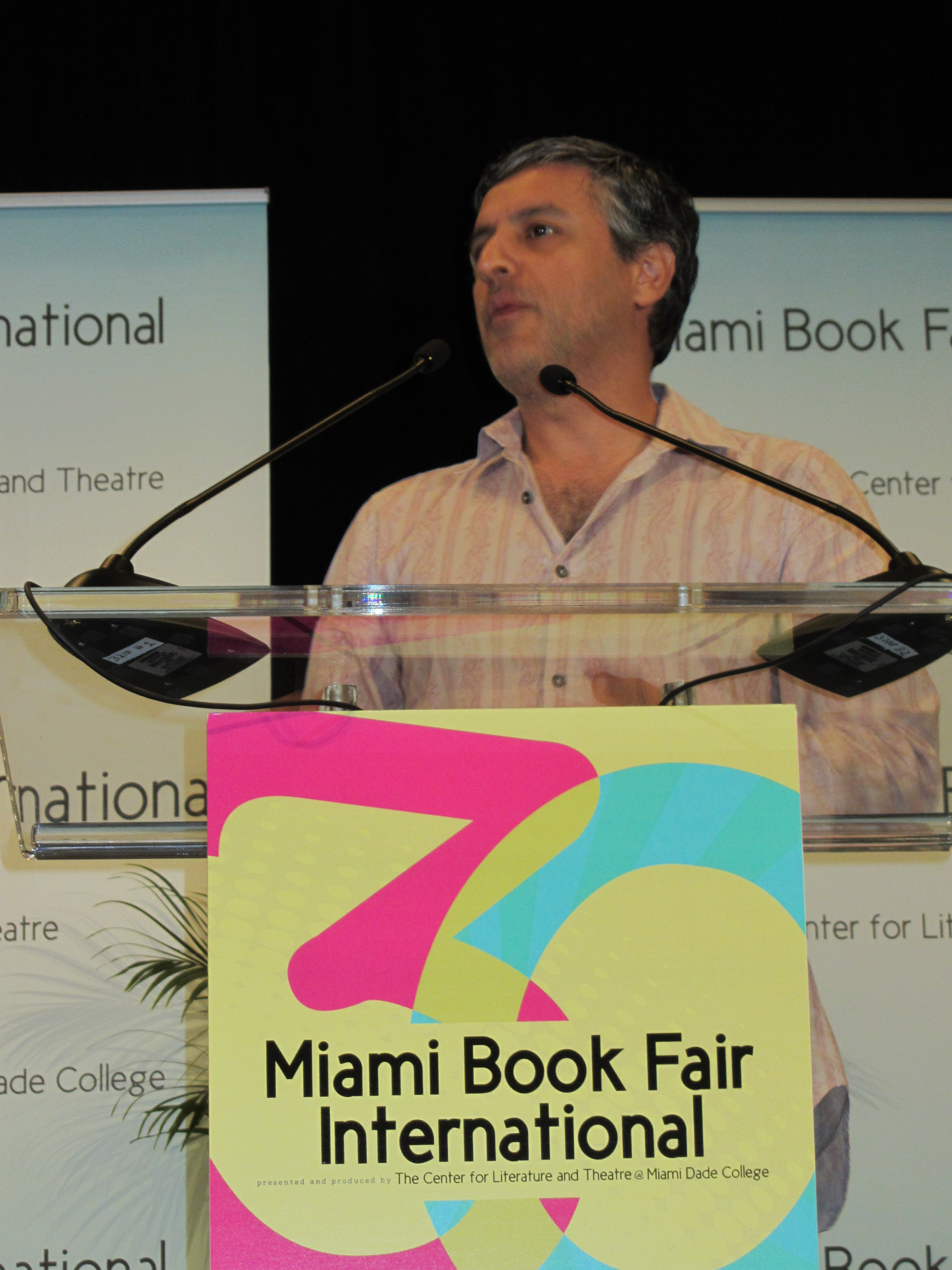
Reza Aslan at the MBFI 2013

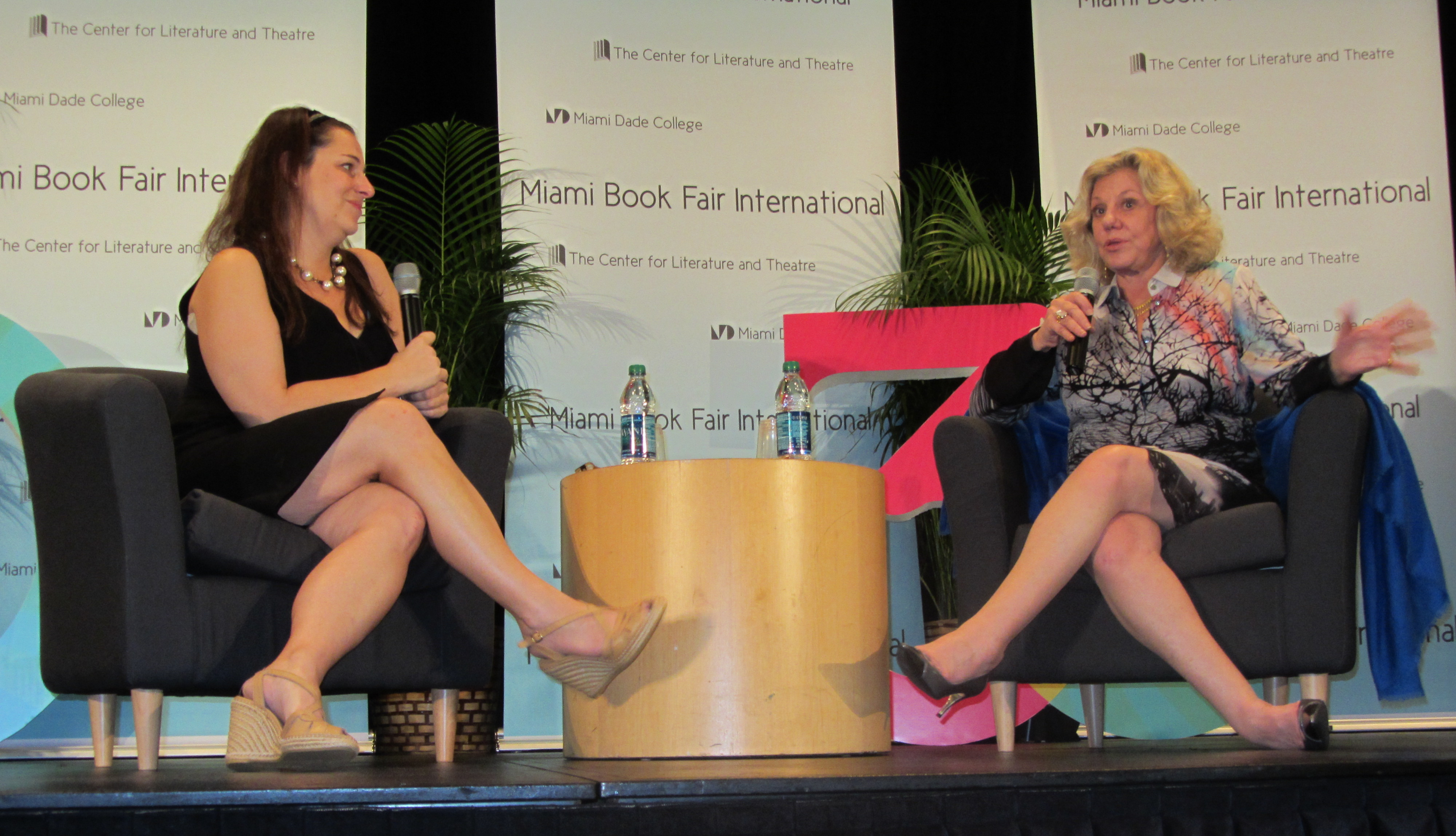
Jennifer Weiner and Erica Jong at the MBFI 2013

The 30th edition of the Fair celebrated the culture and literature of Spain. Authors appearing at Miami Book Fair International 2013 included:

- Jeff Abbott
- Mitch Albom
- Reza Aslan
- Paul Auster
- Holly Black
- Stanley Crouch
- Kwame Dawes
- Delia Ephron
- Ana Fuentes
- Nikki Giovanni
- Doris Kearns Goodwin
- Dr. Carl Hart
- John Heilemann
- Anjelica Huston
- Andrew Kaufman
- Gordon Korman
- Diane Ladd
- Wally Lamb
- Adam Mansbach
- Chris Matthews
- D.T. Max
- Terry McMillan
- Brad Meltzer
- David N. Meyer
- Jacquelyn Mitchard

=== 2012 ===
The featured country of 2012's Miami Book Fair International was Paraguay. Paraguayan culture was showcased through film, dance, and fine and folkloric arts.

Authors at Miami Book Fair International 2012 included:

- Martin Amis
- Nate Berkus
- Justin Cronin
- Aline Crumb
- Junot Díaz
- Emma Donoghue
- Tim Dorsey
- Andre Dubus III
- Carolina Garcia-Aguilera
- Chris Hayes
- Mark Helprin
- Jamal Joseph
- Daniel Kirk
- Anne Lamott
- Jessica Martinez
- Andrew McCarthy
- Diana McCaulay
- Bill O'Reilly
- Christopher Pike
- Lemony Snicket
- Jake Tapper
- Jeffrey Toobin
- Irvine Welsh
- Sherri Winston
- Tom Wolfe

=== 2011 ===
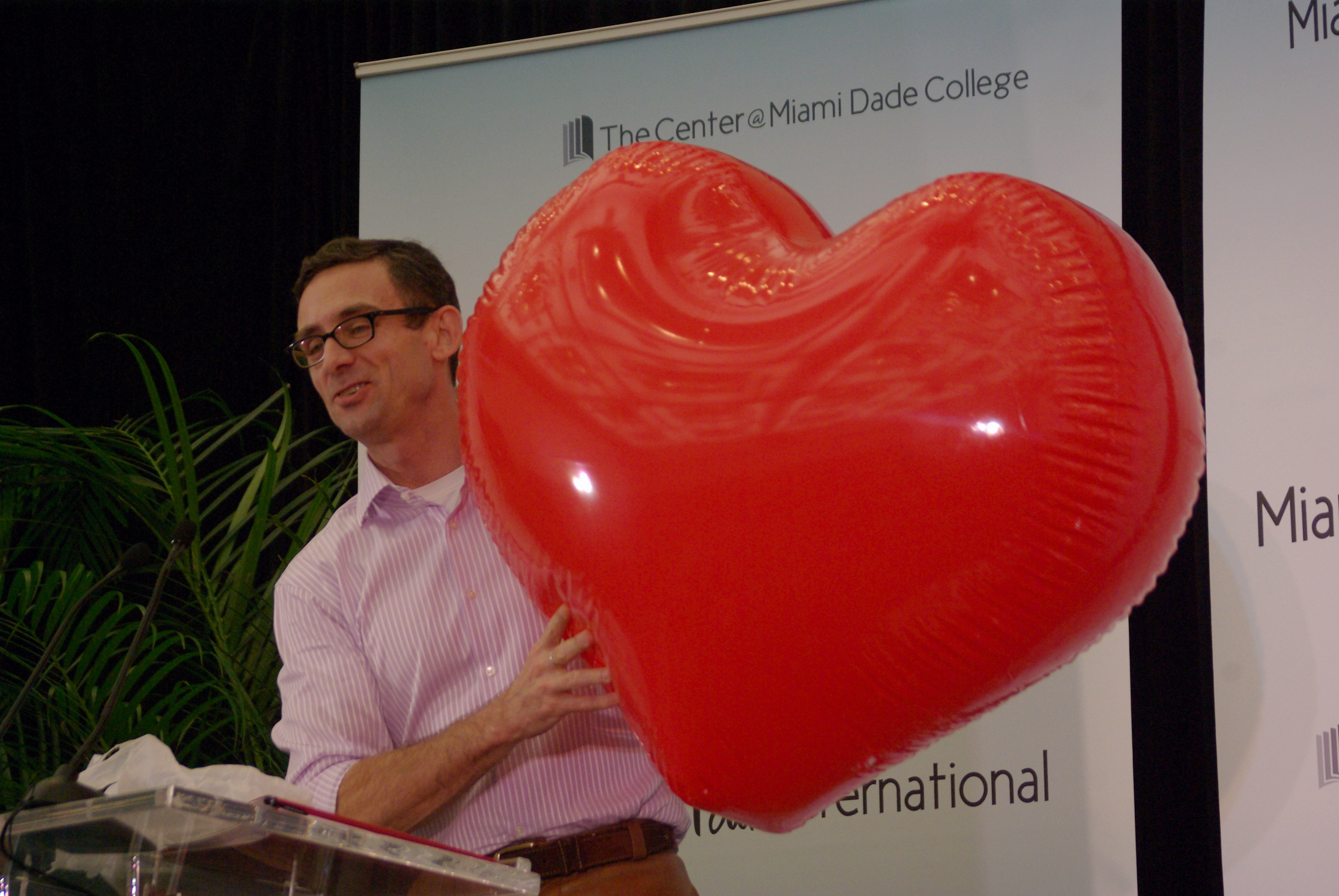
Chuck Palahniuk at the MBFI 2011

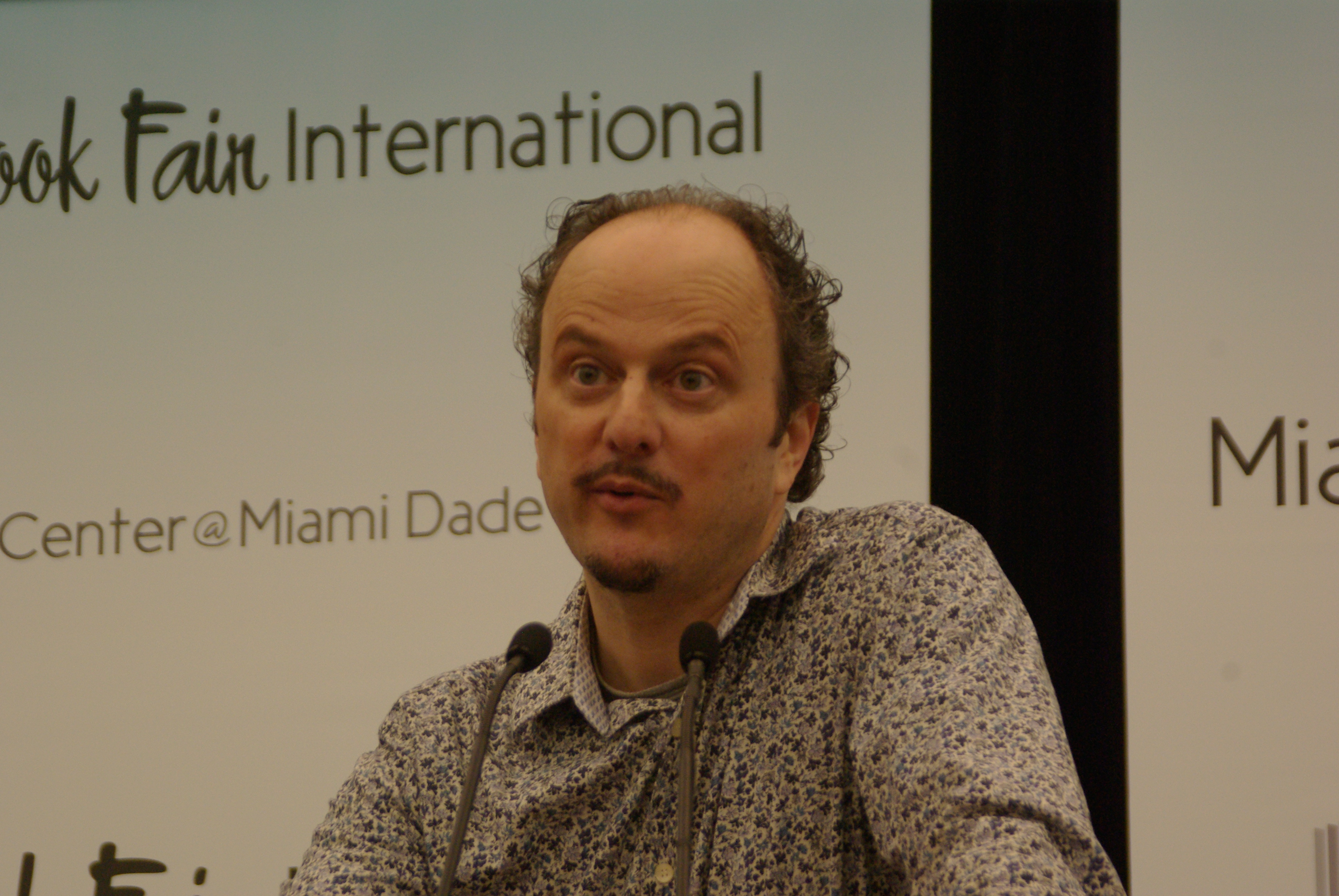
Jeffrey Eugenides at the MBFI 2011

Miami Book Fair International 2011 included demonstrations of Chinese culture and art and discussions of social issues facing contemporary China. An international symposium on Chinese language, culture, and communication was also held.

Authors participating in Miami Book Fair International 2011 included:

- Dr. Arthur Agatston
- Tom Angleberger
- David Brooks
- Dan Clowes
- John Connolly
- Bob Edwards
- Jeffrey Eugenides
- Cristina García
- Dr. Paul George
- Lev Grossman
- Sandra Gutierrez
- Ellen Hopkins
- Jeff Kinney
- Megan McDonald
- Michael Moore
- Néstor Díaz de Villegas
- Elizabeth Nunez
- Susan Orlean
- Chuck Palahniuk
- Christopher Paolini
- Karen Russell
- Esmeralda Santiago
- Jon Scieszka
- Touré
- Calvin Trillin
- Belle Yang

=== 2010 ===
The fair dedicated its international space to Mexico, in celebration of the bicentennial of the nation's independence and the centennial of its 1910 revolution. Events included author presentations and roundtables, ballet performances, art and photography exhibitions, a movie series, and theater performances.

Authors participating in Miami Book Fair International 2010 included:

- Maha Akhtar
- Kim Anthony
- Dan Archer
- Ann Beattie
- Susanna Daniel
- Edwidge Danticat
- Kate DiCamillo
- Tony DiTerlizzi
- Dave Eggers
- Jonathan Franzen
- Willie Geist
- James W. Hall
- Vicki Hendricks
- Sebastian Junger
- Chip Kidd
- Hari Kunzru
- Meghan McCain
- Ben Mezrich
- Walter Mosley
- Beatriz Rivera
- Scott Turow
- Lisa Unger
- Judith Viorst
- Scott Westerfeld
- Simon Winchester

=== 2009 ===
Environmental issues were a focus of Miami Book Fair International 2009. The college used native plants on stages and entrances, and later planted them in the community. A bike valet parking service was available, and recycling programs were promoted.

Authors appearing at Miami Book Fair International 2009 included:

- Sherman Alexie
- Lidia Bastianich
- Edna Buchanan
- Meg Cabot
- Susie Essman
- Dan Goldman
- Al Gore
- Senator Bob Graham
- Heather Graham
- James Grippando
- Dr. Sanjay Gupta
- John Hodgman
- Gwen Ifill
- Sid Jacobson
- Wally Lamb
- Peter Lerangis
- Jonathan Lethem
- Tao Lin
- Jeff Lindsay
- Ralph Nader
- Joyce Carol Oates
- Iggy Pop
- Luis Alberto Urrea
- Larry Wilmore

== See also ==
- Florida literature
- Books in the United States
