= Neil S. Plakcy =

American writer

Neil S. Plakcy is an American writer whose works range from mystery to romance to anthologies and collections of gay erotica. Plakcy is a retired Professor of English at Broward College.

== Education ==
Plakcy studied creative writing at the University of Pennsylvania with Philip Roth and Carlos Fuentes. He went on to graduate from Columbia University's graduate school of business with an MBA in real estate and operations management.

While working as a producer for a computer game company in South Florida, Plakcy studied for his MFA degree in creative writing at Florida International University. He graduated in 1992, as a member of the university's first class to receive that degree. His instructors were Lynne Barrett, James W. Hall and Les Standiford, and his classmates included Vicki Hendricks, Christine Kling, Dennis Lehane and Barbara Parker. His thesis was a comic novel about Jewish family relationships and shopping mall construction, Invasion of the Blatnicks.

== Publishing career ==
Plakcy began his professional publishing career with the first of his Hawaiian mysteries, Mahu, acquired and edited for Haworth Press by mystery author Greg Herren. With the second book in the series, Mahu Surfer, Plakcy moved to Alyson Books, which continued the series with Mahu Fire and Mahu Vice, and published their own edition of Mahu in 2009. After the close of Alyson, MLR Books picked up the series, publishing new editions of the first three and then continuing the series.

Plakcy and long-time friend Sharon Sakson co-edited a collection of stories by gay men about their experiences with their dogs, entitled Paws and Reflect: A Special Bond Between Man and Dog. A frequent contributor to gay anthologies, Plakcy has also edited numerous collections of gay erotica.

With the publication of GayLife.com in 2009, Plakcy entered the M/M romance genre, basing the book on his own experiences in software and web development and his familiarity with Miami Beach.

Plakcy has been a finalist for the Lambda Literary Award three times: twice in gay mystery, and once in gay romance. He won the "Hawaii Five-O" award given by attendees at the Left Coast Crime fan conference and his work has been enthusiastically reviewed by mainstream and specialty publications as well as by many fans. He has twice been a finalist for the Lambda Literary Award for Best Gay Men's Mystery Novel.

=== Mahu Investigations ===
- Mahu (2005 Haworth Press) (2009 Alyson Books) (2011 MLR Press)
- Mahu Surfer (2007 Alyson Books) (2011 MLR Press)
- Mahu Fire (2008 Alyson Books) (2011 MLR Press)
- Mahu Vice (2009 Alyson Books) (2011 MLR Press)
- Mahu Men (2010 MLR Press) - collection of mystery & erotic stories
- Mahu Blood (2011 MLR Press)
- Zero Break: A Mahu Investigation (2012 MLR Press)
- Natural Predators: A Mahu Investigation (2013 MLR Press)
- Accidental Contact and Other Mahu Investigations (2014 MLR Press)
- Children of Noah: A Mahu Investigation (2015 MLR Press)

=== Golden Retriever Mysteries ===
- In Dog We Trust (Amazon KDP & Create Space, 2010)
- The Kingdom of Dog (Amazon KDP & Create Space, 2011)
- Dog Helps Those (Amazon KDP & Create Space, 2012)
- Dog Bless You (Amazon KDP & Create Space, 2013)
- Whom Dog Hath Joined (Amazon KDP & Create Space, 2014)
- Dog Have Mercy (Amazon KDP & Create Space, 2015)
- Honest to Dog (Amazon KDP & CreateSpace, 2016)
- Dog is in the Details (Amazon KDP & CreateSpace, 2017)

The Golden Retriever Mysteries are also available as audio books.

=== Have Body, Will Guard Adventure/Romance Series ===
- Three Wrong Turns in the Desert (Loose Id, 2009)
- Dancing with the Tide (Loose Id, 2010)
- Teach Me Tonight (Loose Id, 2012)
- Olives for the Stranger (Loose Id, 2012)
- Under the Waterfall (Loose Id, 2013)
- The Noblest Vengeance (Loose Id, 2015)
- Finding Freddie Venus (Loose Id, 2015)
- A Cold Wind (Loose Id, 2016)

=== Love On Romance Series ===
- Love on Site (Loose Id, 2013)
- Love on Stage (Loose Id, 2014)
- Love on the Web (Loose Id, 2015)
- Love on the Pitch (Loose Id, 2015)

=== Other M/M Romances ===
- GayLife.com (MLR Press, 2009)
- The Guardian Angel of South Beach (Loose Id, 2011)
- The Russian Boy (Amazon, 2011)
- Mi Amor (Loose Id, 2011)
- The Sea Between us (Loose Id, 2015) (a continuation of Mi Amor
- The Buchanan Letters (MLR Press, 2012)

=== Non-Series Fiction ===
- Invasion of the Blatnicks (Amazon KDP & Create Space, 2010)
- The Outhouse Gang (Untreed Reads, 2010)
- Soul Kiss (Amazon KDP & Create Space, 2011) (Young Adult)
- The Cat Who Got Married (Amazon KDP, 2011) (M/F romance stories)

=== Anthologies Edited ===
- Paws and Reflect: A Special Bond Between Man and Dog (Alyson Books 2007 hardcover, 2008 trade paper) Amazon KDP 2012
- Hard Hats (Cleis Press, 2008)
- Surfer Boys (Cleis Press, 2009)
- Skater Boys (Cleis Press, 2010)
- The Handsome Prince (Cleis Press, 2011)
- Model Men (Cleis Press, 2011)
- Sexy Sailors (Cleis Press, 2012)
- Beach Bums (Cleis Press, 2013)
- Active Duty (Cleis Press, 2014)
- Take This Man (Cleis Press, 2015)

=== Other ===
- The Next One Will Kill You: An Angus Green Novel (Diversion Books, 2016)
