= Spill =

A spill occurs when the contents of something, usually in liquid form, are emptied out onto a surface, person or clothes, often unintentionally.

Spill may also refer to:

- Oil spill
- Chemical spill
- Data spill
- Leadership spill
- Spill (audio), where audio from one source is picked up by a microphone intended for a different source
- Variable spilling, a side effect of register allocation
- Thin sticks of wood or tightly rolled paper tapers, used for transferring fire, and stored in a spill vase
- SPILL – an acronym for St Pancras International Low Level, the Thameslink platforms at St Pancras railway station in London

== As a proper name ==
- Thomas Spilsbury, soccer player nicknamed Spill
- Spill (band), a British dance duo
- Spill.com, a movie review website

=== People with the surname ===
- Daniel Spill (1832–1887), English entrepreneur
- Steve Spill (born 1955), American magician

== Arts ==
- Spill (book), a 1991 novel by Les Standiford
- Spill. En damroman, a 2010 Swedish novel by Sigrid Combüchen
- Spill: Scenes of Black Feminist Fugitivity, a 2017 book of prose and poetry by Alexis Pauline Gumbs
- "Spill" (Beavis and Butt-head), a 2011 episode
- Spilled!, a 2025 cozy game

== See also ==
- Spillway – Structure for controlled release of flows from a dam or levee
- Spilling water for luck – Eurasiatic folk custom
- Spilling salt – Evil omen in European superstition
