= Les Standiford =

American novelist

Les Standiford is an author and, since 1985, the Founding Director of the Florida International University Creative Writing Program in Miami, Florida. He also holds the Peter Meinke Chair in Creative Writing at Eckerd College in St. Petersburg, Florida (named for Peter Meinke). His most recent books have been narrative non-fiction historical works. His novels featuring the character "John Deal" put him in the Miami School of crime fiction, whose progenitors are Charles Willeford and John D. MacDonald, and which includes Elmore Leonard, Jeff Lindsay, Carl Hiaasen, James W. Hall, Paul Levine, Edna Buchanan, and Barbara Parker.

Standiford's students have included novelists Dennis Lehane, Barbara Parker, Vicki Hendricks, Ginny Rorby, and Neil Plakcy. According to Publishers Weekly, in 1976, while he was the chairman of the Creative Writing Program at the University of Texas El Paso, "Standiford gave Raymond Carver his first job ... when Carver was recovering from his infamous alcoholic crash and burn."

== Education ==
Standiford attended the Air Force Academy and the Columbia University School of Law, and holds a B.A. in psychology from Muskingum College in Ohio and M.A. and Ph.D. degrees in Literature and Creative Writing from the University of Utah. He is a former screenwriting fellow and graduate of the American Film Institute in Los Angeles."

== Awards and associations ==
According to the biography on his website, Standiford has been awarded the Barnes & Noble Discover Great New Writers Award, the Frank O'Connor Award for Short Fiction, a Florida Individual Artist Fellowship in Fiction, and a National Endowment for the Arts Fellowship in Fiction. He is a member of the Associated Writing Programs, Mystery Writers of America, and the Writers Guild of America.

== Personal life ==
Standiford's wife, Kimberly Kurzweil-Standiford, is a psychotherapist and artist. They live in Pinecrest, Florida, and have three children.

== Works ==
=== Historical narrative non-fiction ===
- Coral Gables, The City Beautiful Story (1998)
- ''Opening Day: Or, the Return of Satchel Paige (2001)
- Last Train to Paradise: Henry Flagler and the Spectacular Rise and Fall of the Railroad that Crossed an Ocean. (2003)
- Meet You in Hell: Andrew Carnegie, Henry Clay Frick, and the Bitter Partnership That Transformed America. (2005)
- The Man Who Invented Christmas: How Charles Dickens's A Christmas Carol Rescued His Career and Revived Our Holiday Spirits. (2008) This was turned into a movie in 2017.
- Washington Burning: How a Frenchman's Vision for Our Nation's Capital Survived Congress, the Founding Fathers, and the Invading British Army. (2008)
- Bringing Adam Home: The Abduction that Changed America., with Joe Matthews (2011)
- Water to the Angels: William Mulholland, His Monumental Aqueduct, and the Rise of Los Angeles (2015)
- Palm Beach, Mar-A-Lago, and the Rise of America's Xanadu (2019)

=== Novels ===
John Deal Miami crime novels

- Done Deal (1993)
- Raw Deal (1994)
- Deal to Die For (1995)
- Deal on Ice (1997)
- Presidential Deal (1998)
- Black Mountain (2000)
- Deal With the Dead (2001)
- Bone Key (2002)
- Havana Run (2003)

Other novels

- Spill (1991)

=== Screenplays ===
- Bones of Coral, written with James W. Hall, based on Hall's novel, purchased ny MGM-Pathé, but never produced
- Virus (1996) based on Standiford's 1991 novel Spill, starring Brian Bosworth directed by Allan A. Goldstein, shown on Showtime after its theatrical release

=== Short stories and articles ===
According to the biography on his website, "Standiford's short stories and articles have appeared in a number of magazines and anthologies, including Kansas Quarterly, Writer's Digest, Fodor's Guide, Smoke Magazine, the Key West Reader, Confrontation, Three American Literatures (Modern Language Association), Perfect Lies: A Century of Classic Golf Fiction, and Communion: Contemporary Fiction Writers Reread the Bible. He has been a regular reviewer for The Miami Herald, Chicago Tribune, New York Newsday, and the New York Daily News."

=== Other ===
- Miami, City of Dreams (1997) text for photo collection by Alan S. Maltz
- Naked Came The Manatee (1998) contributor to collective novel, with Dave Barry, Edna Buchanan, Elmore Leonard, others.
- The Putt At The End of The World (2000) collective novel, contributing editor, with Dave Barry, James W. Hall, others
- Miami Noir (2006) editor, short story collection
