= Mick Parsons =

American poet (born 1973)

Mick Parsons (born 1973) is an American poet, novelist, short story writer, essayist, and journalist. He is the author of six books. Three of them are Dead Machine E/Ditions: In The Great World (small) (his first novel),Conversations with Carlo (a collection of poetry), and The Greyhound Quarto (a small piece of non-fiction). The other three: Living Broke: Short Stories, and two collections of poetry, Lines from Another Book of Common Prayer and Fragments of Unidentifiable Form were published by Publish America. His work has been featured on semantikon.com and has appeared in The Dispatch Litareview, The American Mythville Review, The Smoking Poet, and Antique Children.

These days he is traveling America on the cheap and writing about it at americanrevisionary.com.

He has been a teacher, a factory worker, a file clerk, a small press publisher (The One Legged Cow Press), a freelance journalist, and a lifelong layabout.

== Works ==
=== Fiction ===
==== In The Great World (small) (2010) ====
This debut novel, published exclusively as an e-book, is written in a series of interconnected episodes. Written in first person from the point of view of an unnamed young man in his mid-20s, the novel is an exploration of the American Dream in the 21st. The narrator is unapologetic, rude, lazy, occasionally noble, generally a coward, and always his own worst enemy. He’s somehow managed to create a comfortable – if shaky – bubble of comfort in Phoenix after being displaced by Hurricane Katrina. He lives in a cheap motel; he hangs out at the MTP Sports Bar and Grill – when he has money – and drinks in his room when he doesn’t. He scrapes by on day labor and a short-term work ethic. He’s got no interest in regular work, going back to college, doing anything, or maintaining a relationship.

Through him we meet other people who are just as broken, though less aware of their situation, and we view the world the narrator lives in: a post 9/11 two-dimensional world without morality or ethics, where people get screwed over whether they do the right thing or not; a world of drug dealers, abused wives, manipulated boy toys, bookies, hookers, crooked cops, and a cocaine-addled bar owner. All of them are, like the narrator, just looking for some kind of shaky comfort in the world; and, just like the narrator, unable to find it.

==== Living Broke: Short Stories (2010) ====
These stories are a collection of darkly humorous, visceral, and honest images of life in America since the turn of the century. The characters are all trying to survive and get by in spite of living in a world where there is never enough, where hard work is not rewarded the way we are always told it will be, and where the divisions between the Haves and Have Nots are increasingly obvious. These are the In-Between People - the people who believed in the Middle Class American Dream and who have found it failing, but have nothing tangible to replace it with. The victories expressed are small and short lived, while the overarching machinations - institution, ambition, greed, loneliness, and isolation - are constants.

=== Poetry ===
==== Conversation With Carlo (2010) ====
These poems, written over the first year or so of his time in Arizona and published exclusively as an e-book, are at once sad, funny, geographic, and myopic. But like all good poetry, they work to move themselves and the reader outside themselves and into a larger conversation in which words may be the most overrated commodity.

==== Lines From Another Book of Common Prayer (2007) ====
The poems in this second collection, published by POD publisher Publish America, explore the interior landscapes of the spiritual, the spectacular, and the everyday cityscapes and countryside that make us who we are, and from which we are ultimately unable to really escape. For Parsons, the only option is acceptance and the hope that transcendence is still possible in this day and age.

==== Fragments of Unidentifiable Form (2006) ====
In this, his first published collection of poems, Parsons ties the internal geography of everyday life with the machinations of the outside world. By exploring the connections between these two seemingly isolated landscapes, the poems in this collection seek to outline a new geography—another continent to explore in a world that seems to be depleted, overworked, and left behind.

=== Non-fiction/essays ===
==== The Greyhound Quarto(2010) ====
Describe as "travel writing for the real life traveler," Parsons describes traveling across the United States on a Greyhound bus, aiming to "talk about traveling the way you don't get it on the Travel Channel." It is a four-piece essay that attempts to bring parts of America into focus that most people don't see.
