= 32nd Golden Raspberry Awards =

Award ceremony presented by the Golden Raspberry Award Foundation in 2011

- Date: April 1, 2012
- Site: Magicopolis, Santa Monica, California

Highlights
- Worst Picture: Jack and Jill
- Most awards: Jack and Jill (10)
- Most nominations: Jack and Jill (12)

The 32nd Golden Raspberry Awards, or Razzies, ceremony was held on April 1, 2012, at Magicopolis in Santa Monica, California to identify the worst films the film industry had to offer in 2011, according to votes from members of the Golden Raspberry Foundation. Razzies co-founder John J. B. Wilson has stated that the intent of the awards is "to be funny." The nominations were announced on February 25, 2012. Taking a break from Razzie tradition of announcing both the nominees and winners before the Academy Awards functions by one day, it was decided in January 2012 to delay both the Razzie nomination announcements and ceremony by several weeks in order for the actual Razzie ceremony to be held on April Fools' Day. The actual nominations however, still had some connection to the Oscars ceremony, as they were announced the night before the Academy Awards were held.

Adam Sandler received a Razzie record six nominations as an individual and a total of twenty-three nominations for films he was involved with.

Voting for Worst Screen Ensemble was not just determined by members of the Golden Raspberry Award Foundation. Voting for the award was opened up to the general public online and conducted by the website Rotten Tomatoes. A grand total of 35,117 votes were cast.

Jack and Jill was nominated for twelve awards (including twice each in Worst Supporting Actor and Worst Supporting Actress) and won in every category. This was the first time in the history of the Razzies that one film won every award. The film also holds the record for most Razzie wins (beating Battlefield Earth) and most wins in a single year (beating I Know Who Killed Me). The only other film to win was another Happy Madison film Just Go with It, with only two Razzies earned for Worst Director and Worst Actor.

== Winners and nominees ==
Winner (in bold)

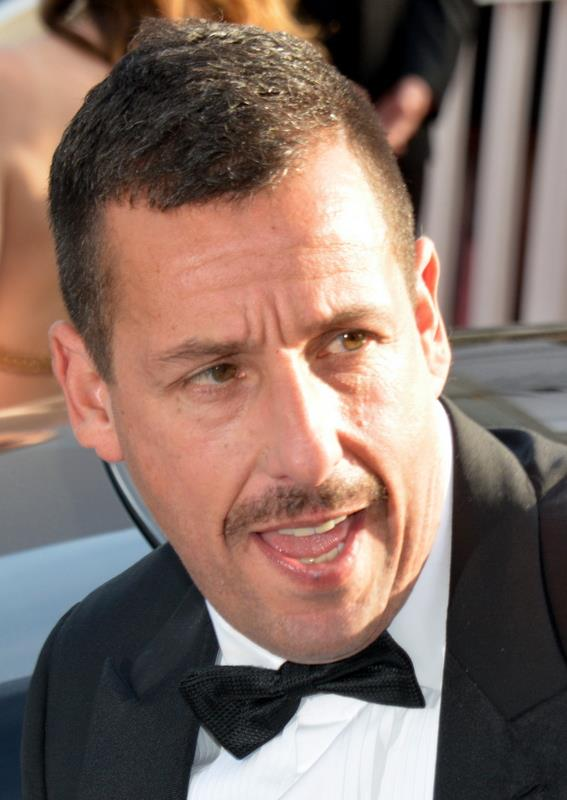
Adam Sandler, Worst Actor and Worst Actress winner; Worst Screen Couple and Worst Screenplay co-winner

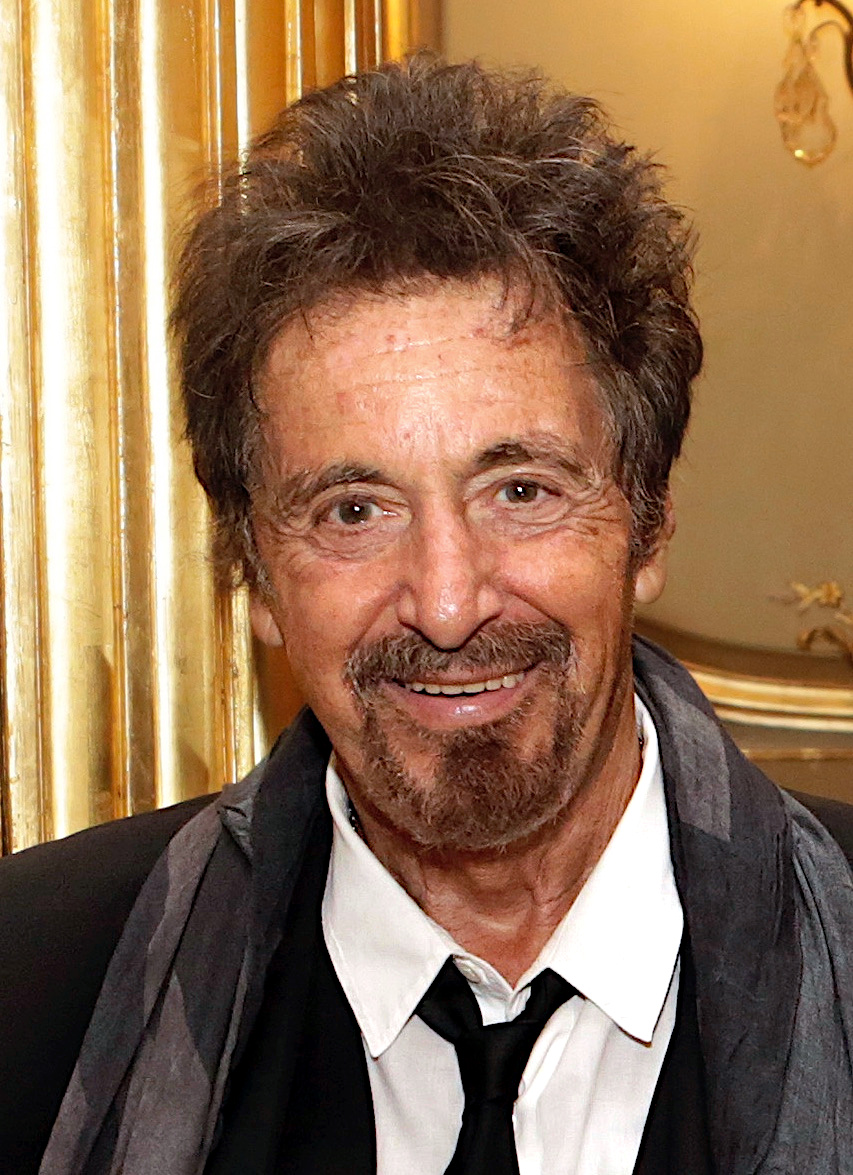
Al Pacino, Worst Supporting Actor winner and Worst Screen Couple co-winner

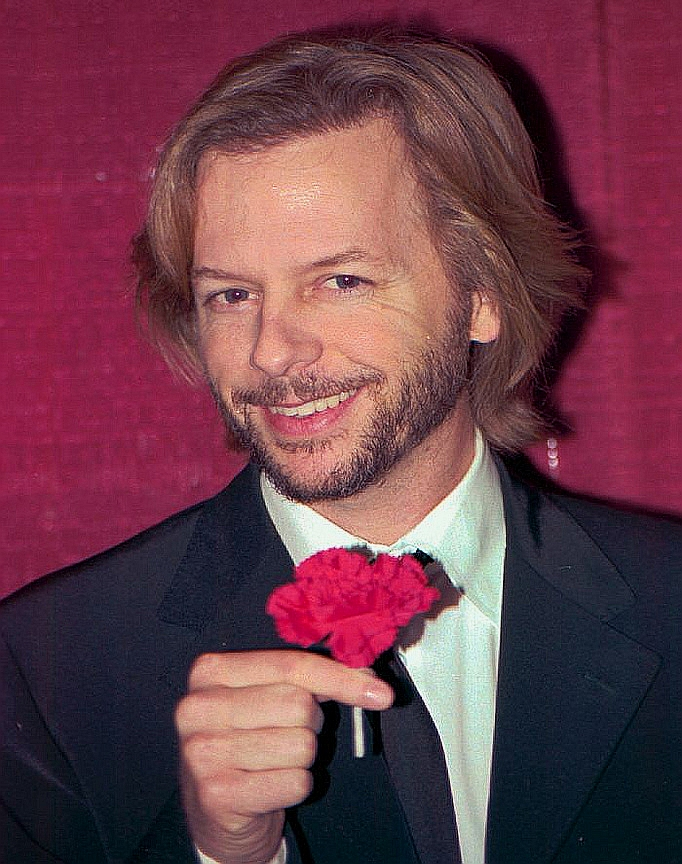
David Spade, Worst Supporting Actress winner

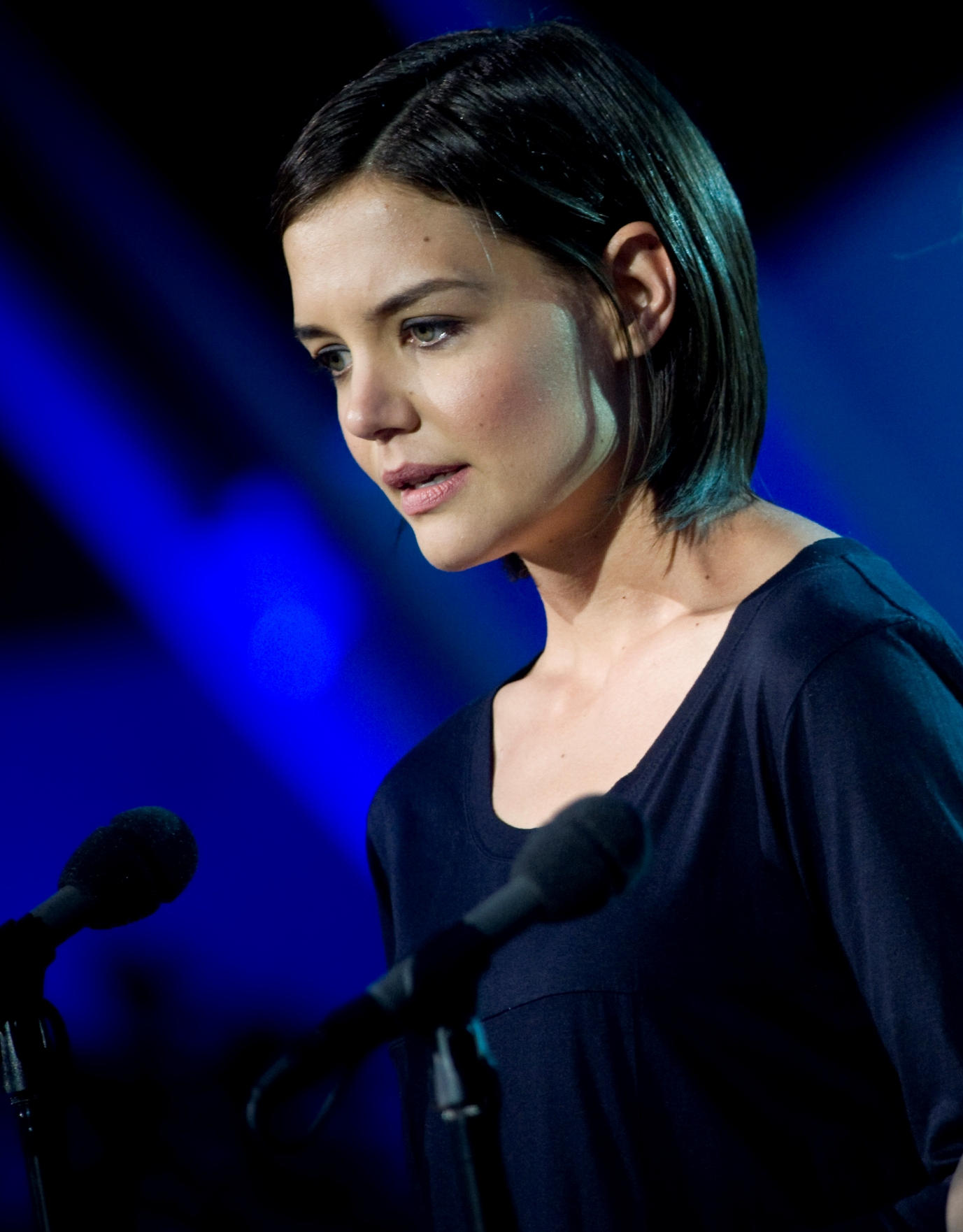
Katie Holmes, Worst Screen Couple co-winner

Category	Recipient
Worst Picture	**Jack and Jill (Columbia)**
Worst Picture	Bucky Larson: Born to Be a Star (Columbia)
Worst Picture	New Year's Eve (New Line Cinema)
Worst Picture	Transformers: Dark of the Moon (Paramount)
Worst Picture	The Twilight Saga: Breaking Dawn – Part 1 (Summit)
Worst Actor	**Adam Sandler in Jack and Jill and Just Go with It as Jack Sadelstein and Dr. Danny Maccabee (respectively)**
Worst Actor	Russell Brand in Arthur as Arthur Bach
Worst Actor	Nicolas Cage in Drive Angry, Season of the Witch, and Trespass as Milton, Behmen von Bleibruck, and Kyle Miller (respectively)
Worst Actor	Taylor Lautner in Abduction and The Twilight Saga: Breaking Dawn – Part 1 as Nathan Harper and Jacob Black (respectively)
Worst Actor	Nick Swardson in Bucky Larson: Born to Be a Star as Bucky Larson
Worst Actress	**Adam Sandler (in drag) in Jack and Jill as Jill Sadelstein**
Worst Actress	Martin Lawrence (in drag) in Big Mommas: Like Father, Like Son as Big Momma
Worst Actress	Sarah Palin (as herself) in The Undefeated
Worst Actress	Sarah Jessica Parker in I Don't Know How She Does It and New Year’s Eve as Kate Reddy and Kim Doyle (respectively)
Worst Actress	Kristen Stewart in The Twilight Saga: Breaking Dawn – Part 1 as Bella Swan
Worst Supporting Actor	**Al Pacino (as himself) in Jack and Jill**
Worst Supporting Actor	Patrick Dempsey in Transformers: Dark of the Moon as Dylan Gould
Worst Supporting Actor	James Franco in Your Highness as Prince Fabious
Worst Supporting Actor	Ken Jeong in Big Mommas: Like Father, Like Son, The Hangover Part II, Transformers: Dark of the Moon, and Zookeeper as Mailman, Leslie Chow, Jerry "Deep" Wang, and Venom (respectively)
Worst Supporting Actor	Nick Swardson in Jack and Jill and Just Go with It as Todd and Eddie Simms (respectively)
Worst Supporting Actress	**David Spade (in drag) in Jack and Jill as Monica**
Worst Supporting Actress	Katie Holmes in Jack and Jill as Erin Sadelstein
Worst Supporting Actress	Rosie Huntington-Whiteley in Transformers: Dark of the Moon as Carly Spencer
Worst Supporting Actress	Brandon T. Jackson (in drag) in Big Mommas: Like Father, Like Son as Charmaine
Worst Supporting Actress	Nicole Kidman in Just Go with It as Devlin Adams
Worst Screen Couple	**Adam Sandler and either Katie Holmes, Al Pacino, or himself (in drag) – Jack and Jill**
Worst Screen Couple	Nicolas Cage and anyone sharing the screen with him in any of his three 2011 movies (Drive Angry, Season of the Witch, and Trespass)
Worst Screen Couple	Shia LaBeouf and Rosie Huntington-Whiteley – Transformers: Dark of the Moon
Worst Screen Couple	Adam Sandler and either Jennifer Aniston or Brooklyn Decker – Just Go with It
Worst Screen Couple	Kristen Stewart and either Taylor Lautner or Robert Pattinson – The Twilight Saga: Breaking Dawn – Part 1
Worst Prequel, Remake, Rip-off or Sequel	**Jack and Jill (Rip-off/Remake of Glen or Glenda) (Columbia)**
Worst Prequel, Remake, Rip-off or Sequel	Arthur (Warner Bros.)
Worst Prequel, Remake, Rip-off or Sequel	Bucky Larson: Born to Be a Star (Rip-off of Boogie Nights and A Star Is Born) (Columbia)
Worst Prequel, Remake, Rip-off or Sequel	The Hangover Part II (Warner Bros.)
Worst Prequel, Remake, Rip-off or Sequel	The Twilight Saga: Breaking Dawn – Part 1 (Summit)
Worst Director	**Dennis Dugan for Jack and Jill and Just Go with It**
Worst Director	Michael Bay for Transformers: Dark of the Moon
Worst Director	Tom Brady for Bucky Larson: Born to Be a Star
Worst Director	Bill Condon for The Twilight Saga: Breaking Dawn – Part 1
Worst Director	Garry Marshall for New Year's Eve
Worst Screenplay	**Jack and Jill (screenplay by Adam Sandler and Steve Koren, story by Ben Zook)**
Worst Screenplay	Bucky Larson: Born to Be a Star (written by Adam Sandler, Allen Covert, & Nick Swardson)
Worst Screenplay	New Year's Eve (written by Katherine Fugate)
Worst Screenplay	Transformers: Dark of the Moon (screenplay by Ehren Kruger, based on the toy line by Hasbro)
Worst Screenplay	The Twilight Saga: Breaking Dawn – Part 1 (screenplay by Melissa Rosenberg, based on the novel by Stephenie Meyer)
Worst Screen Ensemble	**The entire cast of Jack and Jill**
Worst Screen Ensemble	The entire cast of Bucky Larson: Born to Be a Star
Worst Screen Ensemble	The entire cast of New Year's Eve
Worst Screen Ensemble	The entire cast of Transformers: Dark of the Moon
Worst Screen Ensemble	The entire cast of The Twilight Saga: Breaking Dawn – Part 1

== Criticism ==
Despite being heavily critically panned, the awards received some criticism for the nomination Jack & Jill in the Worst Prequel, Remake of Rip-off or Sequel category described as a "Remake/Ripoff of Glen or Glenda" despite bearing no resemblance beyond that they both feature male actors portraying both male and female characters; this was widely viewed as an excuse to nominate the film in every category.

== Films with multiple nominations ==
These films garnered multiple nominations:

Nominations	Films
12	Jack and Jill
8	Transformers: Dark of the Moon
8	The Twilight Saga: Breaking Dawn – Part 1
6	Bucky Larson: Born to be a Star
5	Just Go With It
5	New Year's Eve
3	Big Mommas: Like Father, Like Son
2	Arthur
2	Drive Angry
2	The Hangover Part II
2	Season of the Witch
2	Trespass
