= The Man Who Invented Christmas =

The Man Who Invented Christmas may refer to:

- The Man Who Invented Christmas, a 2008 novel by Les Standiford
- The Man Who Invented Christmas (film), a 2017 film by Bharat Nalluri, based on the novel
