= Atlanta Nights =

Intentionally bad 2004 collaborative novel

- Authors: "Travis Tea"
- Language: English
- Genre: Parody; Science fiction
- Publisher: Lulu
- Publication date: January 26, 2005
- Publication place: United States
- ISBN: 978-1-4116-2298-2

Atlanta Nights is a collaborative novel created in 2004 by a group of science fiction and fantasy authors, with the express purpose of producing an unpublishable bad piece of work, so as to test whether publishing firm PublishAmerica would still accept it. It was accepted; after the hoax was revealed, the publisher withdrew its offer.

The primary purpose of the exercise was to test PublishAmerica's claims to be a "traditional publisher" that would only accept high-quality manuscripts. Critics had long claimed that PublishAmerica is actually a vanity press that paid no special attention to the sales potential of the books they published, since most of their revenue came from the authors rather than book buyers. PublishAmerica had previously made some derogatory public remarks about science fiction and fantasy writers. In light of the fact that many of their critics came from those communities, those derogatory remarks influenced the decision to make such a public test of PublishAmerica's claims.

== Background ==
PublishAmerica described itself as a "traditional publisher" and claimed to accept only high-quality manuscripts for publication. Its website further stated that the company received over 70 manuscripts a day and rejected most of them.

At one point, PublishAmerica posted articles on their AuthorsMarket website stating that, among other things:

[S]cience-fiction and fantasy writers have it easier. It's unfair, but such is life. As a rule of thumb, the quality bar for sci-fi and fantasy is a lot lower than for all other fiction. Therefore, beware of published authors who are self-crowned writing experts. When they tell you what to do and not to do in getting your book published, always first ask them what genre they write. If it's sci-fi or fantasy, run. They have no clue about what it is to write real-life stories, and how to find them a home. Unless you are a sci-fi or fantasy author yourself.

— Author's Market: Never Trust the "Experts"

But, alas, the SciFi and Fantasy genres have also attracted some of the lesser gods, writers who erroneously believe that SciFi, because it is set in a distant future, does not require believable storylines, or that Fantasy, because it is set in conditions that have never existed, does not need believable every-day characters. Obviously, and fortunately, there are not too many of them, but the ones who are indeed not ashamed to be seen as literary parasites and plagiarists, are usually the loudest, just like the proverbial wheel that needs the most grease.

— Author's Market: Only Trust Your Own Eyes

== Preparation ==
In retaliation, a group of science fiction and fantasy authors under the direction of James D. Macdonald collaborated on a deliberately low-quality work, complete with obvious grammatical errors, nonsensical passages, and a complete lack of a coherent plot. The effort was partly inspired by another collaborative "hoax" work, Naked Came the Stranger, as the working title of Atlanta Nights was Naked Came the Badfic.

The distinctive flaws of Atlanta Nights include nonidentical chapters written by two different authors from the same segment of outline (13 and 15), a missing chapter (21), two chapters that are word-for-word identical (4 and 17), two different chapters with the same chapter number (12 and 12), and a chapter "written" by a computer program that generated random text based on patterns found in the previous chapters (34). Characters change gender and race; they die and reappear without explanation. Spelling and grammar are nonstandard and the formatting is inconsistent. The initials of characters who were named in the book spelled out the phrase "PublishAmerica is a vanity press."

Under Macdonald's direction, the denouement, which takes place in the middle of the book, revealed that all the previous events of the plot had been a dream, although the book continues for several more chapters.

== Submission ==
The completed manuscript was offered to PublishAmerica by an unrevealed person not usually associated with fiction. The manuscript was accepted for publication on December 7, 2004. The hoaxers reviewed the contract with legal counsel, and made the decision not to carry the hoax through to actually publishing the book.

On January 23, 2005, the authors publicly revealed the hoax. PublishAmerica retracted its acceptance the following day, stating that after "further review" the novel failed to meet their standards.

== Publication ==
The authors subsequently published the book through print on demand publisher Lulu under the pseudonym "Travis Tea" with all profits going to the Science Fiction and Fantasy Writers of America Emergency Medical Fund. Teresa Nielsen Hayden's review said, "The world is full of bad books written by amateurs. But why settle for the merely regrettable? Atlanta Nights is a bad book written by experts."

== Authors ==
The authors of the chapters of this book include:

- Chapter 1 – Sherwood Smith
- Chapter 2 – James D. Macdonald
- Chapter 3 – Sheila Finch
- Chapter 4 – Charles Coleman Finlay
- Chapter 5 – Julia West
- Chapter 6 – Brook West
- Chapter 7 – Adam-Troy Castro
- Chapter 8 – Allen Steele
- Chapter 9 – Alan Rodgers
- Chapter 10 – Mary Catelli
- Chapter 11 – Andrew Burt
- Chapter 12 – Victoria Strauss
- Chapter 12 – Shira Daemon (There are two "Chapter 12"s)
- Chapter 13 – Vera Nazarian
- Chapter 14 – Sean P. Fodera
- Chapter 15 – Teresa Nielsen Hayden
- Chapter 16 – Ken Houghton
- Chapter 17 – Charles Coleman Finlay (Identical to Chapter 4)
- Chapter 18 – M. Turville Heitz
- Chapter 19 – Kevin O'Donnell Jr.
- Chapter 20 – Chuck Rothman
- Chapter 22 – Laura J. Underwood (Chapter 21 was "missing")
- Chapter 23 – Jena Snyder
- Chapter 24 – Paul Melko
- Chapter 25 – Tina Kuzminski
- Chapter 26 – Ted Kuzminski
- Chapter 27 – Megan Lindholm/Robin Hobb
- Chapter 28 – Danica and Brook West
- Chapter 29 – Rowan and Julia West
- Chapter 30 – Derryl Murphy
- Chapter 31 – Michael Armstrong
- Chapter 32 – Pierce Askegren
- Chapter 33 – Deanna Hoak
- Chapter 34 – Computer-generated by the software Bonsai Story Generator
- Chapter 35 – Catherine Mintz
- Chapter 36 – Peter Heck
- Chapter 37 – M. Turville Heitz
- Chapter 38 –
- Chapter 39 – Brenda Clough
- Chapter 40 – Judi B. Castro
- Chapter 41 – Terry McGarry

== Film ==
The book and the story behind it were optioned for a film in February 2011 by producing team Roy C. Booth and Rachael Saltzman, who were also slated to co-write and co-direct the film. The options money has gone to the SFWA Emergency Medical Fund. Production was tentatively scheduled to begin August 2011, but on May 16, 2011 the crowd funding campaign ended without reaching its goal.

== See also ==
- The Eye of Argon
- I, Libertine
- Naked Came the Manatee, a 1996 serialized South Florida mystery thriller parody
