= Naked Came the Stranger =

1969 'Penelope Ashe' novel

- First edition (publ. Lyle Stuart)
- Language: English
- Published: 1969
- Publication place: United States

Naked Came the Stranger is a 1969 novel written as a literary hoax poking fun at the American literary culture of its time. Though credited to "Penelope Ashe", it was written by a group of twenty-four journalists led by Newsday columnist Mike McGrady.

McGrady's intention was to write a book that was both deliberately terrible and contained a lot of descriptions of sex, to illustrate the point that popular American literary culture had become mindlessly vulgar. The book fulfilled the authors' expectations and became a bestseller in 1969. Later that year, they revealed the hoax, spurring the book's popularity.

== Hoax ==
Mike McGrady was convinced that popular American literary culture had become so base—with the best-seller lists dominated by the likes of Harold Robbins and Jacqueline Susann—that any book could succeed if enough sex was thrown in. To test his theory, in 1966 McGrady recruited a team of Newsday colleagues (according to Andreas Schroder, nineteen men and five women) to collaborate on a sexually explicit novel with no literary or social value whatsoever. McGrady co-edited the project with Harvey Aronson. Among the other collaborators were well-known writers including 1965 Pulitzer Prize winner Gene Goltz, 1970 Pulitzer Prize winner Robert W. Greene, and journalist Marilyn Berger.

The group wrote the book as a deliberately inconsistent hodge-podge, with each chapter written by a different author. Some of the chapters had to be exactingly edited, because they were judged as originally too well written.

The book was submitted for publication under the pseudonym "Penelope Ashe"; the fictional author was portrayed by McGrady's sister-in-law Billie Young for photographs and meetings with publishers. The back of the first print run's dust jacket features a black-and-white picture of a fully clothed Young with her pet Afghan Hound and the accompanying caption: "PENELOPE ASHE is a demure Long Island housewife...."

Lyle Stuart was an independent publisher then known for controversial books, many with sexual content. According to Stuart, he had appropriated the cover photo (a kneeling nude woman with very long hair down her back, photographed from behind) from a Hungarian nudist magazine. Both the model and photographer later demanded and received payment for their work.

== Synopsis ==
Gillian and William Blake are the hosts of a popular New York City breakfast radio chat show, The Billy & Gilly Show, where they play the perfect couple. When Gillian finds out that her husband is having an affair, she decides to cheat on him with a variety of men from their Long Island neighborhood. Most of the book is taken up by vignettes describing Gilly's adventures with a variety of men, from a progressive rabbi to a mobster.

The first chapter introduces the Blakes and the book's plot, with the thirteen subsequent chapters titled and about the characters seduced by Gillian (actual writers in parentheses).

- Billy and Gilly
- Ernie Miklos
- Morton Earbrow (George Vecsey)
- Joshua Turnbull (Jack Schwartz)
- Arthur Franhop
- Mario Vella
- Marvin Goodman (Bernie Bookbinder)
- Alan Hetterton
- Paddy Madigan
- Taylor Hawkes (William McIlwain Jr.)
- Ansel Varth
- Melvin Corby
- Willoughby Martin (Gene Goltz)
- Zoltan Caradoc

== Reception ==
The book fulfilled McGrady's cynical expectations, and sales soon reached 20,000 copies, whereupon the co-authors decided to go public, in August 1969. The male authors gave their confession on The David Frost Show, after being introduced as "Penelope Ashe" and walking out on stage, single file, as the orchestra played the song "A Pretty Girl Is Like a Melody". The revelation of the true origins of the book prompted more sales with the book selling approximately 90,000 copies by October 13, 1969.

The New York Times critiqued in its 3 August 1969 book review, "In the category of erotic fantasy, this one rates about a C. The passing grade is for the author's attempt to twine a few thin strands of humor into her wishful thinking." By the end of the year, the book had spent 13 weeks on the New York Times Best-Seller List, although by that time its authorship was common knowledge. It is unclear how much of the book's success was due to its content and how much to publicity about its unusual origin. Profits from its book sales were equally distributed amongst all 25 contributors. As of May 2012, the book's publisher reported the book had sold 400,000 copies.

In 1970, McGrady published Stranger Than Naked, or How to Write Dirty Books for Fun and Profit, which told the story of the hoax.

== Film ==
Naked Came the Stranger was adapted in 1975 as directed by Radley Metzger and starring Darby Lloyd Rains. As reported by The Washington Post, "Mr. McGrady and the other writers had nothing to do with the hardcore film with the same title. They did, however, see the movie at a Times Square theater. During one vivid scene, Aronson told The Charlotte Observer, someone shouted 'Author, Author!' 'Seventeen of us stood up.'"

== See also ==
- Atlanta Nights, a later literary hoax
- I, Libertine, an earlier literary hoax
- Naked Came the Manatee, a 1996 serialized South Florida mystery thriller parody
