= The Last Resort (2018 film) =

2018 film directed by Dennis Scholl and Kareem Tabsch

- Release date: 2018
- Country: United States
- Language: English

The Last Resort is a documentary film about Miami Beach directed by Dennis Scholl and Kareem Tabsch. It features photographs taken between 1976 and 1986 by photographers Andy Sweet and Gary Monroe.

The film focuses on the transformation of South Beach between the 1960s and 1980s. In the 1960s South Beach was an inexpensive retirement community, populated largely by working and lower middle class Jewish retirees. By the early 1980s the housing was deteriorating, and, in the wake of the Mariel boatlift and the Miami drug war South Beach became a dangerous neighborhood.

Context and commentary are provided by interviews with Susan Gladstone, Director of the Jewish Museum of Florida, filmmaker Kelly Reichardt, who grew up in South Beach, and Edna Buchanan, a crime novelist who grew up in Miami Beach and covered crime for Miami newspapers in the period documented by Monroe and Sweet.

== Reception ==
On review aggregator website Rotten Tomatoes the film has an approval rating of 92% based on 13 critics, with an average rating of 7.6/10. On Metacritic, the film have an above average score of 76 out of 100 based on 6 critics, indicating "generally favorable reviews".

The film was called "Poignantly nostalgic" by Frank Scheck of The Hollywood Reporter.
