= Andy Sweet =

American documentary photographer

- Born: Andrew John Sweet; November 9, 1953; Miami Beach, Florida, US
- Died: October 17, 1982 (aged 28); Miami Beach, Florida, US
- Known for: Photography
- Awards: National Endowment of the Arts

Andrew John Sweet (November 9, 1953 – October 17, 1982) was an American photographer known for his documentary photography and street photography. He photographed the life and residents of South Beach, with a particular focus on the Jewish community, many of them Holocaust survivors. Sweet also captured the carefree young people who made Miami Beach their second home. The Oxford American wrote a story on his vision of capturing a disappearing Jewish Community in Miami Beach.

His violent death and the following trials were covered extensively in the media. The son of a prominent Miami Beach family, the gruesome nature of his death diverted attention from his art just when his work was gaining a following. By mischance, his negatives were lost, leaving only the prints he had made as his legacy, their colors slowly fading away. In 2006, Ellen Sweet Moss' partner, Stan Hughes, found a trove of color ‘work prints’ Sweet made prior to printing full-size prints, Hughes realized that digital technology could be used to restore the fading colors back to the original color that Andy Sweet intended by using color photography instead of the black and white photography that was popular during this era.

The discovery of Sweet's test prints in a family storage unit has garnered new interest in his documentary photography. Some of his surviving prints have been restored over the last decade.

A documentary on his life and photography was released in 2018.

The Andy Sweet Photo Legacy Foundation, founded by his sister and artist Ellen Sweet Moss, is dedicated to increasing awareness of his photography and organizing exhibits of his work.

== Early life ==
Sweet was born in Miami Beach and attended Miami Beach Senior High School. Sweet and his family had ties to the Miami Beach Community. Sweet's grandfather Nat Hankoff was one of the founders of Temple Emanu-El in Miami Beach. Sweet had his bar-mitzvah and funeral at the temple. His uncle Ted Hankoff (1922–2016) was a graduate of Cornell University and was a second lieutenant in the US Navy during World War II. Hankoff was best known for being the general manager of many Miami Beach hotels during the 1950s, 1960s, 1970s and early 1980s and the World Wide Discount Travel Club. Andy and Ellen's family built the Monte Carlo and the Royal Palm along with the Roses.

Sweet graduated from Miami Beach Senior High School. After completing a master's degree from the University of Colorado in Fine Arts (with a focus on photography) in 1977, Sweet along with his friend and fellow university graduate Gary Monroe decided to devote the next ten years of their lives to the "Miami Beach Photographic Project". Sweet spent every day of the next five years photographing a fading era of Miami Beach before the city became gentrified. Monroe recounted that Sweet told him that if one of them died, the other would have to continue the project. Early on, the project received much recognition and Sweet and Monroe were awarded grants of $135,000 from the National Endowment of the Arts, Housing and Urban Development and the Department of Labor. Monroe was featured by NPR: “A Photographer's Ode To Unsung Artists”.

== Death ==
Sweet was murdered in 1982, when he was 28 years old. He was stabbed 29 times in his Miami Beach apartment. The Miami Herald Tropic Magazine ran a cover story on his death and documentary photography, "Andy Sweet: A Portrait". "Though young, Sweet was virtually an institution on the Beach, having made thousands of images of the place and the people. He had once done a series on city employees and among them is the photo of one of the detectives assigned to probe his homicide...".

For years the Sweet family tried to get the murderers convicted. The media covered the trials over the years.

Sweet's father, Nelan "Chick" Sweet, was a municipal judge and past president of the Miami Beach Bar Association. He stopped practicing law, losing faith that his son's murderers would ever be justly prosecuted. Two men were later convicted of his murder. Jesus Ortiz, 31, a drifter from Austin, Texas, and John Taylor, 24, a Miami native, claimed to have killed Sweet in a search for cocaine. A third suspect, Marko Dukanovic, a homeless drifter, was later indicted in 1999 with DNA evidence that showed an extra set of fingerprints. But after 12 years in state psychiatric facilities, he was released. The media covered the long process of the trials.

== Restoring lost photos ==
For years the family was too distraught to deal with the issue of how to preserve the thousands of negatives and color prints that Sweet left behind. In 1986 Sweet's parents had those negatives stored in a professional warehouse only to find out ten years later that the only five existing boxes of negatives were lost. Devastated that the storage company was only willing to compensate them $5.00 for their son's life work, the Sweets took the company to court. The settlement money was later used to preserve his existing work. Meanwhile, in 1991 the book Miami Beach was finally published with the work the two photographers originally started in 1977. It included a foreword by Isaac Bashevis Singer.

In 2006 thirty boxes with contact sheets of Sweet's work were accidentally discovered in a family storage unit by Stan Hughes, the partner of Andy's sister Ellen Sweet Moss. Since the discovery, Hughes has been restoring hundreds of these prints. The family created the Andy Sweet Photo Legacy, a 501(c)3 charitable foundation, with funds gained from the storage facility that lost Sweet's negatives. The Andy Sweet Photo Legacy Foundation was created to support, promote, and educate the public about the work Sweet created.

== Recognition ==
Sweet's work was appreciated by other documentary photographers. When photographer Mary Ellen Mark "came to town, she asked the young Sweet to show her around town. She fell for his style, praising his "strong, humorous, and beautiful images." She'd later write that his body of work was "unprecedented for someone so young...He definitely would have gone on to make many more wonderful images and to become a real photographic force."

The Miami Beach Commission voted on Wednesday, December 14, 2016, to have a plaque erected in the Art Deco District in honor of Sweet.

== Influences and awards ==
"Our early interest in photographing a city we love was like a magnet that kept drawing us back...a city that could be observed and preserved through photographic documentation", Sweet told The Miami News.

Sweet portrayed aging Jewish seniors in the Art Deco District, many of whom were Holocaust survivors.

Ed Christin serves as Sweet's archivist. Sweet documented the Jewish community on South Beach, starting in 1977 through 1982. It was where he grew up, and where he recognized a unique time in history, when the Jewish residents of Miami Beach brought their cultural touchstones with them. They converted hotels into makeshift synagogues, supported each other, and kept their traditions alive. Many were Holocaust survivors who were drawn to the warm weather of South Florida.

Sweet was awarded two grants from the National Endowment for the Arts for the Miami Beach Project.

== Exhibitions ==
- 24 Collection, Midtown Miami, Florida, circa 1979
- Sweet: Photography by Andy Sweet, Miami Beach Cinematheque, Miami Beach, Florida, September–November 2016
- Art Basel, Wynwood, Miami, Florida. Ed Christin Collection at PINTA Fair, November–December 2016
- Miami Design Preservation League's' "Art Deco Weekend", Miami Beach, Florida, January 2017
- Vintage Miami, Denise Bibro Fine Art Co., New York City, March 2017
- South Beach, 1974-1990: Photographs of a Jewish Community, HistoryMiami Museum, Miami, Florida, June 2017-2018

== Publications with contributions by Sweet ==
- Miami Beach: Photographs by Gary Monroe and Andy Sweet. 1989. By Gary Monroe (Author), Isaac Bashevis Singer (Author), Sweet (Author). ISBN 0961898615, ISBN 978-0961898618.

== Film ==
A documentary film about Miami Beach, with photographs taken between 1976 and 1986 by Sweet and Gary Monroe, called The Last Resort, was released in 2018.
