= Vicki Hendricks =

American author

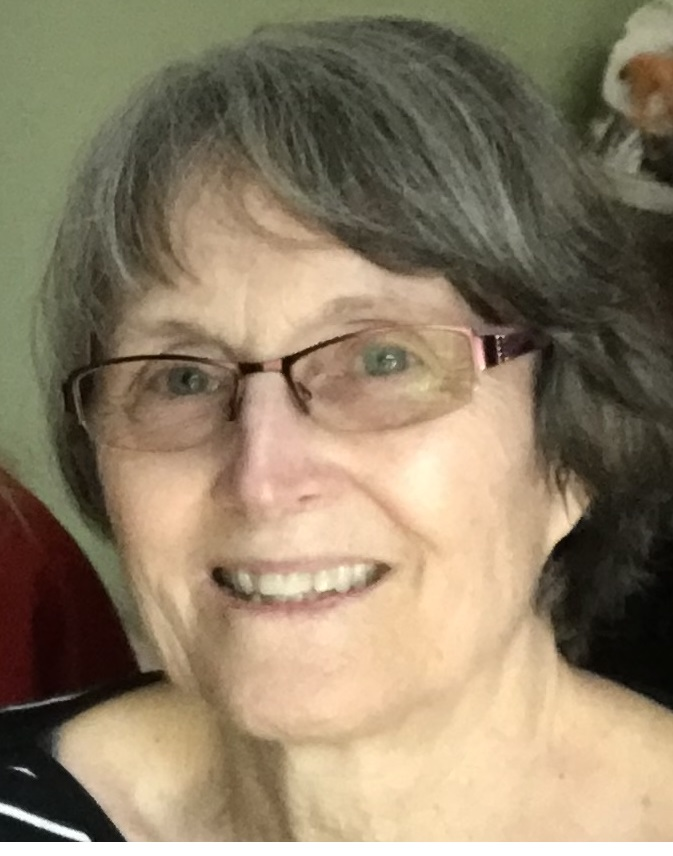
- Hendricks in 2023
- Born: Covington, Kentucky, U.S.
- Education: Ohio State University (BS); Florida Atlantic University (MA); Florida International University (MFA)
- Writing career
- Genres: Crime; Noir; Erotica
- Subject: English
- Notable works: Miami Purity; Cruel Poetry
- Notable awards: Edgar Award Finalist
- Website: vickihendricks.com

Vicki Due Hendricks is an American author of crime fiction, erotica, and a variety of short stories.

== Background ==
Hendricks was born in Covington, Kentucky, raised in Cincinnati, Ohio, and moved to Florida in 1973. She earned a B.S. in English education from Ohio State University in 1973, an M.A. in English from Florida Atlantic University in 1979, and an M.F.A. in creative writing from Florida International University in 1992. Hendricks' novel Cruel Poetry was a finalist for the Edgar Award in 2008. Her work has been translated into Italian, German, French, Finnish, Hebrew, Spanish, Portuguese, Dutch, Korean, Japanese and Chinese. She taught as a Professor of English at Broward College in Hollywood, Florida, from 1981 to 2016.

Hendricks has been praised as the "Queen of Noir" for rejuvenating women's crime/noir in the nineties and both extolled and denounced for her graphic use of sexual elements that distinguish neo-noir from noir of the 1930s through 1950s. Her novels have been reviewed in The New York Times Review of Books, Publishers Weekly, Kirkus Reviews, and the American Library Association's Booklist, as well as newspapers, blogs, and review sites.

== Bibliography ==
=== Novels ===
- Miami Purity (200 pages, hardback, Pantheon Books, 1995, ISBN 0-679-43988-9, paperback; reprint: Busted Flush Press, 2007, ISBN 978-0-9792709-3-2)
- Iguana Love (185 pages, hardback, Serpent's Tail, 1999, ISBN 1-85242-628-4)
- Voluntary Madness (215 pages, hardback, Serpent's Tail, 2000, ISBN 1-85242-666-7, paperback, Serpent's Tail, 2002, ISBN 1-85242-751-5)
- Sky Blues (230 pages, hardback, St. Martin's Press, 2002, ISBN 0-312-28346-6, paperback, Serpent's Tail, 2002, ISBN 1-85242-805-8)
- Cruel Poetry (312 pages, paperback, Serpent's Tail, 2007, ISBN 978-1-85242-927-0)
- Fur People (286 pages, paperback, Winona Woods, 2013, ISBN 978-0615921723)

=== Collections ===
- Florida Gothic Stories (228 pages, paperback, Kitsune Books, 2010, ISBN 978-0981949536)
- Dangerous Sex: Three Stories (Kindle, 2011)

=== Short stories, excerpts, chapters ===
- "Dance of the Manatee." Chapter 10. Naked Came the Manatee. Ed. Tom Shroder. Putnam, 1997.
- Excerpt from Iguana Love. "Zingmagazine". Ed. Brian Antoni. Issue 4, July, 1997.
- "West End." Murder for Revenge. Ed. Otto Penzler. Delacorte, 1998.
- "Penile Infraction." Dick for a Day. Ed. Fiona Giles. Villard, 1997; Having a Wonderful Time. Ed. John Dufresne. Simon & Schuster, 1998.
- "The Perfect Couple." Miami Metro, 1998.
- "ReBecca." Nerve. Ed. Genevieve Fields 1998; Best American Erotica 2000. Ed. Susie Bright. Scribner's; Vox and Roll. Ed. Richard Thomas. Serpent's Tail. 1999; Sweet and Vicious CD. Read by Parker Posey. Nerve Studios Productions, 1999.
- "Tender Fruit." The Mammoth Book of Erotica. Ed. Maxim Jakubowski. Thunder's Mouth. UK, 2000.
- Excerpt from Miami Purity. Le Livre du Plaisir. Ed. Catherine Breillat. Edit1ions. France, Jan, 2000.
- "Gators." Mississippi Review. Noir Issue. Ed. Anthony Neil Smith, 2000; Flesh and Blood. Ed. Max Allan Collins and Jeff Gelb. Warner Books, 2001; Mississippi Review: "Best of" Issue. Ed. Frederick Barthelme. Vol 9, #4. Fall, 2003. Miami Noir: The Classics. Ed. Les Standiford, Akashic, 2020.
- "Alligatoren." ("Gators.") German trans. Die 7 Todsünden, Heyne Verlag, Germany, 2002.
- "Stormy, Mon Amour." Tart Noir. Eds. Lauren Henderson and Stella Duffy. Berkeley Books, 2002; Gulf Stream. Florida International University. #22, 2004.
- "Must Bite." Dying for It: Tales of Sex and Death. Ed. Mitzi Szereto. Thunder's Mouth Press, 2006; Susie Bright's Erotic Treasury, 2008.
- "Purrz, Baby." Mississippi Review: High Pulp. Ed. Anthony Neil Smith. 2005; Deadly Housewives. Ed. Christine Matthews. HarperCollins, 2006.
- "Boozanne, Lemme Be." Miami Noir. Ed. Les Standiford. Akashic, 2006; Men Undressed: Women Writers on the Male Sexual Experience. Eds. Stacy Bierlein, Gina Frangello, Cris Mazza and Kat Meads. OV Press, 2011.
- "West End." Finnish trans. Isku Jannityskertomuksia, No 4, 2006.
- "Chapter Eleven." American Casanova : The New Adventures of the Legendary Lover. Ed. Maxim Jacubowski. Thunder's Mouth, 2006.
- "The Big O." A Hell of a Woman: An Anthology of Female Noir. Ed. Megan Abbott. Busted Flush Press, 2007.
- "Be Very Afraid." Getting Even: Revenge Stories. Ed. Mitzi Szereto. Serpent's Tail, 2007.
- "Sinny and the Prince: A Fairy Tale." Murdaland. Ed. Michael Langnas. Mug Shot Press, 2007.
- "Sweet Dreams." Gulf Stream. Ed. Joe Clifford. Florida International University, 2008.
- "Woodster." Drinking with Papa Legba. Ed. Lee Anderson. Le Chat Noir II. 2011, 102–115.
- "Purrz, Baby." Beat to a Pulp II. Ed. David Cranmer. 2012.
- "M-F Dog." Stray Dogs: Writing from the Other America. Ed. William Hastings. "Down & Out Books", 2014, 17–31.
- "Buxom Belle: Her Own Story." The Best New True Crime Stories: Serial Killers. Ed. Mitzi Szereto. Mango Publishing, 2019, 80–100.
- "The Good Cat." Retreats from Oblivion: The Journal of NoirCon. Ed. Cullen Gallagher. 2018. Short Story Anthology 2021. "Palm Circle Press". Ed. Lee Anderson. 2021, 85–96.

=== Non-fiction ===
- "Freshwater Diving Delight." Gold Coast Life. May, 1983, 56–57.
- "Last Call for Lobster." Gold Coast Life. February, 1984, 60–61+
- "Miami's Metrozoo." Florida's Goldcoast. December, 1984.
- "Felix Mas." Florida's Goldcoast. March, 1985, 33–35.
- "Leadership and The One-Minute Manager." Florida's Goldcoast. September 1985, 31–32.
- "In Search of Buffalo Wings." Boca Raton. Summer, 1987, 132.
- "The Line of the Sun: Analysis of Judith Ortiz Cofer's Novel." Masterplots II: Women in Literature. Salem Press. 1995, 1309–1313.
- "Wrestling Hemingway: Imitating Author's Life Brings Novel Inspiration." Miami Herald. July 18, 1999.
- "Four Dog Nights: Dogsledding in Finland." Fort Lauderdale Sun-Sentinel. December 31, 2000.
- "Dying to Dive." The Observer Sport Monthly. September, 2002.
- "Out in the Blue: The Adventures of Skydiving and Writing." Crimespree Magazine. # 3, October–November, 2004.
- "The Ketchup-Lid Skirt." Desire: Women Write About Wanting. Seal Press, 2007.
- "When in Madagascar." Grabbed: Poets and Writers on Sexual Assault, Empowerment, and Healing. Ed. Richard Blanco, et al. Beacon Press. 2020, 58–59.

== Interviews ==
- "Vicki Hendricks" Interrogations. Jon Jordan. Mystery One Books, 2003.
- "Sex and Dolphins in the Sunshine State: An Interview with Vicki Hendricks" Gulf Stream. Melanie Neal. Florida International University, Vol 22, 2004.
- "Hollywood Beach: Body Heat" Back to the Badlands. John Williams, Serpent's Tail, 2007.
- "Vicki Hendricks: South Florida Noir Specialist." Ellen Smith. Florida Crime Writers. Ed. Steve Glassman. McFarland and Company, 2008.
- "The Best New True Crime Stories: Serial Killers." with Vicki Hendricks. Mitzi Szereto, YouTube, 2020.
- "De cerca y en persona con la reina del Noir: Vicki Hendricks #EL Festivalon." Ozzie di Paolo Harrison. YouTube, 2022.
- "Vicki Hendricks, Miami Purity, and the Making of a Noir Classic." Craig Pittman. CrimeReads, 2023.

== Awards ==
- Cruel Poetry, Finalist for Edgar Award, Best Paperback Original, Mystery Writers of America, 2008.
- Florida Individual Artist Fellowship, September, 1998, Honorable Mention in Literature, "ReBecca."
