= Harvey Aronson =

American journalist, teacher and editor (1929–2025)

Harvey Aronson (May 1929 – September 2, 2025) was an American journalist and journalism teacher, and a Newsday editor who also wrote or co-wrote several books. He was part of a group of Newsday reporters involved in writing the bestselling hoax novel Naked Came the Stranger, initially credited to fictional author Penelope Ashe, and published as a parody of commercialized book publishing in general and of novels in the genre of Jacqueline Susann's Valley of the Dolls in particular. Aronson co-edited the project with his colleague, Mike McGrady, who had conceived the idea, and Aronson also wrote a chapter of the book about a character described in a later news article as "Melvin Corby, a meek real-estate lawyer, unsatisfied in his marriage yet incapable of adultery, the only character in the book thus afflicted." In a Life magazine article written after the ruse was revealed, Aronson commented that he thought the book had ended up being more comedic than pornographic, and he opined that Susann "writes about sex as if she were a virgin".

Aronson later published his own novel, The Golden Shore (1982), about the development of Miami Beach, but the book, which Kirkus Reviews called a "routine biz-family-saga", did not go beyond a first edition. Among his other books are The Defense Never Rests (1971), an autobiography of lawyer F. Lee Bailey co-written by Aronson, and a 1973 book about the killing of Mafia figure Joey Gallo.

Aronson was born in May 1929, and grew up in New York City, where his father was a sometime professional boxer who fought under the name "Kid Aron". Aronson attended Syracuse University. He was married to Irene Virag, who was also a Newsday reporter when they met. Aronson and Virag both became founding members of the faculty of the Stony Brook University School of Journalism when it was established in 2006. He died on September 2, 2025, at the age of 96.

== Bibliography ==
- Aronson, Harvey; McGrady, Mike (1976–1977). Establishment of Innocence. Putnam hardcover 1976, Berkely paper back 1976, Berkely mass-market paperback 1977. ISBN 9780399115400.
- Aronson, Harvey (1971). The Defense Never Rests. Stein and Day. ISBN 081281441X.
- Aronson, Harvey (1978). Deal. Ballantine Books. ISBN 978-0345253545.
- Aronson, Harvey (1973). The killing of Joey Gallo. New York: Putnam. ISBN 0399112111.
