= Ginny Rorby =

American novelist

Ginny Rorby (born 9 August 1944) is an American young adult novelist. She was raised in Winter Park, Florida and lived in Miami during her career as a Pan American flight attendant. She studied biology at the University of Miami and went on to receive an M.F.A. in creative writing from Florida International University. She was co-director of the Mendocino Coast Writers Conference (www.mcwc.org) for eight years. She lives in northern California.

== Works ==
- Dolphin Sky (G. P. Putnam's Sons, 1996)
- Hurt Go Happy (Starscape, 2006) was chosen as one of the top 100 books to read and share by the New York Public Library in 2007 for its wonderful description of a deaf young teen who befriends a chimpanzee that signs.
- The Outside of a Horse (Dial Penguin, 2010)
- Lost in the River of Grass (Lerner Books, 2011)
- How to Speak Dolphin (Scholastic Press, 2017)
- Freeing Finch (Tom Doherty Associates, 2019)
- Like Dust, I Rise (Black Rose Writing, 2022)
- Girl Under Glass (Black Rose Writing, 2024)
