= Brian Antoni =

American novelist

Brian Antoni is the author of the novel South Beach: The Novel. South Beach: The Novel is based on Antoni's firsthand knowledge of the resurgence of Miami Beach in the past two decades. His writing has also been included in the parody novel Naked Came the Manatee, where he wrote one of the chapters. He also writes non-fiction articles for travel magazines.

== Background ==
Brian Antoni was born in Detroit, Michigan, but was raised in Freeport Bahamas. His parents are from Trinidad. His sister is Janine Antoni, a well-known Bahamian artist. His brother Robert Antoni is a well-known Caribbean writer. Brian Antoni studied law at Emory University and obtained his law doctorate at Georgetown University. Although he never practiced as a lawyer, he is well known for his published book South Beach: The Novel. Brian Antoni currently lives in Miami Beach, New York City, and Key West.

== Bibliography ==
Novels

- 2008 – South Beach: The Novel
- 1997 – Paradise Overdose
- 1996 – Naked Came the Manatee
