= Spill (book) =

1991 fiction book by Les Standiford

- Cover by Peter Thorpe
- Author: Les Standiford
- Language: English
- Genre: Action Thriller
- Publisher: The Atlantic Monthly Press, New York
- Publication date: May 1, 1991
- Publication place: United States
- Media type: Print (paperback and hardback) eBook
- Pages: 326
- ISBN: 0330328409

Spill is a 1991 fictional thriller by Les Standiford about a lethal biological weapon that has leaked from a crashed tanker truck in Yellowstone National Park. Agents of PetroDyne Corporation, the Denver-based chemical company responsible for manufacturing the banned agent, works with its co-conspirators in the government to cover up the incident. A Yellowstone National Park Ranger named Jack Fairchild finds himself in the middle of the coverup and does everything in his power to help his friends escape an assassin named Skanz.

Spill was dramatized in Virus, a 1996 film directed by Allan A. Goldstein and starring Brian Bosworth.

== Plot ==
A lethal biological weapon has leaked from a crashed tanker truck in Yellowstone National Park. PetroDyne Chemical, the company manufacturing the substance banned by international treaty, sends the tanker from its headquarters in Denver to a storage facility in Idaho. The genetically engineered form of hemorrhagic fever has spilled into a waterway and has infected wildlife and humans in a popular camping area in the small town of West Yellowstone, Montana. The driver responsible for the spill has been paid by a rogue employee of the company to divert the shipment to the hills of Yellowstone.

Agents for PetroDyne work with local government officials who are aware of the transport of hazardous chemicals by the company to cover up the incident. The coverup involves finding any survivors of the spill, quarantining them, observing them, and even worse, allowing them to die and incinerating the bodies. The head of PetroDyne Corporation, a man named Schreiber who works at the company headquarters in Denver, directs a loyal employee named Alec Reisman and a half-mad hitman named Skanz to clean up the mess that was created.

Jack Fairchild is the Park Ranger who finds the truck driver who caused the spill, and other survivors, and must overcome all obstacles to free them from the grasp of PetroDyne’s security team.

== Reception ==
The book received reviews from publications including Publishers Weekly, Kirkus Reviews, Library Journal, Chicago Tribune, and Los Angeles Times.
