= Illusion Magic Lounge =

Theater in Santa Monica, California

- Interactive map of Illusion Magic Lounge
- Address: 1418 Fourth Street
- Location: Santa Monica, California
- Coordinates: 34.0159°N 118.4948°W
- Operator: Randy Sinnott
- Capacity: 150
- Type: Theatre
- Event: Magic
- Public transit: Downtown Santa Monica station

Construction
- Opened: September 18, 1998

Website
- www.illusionmagiclounge.com

Illusion Magic Lounge is a 150-seat theater in Santa Monica, California, founded in 1998 founded by magician Steve Spill. The venue was known as Magicopolis from 1998 until 2022. Magicopolis was the permanent home of Steve Spill's magic production, "Escape Reality", until 2019 when he sold the venue.

Magicians Penn & Teller cast their hands and feet in cement for the Magicopolis groundbreaking ceremony on March 25, 1998. Robert Holbrook, Mayor of the City of Santa Monica, on behalf of the City Council proclaimed March 25 to be "Magicopolis Day" in Santa Monica. Friday, September 18, 1998, marked the grand opening, and official ribbon cutters and special guest performers Penn & Teller took the stage and over the course of the evening performed some of their classic routines. To finish, Penn delivered a "heartfelt discourse on the value of seeing magic performed live and the importance of Magicopolis".

In 2019, Randy Sinnott, Sr and Randy Sinnott, Jr purchased the theater from Steve Spill. The theater and lobby were renovated during the COVID-19 pandemic and the theater reopened as Illusion Magic Lounge in December 2022.
