= America Star Books =

Defunct print-on-demand publisher

America Star Books, formerly PublishAmerica, is a Maryland-based print-on-demand book publisher founded in 1999 by Lawrence Alvin "Larry" Clopper III and Willem Meiners. Some writers and authors' advocates have accused the company of being a vanity press while representing itself as a "traditional publisher". It changed its name in 2014, and since 2017 it has stopped accepting new authors.

PublishAtlantica was an imprint of PublishAmerica. PublishAtlantica was headquartered in the UK in Milton Keynes. It was formerly PublishBritannica before a lawsuit from Encyclopædia Britannica. PublishIcelandica was another imprint of PublishAmerica. According to a letter from PublishAmerica in 2006, neither imprint is active.

== History ==
As of 2004, the executive director of PublishAmerica was Miranda N. Prather. In 2004, Prather said that 80% of authors who submitted manuscripts to the house were rejected, and that the house had "30 full-time editors" with plans to expand. She refused to identify the CEO of PublishAmerica. In 2005, the company had 70 full-time employees of various functions.

In 2004, PublishAmerica published small runs of over 4,800 titles. In 2005, the company had approximately 11,000 authors under contract.

In June 2005, PublishAmerica identified Willem Meiners as "PublishAmerica CEO" and Clopper as "company president".

In August 2005, PublishAmerica was sued by Encyclopædia Britannica for trademark violation over PublishAmerica's PublishBritannica imprint. The matter was settled out of court, with PublishAmerica agreeing to stop using the "PublishBritannica" name. However, PublishAmerica continued to use the website address on letterhead as late as 2008.

In late September 2005, PublishAmerica announced its books would be returnable by the bookseller if they failed to sell, a standard practice among other commercial publishers. The announcement stated that this applied to "all" of its books, though it noted that there would be "a few exceptions initially" and that the offer would apply to United States booksellers only. In 2009 PA's site said that "many of our books are returnable."

Prather left PublishAmerica (renamed America Star Books) in 2016.

== Criticism ==
PA pays advance fees of US$1–$1,000 to its authors, provides minimal editing, and provides few of the services handled by trade publishing, such as retail distribution, marketing and media relations. Disgruntled authors told Publishers Weekly that PA did not pay royalties owed to them, sold books it no longer had any rights to sell, set unreasonably high list prices and lower-than-average discounts for authors to buy their own books, and either neglected or failed to place books into bookstores.

PublishAmerica's Prather stated that book prices reflected "what the market would bear" and that "we don't control the bookstores in the country." Other PublishAmerica authors have spoken out in support of the publisher, denying it is a vanity press and highlighting the opportunities it gives to unpublished authors.

=== Acceptance of hoax manuscripts ===
In an attempt to demonstrate a lack of editorial oversight at PublishAmerica, several authors have written "sting" manuscripts. For instance, in December 2004, PublishAmerica agreed to publish the novel Atlanta Nights, which was later revealed to be a deliberately badly written hoax, featuring every "bad writing" trope the authors could conceive of and one chapter randomly generated by a computer. PublishAmerica also accepted another author's manuscript that featured the same 30 pages repeated ten times.

=== 2005 arbitration case ===
In December 2005, PublishAmerica author Philip Dolan, who had spent between US$7,000 and $13,000 promoting his book, learned that no book stores were able to order copies of it.

He took PublishAmerica to arbitration for breach of contract. Dolan also alleged accounting irregularities: despite a clause in his contract allowing him to inspect PublishAmerica's accounts, his accountant was denied access. Dolan received royalties for fewer copies of his book than he was able to account for having sold himself. He was awarded an unspecified amount in compensation for PublishAmerica's breach of contract, and his contract was rescinded.

=== Lawsuit ===
In June 2012, a class action lawsuit was filed in Maryland District federal court against PublishAmerica LLLP, by plaintiffs Darla Yoos, Edwin McCall, and Kerry Levine.

== New name ==
In January 2014, PublishAmerica changed its name to America Star Books. In 2017, America Star Books became ASB Promotions and ceased accepting new authors.
