= Mitzi Szereto =

American-British author

- Occupations: Author, Editor, Short Story Writer, Web TV Entrepreneur, Speaker, Lecturer
- Writing career
- Genres: Crime Fiction, True Crime, Suspense, Cozy Mystery, Gothic Fiction, Sci-Fi/Fantasy, Parody, Satire, Erotic Fiction, Genre Fiction, Dark Fantasy, Paranormal Romance, Horror, Humor, Southern Fiction, Apocalyptic and Post-apocalyptic fiction, and General Fiction and Nonfiction.
- Website: Mitzi Szereto

Mitzi Szereto is an American-British author of multi-genre fiction and nonfiction. She has written novels and short stories, and edited fiction and nonfiction anthologies, including her popular true crime franchise "The Best New True Crime Stories." Her books to date have been in the areas of crime fiction, true crime, cozy mystery, Gothic fiction, horror, quirky fiction, apocalyptic and post-apocalyptic fiction, paranormal romance, sci-fi/fantasy, erotic literature, parody and satire, Southern fiction, and fiction and nonfiction anthologies. She edited the first anthology of erotic fiction to include a Fellow of the Royal Society of Literature. A story contribution from her crime fiction anthology Getting Even: Revenge Stories received a “Highly Commended” from the Crime Writers’ Association’s (CWA) Short Story Dagger. Her books and short stories have been translated into several languages. She created/presented "Mitzi TV," a Web TV channel covering the quirky side of London, England; segments have ranged from chatting about vintage cars with Formula 1 race car driver/BBC TV presenter Tiff Needell and couture shoe designer Jimmy Choo to joining in a lively pub singalong and covering a teddy bear festival. She makes a cameo appearance portraying herself in the British mockumentary Lint the Movie. She also maintains a blog of humorous personal essays at "Errant Ramblings: Mitzi Szereto's Weblog."

Szereto also became known for teaching erotic writing workshops in the UK and continental Europe. She appears at book and literature festivals, and gives talks on such topics as social media, women in publishing, and erotic writing. She has performed readings of her work in North America and Europe and has lectured in creative writing at several universities.

== Novels ==
- Florida Gothic (2017)
- Phantom: The Immortal (co-authored with Ashley Lister) (2016)
- Rotten Peaches (The Thelonious T. Bear Chronicles) (2015)
- The Wilde Passions of Dorian Gray (2013)
- Normal for Norfolk (The Thelonious T. Bear Chronicles (2012)
- Pride and Prejudice: Hidden Lusts (2011)

== Original anthologies ==
- Women Who Murder: An International Collection of Deadly True Crime Tales (2024)
- The Best New True Crime Stories: Crimes of Famous & Infamous Criminals (2023)
- The Best New True Crime Stories: Unsolved Crimes & Mysteries (2022)
- The Best New True Crime Stories: Partners in Crime (2022)
- The Best New True Crime Stories: Crimes of Passion, Obsession & Revenge (2021)
- The Best New True Crime Stories: Well-Mannered Crooks, Rogues & Criminals (2021)
- The Best New True Crime Stories: Small Towns (2020)
- The Best New True Crime Stories: Serial Killers (2019)
- Ladies of Gothic Horror (A Collection of Classic Stories (2019)
- Love, Lust and Zombies: Short Stories (2015)
- Darker Edge of Desire: Gothic Tales of Romance (2014)
- Thrones of Desire: Erotic Tales of Swords, Mist and Fire (2012)
- Red Velvet and Absinthe: Paranormal Erotic Romance (2011)
- The New Black Lace Book of Women's Sexual Fantasies (2008)
- Getting Even: Revenge Stories (2007)
- Dying For It: Tales of Sex and Death (2006)
- The World's Best Sex Writing 2005 (2006)
- Wicked: Sexy Tales of Legendary Lovers (2005)
- Foreign Affairs: Erotic Travel Tales (2004)
- Erotic Travel Tales 2 (2003)
- Erotic Travel Tales (2001)

== Solo short story collections ==
- Oysters and Pearls: Collected Stories (2016)
- In Sleeping Beauty's Bed: Erotic Fairy Tales (2009)
- Erotic Fairy Tales: A Romp Through the Classics (2001)

== The Thelonious T. Bear Chronicles series ==
Since 2012, Szereto has co-authored the cozy mystery/satire series with her "celebrity" teddy bear Teddy Tedaloo. The series follows the (mis)adventures of protagonist Thelonious T. Bear, a Mini-Cooper driving photojournalist bear from England who must co-exist in the human world. The novels are set in various locations around the world and feature a cast of quirky characters. The books include:

- Rotten Peaches (The Thelonious T. Bear Chronicles) (2015), which takes place in the rural American South. An armed gang of "little people" wearing animal masks are on a bank-robbing spree, and Thelonious gets mistaken for one of the bandits.
- Normal for Norfolk (The Thelonious T. Bear Chronicles) (2012), which is set in the Norfolk countryside in England. Village pub landlords are being murdered, and Thelonious keeps turning up in the vicinity of the crimes, attracting the attention of an incompetent detective chief inspector.
