= Spilled! =

2025 cozy job simulation game

- Developer: Lente Cuenen
- Composer: Prologi
- Platforms: macOS, Windows, Nintendo Switch
- Release: macOS, Windows; March 26, 2025; Nintendo Switch; TBA
- Genres: Cozy; Job simulation
- Mode: Single-player

Spilled! is a 2025 cozy job simulation game developed by Dutch developer Lente Cuenen for macOS, Windows and Nintendo Switch. The player navigates a small boat through polluted waterways, collecting waste as part of an environmental clean-up.

== Gameplay ==
The player operates a small solar-powered boat to clean polluted waterways. The boat is used to collect various forms of waste, including oil slicks, and floating bottles using a boom. As well as submerged oil drums through magnet fishing. The boat is also equipped with a hose that serves multiple purposes: extinguishing fires along the river banks, washing oil off nearby land, and creating snow in specific areas that require it. The player receives money for cleaning the environment, which can be used to purchase upgrades for the boat. The game is divided into eight levels of increasing size and complexity. Each level includes two lost animals which can be rescued. The entire game can be completed in approximately an hour.

== Development ==
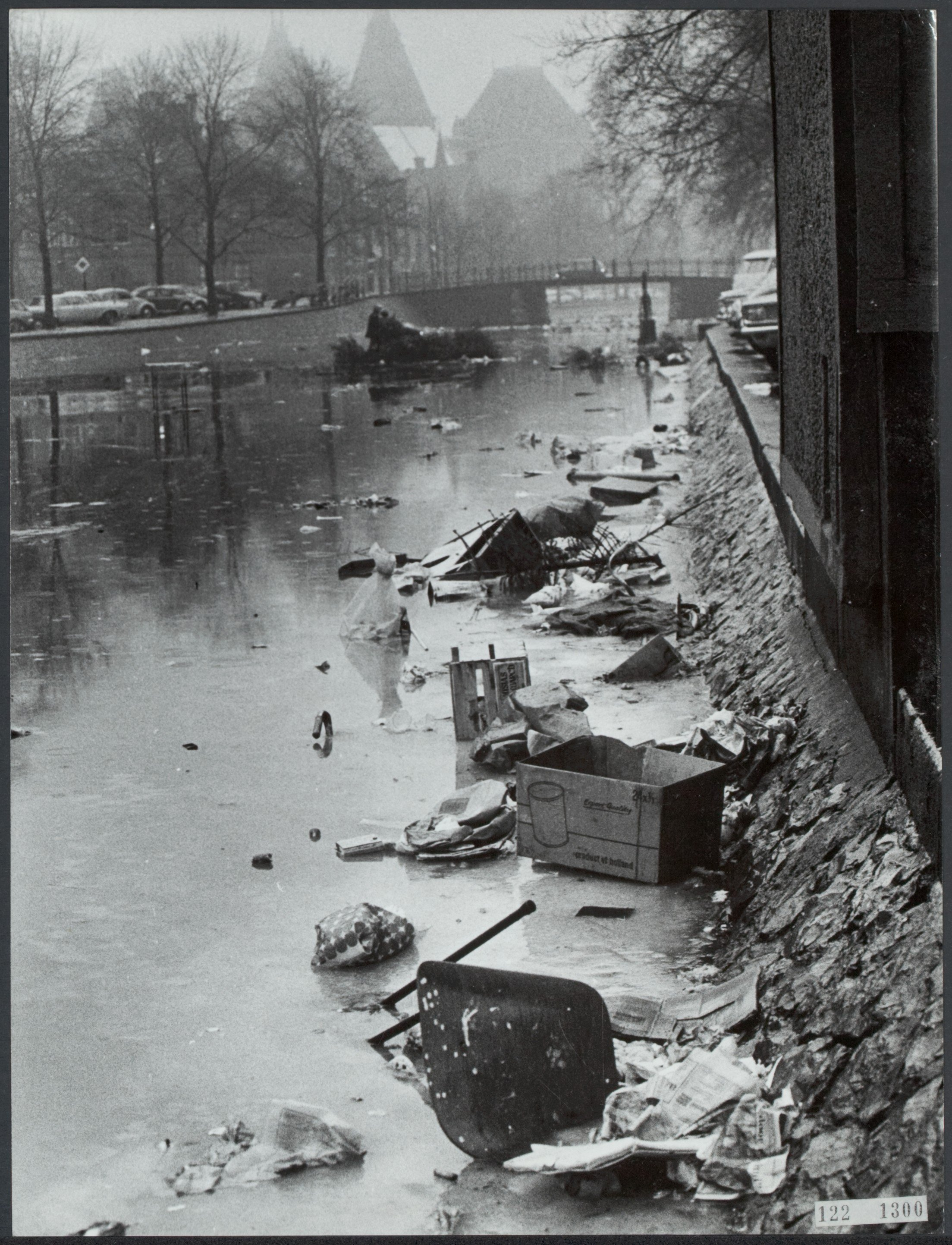
The game was inspired by poor water quality in Dutch canals during Cuenen's youth.

Spilled! was the first Steam release by Dutch developer Lente Cuenen, who grew up on a boat. She left school in late 2022, and used her savings to purchase her own boat, Zusje V. The name translates to "Little Sister Five" in English and refers to the other four boats that had been owned by the family over the course of her childhood. She renovated the boat with her mother, adding an electric motor, solar panels, and a Starlink receiver to enable internet access. The development began during this renovation period aboard Zusje V. Cuenen set out to raise awareness of marine pollution, inspired by the significant amount of waste she observed in the water during her childhood.

The project was funded by a successful Kickstarter campaign in early 2024, which passed its €10,000 goal in 12 hours. It ultimately went on to raise €31,621. A free demo was also made available on Steam.

A Nintendo Switch version was announced in June 2025, as part of the Women-Led Games Summer Game Fest broadcast.

== Reception ==
The game was received positively. Vice gave the title a "highly recommended" rating and praised the title's environmental messaging, relaxing nature, and added that the game's "beauty is more than skin deep." Kotaku was similarly positive, praising the simple premise, boat controls, and manner in which complexity was added with the later levels. GamesRadar+ compared the game favourably to PowerWash Simulator. Forbes listed the game as one of the best looking indie titles to watch out for in 2024. Their review on release was overwhelmingly positive, reporting that "it's pretty much impossible to find any complaints with it — except, of course, that you probably want it to go on for longer, and/or forever."

The game was a commercial success, selling 50,000 copies in the first month, largely driven by viral online word of mouth.

=== Awards ===
Year	Award	Category	Result	Ref.
2025	Golden Joystick Awards	Best Indie Game - Self Published	Nominated	
