= Steve Spill =

American magician

- Born: Steven Spillman; January 3, 1955 (age 71); San Francisco, California, U.S.
- Occupations: Magician, author
- Known for: Founding Magicopolis theater; "I Lie for Money"
- Spouse: Bozena Wrobel
- Website: https://stevespill.com

Steve Spill (born Steven Spillman; San Francisco, California; 3 January 1955) is an American magician and founder of Magicopolis, a 150-seat theater that opened in 1998 in Santa Monica, California, where Spill and his partner on and off the stage, Bozena, performed shows together featuring sleight-of-hand and large-scale illusions. (The theater, now called Illusion Magic Lounge has been under new ownership since 2019, opening in 2022).

Spill's shows have been praised by critics, theatergoers, feature writers, families, tourists, and magicians.

When Spill was young, his father was night manager of the Magic Castle. It was there that he met and was mentored by influential magicians such as Dai Vernon and Charlie Miller.

Prior to the opening of Magicopolis, Spill worked as a magic bartender at the Jolly Jester in Aspen, Colorado, c.1976–c.1980. Partner with Bob Sheets as "Sheets & Spill" c1978-85. Regular at Inn of Magic in Washington, DC, area 1981–85. Played Harrah's, Lake Tahoe, 1987–88. He has toured USA, South Africa (1990), the Caribbean (1993), Europe (1995), and Canada (1996). He wrote My Hands Can Be Yours (1973, 79pp), Imagine Magic (1974), Spill Bar & Grill (1980), and three cartoon booklets. On May 12, 2015, Spill's book I Lie for Money was published by Skyhorse Publishing.

Spill is known to magic aficionados as a performer who innovates magical effects used by other magicians, such as his version of Bill in Lemon and his Mindreading Goose. He has been featured in industry journals such as Genii, MAGIC, and M-U-M, and created the DVDs Ten Years of Steve Spill 1980–1990 and Confessions of a Needle Swallower. Spill lives with his wife Bozena in Hawaii, where they just completed a 50 show residency at the Kauai Hilton.

== Bibliography ==
- I Lie for Money: Candid, Outrageous Stories from a Magician's Misadventures (2015). Skyhorse Publishing.
- How to Make Love the Steve Spill Way (2018).
- Magic Is My Weed (2019).
- Assassin (2022).
- Holy Smoke: Ways to Work in Mysterious Ways If You're Not God (2024).
- TATTOO! (illustrated magic book test; publication date unconfirmed).
