= John Dufresne =

American dramatist

- Born: January 30, 1948 (age 78); Worcester, Massachusetts, U.S.
- Education: Worcester State College; University of Arkansas
- Occupation: Writer

John Dufresne (born January 30, 1948) is an American author of French Canadian descent born in Worcester, Massachusetts. He graduated from Worcester State College in 1970 and the University of Arkansas in 1984. He is a professor in the Master of Fine Arts Creative Writing program of the English Department at Florida International University. In 2012, he won a John Simon Guggenheim Memorial Foundation Fellowship for his work.

== Books ==
Dufresne's first novel, Louisiana Power and Light (1994), was named as one of New York Times' notable books of the year, as was his second novel, Love Warps the Mind a Little (1997).

Dufresne's third novel, Deep in the Shade of Paradise (2002), was a Book Sense Top Ten of the Year selection. It contains some of the same characters in Louisiana Power and Light, although in an interview with writer Max Ruback, which appeared in the Winter 2001 issue of the literary magazine Turnrow, Dufresne has said that he does not consider Deep in the Shade of Paradise to be a sequel. Both of these novels, however, developed from a long short story in Dufresne's first collection, The Way that Water Enters Stone (1991).

Dufresne published a second short story collection, Johnny Too Bad, in 2005. The title story of the book had previously been chosen for compilation in New Stories from the South: The Year's Best, 2003. In 2003, he also published The Lie That Tells a Truth: A Guide to Writing Fiction.

Dufresne published a fourth novel, Requiem, Mass., in 2008.

All of his books were published originally by W. W. Norton, which kept them in print except for his first book of short stories, The Way that Water Enters Stone. Plume, an imprint of Dutton-Signet, a division of Penguin Books, republished The Way that Water Enters Stone as a trade paperback in 1997, but would later be out of print. Plume has also published still-in-print trade paperback editions of Louisiana Power and Light (in 1995), Love Warps the Mind A Little (in 1998) and Deep in the Shade of Paradise (in 2003).

In 1998, Dufresne collaborated with Carl Hiaasen, Dave Barry, Elmore Leonard and nine other South Florida writers on Naked Came the Manatee, a detective novel published by Ballantine Books, a division of Random House.

Dufresne's short story "This is the Age of Beautiful Death" appears in the online journal Blackbird. His essay "To Knit a Knot, Or Knot: A Beginner's Yarn" appears in the anthology Knitting Yarns: Writers on Knitting, published by W. W. Norton & Company in November 2013.

== Plays and screenplays ==
Dufresne's screenplay Freezer Jesus, based on another story in his first short story collection, won in the Grand Valley State University Summer Film Project's 2002 screenwriting contest and was produced that year by the project. The cinematographer, Jack Anderson, has a long list of Hollywood credits. After being selected for several other festivals, it was featured at Saugatuck, Michigan's 2006 Waterfront Film Festival.

Dufresne's play, Trailerville, premiered at the Off-off-Broadway Blue Heron Theatre in 2005.

In the summer of 2007, Grand Valley State University produced the film To Live and Die In Dixie, with a screenplay by Dufresne. Jack Anderson was again hired as cinematographer, with Harper Philbin as director. The film was released in 2008.
