= Barbara Parker (writer) =

American novelist

- Born: January 28, 1947; Columbia, South Carolina, U.S.
- Died: March 7, 2009 (aged 62); Boca Raton, Florida, U.S.
- Education: University of South Florida; University of Miami School of Law; Florida International University
- Occupation: Writer
- Writing career
- Genre: Mystery fiction

Barbara Parker (January 28, 1947 – March 7, 2009) was an American mystery writer. She wrote 12 novels, the first of which, Suspicion of Innocence, was a finalist for the Edgar Allan Poe Award for best first mystery novel by an American author. Parker was on the national board of the Mystery Writers of America and was the chair of its membership committee for two years.

== Biography ==
Parker was born in Columbia, South Carolina, and lived in North Carolina before moving with her family to Florida. There she attended the University of South Florida, majoring in theatre arts, then earned her legal degree at the University of Miami School of Law. Following graduation, she became a prosecutor in the Florida state attorney's office prior to spending eight years running her own legal practice. She wrote an adventure story to entertain her son and to provide an alternative to her legal career. She then left her law practice and took a job as a paralegal with a major law firm to make money while developing her writing career, not telling her employer that she was an attorney. She would write while commuting by bus to downtown Miami.

She attended Florida International University, where her thesis for her master's degree became the genesis for Suspicion of Innocence, her first novel. The novel was a finalist for the Edgar Award for best first mystery novel by an American author and was filmed as Sisters and Other Strangers, presented as an ABC Movie of the Week. Les Standiford, director of the creative writing program at FIU called her "one of my first great students" who "became a wonderful writer. I have always viewed her as a wonderful ambassador for the creating writing program. We are proud to claim her as one of ours."

Her Suspicion series of novels revolved around Miami lawyers Gail Connor and Anthony Quintana, and their experiences in South Florida's changing demographic environment. She researched her books carefully, spending time with ballet dancers and cops, fashion models and rock bands while getting material for her books. A fervent opponent of the Castro regime, she visited Cuba three times, where she brought books to help Cubans establish their own independent library. Her books Suspicion of Deceit and Suspicion of Betrayal were listed on the New York Times Best Seller list.

She died on March 7, 2009, at the Hospice By The Sea in Boca Raton, Florida.

== Selected works ==
Barbara Parker - Florida Suspicion Series

- Suspicion of Innocence (1994)
- Suspicion of Guilt (1995)
- Suspicion of Deceit (1998)
- Suspicion of Betrayal (1999)
- Suspicion of Malice (2000)
- Suspicion of Vengeance (2001)
- Suspicion of Madness (2003)
- Suspicion of Rage (2005)

Other

- Blood Relations (1994)
- Criminal Justice (1997)
- The Perfect Fake (2006)
- The Dark of Day (2008)
- The Reckoning (2009) (unfinished)
