= Edna Buchanan =

American journalist and writer

- Born: Edna Rydzik; March 16, 1939 (age 87); Paterson, New Jersey, U.S.
- Education: Montclair State University
- Occupations: Novelist; non-fiction writer; journalist
- Writing career
- Genres: Memoir, true crime, mystery fiction
- Website: ednabuchanan.com

Edna Buchanan (née Rydzik, born March 16, 1939) is an American journalist and writer who is best known for her crime mystery novels. She won the 1986 Pulitzer Prize for General News Reporting "for her versatile and consistently excellent police beat reporting."

== Early life and education ==
Buchanan was born in Paterson, New Jersey. In high school she worked in a coat factory and after graduating she worked, along with her mother, at a Western Electric plant. She attended Montclair State College, where she took a creative writing course and was encouraged to become a writer. She and her mother took a vacation to Miami Beach and, according to Buchanan, she knew as soon as she walked off the plane that she wanted to leave Paterson.

== Career ==
Buchanan began her career writing for the Miami Beach Sun, covering crime, local politics, society, celebrity interviews and occasionally letters to the editor. In 1973, she began working as a police beat reporter for the Miami Herald. In 1986 she won the Pulitzer Prize in General News Reporting. Buchanan retired from The Miami Herald in 1988 to devote herself to writing novels.

Her book Miami, It's Murder was nominated for an Edgar Award in 1995.

Buchanan's autobiographical book The Corpse Had A Familiar Face inspired two TV movies starring Elizabeth Montgomery: The Corpse Had a Familiar Face (1994) and Deadline for Murder: From the Files of Edna Buchanan (1995), the latter marking Montgomery's final acting role before her death that year. Buchanan's novel Nobody Lives Forever was made into a TV movie in 1998.

Buchanan was embarrassed in 1990 when she was quoted extensively in the book Blue Thunder: How the Mafia Owned and Finally Murdered Cigarette Boat King Donald Aronow, by Thomas Burdick and Charlene Mitchell.

Burdick ... led her to believe that he was seeking only background information, never used a tape recorder or took notes, asked her to hypothesize about people and situations, then quoted her as if she were stating fact.

According to Buchanan, she tried to have her name and the quotes removed from the book after she read the galley proofs, but she was told by the publisher that it was too late.

Buchanan was profiled by Calvin Trillin in a 1986 piece for The New Yorker. The article was included in Trillin's anthologies Killings (1984), American Stories (1991), and The Lede (2024).

Buchanan is featured in the 2018 documentary film The Last Resort.

As of December 2023, Buchanan was living in a nursing home in Homestead.

== Books ==
=== Fiction ===
- Nobody Lives Forever (1990)
- Naked Came the Manatee (Putnam, 1996), by Buchanan and 12 others (Note: Naked Came the Manatee (Putnam, 1996) is a "mystery thriller parody novel" and a serial novel comprising thirteen chapters by 13 South Florida contributors. Buchanan wrote chapter four.)
- Pulse (1998)
- Legally Dead (2008)
- A Dark and Lonely Place (2011)

=== Britt Montero Series ===
- Contents Under Pressure (1992)
- Miami, It's Murder (1994)
- Suitable for Framing (1995)
- Act of Betrayal (1996)
- Margin of Error (1997)
- Garden of Evil (1999)
- You Only Die Twice (2001)
- The Ice Maiden (2002)
- Love Kills (2007)

=== Craig Burch Series ===
- Cold Case Squad (2004)
- Shadows (2005)

=== Nonfiction ===
- Carr, Five Years of Rape and Murder: from the personal account of Robert Frederick Carr III, 1979
- The Corpse Had a Familiar Face: Covering Miami, America's Hottest Beat, 1987
- Never Let Them See You Cry: More from Miami, America's Hottest Beat, 1992
- Vice: Life and Death on the Streets of Miami, 1992
