= James W. Hall =

American writer (born 1947)

James W. Hall (born 1947) is an American author and professor from Florida. He has written twenty-three novels, four books of poetry, a collection of short stories, and a collection of essays.

A longtime professor of literature and creative writing at Florida International University, Hall is perhaps best known for a series of crime/mystery novels starring the character Thorn. A loner who ties flies to catch bonefish, Thorn partners with his private-eye friend Sugarman to thwart a range of villains. Hall's writing often features a South Florida backdrop and explores the contrast between squalor and poverty coexisting with tremendous wealth and glamor.

== Early life, education and family ==
Hall was born in Hopkinsville, Kentucky in 1947. He has a master's degree in creative writing from Johns Hopkins University and a doctorate in literature from the University of Utah. He was a Fulbright professor of literature in Spain.

Hall began his career as a poet. He taught at Florida International University in Miami for 40 years and founded the school's creative writing program in the early 1970s.

His wife's name is Evelyn and they have two Cavalier King Charles Spaniels, Hank and Hazel. They live full time in the mountains of North Carolina.

== Writing highlights ==
His novels include Under Cover of Daylight, Hard Aground, Gone Wild, Buzz Cut, Red Sky at Night, Rough Draft, Off the Chart and Silencer. His collection Hot Damn, consists of personal essays written for the Ft. Lauderdale Sun-Sentinel's Sunshine Magazine, the Washington Post and Miami Herald.

Hall's non-fiction book Hit Lit is about common features of the twelve most commercially successful novels of the last hundred years.

His two short story collections are Paper Products and Over Exposure. Over Exposure includes the short story "The Catch", winner of an Edgar Award. He also won a John D. MacDonald Award for Excellence in Florida Fiction, presented by the JDM Bibliophile.

== Published works ==
=== Thorn P.I. series ===
1. Under Cover of Daylight (1987)
2. Tropical Freeze (1989) published as Squall Line in the UK
3. Mean High Tide (1994)
4. Gone Wild (1995)
5. Buzz Cut (1996)
6. Red Sky At Night (1997)
7. Blackwater Sound (2002)
8. Off the Chart (2003)
9. Magic City (2007)
10. Hell's Bay (2008)
11. Silencer (2010)
12. Dead Last (2011)
13. Going Dark (2013)
14. The Big Finish (2014)
15. Bad Axe (2020)
16. 'Trickster' (2022)
17. 'Stare Down' (2024)

=== Harper McDaniel series ===
1. When They Come for You (2017)
2. When You Can't Stop (2018)

=== Novels ===
- Paper Products (short stories) (1990)
- Bones of Coral (1991)
- Hard Aground (1992)
- Naked Came the Manatee (1997) (with Brian Antoni, Dave Barry, Edna Buchanan, Tananarive Due, Vicki Hendricks, Carl Hiaasen, Elmore Leonard, Paul Levine, Evelyn W Mayerson and Edna Standiford)
- Body Language (1998)
- Rough Draft (2000)
- Forests of the Night (2005)

=== Poetry and short stories ===
- Paper Products (1990)
- False Statements (1986)
- Ham Operator: Poetry and Fiction (1980)
- The Mating Reflex (1980)
- The Lady from the Dark Green Hills (1976)

=== Non-fiction ===
- Hot Damn! (2002)
- Hit Lit: Cracking the Code of the Twentieth Century's Biggest Bestsellers (2012)
