= List of works based on Peter Pan =

Peter Pan, his fellow characters, and the setting of Neverland have appeared in many works since the original books and 1904 play by J. M. Barrie. The earliest were the stage productions of the play, and an adaptation to silent film, done with Barrie's involvement and personal approval. Later works were authorised by Great Ormond Street Hospital, to which Barrie gave the rights to the Peter Pan works; these include adaptations of the main story in both animated and live-action films, musical stage productions, and a sequel novel. In addition, there have been numerous uses of Barrie's characters, settings, and storylines which challenged or took advantage of the changing copyright status of these elements, including reinterpretations, sequels, prequels, and spin-offs in a variety of media, including film, television series, and books.

Adaptations of Peter Pan for public performance have a unique status in UK copyright law: Great Ormond Street Hospital has the right to receive royalties in perpetuity under specific provisions in the Copyright, Designs and Patents Act 1988.

When dramatised, the character of Peter has usually been played by an adult woman. For boys' roles to be played by women is a convention of the pantomime tradition that was popular when the play was first produced, and was necessitated by laws restricting the use of child actors for evening performances. Later adaptations have often followed this example, for reasons that include tradition, the performance demands of the role, and the marketing advantages of "star" actresses. The roles of Captain Hook and George Darling happened to be played by the same actor in the original production, a tradition which has sometimes been continued in later dramatic adaptations.

== Books and other publications ==
=== Original works ===
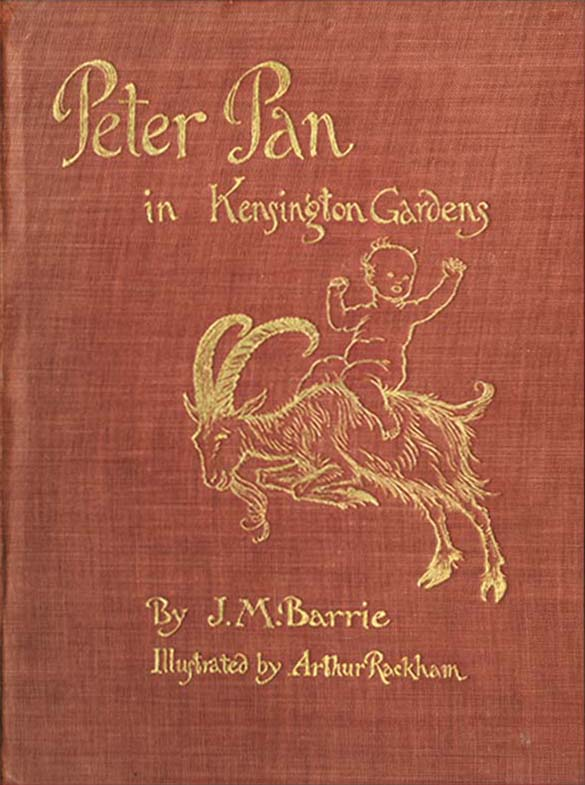
Peter Pan in Kensington Gardens (1906)

- 1904 – Peter Pan, or The Boy Who Wouldn't Grow Up (play): Peter brings Wendy and her brothers to Neverland, where he has a showdown with his nemesis, Captain Hook. After the play was first staged in 1904, Barrie continued to make changes until the script was published officially in 1928. This play was later adapted as a novel by Barrie
- 1906 – Peter Pan in Kensington Gardens: an origin story where the infant Peter flies away from his home, takes up residence in Kensington Gardens and makes friends with the fairies. The story first appeared as a chapter in Barrie's The Little White Bird published in 1902
- 1908 – When Wendy Grew Up – An Afterthought, a short sequel play first staged in 1908, but only published in book form in 1957
- 1911 – Peter and Wendy (novel), later published as Peter Pan and Wendy, adapted as a novel from the play, it also incorporates events from When Wendy Grew Up – An Afterthought
- 1928 – Peter Pan, or The Boy Who Wouldn't Grow Up, the first publication of the script of the play

=== Literary fiction, picture books and other publications ===
Year	Title	Author	Illustrator	Publisher
1907	The Peter Pan Picture Book	Daniel O'Connor	Alice B. Woodward	G. Bell & Sons
1907	Based on the original stage production of 1904. The text was also published as Peter Pan Keepsake but illustrated with photographs from the first productions. It is the first novelisation of the play and also the first illustrated version of the story. This version differs from Barrie's own 1911 novelisation because he had made several changes to his play and story since it was first staged in 1904.			
1915	Peter Pan and Wendy	Retold by May Byron	Mabel Lucie Attwell (1921)	
1915	It was the first time that this form of the title was used, later reused also for Barrie's own novel.			
1987	Peter Pan and the Only Children	Gilbert Adair	Jenny Thorne	Macmillan Children's Books
1987	An unauthorised sequel/prequel novel. This book is written and presented in a format similar to Peter and Wendy, with bound-in colour illustrations. It has Peter living with a different gang of Lost Boys under the ocean, recruiting "only children" who jump from passing ships as new members, including the newest: 10-year-old Marissa Porter. They have adventures under the sea, including a duel with Captain Hook which ends indecisively. The narrator suggests at the end that perhaps this is a prequel to the adventure with Wendy Darling, or they take place without sequence. Adair's previous novel was Alice through the Needle's Eye, a sequel to the Alice in Wonderland stories			
1989	Neverland	Toby Forward		Simon & Schuster
1989	First of the cancelled Neverland series where Peter Pan, Captain Hook etc. are brought back to life through a computer game. Published when Peter Pan first entered the public domain in the UK, before the copyright was revived in 1995			
1991	Hook	Terry Brooks		
1991	A novelization of the Spielberg film			
1999	After the Rain: A New Adventure for Peter Pan	J. E. Somma	Kyle Reed	Daisy Books
1999	An unauthorised sequel novel. Set in modern times, telling of Peter's reaction to a world that has grown to neglect him, and his rescue by three children who teach him that it's OK to grow up. It was published without incident in Canada, where the copyright to Peter Pan was generally agreed to have expired, but Somma and GOSH were in legal dispute when it was published in the U.S. in 2002, where GOSH claimed their copyrights were still valid. They eventually settled out of court.			
2003	Jardines de Kensington	Rodrigo Fresán		SEUIL
2003	Translated into English as "Kensington Gardens". Interweaves the story of Peter Pan, his creator JM Barrie, and various aspects of 1960s London pop culture. The narrator is called "Peter Hook"			
2004	The Lost Girls: A Novel	Laurie Fox		Simon & Schuster
2004	An unauthorised sequel novel. Follows the interaction of Peter Pan with each generation of Wendy Darling's female descendants, up to a distinctly 21st-century great-great-granddaughter.			
2004 - 2011	The Starcatchers books	Dave Barry and Ridley Pearson		Hyperion Books (US), Walker Books (UK)
2004 - 2011	An unauthorised series reboot, Peter and the Starcatchers (2004) Peter and the Shadow Thieves (2006) Peter and the Secret of Rundoon (2007) Peter and the Sword of Mercy (2009) The Bridge to Never Land (2011)			
2006-2008	Never Land Books	Dave Barry, Ridley Pearson	Greg Call	
2006-2008	A series of unauthorised spin-off chapter books. Based on the continuity established by the "Starcatchers" novels, for a younger audience: Escape from the Carnivale (2006), Cave of the Dark Wind (2007), Blood Tide (2008)			
2005	Capt. Hook: The Adventures of a Notorious Youth	James V. Hart	Brett Helquist	HarperCollins (US)
2005	An authorised (non-canon) prequel illustrated novel. Details the history of 15-year-old James Matthew, young Oppidan Scholar and future Captain Hook. The book portrays the villainous youth in a sympathetic light			
2005, 2007	Disney Fairies	Gail Carson Levine	David Christiana	Disney Press (US), HarperCollins (UK)
2005, 2007	A series of spin-off illustrated novels for children. Part of the Disney Fairies franchise, introduces a new cast of "Never Fairies", in addition to Tinker Bell. Peter Pan and Captain Hook are mentioned but play very minor roles. Additional chapter books in the series are intended for younger readers, and were written by various authors, focusing on the different characters invented by Levine: Fairy Dust and the Quest for the Egg (2005), Fairy Haven and the Quest for the Wand (2007)			
2006	Peter Pan in Scarlet	Geraldine McCaughrean		Oxford University Press (UK) and Margaret K McElderry (Simon & Schuster) (US)
2006	The official sequel novel, commissioned by Great Ormond Street Hospital, following a competition launched in 2004. It has been sold in 40 different editions in 37 languages.			
2008	Tigerheart	Peter David		Del Rey Books
2008	Transplanting facsimiles of J. M. Barrie's characters into a parallel universe setting. A novel retelling the Peter Pan stories from another character's perspective, referring to him as "the boy" throughout the novel, and referencing both Peter Pan in Kensington Gardens and Peter and Wendy, with changes to many of the original characters.			
2009	The Child Thief	Gerald Brom	Gerald Brom	HarperCollins
2009	A new adult illustrated novel reinterpreting Peter Pan based on the darker themes in the story as a ruthless figure recruiting children to serve toward his own ends			
2010	Another Pan	Daniel Nayeri and Dina Nayeri		Candlewick Press
2010	A darker version featuring an adult Peter Pan searching for the magic bone dust so he will never grow old. Characters include Wendy, John and their father George Darling			
2011	Always Neverland	Zoe Barton		Harpercollins Children's Books
2011	Ashley is to be another in a long series of "Wendy girls" Peter brings to Neverland, but she is more interested in adventuring			
2013	Tiger Lily	Jodi Lynn Anderson		Orchard Books
2013	The story of fifteen-year-old Tiger Lily who becomes enthralled and entangled in the life of Peter Pan, told from the perspective of Tinker Bell			
2014	Alias Hook	Lisa Jensen		Snowbooks
2014	Captain Hook is caught in an endless loop of warring with Peter Pan until a woman named Stella Parrish dreams her way into Neverland and begins to change things			
2014, 2015	Hook's Revenge Series	Heidi Schulz	John Hendrix	Disney Publishing Worldwide
2014, 2015	A humorous adventure series about the 12-year-old daughter of Captain Hook on a quest to avenge her father's death: Hook's Revenge (2014), The Pirate Code (2015)			
2014	Lost: a Never novella	C. S. R. Calloway		CSRC Storytelling
2014	An unofficial interquel set between Peter, Wendy and Hook.			
2015	Lost Boi	Sassafras Lowrey		Arsenal Pulp Press
2015	A novel for adults retelling the story through the lens of homeless queer youth with prominent BDSM themes. Told from the point of view of Tootles, "Pan's best boi"			
2015	Never Never	Brianna R. Shrum		Spencer Hill Press
2015	An alternate history origin of James Hook and his rivalry with Peter, back when they were both Lost Boys in Neverland.			
2016	All Darling Children	Katrina Monroe		Red Adept Publishing
2016	A young adult re-telling told from the perspective of Madge Darling; Wendy Darling's teenage granddaughter.			
2016	Everland	Wendy Spinale		Scholastic Press
2016	First of the young adult Everland tetralogy transplanting facsimiles of J. M. Barrie's characters into a parallel universe setting. This steampunk or dieselpunk retelling set in an alternate history version of the Blitz, where Gwen's sister Joanna is kidnapped by Hook and his Marauders			
2016	The Neverland Wars	Audrey Greathouse		Clean Teen Publishing
2016	First of The Neverland Wars trilogy where an outside worldly organisation goes to war with Neverland. Sixteen-year-old Gwen is caught up in a looming war in Neverland.			
2016	Unhooked	Lisa Maxwell		Simon Pulse
2016	Gwendolyn's mother's fears are proven right when shadowy creatures kidnap her and her best friend Olivia to a terrifying place to Neverland, where Peter Pan and Hook compete for her trust.			
2016, 2018	Never Ever Series	Sara Saedi		Viking Children's Books
2016, 2018	Loosely based on Peter Pan. Wylie meets Phinn in a club and he whisks her and her brother off to a magical island where no one ages past seventeen: Never Ever (2016), The Lost Kids (2018)			
2017	Hook' s Tale: Being the Account of an Unjustly Villainized Pirate Written by Himself	John Pielmeier		Scribner
2017	The story from Captain Hook’s perspective.			
2017	Lost Boy	Christina Henry		Berkley Books
2017	In Neverland, Jamie, one of Peter Pan's Lost Boys, grows disenchanted with his leader.			
2017	You Can Fly: A Sequel to the Peter Pan Tales	Chuck Rosenthal		Whitepoint Press
2017	On the eve of his thirteenth birthday, Thomas Pandora discovers the truth about his family legacy.			
2019	Forever Neverland	Susan Adrian		Random House USA Children's Books
2019	A contemporary sequel to J. M. Barrie's timeless classic featuring the great-great-grandchildren of Wendy Darling			
2020	Dead Lies Dreaming: Book 1 of the New Management, A new adventure begins in the world of the Laundry Files	Charles Stross		Orbit Books
2020	A pastiche of Peter and Wendy, taking place in Stross' Laundry Files setting. It is first in the Tales of the New Management trilogy			
2020	Neverland: A Fantasy Role-playing Setting	Andrew Kolb	Andrew Kolb	Andrews McMeel Publishing
2020	Straight on Till Morning	Liz Braswell		Disney
2020	Four years after her original adventure, 16-year-old Wendy joins with Tinker Bell in rescuing Peter from Hook. Part of the Twisted Tale Series from the Disney Book Group			
2021, 2025	Son of Neverland Series	Cal Barnes		Magic Hour Press
2021, 2025	An epic fantasy series taking place exactly one hundred years after Peter Pan and Hook's final battle, where Peter must leave childhood behind and evolve into the god he was meant to be to save Neverland from the Dark Father of Time, and further, the entire Universe: Son of Neverland (2021), Son of Neverland and the Kingdom of Time (2025)			
2021	Wendy Darling	A. C. Wise		Titan Books
2021	Sequel novel			
2022	Hooked	A. C. Wise		Titan Books
2023	Saving Neverland	Abi Elphinstone	Geraldine Rodriguez	Puffin
2023	A contemporary sequel featuring the newest residents to 12 Darlington Street Road, the old address of Wendy Darling who encounter Peter Pan			
2024	These Deathless Shores	P. H. Low		Angry Robot
2024	A gender bending origin tale to Captain Hook featuring Malaysian-coded main characters			

=== Comics ===
- Disney produced picture book and comic book adaptations of the story, based on their 1953 animated version, published by Dell Comics and Gold Key
- Peter Pank by Spanish cartoonist "Max" (Francesc Capdevila) (1985–1990), an unauthorised comic reinterpretation for "adults only". Peter is a violent, spiked-hair anarchist living in Punkland with a gang of punk Lost Boys. The pirates are a gang of rockers, the Indians are hippies, and the female characters are often depicted bare-breasted, with numerous sexual scenes. It was published in three albums: Peter Pank, El Licantropunk, and Pankdinista
- Peter Pan by French cartoonist Régis Loisel (1990–2004), an unauthorised prequel bandes dessinées. A bawdy, violent series of six albums (two of which won the Angoulême Audience Award), giving Peter Pan's back story a distinctly Dickensian flavour
- Peter Pan: Return to Never-Never Land by Ron Fortier and Gary Kato (1991), an unauthorised sequel. Peter brings two modern African-American boys to Never-Never Land, published by Malibu Comics under the Adventure Comics imprint, two issues later reprinted in a single volume
- The Lost by Marc Andreyko, Galen Showman, and Jay Geldhof (1997), an unauthorised sequel comic book. This urban horror-themed mini-series published by Caliber Comics and Chaos! Comics continues the story in present-day New York City, with Peter revealed as a vampire boy hustler who leads a small group of vampire boys including Michael, and lures another girl named Wendy to join them
- Lost Boys (ロストボーイズ) by Kaname Itsuki (2004), an unauthorised manga reinterpretation, in which a character based on Peter Pan brings a young man to Neverland to be his father, with romantic themes
- Japanese manga artist, Mayu Sakai, appropriated the English version of the term, puer aeternus, for her series, Peter Pan Syndrome
- Lost Girls by Alan Moore and Melinda Gebbie (July 2006), an unauthorised reinterpretation graphic novel. A controversial use of Wendy Darling alongside Dorothy Gale from The Wonderful Wizard of Oz and Alice from Alice's Adventures in Wonderland in 1913, telling each other stories about their sexual experiences. In it, Peter is a boy that Wendy and her brothers meet in Kensington Gardens, who gives them their first sexual experiences
- Peter Panzerfaust by Kurtis J. Wiebe (2012 – 2016), a retelling of the story of Peter Pan, set in France during World War II. Peter, an American boy looking for his past in France at the outbreak of the Second World War, recruiting several orphans (The Lost Boys), saving the Darling children and coming across SS-Hauptmann/Kapitan Haken
- Marvel Fairy Tales by C. B. Cebulski features various Marvel Comics characters as characters from fairy tales and fables. In issue #1 of the third miniseries of the line, Peter Pan is played by Captain America, with Scarlet Witch as Wendy, The Wasp as Tinker Bell, and Klaw as Captain Hook
- Peter Pan – The Graphic Novel by Stephen White (2015), a retelling of the original work in graphic novel form
- Cheshire Crossing written by Andy Weir, a comic which takes characters and locations from Peter Pan as well as from The Wonderful Wizard of Oz and Alice's Adventures in Wonderland
- Peter Pan: The Graphic Novel Sequel by Andy Winter and Keara Norris (2024), an unofficial sequel to J.M. Barrie's classic, set an unspecified number of years after Captain Hook's death. "A radical new take on Peter Pan in a wild sequel full of action, magic, and punk rock."

=== Non-fiction ===
- Fifty Years of Peter Pan by Roger Lancelyn Green is an account of the first 50 years in Peter Pan's stage history
- J.M. Barrie and The Lost Boys by Andrew Birkin is an account of the meeting and relationship between Barrie and the Llewelyn Davies family, and how Peter Pan came to be created, based on his docudrama The Lost Boys broadcast in 1978
- Dr. Dan Kiley popularised the Peter Pan syndrome in his 1983 book, The Peter Pan Syndrome: Men Who Have Never Grown Up, about individuals (usually male) with underdeveloped maturity; his next book, The Wendy Dilemma (1984), advises women romantically involved with "Peter Pans" how to improve their relationships
- Peter Pan on Stage and Screen, 1904–2010 by Bruce Hanson covers the genesis of Peter Pan and its productions in the UK and US; updated edition of Hanson's work The Peter Pan Chronicles, published in 1993

== Radio ==
- Peter Pan, book, music, and lyrics by Philip Glassborow (1995), an authorised musical radio adaptation. Directed by Dirk Maggs for the BBC, this production was nominated for a Writer's Guild of Great Britain award

== Stage ==
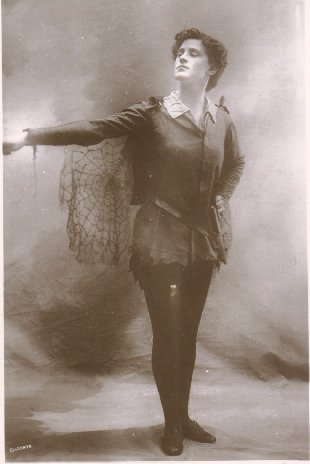
Zena Dare as Peter, 1907

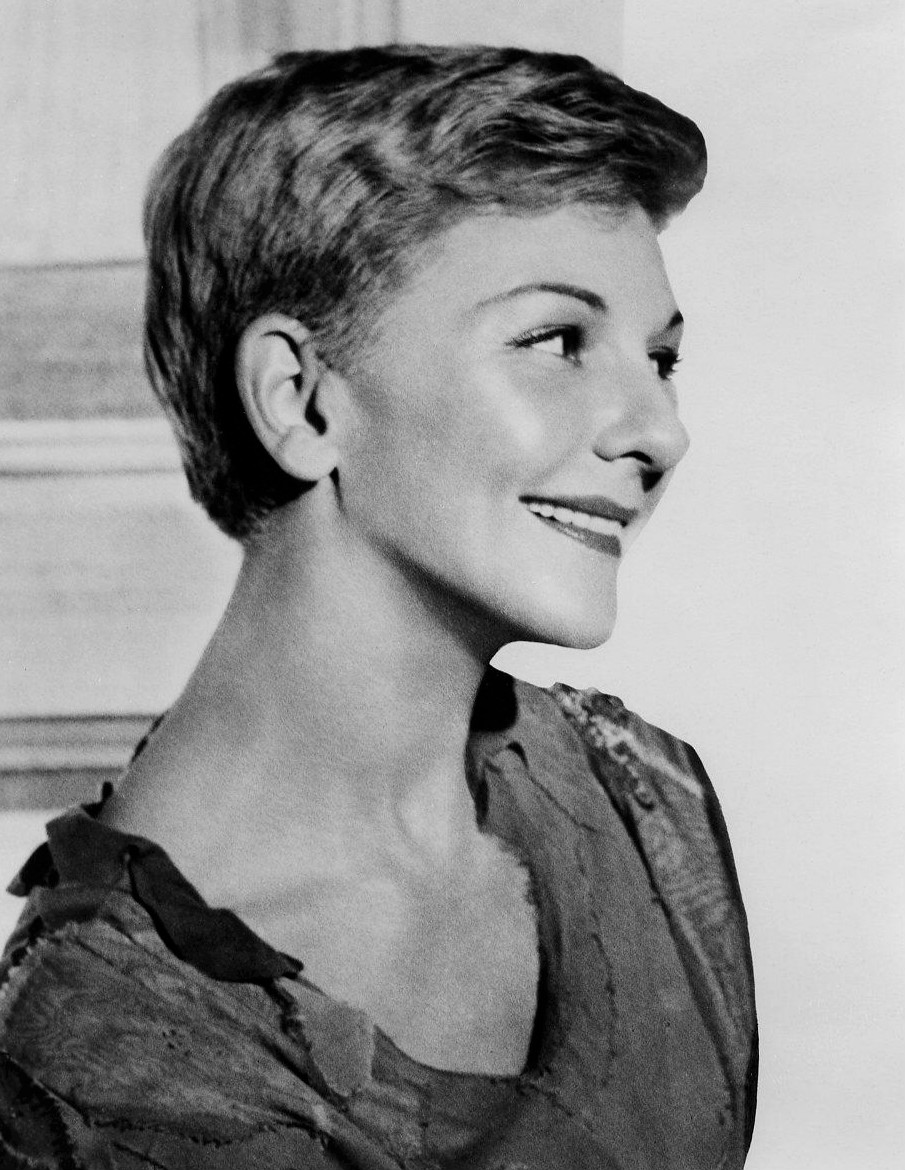
Mary Martin as Peter

- Peter Pan, or The Boy Who Wouldn't Grow Up (1904). Although Barrie did not intend the play as a pantomime, it has many features in common with this traditional genre of British children's theatre: a boy – played by a woman – as the lead role (known as the "principal boy"), actors in animal costumes, a flamboyant villain, and fantasy themes
- Peter Pan (1950), music and lyrics by Leonard Bernstein, an authorised Broadway adaptation. Intended as a musical, it was eventually staged as a "straight" dramatic version with only five songs. This version starred Jean Arthur as Peter Pan, and Boris Karloff in the dual roles of Mr. Darling and Captain Hook
- Peter Pan (1954), directed by Jerome Robbins, an authorised musical stage adaptation with music by Mark "Moose" Charlap and lyrics by Carolyn Leigh. Taking the opposite path of the 1950 adaptation, it was originally to have only a few incidental songs, but evolved into a full Broadway musical with some new songs from composer Jule Styne and lyricists Betty Comden and Adolph Green. This version became widely known as a vehicle for Mary Martin, who appeared in three television productions of this version and won a Best Musical Actress Tony Award for her performance as well as an Emmy when it was aired on television. Cyril Ritchard won a Tony as Captain Hook in the Broadway production opposite Martin and reprised the role in the first television production opposite her, and it is the role for which he has remained best known. Revivals featured television actress Sandy Duncan and gymnast Cathy Rigby as Peter. A 2014 TV version was broadcast by NBC as Peter Pan Live!
- Neverland (1975), book, music, and lyrics by Jim Steinman, a futuristic musical stage adaptation. Although it only existed as a brief workshop at the Kennedy Center in 1977, three of the songs would be reworked for the album Bat Out of Hell, one of the best-selling recordings in history Other songs appeared on Steinman's 1981 solo album Bad for Good.
- Peter Pan (1982), an adaptation by John Caird and Trevor Nunn, first staged on 10 December 1982 at the Barbican Theatre, London
- Peter Pan: The British Musical (1985), book, music and lyrics by Piers Chater Robinson, an authorised musical stage adaptation
- Peter Pan (1996), book, music, and lyrics by Philip Glassborow, an authorised musical stage adaptation based on Glassborow's radio musical
- Peter Pan: A Musical Adventure (1996), lyrics by Anthony Drewe and music by George Stiles, an authorised musical stage adaptation, first staged in Copenhagen. Performed and recorded at the Royal Albert Hall, and broadcast on New Year's Eve 2001 by the BBC
- Peter and Wendy (1997) adaptation and lyrics by Liza Lorwin and music by Scottish fiddler, Johnny Cunningham (of Silly Wizard fame). This is a stage production using Bunraku-style puppets performed by avant-garde theatre troupe, Mabou Mines, and actress Karen Kandel, who won an OBIE for her performance. Mabou Mimes recently revived the original production at the Edinburgh Festival (2009) and in New York at the New Victory Theater (2011)
- The Terrible Tragedy of Peter Pan (2002) by Phillip C. Klapperich, an ensemble member of The House Theatre of Chicago. This production brings to the fore the darker subtexts of the story, such as the dysfunction of Peter's relationships with Wendy, Tinker Bell, and Tiger Lily, his fear of growing up, and his self-absorption, as he fails to notice those around him being hurt or killed
- Peter Pan (2004) by the Chickenshed Theatre Company was a musical stage version of Peter Pan, and was performed to mark the 100th Anniversary of the play. This is also the only performance to date with sign language fully integrated
- Peter Pan (2009), originally titled "Peter Pan in Kensington Gardens" a large scale production for which a specially built theatre pavilion with 360 degree surround video was created; script by Tanya Ronder, music by Benjamin Wallfisch, first staged at Kensington Gardens in Summer 2009. The production opened in the US in May 2010 and has since toured in San Francisco, Orange County, Atlanta, Chicago and Boston
- Peter Pan (A Play) (2009), adapted by Amanda Dehnert, first staged at Northwestern University, later mounted professionally at Chicago's Lookingglass Theatre Company in 2010
- Peter Pan (2009), music by Dan Chambers and lyrics by Dan Chambers and Polly Gibson, book by Polly Gibson, an authorised musical stage adaptation, first staged by the Sinodun Players at the Corn Exchange, Wallingford in July 2009
- Peter Pan (2010), stage adaptation by David Greig, first staged by the National Theatre of Scotland at the King's Theatre, Glasgow in April 2010. The action is transposed from Edwardian London to Victorian Edinburgh, and set against a background of construction of the Forth Rail Bridge
- Peter Pan (2010), ballet with score by Philip Norman and choreography by Russell Kerr, first staged by the Royal New Zealand Ballet in 2010.
- Peter Pan, the Boy who Hated Mothers (2010), adapted by Andrew Birkin from J.M. Barrie's original various drafts of the play, novel and screenplay, first staged at the Theatre du Gymnase in Marseille in February 2010 (translated into French by Céline-Albin Faivre), broadcast on Arte TV Channel Christmas 2010
- Peter Pan (2012), stage adaptation directed by Sally Cookson and devised by the companies, originally produced by Bristol Old Vic for Christmas 2012 before being produced by the National Theatre, London (in a co-production with Bristol Old Vic) for Christmas 2016 and the Troubadour White City Theatre for summer 2019
- Disney's Peter Pan Jr is a one-hour children's musical based on the Disney Peter Pan movie with some updated material. It became available for school and children's theatre productions in 2013 after several pilot productions
- Wendy and Peter Pan (2013), a new adaptation by Ella Hickson at the Royal Shakespeare Company in England, placing Wendy as the protagonist
- Peter Pan Goes Wrong (2013), is a comedy by Henry Lewis, Jonathan Sayer and Henry Shields of the Mischief Theatre Company in which the characters and members of the fictitious Cornley Polytechnic Drama Society attempt to present their production of Peter Pan
- Fly (2013), a darker take on Peter Pan with a focus on leaving childhood behind and the importance of growing up, by Jeffrey Seller debuted through the Dallas Theater Center. The book is by Rajiv Joseph, who worked on the lyrics with Kirsten Childs, and the music is by Bill Sherman
- Peter Pan Opera (2014), by composer Richard Ayres and librettist Lavinia Greenlaw, first staged in Stuttgart in 2014 and performed in the UK in 2015 by the Welsh National Opera
- Peter Pan (2015), an adaptation presented at Regent's Park Open Air Theatre. Co-directed by Timothy Sheader and Liam Steel, the production was set in World War I. The production earned an Olivier Award nomination and returned to the Open Air Theatre for its 2018 Season
- For Peter Pan on Her 70th Birthday (2017), an adaptation by Sarah Ruhl, in which the title character and her siblings, all elderly retirees, become the characters of the original play. Beginning 18 August 2017 in New York City, it ran at Playwrights Horizons
- Peter Pan and Wendy (2019), a feminist version of the story with Wendy in an equal role. It was commissioned from Lauren Gunderson by the Shakespeare Theatre Company of Washington, D.C. Critics described it as "all about girl power."
- Peter Pan: reimagined (2019), an adaptation conceived and directed by Liam Steel, adapted by Georgia Christou and Liam Steel for the Birmingham Repertory Theatre which changes Edwardian London to present-day Birmingham
- Peter Pan (2023), an adaptation by Roddy Doyle set in early 20th century Dublin and directed by Ned Bennett for the Gate Theatre, Dublin. In a gender reversal of tradition, the actor who plays plays Mary Darling, Clare Dunne, also plays Captain Hook.

== Film ==
=== Live-action ===
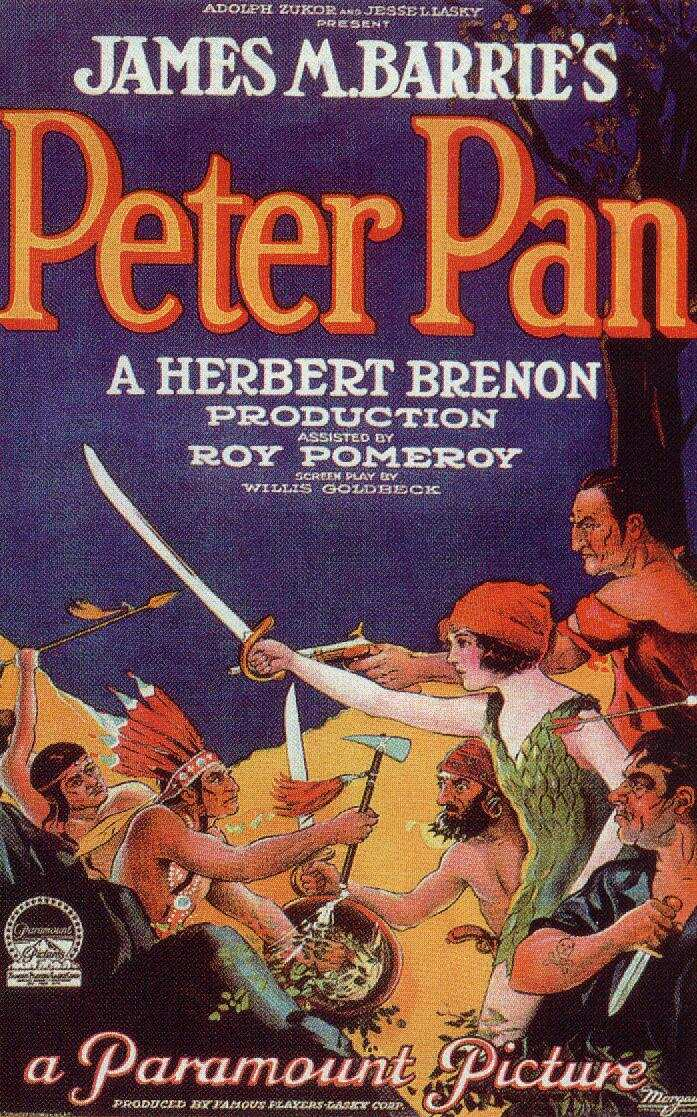
Peter Pan (1924) movie poster

- Peter Pan (1924), an authorised silent movie adaptation by Paramount Pictures. It stars Betty Bronson as Peter Pan, Ernest Torrence as Captain Hook, Mary Brian as Wendy Darling, and Virginia Brown Faire as Tinker Bell. Barrie was involved in this production and wrote a screenplay for it, but Paramount instead used the original stage script, taking dialogue from it for the intertitles
- Peter Pan (Питер Пэн, 1987), an unauthorised live-action musical adaptation by Belarusfilm for Soviet television
- Hook (1991), an authorised live-action sequel directed by Steven Spielberg. A family action/adventure film starring Robin Williams, Dustin Hoffman, Julia Roberts, Bob Hoskins and Maggie Smith. This film deviates in a significant way from Barrie's source material in that it tells the story of a Peter Pan who chose to grow up and not return to Neverland to become a father having fallen in love (during a visit to Wendy's House in London) with Wendy's granddaughter Moira who later became his wife. Pan took on a new life and became Peter Banning, an unimaginative and work-obsessed lawyer who has a strained relationship with his family including his two children, Maggie and Jack. Peter is lured back to Neverland by his old enemy Captain Hook who has kidnapped both Maggie and Jack in an attempt to rediscover meaning in his life and force Peter to give him the war he has long craved for, whilst also attempting to turn Peters' own children against their father in the process. Despite mixed reviews by critics, the film was popular with audiences and grossed nearly $120 million in the U.S., making it the 4th highest-grossing movie of 1991.
- Peter Pan (2003), an authorised live-action movie adaptation directed by P. J. Hogan. This version is notable for its directness in addressing the romantic elements between Peter (Jeremy Sumpter) and Wendy (Rachel Hurd-Wood). Captain Hook is portrayed by Jason Isaacs (who also plays the role of Mr. Darling), and Tinker Bell is played by Ludivine Sagnier. The $100 million film boasted state-of-the-art special effects by ILM and took nearly a year to produce in Australia, but was not a financial success for Universal Studios (USA/France/English countries) and Columbia Pictures
- Neverland (2003), an unauthorised film reinterpretation by writer/director Damion Dietz. Set in early 21st-century Los Angeles and heavily "updated" for this setting, Dietz's independently produced film—featuring Wil Wheaton as John Darling—maintains much of the characterisation, plot and themes of Barrie's original story
- Pan (2015), an origin story directed by Joe Wright starring Levi Miller as Pan, Garrett Hedlund as Hook, Hugh Jackman as Blackbeard, Rooney Mara as Tiger Lily, Adeel Akhtar as Smee, Nonso Anozie as Bishop and Amanda Seyfried as Mary.
- Wendy (2020), a live-action reimagining from Wendy's perspective, directed by Benh Zeitlin featuring Devin France as the titled character, with Yashua Mack as Peter, Krzysztof Meyn as Thomas and Gage and Gavin Naquin as Douglas and James Darling.
- Come Away (2020), a film that portrays Peter Pan as the brother of Alice from Lewis Carroll's story of Alice's Adventures in Wonderland portrayed by Keira Chansa. The cast includes Jordan Nash as Peter, as well as Angelina Jolie, David Oyelowo, with David Gyasi as Captain Hook and Gugu Mbatha-Raw as Alice Darling
- Peter Pan & Wendy (2023), a live-action adaptation of the 1953 Disney movie directed by David Lowery and written by him and Toby Halbrooks; starring Alexander Molony and Ever Anderson as the title characters Peter Pan and Wendy Darling, Jude Law as Captain Hook, Yara Shahidi as Tinker Bell and Alyssa Wapanatahk as Tiger Lily.
- Peter Pan's Neverland Nightmare (2025), a horror reimagining of the story that was written and directed by Scott Jeffrey and produced by Rhys Frake-Waterfield, who helmed Winnie-the-Pooh: Blood and Honey and is set in the same universe, featuring Martin Portlock as Peter Pan, Megan Placito as Wendy Darling, Peter DeSouza-Feighoney as Michael Darling, Kit Green as Tinker Bell, and Charity Kase as Captain Hook.

=== Animation ===
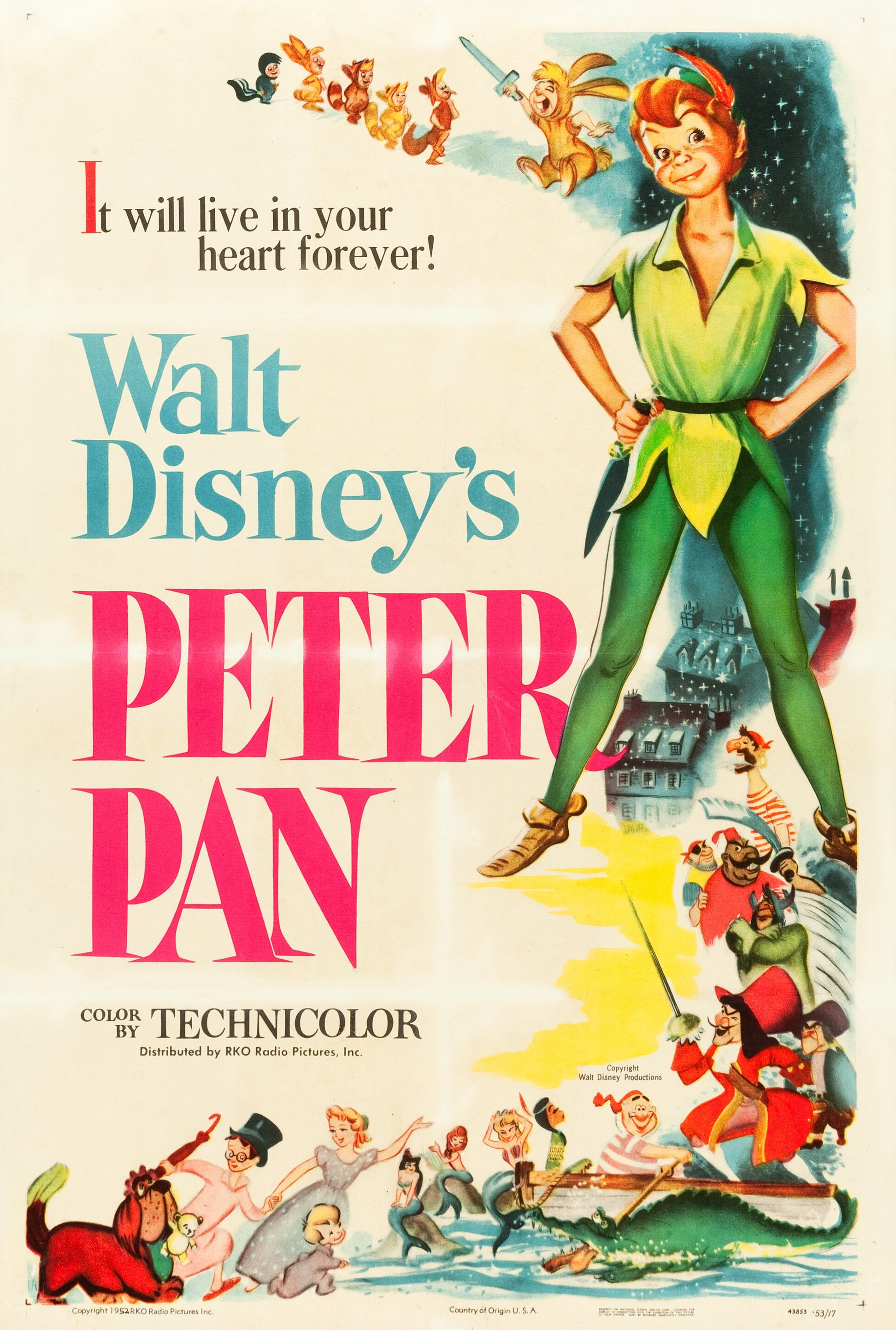
Peter Pan (1953)

- Walt Disney's Peter Pan (1953), an authorised animated adaptation. Disney licensed the film rights to the story in 1939 from Great Ormond Street Hospital for Children. It featured music by Sammy Cahn, Frank Churchill, Sammy Fain, and Ted Sears. 15-year-old film actor Bobby Driscoll supplied the voice of Peter, while Wendy was portrayed by Kathryn Beaumont, who previously portrayed Alice in Alice in Wonderland. Hook was portrayed by Hans Conried (who also played Mr. Darling), and Margaret Kerry did live-action references for Tinker Bell. This version contained little of the original dialogue from the play or its novelisation.
- Peter Pan (1988), an unauthorised Australian direct-to-video animated adaptation
- Return to Never Land from Disney (2002), an authorised animated sequel to the 1953 Disney film. Wendy's daughter Jane becomes involved with Peter Pan. The movie takes place during World War II, set amidst the Blitz (1940), and deals with the issue of children being forced to grow up too fast.
- Peter Pan: The Quest for the Never Book (2018), an adaptation film of The New Adventures of Peter Pan.
- In Chip 'n Dale: Rescue Rangers (2022), Will Arnett voiced a version of Peter Pan called Sweet Pete, the "actor" who played the character in the 1953 film, who became a crime boss after being fired by Disney due to his age. He goes after Chip and Dale for discovering his plans, serving as the main antagonist of this film.

== Television ==
=== Live-action ===
- Producers' Showcase: Peter Pan (7 March 1955). The 1954 stage version was re-staged for television by NBC as part of its monthly high-quality anthology series Producers' Showcase and broadcast as a historic, live color television event. The production was so well received that Producers' Showcase produced a second live presentation on 9 January 1956, with the same cast. Mary Martin played TV's Peter Pan for the third time on 8 December 1960 with many of the same cast members, and this version of the 1954 musical was recorded on color videotape, and repeated in 1963, 1966, and 1973. It was presented by NBC as a stand-alone special program rather than as part of Producers' Showcase. After 1973, it was presumed lost and not broadcast again until March 1989, after which it eventually appeared a few times on the Disney Channel. It was also released on videocassette and briefly on DVD. In 2000, the Cathy Rigby stage production, featuring almost all of the songs used in the 1954 version, was telecast by the A&E Network and issued on DVD
- Hallmark Hall of Fame: Peter Pan (12 December 1976). A new TV musical production was broadcast on NBC. It starred Mia Farrow as Peter and Danny Kaye as Captain Hook. It had a new score, with music and lyrics by Anthony Newley and Leslie Bricusse, but did not achieve the success or the popularity that the Mary Martin version had. The screenplay was by Andrew Birkin, who went on to write and direct The Lost Boys, a docudrama for the BBC about Barrie and the Llewelyn Davies boys
- Neverland on Syfy Channel and Sky Movies (December 2011), a two-part miniseries that re-imagines the origins of Peter Pan prior to his adventures with Wendy. Here, he (and his friends who would become the Lost Boys) is depicted as being an orphaned pickpocket who was taken in by expert thief and former arms dealer James "Jimmy" Hook as an infant. Directed by Nick Willing, the cast includes Charlie Rowe as Peter Pan, Rhys Ifans as James Hook, Bob Hoskins as Smee, Anna Friel as Captain Elizabeth Bonny, Charles Dance as Dr. Richard Fludd, Lorn Macdonald as Fox and Keira Knightley as the voice of Tinker Bell
- The New Adventures of Peter and Wendy (2014 – 2017), webseries that features Wendy as the main character through a series of vlogs and other media
- Peter Pan Live! is a new production of the 1954 version broadcast live on NBC on 4 December 2014 starring Allison Williams as Peter, Christopher Walken as Captain Hook, Kelli O'Hara as Mrs. Darling, Christian Borle as Mr. Darling/Mr. Smee and Minnie Driver as the adult Wendy. Critical reaction was mixed, with many critics expressing relief that the broadcast was not a disaster
- Peter and Wendy (2015), a two-hour drama based on J M Barrie's novel first aired on ITV on 26 December 2015, produced by Headline Pictures, set in Great Ormond Street Hospital in which a child patient slips into a fantasy world resembling Neverland during an operation. With Stanley Tucci as Captain Hook, Paloma Faith as Tinker Bell, Laura Fraser as Mrs Darling, Woody Norman as Curly, Hazel Doupe as Wendy and Zac Sutcliffe as Peter
- Peter Pan Goes Wrong (2016), a one-hour television adaptation of Mischief Theatre's play of the same name in which the fictitious Cornley Polytechnic Drama Society attempt to stage a production of Peter Pan, starring the original cast and guest appearance from David Suchet as the narrator
- Once Upon a Time is an ABC television series that involves characters from familiar works of fiction, including Peter Pan. Colin O'Donoghue was a series regular in the role of Hook, who originated as Killian Jones. Freya Tingley first played Wendy in the 21st episode of the second season and continued playing the role in a few episodes towards the end of Season 3A. Robbie Kay played the main villain role during Season 3A as Peter Pan, portrayed in the series as the father of Rumpelstiltskin, and reprised his role in a couple episodes during Season 5B and the second-to-last episode of the overall show. Rose McIver played Tinker Bell during the majority of Season 3A, then one episode during Season 3B and one during Season 6.

=== Animation ===
- Peter Pan: The Animated Series (romanised as "Pîtâ Pan no Bôken") by Nippon Animation (1989), an anime television series. Produced as part of Nippon's World Masterpiece Theater series, the first 23 episodes are a loose adaptation of Barrie's story, while the latter half introduces a completely original arc with new supporting characters
- Fox's Peter Pan & the Pirates on Fox Kids (1990), an animated TV series based on Barrie's novel, presenting the Darling children's other adventures in the Neverland during their stay. The series also focuses on significant development of the pirates as less one-dimensional characters. Voice talents in the cast included Jason Marsden as Peter and Tim Curry as "Captain James T. Hook"; Curry won an Emmy for it
- A series of digitally animated direct-to-DVD films starring Tinker Bell was begun by Disney in 2008. These works are part of the company's Disney Fairies franchise, and feature a cast of fairy characters and settings original to Disney.
  - Tinker Bell (2008)
  - Tinker Bell and the Lost Treasure (2009)
  - Tinker Bell and the Great Fairy Rescue (2010)
  - Pixie Hollow Games (TV special, 2011)
  - Secret of the Wings (2012)
  - The Pirate Fairy (2014)
  - Tinker Bell and the Legend of the NeverBeast (2015)
- Jake and the Never Land Pirates (2011–2016), an Annie Award-winning musical interactive animated Disney Junior show based on the successful Disney franchise, Peter Pan. The series focuses on a band of young pirates consisting of Jake, Izzy, Cubby, and their parrot Skully, who continuously spend their days competing against Captain Hook and Mr. Smee for treasure.
- The New Adventures of Peter Pan (2012–2016) is a series of CGI animation French-German-Indian produced by the DQ Entertainment and Method Animation.

== Video games ==
- Peter Pan, a 1984 video game published by Hodder & Stoughton
- Peter Pan and the Pirates, a 1991 side-scrolling game for the Nintendo Entertainment System, based on the TV series
- Hook, a set of four 1992 games based on the film. One was an arcade fight game, two were side-scrolling games for Nintendo and Sega consoles, and the fourth was an adventure game for home computers
- Peter Pan: A Story Painting Adventure, a 1993 point and click adventure game for MS-DOS
- Peter Pan: Return to Neverland, two 2002 games based on Disney's film, one for the Game Boy Advance, the other for PlayStation
- Kingdom Hearts, a franchise between Square-Enix and Disney on various game systems that features Neverland as a playable world inhabited with various characters from the Peter Pan books and films including Peter Pan, Wendy, Tinker Bell, Captain Hook, Mr. Smee, Cubby, and Slightly.
- Disney has released two video games as part of the Disney Fairies franchise, for the Nintendo DS, each a tie-in with a direct-to-DVD feature film of the same name:
  - Tinker Bell (2008)
  - Tinker Bell and the Lost Treasure (2009)
  - Tinker Bell and the Great Fairy Rescue (2010)
- Disney Infinity 2.0, Tinker Bell is a playable character in the game's Toy Box mode. She has been given powers to fly, and use her fairy dust to defeat enemies
- Disney Magic Kingdoms, includes as playable characters some of the characters from the 1953 animated film in new storylines placed after the events of the film

== Biographical dramas ==
- The Lost Boys, a 1978 docudrama produced by the BBC, written by Andrew Birkin, starring Ian Holm, tells about the relationship between Barrie and the Llewelyn Davies boys and the development of Peter Pan
- Finding Neverland, a 2004 film starring Johnny Depp as Barrie and Kate Winslet as Sylvia Llewelyn Davies is a fictionalised account of their relationship and how it led to the creation of Peter Pan. It was based on the 1998 play The Man Who Was Peter Pan by Allan Knee. In 2015, it was adapted into a musical on Broadway, playing at the Lunt-Fontanne Theatre

== References in other works ==
- In 1980, Petula Clark starred in Never, Never Land as a woman whose niece, captivated by Barrie's tale, runs away with her younger cousin and takes refuge with a group of "lost boys" squatting in a deserted London townhouse
- In the 1986 Spanish film El río de oro (The Golden River) by Jaime Chávarri, the central character is a man named Peter whose wife Dubarry played the role of Tinker Bell in a theater play some years ago. They had a son, but Peter killed the baby when he was only 3 months old because he thought the boy was growing up too fast
- The plot of the 1990 novel An Awfully Big Adventure by Beryl Bainbridge (made into a film in 1995) revolves around a production of the play
- The 2002 novel The League of Heroes by Xavier Mauméjean is set in an alternate universe in which Neverland has materialized in Kensington Gardens. The fairy folk are commonplace in London, as are pirates and Indians. Peter Pan is considered one of several enemies of the repressive government and is pursued by the League whose members include Lord Admiral Hook (Captain Hook), Sherlock Holmes, and Lord Greystoke (Tarzan)
- In a season 2 episode of the Disney Channel sitcom Wizards of Waverly Place called "Fairy Tale", Justin Russo directs a school play of Peter Pan, with Zeke Beakerman cast as Peter Pan and Harper Finkle cast as Tinker Bell (she's later replaced by Alex Russo after falling off the stage)
- Singer/songwriter S. J. Tucker has released three songs called The Wendy Trilogy, chronicling how Wendy joined Captain Hook's crew, dueled him for command, gained great fame in Neverland and beyond, and eventually returned home, passing her legacy on
- The song "Fly" by Blind Guardian is about Peter Pan
- In the seventh episode on season 10 of Grey's Anatomy, Jo Wilson (Camilla Luddington) dresses as Tinker Bell for Halloween and shows up at her boyfriend Alex Karev's (Justin Chambers) house, after a fight they had resulting from his estranged father's appearance, showing her loyalty to the boy who didn't grow up
- The song "Lost Boy" by Ruth B refers to an orphan being taken to Neverland by Peter Pan to join the Lost Boys, who spend some of their time running away from Captain Hook.
- The cartoon series World of Winx features Peter Pan and Neverland characters Smee, Jim (Captain Hook), Crocodile Man (Crocodile), Queen (Tinker Bell), Wendy Darling. Peter Pan has a son named Matt Barrie
- The film Viy 2: Journey to China features a character named James Hook (played by Arnold Schwarzenegger) whose outfit and personality appear to be inspired by Hook
- In the film Chip 'n Dale: Rescue Rangers (2022), Will Arnett plays Sweet Pete, a middle-aged version of Peter Pan who became a crime boss
- The song "Cardigan" by Taylor Swift references Peter Pan and Wendy Darling during its final chorus. Swift again references Peter Pan in "Peter", comparing the titular character in her song to Pan himself as both never grow up, and also refers to her Peter in the second person as being "lost to the 'Lost Boys' chapter of your life".
