= Never Land Books =

Chapter book series

The Never Land Books or Never Land Adventures are a series of short chapter books set in Never Land, the home of Peter Pan. They are based on the situations and characters established in the novel Peter and the Starcatchers and its sequels. Like the novels, the books are written by American authors Dave Barry and Ridley Pearson and illustrated by Greg Call. Although five Never Land books were planned, only three were published: Escape from the Carnivale (2006), Cave of the Dark Wind (2007), and Blood Tide (2008). The stories focus on supporting characters from the novels, such as the Mollusk Island Natives, mermaids, pirates, and Lost Boys.

The books are published by Hyperion Books (a subsidiary of The Walt Disney Company) in defiance of a copyright claim of Great Ormond Street Hospital (GOSH) of London, to which writer J. M. Barrie gave the Peter Pan works in 1929, as confirmed in his will. GOSH has argued that United States copyright law gives them exclusive rights to the characters and setting until 2023. Disney argues that the copyright had already expired in the U.S. when Congress extended the term to the length claimed by GOSH.

== See also ==
- Peter and Wendy
- Peter and the Starcatchers
- Peter and the Shadow Thieves
- Peter and the Secret of Rundoon
- Peter and the Sword of Mercy
- The Bridge to Never Land
