= Kingdom Keepers =

Children's novels by Ridley Pearson 2005–2013

Kingdom Keepers series
- The cover of Kingdom Keepers VII: The Insider, featuring the Evil Queen from Snow White watching over as Disneyland's Sleeping Beauty Castle burns.
- Kingdom Keepers: Disney After Dark (2005); Disney at Dawn (2008); Disney in Shadow (2010); Power Play (2011); Shell Game (2012); Dark Passage (2013); The Insider (2014); Kingdom Keepers: The Return: Disney Lands (2015); Legacy of Secrets (2016); Disney at Last! (2017); Kingdom Keepers: Inheritance: The Shimmer (2023); Villains’ Realm (2024); The Final Draw (2025); Novellas: Unforeseen - A Kingdom Keepers Novella (2014); The Syndrome - A Kingdom Keepers Adventure (2015)
- Author: Ridley Pearson
- Country: United States
- Language: English
- Genre: Fantasy; young adult fiction; mystery; thriller
- Publisher: Disney Publishing Worldwide: Disney Editions; Disney • Hyperion
- Published: 2005–2014; Return: 2015–2017; Inheritance: 2023–present
- Media type: Print (hardcover and paperback), audiobook, ebook

Kingdom Keepers is a series of children's novels written by American author Ridley Pearson. The New York Times Bestselling series is published through Disney Editions and Disney Hyperion, and the first book was released on August 29, 2005. Its plot follows the adventures of five teens who, by day, are holographic hosts in the Disney Theme Parks. By night, they battle Disney villains to keep them from taking control of the parks, the Disney entertainment empire, and the world. The series' franchise also includes several other elements such as an online game and an interactive educational tour provided for school groups through Disney's Youth Education Series.

== Synopsis ==
=== Disney After Dark (2005) ===
Five young teens, Finn, Willa, Charlene, Maybeck, and Philby, have been selected to serve as holographic theme park guides, Disney Hosts Interactives (DHI), in Walt Disney World. Thanks to an ability programmed in their virtual avatars by the Imagineers of Disney in the DHI technology the five teens are transported every night into the park as holograms while they sleep. They find themselves in the middle of a war against various Disney villains called the Overtakers, led by Maleficent from Sleeping Beauty, and they must stop them from taking over the park and then the world.

=== Disney at Dawn (2008) ===
Things have been relatively quiet for the past few months, until things go wrong at DHI day at Magic Kingdom. The Overtakers are back, and this time the stakes are even higher. This book introduces the Fairlies, or Fairly Humans, a group of people with special powers; a Fairlie named Jez has gone missing, and her sister, Amanda recruits the help of the Keepers to help her find Jez. The group searches for clues to her disappearance while also trying to keep the Overtakers at bay in Disney's Animal Kingdom, where the Overtakers have gained control of the computer servers with the intent to wreak havoc. The Keepers must find Jez and destroy the Overtakers' servers.

=== Disney in Shadow (2010) ===
After Wayne, their friend, mentor, and head Imagineer, disappeared during the events at Animal Kingdom, Finn, Philby, Willa, Charlene, and Maybeck suspect the worst. The Overtakers would like nothing more than to eliminate Wayne, or worse, to use his power to their own ends. Their search takes the Keepers, plus Amanda and Jez, into Hollywood Studios and Epcot, where they must fight through puzzles, giant snakes, and deal with Maleficent and her friends while discovering new truths about themselves.

=== Power Play (2011) ===
For the five teens who modeled as Disney Hologram Imaging hosts, life is beginning to settle down when an intriguing video arrives to Philby's computer at school. It's a call for action: the Overtakers seem to be plotting to attempt a rescue, led by the Evil Queen and Cruella De Vil, of two of their leaders, both of whom the Disney Imagineers locked away following a violent encounter in Epcot.

=== Shell Game (2012) ===
Spring break for the Keepers means a DHI cruise from Florida through the Panama canal to Los Angeles, with stops in exotic locations—including Castaway Cay, Disney's private island. However, for the Keepers the vacation may not be as much of a break as they'd hoped. With an ongoing battle for Walt Disney World's engineering base back home, and Overtakers aboard the ship plotting something catastrophic, the Keepers are in a battle for their lives and the lives of the guests aboard the ship.

=== Dark Passage (2013) ===
The five Kingdom Keepers and their core friends have uncovered a startling truth: Maleficent and the Overtakers are plotting a catastrophic event that could have repercussions far beyond the world of Disney.

=== The Insider (2014) ===
The Keepers have enjoyed three years of relative quiet, but as they prepare to graduate high school, the Overtakers, and a nightmare they left buried in an ancient temple in Mexico, are rising again. This time, they are headed to Disneyland. The Overtakers are done playing games, and the Keepers are in more danger than ever. The only one who may be able to save the kingdom is none other than Disney's most beloved icon, but he has been missing for years and time is running out.

=== Novellas ===
==== Unforeseen (2014) ====
This is an ebook novella focusing on the Fairlie sisters. It picks up after Kingdom Keepers VI: Dark Passage and leads up to Book VII: The Insider. Unforeseen opens with Jess dreaming of "cracks" in Disneyland. As Jess and Amanda set out to find answers, she encounters an old man with secrets, a young Imagineer-in-training whose future Jess wants to see, and a treasured wonderland about to shatter.

==== The Syndrome: A Kingdom Keepers Adventure (2015) ====
Written with Brooke Muschott (as Jess) and Elizabeth Hagenlocher (as Mattie), this adventure focuses on Amanda, who is searching for the missing Kingdom Keeper Finn Whitman. Calling on her own gift (telekinesis), her sister Jez' ability to dream the future, and their fellow Fairlie Mattie Weaver's unexplained ability to read minds through physical contact, the three gifted girls must navigate treachery, deception, and the stubborn, unwilling parents of the missing Keepers if they plan to save their friends.

=== The Return ===
The Kingdom Keepers series was followed by its sequel series, The Return. The theme that Pearson had wanted to explore was a fictional Imagineering school and the origins of the Overtakers, the books' villains. A father and son, who were fans of the books, initially suggested the concept of King Arthur Carrousel being a means of time travel, and the protagonist using it to go back to Disneyland opening day. Pearson was granted access to the Disney Archives to research Disneyland's opening day.

==== Disney Lands (2015) ====
In the first book, the Keepers are about to go off to college, while the Fairlie sisters are attending the Disney School of Imagineering. Finn is the only one who believes there is something else left to do—namely, that Walt's pen is not where it needs to be in the past—and attempts to follow Wayne's final clues.

The Keepers eventually discover that the music box in Walt's apartment opens an anomaly on a horse on King Arthur Carousel, allowing its rider to travel through time. It is up to the Kingdom Keepers to return to the place, and time, they are most needed—Disneyland's opening day.

==== Legacy of Secrets (2016) ====
In the second book, the Keepers have successfully arrived at Disneyland's Opening Day in 1955, there to track down Walt's pen and ensure that it is in the right place in the future. Compared to earlier missions, this seems a simple task, especially with the help of their old mentor Wayne, a teen worker at the park in 1955. But they face problems: although the Overtakers do not yet exist, there is a group of regular people who want to stop them and use Walt's magic against him. To make matters worse, Tia Dalma, in the present, has secretly reformed the Overtakers and plans to wreak havoc on the Keepers' plans.

==== Disney at Last! (2017) ====
In the third book, Finn and the other Keepers, now joined in the past by Amanda and Jess, have decided to make use of the fact that they cannot yet return home and stop Hollingsworth from creating the Overtakers. Marking the end of the sequel series, the book ends with the Keepers tearfully saying goodbye to this tumultuous era of their life.

== Characters ==
- Finn Whitman – he is the only one that can be 100% hologram until DHI 2.0. Finn is the main character in the story, and the natural leader of the group.
- Dell Philby – a computer geek, his intelligence is the greatest among the crew.
- Charlene Turner – a star gymnast and athlete with a cheerleader body, Charlene's got both the beauty and the brawn.
- Terry Maybeck – the artistic member of the DHIs, Maybeck can be hot-tempered and impulsive.
- Willa Angelo – Willa is very good with a bow and arrow.
- Dillard Cole - Finn's best friend, who "thinks of girls as a separate species".
- Amanda Lockhart - Finn's girlfriend and a Fairlie with an ability to move things with her mind. She later gets turned into a DHI.
- Jessica Lockhart - Amanda's sister and a Fairlie with an ability to dream the future. She later gets turned into a DHI.
- Wayne Kresky - an elder Disney Imagineer hired by Walt Disney himself. He came up with the idea to make the DHIs save the parks from the Overtakers, using the idea of them becoming hologram guides as an excuse. He lives above the fire station on Main Street.
- Maleficent - the first Overtaker encountered by the keepers, and one of the strongest ones, although she is not their leader. She causes a lot of trouble early on.

== Background ==
About 2002, Ridley Pearson and his family went to Disney World for the first time with humorist Dave Barry. Pearson indicated to Wendy Lefkon, Disney Publishing Worldwide editorial director, that he found that each attraction and ride "tells a story, with a beginning, a middle, and the end". Lefkon responded with an offer to write a teen thriller novel in a Disney park setting. Pearson then requested full access in off-hours, which Disney would not grant. Based on his writing process of hands-on and site research, Pearson turned down the offer. A month later, he was granted full access during off-hours. Pearson had finished the first of the series' novel in 2004 before the publication of his co-written book, Peter and the Starcatchers, with Barry. A five-book series was outlined by Pearson. The first book in the series, Disney After Dark, was released on August 29, 2005. With Disney After Dark selling well, Hyperion wanted to expand the series to 10 novels, but Pearson felt he could only stretch out the series to 7 books. With needing to move the story to Disneyland, the story in book 5 jumps to Disney Magic cruise ship which was being repositioned to California.

The fourth book in the series, Power Play, came out in April 2011 and made the New York Times Bestseller Children's Series the week of April 24. With the last book, Kingdom Keepers VII: The Insider, Pearson crowdsourced some 200 out of 600 pages, with fans voting online for which direction the book would take.

During the tour for the final book in the series, Pearson announced a new sequel trilogy for this fictional world, called The Return. The first book in the trilogy follow-up series was released on March 31, 2015. Pearson was thinking of a series called Kingdom Keepers International, taking the main characters away from the parks and going international.

The first three books were rewritten in 2020 to reflect the updated and more modern aspects of the park. The remaining four updated books were expected to be published in 2021. Included with the updated version was a preview of the upcoming Kingdom Keepers book, "First Light". It was slated to be released in March 2021, but due to the coronavirus pandemic, it was pushed to a later date. A new book in the series, Kingdom Keepers Inheritance: The Shimmer, was released on February 21, 2023. This series is set in the future and focuses on the children of the original Kingdom Keepers, based on the preview given in the updated books.

== Publishing ==
Original series:

1. Disney After Dark (August 29, 2005) Disney Editions audiobook (August 1, 2005) Brilliance Audio, read by Gary Littman
2. Disney at Dawn (August 26, 2008)
3. Disney in Shadow (April 6, 2010)
4. Power Play (April 5, 2011) Disney • Hyperion, on the New York Times Bestseller Children's Series the week of April 24, 2011
5. Shell Game (April 3, 2012)
6. Dark Passage (April 2, 2013)
7. The Insider (April 1, 2014)

The Return:

1. Disney Lands (March 31, 2015)
2. Legacy of Secrets
3. Disney At Last

The Inheritance:

1. The Shimmer (February 21, 2023)
2. Villains Realm (February 27, 2024)
3. The Final Draw (February 25, 2025)

Novellas:

- Unforeseen - a Kingdom Keepers Novella (2014)
- The Syndrome - a Kingdom Keepers Adventure (March 3, 2015)

== Media ==
=== Kingdom Keepers Online ===
Disney released an online game entitled Kingdom Keepers Online in April 2010. The game is collaborative, as all players control one of five selectable characters through 2,500 levels. Each level is procedurally generated and gameplay is action based.

=== Kingdom Keepers Insider ===
In March 2013, Disney and interactive tech company Coliloquy launched Kingdom Keepers Insider, a website and mobile app that enables readers to interact with Pearson and impact how the final book in the series will be written. Users can vote on elements such as potential plot points and may also submit ideas for character dialogue. The site features other elements such as chapter outlines posted by Pearson.

=== Aborted television series ===
Kevin Smith revealed on Fatman Beyond that he was brought in by Disney to help develop a potential television series, based on the Kingdom Keepers book series, for Disney+. He added that it would have utilized the same technology used for The Mandalorian to create virtual backgrounds. He later confirmed that it was cancelled because it would have used too many IPs.
