= Peter and the Shadow Thieves =

2006 children's book by Dave Barry and Ridley Pearson

- First edition
- Author: Dave Barry; Ridley Pearson
- Illustrator: Greg Call
- Language: English
- Publisher: Hyperion Books for Children
- Publication date: July 2006
- Pages: 592
- ISBN: 0-7868-3787-X
- OCLC: 62895834
- LC Class: PZ7.B278 Pdh 2006
- Preceded by: Peter and the Starcatchers
- Followed by: Peter and the Secret of Rundoon

Peter and the Shadow Thieves is a children's novel that was published by Hyperion Books, a subsidiary of The Walt Disney Company, in 2006. Written by humorist Dave Barry and novelist Ridley Pearson, the book is a sequel to their book Peter and the Starcatchers, continuing the story of the orphan Peter and his latest adventures with the Starcatchers. The "Starcatchers" series is an epic story of a battle between good and evil, incorporating a reimagined version of characters and situations from J. M. Barrie's classic novel Peter and Wendy. It was illustrated by artist Greg Call.

The series continues in Peter and the Secret of Rundoon, Peter and the Sword of Mercy, and The Bridge to Never Land. Hyperion also released a series of short short chapter books by the same authors, detailing daily misadventures of the Lost Boys.

== Plot summary ==
The book starts three months after the end of Peter and the Starcatchers. Peter, James, Thomas, Prentiss, and Tubby Ted have settled on the island, with Tinker Bell keeping a watchful eye on Peter and the pirates, led by Black Stache (who now goes by the alias "Captain Hook" since his initial fight with Peter), have erected and settled into a fort. Around this time, Le Fantome, under scarred Captain Nerezza, finds Mollusk Island after weeks of searching, accompanied by the vengeful Slank and the dark, menacing, mysterious entity known as Lord Ombra. During a confrontation with Hook as Peter and the mermaids rescue a captured James, a posse from Le Fantome hold a nighttime standoff with the Mollusk tribe over the location of the large quantity of Starstuff that had briefly been on the island. After Ombra deduces that the Starstuff was taken by Lord Aster and the Starcatchers, the group leaves the island and immediately set sail for England. Peter, having witnessed the confrontation, decides that he must warn Molly of the approaching danger and stows away on the ship with Tinker Bell.

The Asters receive a tip from the dolphins warning them of the landing party on Mollusk Island and the presence of the inhuman Ombra, prompting Leonard Aster to leave London with the Starstuff and guard it in a hidden location until the Return (the starstuff would be sent back into the heavens), leaving new nightmen to guard Molly and her mother, Louise. Meanwhile, Peter's presence on the ship is detected by Lord Ombra, forcing Peter to fake his death by temporarily jumping ship before flying back on board. When they arrive in London, Peter and Tinker Bell take off to find the Aster mansion but quickly become lost in the city. Peter and Tink are later captured and separated by a constable and a bird seller, respectively, but Tink is able to escape and save Peter from a court hearing. They continue to search for the Aster mansion in upper-class parts of London.

Meanwhile, Slank, Nerezza, and Ombra plan with various agents of the Others on how to safely invade the Aster household, whereas Ombra possesses the new nightmen so that they would not be a problem. After finding gnawed food remnants on the ship and after hearing of Peter's escape from the court by flying, Slank deduces that Peter is in London and believes that he will interfere with their plans. Later, the men break into the household to capture Molly and Louise. Jenna, a housemaid who is in cahoot with the group, puts the household staff to sleep and threatens Molly in her room with a knife while Slank and various others kidnap Louise and Ombra makes his way to Molly's room. With directions from J. M. Barrie, Peter arrives and locates Molly, who realizes that Ombra possesses his victims by touching their shadows and blows out the candles. They barely escape from Ombra and take shelter in the room of Molly's friend George Darling, and decide to locate Leonard Aster.

Peter and Molly later make a nighttime visit to the Tower of London, where the Keep, a secret compound of the Starcatchers, is located. After conferring with Starcatcher Mr. McGuinn about the situation, Ombra, Slank, and various others break in, killing McGuinn, but Molly and Peter manage to escape. With help from George, they deduce that Aster went to Salisbury and the three take a train in and eventually locate him there. Aster expresses his disdain at their arrival but learns of the situation and an apparent ransom for Louise from Molly, but confines them to the house after revealing that the Return was to happen that night. Molly later recalls that Ombra touched McGuinn's shadow before he died, thus realizing that Ombra may have seized knowledge of the Return and that it is in danger. After letting George in on the business of the Starcatchers, George recalls that a lunar eclipse was happening that night, and that the site of the Return was Stonehenge. The three escape from the house and fly to Stonehenge.

Meanwhile, Aster and fellow Starcatchers Magill are ambushed midway through the return by Ombra, Slank, Nerezza, and various agents of the Others. Aster is shot after closing the box of Starstuff to protect a possessed Louise, and Slank nearly kills Peter. Molly and George haul out the Asters, while Tink, Magill, and Magill's bear Karl drive off the men. Peter stays behind to reopen the closed box before the timeframe for the Return finishes, but Ombra makes contact with Peter's shadow and they both engage in a brief but intense mental battle before Peter manages to open the box, thus completing the Return of the Starstuff to the Heavens, with the resulting flashes of light seemingly disintegrating Ombra and releasing Louise and various others from his control. Slank and the Others are forced to flee. A couple days later, Peter bids his goodbyes to the Asters and George before flying back to Mollusk Island.

During the plot in London, Captain Hook and the pirates manage to locate and capture James, Thomas, Prentiss, and Tubby Ted in order to lure Peter back and get his revenge. After some time, with the unknowing help of first mate Smee and various island monkeys, the boys manage to escape the cage that they were located in just as Peter arrives and opens the gates of the fort for them to get out, and afterwards promptly hits Hook in the face with a mango, ending the book.

== Characters ==
Many of the characters from Peter and the Starcatchers are back for this sequel. However, a few characters are also mentioned in Peter Pan and Wendy, and some were created exclusively for Peter and the Shadow Thieves.

- Peter has gained the permanent ability to fly and to never physically grow older because of his exposure to starstuff. Peter has red hair. Growing cocky from his new abilities, he torments Captain Hook. When Hook captures one of Peter's friends, James, Peter vows to become more mature. So, when he learns his friend Molly will be in danger, because Lord Ombra will use her to exchange the starstuff, stating that fathers have soft spots for their daughters, he immediately sets out to save her. He is more than a little disturbed that she has a male friend named George Darling. Peter is accompanied in his adventures by his guardian Tinker Bell, a small fairy or "birdwoman", who is very protective of Peter.
- Tinker Bell was originally a green-and-yellow-coloured bird put in a bag of starstuff and was made into the guardian of Peter by Molly's father, the famous starcatcher, Lord Leonard Aster. She hates when she is called a fairy, because she would much rather be called "birdwoman" because it supports her heritage. She is very protective of Peter, she supremely dislikes when Peter pays attention to any other female, she calls the mermaid, Teacher, "a big fat grouper", tends to hope she gets eaten by an octopus, and calls Molly Aster "a stupid fat cow". She is able to emit a very bright light. This helps Peter many times against Lord Ombra, though this technique often ends in her exhaustion and sometimes fainting.
- Molly Aster, daughter to the great Starcatcher Leonard Aster, looks a lot like her mother, with long brown hair, but inherited her father's startling green eyes. London society views her as a beautiful child, but also unusual, seeing as she is not interested in the things girls her class are into, and appears have her mind is always thinking of something else. When her father leaves to move a great amount of starstuff to a safe location, she is left behind as company for her mother. Soon, Molly learns that her house has been invaded by spies, and that the creature Lord Ombra wants to steal her family's shadows. Molly sets off with Peter to continue protecting the starstuff, even at the cost of her mother's life. Molly lives in a mansion near Kensington Gardens, and she is a childhood friend of George Darling. They both have feelings for each other, as hinted in this book, and do not know how or whether to express them. It is hinted she also has feelings for Peter.
- The Lost Boys were originally orphans from St. Norbert's Home for Wayward Boys. James is leader to Thomas, Prentiss, and Tubby Ted when Peter is not around. The Lost Boys discover their underground home in this book — they are also captured and nearly killed by Captain Hook, but manage to escape.
- Captain Hook, formerly Black Stache, is a disgusting, filthy pirate, captain of the ship, the Jolly Roger. As his left hand was cut off by Peter, he replaced it with a hook-shaped dagger, earning his nickname from Peter. Annoyed by Peter's constant teasing, Hook tries unsuccessfully to use the Lost Boys as a ransom. He can not bear to leave his newly built fortress, for fear of being eaten by the huge crocodile, Mr. Grin.
- Mr. Slank is the evil sailor from the Never Land, returning from the first book. Slank is one of the "Others" who use starstuff corruptly, and he has joined forces with the creature Lord Ombra to avenge his humiliation by Peter. In Starcatchers, Slank had a sidekick named Little Richard. Slank had to kill Richard and eat him in order to survive for months in an adrift rowboat. His fate is unknown after the encounter with Starcatchers.
- Lord Ombra is the new villain in this novel, and Peter's arch-nemesis. He is part man, part shadow, and he moves like liquid. He causes a chill to come over anyone he nears, because he is able to steal their shadow or possess them to read their thoughts and enslave them. Ombra is afraid of the light, but it aids him in capturing shadows. He is one of the greater "Others". Lord Ombra is destroyed by a brilliant flash of light that breaks him into millions of tiny shadows. The name Ombra is derived from the Italian word for "shadow".
- Captain Nerezza is captain of the ship Le Fantome, and he is one of the "Others" who uses starstuff for evil. Nerezza takes Lord Ombra and Slank from England and back again in search of starstuff. One important feature of Nerezza is he has no nose — it was cut off in Africa, but replaced by a wooden nose carved from blackwood and held on with a leather strap. Nerezza is able to smell by lifting the false nose and breathing through a hole in his face. The name Nerezza is derived from the Italian word for "blackness".
- George Darling is Molly Aster's London friend, and he grows up to become the father of Wendy, John, and Michael. George apparently has feelings for Molly, but he finds her changed since she returned from her voyage at sea. He is very loyal, and allows even Peter to stay in his room without his parents' knowledge. George is most likely featured in this novel because at the end of Disney's 1953 film, Mr. Darling implies that he has met Peter Pan "a long time ago, when I was very young".
- Lord Leonard Aster and Lady Louise Aster, Molly's parents, live in a mansion near Kensington Gardens. Molly's father is an ambassador to King Zarboff III of Rundoon, but he is secretly one of the greatest Starcatchers. Leonard jeopardizes the mission of returning the starstuff at Stonehenge, because his wife and daughter are about to be killed. Leonard himself is shot in Shadow Thieves, but Peter heals him with a bit of starstuff. Louise Aster is Molly's mother, who is left behind with her daughter when her husband leaves to look after the starstuff. Lady Aster's shadow is stolen by Lord Ombra, and her corpse-like body is used to lure Molly out of hiding. Louise Aster's shadow is returned by the end of the novel.
- Mr Magill is a Starcatcher who own tame wolves and a tame bear. He can communicate with them and uses them to protect a home that the Starcatcher own. He also helps keep the Others away while Peter completes the Return. He also returns in Sword of Mercy and is mentioned in Bridge to Never Land.
- J. M. Barrie - a nice young man who rescues Peter from being beaten by a gang of hooligans in London. In Bridge to Never Land, it is revealed that Barrie wrote his Peter Pan stories within the series universe, suggesting he somehow had contact with Starcatchers and learned a semi-accurate version of the truth, but the details of how this happened are not addressed.
- Mr. McGuinn is an older Starcatcher and friend and mentor of Leonard.

There is one point in the book where the authors introduce J.M. Barrie. He gives Peter directions to Molly's house by saying “You want the second path to the right, then straight on ‘till you see a row of fine mansions." It plays on the directions to Neverland in Peter and Wendy, "Second to the right and straight on till morning."
