= Lost Boy (Henry novel) =

Dark fantasy novel

First edition (publ. Berkley Books)

Lost Boy: The True Story of Captain Hook is a 2017 dark fantasy parallel novel by Christina Henry inspired by the work of J.M. Barrie.

Set in the world of Neverland, Lost Boy is about Jamie, one of Peter Pan's Lost Boys, who begins to grow increasingly disenchanted with Peter as he slowly grows up.

== Summary ==
Jamie is a young boy who lives on the magical fantasy island of Neverland brought to the island by Peter Pan to be one of his playmates. Jamie is Peter's longest serving companion and feels they have a special bond.

Jamie acts as a surrogate parent to the boys and is especially protective of newcomer Charlie as he is much younger than the others. Peter grows jealous of Charlie and Jamie begins to suspect that Peter might indirectly allow Charlie to die through neglect.

While planning a trip to battle pirates, the boys are attacked by a Many-Eyed, one of the giant poisonous spiders on the island. Jamie manages to kill the spider much to Peter's displeasure, who accidentally reveals that he has a treaty with the beasts allowing them to kill whichever boys they want while leaving Peter alone.

Jamie later discovers that Nip, one of the older boys, has tried to kill Charlie on Peter's instructions though Peter has plausible deniability as his instructions were ambiguous. Though Charlie survives the attack Peter suggests that Nip and Jamie participate in Battle, a gladiator hand-to-hand combat where the boys try to kill each other with only one boy surviving.

During Battle Jamie realizes that Nip disclosed their location to pirates. He manages to murder Nip but the pirates attack, killing and wounding several of the other boys. One of the boys, Sal, is stabbed. When Jamie tends to his wounds he realizes Sal is actually a girl called Sally. The news infuriates Peter, who throws a tantrum and disappears.

Jamie helps Sally recover and the two begin to have romantic feelings for one another. The group become disenchanted with Peter and Jamie, along with Sal, plot to go back to the other world, where they originally came from. Before they can leave Jamie goes to visit the tree that acts as a portal between worlds and discovers it has been hacked down. He additionally finds Charlie and Peter gone and realizes Peter intends to kill Charlie by leaving him among the Many-Eyed.

Jamie goes to the field where the Many-Eyed live and burns them out. He and Sal manage to save Charlie who reveals to them that Peter is now able to fly thanks to a tamed fairy he calls Tink.

Returning to their home to find the rest of the boys Jamie discovers one of them murdered by Peter while the other, Nod, survives an attack. Nod and Jamie go to reunite with Sal and Charlie on the beach where they plan to escape by boat and arrive in time to save Charlie from Peter. Sal however is dead from a crocodile attack orchestrated by Peter.

Discovering that the boat they were planning to use has been destroyed by Peter, Jamie accepts Peter's offer to perform one last Battle against him. Jamie overpowers Peter but does not succeed in killing him as Peter reveals that the island keeps him immortal. He curses Jamie to live on the island as an adult before cutting off his hand.

Jamie, Nod and Charlie go to live with the pirates where Jamie replaces his hand with a hook and becomes their captain. The pirates are befuddled they can never leave the island though they do not realize it is thanks to Jamie and his curse. Watching Peter take boys back and forth over the years Jamie continues to nourish his hatred of Peter.

== Reception ==
Lost Boy received positive reviews with Tom Shippey of The Wall Street Journal calling it a "riveting story".
