= Steel Trapp: The Challenge =

2008 young adult thriller novel by Ridley Pearson

- First edition cover
- Author: Ridley Pearson
- Audio read by: William Dufris
- Publisher: Disney
- Publication date: March 2008
- ISBN: 1-4231-0640-7
- Followed by: Steel Trapp: The Academy (2010)

Steel Trapp: The Challenge is a 2008 young adult thriller novel by American author Ridley Pearson, published by Disney Editions in the United States and distributed to Canada. It is also published in the United Kingdom by Quercus under the shortened title Steel Trapp. The audiobook rendition was narrated by William Dufris.

The next book in the series is Steel Trapp: The Academy (2010).

== Plot summary ==
Steven "Steel" Trapp is travelling across the country to compete in a science challenge in Washington D.C., but when a mysterious woman gets off the train and leaves her suitcase, the adventure begins. Chasing the woman and piecing together the mystery in the suitcase, Steel discovers the unimaginable.

With the FBI and international terrorist in pursuit, Steel teams up with his buddy Kaileigh to thwart a conspiracy aimed at the national lottery and prove himself innocent.
