= Science Fair (novel) =

2008 novel by Dave Barry and Ridley Pearson

- First edition
- Author: Dave Barry, Ridley Pearson
- Cover artist: Garth Williams
- Language: English
- Genre: Children's
- Publication date: October 14, 2008
- Publication place: United States
- Pages: 400
- ISBN: 1423113241

Science Fair (2008) is a novel by Dave Barry and Ridley Pearson.

== Plot summary ==
5 years or so before the book's main plot, a Krpshtskani singer named Gmygmy is disgraced by the American public because his vocals sound like a dying horse. This enrages the Krpshtskanis, who live in a fictional impoverished country about the size of Luxembourg. Grdankl the Strong, president of Krpshtskan and Gmygmy's father, decides to exact revenge by sending his other son, Prmkt, to the US to disrupt their electrical grid.

Prmkt applies for a job as a janitor at Hubble Middle School, a prestigious public school in southern Maryland that hosts an annual science fair with a cash prize for the winner. Prmkt secretly sends notes to the Manor Estates (ME) kids, children of rich government officials who win the science fair every year by going to a store in the local mall called the Science Nook, where the owner, Neil Sternabite, secretly builds their projects for a fee. Prmkt's note says that for a fee, he will give the ME kids blueprints to build technical items for the science fair.

Meanwhile, Toby Harbinger, a kid attending Hubble Middle School, decides to investigate the cheating at his school to catch the ME kids, who routinely bully him. He learns about their yearly scheme and confronts the principal of his school (nicknamed the Hornet because the students find her scary). However, he is unable to prove anything, and is suspended because Prmkt frames him for cheating to get him out of the way. Sternabite reveals to Toby that he is having second thoughts about this year's projects for the ME kids because of a suspicion he has about the combination of the projects. Toby and his two friends Micah and Tamara get sent to jail after Prmkt blackmails them, as well as two men Grdankl the Strong sent to "help", Drmtsi and Vrsk. Toby and his friends escape in a Weinermobile to Hubble where they arrive just in time stop Prmkt's plan. Fester the frog plays a key role in taking down Prmkt. Prmkt later is forced to work for the FBI.
