= Coliloquy =

American digital publishing house

- Founded: January 2012
- Founder: Lisa Rutherford and Waynn Lue
- Country of origin: USA
- Headquarters location: San Francisco
- Publication types: Entwined, Fluid, Georgetown Academy
- Fiction genres: Young Adult, Young Adult Romance, Romance, Erotica
- Official website: http://www.coliloquy.com/

Coliloquy is a digital publishing house based in San Francisco, which specializes in interactive fiction. It was co-founded by Lisa Rutherford and Waynn Lue in January 2012. Coliloquy has published books from over 40 authors, among them Stephen King, Amy Tan, and Matt Groening.

In 2014, Coliloquy was acquired by Vook, a multimedia book publisher. Vook subsequently altered its business strategy in 2015 and rebranded as Pronoun.

== Notable Features ==
Coliloquy was the second ebook publisher to develop Active Content for the Amazon Kindle. By engaging with specific features of book applications, readers can control the outcome of the narrative. Some titles provide the reader with choice points within the story, allowing the reader to pick path A or B. Other books allow for readers to participate in the writing of a book.

== Titles ==
Most Coliloquy titles are classified as Young Adult, Young Adult Romance, Romance, or Erotica

- Entwined by Joy Daniels, Debra Hyde, A.Devlin, Lissa Trevor
- Fluid by Travis Sentell
- Georgetown Academy by Alyssa Embree Schwartz & Jessica Koosed Etting
- Great Escapes by Lynda Scott & Linda Wisdom
- Hard Listening by Stephen King, Scott Turow, Amy Tan, Dave Barry, Roy Blount, Jr., Mitch Albom, James McBride, Ridley Pearson, Matt Groening, Greg Iles, Sam Barry, Roger McGuinn
- Kingdom Keepers Insider by Ridley Pearson
- King Solomon's Wives series by Holly McDowell
- Outer Banks Tennis Academy by Jennifer Iacopelli
- Spellspinners of Melas County by Heidi R. Kling
- Shultz Sisters Mysteries by Tawna Fenske
- The Parish Mail Series by Kira Snyder
- Totlandia by Josie Brown

Children's Books

- A Dark & Dismal Flower by J.C. Herz and Eve Scott. Illustrations by Shamona Stokes and animation by Alex Scott
