= Christina Henry =

American author (born 1974)

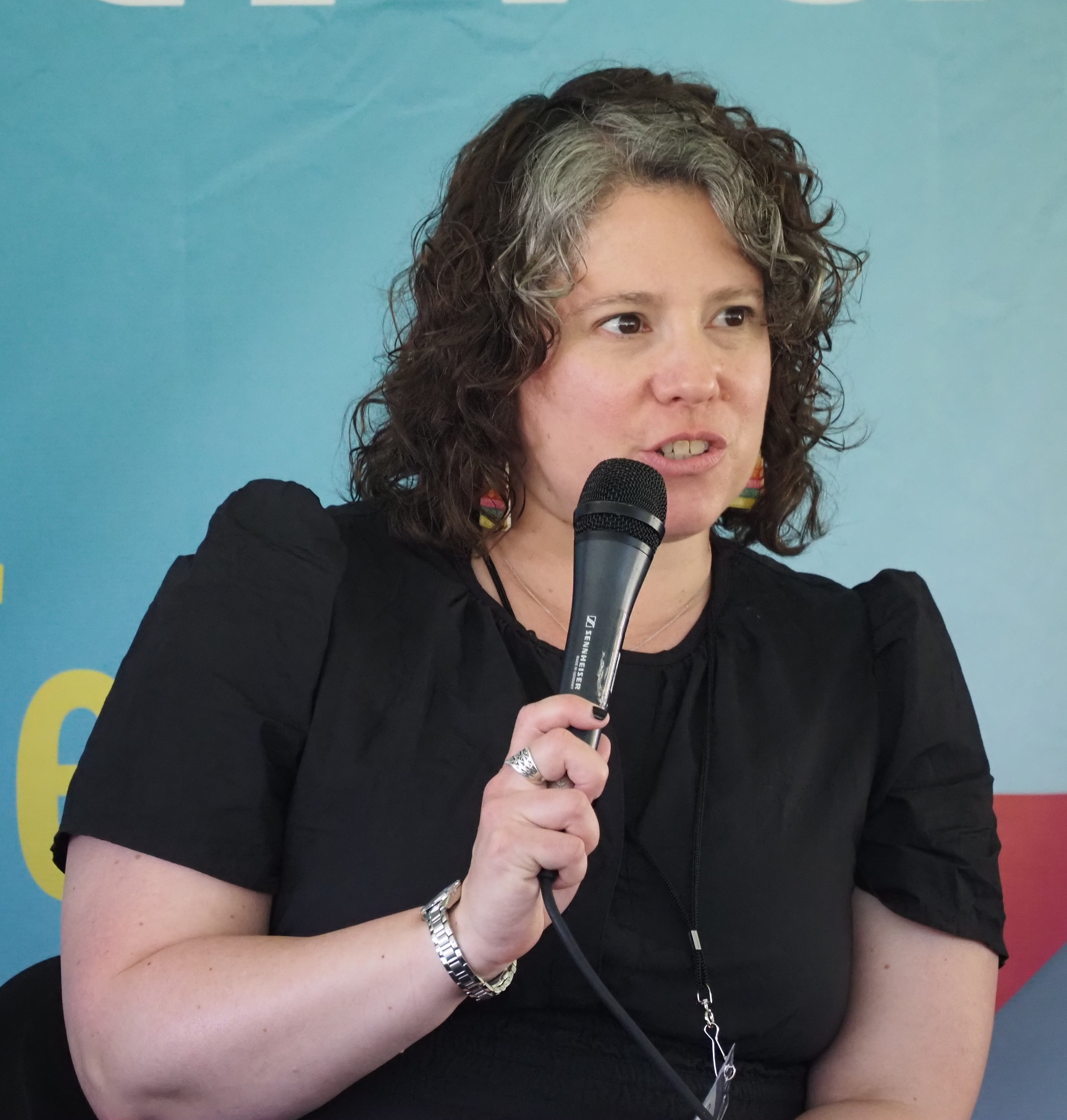
- Henry in 2026
- Born: 1974 (age 51–52) New York City, U.S.
- Occupation: Writer
- Genre: Horror, dark fantasy
- Notable works: Lost Boy (2017)

Website
- www.christinahenry.net

Christina Henry (born 1974, in New York, USA) is an American novelist working in the horror and dark fantasy genre. Her Black Wings series, is a national bestseller. She has also produced her own retellings of classic children's tales, such as the three works in The Chronicles of Alice series (based on the Alice books of Lewis Carroll), Lost Boy (2017) from J.M. Barrie's Peter Pan, and The Girl in Red (2019) based on Little Red Riding Hood.

== Works ==
=== The Black Wings Books ===
- Black Wings (2010). Penguin US, ISBN 978-0-441-01963-2
- Black Night (2011). ACE, ISBN 978-1-937007-06-5
- Black Howl (2012). ACE, ISBN 978-1-937007-33-1
- Black Lament (2012). ACE, ISBN 978-0-425-25657-2
- Black City (2013). ACE, ISBN 978-0-425-25658-9
- Black Heart (2013). Ace Books, ISBN 978-0-425-25659-6
- Black Spring (2014). ACE, ISBN 978-0-425-26678-6

=== The Chronicles of Alice Books ===
- Alice (2015). Ace, ISBN 978-0-425-26679-3
- Red Queen (2016). Ace, ISBN 978-0-425-26680-9
- Looking Glass (2020). Ace, ISBN 978-1-9848-0563-8

The Dark Chronicles

- Lost Boy: The True Story of Captain Hook (2017). Berkley Publishing Group, ISBN 978-0-399-58402-2
- The Mermaid (2018). Berkley Publishing Group, ISBN 978-0-399-58404-6
- The Girl in Red (2019). Berkley Publishing Group, ISBN 978-0-451-49228-9

=== Standalone Novels ===
- The Ghost Tree (2020). Berkley Books, ISBN 978-0-451-49230-2
- Near the Bone (2021). Titan Books Ltd, ISBN 978-0-593-19976-3
- Horseman (2021). Titan Publ. Group Ltd., ISBN 978-0-593-19978-7
- Into the Forest: Tales of the Baba Yaga (2022). Black Spot Books, ISBN 978-1-64548-123-2
- Good Girls Don't Die (2023). Random House N.Y., ISBN 978-0-593-63819-4
- The House That Horror Built (2024). Random House N.Y., ISBN 978-0-593-63821-7
- "The Place Where They Buried Your Heart" First Edition November 2025

Short Stories

- in Kicking It (2013) by Rachel Caine, Chloe Neil, Rob Thurman, Christina Henry and others. Roc Trade, ISBN 978-0-451-41900-2
- in As Red As Blood, As White As Snow in Cursed: An Anthology (2020) by Neil Gaiman, Charlie Jane Anders, M. R. Carey, Christina Henryand others. Titan Books, ISBN 978-1-78909-150-2
- in Pretty Maids All In a Row in Twice Cursed (2023) by Neil Gaiman, Joe Hill, Joanne Harris, M. R. Carey, Katherine Arden, Christina Henry und anderen. Titan Books, ISBN 978-1-80336-122-2

== Awards ==
Henry's Alice (2015) was among the best-selling science fiction and fantasy novels at Barnes & Noble in 2015. Near the Bone (2021) was nominated for the RUSA Awards - Horror Award in 2022.

Goodreads Choice Award Nominations

- Alice (2015) for Best Horror genre, second place
- Lost Boy (2017) for Best Horror genre, sixth place
- The Girl in Red (2019) for Best Horror genre, third place
- The Ghost Tree (2020) for Best Horror genre, 17th place
- Near the Bone (2021) for Best Horror genre, 14th place

== Personal life ==
Henry had always wanted to be a writer and commented that "I always wanted to be a writer, even when I was very young. I spent most of my time living inside books and I wanted to stay there for the rest of my life." She lives in Chicago, Illinois with her husband and son.
