= Peter and the Starcatchers =

2004 children's book by Dave Barry and Ridley Pearson

- First edition
- Author: Dave Barry; Ridley Pearson
- Illustrator: Greg Call
- Language: English
- Publisher: Hyperion Books for Children
- Publication date: 2004
- Media type: Print (Hardback & Paperback)
- Pages: 452 (hardcover edition)
- ISBN: 0-7868-5445-6
- OCLC: 56111836
- LC Class: PZ7.B278 Pe 2004
- Followed by: Peter and the Shadow Thieves

Peter and the Starcatchers is a children's novel that was published by Hyperion Books, a subsidiary of Disney, in 2004. Written by Dave Barry and Ridley Pearson, and illustrated by Greg Call, the book is a reinterpretation of the character Peter Pan, who first appeared in J. M. Barrie's novel The Little White Bird.

The book is followed by four sequels: Peter and the Shadow Thieves (2006), Peter and the Secret of Rundoon (2007), Peter and the Sword of Mercy (2009), and The Bridge to Never Land (2011). A series of Never Land chapter books for younger readers is based on the novels.

== Plot ==
In 19th century London, orphaned boys Peter, James, Thomas, Prentiss, and Tubby Ted are shipped out on the decrepit ship Never Land. While searching for food, Peter encounters a mysterious trunk and its guardian, Molly Aster, a girl about his age. Meanwhile, the feared pirate Black Stache hears of a similar trunk containing a great treasure on board another ship, the Wasp. Black Stache manages to run down and board the Wasp, and Leonard Aster, Molly's father, attempts and fails to escape with the trunk. Black Stache opens the trunk only to find it filled with sand. Black Stache and Aster realize that the trunk is a decoy and the treasure is on board the Never Land. Aster jumps overboard and escapes.

Molly tells Peter that the trunk contains "starstuff," magical dust of extraordinary power that falls from the heavens. Molly's family is revealed to be members of a secret society known as the Starcatchers, tasked with keeping Starstuff out of the wrong hands. Molly enlists Peter to assist in throwing the trunk overboard before Black Stache arrives.

Black Stache and his men race against a monster storm to intercept the Never Land. Attempting to dispose of the trunk with Molly, Peter is thrown overboard just as the storm hits. Having come into contact with Starstuff from the trunk, Peter flies back and hurls the trunk overboard. Molly and the orphans escape the Never Land and wash up on a nearby island.

All the children are captured by the local natives, known as the Mollusks, and their leader Fighting Prawn. The Mollusks decide to feed the children to Mister Grin, a large crocodile. Molly uses starstuff to help the group and Mister Grin to fly out of the enclosure. The trunk is found by the crew of the Never Land and its first mate, Slank. Slank reveals that he is in league with the Others, rivals of the Starcatchers who want the Starstuff for themselves.

Aster and a group of Starcatchers soon arrive on the Island, accompanied by ships of the British Navy, and Aster deduces that Peter has a high tolerance to Starstuff and instantly stops aging while retaining the ability to fly. The Mollusks and the pirates converge on the group, and a fight ensues, wherein Fighting Prawn is mortally wounded and Peter severs Black Stache's hand, which is eaten by Mister Grin.

Peter uses the starstuff in Aster's locket to save Fighting Prawn, who spares the group, allows the Starcatchers to leave the island with the starstuff, and lets the orphans stay on the island. As Peter and Molly bid farewell to one another, Aster uses starstuff to turn a bird into a fairy, Tinker Bell, to watch over Peter. Peter promises to come to London shortly to visit, and he and the boys begin to settle on the island. The story ends with Peter discovering a washed-up plank with the printed name of the Never Land, which he decides to nickname the island.

== Adaptations ==
In 2005, Disney hired Jay Wolpert to adapt the book to film, reportedly using 3D animation.

A play with music adaptation of the book debuted in winter 2009 at La Jolla Playhouse as part of an arrangement with Disney Theatrical. It was re-staged Off-Broadway in 2011 and opened on Broadway on April 15, 2012, at the Brooks Atkinson Theatre.

On May 17, 2012, Walt Disney Pictures announced that a film version of the book would be written by Jesse Wigutow. On August 20, 2012, The Hunger Games director Gary Ross agreed to direct the movie. Filming was expected to begin in 2013. As of 2026, nothing else is known to have taken place.
