= Peter and the Secret of Rundoon =

2007 novel by Dave Barry and Ridley Pearson

- First edition
- Author: Dave Barry; Ridley Pearson
- Illustrator: Greg Call
- Language: English
- Publisher: Hyperion Books
- Publication date: October 2007
- Publication place: United States
- Media type: Print (Hardback)
- Pages: 482 (hardcover edition)
- ISBN: 0-7868-3788-8
- OCLC: 104641169
- LC Class: PZ7.B278 Pde 2007
- Preceded by: Peter and the Shadow Thieves
- Followed by: Peter and the Sword of Mercy

Peter and the Secret of Rundoon is a children's novel that was published by Hyperion Books, a subsidiary of Disney, in 2007. Written by Dave Barry and Ridley Pearson, the book is an unauthorized reimagining of Peter Pan, or the Boy Who Wouldn't Grow Up by J. M. Barrie, and tells the story of an orphan named Peter. It was illustrated by artist Greg Call. It is a sequel to Barry and Pearson's Peter and the Starcatchers and Peter and the Shadow Thieves, best-sellers released in late 2004 and mid-2006. This book was released on October 23, 2007, and was described at the time as the last novel in the series. However, in May 2008 the writers announced a fourth book: Peter and the Sword of Mercy.

== Plot summary ==
The story starts at Stonehenge, where Lord Ombra was seemingly destroyed in Peter and the Shadow Thieves. Though weakened, he has regenerated his consciousness, using his power to possess others to gather himself together so that he can return to Rundoon.

Meanwhile, warriors of the Scorpion tribe plan to invade Mollusk Island. Warned by Peter, Fighting Prawn prepares for war. Eventually, however, he is forced to surrender to the overwhelming force of the invaders and the Mollusks are enslaved.

Molly and George travel to Oxford, where they discover some vital information about Peter's parents which suggests Peter himself is in danger. And indeed Lord Ombra and his fellow shadow creatures have decided that capturing Peter could help their plans. Lord Aster sails to Mollusk Island to warn and protect Peter, unaware that Molly and George have stowed away aboard his ship.

Peter, wounded by the Scorpions, is kidnapped by Captain Hook along with the Lost Boys, but soon they are all captured by Lord Ombra and taken to Rundoon. There they are imprisoned in the dungeons of King Zarboff III, a cruel and vain despot in cahoots with the shadow beings.

Tinker Bell joins Lord Aster in a rescue mission, but he is captured by Zarboff's men. Tink returns to the ship to warn Molly and George, but finds them trying to steal a camel and being chased by the owners. She tells Molly to use the starstuff in her locket to make the camel fly, and so they escaped and went on to find Peter, Lord Aster, and Bakari on their flying camel.

Zarboff reveals his plan – to shoot rockets into space to make starstuff fall. The first attempt is successful, and he plans another, using the new starstuff to send the rocket even further. He does not know that the shadow beings intend the second rocket to rupture the fabric of the universe and cause it to collapse into nothingness. It falls to Peter to prevent the rocket from reaching its destination.

By chance, the huge load of starstuff falls onto a ship stolen by George and the Lost Boys, causing it to float. The flying ship, expertly handled by Captain Hook, takes the whole party back to Mollusk Island, when Shining Pearl, Fighting Prawn's daughter, has joined forces with the pirates to repel the invaders.

The book ends with the Lost Boys deciding to return to London with Leonard, while some new boys, former St. Norbert's orphans enslaved by Zarboff, decide to take their place as the new Lost Boys. Molly and Peter share a kiss and then go their separate ways.

== Characters ==
Many of the characters from "Peter and the Secret of Rundoon" are characters from the previous novels. However, new characters were added to fit with the book's theme.

- Peter- Peter, because of exposure to starstuff, will never grow old and has gained the permanent ability to fly. He is believed to be the lost son of Mr. Pan (aka Mr. Starr), a watcher for the Starcatchers. Mr. Pan and his wife mysteriously went missing and Peter was sent to St. Norbert's.
- Tinker Bell- Tinker Bell is a fairy who was created from a bird which Lord Aster put in a bag of starstuff. She serves as the guardian of Peter. She is protective of Peter, and dislikes Peter paying attention to any other girl.
- Molly Aster- Molly, daughter to the great Starcatcher Leonard Aster, returns for this book.
- Lost Boys- James, Thomas, Prentiss, and Tubby Ted were originally orphans from "St. Norbert's Home for Wayward Boys". James is their leader when Peter is not around.
- Captain Hook- Captain Hook, formerly Black Stache, is a disgusting, filthy pirate, captain of the ship known as the "Jolly Roger". As his left hand was cut off by Peter, he replaced it with a bent dagger in the shape of a hook, earning his nickname.
- Lord Ombra- Lord Ombra is the returning villain in this novel, and Peter's archnemesis. He moves like liquid and is able to steal people's shadows or read their thoughts. Ombra is one of a group of alien shadow beings who are enemies of life and manipulate the human "Others" for their own ends.
- Captain Nerezza- Nerezza is captain of the ship Le Fantome, and he is one of the "Others" who wants starstuff for selfish motives.
- George Darling- George is Molly's London friend, and he will grow up to become the father of Wendy, John, and Michael. George has feelings for Molly, and is jealous of Peter, which amuses Molly. He is cautious but loyal and refuses to let Molly go into danger alone.
- Lord Leonard Aster and Lady Louise Aster- Molly's parents are Leonard and Louise Aster, who live in a mansion near Kensington Gardens. Molly's father is secretly one of the greatest Starcatchers. He is protective of the children, but reliant on their help.
- Bakari- A friendly Starcatcher who has contacts in Rundoon and accompanies Lord Aster on his journey across the desert. He gets his shadow temporarily removed by Lord Ombra.
- Smee- Captain Hook's rather thick-headed first mate. He is made captain after Hook goes missing. He admits that he makes a poor pirate, as he does not like to hurt anyone.
- King Zarboff III- The evil King of the Temple, who wants to fly. He eventually gets slowly eaten by his own pet snake, Kundalini.
- Kundalini- King Zarboff III's pet snake who eats men. He eventually swallows his master.
- Mr. Glotz- A scientist who works for Zarboff. He builds rockets to shoot down the stars so that King Zarboff III can collect starstuff. It is unknown as to what happened to him after the novel.
- Franklin- A monkey from the temple that was trained to pilot the rocket.
- The Mollusk Tribe- The residents of Mollusk Island.
- Shining Pearl- The daughter of Fighting Prawn, leader of the Mollusk Tribe.
- The Scorpion Tribe- A deadly tribe of the seas. Men are initiated as warriors of the tribe only if they can keep a poisonous jellyfish on their back for a minute without moving or crying out. Each member has the scar of the jellyfish on his back. They add poison to their arrowheads to incapacitate their prey.
- Mister Grin- An enormous crocodile that lives on Mollusk Island and craves human flesh, especially Captain Hook's.
- Slightly, Curly, Tootles, Nibs and the Twins/New Lost Boys- The St. Norbert's boys that Peter knew while he was still an orphan, who were sent to Rundoon as slaves. He is reunited with them all in Rundoon. Slightly has been there so long, he speaks Rundoon's language. After James, Thomas, Prentiss, and Tubby Ted leave for England, they become the new Lost Boys. These boys are the Lost Boys of the original play.
- Herky and Boggs Two pirates who assist Mr. Smee and Shining Pearl against the Scorpion Tribe.
