= Ridley Pearson =

American author

- Pearson in 2012
- Born: March 13, 1953 (age 73); Glen Cove, New York, U.S.
- Education: University of Kansas, Brown University
- Occupation: Author
- Years active: 1985
- Known for: Cut and Run, The Diary of Ellen Rimbuer, Parallel Lies, Chain of Evidence, Hard Fall, The Red Room, Choke Point, The Risk Agent
- Awards: Raymond Chandler – Fulbright Fellowship, Oxford, Quill Award – Missouri Writers Hall of Fame.
- Website: http://ridleypearson.com/

Ridley Pearson (born March 13, 1953) is an American author of suspense, thriller and adventure books. Several of his books have appeared on The New York Times Best Seller list.

== Literary career ==
Pearson became the first American to receive the Raymond Chandler-Fulbright Fellowship at Oxford University in 1991. He received the Quill Award from the Missouri Writers Hall of Fame, its highest honor. This award serves as a reminder of the importance of writing and encourages young people to develop their own joy for writing.

Pearson's novels for adults include: novels featuring characters John Knox & Grace Chu--The Red Room (2014);Choke Point (2013);The Risk Agent (2012); novels featuring the character Walt Fleming--In Harm's Way (2010), Killer Summer (2009), Killer View (2008), and Killer Weekend (2007); novels featuring the character Lou Boldt and Daphne Matthews--The Body of David Hayes (2004), The Art of Deception (2002), Middle of Nowhere (2000), The First Victim (1999), The Pied Piper (1998), Beyond Recognition (1997), No Witnesses (1994), The Angel Maker (1993), and Undercurrents (1988).

Standalone novels include: Cut and Run (2005), The Diary of Ellen Rimbauer (2001)--(under the nom-de-plume of Joyce Readon, Ph.D.), Parallel Lies (2001), Chain of Evidence (1995), Hard Fall (1992), Probable Cause (1990), The Seizing of Yankee Green Mall (1987), Blood of the Albatross (1986), and Never Look Back (1985). Ridley also wrote three Chris Klick mysteries under the pseudonym of Wendell McCall.

The Diary of Ellen Rimbauer: My Life at Rose Red was adapted as a film called The Diary of Ellen Rimbauer (2003)

To describe how Peter Pan met Captain Hook, Ridley teamed up with his long-time friend, humorist Dave Barry, to co-author Peter and the Starcatchers (2004), a prequel to Peter Pan; it is published in the US by Disney and by Walker Books in the UK. The novel was adapted as a play, Peter and the Starcatcher, written by Rick Elice, which premiered on Broadway at the Brooks Atkinson Theatre in early 2012, and earned the most Tony nominations of any play in history— nine. The play received five Tony awards at the ceremony on June 10, 2012. The play went on a national tour in 2013–14. Pearson and Barry have produced three additional prequels – Peter and the Shadow Thieves (2006), Peter and the Secret of Rundoon (2007), and Peter and the Sword of Mercy (2009). Another Peter-related book published by the duo is Bridge to Neverland (2011).

Also for Disney, Pearson has written a series of novels set inside Disney theme parks, called The Kingdom Keepers, in which five teenagers battle the Overtakers—the evil Disney villains—to keep the parks safe.

Pearson has also written Steel Trapp: The Challenge (2008) and Steel Trapp: The Academy (2010).

Also with Dave Barry, Ridley Pearson has written Science Fair (2008) and three Never Land books: Escape from the Carnivale (2006), Cave of the Dark Wind (2007), and Blood Tide (2008).

== Personal life ==
Pearson was raised in Riverside, Connecticut, along with his two siblings. He was educated at the University of Kansas and Brown University. He lived in Shanghai, China from 2008 to 2009. He currently lives in St. Louis, Missouri, with his wife and two daughters. Pearson often incorporates his children as characters into his children's novels.

He also has played bass guitar and sung for the Rock Bottom Remainders, a band of published authors that disbanded in June 2012.

== Published works ==
=== Suspense Novels ===
==== Standalone Novels ====
- Never Look Back. New York: St. Martin's Press. 1985. ISBN 0-312-56475-9. OCLC 11623964.
- Blood of the Albatross. New York: St. Martin's Press. 1986. ISBN 0-312-08448-X.
- The Seizing of Yankee Green Mall. New York: St. Martin's Press. 1987. ISBN 0-312-00703-5. (later republished as Hidden Charges)
- Probable Cause. New York: St Martin's Press. 1990. ISBN 0-312-03914-X.
- Hard Fall. New York: Delacorte Press. 1992. ISBN 0-385-30138-3.
- Chain of Evidence. New York: Hyperion. 1995. ISBN 0-7868-6172-X.
- as Joyce Reardon, Ph.D. (2001). The Diary Of Ellen Rimbauer. New York: Hyperion. ISBN 0-7868-6801-5.
- Parallel Lies. New York: Hyperion. 2001. ISBN 0-7868-6564-4.
- Cut and Run. New York: Hyperion. 2005. ISBN 0-7868-6726-4. OCLC 57422748.
- Hard Listening. Palo Alto: Coliloquy. (July 2013). An interactive e-book about his participation in a writer/musician band, the Rock Bottom Remainders.

==== Risk Agent Series ====
- The Risk Agent. New York: G.P. Putnam's Sons. 2012. ISBN 978-0-399-15883-4.
- Choke Point. New York: G.P. Putnam's Sons. 2013. ISBN 978-0-399-15884-1.
- The Red Room. New York: G.P. Putnam's Sons. 2014. ISBN 978-0-399-16374-6.
- White Bone. Penguin Publishing Group. 2016. ISBN 978-0-399-16375-3. OCLC 945793147.

==== Walt Fleming Series ====
- Killer Weekend. New York: G.P. Putnam's Sons. 2007. ISBN 978-0-399-15407-2.
- Killer View. New York: G.P. Putnam's Sons. 2008. ISBN 978-0-399-15505-5.
- Killer Summer. New York: Gale. 2009. ISBN 978-1-4104-1583-7.
- In Harm's Way. Detroit: Gale Cengage Learning. 2010. ISBN 978-1-4104-3277-3. OCLC 808145444.

==== Lou Boldt Series ====
- Undercurrents. Thorndike, ME: G.K. Hall. 1988. ISBN 978-0-7838-9185-9.
- The Angel Maker. New York: Delacorte Press. 1993. ISBN 978-0-385-30139-8. OCLC 26854893.
- No Witnesses. New York: Hyperion. 1994. ISBN 978-0-7868-6066-1.
- Beyond Recognition. New York: Hyperion. 1997. ISBN 978-0-7868-6240-5.
- The Pied Piper. New York: Hyperion. 1998. ISBN 978-0-7868-6300-6.
- The First Victim. New York: Hyperion. 1999. ISBN 978-0-7868-6440-9.
- Middle Of Nowhere. New York: Hyperion. 2000. ISBN 978-0-7868-6563-5.
- The Art Of Deception. New York: Hyperion. 2002. ISBN 978-0-7868-6724-0.
- The Body Of David Hayes. New York: Hyperion. 2004. ISBN 978-0-7868-6725-7.

==== Chris Klick Series (writing as Wendell McCall) ====
- Dead Aim. New York: St. Martin's Press. 1988. ISBN 978-0-312-02184-9.
- Aim For The Heart. Thorndike, ME: Center Point. 1990. ISBN 978-1-58547-142-3.
- Concerto In Dead Flat. Scottsdale, AZ: Poisoned Pen Press. 1999. ISBN 978-1-890208-18-9. OCLC 41876268.

=== The Kingdom Keepers ===
- The Syndrome – New York : Disney Hyperion (2015)
- The Insider – New York: Disney Hyperion (2014)
- Dark Passage – New York: Disney Hyperion (2013)
- Shell Game – New York: Disney Hyperion (2012)
- Power Play – New York: Disney Hyperion (2011)
- Disney In Shadow – New York: Disney Editions (2010)
- Disney at Dawn – New York: Disney Editions (2008)
- Disney After Dark – New York: Disney Editions. Sunshine State Young Readers Award 2009, Grade 6–8 winner (2005)

=== Peter and the Starcatchers ===
- The Bridge to Neverland (with Dave Barry) (2011)
- Peter and the Sword of Mercy (with Dave Barry) (2009)
- Peter and the Secret of Rundoon (with Dave Barry) (2007)
- Peter and the Shadow Thieves (with Dave Barry) (2006)
- Peter and the Starcatchers (with Dave Barry) (2004) – New York: Disney Editions

=== Never Land chapter books ===
- Blood Tide (with Dave Barry) (2008)
- Cave Of The Dark Wind (with Dave Barry) (2007)
- Escape From The Carnivale (with Dave Barry) (2006)

The Return (Kingdom Keepers Spin-Off)

- The Return: Disney Lands (2015)
- The Return: Legacy of Secrets (2016)
- The Return: Disney at Last (2017)

=== Lock and Key Series ===
- The Initiation (2016)
- The Downward Spiral (2017)
- The Final Step (2018)
- The Gladwell Incident Short Story (2016)

=== Steel Trapp ===
- Steel Trapp: The Academy (2010)
- Steel Trapp: The Challenge – New York: Disney Editions (2008)

=== Other ===
- Science Fair (with Dave Barry) – New York: Disney Editions (2008)
