= Lost Boys (Peter Pan) =

Fictional characters

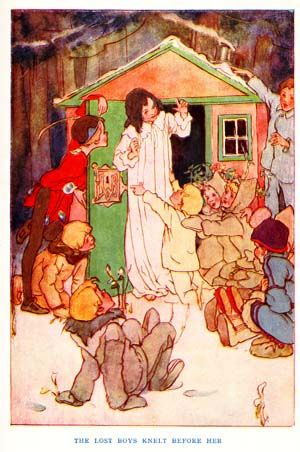
- The Lost Boys and Peter Pan after building a house for Wendy. Illustration by Alice B. Woodward.
- First appearance: Peter Pan, or The Boy Who Wouldn't Grow Up (1904)
- Created by: J. M. Barrie

In-universe information
- Home world: Neverland
- Type: Puer aeternus
- Distinctions: Children (usually all male)

The Lost Boys are characters from J. M. Barrie's 1904 play Peter Pan, or The Boy Who Wouldn't Grow Up and later adaptations and extensions to the story. They are boys "who fall out of their prams when the nurse is looking the other way and if they are not claimed in seven days, they are sent far away to Neverland," where Peter Pan is their captain.

There are no "lost girls" because as Peter explains, girls are far too clever to fall out of their prams. This was changed for the 2023 Disney reboot film Peter Pan & Wendy where the Lost Boys (still named as such) now include girls.

== Original Lost Boys ==
- Tootles is described as the most unfortunate and humblest of the band, because "the big things" and adventures happen while "he has stepped round the corner." This however has not soured but sweetened his nature. He is the one who shoots Wendy with a bow and arrow after Tinker Bell tells them that Wendy is a bird that Peter wanted killed. When Tootles realises his mistake, he asks Peter to kill him. Wendy however survives, and Tootles is spared. Tootles is the first to defend Wendy when she wants to return to London. When Peter takes possession of the Jolly Roger, Captain Hook's pirate ship, Tootles takes Smee's place as boatswain. At the end of the novel, he returns to London with Wendy and the other Lost Boys and eventually grows up to become a judge.
- Nibs is described as happy and debonair, possibly the bravest Lost Boy. The only thing he remembers about his mother is that she always wanted a cheque book and says he would love to give her one — if he knew what it was. He grows up to work in an office.
- Slightly is described as the most conceited of the boys, because he believes that he remembers what life was like before he was "lost". However, most of his "memories" are based on misunderstandings: he claims to know what his last name is because his pinafore had the words "Slightly Soiled" written on the tag. Slightly is a poor make-believer, but he does seem to have a talent for music; he is described as cutting whistles and flutes from the branches of trees and dancing to tunes he creates himself. He grows up to marry into nobility and become a lord.
- Curly is described by Barrie as "a pickle" (a person who gets into pickles) and has curly hair. Like Nibs, Curly grows up to work in an office.
- The Twins — First and Second Twin know little about themselves as they are not allowed to because Peter Pan does not know what Twins are, and no Lost Boy is allowed to know anything that Peter does not. Like Nibs and Curly, the Twins grow up to work in an office.

== Adaptations in literature ==
=== Peter and the Starcatchers ===
In the Peter and the Starcatchers series, an earlier group of Lost Boys include boys whom Peter knew from St. Norbert's orphanage and who return to England at the end of the prequels. This description does not concord with the canon backstory for the Lost Boys, who are not orphaned, but lost as babies.

- Prentiss — A rather new boy at St. Norbert's.
- James — James seems to be closer to Peter than any other boy at St. Norbert's. He serves as the leader to the Lost Boys when Peter is not around, making him the second-in-command.
- Tubby Ted — As a running gag, Tubby Ted is always hungry.
- Thomas — A boy from St. Norbert's.

In Peter and the Secret of Rundoon, some other boys from St. Norbert's, who used to be slaves for King Zarboff, end up going to Neverland with Peter. They have the same names as J. M. Barrie's original Lost Boys. By the end of the novel, Prentiss, James, Tubby Ted, and Thomas decide to go back to London with Leonard Aster because they realize they would become men some day and cannot keep up with Peter forever. They leave for the real world and all grow up. Peter and Tinker Bell take in the new, more familiar Lost Boys. However, Peter is reunited with James, who has grown up, in the fourth novel, Peter and the Sword of Mercy.

=== Peter Pan in Scarlet ===
In Peter Pan in Scarlet, Tootles becomes a girl because he only has daughters to borrow clothes from in order to become a child again and go back to Neverland. He finds his father, who is a judge, too.

Nibs is the only Lost Boy not to return to Neverland because he cannot bear the thought of leaving his children. Because of this he also is the only one who never meets his real parents, stays an orphan and has no chance to learn anything of his earlier life.

Slightly plays the clarinet and saves the day a couple of times with his music. Slightly grows up to marry a noblewoman and becomes a lord, though he has become a widower at the age of thirty and is the only one of the Lost Boys not to father any children. He gets tricked by the new enemy when he returns to Neverland and grows up, much to Peter's anger. Thanks to his love for music he finds his real mother and after returning to London he is the only Lost Boy who does not return to his adult age, but stays eighteen and stays with his mother.

Curly has become a doctor and is the owner of one of Nana's great-great-puppies, which travels with him to Neverland. He is the one who gives up his youth and childhood to save Peter's life.

The Twins have grown up to work in an office and their names are revealed to be Marmaduke and Binky. They find their mother and take her back to their house in London.

== Adaptations in film ==
=== Disney's Peter Pan films ===
Peter Pan with the Lost Boys, depicted in the 1953 film.

In their appearances in the Disney franchise, the Lost Boys are often named after their animal costumes: Fox/Slightly (voiced by Simon Singer in the first film, Quinn Beswick in the second film, Mason Cotton in Kingdom Hearts Birth by Sleep, portrayed by Noah Matthews Matofsky in the 2023 film), Rabbit/Nibs (voiced by Jeffrey Silver in the first film, Bradley Pierce in the second film, portrayed by Sebastian Billingsley-Rodriguez), Bear/Cubby (voiced by Robert Ellis in the first film, Spencer Breslin in the second film, Wally Wingert in Kingdom Hearts Birth by Sleep and Kinect: Disneyland Adventures, Rachel Bloom in Chip 'n Dale: Rescue Rangers, and portrayed by Florence Bensberg in the 2023 film), Skunk/Tootles (unvoiced in the first and second film, portrayed by Caelan Edie in the 2023 film), and the Raccoons/Twins (voiced by Johnny McGovern in the first film, Aaron Spann in the second film, portrayed by Skyler and Kelsey Yates in the 2023 film).

In Peter Pan (1953), the Boys play smaller roles. They are less characterized and do not have names, appearing more as a group than individuals. In Return to Never Land, they are named as their original counterparts (with the exception of Cubby). Tootles is silent in both films, using a pad and pencil to communicate in the latter film.

Cubby and Slightly appear alongside Peter Pan and Tinker Bell in Kingdom Hearts Birth by Sleep. Before that, the Lost Boys appeared in the Kingdom Hearts comics as they are seen fighting over treasure.

Cubby made a minor appearance in Kinect Disneyland Adventures as he was kidnapped by Captain Hook, and forced to reveal Peter Pan's hideout. Cubby was released after Peter Pan fought Hook.

Cubby appeared in a cameo in Chip 'n Dale: Rescue Rangers. When he runs into Peter Pan in his Sweet Pete appearance while chasing after Chip and Dale, Cubby noted that Peter got old, while Cubby on the other hand remained young.

In the 2023 live-action remake Peter Pan & Wendy, the Lost Boys are depicted as being more diverse. The Lost Boys now include Chinese-American girl Birdie (portrayed by Diana Tsoy) and Latino boy Bellwether (portrayed by Felix De Sousa) who are exclusive to the film. Alongside Tiger Lily, they meet Wendy after she was separated from her brothers and Peter Pan following a cannonball attack from Captain Hook's ship. By the end of the film, they return to England with the Darling children, as in J.M. Barrie's original Peter Pan story.

=== Spielberg's Hook ===
In Steven Spielberg's sequel Hook (1991), there is an army of Lost Boys of various ethnicities living in Neverland, whose clothes suggest they left various civilizations at different times over the past century. They live in a giant tree on a tall rocky outcropping just offshore of the island. Two original twins, named Sooner & Later, are seen wearing Boy Scout uniforms from the early twentieth century. Tootles, of the original six lost boys, appeared as grown old man, still living in Wendy's house. Slightly, Curly, Nibs, and the Twins were either mentioned or referenced, and their names were seen on the door of Wendy's house within the Lost Boys' home.

The Lost Boys named in the film are:

- Rufio (portrayed by Dante Basco)
- Thud Butt (portrayed by Raushan Hammond)
- Pockets (portrayed by Isaiah Robinson)
- Ace (portrayed by Jasen Fisher)
- Don't Ask (portrayed by James Madio)
- Too Small (portrayed by Thomas Tulak)
- Latchboy (portrayed by Alex Zuckerman)
- No Nap (portrayed by Ahmad Stoner)
- Noseminer (portrayed by René González Jr.)
- Sooner & Later (portrayed by Brett & Brian Willis)

The boys are led by Rufio, who was hand-chosen by Peter as leader when he left Neverland to grow up as "Peter Banning." Initially, Rufio refuses to believe that Peter Banning is their former leader, as do most of the boys. However, Tinker Bell and the glimpse of Peter Pan that Pockets sees in Banning's face convince them and they train him for a showdown with Captain Hook. The Lost Boys gradually come to believe in Peter, a turning point being when he manages to beat Rufio in a heated name-calling match. When Peter finally relearns how to fly, Rufio finally recognizes Peter is indeed Peter Pan and gives Peter the sword as a sign of apology and respect. The Lost Boys follow Peter into a climactic battle with Captain Hook and the pirates, armed with improvised childlike weapons. Defying Peter's orders to leave Hook for him, Rufio valiantly takes on Hook while Peter rescues his daughter, Maggie. Despite putting up a good fight, Rufio is fatally stabbed by Hook, and dies in Peter's arms while admitting that his wish was to have a father like Peter. Peter's son Jack, witnessing Rufio's death at the hands of Hook, turns away from the life of a pirate and reconciles with his father. Peter and Hook engage in a duel which culminates in Hook apparently being eaten alive by the momentarily resurrected crocodile that had eaten Hook's hand long ago. Before leaving Neverland, Peter selects Thud Butt to be their new leader, telling him "I want you to take care of everyone who is smaller than you," to which Thud Butt agrees.

Tootles, one of the original lost boys from the original tale, appears as an old man, portrayed by Arthur Malet. He was one of the many "orphans" whom Granny Wendy is said to have found homes for over the decades. Tootles now lives with Wendy because she could not bear to send him to a retirement home. However, he is the first to recognise that Hook has arrived in London and witnesses him abduct the children. Tootles also knows that Peter Banning is Peter Pan and remembers him just as much as Granny Wendy. After Peter and his family arrive at Wendy's house, Peter sees him crawling on the floor and he explains "I've lost my marbles," which Peter Banning readily agrees with. Later in Neverland, Thud Butt gives Peter a small bag containing Tootles' marbles, revealing that they were his happy thoughts and he lost them literally rather than metaphorically. Once Peter and his children return home, Peter gives Tootles his marbles. With the help of some fairy dust that spills out of the bag, a delighted and rejuvenated Tootles flies out of the window to return to Neverland.

Though completely absent, the rest of the original lost boys (Slightly, Curly, Nibs, and Twins) were mentioned or referenced in the film, and their names, along with Wendy, John, Michael, and Peter's, are seen carved in the doorway of the Lost Boys old hideout. Presumably, they left Neverland with Tootles and the Darling Children and grew up as in the original tale.

=== P.J. Hogan's Peter Pan ===
In the 2003 film Peter Pan, the Lost Boys appear with their original names. They are played by:

- Theodore Chester as Slightly
- Rupert Simonian as Tootles
- George MacKay as Curly
- Harry Eden as Nibs
- Patrick and Lachlan Gooch as Twins.

In the film, the characters retain their personalities. In the end, all of them are adopted by Mr. and Mrs. Darling, like in the original play, except Slightly, who instead is adopted by Aunt Millicent.

=== Other films ===
The title of the 1987 film The Lost Boys is a reference to Peter Pan's Lost Boys. In the film, the characters retain their youth and gain their powers, including flying, by becoming vampires.

The Lost Boys appear in the beginning and the end of Pan (2015). The boys originated from an orphanage where they were sold and kidnapped by Blackbeard and the pirates for slavery to mine pixum. In the end, Peter rescues Nibs and many other boys from an orphanage so they can have some "fun". They are pulled on to the flying Jolly Roger and Hook refers to them as "Lost Boys."

== Adaptations in television ==
The Lost Boys appear in the second and third seasons of Once Upon a Time. They are the murderous inhabitants of Neverland and servants of Peter Pan (portrayed by Robbie Kay).

The names of Wendy and the Lost Boys, (Slightly, Curly, Tootles and Nibs) are given to the hybrids in the television series Alien: Earth which premiered in August 2025.
