= The Bridge to Never Land =

2011 novel by Ridley Pearson and Dave Barry

- First edition
- Author: Dave Barry; Ridley Pearson
- Cover artist: Greg Call
- Language: English
- Publisher: Disney-Hyperion Books
- Publication place: United States
- Media type: Print (Hardback)
- Pages: 438 (hardcover edition)
- ISBN: 1423160290
- Preceded by: Peter and the Sword of Mercy

The Bridge to Never Land is a children's novel written by Ridley Pearson and Dave Barry and published by Disney-Hyperion in 2011. It is the fifth book in the Peter and the Starcatchers series but unlike the others is set in the present day. The main characters in the story are two young Americans, Aidan and Sarah Cooper.

== Plot ==
One day Aidan Cooper and Sarah Cooper discover a secret compartment in their father's massive oak desk. There was a small hidden door in the desk, inside was an envelope that contains a piece of very thin, almost translucent, white paper, on which, handwritten in black ink, are a series of seemingly random lines; among them are what appear to be fragments of letters, but not enough to make sense. At the bottom of the page is a verse about Peter Pan and a reference to a real hotel in London.

As it happens, the Copper family is about to embark on a trip to Europe, so the children decide that while in London, they will try to locate the hotel. After some careful sleuthing, they manage to discover its location, and once inside, they find another clue. The Bridge to Never Land takes Sarah and Aidan on a quest that challenges them to solve a series of puzzles, which gradually convince them that Peter Pan is not fiction after all. They discover what happened to the remainder of the starstuff cache that Molly and Peter fought to protect many years ago. They also find out that in the early twentieth century, Molly and the other Starcatchers embarked on one last great mission to find a way to protect Never Land, a mystical island with magical creatures and a precious starstuff supply, from the increasingly intrusive outside world.

== Characters ==
Sarah Cooper: A seventeen-year-old girl who is very adventurous. She committed herself through the journey to not let the starstuff fall into the hands of the evil Ombra. She can be very sarcastic, and has a very useful quality: she has a black belt in karate.

Aidan Cooper: A fifteen-year-old boy who falls in love every week. He is one to stay out of trouble, thinking of consequences and the turnout, but is always led into trouble by his older sister, Sarah. Though she nearly causes him to get killed many times, he still loves her.

J.D. Aster: A young college professor in his early twenties, J.D. is the last living Aster, and the last living Starcatcher. Unsure of his fate, he steps up to help Sarah and Aidan protect the starstuff and keep it away from Ombra. He pretty much made the whole thing happen.

Peter Pan: Stuck at the age of 13 forever, Peter lives in Never Land, as he has for over 100 years. He has always been ready to help the Starcatchers, and though reluctant to help Sarah and J.D., he goes back to earth with them. He is described as “A young boy with a wild tousle of red hair, a thin, extravagantly freckled face and upturned nose.”

Tinker Bell: As always, this little "birdwoman" is at Peter's side through all of his part of the journey. She always has a sarcastic rude remark ready for anyone she does not like. She does not like any female who she thinks will get between her and Peter, therefore she calls them rude names, such as "fat cow" or "ugly girl."

Lord Ombra: Ombra, the main villain in the series, returns in this book as a flock of big black birds. He has been severely damaged because of his fights with Peter throughout the series. Lord Ombra is split into the birds, so if one is killed, he still has more lives. He still maintains his ability to take over people's mind by stealing their shadows and finding info.

Captain Hook: Captain Hook is a pirate captain who is stuck on Never Land. He yearns to get off the island. He used to be called Black "Stache" Moustache. He desires starstuff so he can again become the most feared on the seven seas. He hates Peter for cutting off his hand, now only a stump covered by his razor hook. He is also terrified of "Mister Grin", a huge crocodile.

Mr Magill: Mr Magill, who appeared in previous volumes, he is posthumously referenced. He owns wolves and a bear. He is a Starcatcher who helped Peter, and other Starcatchers. He is the one who hid the paper mentioned at the beginning of Bridge to Neverland, the paper which starts the whole adventure. His wolves are the ancestors of the wolves in the cave that has the starstuff hidden in it.

Albert Einstein: Einstein is a famous German physicist, discoverer of the Theory of Relativity. In the prologue, Einstein is recruited by the Starcatchers to create an Einstein-Rosen Bridge (the "Bridge" of the title) which seals Never Land off from the outside world. A secret history of Einstein's connection to Never Land is one of the novel's driving themes.

== Reception ==
Publishers Weekly finds that "The book's joyful sense of adventure and wonder is tempered somewhat by the constant pursuit of authorities and parental figures, as well as scenes set in Disney World that seem to be designed to remind readers that runaway children are serious business in this day and age." while Kirkus Reviews notes that "While the authors take obvious delight in referencing their popular series, no prior knowledge is necessary in order to enjoy this rollicking page-turner."

== See also ==
- Dave Barry
- Ridley Pearson
- Peter and the Starcatchers
