= Peter and the Sword of Mercy =

2009 novel by Dave Barry and Ridley Pearson

- First edition
- Author: Dave Barry; Ridley Pearson
- Illustrator: Greg Call
- Language: English
- Publisher: Disney-Hyperion Books
- Publication date: October 13, 2009
- Publication place: United States
- Media type: Print (Hardback)
- Pages: 528 (hardcover edition)
- ISBN: 1-4231-2134-1
- OCLC: 999475389
- Preceded by: Peter and the Secret of Rundoon
- Followed by: The Bridge to Never Land

Peter and the Sword of Mercy is a children's novel that was published by Hyperion Books, a subsidiary of Disney, in 2009. Written by Dave Barry and Ridley Pearson, the book is an unauthorized reimagining of characters and situations from Peter Pan, or the Boy Who Wouldn't Grow Up by J. M. Barrie, and tells the story of an orphan named Peter. It was illustrated by artist Greg Call. It is a sequel and fourth installment to Barry and Pearson's "Starcatchers" series, best-sellers released in 2004–2007, which was originally said at the time to be a trilogy. This book was released on October 13, 2009. The next book, called The Bridge to Never Land, was published in 2011.

== Plot summary ==
The story is set in 1902, 23 years after the events of Peter and the Secret of Rundoon. Molly Aster, now Molly Darling, is married to George Darling and a mother of three: Wendy, John, and Michael. Her mother Louise has been deceased for a while and her father Leonard is very ill. One evening, she is visited by one of the original Lost Boys: James, who now works for Scotland Yard. He informs Molly about his suspicions with Baron von Schatten, an advisor to Prince Albert Edward. James thinks von Schatten is being controlled by Lord Ombra, but Molly brushes it off as foolishness, saying that Ombra was destroyed at Rundoon. Along with this, the Starcatchers started disbanding since the incident. James tells her he will come back the next night, giving her some time to think the whole thing over, as he has nowhere else to turn.

Meanwhile, on Mollusk Island, four men known as McPherson, O'Neal, Kelly and DeWulf wash up on shore in a boat. They claim to have been lost at sea for a few weeks, but Chief Fighting Prawn becomes suspicious when he says that they look like they were out at sea for a few days. He and Peter keep a close eye on the four men, especially O'Neal.

Back in London, Molly has waited three days, and James has still not returned. She starts to fear that he might be in real danger. Anxious to find out what is going on, Molly goes to the Scotland Yard, only to be told by his employer, Blake, that he is on vacation. Puzzled, Molly returns home and is almost grabbed by a bobby on the Underground. George is not too pleased when she tells him her story. He fears that he could lose his job due to a minor incident like this. Molly decides to talk to Wendy about the Starcatchers, knowing that her daughter is the only one who could understand. So, after Molly tells her daughter that she is actually in the Starcatchers, Molly sets off to her father's house, hoping to find some answers. But she, too, mysteriously disappears.

Meanwhile, a hideous man-like monster named The Skeleton, one of the "Others" that can cause pain with but a mere touch, looks for the missing tip of the sword Curtana - a.k.a. the Sword of Mercy. He finds it in a church window, disguised as a bishop's miter.

To keep his children safe, George sends them to stay in Cambridgeshire with Neville Plonk-Fenster, an inventor and their uncle. At Uncle Neville's place, Wendy is able to get an ornithopter, one of her uncle's inventions and uses it to find Peter. Before this, she visits her grandfather, Leonard Aster, who tells her to seek out Peter. Before he loses consciousness, he tells her to "confess". Wendy is confused, though, as she has no clue as to what he meant.

In Molly's prison, she notices that men pass her prison every day. She believes they have been digging because of their dirty appearance.

Wendy finally finds Peter on Mollusk Island with the help of some porpoises leading her through the ocean one at a time in the right direction. She convinces him to come back to England with her to stop the "Others."

In order to return Wendy to England, Fighting Prawn devises a plan to help Captain Hook resurrect the sunken flying ship from the previous novel (which no longer flies) so Hook can use it to return to piracy and deliver Wendy to England. After the ship is pulled from the sea Fighting Prawn threatens Hook that if he does not bring Wendy to England, he will hunt him down, bring him back to the Island, and feed him to the Islands giant crocodile named Mister Grin. At Fighting Prawns' request, Hook agrees to bring the four shipwrecked men with him in order to get them off the island. Unknown to Hook, Peter stows away on the ship by hiding in its rolled up sails so he can also arrive in London to help Wendy. Since he thinks Peter is dead, Hook does not suspect him to be on his ship.

When Hook tries to attack a steam ship, Peter, Wendy, and Tinker Bell fly to the steam ship when it collides with the Jolly Roger (the name Hook gives to the recently resurrected ship) at the same time the four shipwrecked sailors escape their cell and leave in a lifeboat unseen by the pirates. From here, they paddle back to Mollusk Island to complete their mission to grab the large cache of starstuff from the island. Peter and Wendy are taken back to London once they are discovered as stowaways aboard the steam ship.

Arriving at the Island, McPherson, O'Neal, Kelly, and DeWulf make a smoke signal with vegetation and a lava pit in order to signal their own ship, the Nimbus, to come to the Island.

Upon arriving in London, Wendy, Peter and Tinker Bell escape the police with the help of some rats (whom Tinker Bell can speak to), and from there travel to Lord Asters' house where, after avoiding bobbies watching the house, meet up with John, Michael, Neville, Mrs. Bumbrake, and Lord Aster.

After defeating Lord Ombra and the "Others", Molly returns home with Wendy, where they are reunited with George, John, and Michael. The story ends with Wendy telling her brothers about Peter Pan and hearing a strange noise from the window as Wendy starts her story.

== Characters ==
Peter: Peter is a boy who is stuck between the ages of 12 and 14 forever. He lives on Mollusk Island, where another of the main characters, Wendy, finds him and begs for his help. He is reluctant to come but something inside him wills Peter to do so. He is at one point touched by the Skeleton and has the severe pain it is able to cause inflicted on him. After this encounter, he attempts to avoid the Skeleton for the rest of the journey. He has feelings for Molly and is troubled when he learns that she married George.

Tinker Bell Tinker Bell is a fairy or "birdwoman". Who dislikes most females capable of "getting between her and Peter, especially Molly". She can be jealous and is very protective of Peter.

The Skeleton The Skeleton is some sort of Man Monster that can inflict severe pain with just a touch of his claw like hand. He is working with the "Others". He kills Lord Aster. He is killed on the flying train at the end of the novel. He is on a mission to acquire the tip of Curtana aka "The Sword of Mercy".

Baron von Schatten Baron von Schatten is an evil baron who is possessed with Lord Ombra. He also works with the "Others". He is electrocuted and killed. Ombra survives and comes out of him. He is severely weakened on the flying train near the end of the novel.

Wendy Darling Wendy is a girl at age 11 and is the daughter of Molly Aster and George Darling. After her mother disappears, she finds Peter and together they go to defeat the "Others". She loves her mother and does not approve when Molly tries to sacrifice herself in order to stop the "Others". Wendy also has come to enjoy telling her brother about Peter Pan by the end of the story.

James Smith James is one of the former Lost Boys and has now grown up. He works for Scotland Yard. He is the first to realize that Lord Ombra has returned and is captured by the "Others", along with Molly. He is a friend of Peters. He is cut on the head by von Schatten near the end of the book but he survives.

Molly Aster Molly Aster is wife of George Daring and the mother of Wendy, John, and Michael. She is captured by the "Others" after she tries to search for James. Due to her past romantic feelings for Peter, she is glad to see him when he comes to help. She plans to sacrifice herself to stop the "Others".

John and Michael John and Michael are the younger brothers of Wendy. John is 7 and Michael is 4. John consistently calls Michael a "ninny". They squabble a lot.

George Darling George is Molly's husband and the father of Wendy, John, and Michael. He is captured along with Molly and James by the "Others". He somewhat dislikes Peter, due to the romantic feelings that Peter and Molly have for each other.

Neville Plonk-Fenster Neville is the uncle of Wendy, John, and Michael. He is an inventor and, despite having limited success at his inventions, is still an intelligent man when it comes to science. He often gets caught up in his inventions and becomes oblivious to the rest of the world, but does not hesitate to help defeat the "Others" with his friends. His scientific knowledge proves valuable throughout the novel.

Simon Revile Revile is one of the Baron's workers. He is afraid of the Baron. He wants to save his own skin more than anything. He is afraid of the Skeleton as well.

Scarlett Johns Johns is one of the Skeleton's acquaintances. She is afraid of both the Baron and the Skeleton. She wants to save her own skins more than anything like Revile.

Fighting Prawn Fighting Prawn is the chief of the Mollusk tribe on Mollusk Island. He is a good friend and somewhat of a mentor to Peter. While Peter is in London, Fighting Prawn deals with Captain Narezza and his men when they attempt to steal the Islands starstuff.

Mr Magill Mr Magill is a Starcatcher who provides a shelter for Wendy, Peter, Neville, John, Michael, and Molly's previous tutor, Mrs Bumbrake. He owns a bear and several tame wolves. He also comes into Peter and the Shadow Thieves and is mentioned in Bridge to Neverland.

King Edward VII The uncrowned Monarch of Great Britain. Lord Ombra has Edward under his hypnotic spell, and plans to use Edward's impending coronation to stage a coup that will put the British Empire within Ombra's power.

Captain Nerezza: An agent of the Others who posed a threat to Peter in the second book and is attacking Neverland through the use of spies. He and his henchman Cheeky O'Neal are eaten by Mr. Grin.

Cheeky O'Neal, Rufus Kelly, Frederick DeWulf, and Angus McPherson: Four castaways who arrive in Neverland and turns out to be spies sent by Nerezza. O'Neal is in charge of the group, and the others are terrified of him.
