= David Peterson (disambiguation) =

David Peterson is a Canadian politician.

David Peterson may also refer to:

- David Peterson (baseball) (born 1995), baseball player
- David C. Peterson (born 1949), American photographer
- D. J. Peterson (1959–1993), American professional wrestler
- David J. Peterson (born 1981), American language creator
- David McKelvey Peterson (1894–1919), American World War I flying ace
- David G. Peterson (born 1944), biblical scholar
- David L. Peterson (born 1954), research biologist
- David A. M. Peterson (born 1973), American political scientist
- Dave Peterson (ice hockey) (1931–1997), American ice hockey coach
- Dave Peterson (runner), winner of the 1969 4 × 880 yard relay at the NCAA Division I Indoor Track and Field Championships

== See also ==
- David Paterson (born 1954), governor of New York State
- David Petersen (disambiguation)
- Dave Petersen, English rugby league footballer
