= Justice Foster =

Justice Foster may refer to:

- Arthur B. Foster (1872–1958), associate justice of the Alabama Supreme Court
- Dwight Foster (politician, born 1828) (1828–1884), judge of the Massachusetts Supreme Judicial Court
- Enoch Foster (1839–1913), justice of the Supreme Judicial Court of Maine
- Harry Ellsworth Foster (1898–1962), associate justice of the Washington Supreme Court
- Henry A. Foster (1800–1889), ex officio judge of the New York Court of Appeals
- Lafayette S. Foster (1806–1880), associate justice of the Connecticut Supreme Court
- Peter Foster (judge) (1912–1985), justice of the High Court of justice of England
- Robert Foster (judge) (1589–1663), chief justice of the King's Bench.
- Sydney F. Foster (1893–1973), judge of the New York Court of Appeals
- William Lawrence Foster (1823–1897), associate justice of the New Hampshire Supreme Court
- William P. Foster (swindler) (fl. 1810s), swindler who was appointed associate justice of the Supreme Court of Illinois, but never served

== See also ==
- Judge Foster (disambiguation)
