= Ate my balls =

Early internet meme

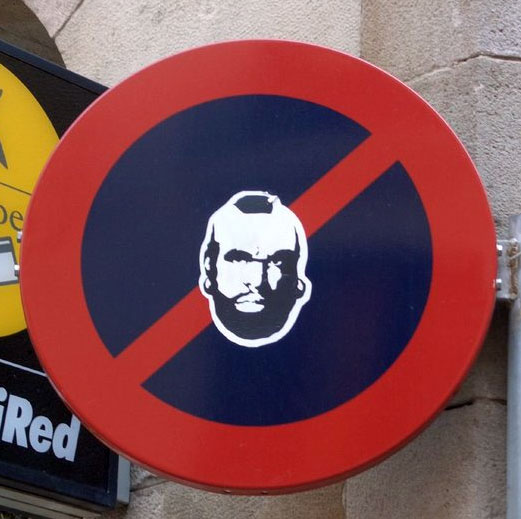
Mr. T Ate My Balls

"Ate my balls" is one of the earliest examples of an internet meme. It was widely shared in the late 1990s when adherents created web pages to depict a particular celebrity, fictional character, or other subject's zeal for eating testicles. Often, the site would consist of a humorous fictitious story or comic featuring edited photos about the titular individual; the photo editing was often crude and featured the character next to comic-book style speech in a thought balloon.

== History ==
The fad was started in 1996 by Nehal Patel, a student at University of Illinois at Urbana-Champaign with a "Mr. T Ate My Balls" web page. Later, the meme also featured subjects like Chewbacca, Monica Lewinsky, Mr. Spock, Britney Spears, Pokémon, eBay, and Mexican archaeology, among others. The meme became so popular that a related webring was created and a company registered the atemyballs.com domain in hopes of selling it for profit. In 2000, the Miami Herald noted that Patel's original website had received over 800,000 hits. Dave Barry covered the "Ate my balls" phenomenon in his 1996 book Dave Barry in Cyberspace. The meme's popularity waned after 2000 and it eventually fell out of popular use after most of the websites featuring it were deleted, often due to the shutdown of early free web hosts such as GeoCities.

In 2008, artist Drew briefly revived it by creating a website called "Andrew Zimmern Ate My Balls"; a reference to the host of Bizarre Foods with Andrew Zimmern, which often features cooked animal testicles as culinary dishes.

The "Ate my balls" meme was referenced in the 2009 legal dispute Beck v. Eiland-Hall, as an example of legally protected parody.

== See also ==
- List of Internet phenomena
