= CVN =

CVN may refer to:

- Cohen Veterans Network, a not-for-profit series of mental health clinics for veterans and military families.
- Central venous nutrition, in parenteral nutrition
- Cable Value Network, a 1980s cable shopping channel, purchased in 1989 by QVC
- Charpy V-notch Number (Charpy Energy), the output of a Charpy impact test
- Card Verification Number for credit cards (3 or 4 digits on the back or front of the card)
- Courtroom View Network, a media company that webcasts trials
- The constellation Canes Venatici, CVn, standard astronomical abbreviation
- CVN (Aircraft Carrier, Nuclear), a United States Navy hull classification symbol for nuclear aircraft carriers
- Crime Victim Notification (computerised system)
- Countervandalism Network, a network of volunteers dedicated to reducing vandalism on Wikimedia Foundation wikis
- Clovis Municipal Airport, an airport located in Clovis, New Mexico with IATA code CVN
- Chinese VLBI Network, a network of large antennas and part of European VLBI Network
