= Beck v. Eiland-Hall =

Lawsuit filed by political commentator Glenn Beck against Isaac Eiland-Hall

- WIPO headquarters in Geneva
- Court: World Intellectual Property Organization
- Full case name: Mercury Radio Arts, Inc. and Glenn Beck v. Isaac Eiland-Hall
- Decided: October 29, 2009
- Citation: WIPO Case No. D2009-1182
- Transcript: Beck v. Eiland-Hall

Court membership
- Judge sitting: Frederick M. Abbott (arbitrator)

Case opinions
- Complaint denied.

Keywords
- Defamation, Freedom of speech, Parody, Political satire, Satire, Trademark

Beck v. Eiland-Hall was a case filed in 2009 before the World Intellectual Property Organization (WIPO), a United Nations agency. It was filed by political commentator Glenn Beck against Isaac Eiland-Hall, concerning the website "GlennBeckRapedAndMurderedAYoungGirlIn1990.com". Eiland-Hall created the site as a parody to express the view that Beck's commentary style challenged his guests to prove a negative. The site's name was based on a joke first used by comedian Gilbert Gottfried at the 2008 Comedy Central Roast of Bob Saget, in which Gottfried jokingly implored listeners to disregard the (non-existent) rumor that Saget had raped and murdered a girl in 1990. Online posters began an Internet meme comparing Gottfried's joke with Beck's style of debate, by requesting Beck disprove he had committed the act in question. Eiland-Hall launched his website on September 1, 2009.

Beck filed a complaint to the WIPO under the Uniform Domain Name Dispute Resolution Policy (UDRP), arguing the domain name of the website was defamatory and asserted trademark infringement in its use of his name. Eiland-Hall filed a response brief to WIPO which cited the U.S. Supreme Court case Hustler Magazine v. Falwell, asserting the website's domain name was a form of free speech and satirical political humor.

Beck made a supplemental filing in the case arguing the domain name was misleading and might lead individuals to believe it contained factual information. Eiland-Hall filed a surreply and stated Beck had depreciated the value of the First Amendment by attempting to evade its reach in a legal proceeding outside U.S. courts. On October 29, 2009, WIPO ruled against Beck, concluding that Eiland-Hall was making a political statement through parody in a justified usage of the Glenn Beck mark.

Commentators noted Beck's actions led to a Streisand effect; his suit against the website drew increased attention to it. Representatives of Public Citizen, the Electronic Frontier Foundation and the Citizen Media Law Project were all of the opinion that Beck's trademark argument in his complaint against the website was ridiculous. The assistant director of the Citizen Media Law Project applauded WIPO's decision, saying, "It's good to see that this WIPO arbitrator had no interest in allowing Beck to circumvent the guarantees of the U.S. Constitution."

== History ==
=== Background ===
==== Gilbert Gottfried joke ====
Gilbert Gottfried was a featured comedian at the Comedy Central Roast of Bob Saget which first aired on August 16, 2008. At Saget's roast, Gottfried jokingly begged listeners to disregard the (nonexistent) rumor that his fellow comedian "raped and killed a girl in 1990". Gottfried repeatedly warned the audience at the roast not to spread the rumor, which did not exist before the comedian's speech. The audience in attendance at the Comedy Central Roast were both shocked and amused by the preposterous nature of Gottfried's joke which seemed more ludicrous each time he repeated it.

==== Internet meme ====
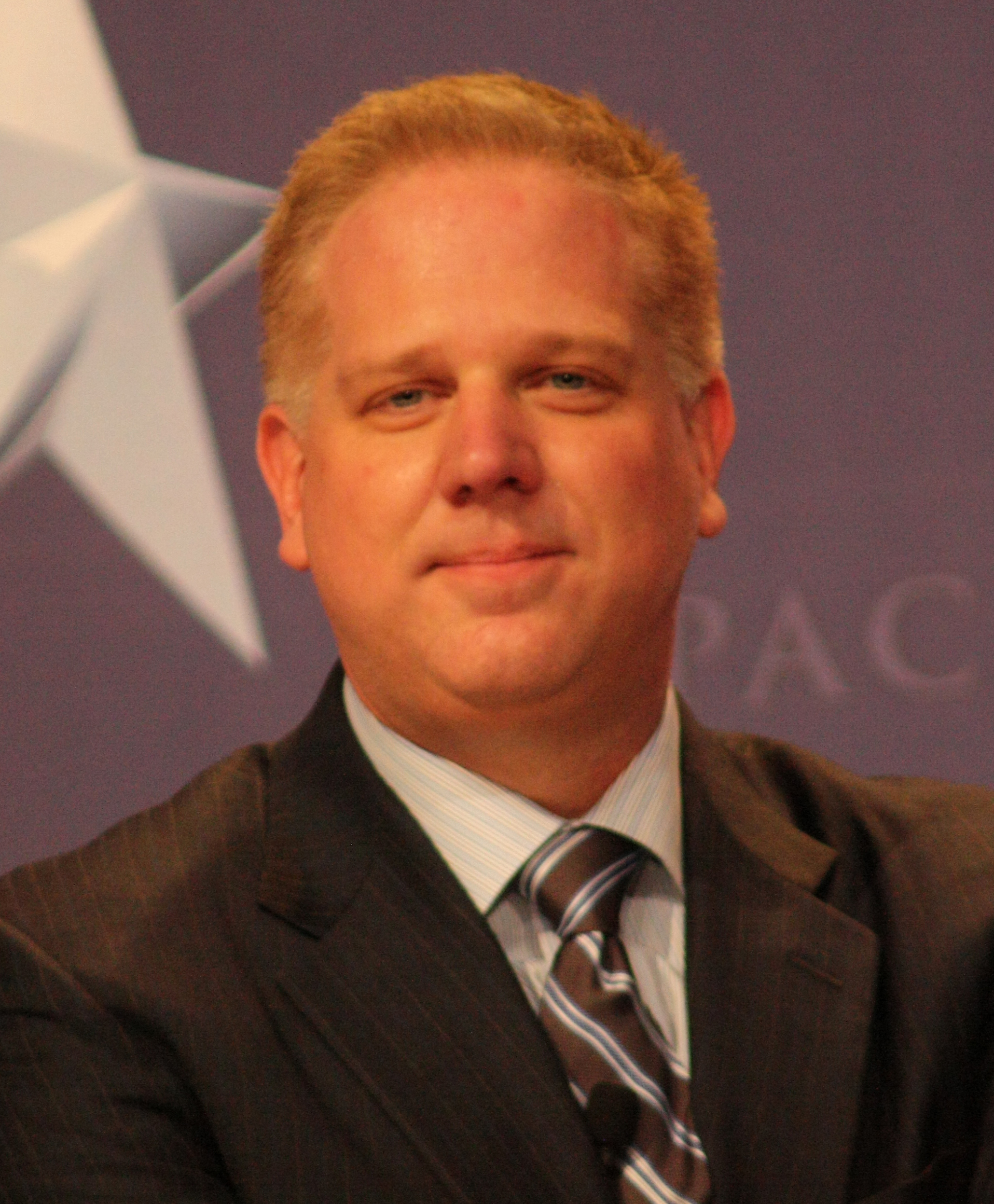
Glenn Beck in 2010

On August 31, 2009, a post on the Internet discussion community Fark applied Gottfried's joke to Glenn Beck. Online posters compared the Internet meme to Beck's style of arguing, requesting that Beck disprove that he had committed the act in question. The meme spread to social-media websites, including Encyclopedia Dramatica, Reddit, Yahoo!, Answers.com, YouTube, Twitter and Digg.com. A variation of the Googlebomb technique was used, in which Google provided "Glenn Beck murder" as a search suggestion in a query for "Glenn Beck".

Isaac Eiland-Hall, a 34-year-old computer science student in Panama City, Florida, saw the discussion on Fark using the Gottfried joke on Beck and created a website, GlennBeckRapedAndMurderedAYoungGirlIn1990.com, intending it as a parody of Beck's style of political commentary. He chose not to identify with the WHOIS service and decided to remain anonymous. Eiland-Hall used the domain name registrar Namecheap for his site. It was launched on September 1, 2009, and received over 120,000 page views during its first 24 hours. The website asserted that it did not believe the charges were true. Eiland-Hall wrote on the site that those furthering the meme were asserting that Beck used a similar strategy to promote his opinions and increase his viewership.

The webpage originally displayed a small text disclaimer at the bottom, stating that the site was satirical. Eiland-Hall later placed two prominent disclaimers at the top of the page, which identified it as parody. The disclaimer at the top of the website's main page stated its entire contents was parody, and included a link to a larger disclaimer at the bottom of the page. The site criticized Beck's tactic of challenging those he opposes to prove a negative. Eiland-Hall told Politics Daily that after reading the initial thread at Fark which started the meme, he came to the conclusion that for those involved online participation in its propagation was a form of catharsis. He explained in an interview with Ars Technica that it was a means of utilizing Beck's strategies to criticize him and a way to focus exasperation around Beck's style of commentary into action. Eiland-Hall's website inspired copycat parodies.

=== Litigation ===
==== Beck initiates legal action ====
By September 3, 2009, attorneys representing Mercury Radio Arts, Glenn Beck's media company, had requested that the domain registrar of Eiland-Hall's website delete the site. Beck's lawyers characterized the site's location as libelous. They demanded that the domain registrar revoke the WhoisGuard privacy-protection service for the website, and turn over contact information for the then-anonymous Eiland-Hall. The registrar, NameCheap, refused. On September 4, 2009, Beck's lawyers sent another letter to the domain registrar, repeating their requests and noting that they had read the website's contents and were therefore aware from statements posted to the site that its operator had been notified by the registrar.

Their second letter to NameCheap observed that the site was still operational on September 4, 2009, in spite of their prior requests on behalf of Beck. The domain registrar changed the name server of the website without telling Eiland-Hall; after contacting the registrar, he was permitted to return to his original name server. In an interview with Gawker on September 9, 2009, Eiland-Hall remarked that Beck's attorneys contacted the registrar of the domain, his hosting provider, as well as the company which housed the servers for his website. He noted that the hosting provider informed him they would not cooperate with the requests from Beck's lawyers unless they received a court order.

==== WIPO complaint ====
In September 2009, lawyers for Beck and Mercury Radio Arts filed a complaint with the World Intellectual Property Organization (WIPO) under the Uniform Domain-Name Dispute-Resolution Policy (UDRP) against the privacy service for Eiland-Hall's website. WIPO is a Switzerland-based agency of the United Nations. The rules of WIPO's Arbitration and Mediation Center were created by the Internet Corporation for Assigned Names and Numbers (ICANN). The privacy service for the website revealed the identity of the site's owner in response to Beck's complaint.

The complaint stated that Eiland-Hall was trying to distort perceptions about the purpose and derivation of the site. Beck argued that the domain name of the website could be confused with his trademark, "Glenn Beck". The complaint described the website's domain name as libelous claiming that it encroached upon Beck's legally registered claim of his name. Beck did not claim libel or defamation in the complaint, focusing on the legal issue of trademark. The complaint asserted that the website itself contained factually inaccurate information, was unauthorized and defamatory, and that it was highly probable it would create uncertainty among Beck's potential customers.

Beck's complaint asserted that the domain name of the website was an example of bad-faith registration. It argued that Eiland-Hall had no legitimate interest in, or right to, the website's domain name. As of September 2009 Beck was in the process of trademarking the use of his name for "goods and services", including the usage of "Glenn Beck" on merchandise.

==== Eiland-Hall response ====
Brief filed by respondent (September 28, 2009)

Eiland-Hall retained First Amendment rights lawyer Marc Randazza to represent him. According to Randazza, Eiland-Hall sought legal representation after he was contacted with legal requests from lawyers representing Beck. On September 28, 2009, Randazza filed a 17-page response brief on behalf of his client, asserting that the website's domain name was a form of protected political speech and satirical political humor. According to Randazza, the website was used for satirical purposes and its owner was not attempting to profit from it. Randazza wrote that an individual would have to be a pathetic idiot to come under the impression that his client's website was directly affiliated with Beck, contending that the website's domain name could not be confused with the "Glenn Beck" trademark except to "a moron in a hurry". (Note: "Moron in a hurry" refers to a legal concept where a reasonable person could become confused or deceived.)

Randazza asserted that Beck had insufficiently demonstrated trademark rights to his name, "Glenn Beck", and claimed that Beck was actually trying to have the website taken down because he did not appreciate the criticism through satire which parodied Beck's own techniques. He argued that Eiland-Hall had legitimate rights to his website's domain name because of its use to criticize Beck using political satire and as part of the Internet meme which had begun on the Fark website.

The brief gave a short history of Internet phenomena, including video parodies of the German film Downfall, memes based on the film 300, "Hitler Hates Kanye West", "All your base are belong to us", "Mr. Spock Ate My Balls", and the gerbil story involving Richard Gere.

Randazza traced the website's origin, explaining the internet meme's roots in Gilbert Gottfried's joke. He then spelled out the root comedic intent of Eiland-Hall's website, in an explanation he termed the humor equation:

$\begin{array}{c l} & \text{Outrageous Accusation} \\ + & \text{Celebrity} \\ + & \text{Question Why the Celebrity Does Not Deny the Accusation} \\ \hline = & \text{Confirmation of the Falsity of the Accusation} + \text{Laughter} \end{array}$

The Eiland-Hall response brief cited a clip of Beck interviewing United States Congressman Keith Ellison, a Muslim from Minnesota. Beck had stated to U.S. Representative Ellison, "No offense and I know Muslims, I like Muslims, I've been to mosques, I really don't think Islam is a religion of evil. I think it's being hijacked, quite frankly. With that being said, you are a Democrat. You are saying let's cut and run. And I have to tell you, I have been nervous about this interview because what I feel like saying is, sir, prove to me that you are not working with our enemies. And I know you’re not. I’m not accusing you of being an enemy. But that’s the way I feel, and I think a lot of Americans will feel that way." It was argued that this was an example of Beck's interview style in which he challenged his guests to prove a negative. Randazza concluded Beck's rhetorical style was similar to Gottfried's, simply devoid of comedic intent.

Randazza's argument compared the case to the Supreme Court of the United States case Hustler Magazine v. Falwell. Randazza wrote that Beck was attempting to evade the First Amendment to the United States Constitution by filing the legal process with an agency of the United Nations instead of in a U.S. court. In the legal brief, Randazza pointed out that Beck's action of going to the WIPO in an attempt to get the website taken down was in contradiction to his prior statements saying he preferred United States law over international law.

On September 29, 2009, Randazza requested that Beck voluntarily ask that the First Amendment be applied to the arbitration case, despite its international setting. Randazza made this request because Beck's political commentary favored the United States Constitution over international law. Randazza's September 29, 2009 letter to Beck's attorneys cited statements by Beck in which he indicated he preferred United States law over international law. Beck had said, "Once we sign our rights over to international law, the Constitution is officially dead." Randazza's letter concluded: "I am certain that neither party wishes to see First Amendment rights subordinated to international trademark principles, thus unwittingly proving Mr. Beck's point. Lest this case become an example of international law causing damage to the constitutional rights that both of our clients hold dear, I respectfully request that your client agree to stipulate to the application of American constitutional law to this case."

Audio interview of Marc Randazza on WPRR radio program Declaring Independence (October 8, 2009)

On October 8, 2009, Randazza was interviewed about the case on the WPRR radio program, Declaring Independence. He explained why Beck did not file a libel lawsuit in the United States. He pointed out that because Beck was a public figure he had to prove a legal standard referred to as actual malice, and show that Eiland-Hall knew his assertions were inaccurate. He explained that this did not apply to Eiland-Hall's website even if it was knowingly inaccurate, because the U.S. Supreme Court ruled in Hustler Magazine v. Falwell that no proof is needed for an absurd statement made in the context of satire.

==== Supplemental filing and surreply ====
Beck submitted a supplemental filing in the case on October 13, 2009. In the supplemental filing, his attorneys argued that the joke of the Eiland-Hall website was not obvious; therefore, the website's domain name was misleading. The filing asserted: "While there is absolutely nothing humorous or amusing about the statement made by Respondent in his domain name that 'Glenn Beck Raped and Murdered a Young Girl in 1990,' the average Internet user finding the domain name GlennBeckRapedAndMurderedAYoungGirlin1990.com ("Disputed Domain Name") in a search would have no reason not to believe that they will be directed to a website providing factual information (as opposed to protected criticism or similar protected speech) about Mr. Beck."

On October 20, 2009, Eiland-Hall filed a surreply in response to Beck's supplemental filing. Eiland-Hall asserted in the surreply that Beck was the butt of a viral joke which was protected speech even if it was not perceived as comedic in nature by the subject. He stated Beck had depreciated the value of the First Amendment by attempting to evade its reach in a legal proceeding outside U.S. courts.

==== WIPO ruling ====
On October 29, 2009, the WIPO ruled against Glenn Beck in the case. For Beck to have prevailed in the case, the WIPO court would have had to have ruled in Beck's favor on three issues: that the domain name could be mistaken for the mark "Glenn Beck"; that Eiland-Hall did not have a justifiable stake in the name, and that the domain name was "bad faith". On the first point, WIPO arbitrator Frederick M. Abbott ruled that the domain name could be confused with the "Glenn Beck" mark. On the issue of profit from Beck's mark WIPO ruled that there had not been substantial commercial activity to warrant this particular claim. Abbott was the sole arbitrator on the WIPO panel.

Abbott concluded that Eiland-Hall had legitimate interests in the website's name for purposes of political satire in the form of comedic parody. Abbott did not draw a conclusion on the third point, noting that it was unlikely that Beck would have prevailed on the "bad faith" issue. Abbott wrote that the determination of whether the website is defamatory would not be an issue for WIPO. Instead, the WIPO limited the case's scope to a determination of whether the website registrant had engaged in "abusive domain name registration and use".

=== Eiland-Hall gives domain to Beck ===
On November 6, 2009, Eiland-Hall wrote to Beck, giving him control of the domain free of charge, and providing Beck with its username and password. Eiland-Hall wrote that he had made his point, and the act of filing the complaint exacerbated the situation for the complainant. Eiland-Hall explained his rationale for giving away the domain name, citing his desire to protect the applicability of the First Amendment to the U.S. Constitution had been satisfied.

Techdirt reported on November 6, 2009, that GlennBeckRapedAndMurderedAYoungGirlIn1990.com was a dead site; by November 10 the domain name was registered to Beck's company, Mercury Radio Arts. In a notice posted to one of his other websites, Eiland-Hall wished Beck (then suffering from appendicitis) well, and characterized the conclusion of the case as a success. In a post on his blog, Eiland-Hall's lawyer Marc Randazza described the case as a victory for freedom of speech.

Beck did not respond to Eiland-Hall's letter, and Beck's representative declined comment to PC Magazine about the conclusion of the case. Lawyers for Beck did not respond to a request for comment about the WIPO ruling from National Public Radio.

== Commentary ==
=== Complaint and response ===
Electronic Frontier Foundation attorney Corynne McSherry and Paul Levy of Public Citizen commented on the case to Ars Technica, calling Beck's trademark claim before the WIPO ridiculous. The Citizen Media Law Project agreed with this assessment. Levy noted that domain names, in and of themselves, could be seen as defamatory; however, the statement in the domain name would have to be deemed both false and malicious. Levy and McSherry thought that the filing may have been to ascertain Eiland-Hall's identity, which was anonymous prior to the complaint. McSherry couldn't recall a prior case where an individual asserted a domain name was libelous. Jack Bremer of The First Post wrote that the attempt by Beck's lawyers arguing the domain name of the website was itself defamatory had likely never occurred before in the field of information technology law.

Media commentators, including Paul Schmelzer of the Minnesota Independent, Andy Carvin of National Public Radio, and Andrew Allemann of Domain Name Wire, considered Randazza's legal brief entertainingly written. Writing for Bostonist, Rick Sawyer called Randazza's legal brief very funny and considered him among the uproariously amusing wordsmiths in North Shore, Massachusetts. Eriq Gardner of Adweek noted that the case had strategic import for the field of politics, referring to Beck's style of commentary as exemplified in the interview with Congressman Keith Ellison. Chris Matyszczyk of CNET News commented on the legal issues of the case; he asked whether it should hold to U.S. law as it involved two citizens, and additionally wondered if Beck was asserting trademark over his full name or his individual first and last names as well. Ed Brayton of ScienceBlogs called Randazza's request that Beck stipulate to United States law intellectually creative. Daily Kos pointed out the inherent hypocrisy in Beck's legal position of seeking redress in an international agency when compared to his prior statements criticizing foreign law in favor of U.S. law.

=== Streisand effect ===
Commentators analyzed Beck's actions with respect to the "Streisand effect". (Note: "Streisand effect" is a phenomenon in which an attempt to remove material from the Internet backfires, increasing interest in the material.) Jim Emerson of the Chicago Sun-Times commented that the website's disclaimer was not enough to dissuade attorneys representing Beck from attempting to have the site removed, which triggered the Streisand effect and backfired against their client. Jeffrey Weiss of Politics Daily wrote that by taking legal action, Beck achieved the one impact he did not desire, namely garnering more attention for Eiland-Hall's website. John Cook of Gawker noted Beck's attempts to remove the site from the Internet helped assure it would become noteworthy because of his actions.

Mike Masnick wrote about the case on Techdirt, commenting on the effect of Beck's actions on the meme's spread. He observed in retrospect it would have been advantageous for Beck to have simply done nothing rather than encourage the meme as a byproduct of his attempts to remove it from the Internet. Masnick pointed out that Beck's actions provided legitimacy to the meme's noteworthiness. Steffen Schmidt wrote of Beck's predicament in a Des Moines Register article: "Mr. Beck has quite a task ahead of him. Shutting down one web site is like trying to eradicate Pueraria lobata the dreaded Kudzu vine that is eating the South." Citizen Media Law Project observed Beck had exacerbated the situation by intimating legal tactics against Eiland-Hall, which served to increase the popularity of the meme and coverage of it among blogs.

== Impact ==
At the conclusion of the WIPO case Glynnis MacNicol of Mediaite commented that those afforded freedom of speech guaranteed by the First Amendment — including Glenn Beck — must allow for an Internet environment with the same rights given to everyone. Brayton of ScienceBlogs pointed out that Beck and his lawyers never replied to Randazza's request for all parties to stipulate to the U.S. Constitution and the First Amendment in the case. Brayton observed that this was irrelevant as Beck's case was weak even when examined under the standards of the UN agency. Of Eiland-Hall's decision to turn the domain over to Beck after the conclusion of the case he commented that this was a wise strategic move. Monica Hesse of The Washington Post remarked upon the conclusion of the case that the division between what is considered libel and satire was murky, and asked whether this determination was more difficult to make on the Internet where speech can be amplified by others.

Wendy Davis of Online Media Daily commented on the potential impact of the case, and observed it was a victory for proponents of Internet rights. Davis pointed out a judgment for Beck would have enabled additional WIPO cases from individuals who were the focus of satire on the web, as a way for those people to avoid judgment in U.S. courts which adhere to First Amendment case law. John Cook of Gawker called Eiland-Hall's decision to turn the domain name over to Beck an optimal end to the affair which emphasized the ridiculousness of Beck's actions. Citizen Media Law Project assistant director Sam Bayard applauded WIPO's decision, noting, "It's good to see that this WIPO arbitrator had no interest in allowing Beck to circumvent the guarantees of the U.S. Constitution."

The Washington Post columnist Dana Milbank wrote in his 2010 book Tears of a Clown, that Beck had been baited by Eiland-Hall to confirm the importance of the United Nations. Alexander Zaitchik came to a similar conclusion in his 2010 book Common Nonsense, and pointed out the discrepancy between Beck's criticism of the United Nations as part of a New World Order with Beck's subsequent reliance upon the WIPO where he chose to file the case. The case was cited by Jude A. Thomas in a 2011 article published in the John Marshall Review of Intellectual Property Law. In a discussion of the conflicts between freedom of speech and trademark, Thomas noted that panels of the UDRP have concluded website operators had fair use over domain names even in cases where the name in question was exactly the same as that trademarked by the individual filing the complaint to the WIPO.

== See also ==
- Comedy Central Roast of Bob Saget
- "Dances with Smurfs"
- Glenn Beck Program
- List of Internet phenomena
- List of satirists and satires
- News satire
- "Politically Inept, with Homer Simpson"
