= Tropic (magazine) =

- Final Editor: Tom Shroder
- Categories: Sunday magazine
- Frequency: Weekly
- First issue: October 15, 1967
- Final issue: December 6, 1998
- Company: Miami Herald, Knight Ridder
- Country: United States
- Based in: Miami, Florida, U.S.
- Language: English

A 1992 issue of Tropic Magazine

Tropic was the Miami Herald's Sunday magazine, published as an insert in the Sunday edition from 1967 until 1998. Tropic won three Pulitzer Prizes and published many writers who went on to become well known. More notable writers included humor columnists Dave Barry, Gene Weingarten, Carl Hiaasen, and Madeleine Blais. Other writers included Paul Levine, Joel Achenbach, Tom Shroder, and others.

The magazine created the Tropic Hunt, now known as the Herald Hunt.

== See also ==
- Sunday magazines
- Miami Herald
