= Judge Foster =

Judge Foster may refer to:

- Alfred Foster (judge) (1886–1962), judge of the County Court of Victoria, Australia
- Alison Foster (born 1957), British barrister judge of the High Court of England and Wales
- Cassius Gaius Foster (1837–1899), judge of the United States District Court for the District of Kansas
- Dwight Foster (politician, born 1828) (died 1884), Massachusetts probate judge
- Harry Hylton-Foster (1905–1965), Royal Air Force military judge in North Africa
- Joel Foster (1814–1885), county judge of St. Croix County, Wisconsin
- Michael Foster (English judge) (1689–1763), English puisne judge of the King's Bench
- Peter Foster (judge) (1912–1985), English High Court judge
- Rufus Edward Foster (1871–1942), judge of the United States Court of Appeals for the Fifth Circuit

== See also ==
- Justice Foster (disambiguation)
