= A moron in a hurry =

Legal phrase used in trademark cases

"A moron in a hurry" is a phrase that has been used in legal cases, especially in the UK, involving trademark infringement and passing off. Where one party alleges that another (the defendant) has infringed their intellectual property rights by offering for sale a product that is confusably similar to their own, the court has to decide whether a reasonable person would be misled by the defendant's trademark or the get-up of their product. It has been held that "if only a moron in a hurry would be misled" the case is not made out. Although this formulation addresses only fairly extreme instances of confusability, and says nothing about less clear examples, the phrase is sometimes referred to as a "test".

== United Kingdom ==
=== Origin ===
The phrase was first used by Peter Foster in the 1978 English High Court case Morning Star Cooperative Society v Express Newspapers Limited, in which the publishers of the Morning Star, a British Communist Party publication, sought an injunction to prevent Express Newspapers from launching a new tabloid to be called the Daily Star. The judge ruled against the Morning Star, noting that, "If one puts the two papers side by side I for myself would find that the two papers are so different in every way that only a moron in a hurry would be misled."

=== Later examples ===
The phrase was quoted in the same context in Newsweek Inc. v British Broadcasting Corp. by Lord Denning.

In 2006, the phrase was used in legal argument in the case of Apple Corps v Apple Computer, between Apple Corps (the record label started by the Beatles in 1968) and Apple Computer Inc. (makers of Macintosh computers). Apple Computer argued that "[e]ven a moron in a hurry could not be mistaken about" the difference between iTunes and the Apple Corps record label. Apple Corps' logo was a green Granny Smith apple, whereas Apple Computer's logo was a "cartoonish apple with a neat bite out of its side". Judgment was given in favour of Apple Computer Inc.

== Canada ==
In Canada, the phrase was considered in C.M.S. Industries Ltd. v. UAP Inc., where the court held that UAP had infringed the plaintiff's trademark. Four years later, in Mattel, Inc. v. 3894207 Canada Inc., the Supreme Court of Canada moved away from the "moron" analysis, adopting in its place consideration of an "ordinary hurried purchaser", a standard between that of a "moron" and a "careful and diligent purchaser". Mattel is now the standard in Canada.

== Pakistan ==
In 2017, the Sindh High Court used the "moron in a hurry" test as one of several approaches to compare competing syrup drink products. The plaintiff, owner of the well known ROOH AFZA trademark, sued a company who had started selling a very similar product under the mark ROOH-E-SAMAR. The court held that the respective marks were similar, and that a less than prudent customer would undoubtedly be deceived given the minute differences between the colour of the band and the placement of fruits on the respective wrappers.

== United States ==
Attorney Marc J. Randazza used the phrase as part of his defence in Beck v. Eiland-Hall for his client's use of Glenn Beck's name in a parody website.

== See also ==
- Man on the Clapham omnibus
- Reasonable person ("Reasonable man")
- Passing off
