= The Miami Hurricane =

Student newspaper at University of Miami

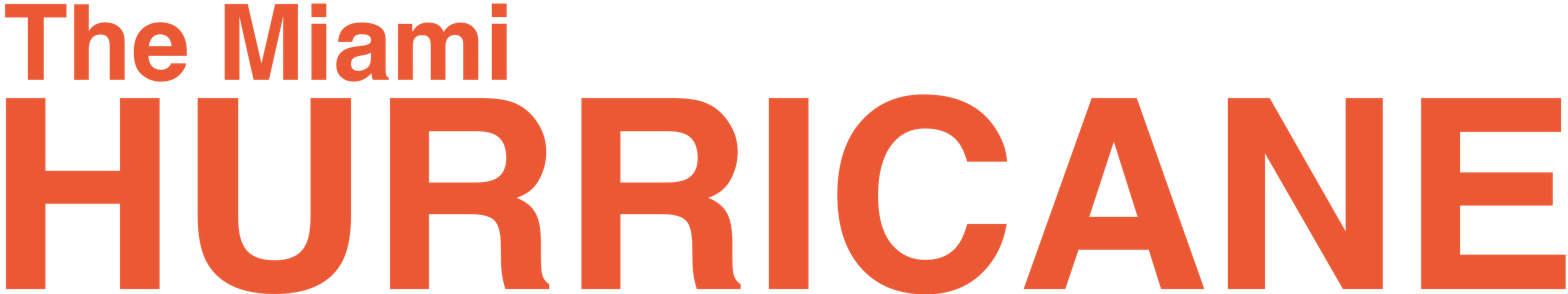
- Type: Student newspaper
- Format: Compact
- Owner: University of Miami
- General manager: Austin Furgatch
- Founded: 1929
- Language: English
- Headquarters: Student Activities Center; Student Media Suite 200; 1330 Miller Drive; Coral Gables, Florida 33146
- Circulation: 8,000
- Website: themiamihurricane.com

The Miami Hurricane is the official student newspaper at the University of Miami in Coral Gables, Florida.

Founded in 1929, The Miami Hurricane is published each Tuesday with timely online updates daily by a staff of mostly undergraduate University of Miami students. The newspaper has won multiple awards during its history, including two Associated Collegiate Press National Pacemaker Awards in 1992 and 2009. It has been designated an Associated Collegiate Press "Hall of Fame" newspaper.

The Miami Hurricane has a weekly print distribution of 8,000, consisting predominantly of University of Miami students, staff, administrators, faculty, and employees. It is funded through local advertising and university subsidies. Its cumulative circulation including online readers is 30,000.

It is distributed free of charge on the University of Miami campus and at several nearby off-campus locations each Tuesday. The newspaper provides updates on its online news site and issues an email newsletter twice weekly on Tuesdays and Thursdays.

The Miami Hurricane is an also an affiliate of UWIRE, which distributes and promotes its content to their global network.

== Founding ==
The University of Miami's first campus publication, The University News, was founded in October 1927 but ceased publication the end of that year after confronting financial challenges. With support from many of its original staff members, The Miami Hurricane was launched two years later, in 1929.

== Notable alumni ==
- Judy Battista, sports writer, NFL.com
- G. Holmes Braddock, former school district member, Miami-Dade County Public Schools
- Scott Braun, studio host and reporter, MLB Network and NHL Network
- Jason Haikara, executive vice president, MediaLink
- Michelle Kaufman, sports writer for Miami Herald
- Dan Le Batard, former radio host and columnist, ESPN Radio and Miami Herald
- Darwin Porter, travel journalist and celebrity biographer
- Ralph Renick, television journalist, WTVJ, president of Radio Television Digital News Association, and board member of Associated Press
- Eliott Rodriguez, news anchor, WFOR-TV
