= Big Trouble (novel) =

1999 novel by Dave Barry

- First edition
- Author: Dave Barry
- Language: English
- Genre: Humor
- Publisher: Putnam
- Publication date: September 1999
- Publication place: United States
- ISBN: 978-0-399-14567-4
- OCLC: 41017558
- Dewey Decimal: 813/.54 21
- LC Class: PS3552.A74146 B54 1999
- Followed by: Tricky Business

Big Trouble is Dave Barry's first novel. Barry, a longtime columnist for The Miami Herald, set the novel's events in and around Miami, Florida.

== Plot ==
Eliot Arnold is a divorced, recently-fired newspaper reporter trying to start his own advertising and public relations agency. His teenaged son, Matt's nighttime attempt to "kill" his high-school classmate, Jenny, unfortunately coincides with a real assassination attempt on her alcoholic, abusive stepfather, Arthur Herk, by two freelance hit men from New Jersey. In the ensuing confusion, Eliot meets Arthur's wife, Jenny's mother Anna, and the two are instantly taken with each other. When Arthur, spooked by the gunfire, runs to the room of the Herks' Latin maid, Nina, she panics and runs outside the house, where she is befriended by Puggy, a young homeless man living in a tree on the property.

Interviewed by Miami Police officers Monica and Walter, Arthur denies having any enemies, while secretly knowing that his employer, a corrupt contracting firm, has caught him embezzling money to pay off his gambling debts. Arthur decides to turn state's evidence, and, in order to ensure he is taken seriously by the police, intends to buy a missile from a pair of Russian arms dealers and turn it over to the police, claiming it belongs to his employer. But when Arthur goes to the dive bar the arms dealers are using as a front, he, the Russians, and Puggy (who earns a small wage helping to fetch and carry the crates containing the dealers' merchandise) are held up by Snake and Eddie, two dimwit grifters previously ejected from the bar. Mistaking Arthur for a "kingpin", Snake concludes that whatever is in the suitcase Arthur was buying must be valuable, and grabs it (ignoring the briefcase containing $10,000 in cash that Arthur brought with him).

Jenny arranges to let Matt "kill" her in accordance with the rules of the game, at the back of a nearby mall, but they are spotted by Jack Pendick, a wannabe-policeman who mistakes Matt's squirt gun for a real firearm and starts shooting his own gun at Matt. They flee to Jenny's house and call Eliot, who arrives just before Snake and Eddie enter the house, holding Arthur at gunpoint. The whole family is taken captive, along with Officers Monica and Walter, who arrive to investigate the shooting at the mall.

After interrogating the Russians, FBI Agents Greer and Seitz intercept Miami Detective Baker, and tell him the suitcase contains a miniature nuclear bomb, which, unlike a conventional "nuke", has no failsafes and is intentionally designed to be easy to trigger.

Snake and Eddie leave for Miami International Airport with the bomb, and Jenny and Puggy as hostages. Officer Monica manages to free herself, Eliot and Anna, and they rush to the airport, leaving Walter and Arthur handcuffed together. Walter's attempts to free himself are hampered by Arthur, who falls face-first onto a large cane toad camped in his dog's food dish, receiving a dose of bufotenin venom that causes him to hallucinate.

Four different groups of people reach the airport:

- Snake, Eddie, Puggy, and Jenny board a plane for the Bahamas, but Puggy escapes before the plane takes off; a security officer opens the suitcase and does not recognize the bomb for what it is, but insists that Snake turn it on to show that it is harmless; Snake flips a series of switches, starting the bomb's forty-five-minute timer;
- Eliot, Anna, Matt, Nina and Monica find Puggy, who leads them to the airplane; Monica and Matt board the plane before it takes off, but Eliot and Anna are left behind;
- Henry and Leonard, the two hitmen, are trying to return home to New Jersey, but are interrupted by an escaped pet python that nearly suffocates Leonard, before Henry shoots it; the chaos caused by the python prevents any security officers from being able to stop the plane taking off, despite Eliot and Anna's frantic pleas;
- Detective Baker and Agents Greer and Seitz arrive and, learning that the bomb's timer has been started, order the plane shot down by fighter jets from Homestead Air Reserve Base, to prevent more innocent lives being lost.

When Monica confronts Snake, he shoots her with his gun, though not fatally. Eddie, unnerved by Snake's increasingly erratic and violent behavior, objects, and Snake shoots Eddie in the leg as punishment for perceived "insubordination." Eddie retaliates by pushing the suitcase out the plane's door and into the ocean. Snake, unwilling to lose his "kingpin suitcase," grabs it and is pulled out of the plane along with it. With Snake and the suitcase gone, the pilot radios the airport, and the fighter jets are called off. The bomb explodes underwater, killing no one except Snake and a large number of deep water fish. In the aftermath, the explosion is passed off as a rogue seismic event, and the main news item in the next day's paper is the bevy of goats that escaped on the highway and delayed the protagonists' rush to the airport.

In the epilogue:

- Anna divorces Arthur and marries Eliot; Matt and Jenny date for a while, but since they are step-siblings, ultimately choose to remain friends;
- After recovering from the toad venom, Arthur tries to inform on his employer, but no evidence is found, and Arthur is killed in a supposed "fishing accident" a few weeks later;
- Detective Baker marries Officer Monica, and tells her the truth about the bomb, though he swears her to secrecy;
- Officer Walter quits the police force and becomes a male stripper;
- Jack Pendick serves a short prison sentence and is hired as a security guard;
- Henry is acquitted of any criminal acts at the airport, and he and Leonard return to New Jersey and continue to operate as hit men, though they steadfastly refuse to accept any future contracts in South Florida;
- Puggy and Nina continue living in the Herks' home, sometimes spending nights in Puggy's tree.

== Literary development and influences ==
Big Trouble is Barry's first full-length novel, after several years as a columnist for the Miami Herald, and after publishing several humorous non-fiction books. In his dedication, Barry credited his editor at Putnam Publishing, Neil Nyren, with proposing that Barry write a novel, "and made it sound like a lot of fun... I forgive him for the fact that he never told me, back at the beginning, that I would need to come up with characters and a plot." In the same dedication, Barry also thanked numerous novelists of his acquaintance, which included Carl Hiaasen ("who is the master of the genre I tried to write in – the Bunch of South Florida Wackos genre"), Stephen King, Elmore Leonard, Paul Levine, Ridley Pearson, and Les Standiford.

The novel is not, in fact, Barry's first work of fiction, as he contributed the opening chapter for the collaborative novel Naked Came the Manatee, which was published earlier (in 1996) and featured chapters by Hiaasen, Leonard, Levine, and Standiford.

Barry and Ridley Pearson later collaborated on a series of children's novels, beginning with Peter and the Starcatchers, published in 2004.

== Reception ==
Kirkus Reviews gave a positive review for the novel, comparing Barry's style to Laurence Shames and writing "The big surprise is how readily adaptable Barry’s jokey rhythms are to the demands of creating characters and spinning them a farcical plot. But a host of lesser surprises are equally welcome." Publishers Weekly gave a starred review, calling Barry "indisputably one of the funniest humorists writing today" and praising the narrative, although it criticized the "occasional stiffness and tendency to strain for one-liners".

== Adaptation ==
Big Trouble was made into a film, starring Tim Allen and Rene Russo as Eliot and Anna respectively, and produced and directed by Barry Sonnenfeld. The film was scheduled for release in September 2001. However, the film's release was delayed until 2002 because of the final scenes' unfortunate resemblance to the Al-Qaeda terrorist attacks on September 11, 2001.
