= Boogers Are My Beat =

Book by Dave Barry

- Author: Dave Barry
- Publisher: Crown Publishing Group
- Publication date: September 23, 2003
- ISBN: 1-4000-4757-9

Boogers Are My Beat: More Lies, but Some Actual Journalism is a 2003 humorous essay collection by American author and columnist Dave Barry.

Collecting columns written by Barry spanning the years 1999–2002. Subjects are broad-ranging, including popular culture (such the Oscars and Penélope Cruz), politics (such as the 2000 United States presidential election, including recounting the Florida votes and the national conventions), and sports (such as the 2002 Winter Olympics). Also included are two feature, non-humor columns regarding the September 11 attacks. The first describes his emotions of despair and anger in the days following the disaster, with the second acting as a follow-up to the fate of United Flight 93 almost a full year following the events.
