= I'll Mature When I'm Dead =

- Author: Dave Barry
- Publisher: G. P. Putnam's Sons
- Publication date: 2010

I'll Mature When I'm Dead: Dave Barry's Amazing Tales of Adulthood is a 2010 humor book by Dave Barry. In the book, Barry talks about parenthood, being a celebrity, technology, his screenplay career, a Twilight spoof, and a 24 script. The book was published in 2010. He also mentions in each essay about a random thing.

== Topics of stories and essays ==
- "Solving The Celebrity Problem": He mentions the Kardashians and how only Caitlyn Jenner (referenced as Bruce Jenner) (Note: Jenner changed her name due to gender transition in 2015.) has done the work.
- "Technology": He mentions that even if you use a magnifying glass an inch away from the TV, you can't see ones & zeros in Jack Bauer's nose when it's the size of the Lincoln Tunnel.
- "Parenthood": Dads don't gator.
- "The Big Dumpster": Barry mentions that he wrote two ideas; one with superhuman chickens, and one with political themes, including the President doing the Hokey Pokey, titled Chickens!, and Head of State.
- "Fangs of Endearment": He has vampires, werewolves, and Zamboni machines.
