= Rock Bottom Remainders =

American charity rock band

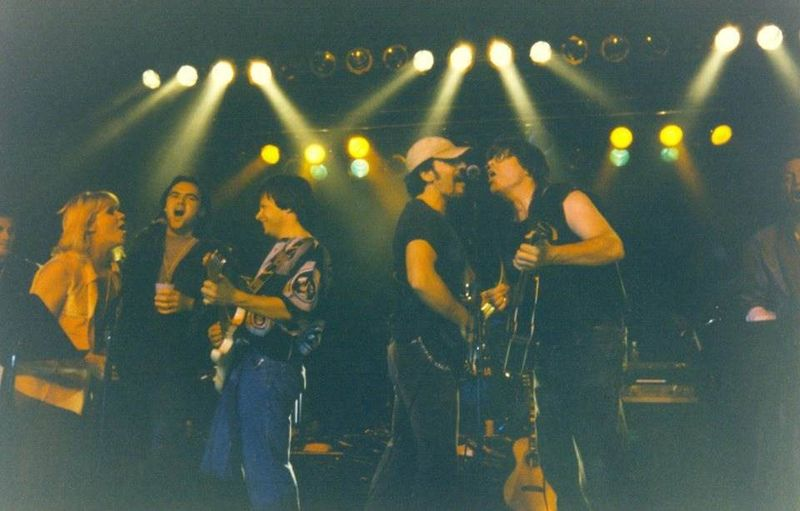
- The Rock Bottom Remainders, with Bruce Springsteen, performing at the American Booksellers Association convention in Anaheim, California, 1992.

Background information
- Origin: Anaheim, California, United States
- Genre: Rock music
- Years active: 1992–2012; 2015
- Website: rockbottomremainders.com

The Rock Bottom Remainders, also known as the Remainders, are an American rock charity supergroup consisting of popular published writers, most of them also amateur musicians. The band took its self-mocking name from the publishing term "remaindered book", a term for books that are no longer selling well and whose remaining unsold copies are liquidated by the publisher at greatly reduced prices. Their concerts have raised over $3 million for charity, particularly for literary and First Amendment-related causes.

Band members included Dave Barry, Stephen King, Amy Tan, Sam Barry, Ridley Pearson, Scott Turow, Joel Selvin, James McBride, Mitch Albom, Roy Blount Jr., Barbara Kingsolver, Robert Fulghum, Matt Groening, Tad Bartimus, Greg Iles, Aron Ralston and honorary member Maya Angelou among others, as well as professional musicians such as multi-instrumentalist (and author) Al Kooper, drummer Josh Kelly, guitarist Roger McGuinn and saxophonist Erasmo Paulo. Founder Kathi Kamen Goldmark died on May 24, 2012, and the group disbanded a month later, following a memorial concert in her honor.

== History ==
The Remainders was founded in 1992 by Kathi Kamen Goldmark a musician whose day job was in book publicity. She met many authors through her work, and one day while driving one of the authors around, she hit upon the idea of starting a band with them. The Remainders first performed in May 1992 at the American Booksellers Association convention in Anaheim, California. A review of the concert in The Washington Post called it as "the most heavily promoted musical debut since The Monkees."

In his memoir On Writing, Stephen King described the Remainders' performances as energetic, if sloppy, due to the limited musical skills of himself and some other writers, and perhaps reminiscent of a bar band when augmented by a few professional musicians. King wrote that "with a couple of 'ringer' musicians on sax and drums (plus, in the early days, our musical guru, Al Kooper, at the heart of the group), we sounded pretty good. You’d pay to hear us. Not a lot, not U2 or E Street Band prices, but maybe what the oldtimers call 'roadhouse money'." Dave Barry later joked, "We played music by what I call the Rumor Method, where in from time to time an alarming rumor went around the band: There might have been a chord change. This prompted everybody to change to a new chord. Although not necessarily the same new chord."

In 1995, the Remainders played at the opening of the Rock and Roll Hall of Fame in Cleveland, Ohio.

Several RBR members are featured on the 1998 double album Stranger than Fiction ("Don't Quit Your Day Job" Records), along with other noted authors' comic attempts at song.

In April 2010, they launched the Wordstock Tour presented by the Pearson Foundation and We Give Books, benefiting the children and schools of Haiti.

The Remainders gave their last concert on June 23, 2012, at the annual conference of the American Library Association in Anaheim, where they played their first concert 20 years before. The event, co-sponsored by ProQuest, raised money for library and information science scholarships.

The Remainders' last performance was taped within days of the concert and then aired on the August 6, 2012, episode of The Late Late Show with Craig Ferguson, on which Stephen King and Dave Barry were guests.

In September 2014, it was announced that the Remainders would reunite to perform at the Tucson Festival of Books in March 2015. On March 15, 2015, Merl Reagle's syndicated Sunday crossword puzzle alluded to the reunion. Titled "Book Notes," the crossword included the band's name and several puns using names of band members.

== Concerts ==
- 1992, Anaheim: American Booksellers Association convention
- 1993, six East Coast cities: the 'Three Chords and an Attitude' tour
- 1995, Cleveland: the Rock and Roll Hall of Fame opening
- 1997: Miami: A version of the band with Barry, Albom, Ridley Pearson, and Warren Zevon played at the Miami Book Fair
- 2002, Miami: outside American Airlines Arena before Bruce Springsteen & the E Street Band‘s concert during The Rising tour
- April 23, 2010, New York City: at the Nokia Theater in Times Square
- 2012, Anaheim: American Library Association convention

== Books ==
- Mid-Life Confidential: The Rock Bottom Remainders Tour America with Three Chords and an Attitude (1994), by Dave Barry, Tad Bartimus, Roy Blount Jr., Michael Dorris, Robert Fulghum, Kathi Goldmark, Matt Groening, Stephen King, Barbara Kingsolver, Al Kooper, Greil Marcus, Dave Marsh, Ridley Pearson, Joel Selvin, and Amy Tan; photographs by Tabitha King.
- Hard Listening: The Greatest Rock Band Ever (Of Authors) Tells All (2013), by Mitch Albom, Dave Barry, Sam Barry, Roy Blount Jr., Matt Groening, Greg Iles, Stephen King, James McBride, Roger McGuinn, Ridley Pearson, Amy Tan, and Scott Turow. An interactive ebook that combines essays, fiction, musings, candid email exchanges and conversations, compromising photographs, audio and video clips, and interactive quizzes that gives a view into the private lives of the authors.

== See also ==
- Band from TV, a similar group featuring television actors
- Cats Laughing, a writer-heavy band
