= G. Holmes Braddock =

American politician (1925–2025)

- Braddock, c. 1990

Chair of the Miami-Dade County Public School Board
- In office June 21, 1972 – November 20, 1975
- Preceded by: William Lehman
- Succeeded by: Ben Sheppard
- In office January 7, 1969 – January 5, 1971
- Preceded by: C. T. McCrimmon
- Succeeded by: William Lehman

Member of the Miami-Dade County Public School Board
- In office January 8, 1963 – November 20, 2000
- Preceded by: Eunice P. Anderson
- Succeeded by: Jacqueline Pepper

Personal details
- Born: Grover Holmes Braddock; July 23, 1925 Forsyth, Georgia, U.S.
- Died: July 24, 2025 (aged 100) Miami, Florida, U.S.
- Party: Democratic
- Spouses: Ruth Braddock (m. 1946; div. 1982); Virginia Braddock (m. 1986)
- Children: 4
- Education: University of Miami (BA, MA)

Grover Holmes Braddock (July 23, 1925 – July 24, 2025) was an American politician who served on the Miami-Dade County Public School Board from 1962 until 2000. As the school board's chairman in 1969 and 1970, he was instrumental in the desegregation of the county school system, particularly through his advocacy for busing.

== Early life and education ==
Grover Holmes Braddock was born on July 23, 1925, in Forsyth, Georgia. Throughout his life, he went by his middle name Holmes. When Braddock was 6, he and his family moved to Sebastian, Florida, at that time a rural town. Braddock was raised as a traditional Southerner and held conservative views on race and segregation in his youth, though his views began to liberalize at the age of 20. His mother, a schoolteacher, was a staunch segregationist. Braddock was bused 16 miles to an all-white school, passing an all-black school along the way. He graduated from Vero Beach High School in 1942. During World War II, Braddock served for two years as a medic aboard a hospital ship. His father – who suffered from polio – also served in the war as a merchant mariner; he died during the war when he was swept overboard.

In 1946, Braddock enrolled at the University of Miami. He was a member of the Iron Arrow Honor Society and was the sports editor for the student newspaper The Miami Hurricane. Braddock was an avid and recognized fan of Miami Hurricanes football, missing just 12 home games between 1946 and 2015. He graduated with a bachelor's degree in journalism in 1949. Braddock continued his education at the university using the G.I. Bill, graduating with a master's degree in human relations in 1953. During this period, he was also the manager of the students' union and a recruiter for the university. After graduating, Braddock was the manager of the Miami Shores Country Club. He later became a licensed insurance agent, specializing in life, health, and pension insurance.

== Political career ==
A member of the Democratic Party, Braddock was elected to the Miami-Dade County Public School Board in 1962. Throughout his tenure, he was an advocate for bilingual education, collective bargaining for teachers, school voucher programs, and corporal punishment. He refused numerous offers to run for the state legislature, arguing he had more influence as a member of the school board.

Braddock served one term as the chairman of the school board from 1969 to 1970. In this role, he was instrumental in desegregating the county school system. At the time, Dade County had the sixth largest school district in the country, with over 250,000 students and 10,000 teachers. Bucking his reputation as a traditional Southerner whose previous political campaigns had been largely opposed to by the Black community due to his conservative views on race, Braddock gave a speech at a League of Women Voters event in January 1970 in which he argued in favor of desegregation busing. Braddock noted it was hypocritical that busing was popular among whites when it would "maintain segregation" by busing white students past all-black schools but unpopular it when it would diversify schools. He also argued that desegregation busing was the only way to ensure that every student would receive a quality education.

For his outspokenness on desegregation, Braddock received national media attention and was invited to speak at a Congressional subcommittee. Braddock and his family also received numerous threats: his mailbox was blown up in one incident, while in another his wife received a phone call that he would be assassinated. A three week teachers' strike also occurred during his tenure as chair.

Braddock's tenure as chair coincided with his 1970 re-election campaign. After winning the Democratic primary against three segregationist candidates – avoiding a runoff election with a majority of just 228 votes – he faced Republican attorney Edward A. Perse in the general election, who was also a segregationist. Perse argued that Braddock's support of desegregation busing led to a loss of confidence of the school board by county's white residents. Despite this, Braddock was re-elected by a large margin: 148,460 votes to Perse's 82,729, part of a broader local liberal wave and a public affirmation of support for his desegregation policies.

Braddock served on the school board until 2000. At the time of his retirement, he was the longest serving school board member in Florida, and he had won all ten of his election campaigns. Braddock is the namesake of G. Holmes Braddock Senior High School in Miami, which was established in 1989.

== Personal life and death ==
Braddock married his first wife Ruth in 1946. She was the president of the local branch of the American Association of University Women in 1970, and would later become an author of local women's history. The couple had three children, and divorced in 1982. Ruth died in 2024. In 1986, Braddock married his second wife Virginia. They had no children. Braddock was a member of the United Methodist Church in Kendall.

Braddock died on July 24, 2025, one day after his 100th birthday. He was eulogized by MDCPS superintendent José Dotres and Dotres' predecessor Alberto M. Carvalho, with the latter stating that Braddock "shaped the futures of millions of students" and that he was "a champion for education [and] equity".
