= Stranger than Fiction (compilation album) =

Compilation album

Stranger Than Fiction is an album by various performers, most of whom are professional writers and amateur singers, released in 1998 on Kathi Kamen Goldmark's Don't Quit Your Day Job Records. Many of the performers on the album were members of the Rock Bottom Remainders, although the album was probably credited to "the Wrockers" ("writer" + "rocker").

The artists on Stranger Than Fiction include not only many of the Remainders, such as authors Stephen King, Amy Tan, and Dave Barry, but also rock critics Dave Marsh, Ben Fong-Torres, and Greil Marcus, film critic Leonard Maltin, and writers as Norman Mailer and Maya Angelou. Warren Zevon contributed liner notes and a variety of musicians played on the tracks including Jeff Baxter and Jerry Jeff Walker.

Proceeds from this project were contributed to a variety of charities promoting literature and literacy.

== Track listing ==
=== Disc 1 ===
No.	Title	Artist	Length
1.	"Bo Diddley"	Stephen King with Jeff "Skunk" Baxter
2.	"Jungle Hop"	Amy Tan and Kathi Kamen Goldmark, with Wonderbuns Murphy, James W. Hall and Tony Goldmark
3.	"Alimony Blues"	Norman Mailer
4.	"Proofreading Woman"	Dave Barry
5.	"Right Said Fred"	Maya Angelou and Jessica Mitford
6.	"Roly Poly"	Roy Blount, Jr., with Jim Campilongo and the Ten-Gallon Cats
7.	"I Want To Eat"	Oscar Hijuelos
8.	"Baby, It's Cold Outside"	Cynthia Robins and Billy Philadelphia
9.	"Act Naturally"	Leonard Maltin with Meg Mackay
10.	"Rave On"	Bob Greene
11.	"Steamroller Blues"	Susanne Pari
12.	"Double Shot of My Baby's Love"	Sandra Choron, Roger Clark, KK Goldmark, Dian Langlois, Bud E. Luv, Greil Marcus, Susanne Pari, Gail Parenteau, Faith Sale, Joel Selvin, and Amy Tan
13.	"It Wasn't God Who Made Honky Tonk Angels"	Molly Ivins, with Jimmy LaFave, Jerry Jeff Walker and friends
14.	"Chain Gang"	Robert Reich
15.	"On the Good Ship Lollipop"	Tomie dePaola, with Harry Choron and Adaire Elizabeth Kamen
16.	"Stand by Me"	Stephen King, with Warren Zevon

=== Disc 2 ===
No.	Title	Artist	Length
1.	"Rainy Day Bookstores"	Ben Fong-Torres
2.	"Hot Rod Lincoln"	Blanche McCrary Boyd
3.	"Tupperware Blues"	Dave Barry
4.	"Man Smart, Woman Smarter"	Peggy Orenstein
5.	"If I Had a Talking Picture of You"	Leonard Maltin with the Android Sisters
6.	"Johnny Get Angry"	Walter M. Mayes
7.	"These Boots Are Made for Walking"	Amy Tan
8.	"Happy Birthday, Mitzi Gaynor"	Molly Ivins, Bob Livingston and Jerry Jeff Walker, with Ron Erwin, KK Goldmark, Tony Goldmark, John Inmon, Jimmy LaFave, Wonderbuns Murphy, Glenn Schuetz, Stewart Cochran, and the Tourettes
9.	"Wall of Death"	Louis B. Jones, with Kevin Griffin and Nion McEvoy
10.	"You'll Come Back, You Always Do"	Norris Church Mailer
11.	"Wild Thing"	Critical Mess, featuring Roy Blount, Jr., and Dave Marsh, with Lou Aronica, Marc Barasch, The Chorelles, Tom Dupree, Tony Goldmark, Matt Groening, and Peter Schneider
12.	"Busted"	Mary Mackey
13.	"Proud Mary"	Tananarive P. Due, with Warren Zevon and the Tananarettes
14.	"I'm Your Hoochie Coochie Man"	Damn Right I Got the Blues, featuring Ken Follett, with Graham Coster, Richard Gillinson, Anthony Harwood, Cefyn Jones, and Marie-Claire Follett
15.	"Hit the Road Jack"	Digby Diehl and Kay Diehl
16.	"You Can't Judge a Book by the Cover"	Stephen King and Kathi Kamen Goldmark

"Rainy Day Bookstores" is a parody of Bob Dylan's song "Rainy Day Women No. 12 & 35".
