= Steffen Schmidt =

Columbian-American political scientist

- Born: Colombia
- Education: Rollins College; Columbia University
- Known for: Lucken Professor in Political Science
- Scientific career
- Fields: Political science
- Workplaces: Southampton College; Iowa State University

Steffen Walter Schmidt is a Colombian-born political scientist.

Schmidt was born in Colombia and is of German-Jewish descent. He attended Rollins College and earned a doctorate in public law and government from Columbia University. He taught at Southampton College prior to joining the faculty of Iowa State University in 1970. He became a member of Phi Kappa Phi in 1997, was appointed director of international programs for the College of Liberal Arts and Sciences in 2004, and was named inaugural Lucken Professor in Political Science in 2017. Dr. Schmidt has written a number of textbooks regarding the American Government and politics that are used in various colleges in the United States. Upon Schmidt's retirement, he was granted emeritus status and David A. M. Peterson was named Lucken Professor.
