= Marc Randazza =

American attorney

Marc J. Randazza
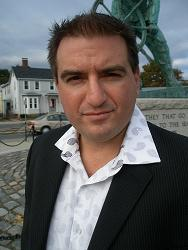
- Born: Marc John Randazza; November 26, 1969 (age 56); Gloucester, Massachusetts, U.S.
- Education: University of Massachusetts Amherst (BA); Georgetown University Law Center (JD); University of Florida (MA); Università di Torino Facoltà di Giurisprudenza (L.L.M. International IP Law, 2014)
- Occupation: Attorney
- Known for: First Amendment advocacy and litigation
- Spouse: Carrie Goldberg
- Website: http://randazza.com/

Marc J. Randazza (born November 26, 1969) is an American attorney who has commented on the law on CNN, InfoWars, and Fox News. He specializes in legal issues pertaining to the First Amendment to the United States Constitution and international intellectual property law.

== Early life and education ==
Randazza was born in Gloucester, Massachusetts. He graduated from Gloucester High School in 1987. Randazza attended the University of Massachusetts Amherst, where he majored in journalism. During his higher education, he wrote a thesis on vote pairing, which was cited by the Court of Appeals for the Ninth Circuit. He later attended the Università di Torino Facoltà di Giurisprudenza, where he earned his LLM degree in International Intellectual Property Law, and he continues to teach in that program.

== Career ==
Randazza is licensed to practice law in Massachusetts (2002), Florida (2003), California (2010), Arizona (2010), and Nevada (2012). Randazza's first case was representing a fraternity at Boston University when the brothers of that fraternity were accused of destroying their house and other misconduct. He then began practicing in Florida as a real estate attorney. He quickly returned to the First Amendment and media field, taking on representation of an adult bookstore in Fort Myers, Florida. Soon thereafter, he moved to Orlando, Florida where his practice in First Amendment and media law expanded. He started representing defendants in SLAPP suits, protestors, and other clients in often controversial constitutional law matters. Among other First Amendment matters, Randazza represented author Toni Marek in Marek v. Phi Theta Kappa (2025), a Texas case involving a temporary restraining order affecting publication of a manuscript.

In 2004, his University of Florida thesis gained attention as vote pairing became a minor issue during the 2004 election. Randazza was asked to debate the issue on Fox News, and thereafter has been a frequent legal commentator on television and in print. Randazza served as a professor of law at Barry University School of Law, located in Orlando, Florida. where he taught First Amendment law, copyright law, trademark law, and entertainment law.

Randazza has a practice that primarily focuses on the areas of First Amendment litigation, adult entertainment, trademark and copyright litigation, and domain name arbitration disputes. He has represented a number of well-known adult entertainment companies including Kink.com, Bang Bus, and Milf Hunter. He also represents media businesses such as BME and bloggers in SLAPP suits.

On Oct. 1, 2014, Randazza was named by Desert Companion Magazine to its top lawyers in Southern Nevada list.

=== Representing controversial figures ===
Randazza has represented controversial figures across the political spectrum, but has received particular attention for representing far-right figures, including Alex Jones, Mike Cernovich, Chuck Johnson, and a Unite the Right rally organizer who used the pseudonym "Kristall.night". He also represented white supremacist Andrew Anglin in a lawsuit filed by a Jewish realtor in Whitefish, Montana, whose name and address Anglin had published on his neo-Nazi website The Daily Stormer, leading to death threats. Randazza's claim of free speech protection for Anglin was rejected by U.S. District Court Judge Dana L. Christensen, who noted that Anglin was actively encouraging and participating in the plaintiff's harassment, and that calls to violence against a private individual are not protected speech.

On other portions of the political spectrum, Randazza has represented perennial candidate Vermin Supreme. In 2017, Randazza helped Supreme obtain a permit to bring a pony to protest a Hillary Clinton book signing. In 2018, Randazza represented Supreme in an effort to run for Attorney General of Kansas. Similarly, he has represented the defendant in Beck v. Eiland-Hall, a case before the World Intellectual Property Organization (WIPO) filed by political commentator Glenn Beck, concerning a satire website parodying Beck. The WIPO arbitrator ruled against Beck in the case, and in favor of Randazza's client.

=== Representing InfoWars ===
Randazza was set to represent Alex Jones, the founder of InfoWars, in a Connecticut Superior Court case in 2018 after the infamous conspiracy theorist was sued by six families of children killed in the 2012 Sandy Hook school shooting. However, when Randazza filed a pro hac vice application to be added to the Sandy Hook case as an out-of-state lawyer, the judge denied it, citing "serious misconduct," namely the discipline arising from the dispute with Liberty Media Holdings noted below. Randazza's firm, however, continued to represent Jones on and off in the litigation, even though Randazza himself did not enter an appearance.

Randazza also represented InfoWars in a copyright dispute over the use of a Pepe the Frog image.

He also filed suit for InfoWars against the Federal Aviation Administration to permit the use of a drone to gather news footage at the U.S./Mexico border.

=== Adult entertainment law ===
Randazza is an advocate for the adult entertainment industry through his First Amendment and intellectual property litigation.

In the Nevada Law Journal, Randazza's article "Freedom of Expression and Morality-Based Impediments to the Enforcement of Intellectual Property Rights," 16 Nev. L.J. 107 (2015) critiques morality clauses in international IP agreements, arguing they undermine free speech by allowing refusals of trademarks for "scandalous" material, such as adult-oriented marks. He extends this in "The Freedom to Film Pornography," 17 Nev. L.J. 97 (2016), examining whether filming adult content constitutes prostitution. He also published The Legal Status of Making Adult Films in Nevada.

Randazza's "Fuck Brief" challenged a refusal of a trademark on morality grounds. In AMA Multimedia, LLC v. Wanat, he pursued copyright claims against pirate site ePorner for unauthorized adult video distribution. Representing Chaturbate and XVideos in cybersquatting disputes, he reclaimed domains like XVideos.es and protects Chaturbate’s trademark rights. He also defended strip club Spearmint Rhino in a trademark battle against Peppermint Hippo, alleging consumer confusion.

=== Anti-SLAPP ===
In 2013, Randazza lobbied the Nevada legislature to update Nevada's Anti-SLAPP statute.

On June 8, 2015, Governor Sandoval signed Nevada Senate bill 444, which in its initial form, stood to largely repeal the Nevada Anti-SLAPP law. The initial form of the law was backed by casino mogul, Steve Wynn. Randazza lobbied to keep the statute in its speech-protective form.

=== Klingon language ===
On April 27, 2016, Randazza filed a friend of the court brief in the lawsuit by Paramount Pictures and CBS against Axanar Productions on behalf of the Language Creation Society. The lawsuit concerned a 21-minute fan-made short film, Prelude to Axanar. Paramount Pictures and CBS claimed, among other things, that the film infringed their rights by making use of the Klingon language. Randazza argued that Klingon is a living language, and, as such, is a "state of mind"—a system or process, which cannot be copyrighted, unlike a work. Randazza contended that since Klingon was invented in the 1980s, the language has expanded past its origins, pointing to examples like dictionaries, translations of Shakespeare, the Klingon Language Institute, official government statements, a wedding conducted in Klingon, and translation service available through Bing. To support its point, portions of the brief were written in Klingon, employing the Klingon alphabet.

Response to the brief was generally positive. Attorney and blogger Kevin Underhill called it "a terrific brief", and Attorney Ken White of Popehat wrote that "Marc continues to demonstrate that legal writing can be entertaining, irreverent, and persuasive at the same time." In an article on the blog Mental Floss, Linguist Arika Okrent particularly praised the incorporation of the Klingon language into arguments. Ethan Chiel of Fusion called the brief "a joy to read" and remarked that it was "wonderful to see what is essentially (very serious) fun being had in demonstrating a point in a legal proceeding."

About three weeks after the brief was filed, in an interview on May 20, 2016, J. J. Abrams said that Paramount would drop the lawsuit "within the next few weeks." Abrams further stated that he pushed the studio to stop the lawsuit because "we realized this is not the appropriate way to deal with the fans."

=== The Satanic Temple ===
In May 2018 The Satanic Temple (TST) sued Twitter for religious discrimination with pro bono support from Randazza. In August, the Los Angeles chapter of TST disaffiliated in protest, calling Randazza a "Twitter troll and an agent of the alt-right."

=== The Gateway Pundit ===
In November 2022, Randazza filed suit on behalf of Jordan Conradson, a reporter for The Gateway Pundit (along with the publisher TGP Communications, LLC), because Conradson was denied a press pass; although a preliminary injunction was denied by the lower court, the Ninth Circuit Court of Appeals granted the injunction because the denial violated the First Amendment—it was not "viewpoint neutral." To the contrary, the Ninth Circuit found "that a predominant reason for the County denying Conradson a press pass was the viewpoint expressed in his writings."

Randazza is also defending The Gateway Pundit in claims brought by two Georgia election workers arising from statements regarding their role in counting the ballots at the State Farm Arena in November 2020.

== Cameras in the Courtroom ==
Randazza has handled a number of "cameras in the courtroom" cases, defending the rights of the news media to attend and televise courtroom proceedings. Most notably, Randazza successfully argued this issue against Alan Dershowitz. In that case, Randazza represented Courtroom View Network in its quest to televise a highly publicized trial in Las Vegas involving the Las Vegas Sands.

== Dispute with Righthaven ==
In late 2011, Randazza and his firm effectively killed Righthaven, a "copyright troll" company briefly infamous for buying limited rights to copyrighted works for the sole purpose of bringing lawsuits against alleged infringers. On May 9, 2013, the United States Court of Appeals for the Ninth Circuit affirmed the lower court's decision dismissing the case for lack of standing. Righthaven complained of what it called Randazza's "scorched earth judgment enforcement efforts" in its legal filings.

== Representation in Button Matter ==
In 2021, Randazza represented former Boston Ballet dancer Dusty Button and her husband, Mitchell Taylor Button. Court documents include claims of federal sex trafficking and forced labor violations against both Dusty and Taylor Button, as well as separate accusations about Taylor Button for assault, battery, false imprisonment, and sexual exploitation of a minor.

== Bawtinheimer Censorship Defense ==
In 2026, Randazza represented Cheryl Bawtinheimer in a copyright dispute brought by the Rapid Relief Team in the United States District Court for the Northern District of California. Bawtinheimer filed an Answer and Counterclaim alleging violations of 17 U.S.C. § 512(f), asserting that takedown notices targeting YouTube videos constituted knowing misrepresentations under the Digital Millennium Copyright Act. The filing also sought declaratory relief that the use of the organization’s logo in a critical context constituted fair use.

=== Dispute with Liberty Media Holdings ===
On June 3, 2015, there was an interim arbitration award against Randazza involving Liberty Media Holdings LLC, for whom Randazza had been General Counsel from 2009 to 2012. The dispute arose following Randazza's departure from Liberty and his filing of employment claims against them. Following his arbitration loss, Randazza filed for Chapter 11 bankruptcy protection, despite having earned more than $1.5 million over three years at Liberty. The arbitration was ultimately vacated in its entirety, by agreement, after the court refused to confirm the arbitration award.

Arising from the same dispute, the State Bar of Nevada charged Randazza with violations of Nevada Rules of Professional Conduct and Randazza entered into a Conditional Guilty Plea as to two allegations: 1.8 (Conflict of Interest: Current Clients: Specific Rules) & 5.6 (Restrictions on Right to Practice); all other claims were dismissed. Randazza was given a one-year suspension, stayed for 18 months, with the requirement that he avoid subsequent ethics complaints for the 18 months following entry of the order, complete 20 hours of CLE classes, and pay the costs associated with the proceedings within 30 days. Reciprocal disciplinary proceedings occurred in other jurisdictions in which Randazza is admitted, including Arizona, Massachusetts, and Florida, where reciprocal discipline was imposed.

== Bibliography ==
- "The Constitutionality of Online Vote Swapping" - 34 Loyola of Los Angeles Law Review 1297 (2001)
- "Breaking Duverger's Law is not Illegal: Strategic Voting, the Internet and the 2000 Presidential Election" - 2001 UCLA Journal of Law and Technology 6
- "The Other Election Controversy of Y2K: Core First Amendment Values and High-Tech Political Coalitions" - 82 Washington University Law Quarterly 143 (2004)
- "The Florida Supreme Court Dulls the Edge of Rule 1.420(e)" - 80 Florida Bar Journal 39 (2006)
- "Gambling in America's Senior Communities" (Daniel Russell, co-author) - 8 Marquette Elder Law Advisor 343 (2007)
- "The Need for a Unified and Cohesive National Anti-SLAPP Law" - 91 Oregon Law Review 627 (2013)
- "Nevada's New Anti-SLAPP Law: The Silver State Sets the Gold Standard" - 21 Nevada Lawyer Magazine 7 (2013)
- "The Legal Status of Making Adult Films in Nevada" - 23 Nevada Lawyer Magazine 20 (2015)
- "Freedom of Expression and Morality Based Impediments to the Enforcement of Intellectual Property Rights" - 16 Nevada Law Journal 107 (2016)
- "Lenz v. Universal: A Call to Reform Section 512(f) of the DMCA and to Strengthen Fair Use" - 18 Vanderbilt Journal of Entertainment & Technology Law (2016)
- "Ulysses: A Mighty Hero in the Fight for Freedom of Expression" - 11 University of Massachusetts Law Review 268 (2016)
