= Sam Barry (author) =

American author, publisher, and musician

- Born: January 26, 1957 (age 69); Armonk, New York, U.S.
- Spouse: Kathi Kamen Goldmark (m. 2009; died 2012)

Samuel Barry (born January 26, 1957) is an American author, columnist, publishing professional, and musician.

== Career ==
Most recently, Sam Barry collaborated with Ellen Harper, coauthoring her memoir: Always a Song: Singers, Songwriters, Sinners & Saints: My Story of the Folk Music Revival, with a foreword by Harper's son Ben Harper. He is the editor of and contributor to the interactive e-book Hard Listening: The Greatest Rock Band Ever (of Authors) Tells All. He is also the author of the humor-inspiration book How to Play the Harmonica: and Other Life Lessons and co-authored the book Write That Book Already! The Tough Love You Need to Get Published Now with his late wife Kathi Kamen Goldmark. Barry and Goldmark wrote Author Enablers, a national column and blog for BookPage. Goldmark died of breast cancer on May 24, 2012. In 2014, Barry oversaw the posthumous publication of Goldmark's novel Her Wild Oats (Untreed Reads Publications).

Barry is the Author Services Liaison at Book Passage, where he heads the Path to Publishing Program. He is a contributing editor at the literary magazine Zyzzyva, and serves on the board of San Francisco's literary festival, Litquake. For many years he wrote the Author Enabler column for the national book review publication BookPage, offering information and encouragement to aspiring authors. He has previously worked for the San Francisco-based imprint of HarperCollins Publishers, HarperOne.

Barry is also a musician who is best known for his harmonica and piano playing. He has performed and toured with the Rock Bottom Remainders, together with his late wife and co-founder of the group Kathi Kamen Goldmark. During the 2020 pandemic Sam joined his Rock Bottom Remainders bandmates and recorded the song "(Don't) Stand By Me" to raise money for bookstore employees. He has frequently appeared on the national radio show West Coast Live, and has been a guest on the Leonard Lopate Show, the Brian Copeland Show, the Peter B. Collins Show, Liz St. John's Peep Show, and Alan Farley's Book Talk.

== Biography ==
=== Early life and education ===
Barry was born in Armonk, New York as the fourth child of David and Marion Barry. His father was a Presbyterian minister and social activist who, as the Executive Director of the New York City Mission Society, worked to improve the lives of people in New York's inner-city. He has three siblings: Mary Katherine Barry, the humorist Dave Barry, and Phil Barry. Barry earned a Bachelor of Arts degree in English from the State University of New York at Purchase in 1981 and a Master of Divinity from the San Francisco Theological Seminary in 1994.

=== Adult life ===
Sam Barry is a musician and author in the San Francisco Bay Area. He also plays with the Rock Bottom Remainders, an all-author rock band founded by Goldmark in 1992. Other members include his brother Dave Barry, Scott Turow, Roy Blount Jr., James McBride, Matt Groening, Greg Iles, Stephen King, Amy Tan, Ridley Pearson and Mitch Albom. The group often performs in support of charitable causes.

Barry is the author of How to Play the Harmonica and Other Life Lessons (2009, Gibbs Smith). He coauthored Write That Book Already!: The Tough Love You Need to Get Published Now (Adams Media, 2010) with his late wife, Kathi Kamen Goldmark. Following Goldmark's death in 2012, Barry edited and contributed to the book Hard Listening: The Greatest Rock Band (of Authors) Ever Tells All (2012, Coliloquy), which tells the story of the band founded by Goldmark, the Rock Bottom Remainders. In 2014 Barry published Goldmark's novel Her Wild Oats (2014, Untreed Reads).

Barry is the co-creator with Jennifer Lou of the humor website The Hilario www.thehilario.com Until late 2017, he was the director of the Path to Publishing program at the well-known independent bookstore Book Passage.

== Works ==
- How to Play the Harmonica: and Other Life Lessons (Gibbs Smith Publisher, 2009)
- Write That Book Already! The Tough Love You Need to Get Published Now (Adams Media, May 2010), co-author Kathi Kamen Goldmark
- Hard Listening: The Greatest Rock Band Ever (of Authors) Tells All (Coliloquy, 2013), editor and co-author with Mitch Albom, Dave Barry, Roy Blount Jr., Matt Groening, Ted Habte-Gabr, Greg Iles, Stephen King, James McBride, Roger McGuinn, Ridley Pearson, Amy Tan & Scott Turow.
- Always a Song: Singers, Songwriters, Sinners & Saints: My Story of the Folk Music Revival (Chronicle Books, January 2021), co-author Ellen Harper
