= Michelle Kaufman =

American journalist

Michelle Kaufman (born 1965) is an American sportswriter and columnist for the Miami Herald. She writes a column every Sunday on sports, focusing on soccer in particular. She also covers tennis, Olympic sports and college and professional sports. She previously worked at the Detroit Free Press and St. Petersburg Times.

Kaufman is the daughter of the late Leonard Kaufman, a professor of Industrial Engineering at Florida State University (FSU). Kaufman is a graduate of the University of Miami, where she worked for the student newspaper, The Miami Hurricane. She also teaches a sports writing course at the university.

In 2005, Kaufman won the Breaking the Glass Ceiling Award, awarded by the Jewish Museum of Florida FIU to Jewish women in Florida who have broken the "glass ceiling" in professional fields that are normally dominated by men.

Kaufman married Miami Herald humor columnist Dave Barry in 1996, with whom she has a daughter, Sophie, born in 2000.
