= Big Trouble (2002 film) =

2002 film by Barry Sonnenfeld

- Theatrical release poster
- Directed by: Barry Sonnenfeld
- Screenplay by: Robert Ramsey; Matthew Stone
- Based on: Big Trouble by Dave Barry
- Produced by: Barry Sonnenfeld; Barry Josephson; Tom Jacobson
- Starring: Tim Allen; Zooey Deschanel; Omar Epps; Dennis Farina; Ben Foster; Janeane Garofalo; Johnny Knoxville; Jason Lee; Dwight “Heavy D” Myers; Rene Russo; Tom Sizemore; Stanley Tucci; Sofia Vergara; Patrick Warburton
- Cinematography: Greg Gardiner
- Edited by: Steven Weisberg
- Music by: James Newton Howard
- Production companies: Touchstone Pictures; The Jacobson Company; Sonnenfeld/Josephson Worldwide Entertainment
- Distributed by: Buena Vista Pictures Distribution
- Release date: April 5, 2002
- Running time: 85 minutes
- Country: United States
- Language: English
- Budget: $40 million
- Box office: $8.5 million

Big Trouble is a 2002 American black comedy film based on the novel Big Trouble by Dave Barry. It was directed by Barry Sonnenfeld and featured a large cast including Tim Allen and Rene Russo with Dennis Farina, Zooey Deschanel, Sofia Vergara, in her film debut, and Jason Lee in supporting roles. Like much of Dave Barry's fiction, it follows a diverse group of people through a series of extremely strange and humorous situations against the backdrop of Miami. Big Trouble was released by Buena Vista Pictures Distribution on April 5, 2002. The film was a box-office bomb as it grossed $8.5 million against a $40 million budget, and received mixed critical reception.

== Plot ==
In a high school game of "Killer," in which a student must shoot another with a squirt gun, Matt Arnold has to "kill" classmate Jenny Herk, so he sneaks up on her at home. By coincidence, hitmen are also there to assassinate Jenny's step-father Arthur Herk who has embezzled money from his company Penultra Corp.

As the fake assassination attempt coincides with the real one, police officers Monica Romero and Walter Kramitz are called out to the resulting disturbance. During the chaos, Matt's friend Andrew calls Matt's father Eliot Arnold. Picking up Matt, Eliot immediately feels a mutual attraction for Jenny's mother Anna Herk. Matt and Jenny are attracted to each other too. Meanwhile, their housemaid Nina falls for Puggy, a young homeless man who lives in a tree on their property. She runs from the shootings and he saves her from the hitmen.

Realizing he is the intended victim, Arthur visits arms dealers to buy a rocket but is sold a suitcase nuclear bomb as the dealer is out of rockets and doesn't tell him what it is. Escaped convicts Snake and Eddie, previously kicked out of the bar for disorderly conduct, hold it up, kidnapping Arthur and bar employee Puggy and taking the suitcase, not knowing its contents.

Meanwhile, when Matt pretends to "kill" Jenny in a mall parking lot, a security guard thinks his gun is real and opens fire on them. Matt and Jenny flee the scene and eventually return to the Herks' home, followed by officers Monica and Walter, who stumble into the confusion. Eliot is called over once again.

The convicts force Arthur to return home where they capture everyone and tie them up. Taking Puggy and Jenny, they leave with the suitcase for the airport. Nina, who was hiding in her room, frees everyone but Monica and Arthur who are handcuffed. Shortly after, the house is visited by two FBI agents tracking the bomb. They free Monica and she leads them to the airport, while Arthur is left behind tripping on a hallucinogenic toad, believing Martha Stewart has possessed the dog.

The criminals, Puggy and Jenny pass through security, where the bomb is inadvertently triggered and its 45-minute timer begins; Puggy escapes in the confusion of boarding. The FBI agents warn that unless the bomb is recovered soon, the plane will have to be shot down. Puggy leads them to the criminals' plane, which Eliot manages to sneak onto. Meanwhile, the two hitmen finally escape the traffic jam caused by Snake and Eddie and reach the airport. There, they bump into Officer Romero, and Special Agents Greer and Seitz, accidentally knocking the hitmen's rifle out of their golf bag in the process. Romero grabs it, renders it useless, and returns it.

Eliot, having sneaked onto the plane, attacks Eddie and Snake with a fire extinguisher. Upon realizing the case holds a bomb, Eliot hurls it out of the open rear door, only for Snake to leap after it. By a stroke of dumb luck, Snake manages to grab onto the door's steps and hang on. Despite Eliot's insistence that the case is a bomb, Snake opens fire on him, prompting Eliot to pull the emergency lever decoupling the door. Snake plunges into the ocean with a defiant smile, still clinging to the bomb, which explodes safely in the water. Eliot is congratulated by the FBI, promised presidential cowboy boots and a hat, and told the events that took place are strictly top secret.

In the last scene: after chasing down a plane, subduing two criminals, and saving Miami from a nuclear disaster, Eliot finally wins Matt's respect. Anna and Eliot marry a week after she divorces Arthur. Walter, after a forced strip search by the airport guards, becomes a male stripper and marries. The hitmen escape Miami after a series of very weird events. They claim their Miami job was the lowest point in their careers. They were surrounded by the fans of Florida Gators on their plane home as a running joke in the film. Eddie goes back to jail in a prison outside of Jacksonville, becoming friends with another dimwitted inmate who has the same affinity for crude jokes. Arthur is last seen still handcuffed and tormented by his dog.

== Cast ==
- Tim Allen as Eliot Arnold: A divorced man, fired from his job at the Miami Herald and running a struggling advertising agency. His teenage son Matt thinks he is a loser.
- Rene Russo as Anna Herk: Jenny's devoted mother and Arthur's wife. She becomes immediately attracted to Eliot upon meeting him.
- Stanley Tucci as Arthur Herk: A rude and obnoxious man marked for death for embezzling from his company.
- Ben Foster as Matt Arnold: Eliot's son and the "killer" of Jenny. He also develops a crush on her.
- Zooey Deschanel as Jenny Herk: Anna's daughter and a classmate of Matt. She is also Matt's target in the school's game "Killer."
- Tom Sizemore as "Snake" Dupree: Bumbling ex-convict.
- Johnny Knoxville as Eddie Leadbetter: Snake's henchman
- Dennis Farina as Henry DeSalvo: Hitman hired to kill Arthur for embezzling.
- Jack Kehler as Leonard Ferroni: Henry's assistant
- Janeane Garofalo as Officer Monica Romero: A competent police officer.
- Patrick Warburton as Officer Walter Kramitz: Monica's incompetent fellow officer. Asks his partner Romero out on dates even though he is married, and flirts with attractive women on duty.
- Dwight "Heavy D" Myers as Special Agent Pat Greer: FBI agent determined to retrieve a missing nuclear bomb.
- Omar Epps as Special Agent Alan Seitz: Pat's partner
- Jason Lee as "Puggy": A homeless wanderer who loves Fritos and Nina.
- Sofía Vergara as Nina: The Herks' young Mexican housemaid. She falls in love with Puggy, whom she initially mistook for Jesus.
- Andy Richter as:
  - Jack Pendick: Ralph's identical twin brother, a security guard with a drinking problem. He sees Matt pointing a squirt gun at Jenny and gives chase while shooting at them with his handgun.
  - Ralph Pendick: Jack's identical twin brother, an equally incompetent security guard at the airport.
- Michael McShane as Bruce: The customer from hell who constantly belittles Eliot's advertisement ideas for his products. He suffers several indignities at the hands of other characters during the movie.
- Daniel London as John / Ivan: Puggy's Russian friend who sells Arthur the bomb.
- Lars Arentz Hansen as Leo: Puggy's other friend.
- DJ Qualls as Andrew Ryan: Matt's school friend and witness for when Matt "kills" Jenny.
- Barry Sonnenfeld as the voice of a Florida Gators fan on a radio (uncredited)

== Production ==
Filming took place entirely in Miami, Florida from July 31 to October 2000.

== Release ==
Big Trouble was originally scheduled for release on September 21, 2001, and had a strong advertising push. The September 11 attacks of that year made the film's comedic smuggling of a nuclear device onto an airplane unpalatable. Consequently, the film was pushed back until April 2002, and the promotion campaign was toned down almost to the point of abandonment.

== Reception ==
Big Trouble came quietly to American theaters and left quickly afterwards, receiving mixed reviews and being generally ignored by audiences, becoming a box office bomb. On Rotten Tomatoes, it has an approval rating of 48% based on 111 reviews, with an average rating of 5.5/10. The site's consensus is "With its large cast and frantic comic pacing, Big Trouble labors for slapstick-style hilarity, but it never really gains steam." On Metacritic, it has a score of 47% based on reviews from 32 critics, indicating "mixed or average" reviews. Audiences polled by CinemaScore gave the film an average grade of "C+" on an A+ to F scale.

Joe Leydon of Variety called it "A genially amusing ensemble farce that doesn't quite achieve enough momentum for liftoff."
