= Tricky Business (novel) =

American novel

- First edition
- Author: Dave Barry
- Language: English
- Genre: Novel/ Humor
- Publisher: Putnam
- Publication date: 2002
- Publication place: United States
- ISBN: 978-1491509692
- Preceded by: Big Trouble
- Followed by: Insane City

Tricky Business is Dave Barry's second novel. It was first published in 2002. Like his previous novel, Big Trouble, its events take place over only 1–2 days, in and around Miami, Florida.

== Synopsis ==
The Extravaganza of the Seas is a gambling ship headed into a tropical storm, with more immediate trouble in the form of gamblers, crime bosses, gangsters and other shady characters fighting over money and drugs. Wally, a clueless rock guitarist, and Fay, a clever CGIS agent posing as a cocktail waitress, serve as the romantic leads.

== Reception ==
The book received mixed reviews. CNN said that Barry was "very good" at this new direction, writing his first crime comedy. Kirkus Reviews said that the book's low humor would appeal to "all those guys who keep America moving slightly off-course and to the women who love them." Publishers Weekly wrote that Barry showed his "penchant" for potty humor and slapstick, but was able to craft "some captivating characters and keep a reader's attention" throughout.
