= Dave Barry's History of the Millennium (So Far) =

2007 book

- First edition
- Author: Dave Barry
- Illustrator: Jeff and Susie MacNelly, Chris Cassatt, and Gary Brooklins
- Cover artist: Andrea Ho
- Language: English
- Genre: History—Humor
- Publisher: G. P. Putnam's Sons
- Publication date: 2007
- Publication place: United States
- Media type: Print (hardcover)
- Pages: 208 pp
- ISBN: 978-0-399-15437-9
- OCLC: 123079194

Dave Barry's History of the Millennium (So Far) is a book written by humorist author Dave Barry and published in 2007 by G. P. Putnam's Sons. The book is a collection of Barry's "Year in Review" articles for the years 2000 through 2006, as well as an introductory chapter that covers the events of the previous millennium.
