= Post Hunt =

The Post Hunt was a puzzlehunt in Washington, D.C., run annually from 2008 to 2016.

It was created by Miami Herald columnist Dave Barry, Gene Weingarten, and Tom Shroder, in the spirit of the Tropic Hunt they had run in Miami, Florida, since 1984.

The inaugural run, hosted by the Washington Post Magazine in downtown Washington, D.C., drew about 5,000 people, including dozens who came up from South Florida. In 2015, for the first time in 10 years, Gene Weingarten, now a columnist for the Post Magazine, joined Shroder, now editor of the Post Magazine, and Barry in designing the Hunt. The final hunt took place on May 22, 2016.

== Format ==
The Hunt consisted of three parts. Answering the "opening questions" directed Hunters to five puzzle sites scattered through the Hunt area. Solving the five Hunt puzzles—the answer was always a number—indicates the five authentic clues on a list of dozens of numbered bogus clues. Hunters had three hours to solve the puzzles, then at 3 p.m., a sixth and final clue was announced from the main stage. This began the "endgame", the day's most difficult puzzle. Solving the endgame often leads to a phone number, or directs Hunters to go to a certain out-of-the-way location and give a password to someone identified in a cryptic way.

== Winners ==
- 2016: Benjamin McRae, Erin McRae, Mark Swiatek, and Michael Engard
- 2015: Todd Etter, Chris Guthrie, Matthew Hartman, and Charlie Scarborough
- 2014: Todd Etter, David Forrest, Chris Guthrie, and Charlie Scarborough
- 2013: solo participant Sean Memon
- 2012: Phil Spector, 35, of Washington; Sabita Soneji, 35, of Washington; John Mackedon, 34, of Washington; Mark Cackler, 57, of Falls Church; Timothy Bouley, 31, of Washington; Madalina Cristoloveanu, 31, of Washington; Ebony Sunala Johnson of Maryland; Kris White, 29, of Washington; Sean Sharifi, 30, of Vienna; Nicole Mechem, 32, of Washington; Damon Taaffe, 35, of Arlington; Alva Kretschmer, 27, of Washington; Patricia Van de Velde, 27, of Washington
- 2011: Sean and Diana Viera, Alex Elliott, Kevin Chang, James Auwaerter, Amy Posten and Galen Mullins
- 2010: John Sanders, Eana Chung, Eric Pilar, Chris Wong, Suzanne Schwartz, Joe Grossman and Katie Elder
- 2009: David Shahoulian, Emma Filstrup, Serena Hoy, Jim Reilly, Jenny Hunter, and Tom Jawetz
- 2008: Todd Etter, David Forrest, Chris Guthrie, and Jack Reda
