= Herald Hunt =

Annual puzzle hunt

The Herald Hunt, formerly the Tropic Hunt, is an annual puzzle hunt in Miami, Florida. It was co-created by Miami Herald columnist Dave Barry, along with Tropic editors Gene Weingarten and Tom Shroder. The Tropic Hunt debuted in 1984, and as of 2018 there have been a total of 18 Hunts (plus one played-from-home 'non-hunt'). The winners of the 2011 Herald Hunt were Jeffrey Kobal, Cheryl Kobal, and Adam Horowitz.

== Early history and name change ==
The hunt got its name from the Sunday magazine supplement to the Miami Herald called Tropic, in which Dave Barry had a regular column. For the Hunt, the magazine, and a large section of South Florida, were turned into a large scavenger hunt/puzzle, which has attracted thousands of people from all over the United States. The hunt in 1998 was the last Tropic Hunt, because the Miami Herald ceased publishing Tropic magazine shortly thereafter. The Miami Herald reinstated the hunt in 2001, now calling it the Herald Hunt. It creates a special magazine section each time for the Hunt.

== Format ==
The first two years, the Hunt was a car-based chase around South Florida, In 1986, it changed to the still current design, where Hunters gathered in one walkable urban neighborhood. Hunts have been held in Downtown Miami, South Miami, Miami Beach, Coconut Grove, Coral Gables, and Hollywood.

The Hunt consists of three parts. Answering the "opening questions" directs Hunters to five puzzle sites scattered through the Hunt area. Solving the five Hunt puzzles—the answer is always a number—indicates the five authentic clues on a list of dozens of numbered bogus clues. Hunters have three hours to solve the puzzles, then at 3 p.m., a sixth and final clue is announced from the main stage. This begins the "endgame", which is by far the most difficult puzzle of the day. Solving the endgame often leads to a phone number, or directs Hunters to go to a certain out-of-the-way location and give a password to someone identified in a cryptic way. In 2007, Hunters who solved the endgame knew they needed to find a sandwich. Only when they arrived at a location marked on the Hunt Map with a sandwich, they saw a sign that said "Right idea. Wrong one." In fact, they had to go to a location on the beach, marked with a witch. In other words, a "sand witch." If they went to that spot on the beach, they saw a Hunt volunteer wearing a witch's hat and holding a broom.

== Post Hunt ==
Since the Hunt became the Herald Hunt in 2001, it has been designed by Barry and Shroder. In May 2008, the Washington Post Magazine held a Hunt in downtown Washington DC, attended by about 5,000 people, including dozens who came up from South Florida. The May 17, 2009, Post Hunt attracted an estimated 10,000 participants.

For the first time in 10 years, Gene Weingarten, now a columnist for the Post Magazine, joined Shroder, now editor of the Post Magazine, and Barry in designing the Hunt. The winners of the 2010 Post Hunt were John Sanders, Joe Grossman, Chris Wong, Eric Pilar, Katie Elder, Eana Chung, and Suzanne Schwartz.
