= David Petersen =

David Petersen or Dave Petersen may refer to:

- David Petersen (composer) (1650/1–1737), violinist and composer of north German origin active in the Netherlands
- David Petersen (sculptor) (born 1944), Welsh sculptor
- David L. Petersen (born 1943), American theologian
- David Petersen (comics) (born 1977), American comic book creator
- Dave Petersen (born 1992), English rugby league player
- David Petersen (Arizona politician), Arizona politician

== See also ==
- David Peterson (disambiguation)
