= Dave Barry Turns 50 =

- First edition
- Author: Dave Barry
- Language: English
- Genre: Humor
- Publisher: Crown
- Publication date: 1998
- Publication place: United States
- Pages: 218

Dave Barry Turns 50 is a humor book written by humor columnist Dave Barry, about turning 50, and reminiscing on the events of the Baby Boomer generation, as well as satirical advice on aging. The book includes the first known instance of the Waiter Rule—"If someone is nice to you but rude to the waiter, they are not a nice person."
