= Dave Barry =

American author and columnist (born 1947)

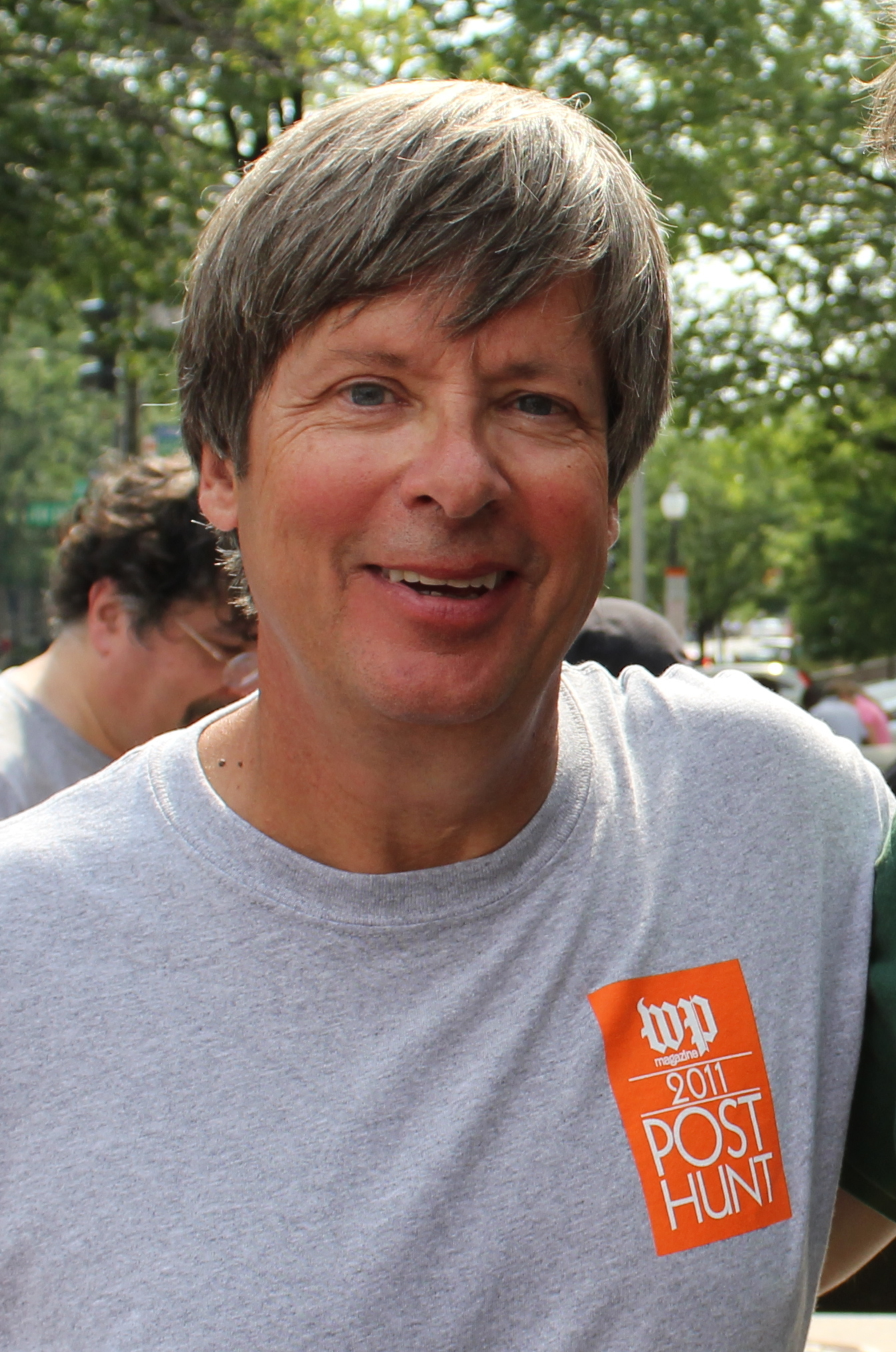
- Barry at the 2011 Washington Post Hunt
- Born: David McAlister Barry; July 3, 1947 (age 79); Armonk, New York, U.S.
- Education: Haverford College (BA)
- Occupations: Humorist; Author
- Spouse(s): Ann Shelnutt (1969–19?) Beth Lenox (m. 1976; div. 1993) Michelle Kaufman (m. 1996)
- Children: 2
- Website: davebarry.com

Signature
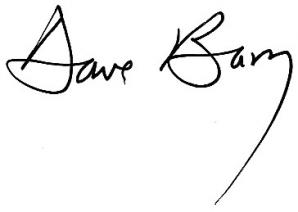

David McAlister Barry (born 3 July 1947) is an American author and columnist who wrote a nationally syndicated humor column for the Miami Herald from 1983 to 2005. He has written numerous books of humor and parody, as well as comic novels and children's novels. Barry's honors include the Pulitzer Prize for Commentary (1988) and the Walter Cronkite Award for Excellence in Journalism (2005).

Barry has defined a sense of humor as "a measurement of the extent to which we realize that we are trapped in a world almost totally devoid of reason. Laughter is how we express the anxiety we feel at this knowledge".

== Early life and education ==
Barry was born in Armonk, New York, where his father, David W. Barry, was a Presbyterian minister. He was educated at Wampus Elementary School, Harold C. Crittenden Junior High School (both in Armonk), and Pleasantville High School, where he was elected "Class Clown" in 1965. He earned a Bachelor of Arts degree in English from Haverford College in 1969.

As an alumnus of a Quaker-affiliated college, he avoided military service during the Vietnam War by registering as a religious conscientious objector. Barry decided "early on" that he was an atheist. He said,

"The problem with writing about religion is that you run the risk of offending sincerely religious people, and then they come after you with machetes."

== Writing career ==
Barry began his journalism career in 1971, working as a general-assignment reporter for the Daily Local News in West Chester, Pennsylvania. He covered local government and civic events and was promoted to city editor after about two years. He also started writing a weekly humor column for the newspaper and began to develop his unique style. He remained at the newspaper through 1974. He then worked briefly as a copy editor at the Philadelphia bureau of Associated Press before joining Burger Associates, a consulting firm.

At Burger, he taught effective writing to businesspeople. In his own words, he

"spent nearly eight years trying to get various businesspersons to ... stop writing things like 'Enclosed please find the enclosed enclosures,' but ... eventually realized that it was hopeless."

In 1981, he wrote a humorous guest column in The Philadelphia Inquirer about watching the birth of his son, which attracted the attention of Gene Weingarten, then an editor of the Miami Herald Sunday magazine, Tropic. Weingarten hired Barry as a humor columnist in 1983. Barry's column was syndicated nationally. Barry won a Pulitzer Prize for Commentary in 1988 for "his consistently effective use of humor as a device for presenting fresh insights into serious concerns".

Barry's first novel, Big Trouble, was published in 1999. The book was adapted into a motion picture directed by Barry Sonnenfeld and starring Tim Allen, Rene Russo, and Patrick Warburton, with a cameo by Barry (deleted in post-production). The movie was originally due for release in September 2001, but was postponed following the September 11, 2001 attacks because the story involved terrorists smuggling a nuclear weapon onto an airplane. The film was released in April 2002.

In response to a column in which Barry mocked the cities of Grand Forks, North Dakota, and East Grand Forks, Minnesota, for calling themselves the "Grand Cities", Grand Forks named a sewage pumping station after Barry in January 2002. Barry traveled to Grand Forks for the dedication ceremony.

Articles written by Barry have appeared in publications such as Boating, Home Office Computing, and Reader's Digest, in addition to the Chicken Soup for the Soul inspirational book series. Two of his articles have been included in The Best American Sports Writing series. One of his columns was used as the introduction to the book Pirattitude!: So You Wanna Be a Pirate? Here's How! (ISBN 0-451-21649-0), a follow-up to Barry's role in publicizing International Talk Like a Pirate Day. His books have frequently appeared on The New York Times Best Seller list.

On 31 October 2004, Barry announced that he would be taking an indefinite leave of absence, of at least a year, from his weekly column to spend more time with his family. In December 2005, Barry said in an interview with Editor & Publisher that he would not resume his weekly column, although he would continue such features as his yearly gift guide, his year-in-review feature, and his blog, as well as an occasional article or column.

In 2005, Barry won the Walter Cronkite Award for Excellence in Journalism.

== Dave's World television series ==
From 1993 to 1997, CBS broadcast the sitcom Dave's World based on the books Dave Barry Turns 40 and Dave Barry's Greatest Hits. The show starred Harry Anderson as Barry and DeLane Matthews as his wife Beth. In an early episode, Barry appeared in a cameo role. After four seasons, the program was canceled shortly after being moved from its "coveted" Monday night slot to the "Friday night death slot", so named because of its association with low viewership.

== Music ==
During college, Barry was in a band called the Federal Duck (the band issued a self-titled album on Musicor Records in 1968, but by that time Barry was no longer in the group). While at the Miami Herald, he and several of his colleagues created a band called the Urban Professionals, with Barry on lead guitar and vocals. They performed an original song called "The Tupperware Song" at the Tupperware headquarters in Orlando, Florida.

Beginning in 1992, Barry played lead guitar in the Rock Bottom Remainders, a rock band made up of published authors. Remainder is a publishing term for a book that does not sell. The band was founded by Barry's sister-in-law, Kathi Kamen Goldmark, for an American Booksellers Association convention, and has included Stephen King, Amy Tan, Ridley Pearson, Scott Turow, Mitch Albom, Roy Blount Jr., Barbara Kingsolver, Matt Groening, and Barry's brother Sam, among others. According to Barry, the band's members "are not musically skilled, but they are extremely loud". Several high-profile musicians, including Al Kooper, Warren Zevon, and Roger McGuinn have performed with the band, and Bruce Springsteen sat in at least once. The band's road tour resulted in the book, Mid-Life Confidential: The Rock Bottom Remainders tour America with three chords and an attitude. The Rock Bottom Remainders disbanded in 2012 following Goldmark's death from breast cancer. They have reunited several times, performing at the Tucson Festival of Books in 2016 and 2018.

== Other activities ==
Beginning in 1984, Barry and Tropic editors Gene Weingarten and Tom Shroder have organized the Tropic Hunt (now the Herald Hunt), an annual puzzlehunt in Miami. A Washington, D.C., spinoff, the Post Hunt, began in 2008.

Barry has run several mock campaigns for president of the United States, running on a libertarian platform. He has also written for the Libertarian Party's national newsletter.

The screen adaptation of Barry's book Dave Barry's Complete Guide to Guys was released in 2005; it is available on DVD.

== Personal life ==
Barry married Lois Ann Shelnutt in 1969. He married Beth Lenox in 1976. Barry and Lenox worked together at the Daily Local News, where they began their journalism careers on the same day in September 1971; they had one child, Robert, born 1980. Barry and Lenox divorced in 1993. In 1996, Barry married Miami Herald sportswriter Michelle Kaufman; they had a daughter, Sophie, in 2000.

Barry's father and his youngest brother suffered from alcoholism, and his father died in 1984; his sister Mary Katherine was institutionalized for schizophrenia; and his mother died by suicide in 1987.

Barry has had dogs named Goldie, Earnest, Zippy, and Lucy, all of whom he mentioned regularly in his columns.

== Works ==
=== Non-fiction ===
- The Taming of the Screw (1983) (with illustrator Jerry O'Brien)
- Babies and Other Hazards of Sex: How to Make a Tiny Person in Only 9 Months with Tools You Probably Have Around the Home (1984) (with illustrator Jerry O'Brien)
- Stay Fit and Healthy Until You're Dead (1985) (with illustrator Jerry O'Brien)
- Claw Your Way to the Top: How to Become the Head of a Major Corporation in Roughly a Week (1986) (with illustrator Jerry O'Brien)
- Dave Barry's Guide to Marriage and / or Sex (1987) (with illustrator Jerry O'Brien)
- Homes and Other Black Holes (1988)
- Dave Barry Slept Here: A Sort of History of the United States (1989)
- Dave Barry Turns 40 (1990)
- Dave Barry's Only Travel Guide You'll Ever Need (1991)
- Dave Barry's Guide to Life (1991) (includes Dave Barry's Guide to Marriage and / or Sex, Babies and Other Hazards of Sex, Stay Fit and Healthy Until You're Dead, and Claw Your Way to the Top)
- Dave Barry Does Japan (1992)
- Dave Barry's Gift Guide to End All Gift Guides (1994)
- Dave Barry's Complete Guide to Guys (1996)
- Dave Barry in Cyberspace (1996)
- Dave Barry's Book of Bad Songs (1997)
- Dave Barry Turns 50 (1998)
- Dave Barry Hits Below the Beltway: A Vicious and Unprovoked Attack on Our Most Cherished Political Institutions (2001)
- "My Teenage Son's Goal in Life is to Make Me Feel 3,500 Years Old" and Other Thoughts On Parenting From Dave Barry (2001)
- "The Greatest Invention in the History Of Mankind Is Beer" and Other Manly Insights from Dave Barry (2001)
- Dave Barry's Money Secrets (2006)
- Dave Barry on Dads (2007)
- Dave Barry's History of the Millennium (So Far) (2007)
- I'll Mature When I'm Dead: Dave Barry's Amazing Tales of Adulthood (2010)
- You Can Date Boys When You're Forty: Dave Barry on Parenting and Other Topics He Knows Very Little About (2014)
- Live Right and Find Happiness (Although Beer is Much Faster): Life Lessons and Other Ravings from Dave Barry (2015)
- Best. State. Ever.: A Florida Man Defends His Homeland (2015)
- Live Right and Find Happiness (Although Beer is Much Faster): Life Lessons and Other Ravings from Dave Barry
- For This We Left Egypt?: A Passover Haggadah for Jews and Those who Love Them (2017) (with Alan Zweibel and Adam Mansbach)
- Lessons from Lucy (2019)
- A Field Guide to the Jewish People (2019) (with Adam Mansbach and Alan Zweibel)
- Class Clown: The Memoirs of a Professional Wiseass: How I Went 77 Years Without Growing Up (2025)

=== Collected columns ===
- Dave Barry's Bad Habits: A 100% Fact-Free Book (1985)
- Dave Barry's Greatest Hits (1988)
- Dave Barry Talks Back (1991)
- The World According to Dave Barry (1994) (includes Dave Barry Talks Back, Dave Barry turns 40 and Dave Barry's Greatest Hits)
- Dave Barry is NOT Making This Up (1995)
- Dave Barry Is from Mars and Venus (1997)
- Dave Barry Is Not Taking This Sitting Down (2000)
- Boogers Are My Beat (2003)

=== Fiction ===
- Big Trouble (1999). ISBN 978-0-399-14567-4.
- Tricky Business (2002). ISBN 978-1491509692.
- Peter and the Starcatchers (2004) (with Ridley Pearson. ISBN 0-7868-3790-X.
- Peter and the Shadow Thieves (2006) (with Ridley Pearson). ISBN 0-7868-3787-X.
- Peter and the Secret of Rundoon (2007) (with Ridley Pearson). ISBN 0-7868-3788-8.
- Escape From the Carnivale (2006) (with Ridley Pearson). ISBN 0-7868-3789-6.
- The Shepherd, the Angel, and Walter the Christmas Miracle Dog (2006). ISBN 978-0425217740.
- Cave of the Dark Wind (2007) (with Ridley Pearson. ISBN 0-7868-3790-X.
- Science Fair (2008) (with Ridley Pearson. ISBN 978-1423113249.
- Peter and the Sword of Mercy (2009) (with Ridley Pearson). ISBN 978-1423130703.
- Blood Tide (2008) (with Ridley Pearson). ISBN 978-0786837915.
- The Bridge to Neverland (2011) (with Ridley Pearson). ISBN 978-0425253373.
- Lunatics (2012) (with Alan Zweibel). ISBN 978-0425253373.
- Insane City (2013). ISBN 978-0399158681.
- The Worst Class Trip Ever (2015). ISBN 978-1484708491.
- The Worst Night Ever (2016). ISBN 978-1484708507.
- Swamp Story (2023). ISBN 978-1982191337.

=== Film adaptations ===
- Big Trouble (2002)
- Dave Barry's Complete Guide to Guys (2005)
- Peter and the Starcatchers (Disney project, announced 17 May 2012. Release date TBA)

=== Collaborations ===
- Mid-Life Confidential: The Rock Bottom Remainders tour America with three chords and an attitude (1994), with Stephen King, Kathi Kamen Goldmark, Al Kooper, Ridley Pearson, Roy Blount, Jr., Joel Selvin, Amy Tan, Dave Marsh, Tad Bartimus, Matt Groening, Greil Marcus, Tabitha King, Barbara Kingsolver, Michael Dorris
- Naked Came the Manatee (1998) with Carl Hiaasen, Elmore Leonard, James W. Hall, Edna Buchanan, Les Standiford, Paul Levine, Brian Antoni, Tananarive Due, John Dufresne, Vicki Hendricks, Carolina Hospital, Evelyn Mayerson
- Novels (as listed above) with Ridley Pearson and Alan Zweibel
- Hard Listening, (July 2013) is an interactive e‑book about his participation in a writer / musician band, the Rock Bottom Remainders, digital publisher Coliloquy.

=== Audio recordings ===
- A Totally Random Evening With Dave Barry (1992)
- A Prairie Home Companion: English Majors: A Comedy Collection for the Highly Literate (as guest) (1997)
- Stranger than Fiction (1998)

== See also ==
- Exploding whale
- International Talk Like a Pirate Day
