= Tom Shroder =

American journalist

Tom Shroder (born 1954 in New York City) is an American journalist, writer and editor who worked for the Washington Post for many years.

== Biography ==
Shroder is the author of The Most Famous Writer Who Ever Lived: A True Story of My Family (2016) an investigation into the life of his grandfather, Pulitzer Prize-winning novelist MacKinlay Kantor; Acid Test: LSD, Ecstasy and the Power to Heal (2014) about the resurgence of research into the medical use of psychedelic drugs, ghost writer of the New York Times bestseller The Operator: Firing the Shots That Killed Bin Laden and My Years as a Seal Team Warrior by Robert O'Neill, co-author with John Konrad of Fire on the Horizon: the Untold Story of the Gulf Oil Disaster (2011), and sole author of Old Souls: Scientific Evidence From Children Who Remember Previous Lives (1999), based on the work of Canadian psychiatrist Ian Stevenson.

Naked Came the Manatee (1996) was conceived and edited by Shroder. Seeing the Light: Wilderness and Salvation: A Photographer’s Tale (1995) was written by him and John Barry.

As editor of The Washington Post Magazine, he oversaw staff writer Gene Weingarten's two Pulitzer Prize-winning feature stories, "Fiddler in the Subway" (2008) and "Fatal Distraction" (2010). As an independent editor he has edited such New York Times bestsellers as Overwhelmed: Work, Love and Play When No One has the Time by Brigid Schulte and Top Secret America by Dana Priest and William Arkin. Shroder also edited and serves as advisor to the play The Manic Monologues.

Shroder's The Hunt for Bin Laden (2011) based on 15 years working for the Washington Post, became the #1-selling Kindle single on Amazon.com. Shroder is also known for co-creating the Tropic Hunt, a mass-participation puzzle attended by thousands each year, which has become the Herald Hunt in Miami and the Post Hunt in Washington.

In September 2016, Shroder joined Fusion as standards editor.

Shroder attended the University of Florida.

== See also ==
- Richard's Poor Almanac
- Gene Weingarten
- Dave Barry
- The Manic Monologues
