= David L. Peterson =

American scientist

David L. Peterson (born 1954) is an Emeritus Senior Scientist (formerly research biologist) with the United States Forest Service and professor at the School of Environmental and Forest Sciences, at the University of Washington. He was also a co-founder and lead scientist for the Western Mountain Initiative, a consortium of researchers known world-wide for their work on the effects of climate change on mountain ecosystems.

== Biography ==
Peterson received a Ph.D. in 1980 from the University of Illinois, and has published over 200 scientific papers in dendroclimatology, ozone air pollution, climate change and adaptation to global warming, and decision support systems for fire management.

He was invited to serve on the board of the Intergovernmental Panel on Climate Change (IPCC). He has also received awards: from the International Union of Forestry Research Organizations (IUFRO), the "Chief's Award", the highest honor within the US Forest Service, and honorary life membership in the Northwest Scientific Association for his leadership in research in the Pacific Northwest, USA.

Peterson is a lead investigator for forest ecosystems for the National Climate Assessment, and lead author for the first comprehensive guidebook for adapting to climate change on U.S. forest lands. He continues to lead adaptation to climate change on federal, state, tribal, and private lands.

Peterson is lead or co-author of four books: Ecological Scale: Theory and Applications (1998), Human Ecology and Climate Change (1995), Climate Change and United States Forests (2014), and Climate Change and Rocky Mountain Ecosystems (2018).
