= Kathi Kamen Goldmark =

American author, publishing consultant, producer, and musician (1948–2012)

- Born: August 18, 1948 Brooklyn, New York, U.S.
- Died: May 24, 2012 (aged 63) San Francisco, California, U.S.
- Occupation: Writer, columnist, publishing consultant, radio/music producer
- Spouse: Joe Goldmark (m. 1981; div. 2002) Sam Barry (m. 2009–2012)

Kathi Kamen Goldmark (August 18, 1948 – May 24, 2012) was an American author, columnist, publishing consultant, radio and music producer, songwriter, and musician. Goldmark was the author of the novel And My Shoes Keep Walking Back to You, co-authored or contributed to numerous other books, wrote a monthly column for BookPage with her husband, author and musician Sam Barry and produced the radio show West Coast Live. She was a member of the San Francisco band Los Train Wreck, and founding member of the all-author rock band the Rock Bottom Remainders. As President of "Don't Quit Your Day Job" Records, she supervised the production of ten music and spoken-word CDs.

== Early life ==
Kathi Kamen was born in Brooklyn, New York, the first child of Betty and Seymour Kamen, and raised in Cold Spring Harbor, New York. Her parents were photographers who later became educators and writers in the field of health and nutrition. She has two brothers: Paul, a naval architect and writer, and Michael, a college professor. Kathi earned a Bachelor of Arts degree from Antioch College in Yellow Springs, Ohio in 1971, a master's degree from Goddard College in Plainfield, Vermont in 1974, and a California teaching credential in 1974.

== Career ==
In 1972, Kamen moved to Los Angeles with her boyfriend Jim Hodder. Hodder soon became known as the original drummer in Steely Dan, while Kamen worked as a drama teacher at Modern Playschool/Play Mountain Place, a private school in Culver City, California. In 1974, she was recruited to direct The Rock Project (a media-education campaign about alternatives to unwanted pregnancy, directed at teenagers) for a non-profit organization, The Population Institute. She moved the project's headquarters to San Francisco in 1976 and worked for the Population Institute, then the Center for Population Options, until 1980.

She married her first husband, Joe Goldmark, in 1981; their son Tony Goldmark was born two years later. Kathi and Joe Goldmark were divorced in 2002. In 2009, she married Sam Barry.

In 1983, Kathi Kamen Goldmark started Goldmark Media Escorts, a company specializing in working with authors on book tours in San Francisco. In 1992, Goldmark recruited a dozen well-known authors to join her in putting on a rock and roll show at a book convention. Meant to last one night, the Rock Bottom Remainders were still performing as of 2010, and hde raised nearly two million dollars for charity.

Shortly after the Remainders' first shows, Goldmark was introduced to Jessica Mitford by Maya Angelou. Mitford performed "Maxwell's Silver Hammer" in a Goldmark-produced literary talent show. This led to recordings of Mitford and Angelou singing as "Decca and the Dectones", and the beginning of Goldmark's boutique record label, "Don't Quit Your Day Job" Records. She was a member of the National Academy of Recording Arts and Sciences at this time. In 1994, her original song "Heartaches for a Guy" was included in the soundtrack of The Stand. Another fan favorite performed with the Rock Bottom Remainders was her raunchy lament, "Older Than Him." Since January 1, 1992, Goldmark and pedal-steel guitarist David Phillips have hosted monthly music jams at San Francisco nightclubs. Their band was called Los Train Wreck and included Sam Barry (keyboard and harmonica), Todd Swenson (guitar), Paul Olguin (bass), Peter Tucker (drums), and guest performers (such as author Ben Fong-Torres) at El Rio, a venue in San Francisco's Mission District.

Goldmark's first published work was an essay titled "I'll Take the Blame" in Mid-Life Confidential: the Rock Bottom Remainders Tour America with Three Chords and an Attitude, published by Viking/Signet in 1994. In 1997, she co-authored The Great Rock & Roll Joke Book, published by St. Martin's Press, with Dave Marsh. Her first novel, And My Shoes Keep Walking Back to You, was published by Chronicle Books in 2002. She contributed personal essays to several other collections published between 2004 and 2010. Her final book, co-authored with Sam Barry, was Write That Book Already!: The Tough Love You Need to Get Published Now, published by Adams Media in 2010. From 2004 through 2010, Goldmark served as author liaison for the Friends of the San Francisco Public Library's annual Literary Laureates dinner, and in 2007, 2008, and 2009 as author liaison and one of the organizers of Book Group Expo, an annual event for book lovers in San Jose, California.

== Death ==
She died of breast cancer on May 24, 2012. She is survived by her second husband, Sam Barry, their three adult children, Tony Goldmark, Daniel Barry, and Laura Barry; her mother, Betty Kamen; and her brothers Paul and Michael.

== Works ==
- And My Shoes Keep Walking Back to You (a novel: Chronicle Books)
- Her Wild Oats (a novel: Untreed Reads Publishing)
- Write That Book Already! (co-author, Adams Media)
- The Great Rock & Roll Joke Book (co-author, St. Martin's Press)
- The Face in the Mirror (contributor—Prometheus Books)
- Feed Me! (contributor—Ballantine Books)
- Single Woman of a Certain Age (contributor – Inner Ocean Press)
- My California: Journeys by Great Writers (contributor – Angel City Press)
- How I Got Published (contributor—Writer's Digest Books)
- Instant City: A Literary Exploration of San Francisco (contributor, Volume 1)
- Mid-Life Confidential: The Rock Bottom Remainders Tour America with Three Chords and an Attitude (contributor, Viking/Signet)
- Food that Rocks: Favorite Recipes from the Hottest Kitchens in Music (contributor, Conari Press)
- He Said What?: Women Write about Moments When Everything Changed (contributor – Seal Press)
- Exit Laughing: How Humor Takes the Sting Out of Death (contributor - North Atlantic Books)

== Charitable work ==
In addition to founding the Rock Bottom Remainders, whose shows have raised funds for grass-roots literacy programs, Goldmark donated her time to committees and fundraising events connected to the publishing world, including:

- Selection Committee member, San Francisco's One City One Book campaign;
- Advisory Committee member, San Francisco Writers Conference;
- Litquake Board of Directors member
- Legal Services for Children's "Words, Wine, and Wit" event committee member

== Awards and honors ==
Kathi Kamen Goldmark was recognized by the following institutions for her work in support of literacy:

- Leadership Award, Literary Volunteers of America, 1993: Awarded to all of the Rock Bottom Remainders.
- Certificate of Appreciation from the City of Los Angeles, April 25, 2003: "In recognition and appreciation for being a champion of literacy and your efforts supporting the after school creative writing program for inner city kids, America Scores."
- Certificate of Commendation from the California Arts Council, 2006: for contributing to the anthology My California
- Honored as a San Francisco Library Laureate, 2007.
- Recipient, Women's National Book Association Award, 2008
- Certificate of Honor from the San Francisco Board of Supervisors, November 8, 2008: "in appreciation of your extraordinary contribution to promoting literacy, freedom of expression, a love of reading, or women's careers in the world of books."
- November 8, 2008: "Kathi Kamen Goldmark Day" in San Francisco by Mayoral Proclamation: "...in celebration of receiving the prestigious 2008 Women's National Book Association Award."
- Certificate of Recognition from the California Legislature, November 8, 2008: for "...outstanding achievements in the arts and literary fields."

== "Don't Quit Your Day Job" Records releases ==
=== Music ===
- Decca & the Dectones, featuring Jessica Mitford (1995)
- There is a Moral to It All: Musical Duets by Maya Angelou and Jessica Mitford (1995)
- Lit-Rock Sampler #1 (various author/artists, 1996)
- You Bug Me!: Songs Guaranteed to Annoy Your Parents (Tony Goldmark, 1996)
- Potty Animal: funny songs about potty training (Auntie Poo and the Porta-Potties, 1997)
- Stranger than Fiction (The Wrockers—an assortment of 40 authors singing their favorite songs, 1998)
- Masterpiece Weirder (Tony Goldmark, 2001)
- Rage Against the Mundane (Tony Goldmark, 2004)
- Goldmark After Dark (Tony Goldmark, 2014)

=== Spoken Word ===
- Required Reading and Other Dangerous Subjects (Amy Tan, 1996)
- A Celebration on the Occasion of Guy Johnson's 50th Birthday (Maya Angelou, Guy Johnson, Janice Mirikitani, 1996)
