= William P. Foster (swindler) =

American jurist from Virginia

William P. Foster (fl. 1810s) was an American swindler from Virginia who obtained an appointment to the Illinois Supreme Court, but never served.

Foster was appointed to the Illinois Supreme Court on October 9, 1818, by the Illinois State Legislature, having charmed the legislators with his charisma, and having no previous experience as a lawyer. Foster never met with the Supreme Court, and never presided over his assigned circuit court. He resigned on July 7, 1819, before the Supreme Court's first December session.

After leaving Illinois, Foster made a living "moving from city to city and living by swindling strangers and prostituting his daughters, who were very beautiful".

== Bibliography ==
- Scott, John M (1896). Supreme Court of Illinois, 1818. Bloomington, IL. pp. 14–35.
