= Dave Barry in Cyberspace =

- First edition
- Author: Dave Barry
- Language: English
- Publisher: Crown
- Publication date: 1996
- Pages: 215 (hardcover edition)
- ISBN: 0-517-59575-3
- OCLC: 37823051

Dave Barry in Cyberspace is a best-selling humor book by Dave Barry. Written in 1996, this book takes the view point of a computer geek who enjoys using Windows 95. The book covers (in a comical way) such topics as The History of Computing, How Computers Work, Software, and even mundane topics such as Internet shorthand.

The book starts out with what it calls "A Brief History of Computing from Cave Walls to Windows 95" where it describes how certain aspects of computing (such as emoticons (hieroglyphics)) have existed for thousands of years. As the book progresses, it drifts off to some more sexual topics (in a more humorous than sexual manner). It talks about everything from Quicken to chat rooms and everything in between. It also has some fictitious excerpts from chat room conversations. The book ends with a fictional story from the second-person viewpoint of a married, stay-at-home mom and her gradual acceptance of and proficiency at using the family PC, especially surfing the Internet through the AOL online service. Eventually, she meets an English teacher online, and the two develop feelings for one another. The story ends with them deciding they should meet in person, even though this potentially will change their lives forever. There has been speculation that this is a fictionalized retelling of Dave Barry's relationship with his current wife Michelle; the male character's online name in the AOL chat rooms is RayAdverb, an anagram of Dave Barry. This theory has not been confirmed by Barry. (Barry's Twitter handle is RayAdverb.)
