= Jeff Mondak =

American poet and songwriter (born 1962)

Jeff Mondak (born March 26, 1962) is an American poet and songwriter who has written nearly 200 children's poems, along with many songs for both children and adults. In February 2016, Jeff released his first solo poetry collection, The Toy Box Ate My Brother, with illustration by Mew Tachibana. Jeff is also a political science professor, currently the James M. Benson Chair in Public Issues and Civic Leadership in the Department of Political Science at the University of Illinois. Jeff lives with his family in Champaign, Il.

== Biography ==
Jeff Mondak, a native of Cleveland, Ohio, has travelled all over the world and has lived in Florida, Indiana, Michigan, and Pennsylvania. He has been discussing poetry and performing his poems in elementary and middle schools since 1998. Jeff's whimsical poems and songs have appeared in numerous books and magazines, such as Cricket and Spider. Jeff's songs have been played on NPR's "All Things Considered," the Dr. Demento Show, and several children's music programs. In 2009, the National Youth Choir of Scotland began performing two of Jeff’s songs, and Jeff co-wrote the song "Hardwired" with popular folk musician Christine Lavin.

== Awards ==
- "Genie, Please Hurry" — Letter of merit from the Society of Children's Book Writers & Illustrators
- "Pluto's Not a Planet Anymore" — Physics Song of the Month, American Association of Physics Teachers
- Songramp.com Artist of the Month

== Works ==
Mondak's poetry and songs have been featured in: One Minute till Bedtime (Little, Brown, 2016), When Granny Won Olympic Gold (A&C Black, 2012), Dance Shoes For GG (CJ Fallon, 2011), The Pluto Files (W.W. Norton, 2009), I Hope I Don't Strike Out (Meadowbrook, 2008), Peter, Peter Pizza Eater (Meadowbrook, 2006), My Teacher's In Detention (Meadowbrook, 2006), The Ultimate Guide to Celebrating Kids, Vol. II (Bluegrass, 2005), Rolling in the Aisles (Meadowbrook, 2004), Singgold 2 (National Youth Choir of Scotland, 2009), Singsilver 2 (National Youth Choir of Scotland, 2009), and the audio CDs Michael Closed the Bathroom Door (JPFK, 2008) and Halloween Treats (Allegheny Music Works, 2007) and Mick Brady's Triple the Pickle. In 2013, Jeff released his own CD, "Nobody Knows Where Our Bus Driver Goes.' The CD features Jeff reciting over 30 of his poems, with each poem accompanied by a musical track. In 2015, the Champaign, IL rock band NxT, with members including Jeff's son Chris, released a CD, Sounds Familiar. Jeff wrote the lyrics to ten of the CD's thirteen songs.
