= David A. M. Peterson =

American political scientist (born 1973)

David A. M. Peterson (born 18 January 1973) is an American political scientist.

Peterson's mother is Canadian. After her first husband's death in the 1967 USS Forrestal fire, she moved to Seattle and married Peterson's father. When Peterson was three, his father died in a drunk driving incident, and the family moved to Canada. They later returned to the United States. Peterson credits his mother with sparking his interest in politics, and the 1992 United States presidential election for his focus on third party campaigns.

He graduated from Gustavus Adolphus College and completed doctoral studies at the University of Minnesota in 2000. Peterson then taught at Texas A&M University until 2009, when he joined the Iowa State University faculty. In 2015, he succeeded Jeff Mondak and Tom Rudolph as editor of the journal Political Behavior. Peterson stepped down as editor in 2019, and was replaced by Geoffrey Layman and Benjamin Radcliff. In 2020, Peterson was appointed to the Lucken Professorship in Political Science.
