= Courtroom View Network =

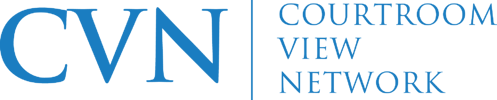
- Type: Private
- Industry: Legal
- Founded: 2006
- Headquarters: Atlanta, Georgia, United States
- Products: Courtroom Video
- Website: www.cvn.com

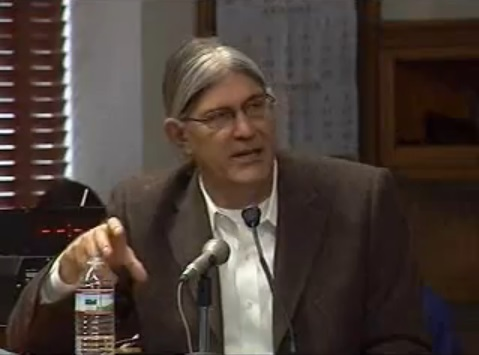
Witness testimony captured by CVN

Courtroom View Network (CVN), a division of Courtroom Connect, is a US company webcasting live and on-demand video and editorial coverage from civil trials.

== Overview ==
CVN webcasts civil litigation proceedings live and offers on-demand subscriptions to their Video Library. CVN's Video Library is an archive of thousands of hours of fully-indexed, searchable courtroom video. CVN's video has been used by the New York Times, Wall Street Journal, Reuters, Bloomberg, Associated Press, TheStreet, The American Lawyer, and LawyersUSA.

== Background ==
CVN was founded in 2006 and is headquartered in Atlanta, Georgia.

== Litigation ==
On October 14, 2008, the United States District Court for the Southern District of New York held that CVN was entitled to webcast a federal hearing over the objection of one of the parties.

On April 16, 2009, a federal district court's order allowing CVN to webcast a hearing in a high-profile copyright infringement case was reversed by the United States Court of Appeals for the First Circuit, which blocked the webcast.

On December 3, 2010, the Massachusetts Supreme Judicial Court ruled that Courtroom View Network was a member of the news media and a news gathering organization entitled to webcast courtroom proceedings in Massachusetts.
