= Peter Foster (judge) =

British Judge

Sir Peter Foster MBE, TD

Justice of the High Court
- In office 1969–1983

Personal details
- Born: Peter Harry Batson Woodroffe Foster; 5 December 1912
- Died: 10 May 1985 (aged 72)
- Children: 4

Sir Peter Harry Batson Woodroffe Foster, MBE, TD (5 December 1912 – 10 May 1985) was an English barrister and High Court judge from 1969 to 1983.

== Biography ==
The son of Frank Foster, Peter Foster was educated at Rugby School and Corpus Christi College, Cambridge (BA, LLB). He was called to the Bar by the Inner Temple in 1936.

During the Second World War, Foster served with the Fife and Forfar Yeomanry. He saw action at Dunkirk with the 8th Armoured Division, El Alamein with the 18th Army Group, Tripoli with the 21st Army Group, and finally in North-Western Europe. He achieved the rank of colonel, was appointed MBE in 1943, and was mentioned in despatches three times. He received the Territorial Decoration in 1946.

After the war, Foster returned to the Bar, and practiced in Chancery in the chambers of Andrew Clark. He became a Queen's Counsel in 1957. He became a Bencher of Lincoln's Inn in 1963.

He was a member of the General Council of the Bar from 1956 to 1960, of the Senate from 1966 to 1969 and from 1976 to 1979, and chairman of the Chancery Bar Association from 1963 to 1968. In addition, he was Church Commissioner for England from 1965 to 1969, Reserve Chairman of the Conscientious Objectors Tribunal from 1965 to 1969, and chairman of the Performing Right Tribunal in 1969.

Foster was appointed to the High Court of Justice in 1969, received the customary knighthood. He was assigned to the Chancery Division, and retired in 1983. He coined the expression "a moron in a hurry" in the 1978 case Morning Star Cooperative Society v Express Newspapers Limited.

Foster married Jane Hillcoat Easdale in 1937; they had a son and three daughters.
