= Foster (surname) =

Surname list

The given name Foster is a variation of the surname Forster, meaning one who 'works in the forest'. It may also derive from the French forcetier, meaning 'maker of scissors'. It is both a given name and a surname.

In the 2010 United States Census, Foster ranked #99 in surname popularity.

== Notable people with the surname "Foster" include ==
=== A ===
- A. Lawrence Foster (1802–1877), American politician
- Abiel Foster (1735–1806), American religious leader and politician
- A. Carville Foster (1932–2022), American politician
- Addison G. Foster (1837–1917), American businessman
- Adriance S. Foster (1901–1973), American botanist
- Adrianna Foster (born 1986), Mexican musician
- Akeem Foster (born 1987), Canadian football player
- Al Foster (1943–2025), American jazz drummer
- Alexander Foster (rugby union) (1890–1972), Irish rugby union footballer
- Alexandra Föster (born 2002), German rower
- Alison Foster (born 1957), British judge
- Allan Foster (1925–1987), Australian politician
- Allen Foster (1887–1916), English footballer
- Amos Foster (1880–1952), American football player
- Ami Foster (born 1975), American actress
- Andrea Foster (born 1997), Guyanese runner
- Andy Foster (politician) (born 1961), New Zealand politician
- Andy Foster (sports commissioner) (born 1979), American athletic administrator
- Angelique Foster, British politician
- Ann Foster (c.1617–1692), English witch
- Ann Foster (died 1674) (??–1674), English witch
- Anna Foster (journalist) (born 1979), English radio presenter
- Anthony Foster (1705–1779), Irish politician
- Anthony Foster (activist) (1953–2017), Australian activist
- Antigone Foster, English-Australian recording artist
- Arian Foster (born 1986), American football player
- Arlene Foster (born 1970), Northern Ireland politician
- Augustus Foster (1780–1848), British diplomat

=== B ===
- Basil Foster (1882–1959), English actor and cricketer
- Belinda J. Foster, American attorney
- Bernard Foster (born 1931), British boxer
- Bert Foster (1906–1942), Australian rules footballer
- Bertha Foster (1881–1968), American academic administrator
- Bertie Foster (1884–1959), English footballer
- Billy Foster (1937–1967), Canadian auto racing driver
- Blake Foster (born 1985), American actor
- Bobby Foster (1929–2006), English footballer
- Bon Foster (1955–1991), American lawyer
- Brandon Foster (born 1984), American football player
- Bren Foster, Australian actor
- Brenda Jefferson Foster (1955–2010), American witness
- Brendan Foster (born 1948), British runner
- Brenden Foster (1997–2008), American fundraiser
- Brent Foster (born 1967), New Zealand athlete
- Brent Foster (director) (born 1982), Canadian film director
- Brigitte Foster-Hylton (born 1974), retired Jamaican athlete
- Bruce Foster, American engineer
- Bryce Foster (born 2002), American football player
- Bryson Foster, American activist
- Bud Foster (born 1959), American football coach
- Buddy Foster (born 1957), American actor

=== C ===
- C. Allen Foster (born 1941), American lawyer
- Caleb Foster (born 2004), American basketball player
- Cameron Foster (born 1999), American baseball player
- Carey Foster (1835–1919), English chemist
- Carla Foster, British social figure
- Carlton Foster (1826–1901), American businessman and politician
- Caroline Rose Foster (1877–1979), American farmer
- Carson Foster (born 2001), American swimmer
- Cassius Gaius Foster (1837–1899), American judge
- Cathy Foster (born 1956), British sailor
- Cecil Foster (born 1954), Canadian writer
- Cecil G. Foster (1925–2016), American pilot
- Charles Foster, multiple people
- Cheryl Foster (born 1980), Welsh football referee
- Claiborne Foster (1896–1981), American actress
- Clare Foster (born 1980), British actress
- Clement le Neve Foster (1841–1904), British geologist
- Clive Foster, Christian pastor and UK's first Windrush Commissioner
- Clyde Foster (1931–2019), American scientist and mathematician
- Colin Foster (born 1964), English footballer
- Colin Foster (footballer, born 1952) (born 1952), English footballer
- Corey Foster (born 1969), Canadian ice hockey player
- C. Stephen Foster, American ophthalmologist
- C. W. Foster (1866–1935), English clergyman

=== D ===
- Dale Foster (born 1958), Australian rules footballer
- Daren Foster (born 1966), English cricketer
- Darryl Foster (born 1961), American activist
- Daryl Foster (born 1938), Australian cricket coach
- Dawn Foster (1986–2021), British journalist
- D'Chrome Foster (born 1977), American singer
- Defne Joy Foster (1975–2011), Turkish actress
- DeShaun Foster (born 1980), American football player
- Diane Foster (sprinter) (1928–1999), Canadian track athlete
- Diane Foster (curler) (born 1955/1956), Canadian curler
- Dianne Foster (1928–2019), Canadian actress
- Dixon Foster (1888–1973), American athletic coach
- D. J. Foster (born 1993), American football player
- Dodshon Foster (1730–1793), English merchant
- Donte Foster (born 1990), American football player
- Dudley Foster (1925–1973), British actor
- Duke Foster (1929–1973), American football player
- Dwayne Foster, American football coach

=== E ===
- Ebenezer Foster (??–1792), English judge
- Eddie Foster (baseball) (1887–1927), American baseball player
- Eddie Foster (American football) (born 1954), American football player
- Edith Dunham Foster (1864–1950), American filmmaker
- Edna Foster (1900–??), American actress
- Edwin Michael Foster (1917–2013), American microbiologist and food scientist
- Eileen Foster, American corporate executive
- Eleazer Foster (1841–1899), American lawyer
- Eleazer Kingsbury Foster (1813–1877), American lawyer and politician
- Elena Ochoa Foster (born 1958), Spanish art curator
- Eliza Foster (1802–1888), English author
- Eliza Clayland Tomlinson Foster (1788–1855), American settler
- Elmer Foster (1861–1946), American baseball player
- E. M. Foster, English novelist
- Émilie Foster, Canadian politician
- Emily Foster (1842–1897), New Zealand teacher
- Emmanuel Foster (1921–1965), English footballer
- Emory S. Foster (1839–1902), American general
- Enid Foster (1895–1979), American sculptor
- Enoch Foster (1839–1913), American judge
- E. P. Foster (1848–1932), American entrepreneur
- Ephraim H. Foster (1794–1854), American politician
- Erin Foster, American writer
- Ernest Foster (1873–1956), English cricketer
- Eugie Foster (1971–2014), American columnist
- Evelyn Foster (1902–1931), English taxi driver
- Ezola Foster (1938–2018), American activist

=== F ===
- Fiona Foster, British television journalist
- Flora Foster (??–1914), American actress
- Foz Foster (born 1960), English composer
- Frances Foster (1924–1997), American actress
- Francis Foster, English comedian, podcaster
- Fred Foster (1931–2019), American record producer
- Freddie Foster (born 1995), English cricketer
- Frederic de Peyster Foster (1849–1929), American lawyer
- Fredericka Foster (born 1944), American artist

=== G ===
- G. C. Foster (1885–1966), Jamaican sportsman
- Gene Foster (born 1942), American football player
- Genevieve Foster (1893–1979), American illustrator
- Geoffrey Foster (1884–1971), English cricketer
- Gerald Foster (painter) (1900–1987), American painter
- Gigi Foster, Australian economist
- Gilbert Lafayette Foster (1874–1940), Canadian surgeon general
- Giles Foster, English television director
- Gillian Foster (born 1976), Australian footballer
- Giraud Foster (1850–1945), American businessman
- Glen Foster (1930–1999), American sailor
- Glen Foster (comedian), Canadian comedian
- Glenn Foster (1990–2021), American football player
- Gloria Foster (1933–2001), American actress
- Gordon Foster (1921–2010), Irish engineer
- Graças Foster (born 1953), Brazilian businesswoman
- Graeme Foster, Australian rugby league footballer
- Grant Foster (born 1945), Australian composer
- Gregory Foster (1866–1931), English academic administrator
- Gwendolyn Audrey Foster (born 1960), American academic
- Gwin Foster (1903–1954), American guitarist
- Guy Mark Foster, American writer

=== H ===
- Hadley Foster (born 1975), American athletics administrator
- Hal Foster (1892–1982), Canadian-American comic writer
- Hal Foster (art critic) (born 1955), American art critic
- Hannah Webster Foster (1758/1759–1840), American novelist
- Harold D. Foster (1943–2009), Canadian geographer and geomorphologist
- Heather Foster (born 1966), Jamaican-American bodybuilder
- Herman Foster (1928–1999), American pianist
- Hubert Foster (1855–1919), British army officer
- Hugh F. Foster Jr. (1918–2004), American general
- Hunter Foster (born 1969), American entertainer

=== I ===
- Idris Foster (1911–1984), Welsh scholar
- Ira Roe Foster (1811–1885), American teacher and politician
- Isaiah Foster (born 2003), American soccer player
- Israel Moore Foster (1873–1950), American politician
- Ivan Foster (born 1943), Northern Irish minister

=== J ===
- Jabez Foster (footballer) (1902–??), English footballer
- Jackie Foster (1903–??), English footballer
- Jacqueline Foster (born 1947), British politician
- Jacqueline Foster (bowls) (born 1975), Canadian lawn bowler
- Jakari Foster (born 2003), American football player
- Jake Foster (born 1988), Australian rugby league footballer
- Jamie S. Foster, American biologist
- Jarrey Foster (born 1996), American basketball player
- Jason Foster (born 1988), American football player
- Javon Foster (born 2000), American football player
- Jayson Foster (born 1985), American football player
- J. D. Foster (born 1953), American record producer
- Jean Foster (born 1972), American sports shooter
- Jeanne Robert Foster (1879–1970), American poet
- Jeannette Howard Foster (1895–1981), American librarian
- Jedediah Foster (1726–1779), English judge
- Jeff Foster (disambiguation), multiple people
- Je'Kel Foster (born 1983), American basketball player
- Jen Foster, American singer-songwriter
- Jennifer Foster, English archaeologist
- Jennifer Foster (equestrian) (born 1964), Canadian equestrian
- Jerome Foster II (born 2002), American activist
- Jerome Foster (American football) (born 1960), American football player
- Jerry Foster (1907–1984), Scottish rugby union footballer
- J. Morris Foster (1881–1966), American actor
- Joana Foster (1946–2016), Ghanaian-British activist
- Joanna Foster (born 1964), British actress
- Jodie Foster (born 1962), American actress
- Joel Foster (1814–1945), American farmer
- Joey Foster (born 1982), British racing driver
- Jonathan Foster (musician) (born 1979), American singer-songwriter and musician
- Josephine Foster, American musician
- Joshua L. Foster (1824–1900), American architect
- Joy Foster, Jamaican table tennis player
- Joyce Foster (born 1944), American politician
- Judith Ellen Foster (1840–1910), American lecturer
- Julia Foster (born 1943), English actress
- Juliann Bluitt Foster (1938–2019), American dentist
- Julie Foster (born 1969), Canadian rugby union footballer
- Juliette Foster (born 1964), British television journalist

=== K ===
- Kareem Foster (born 2000), Caymanian footballer
- Karith Foster (born 1974), American comedian
- Kathi Foster (born 1947), American politician
- Kathryn Foster, American soap opera director
- Katrina Foster (born 1968), American Lutheran bishop
- Keith Foster (born 1948), Jamaican singer
- Kenny Foster (born 1985), American mixed martial artist
- Kent Foster (born 1938), British military officer
- Kitty Foster (1790–1863), American freed slave
- Kmele Foster (born 1980), American entrepreneur
- Kris Foster (born 1974), American baseball player
- Krishna Foster (born 1970), American chemist
- Kurtis Foster (born 1981), Canadian ice hockey player

=== L ===
- Lafayette L. Foster (1851–1901), American academic administrator, politician, and journalist
- Lafayette S. Foster (1806–1880), American politician and judge
- Larry Foster (American football) (born 1976), American football player
- Larry Foster (baseball) (1937–2023), American baseball player
- Laura E. Foster (1871–1920), American illustrator and cartoonist
- Lawrence Foster (born 1941), American conductor
- Leland Foster (1910–??), American baseball player
- Leo Foster (born 1951), American baseball player
- Leon Foster (1913–1991), Barbadian cricketer
- Lewis Foster (rugby league) (born 1993), English rugby league footballer
- Lewis R. Foster (1898–1974), American screenwriter
- Lilibet Foster, American film director
- Lillian Foster (??–1963), Canadian journalist
- Linae Foster, American video game producer
- Lindsay Foster (??–2020), Australian judge
- Lisa Foster, Canadian actress
- Little Willy Foster (1922–1987), American singer-songwriter
- Lizzie Foster (1856–1948), British archer
- Lori Foster, American writer
- Lorraine Foster (born 1938), American mathematician
- Louis Foster (born 2003), British racing driver
- Lucas Foster, American film producer
- Lucas Foster (snowboarder) (born 1999), American snowboarder
- Lucia Foster, American economist
- Lucian R. Foster (1806–1876), American photographer
- Luke Foster (born 1985), English footballer
- Luther H. Foster Jr. (1913–1994), American academic administrator
- Lydia Mary Foster (1867–1943), Irish writer
- Lyle Foster (born 2000), South African footballer
- Lynn Foster (1914–1985), Australian playwright

=== M ===
- M. A. Foster (1939–2020), American writer
- Maalique Foster (born 1996), Jamaican footballer
- Mac Foster (1942–2010), American boxer
- Marcia Lane Foster (1897–1983), English artist
- Marcus Foster (1923–1973), American educator
- Marcus Foster (basketball) (born 1995), American basketball player
- Margaretta Foster (1737–1824), Irish peeress
- Margot Foster (born 1958), Australian rower
- Marian Foster (born 1948), English television presenter
- Marie Foster (1917–2003), American activist
- Marion Foster (writer) (1924–1997), Canadian broadcaster
- Marjorie Foster (1893–1974), English farmer
- Martha M. Foster, American business executive
- Marty Foster (born 1963), American baseball umpire
- Mary-Jane Foster, American lawyer
- Mason Foster (born 1989), American football player
- Matt Foster (born 1995), American baseball player
- Matthew Foster (born 2000), Irish cricketer
- Matty Foster (born 2001), English rugby league footballer
- Max Foster (born 1972), American news correspondent
- Mayhew Foster (1911–2011), American soldier
- Meg Foster, American actress
- Megan Foster (born 1992), American rugby union footballer
- Meghann Foster, American politician
- Melvin Foster (born 1971), American boxer
- Mercedes S. Foster (born 1942), American zoologist
- Michael Foster Jr. (born 2003), American basketball power forward in the Israeli Basketball Premier League
- Mo Foster (1944–2023), English instrumentalist
- Morris Foster (1936–2020), Irish cyclist
- Morrison Foster (1823–1904), American business agent
- Montorie Foster (born 2001), American football player
- Mulford B. Foster (1888–1978), American botanist
- Muriel Foster (1877–1937), English soprano
- Murphy J. Foster (1849–1921), American politician
- Murray Foster (born 1967), Canadian musician
- Myles Birket Foster (1825–1899), English painter

=== N ===
- Nancilea Foster (born 1983), American diver
- Nat Foster (1766–1840), American pioneer
- Neal Foster (born 1972), American politician
- Neil Foster (born 1962), English cricketer
- Neville Foster (1890–1978), English cricketer
- Nick Foster (disambiguation), multiple people
- Norman Foster, English architect
- Norris Foster (1855–1925), English barrister

=== O ===
- Orpha Woods Foster (1850–1938), American pioneer
- Otha Foster (born 1988), American football player
- Owen Foster (born 2005), English footballer

=== P ===
- Pat Foster (born 1939), American basketball coach
- Patrick Foster (born 1987), Kenyan-English cricketer
- Paulinus Foster (1811–1861), American lawyer and politician
- Phil Foster (1913–1985), American actor
- Phil Foster (politician) (born 1958), American politician
- Philip Foster (1805–1884), American businessman
- Philip Foster (British politician) (1865–1933), American politician
- Phoebe Foster (1896–1975), American actress
- Pop Foster (1878–1944), American baseball player
- Pops Foster (1892–1969), American musician
- Preston Foster (1901–1970), American actor

=== R ===
- Radney Foster (born 1959), American musician
- Ramon Foster (born 1986), American football player
- Randolph Foster (athlete) (born 1968), Costa Rican sprinter
- Randolph Sinks Foster (1820–1903), American bishop
- R. E. Foster (1878–1914), English cricketer and footballer
- Reb Foster (1936–2019), American disc jockey
- Rebecca Salome Foster (1848–1902), American missionary
- Red Dawn Foster, American politician
- Reddy Foster (1864–1908), American baseball player
- Reg Foster (1904–1999), British journalist
- Renardo Foster (born 1984), American football player
- Reuben Foster (born 1994), American football player
- Reuben Foster (politician) (1833–1898), American politician
- Rhesa Foster (born 1998), American long jumper
- Rick Foster, American guitarist
- R. L. Foster (1919–2005), American politician
- Robert Foster multiple people
- Roberta Foster (born 1961), Barbadian equestrian
- Robin B. Foster, American botanist
- Rod Foster (born 1960), American basketball player
- Rodney Foster (born 1941), English golfer
- Roger Sherman Baldwin Foster (1857–1924), American lawyer
- Ronnie Foster (born 1950), American musician
- Rube Foster (1879–1930), American baseball player
- Rube Foster (AL pitcher) (1888–1976), American baseball player
- Rufus Edward Foster (1871–1942), American judge
- Rusty Foster, American programmer
- Ruth S. Foster, American Politician
- Ruth Foster (1920–2012), American actress
- Ruthie Foster (born 1964), American singer-songwriter
- Ryan Foster (athlete) (born 1988), American runner
- Rylee Foster (born 1988), Canadian soccer player

=== S ===
- Sally Foster, Scottish archaeologist
- Sesshu Foster (born 1957), American poet
- Sewell Foster (1792–1868), Canadian politician
- Shan Foster (born 1986), American basketball player
- Shanise Foster (born 1993), Jamaican footballer
- Shawn Foster, American television director
- Sheila Foster, English academic
- Sheri Foster (born 1957), American actress
- Sidney Foster (1917–1977), American pianist
- Stan Foster, American actor
- Stanley Foster (1885–1965), New Zealand surgeon
- Stella Foster, American journalist
- Stephanie Foster (rower) (born 1958), New Zealand rower
- Stephanie Foster (politician) (born 1967), American politician
- Sue Foster, English snooker player
- Susanna Foster (1924–2009), American actress
- Sutton Foster (born 1975), American entertainer
- Sydney Foster (1921–2007), Jamaican hurdler
- Sydney F. Foster (1893–1973), American judge

=== T ===
- Tameka Foster (born 1971), American fashion stylist
- Terry Foster (born 1959), American sports columnist
- Theodore Foster (1752–1828), American politician
- Therese Mary Foster, New Zealand psychologist
- Tiffany Foster (born 1984), Canadian equestrian
- Tina Monshipour Foster, Iranian-American lawyer
- Toby Foster (born 1969), British comedian
- Todd Foster (born 1967), American boxer
- Tommy Foster (born 2002), British racing driver
- Toni Foster (born 1971), American basketball player
- Tony Foster (1853–1918), New Zealand lecturer
- Tony Foster (artist) (born 1946), British environmentalist
- Trevor Foster (1914–2005), Welsh rugby union footballer
- Trevor Foster (drummer), English drummer

=== V ===
- Vera Chandler Foster (1915–2001), American social worker
- Vere Foster (1819–1900), English philanthropist
- Veronica Foster (1922–2000), Canadian cultural figure
- Vince Foster (1945–1993), American attorney
- Vine Cynthia Colby Foster (1852–1878), American medical practitioner

=== W ===
- Warren Foster (1904–1971), American writer
- Wayne Foster (born 1963), English footballer
- Wendell Foster (1924–2019), American politician
- Wilbur F. Foster (1841–1900), American politician, lawyer
- Wilder D. Foster (1819–1873), American politician
- Wilfrid Foster (1874–1958), English army officer and cricketer
- William Harrison Foster (1841–1903), American physician
- Winston Foster (born 1941), English footballer

=== Y ===
- Yip Foster (1907–1978), Canadian ice hockey player

=== Z ===
- Zelda Foster (1934–2006), American social worker

== Disambiguation pages ==
=== A ===
- Adrian Foster (disambiguation)
- Alan Foster (disambiguation)
- Alex Foster (disambiguation)
- Alfred Foster (disambiguation)
- Amy Foster (disambiguation)
- Andrew Foster (disambiguation)
- Arthur Foster (disambiguation)
- Asa Foster (disambiguation)

=== B ===
- Barry Foster (disambiguation)
- Ben Foster (disambiguation)
- Bill Foster (disambiguation)
- Bob Foster (disambiguation)
- Bradley Foster (disambiguation)
- Brian Foster (disambiguation)

=== C ===
- Catherine Foster (disambiguation)
- Charles Foster (disambiguation)
- Christopher Foster (disambiguation)
- Craig Foster (disambiguation)

=== D ===
- Daniel Foster (disambiguation)
- David Foster (disambiguation)
- Derek Foster (disambiguation)
- Donald Foster (disambiguation)
- Douglas Foster (disambiguation)
- Dwight Foster (disambiguation)

=== E ===
- Edward Foster (disambiguation)
- Eric Foster (disambiguation)

=== F ===
- Frank Foster (disambiguation)
- Frederick Foster (disambiguation)

=== G ===
- Gary Foster (disambiguation)
- Geoff Foster (disambiguation)
- George Foster (disambiguation)
- Graham Foster (disambiguation)
- Greg Foster (disambiguation)

=== H ===
- Harold Foster (disambiguation)
- Harry Foster (disambiguation)
- Helen Foster (disambiguation)
- Henry Foster (disambiguation)

=== I ===
- Ian Foster (disambiguation)

=== J ===
- Jack Foster (disambiguation)
- James Foster (disambiguation)
- Jane Foster (disambiguation)
- Jeff Foster (disambiguation)
- Jim Foster (disambiguation)
- John Foster (disambiguation)
- Jon Foster (disambiguation)
- Joseph Foster (disambiguation)

=== K ===
- Kate Foster (disambiguation)
- Kathleen Foster (disambiguation)
- Kathy Foster (disambiguation)
- Kenneth Foster (disambiguation)
- Kevin Foster (disambiguation)
- Kimberly Foster (disambiguation)

=== L ===
- Leroy Foster (disambiguation)
- Linda Foster (disambiguation)

=== M ===
- Margaret Foster (disambiguation)
- Mark Foster (disambiguation)
- Martin Foster (disambiguation)
- Mary Foster (disambiguation)
- Maurice Foster (disambiguation)
- Michael Foster (disambiguation)

=== N ===
- Nathaniel Foster (disambiguation)
- Nigel Foster (disambiguation)
- Norman Foster (disambiguation)

=== P ===
- Paul Foster (disambiguation)
- Peter Foster (disambiguation)

=== R ===
- Ralph Foster (disambiguation)
- Red Foster (disambiguation)
- Reginald Foster (disambiguation)
- R. F. Foster (disambiguation)
- Richard Foster (disambiguation)
- Robert Foster (disambiguation)
- Ron Foster (disambiguation)
- Roy Foster (disambiguation)

=== S ===
- Samuel Foster (disambiguation)
- Sarah Foster (disambiguation)
- Scott Foster (disambiguation)
- Stephen Foster (disambiguation)
- Steve Foster (disambiguation)

=== T ===
- Thomas Foster (disambiguation)
- Timothy Foster (disambiguation)

=== W ===
- Walter Foster (disambiguation)
- Will Foster (disambiguation)
- William Foster (disambiguation)

== Fictional characters ==
- Aidan Foster, a character on the soap opera Neighbours
- Anne Foster, a character on the soap opera Coronation Street
- Cassandra Foster, a character on the television series All My Children
- Frankie Foster, a character on the animated series Foster's Home for Imaginary Friends
- Hayley Foster, a character on the television series Power Rangers Ninja Steel
- Jonny Foster, a character on the soap opera Emmerdale
- Snapper Foster, a character on soap opera The Young and the Restless

== See also ==
- Foster (given name), a page for people with the given name "Foster"
- Foster (disambiguation), a disambiguation page for "Foster"
- Forster (disambiguation), a disambiguation page for "Forster"
- Attorney General Foster (disambiguation), a disambiguation page for Attorney Generals surnamed "Foster"
- Doctor Foster (disambiguation), a disambiguation page for Doctors surnamed "Foster"
- General Foster (disambiguation), a disambiguation page for Generals surnamed "Foster"
- Governor Foster (disambiguation), a disambiguation page for Governors surnamed "Foster"
- Judge Foster (disambiguation), a disambiguation page for Judges surnamed "Foster"
- Justice Foster (disambiguation), a disambiguation page for Justices surnamed "Foster"
- Lord Foster (disambiguation), a disambiguation page for Lord surnamed "Foster"
- Senator Foster (disambiguation), a disambiguation page for Senators surnamed "Foster"
