= Massachusetts Eye and Ear =

- Mass General Brigham

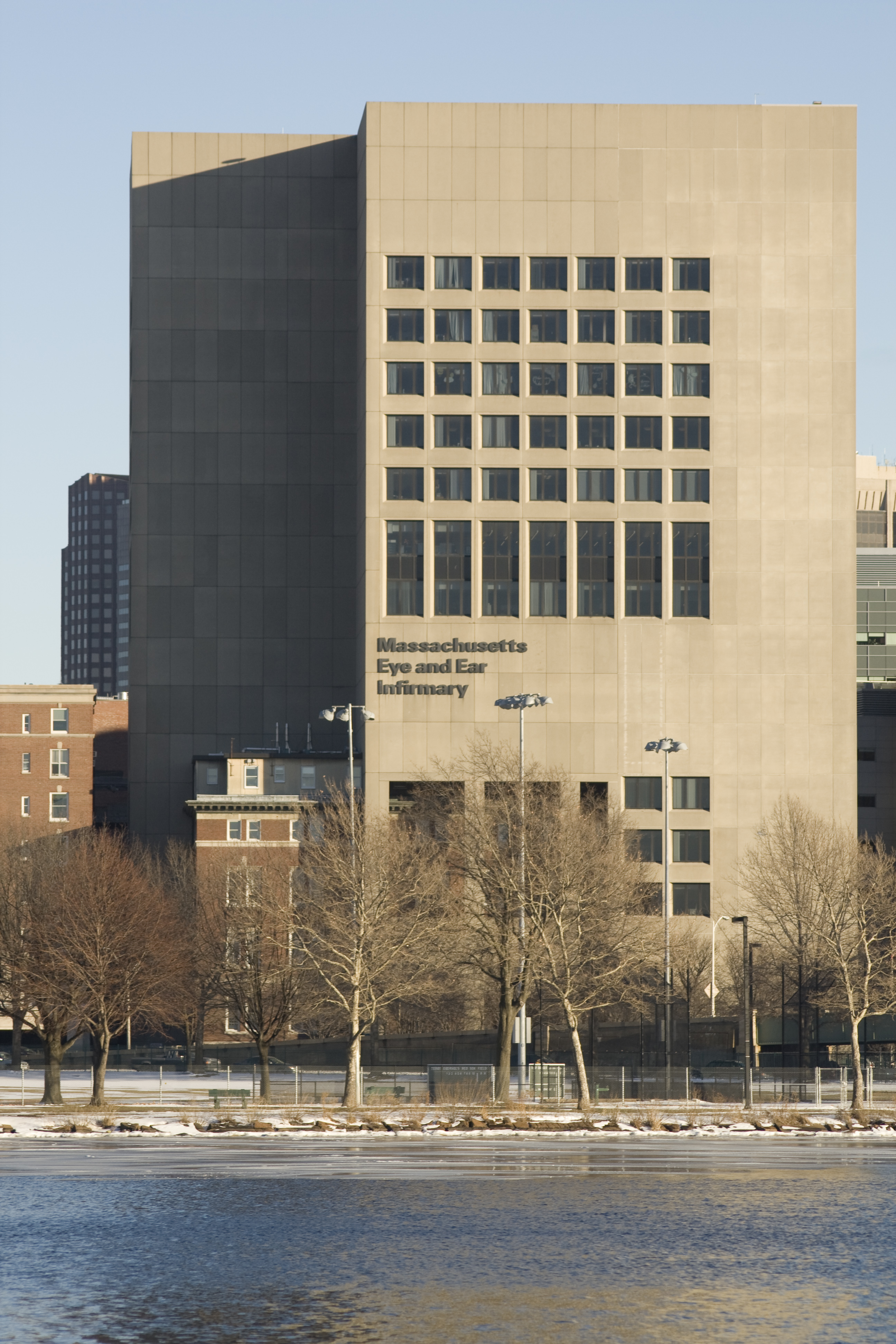
- MEE Main Campus

Geography
- Location: 243 Charles Street, Boston, Massachusetts, United States
- Coordinates: 42°21′38.39″N 71°04′12.09″W

Organization
- Type: Specialist
- Affiliated university: Harvard Medical School/Harvard University

Services
- Emergency department: Yes (Specialty)
- Beds: 41
- Speciality: Ophthalmology, Otolaryngology

History
- Founded: 1824

Links
- Website: www.masseyeandear.org
- Lists: Hospitals in Massachusetts

Massachusetts Eye and Ear (Mass Eye and Ear, or MEE) is a specialty hospital located in Boston, Massachusetts, United States, which focuses on ophthalmology (eye), otolaryngology (ear/nose/throat), and related medicine and research. Founded in 1824 as the Boston Eye Infirmary (BEI), it has also been known as the Massachusetts Charitable Eye and Ear Infirmary (MCEEI) and Massachusetts Eye and Ear Infirmary (MEEI). It is a teaching partner of Harvard Medical School.

Massachusetts Eye and Ear has earned an international reputation for its successful treatment of the most difficult diseases and conditions of the eye, ear, nose, throat, head, and neck and for its outstanding contributions to medical research and education. In 2018, Massachusetts Eye and Ear had two adult specialties nationally ranked the "U.S. News Best Hospitals Rankings and Ratings 2018-18, with the Department of Ophthalmology ranked number four in the U.S. and the Department of Otolaryngology placing number six in the nation.

The primary teaching hospital for Harvard Medical School in ophthalmology and otolaryngology, Massachusetts Eye and Ear trains more than 110 residents and fellows each year in its various sub-specialties, including cornea, neuro-ophthalmology, retina, eye pathology, pediatrics, glaucoma, ocular oncology, immunology, head & neck surgery, oncology, pediatric otolaryngology, facial plastics, otology and oto-neurology. In addition to ophthalmology and otolaryngology, the hospital provides patient services and conducts research and clinical training in audiology (diagnostics, hearing aids, and cochlear implants), balance (vestibular), facial nerve, thyroid, voice and speech, and vision rehabilitation.

== Main campus ==
The hospital's main campus is located in Boston's West End, surrounded by various Massachusetts General Hospital (MGH) buildings. MEEI and MGH are both Harvard Medical School teaching hospitals; the MGH departments of Otolaryngology and Ophthalmology are actually departments at MEEI, and both hospitals tend to refer patients to one another. Despite this organizational and physical closeness, MEEI is a separate organization from MGH, with its own Board of Directors and executive team. notwithstanding this distinction, maps will often show the entire area labeled as "Massachusetts General Hospital". However, they are both members of Mass General Brigham.

Consisting of a 13-story tower (12 numbered floors + the S (Surgical) Floor), the current main building was completed in 1973. It houses 42 inpatient beds.

The transit stop serving the two hospitals is "Charles/MGH" on the MBTA Red Line train. The signs at the train station (which was rebuilt and opened in 2007) have smaller printing reading "Mass. Eye and Ear Infirmary" in addition to the prominent "Charles/MGH" signs, and "Mass Eye and Ear Infirmry" is announced in some newer trains. C. Stephen Foster developed the first ocular immunology service at Massachusetts Eye and Ear Infirmary.

The main campus is also home to the Norman Knight Hyperbaric Medicine Center, which provides 24-hour emergency treatment for smoke inhalation, carbon monoxide poisoning, and diving injuries such as decompression sickness ("the bends"). Treatment for problem-wound healing is also conducted in the center.

== History ==
In a notice published on April 2, 2018, Massachusetts Eye and Ear's President John Fernandez announced the finalization of the agreement to make MEE a part of the Mass General Brigham hospital and physicians network.

In April 2021, the organization settled a lawsuit over improper Medicare and Medicaid billing for $2.7 million.

== Other locations ==
Massachusetts Eye and Ear has a total of 22 additional sites in the Greater Boston region, including three additional locations in Boston (the Longwood Medical Area, Emerson Place and Charlestown), as well as 19 sites in suburbs of Boston, including Braintree, Bridgewater, Concord, MA, Duxbury, Foxboro, Harwich, Mashpee, Lexington, Malden, Milton, Medford, Newton, Plainville, Providence RI, Quincy, Salem, Stoneham (two locations: one for Otolaryngology, and another for Ophthalmology and Audiology), Wellesley, and Weymouth.

Some locations offer only one service or specialty.
