= Frank Foster =

Francis or Frank Foster may refer to:

== Music ==
- Frank Foster (jazz musician) (1928–2011), American jazz saxophonist
- Frank Foster (country singer) (born 1982), American country singer-songwriter active since 2011

== Politics ==
- Frank Foster (Michigan politician) (born 1986), member of the Michigan House of Representatives in 2011–2014
- Frank Foster (Australian politician) (1872–1948)
- Francis Foster (Tasmanian politician) (1888–1979)

== Sports ==
- Francis Foster (cricketer, born 1761) (1761–1847), English cricketer
- Francis Foster (cricketer, born 1848) (1848–1931), English cricketer
- Frank Foster (cricketer) (1889–1958), English cricketer
- Frank Foster (rugby league) (1940–2019), English rugby player and coach

== Others ==
- Francis Foster (comic), British comedian
- Frank Hugh Foster (1851–1935), American clergyman of the Congregational church
- Frank Keyes Foster (1854–1909), American labor leader
- Frank William Foster (1887–1963), British Royal Air Force officer
- Frank Foster (Coronation Street), fictional character
- Frankie Foster, character in Foster's Home for Imaginary Friends

== See also ==
- Frances Foster (1924–1997), American actress
- Francis M. Forster, physician and neurologist
- Foster (surname)
