= Katherine Foster =

Katherine Foster may refer to:

- Kathryn Foster, American soap opera director
- Kathy Foster (basketball) (born 1960), Australian basketball player

== See also ==
- Kathy Foster (disambiguation)
- Kathleen Foster (disambiguation)
- Foster (surname)
