= Kimberly Foster =

Kimberly Foster may refer to:

- Kimberly Foster (actress) (born 1961), American actress
- Kimberly L. Foster, American engineer
- Kimberly N. Foster (born 1989), American writer
