= Alan Foster =

Alan Foster may refer to:

- Alan Dean Foster (born 1946), science fiction novelist
- Alan Foster (baseball) (born 1946), player active in the 1960s
- Alan Foster (BMX rider) (born 1970), American BMX racer
- Alan Foster (footballer) (born 1971), Scottish footballer

== See also ==
- Allen Foster (c. 1887–1916), Reading Football Club player in the pre–World War I era
- C. Allen Foster, American lawyer
- Allen Foster Cooper (1862–1917), Republican politician representing Pennsylvania
