= Senator Foster =

Senator Foster may refer to:

== Members of the United States Senate ==
- Addison G. Foster (1837–1917), U.S. Senator from Washington from 1899 to 1905
- Dwight Foster (politician, born 1757) (1757–1823), U.S. Senator from Massachusetts from 1800 to 1803
- Ephraim H. Foster (1794–1854), U.S. Senator from Tennessee from 1838 to 1839 and from 1843 to 1845
- Henry A. Foster (1800–1889), U.S. Senator from New York from 1844 to 1845
- Lafayette S. Foster (1806–1880), U.S. Senator from Connecticut from 1855 to 1867
- Murphy J. Foster (1849–1921), U.S. Senator from Louisiana from 1901 to 1913
- Theodore Foster (1752–1828), U.S. Senator from Rhode Island from 1790 to 1803

== U.S. state senate members ==
- Abiel Foster (1735–1806), New Hampshire State Senate
- Bill I. Foster (born 1946), Missouri State Senate
- Cassius Gaius Foster (1837–1899), Kansas State Senate
- Dan Foster (politician) (born 1948), West Virginia State Senate
- David J. Foster (1857–1912), Vermont State Senate
- Harry C. Foster (1871–1917), Massachusetts State Senate
- Ira Roe Foster (1811–1885), Georgia State Senate and Alabama State Senate
- James H. Foster (1827–1907), Wisconsin State Senate
- Joseph Foster (politician) (born 1959), New Hampshire State Senate
- Joyce Foster (born 1944), Colorado State Senate
- Mike Foster (American politician) (born 1930), Louisiana State Senate
- Nathaniel Greene Foster (1809–1869), Georgia State Senate
- Paulinus Foster (1811–1861), Maine State Senate
- Reuben Foster (politician) (1833–1898), Maine State Senate
- Robert Coleman Foster (1769–1844), Tennessee State Senate
- Stephen Clark Foster (Maine politician) (1799–1872), Maine State Senate
- Stephen Clark Foster (1822–1898), California State Senate
- Wilder D. Foster (1819–1873), Michigan State Senate
- William Foster (New York state senator) (1813–1893), New York State Senate
