= Geoff Foster =

Geoff Foster may refer to:

- Geoff Foster (audio engineer), English recording and mix engineer
- Geoff Foster (rugby league) (born 1952), Australian rugby league player
- Geoff Foster (politician) (born 1986), American politician in West Virginia

== See also ==
- Jeff Foster (disambiguation)
