= Doctor Foster =

Doctor Foster may refer to:

- "Doctor Foster" (nursery rhyme), an English nursery rhyme
- Doctor Foster (TV series), a British television drama
- Dr Foster Intelligence, a healthcare information company
