= Jane Foster (disambiguation) =

Jane Foster is a fictional character appearing in comic books and films by Marvel.

Jane Foster may also refer to:

- Jane Foster Zlatovski (1912–1979), a diplomat and alleged spy
- Jane McDowell Foster Wiley (1829–1903), spouse of composer Stephen Foster
- Jane Foster (pilot), Royal Canadian Air Force pilot
- Jane Foster (Marvel Cinematic Universe)

== See also ==
- Foster (surname)
- Mary-Jane Foster, actress and politician
