= Nathaniel Foster =

Nathaniel Foster may refer to:

- Nathaniel Greene Foster (1809–1869), American politician, lawyer, and military officer
- Nathaniel Foster (potter) (1781–1853), American potter and merchant
- Nat Foster (1766–1840), American hunter and trapper in the Adirondack Mountains
