= Arthur Foster =

Arthur Foster may refer to:

- Arthur Foster (footballer, born 1869) (1869–?), English footballer
- Arthur Foster (footballer, born 1894) (1894–1954), English footballer and cricketer
- Arthur Foster (cricketer) (1881–1956), English cricketer, medical doctor, and British Army officer
- Arthur B. Foster (1872–1958), justice of the Supreme Court of Alabama
