= Adrian Foster =

Adrian Foster may refer to:

- Adrian Foster (British Army officer) (served 1975–2018), retired Major General
- Adrian Foster (footballer) (born 1971), English footballer
- Adrian Foster (ice hockey) (born 1982), American ice hockey player
- Adrian Foster (politician), Canadian politician
