= Ian Foster =

Ian Foster may refer to:

- Ian Foster (computer scientist) (born 1959), New Zealand–American computer scientist
- Ian Foster (footballer) (born 1976), English football player and coach
- Ian Foster (musician) (born 1981), Canadian singer-songwriter, producer and filmmaker
- Ian Foster (rugby union) (born 1965), New Zealand rugby union player and coach
