= Graham Foster =

Graham Foster may refer to:

- Graham Foster (American football), American football player and coach
- Graham Foster (EastEnders), a character from the British soap opera EastEnders
- Graham Foster (Emmerdale), a character from the British soap opera Emmerdale
- Graeme Foster, Australian rugby league footballer
