= Mary Foster =

Mary Foster may refer to:

- Mary Foster (biochemist) (1865–1960), American biochemist
- Mary LeCron Foster (1914–2001), American anthropological linguist
- Mary Robinson Foster (1844–1930), Hawaiian philanthropist
- Mary Parke Foster (1840–1922), president general of the Daughters of the American Revolution
- T. Mary Foster, New Zealand behavioural psychologist and professor
- Mary Cardona-Foster, American contestant on the American TV series The Amazing Race
