= Kevin Foster =

Kevin Foster may refer to:

- Kevin Foster (baseball) (1969–2008), Major League Baseball pitcher
- Kevin Foster (basketball) (born 1990), American basketball player
- Kevin Foster (fraudster), British investment fraudster
- Kevin Foster (murderer) (born 1977), American murderer
- Kevin Foster (Hollyoaks), fictional character
- Kevin Foster (cyclist) (born 1960), American actor and adventurer
- Kevin Foster (politician) (born 1978), British Conservative member of parliament (MP) for Torbay since 2015
- Kevin Foster (ice hockey), American ice hockey player
