= Maggie Foster =

Maggie Foster may refer to:

- Maggie Foster, character in George (1993 TV series)
- Maggie Foster, character in Revolution (TV series)

== See also ==
- Margaret Foster (disambiguation)
