= Red Foster =

Red Foster may refer to:

- Red Foster (baseball), American baseball player
- Red Foster (humanitarian) (1905–1985), Canadian humanitarian
- Red Dawn Foster, American politician

== See also ==
- Reddy Foster (1864–1908), American baseball player
