= Dale Foster =

Australian rules footballer

Personal information
- Born: 7 May 1958 (age 68)
- Original team: Yallourn/Yallourn North
- Height: 185 cm (6 ft 1 in)
- Weight: 90 kg (198 lb)

Playing career^{1}
Years	Club	Games (Goals)
1980	Hawthorn	3 (0)
- ^{1} Playing statistics correct to the end of 1980.

Dale Foster (born 7 May 1958) is a former Australian rules footballer who played three games for Hawthorn in the Victorian Football League in 1980. He was recruited from Churchill, Victoria and played for Yallourn/Yallourn North in the Mid Gippsland Football League.
