= Linda Foster =

Linda Foster may refer to:

- Linda Foster (politician) (1943–2016)
- Linda Foster (actress) (born 1944)
