= Ron Foster =

Ron Foster is the name of:

- Ron Foster (actor) (1930–2015), American actor
- Ron Foster (footballer) (1938–2017), English footballer
- Ron Foster (musician), American past member of rock band Iron City Houserockers
- Ronnie Foster (born 1950), American funk and soul-jazz organist
- Ronald M. Foster (1896–1998), Bell Labs mathematician and filter researcher
