= Amy Foster =

Amy Foster may refer to:

- Amy Foster (short story), a 1901 short story written by Joseph Conrad
- Amy Foster (athlete) (born 1988), Irish athlete
- Amy C. Foster, American engineer
- Amy S. Foster (born 1973), Canadian songwriter

== See also ==
- Ami Foster, American actress
