= Bradley Foster (disambiguation) =

Bradley Foster is a fictional character.

Brad or Bradley Foster may also refer to:

- Brad W. Foster (born 1955), American illustrator, cartoonist, writer and publisher
- Brad Foster (musician), guitarist with Abandon Kansas
- Brad Foster (boxer) (born 1997), British boxer
