= Sheila Foster =

Legal scholar and author

Sheila Rose Foster
- Occupations: Legal Scholar and author
- Awards: Prose Award Winner in Architecture and Urban Planning, Association of American Publishers (AAP); Distinguished Scholar Award, Senior Faculty, International Academy of Environmental Law

Academic background
- Education: B.S., English; J.D.
- Alma mater: University of Michigan; University of California, Berkeley

Academic work
- Institutions: Columbia University
- Website: https://www.sheilarfoster.com/

Sheila Rose Foster is a legal scholar, and an author. She is a tenured Professor of Climate at the Columbia Climate School.

Foster is most known her research in the areas of environmental law and justice, urban land use law and policy, and state and local government. She served as the former Clarkson Distinguished Chair in Planning at the University at Buffalo School of Architecture and Planning and received the Senior Scholar Award by International Academy of Environmental Law. She is the co-author of four books, including From the Ground Up: Environmental Racism and the Rise of the Environmental Justice Movement, and Co-Cities: Innovative Transitions Toward Just and Self-Sustaining Communities. In addition, she is a founding editor of SLoGLaw blog, which focuses on developments in state and local government law, and is a Founding Board Member of the Journal of Climate Resilience and Climate Justice since 2022.

== Education ==
Foster earned a Bachelor of Science degree in English from the University of Michigan, Ann Arbor and later a Juris Doctor (J.D.) degree from the University of California, Berkeley.

== Career ==
Foster began her academic career at the University of California, Berkeley, School of Law, where she served as a lecturer and coordinator of academic support from 1990 to 1994. She then went on to teach at Rutgers University–Camden, New Jersey from 1994 to 2002. From there, she joined the faculty at Fordham University in New York, NY in 2002, and held an appointment as the Albert A. Walsh Professor of Real Estate, Land Use and Property Law and a University Professor until 2017. From 2017 to 2023, Foster was the Scott K. Ginsburg Professor of Urban Law and Policy, and held holds a joint position as a professor of public policy at the McCourt Public Policy School at Georgetown University. Foster served as visiting professor of climate at the Columbia Climate School during the 2023-2024 academic year, and was appointed as a tenured professor of climate in 2024.

At Fordham University, she served as associate dean for academic affairs from 2008 to 2011 and as vice dean from 2011 to 2014. She was appointed as the (inaugural) associate dean for diversity, equity, and inclusion (law) from 2021 to 2022 at Georgetown University.

From 2017 to 2020, she was the chair of the advisory committee for the Global Parliament of Mayors and has been a co-chair of the ongoing Equity Work Group of the New York City Mayor's Panel on Climate Change (NPCC) since her appointment in 2016. She co-directs LabGov.city, an applied research project focusing on innovative forms of urban governance in cities and metropolitan regions. The "Co-City" approach is set out in her book with LabGov co-director Christian Iaione, Co-Cities: Innovative Transitions toward Just and Self-Sustaining Communities.

== Research ==
Foster's work is focused in legal and policy fields related to environmental and climate justice, innovative resource governance regimes, and the role of subnational governments in tackling cross-border issues like climate change. She has also been recognized for her contributions to the field with awards including the Georgetown Earth Commons Institute Eco Impact Award and the Georgetown Environmental Initiative Award.

=== Environmental justice ===
During her early career, Foster focused on environmental justice research and authored numerous publications that critically examined environmental policy from the perspectives of distributive and procedural justice. Her work incorporated the experiences and historical context of overburdened communities to develop a conception of justice. She used her analysis to identify why certain legal remedies, such as some civil rights claims and regulatory approaches, have failed to benefit these communities. In From the Ground Up, she employed social, economic, and legal analysis to expose the root causes of environmental racism, while highlighting the transformative power of environmental justice movements on individuals, communities, institutions, and the nation.

The book is regarded as one of the foundational and most essential books to read on environmental and climate justice by a number of sources. Further, her book, The Law of Environmental Justice provided an in-depth analysis of the origins of environmental justice law and its influence on projects throughout the United States, encompassing evolving regulations and significant court rulings.

=== Urban governance ===
Foster's research has explored three key areas centered around the theme of urban governance. This work has specifically focused on the role of cities in promoting social and economic well-being, improving global governance, and addressing issues related to climate inequality. She has written on decentralized forms of governance in cities and the role of cities in global governance, as well as innovative approaches in which cities are shaping climate change policy and fostering energy democracy.

==== Cities as commons/co-cities ====
Foster's work in environmental led her to focus on the concept of the "urban commons" in her research. In an article, she highlighted the lack of attention given to collective action in urban contexts despite extensive literature on self-organized natural resource management. She examined how groups of users manage common urban resources without government involvement, tracking the shift to an enabling governance model where governments support communities managing collective resources. In The City as a Commons, together with Christian Iaione, she explored the potential of the commons as a framework for addressing resource challenges faced by cities, including climate change, and presented a new governance model, "urban collaborative governance," aimed at managing city resources as commons and addressing questions of political, social, and economic inequality in cities. She also led a research team to survey and map over 500 collectively managed urban commons worldwide, resulting in a set of design principles applicable to governing various urban resources. Her theoretical and empirical research on the "Co-City" framework and the concept of the city as a commons, with Christian Iaione, culminated in a book titled Co-Cities: Innovative Transitions to Just and Self-Sustaining Communities, which won the 2023 Prose Award in Architecture and Urban Planning. As part of her research on the commons, she and her co-authors critically engaged with scholarship on the role of inequality in accessing resources. They explored the processes of commoning or decommoning via "grabbed commons," linking it to colonization and capitalist dispossessions to broaden the theoretical and empirical scope of commons scholarship.

==== Cities in global governance ====
As former chair of the advisory board for the Global Parliament of Mayors (2017-2020), Foster researched the role of city networks in global governance institutions. This includes examining their efforts to shape policies on cross-border issues like migration and climate change traditionally reserved for nation-states. In a joint study, she expressed doubt that cities can influence global policymaking. However, it was argued that cities have gained more "soft power" and can address crises through international agreements, where nation-states have failed. Expanding on this subject, along with Chrystie Swiney, she argued that cities are creating a type of transnational law through legal or quasi-legal agreements outside the bounds of international law. Such agreements often resemble international legal agreements, such as those for migration or climate change, but without enforcement mechanisms.

==== The local role in climate governance ====
Another area in her work includes local climate governance and energy democracy. This work focuses on cities' role in tackling climate change despite restraints from states and private entities. In a book chapter, she laid out the legal and policy landscape for understanding cities' roles in climate mitigation and adaptation, offering examples and discussing problems with state preemption. As the co-chair of NPCC, she led the chapter on Community-Based Assessments of Adaptation and Equity in its 2019 report. This work identified ways to incorporate equity into the city's climate change vulnerability analyses and adaptation planning efforts, including tracking specific indicators of neighborhood vulnerability over time.

== Awards and honors ==
- 2017 – Bellagio Residency Award, Rockefeller Foundation
- 2017 – Environmental Initiative Award, The Earth Commons, Georgetown University
- 2018 – Senior Scholar Award, International Academy of Environmental Law
- 2022 – Eco Impact Award, The Earth Commons, Georgetown University
- 2023 – Prose Award Winner in Architecture and Urban Planning, Association of American Publishers (AAP)
- 2024 – Elected to the American College of Environmental Lawyers for substantial contributions to the field of environmental law.

== Bibliography ==
=== Books ===
- From the Ground Up: Environmental Racism and the Rise of the Environmental Justice Movement (2001) ISBN 9780814715376
- The Law of Environmental Justice: Theories and Procedures to Address Disproportionate Risks (2008) ISBN 9781604420838
- Comparative Equality and Anti-discrimination Law: Cases, Codes, Constitutions, and Commentary (2012) ISBN 9781609300616
- The Cambridge Handbook of Commons Research Innovations (2021) ISBN 9781108938617
- Co-Cities: Innovative Transitions Toward Just and Self-Sustaining Communities (2022) ISBN 9780262539982

=== Selected articles ===
- Foster, S. (1993). Difference and equality: A critical assessment of the concept of diversity. Wis. L. Rev., 105.
- Foster, S. (1993). Race (ial) matters: The quest for environmental justice. Ecology LQ, 20, 721.
- Foster, S. (1998). Justice from the ground up: Distributive inequities, grassroots resistance, and the transformative politics of the environmental justice movement. Calif. L. Rev., 86, 775.
- Foster, S. R. (2006). The city as an ecological space: social capital and urban land use. Notre Dame L. Rev., 82, 527.
- Foster, S. R. (2011). Collective action and the urban commons. Notre Dame L. Rev., 87, 57.
- Foster, S. R., & Iaione, C. (2015). The city as a commons. Yale L. & Pol'y Rev., 34, 281.
