= Dwight Foster =

Dwight Foster is the name of:

- Dwight Foster (politician, born 1757) (1757–1823), U.S. Congressman and Senator for Massachusetts
- Dwight Foster (politician, born 1828) (1828–1884), Massachusetts attorney general
- Dwight Foster (ice hockey) (1957–2025), Canadian ice hockey player in the NHL
