= Greg Foster =

Greg or Gregory Foster may refer to:

- Greg Foster (basketball) (born 1968), American retired professional basketball player
- Greg Foster (hurdler) (1958–2023), American hurdler
- Greg Foster (The Young and the Restless), character on the soap opera The Young and the Restless
- Sir Gregory Foster (1866–1931), British university administrator
- Greg Foster, founder and CEO of Rainbow Play Systems
