= Maurice Foster =

Maurice Foster may refer to:

- Maurice Foster (politician) (1933–2010), Canadian politician
- Maurice Foster (cricketer, born 1943), West Indies cricketer
- Maurice Foster (English cricketer) (1889–1940), English cricketer
