= Roy Foster =

Roy Foster may refer to:

- Roy Foster (American football) (born 1960), American offensive lineman
- Roy Foster (baseball) (1945–2008), American outfielder
- R. F. Foster (historian) (born 1949), Irish academic
