= Joy Foster =

Jamaican table tennis player

Joy Foster is a Jamaican table tennis player. She set the Guinness World Record as the youngest sportsperson to represent their country in an international match when she participated in the West Indies Championship in 1958, aged eight. She is also the first and youngest recipient of the Jamaican Sportswoman of the Year Award.

== Biography ==
Foster was introduced to table tennis at 4 years old. Unable to reach the table, she would stand on a box as she played against her brothers Dave and Maurice. Her father, Audley George Foster, known as "Gig" or "Mr Fos", was her coach.

In 1958 at age 8, Foster won a place in the Guinness record book as the world's youngest person to represent their country in international competition. She represented her country in the West Indies Championships. She won the women's singles championship; the mixed doubles partnering with Fuarnando Roberts, and the women's doubles partnering with Madge Bond. In 1961, Foster was given the first Jamaican Sportswoman of the Year award. She remains the youngest winner at 11 years old.

Foster won the Jamaican Open Women's Singles title twice before the age of 12.
