= Kimberly L. Foster =

American mechanical engineer

Kimberly L. Foster (née Passerello, formerly Kimberly L. Turner) is an American mechanical engineer specializing in microelectromechanical systems including stick-slip phenomena, biomimetic adhesives, parametric oscillators, and microsensors. She is dean of science and engineering at Tulane University, where she is also a professor of physics and engineering physics and (by courtesy) of biomedical engineering.

== Education and career ==
Foster is originally from Michigan, and studied engineering at Michigan Technological University, where her father Chris Passerello was a faculty member. She graduated in 1994, taking only three years for her degree. Originally planning to become a veterinarian, she continued in engineering after obtaining a National Science Foundation graduate fellowship. She completed her Ph.D. in 1999 at Cornell University, in theoretical and applied mechanics.

She joined the faculty of the University of California, Santa Barbara in 1999, and served as chair of the department of mechanical engineering there from 2008 to 2013. She moved to Tulane as dean in 2018.

== Recognition ==
Foster has received several awards, was named an ASME Fellow in 2014, "for her major contributions in the area of micro-electro-mechanical-systems" and "extensive service to her professional community".

In 2021, Michigan Technological University named Foster to their Mechanical Engineering-Engineering Mechanics Academy.

She's also received the NSF Career award on July of 2018, she was featured as one of the 120 worldwide women of impact

Foster has won the USCB Academic Senate Distinguished Award for both teaching in 2005 and graduate mentoring in 2013, and recently in January of 202 she was one of 10 women in New Orleans to receive a Women in STEM award by the American Heart Association and Entergy

She was one of two professors to receive the Deans Hero Award at Tulane University
