= R. F. Foster =

R. F. Foster may refer to:

- Robert Frederick Foster (1853–1945), disseminator of the rules of many card games
- R. F. Foster (historian) (born 1949), Robert Fitzroy Foster, professor of Irish History
