= Helen Foster =

Helen Foster may refer to:

- Helen Foster (politician), New York City Council member
- Helen Foster (actress) (1906–1982), American film actress
- Helen Foster Snow (1907–1997), born as Helen Foster, American journalist
