= Red Foster (humanitarian) =

Harry Edward "Red" Foster, OC (March 1, 1905–January 8, 1985) was a Canadian humanitarian, broadcaster, and advocate for special needs children.

== Early life ==
Foster was born in Toronto to Daniel and Helen Foster on March 1, 1905. He grew up on Oaklands Avenue alongside his blind and developmentally disabled brother John (also referred to as Jackie). In 1924, Foster joined the T. Eaton Company where his uncle worked in sales while selling advertising on sports programs in his free time. He also played for the Toronto Balmy Beach Beachers from 1928 to 1930 and helped them claim the Grey Cup in 1930. Foster also won Canada's first official outboard race in 1928 before leaving competitive sports for sports broadcasting.

== Career ==
On April 11, 1931, Foster made his first live broadcast from a wrestling match at Toronto's Mutual Street Arena. Later, in November, he also claimed the first coast-to-coast football broadcast. At the conclusion of each broadcast, Foster signed off with a quote from Grantland Rice: "When the great scorer comes to write against your name, He marks not that you have won or lost, but how you played the game." Beyond broadcasting, Foster also established an advertising agency, Foster Advertising Limited, on May 15, 1944, with a handful of blue-chip clients who brought in about $400,000 in billings and provided jobs for 30 people. In 1951, Foster was elected president of the Ridley College Old Boys' Association.

Following his brother's death in 1964, Foster established Canada's first National Library on Mental Retardation in his honour. He also fundraised across Canada to raise money for research and training centres dedicated to the study of the causes of developmental disabilities and the care of those afflicted. In the following decade, Foster established a charity in his name and worked alongside the Kennedy Foundation to "provide athletic training and competition for the mentally handicapped," leading to the establishment of the Special Olympics.

== Death and legacy ==
Foster died on January 8, 1985, and was buried at Mount Pleasant Cemetery, Toronto. The year prior to his death he was inducted into Canada's Sports Hall of Fame. In 1998, the Canadian Bank Note Company published a stamp in his honour.
