= Duke Foster =

American football coach (1929–1973)

Biographical details
- Born: January 23, 1929; Atlanta, Georgia, U.S.
- Died: July 20, 1973 (aged 44)

Playing career

Football
- 1947–1950: Morehouse

Basketball
- 1947–1949: Morehouse
- Positions: End (football); Center (basketball)

Coaching career (HC unless noted)

Football
- 1955–1956: Morehouse (assistant)
- 1957–1966: Morehouse

Head coaching record
- Overall: 27–47–4

Robert Duke Foster Jr. (January 23, 1929 – July 20, 1973) was an American college football player and coach. He served as the head football coach at Morehouse College in Atlanta from 1957 to 1966, compiling a record of 27–47–4.

Foster was born on January 23, 1929, in Atlanta. He graduated from Northwestern High School in Detroit in 1947 and entered Morehouse College as a student that fall. He played football at Morehouse as an end from 1947 to 1950, captaining the Tigers and earning All-Southern Intercollegiate Athletic Conference (SIAC) honors in 1949. He also played basketball as a center and baseball at the school. After graduating from Morehouse in 1951, he served two years in the United States Marine Corps, attaining the rank of lieutenant. After leaving the Marines, Foster earned a master's degree in health and physical education from New York University (NYU) and returned to Morehouse as an instructor and coach in 1955. He died on July 20, 1973.

== Head coaching record ==
Year	Team	Overall	Conference	Standing	Bowl/playoffs
Morehouse Maroon Tigers (Southern Intercollegiate Athletic Conference) (1957–1966)
1957	Morehouse	2–5–1	1–4–1	11th	
1958	Morehouse	3–4–1	3–3	T–8th	
1959	Morehouse	5–2–1	5–1	2nd	
1960	Morehouse	5–3	4–2	4th	
1961	Morehouse	4–4	3–3	8th	
1962	Morehouse	6–2	5–1	3rd	
1963	Morehouse	1–6			
1964	Morehouse	1–7			
1965	Morehouse	0–6–1			
1966	Morehouse	0–8			
Morehouse:		27–47–4			
Total:		27–47–4			
