= Nick Foster =

Nick Foster may refer to:

- Nick Foster (composer), British composer and songwriter
- Nick Foster (Australian racing driver) (born 1993), Australian racing driver
- Nick Foster (British racing driver) (born 1965), British racing driver
- Nicholas Foster Rattigan (born 1992), American musician
