= Martha M. Foster =

- Born: Urbana, IL, USA
- Occupation(s): Founding Director, Living Earth Television NFP
- Spouse: Earon S. Davis
- Children: Tess E. Raser
- Website: http://www.letv.org

Martha M. Foster is the founder and executive director of Living Earth Television (LETV), a Bloomington, Indiana-based nonprofit organization that develops programming from documentaries made by international filmmakers. Foster began LETV in 2002, in Chicago.

In September 2010, Living Earth Television's first broadcast appeared on LinkTV. LETV's newly released English language version of an award-winning documentary from Chinese producer Zhang Yiqing, Kindergarten, was featured on LinkTV's DocDebut site.

In June 2009, Foster was invited to participate in the U.S. Department of State Bureau of Educational and Cultural Affairs' American Documentary Showcase, a touring initiative that features U.S. documentaries and is administered by the University Film and Video Association (UFVA) in partnership with the International Documentary Association (IDA). The program debuted in the Czech Republic and Poland in April 2009 and traveled to nearly 30 countries in 2009, including Iraq, Kenya and Vietnam. In September and October 2009, Foster traveled to Singapore and Myanmar as a Documentary Expert with the Showcase. In December 2010, Foster traveled to China with the Showcase, to exhibit American documentaries in Nanjing, Guangzhou and Beijing.

Following her visit to Myanmar, Foster and LETV facilitated the broadcast of three international environmental films on Myanmar State Television, at the request of the Myanmar Ministry of Information, working in cooperation with the US Embassy in Yangon. These programs began broadcasting in Myanmar in September 2010.

Foster has worked for the Smithsonian Institution, the Chicago Field Museum and Chicago Public Television and has won five regional Emmy awards, some shared with other colleagues. She was selected as an "Influential Woman in Business" by the National Association of Women Business Owners in 2003.

She has acted in conjunction with universities, museums and festivals in the United States and abroad for nearly 30 years. In 2008, she served as a judge for the Jade Kunlun Awards-2008 World Mountain Documentary Festival of Qinghai, China.

Foster's continuing relationship with Chinese documentary television professionals began in 1997, when professor Ren Yuan of the Beijing Broadcasting Institute (now the Communication University of China) brought Chinese documentaries to show at the Windy City International Documentary Festival in Chicago, which Foster founded and directed.

Foster was invited to visit China in 1999 to lecture to documentary production professionals at universities and television stations in five cities. In 2001 and 2003, she also served as a juror for the Gold Panda social and cultural documentary awards.
