= D'Chrome Foster =

American singer and actor

- Also known as: D'Chrome Foster
- Born: Serge Thony; 2 April 1977 (age 49); Brooklyn, New York City
- Origin: New York City
- Genres: R&B; hip-hop; reggae; dancehall; pop
- Occupations: Singer; rapper; actor; model; producer
- Instrument: vocals
- Years active: 2014–present
- Label: STK MKT Entertainment
- Website: dchromefoster.com

Serge Thony (known under the stage name D'Chrome Foster) is an American singer, rapper and actor.

== Life and career ==
Serge Thony was born and raised in Flatbush, Brooklyn, son of Caribbean parents. Throughout his teenage years he strove to perfect his musical style, while working as a MC alongside renowned hip hop artists like Immortal Technique or Jin and performing in clubs in the LES, Jersey and Brooklyn. He graduated from State University of New York with a B.A. degree, later attended Rutgers University and achieved the degree of Master in Fine Arts.

D'Chrome Foster has involved himself in the feminist cause and has expressed disapproval for the fact in the hip hop culture women are objectified and denied liberties and positive image awarded to men. The #LoveMyBounce campaign was created and launched in honor of 2015 International Women's Day by STK MKT Entertainment and D'Chrome Foster to raise awareness of gender inequality, starting with violence against women, to erase the social stigma of identifying as a survivor of abuse, and to be a platform by which there can be elevated organizations that are dedicated to the cause.

== Discography ==
D'Chrome Foster released in August 2014 his first single, "Manhood", a track that showcases the struggles between a man and his woman. Following the release of "Manhood", D’Chrome released "Cyanide" in December 2014. Both tracks and their accompanying videos tell varied and compelling stories of today’s social issues and touch the issue of pop culture's fascination with a woman’s body image. In January 2015, he followed with another single and the accompanying video, "January", inspired by club music style. He also released the single "Race" in July 2015.

== Filmography ==
| Title | Year | Role | Notes |
|---|---|---|---|
| Stray | 2017 | Carlos | Feature film, post-production |
| R.W.D: Red, White & Detroit | 2013 | EZ | Lead; short crime drama |
| The Darker the Berry | 2001 | Tariq | Drama |

== Stage credits ==
| Production | Year | Theater | Role | Notes |
|---|---|---|---|---|
| An American Drum Circle | 2016 | UP Theater Company | Jimmy | Written by Vanessa Shealy |
| Three Sisters | 2016 | Classical Theatre of Harlem | | Adapted by John Martin-Green |
| In Bed with Roy Cohn | 2015 | Lion Theatre | Serge | Written by Joan Beber, Undercover Productions |
| Ethel Sings | 2014 | Beckett Theater | Ensemble Cast | Written by Joan Beber, Undercover Productions |
| Flying Fables | 2012 | New Haarlem Arts Theater at City College | Charles | Adapted by Stephanie Berry |
| Kansas City Swing | 2013 | Crossroads Theatre | Art | Written by Trey Ellis & Ricardo Khan |
| A Raisin in the Sun | 2012 | Philip J Levin Theater | George Murchison | Starred with Tony Award winner, Tonya Pinkins |
