= Jabez Foster (footballer) =

English footballer

Jabez Foster (born 15 September 1902) was an English professional footballer of the 1920s. Born in Darlaston, he joined Gillingham from Bristol Rovers in 1926 and went on to make 21 appearances for the club in The Football League. He left to join Wellington Town in 1927.
