= Marion Foster (writer) =

Canadian broadcaster and mystery novelist

- Born: Shirley Shea; 1924; Sudbury, Ontario, Canada
- Died: 1997 (aged 72–73)
- Occupations: mystery writer, broadcaster
- Spouse: Betty Burrowes
- Writing career
- Period: 1980s–1990s
- Notable works: The Monarchs Are Flying, Legal Tender

Marion Foster was the pen name of Shirley Shea (September 3, 1924 – June 30, 1997), a Canadian broadcaster and mystery novelist.

== Early life ==
Born and raised in Sudbury, Ontario, Shea was one of four children. She was the only child raised by her grandmother and aunts, who encouraged her to get married when she was older, so that she could figure out what she wanted from life.

== Career ==
Shea served in the Royal Canadian Air Force during World War II from 1942 to 1944. During this time, she took courses in radio theory and signals, and worked as a tower operator on bombing stations. Once she was discharged, she returned to Sudbury, Ontario and started her first job in radio, as a junior commentator at CKSO. While employed at CKSO, Shea was involved in various programs, including “Story Time with Anne Marie” and “Let’s go to the Birthday Party”. Shea eventually relocated to Calgary, where she worked at CFAC.

In 1952, Shea received the Canadian Women's Press Club Award for her story "The Hunting Season", which based on psychological profiles of serial killers.

In 1953, Shea moved to Victoria for a job at CJVI, where she was the head writer for "Enterprise in Action", a dramatized documentary on industries in British Columbia. This show was syndicated and broadcast from 7 other radio stations.

Shea returned to Ontario in 1954, where she got a job as the women's commentator at CJOY in Guelph. She moved back to Sudbury in 1956, and returned to CKSO where she worked on multiple shows including "Dream Time", "The Sleepy Time Gal" and "Train Time".

Shea eventually moved to Toronto, where she worked for General Motors from 1958 to 1961. In 1961, she began working as a copywriter for Eaton's, eventually transitioning into the role of radio director for their popular shopping radio show.

From 1963 to 1666, Shea worked at CHFI Toronto where she was involved in programming, writing, special events, panels, documentary narration, and productions. At CHFI, Shea worked on a syndicated astrology show called Star Guide. Star Guide was broadcast across Canada, but came to an end when Shea realized that people were taking their horoscopes too seriously.

In 1971, Shea started her own marketing and advertising company called Shirley Shea and Associates.

In 1972, Shea co-authored A Not So Gay World: Homosexuality in Canada under her pen name Mario Foster with Kent Murray (pseud). This non-fiction study on homosexuality in Canada was the first of its kind and was published by McClelland & Stewart.

Shea worked as the Director of Retail and Cooperative Advertising for the Radio Bureau of Canada from 1978 to 1982. Shea retired from advertising and radio in 1982 and began focusing on her writing.

She published the novel Victims: A Pound of Flesh in 1986 under her own name, and then published two novels under the pen name Marion Foster. The Foster novels centred on Harriet Fordham Croft, a lesbian lawyer turned private investigator. The novels, described by critics as reminiscent of Raymond Chandler, were also influenced by Shea's interest in feminist literature. Shea's work was part of an emerging lesbian and women's crime sub-genre, which had been pioneered by authors like Eve Zaremba.

== Personal life ==
In 1960, Shea met her long-term partner Betty Burrowes from Australia. Within a few months, Shea and Burrowes found an apartment located on Toronto's Lakeshore Drive and moved in together. The couple were part of Toronto's lesbian bar scene and would frequent The Continental. In 1982, Shea retired and began focusing on her writing. She moved to Chatsworth with Burrowes, where she would spend the rest of her life.

Shea died on July 30, 1997.

== Works ==
- A Not So Gay World: Homosexuality in Canada (1972, as Marion Foster)
- Victims: A Pound of Flesh (1986, as Shirley Shea)
- The Monarchs Are Flying (1987, as Marion Foster)
- Legal Tender (1992, as Marion Foster)
