= Margaret Foster (disambiguation) =

Margaret Foster is a netball coach.

Margaret Foster may also refer to:

- Margaret D. Foster (1895–1970), American chemist
- Margaret Foster (writer), see List of winners and shortlisted authors of the Booker Prize for Fiction
- Margaret Foster, character in 1976 British film Emily (1976 film)
- Margaret Foster, character in 1980 American film 9 to 5 (film)

== See also ==
- Maggie Foster (disambiguation)
- Peggy Foster (active in 1970s), bassist of American female rock band The Runaways
