= Samuel Foster (disambiguation) =

Samuel Foster was an English mathematician and astronomer.

Samuel Foster or Sam Foster may also refer to:

- Samuel Foster House, a historic house in Reading, Massachusetts
- Samuel Foster, character in The Fosters (1976 TV series)
- Sam Foster, founder of Foster Grant, the eyewear company
- Sam Foster (politician) (1931–2014), Ulster Unionist politician
- Sam Foster (Coronation Street), a fictional character on the British soap opera Coronation Street
- Sam A. Foster, commander of the 5th Missouri Infantry Regiment (Union, 3 years)
