= Jeff Foster (spiritual teacher) =

English writer

Jeff Foster (born 30 July 1980) is an English writer and public speaker.

== Biography ==
Foster was born in 1980 in London, England. He studied Astrophysics at Cambridge University. At the time he was overwhelmed by feelings of despair and loneliness, which eventually led to physical illness and a personal breakdown soon after graduation. He was convinced he was going to die. Foster returned to live with his parents, reading and studying for a year on spirituality, searching for relief from his depression. This ended in 2006 with the dissolution of the sense of separation, which he understood to be a spiritual awakening.

He wrote a book, Life Without a Centre (Non-Duality Press), and was invited to hold small gatherings. Eventually, after having written several more books, the gatherings were supplemented with retreats and one-to-one sessions.

In 2011, Foster wrote an article explaining why he no longer considered himself to be an "Advaita teacher" or "nonduality teacher," pointing out problems with the one-sidedness of contemporary "radical Advaita" teachings. Instead of a strict impersonal philosophy, he started to embrace and emphasise the relative, human, personal existence in his writings and gatherings, a relativity which he felt was not in conflict with the impersonal Absolute.

== Works ==
- Life Without a Centre. Non-Duality Press. 2006. ISBN 978-0955399909.
- Beyond Awakening: The End of the Spiritual Search. Non-Duality Press. 2007. ISBN 978-0955399978.
- The Revelation of Oneness. Non-Duality Press. 2008. ISBN 978-0955829048.
- An Extraordinary Absence: Liberation in the Midst of a Very Ordinary Life. Non-Duality Press. 2009. ISBN 978-0956309105.
- The Wonder of Being: Awakening to an Intimacy Beyond Words. Non-Duality Books. 2010. ISBN 978-0956309181.
- The Deepest Acceptance: Radical Awakening in Ordinary Life. Sounds True. 2012. ISBN 978-1604078558.
- Falling In Love With Where You Are: A Year of Prose And Poetry on Radically Opening Up To the Pain and Joy of Life. New Harbinger Press. 2013. ISBN 978-1626257344.
- The Way of Rest: Finding The Courage to Hold Everything in Love. Sounds True. 2016. ISBN 978-1622037919.
- The Joy of True Meditation: Words of Encouragement for Tired Minds and Wild Hearts. New Sarum Press. 2019. ISBN 978-1999353537.
- You Were Never Broken: Poems to Save Your Life. Sounds True. 2020. ISBN 978-1683645597.
