= Norman Foster (disambiguation) =

Norman Foster (born 1935) is an English architect and designer.

Norman Foster or Norm Foster may also refer to:

- Norman Foster (bass) (1925–2000), American operatic bass and actor
- Norman Foster (cricketer) (1878–1960), Australian cricketer
- Norman Foster (director) (1903–1976), American film director and actor
- Norm Foster (ice hockey) (born 1965), Canadian ice hockey goaltender
- Norman Foster (military officer), British Army officer and chief of the Nigerian Army
- Norm Foster (playwright) (born 1949), Canadian playwright
- Norm Foster (politician) (1921–2006), Australian politician
- Norman Foster (rugby league) (1907–1999), English rugby league footballer of the 1930s for England and Keighley
- Norrie Foster (born 1944), Scottish decathlete

== See also ==
- Norman Foster Ramsey Jr. (1915–2011), American physicist
