= Ian Foster (musician) =

Canadian singer-songwriter (born 1981)

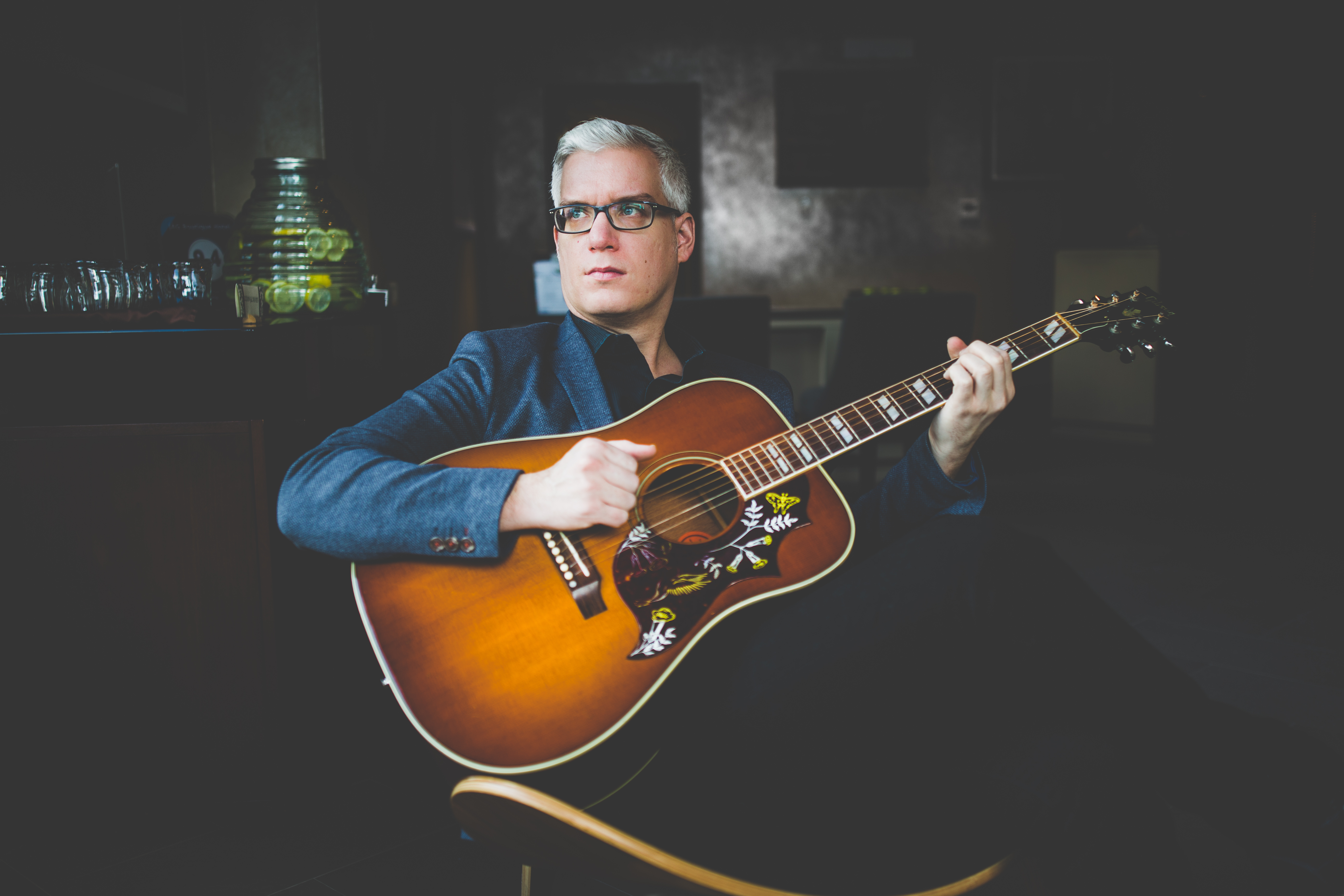

Background information
- Born: 1981 (age 44–45); St. John's, Newfoundland and Labrador, Canada
- Origin: St. John's, Newfoundland and Labrador, Canada
- Genres: Folk, Roots, Singer-Songwriter
- Occupations: Singer-Songwriter, record producer
- Instruments: vocals, guitar, piano
- Years active: 2003–present
- Label: IF Records
- Website: ianfoster.ca

Ian Foster (born 1981) is a Canadian singer-songwriter, producer and filmmaker, based in St. John's, Newfoundland and Labrador, Canada.

A multi-MusicNL and ECMA nominated artist, Foster has toured his modern folk/roots songs internationally since 2007.

Foster has produced albums for various artists including Kat McLevey ('Evergrown,' 2014) and Melanie O'Brien ('Shining in the Blue,' 2016). 'Evergrown' subsequently won two MusicNL Awards and received an ECMA nomination, and 'Shining in the Blue' was nominated for two MusicNL Awards in 2017.

Foster's film, Keystone, debuted at the 2015 Calgary International Film Festival; it was named one of their 'top 10 short films of the year.'

He composed the soundtrack to the award-winning documentary Hand.Line.Cod by Justin Simms.

== Discography ==
Title	Year
Room in the City	2008
We Begin Here	2009
Found: Music From the Unmade Film	2009
The Evening Light	2011
The Great Wave	2014
Sleeper Years	2017
A Week in December	2018

== Filmography ==
=== Short films ===
- Close to the Bone (2023)
- Keystone (2016)
- One More Song (2014)
