= Paul Foster =

Paul Foster may refer to:

- Paul Foster (bowls) (born 1973), Scottish bowls player
- Paul Foster (cartoonist) (1934–2003), cartoonist and writer
- Paul Foster (soccer) (born 1967), Australian soccer player
- Paul Foster (playwright) (1931–2021), American playwright, theater director, and producer
- Paul Foster (singer) (1920–1995), gospel singer
- Paul Foster (politician), British member of parliament for South Ribble since 2024
- Paul Frederick Foster (1889–1972), U.S. Navy vice admiral, Medal of Honor recipient
  - USS Paul F. Foster
- Paul H. Foster (1939–1967), USMC, Medal of Honor recipient, killed in action in Vietnam
- Paul L. Foster (born 1957), American businessman
- Paul W. Foster (1893–1952), American newspaper publisher and member of the Massachusetts House of Representatives
- Col. Paul Foster, a character in the British TV series UFO

== See also ==
- Paul Foster Case (1884–1954), American occultist and author
