= Eric Foster =

Eric Foster may refer to:

- Eric Foster (American football) (born 1985), American football player
- Eric Foster (politician) (born 1949), Canadian politician
- Eric Foster White (born 1962), American songwriter

== Fictional characters ==
- Eric Foster (Hollyoaks), a character in the television soap opera Hollyoaks
