= Leland Foster =

Professional baseball player

- Pitcher
- Born: July 17, 1910; Monroe, Louisiana, US
- Batted: Unknown Threw: Unknown

NSL debut
- 1932, for the Monroe Monarchs

Last NSL appearance
- 1932, for the Monroe Monarchs

NSL statistics
- Win–loss record: 0–0
- Earned run average: 13.50
- Strikeouts: 0
- Stats at Baseball Reference

Teams
- Monroe Monarchs (1932)

Leland Felton Foster (July 17, 1910 – April 21, 1967) was an American professional baseball pitcher in the Negro leagues. He played with the Monroe Monarchs in 1932.

Foster attended Morehouse College where he played college football for the Morehouse Maroon Tigers football team.
