= Kimberly N. Foster =

American writer and cultural critic

Kimberly Nicole Foster (born March 13, 1989) is an American writer and cultural critic. She is best known as the founder of the black women's interest website, For Harriet. She was named to Forbes' 30 under 30 in 2016. Foster's work has been recognized by Essence Magazine, Philadelphia Sun, Complex, Teen Vogue, and Atlanta Black Star.

== Life and career ==
Foster was born and raised in Oklahoma City. In 2010, as an undergraduate at Harvard University Foster created a blog called For Harriet, where she planned to "provide an online community for women of African descent to engage in honest dialogue about the complexities of Black womanhood". Her blog grew into a website of five properties as of February 2017.

Foster's writing centers social issues and has been cited in outlets such as Ebony and The Week. Her work has also been noted in the books The Language of Strong Black Womanhood: Myths, Models, Messages, and a New Mandate for Self-Care, Color Stories: Black Women and Colorism in the 21st Century, Revives My Soul Again, and Diverse Bodies, Diverse Practices.

Foster created YouTube and Patreon accounts for For Harriet in 2018. She stated that the accounts generate $25,000 monthly in revenue.

In 2021, the For Harriet channel was awarded a #YouTubeBlackVoices creator grant in recognition of Foster's work connecting popular culture to Black feminist thought.
