= Ruth S. Foster =

American businesswoman and politician

Ruth S. Foster(April 18, 1929-June 2, 2025) was an American businesswoman, and politician from Ellsworth, Maine.

== Early life ==
Foster was born in Machias, Maine to John & Edith Sullivan. She grew up between Machias and Ellsworth where she graduated from Ellsworth High School in 1946.

== Political Career ==
In 1978, Foster was elected as mayor of Ellsworth. She later went on to serve 10 years in the State Senate, and 4 years in the State House. During her time in the Maine Legislature Foster was known for her work on the appropriations committee
