= Leroy Foster =

Leroy Foster may refer to:

- LeRoy Foster (artist) (1925–1993), American painter
- Leroy Foster (musician) (1923–1958), American musician
