= Scott Foster =

Scott Foster may refer to:

- Scott Michael Foster (born 1985), American actor
- Scott Foster (ice hockey) (born 1982), Canadian ice hockey goaltender
- Scott Foster (basketball) (born 1967), American basketball referee
