= Asa Foster =

Asa Foster may refer to:

- Asa Lansford Foster (1798–1868), American businessman and geologist
- Asa Belknap Foster (1817–1877), Canadian politician and businessman
