= Jeff Foster =

Jeff Foster may refer to:

- Jeff Foster (basketball) (born 1977)
- Jeff Foster (spiritual teacher) (born 1980)
