= Kathy Foster =

Kathy Foster may refer to:

- Kathy Foster (musician), American musician
- Kathy Foster (basketball) (born 1960), Australian basketball player

== See also ==
- Cathy Foster, British sailor
- Katherine Foster (disambiguation)
- Kathleen Foster (disambiguation)
