= Adrian Foster (British Army officer) =

British Army officer

Major General Adrian Foster CMG MBE
- Military career
- Allegiance: United Kingdom
- Branch: British Army
- Service years: 1975–2018
- Rank: Major General
- Unit: Royal Artillery
- Conflicts: Sierra Leone Civil War
- Awards: Companion of the Order of St Michael and St George; Member of the Order of the British Empire; Queen's Commendation for Valuable Service

Major General Adrian John Foster CMG, MBE is a retired British Army officer who served as Deputy Force Commander of the UN Peacekeeping Mission in the Democratic Republic of the Congo (MONUSCO).

== Military career ==
Educated at the University of Southampton and the Royal Military Academy Sandhurst, Foster was commissioned into the Royal Artillery on 29 September 1975. He served as commanding officer of 26 Regiment Royal Artillery, in which role he saw action in Bosnia and Herzegovina. He went on to become Chief of Staff (Forces) for the United Nations Mission in Sierra Leone in July 2003, Director of Manning (Army) at the Ministry of Defence in June 2004, Deputy Force Commander of the UN Peacekeeping Mission in the Democratic Republic of the Congo (MONUSCO) in 2011 and Deputy Military Adviser for Peacekeeping in the Headquarters of the United Nations in New York City in 2013. He retired in January 2018.

He was appointed a Member of the Order of the British Empire in the 1991 Special Honours, awarded the Queen's Commendation for Valuable Service in 1998, and appointed a Companion of the Order of St Michael and St George in the Operational Honours and Awards List issued on 28 September 2012.
