= Edward Foster =

Ed, Eddie or Edward Foster may refer to:

== Sportsmen ==
- Ed Foster (baseball) (1880–1929), American pitcher for Cleveland Naps
- Eddie Foster (baseball) (1887–1937), American baseball third baseman
- Edward Foster (tennis) from 1957 U.S. National Championships – Men's Singles
- Eddie Foster (American football) (born 1954), American football player
- Ed Foster (cricketer) (born 1985), English batsman and wicket-keeper for Shropshire
- Edward Foster (badminton), 2004 IBF World Junior Championships

== Writers ==
- Edward Foster (physician) English author of 1781 text (from James Sims)
- Edward Foster (fingerprint expert) (born 1863), from 1863 in Canada
- Edward Powell Foster, American creator, starting in 1904, of constructed language Ro
- Ed Foster (writer) (1949–2008), American information technology columnist

== Others ==
- Edward Foster (VC) (1886–1946), English recipient during First World War
- Edward P. Foster (1896–1962), Canadian member of Legislative Assembly of Alberta
- Eddie Foster (1906–1989), American actor in The Three Stooges Meet Hercules
- Edward Foster, Canadian candidate in 1959 Manitoba general election
