= Frederick Foster =

Frederick or Fred Foster may refer to:

- Fred Foster (1931–2019), American record producer and songwriter
- Fred Foster (basketball) (1946–1985), American basketball player
- Fred Foster (American football) (1898–1968)
- Frederick Foster (cricketer) (1882–1956), Jamaican cricketer
- Frederick Foster (politician) (1777–?), Irish politician, MP for Bury St Edmunds
- Freddie Foster (born 1995), English cricketer
- Sir Frederick George Foster, 2nd Baronet (1816–1857), of the Foster baronets

== See also ==
- Frederic de Peyster Foster (1849–1929), American lawyer and philanthropist
