= Hugh F. Foster Jr. =

United States Army general

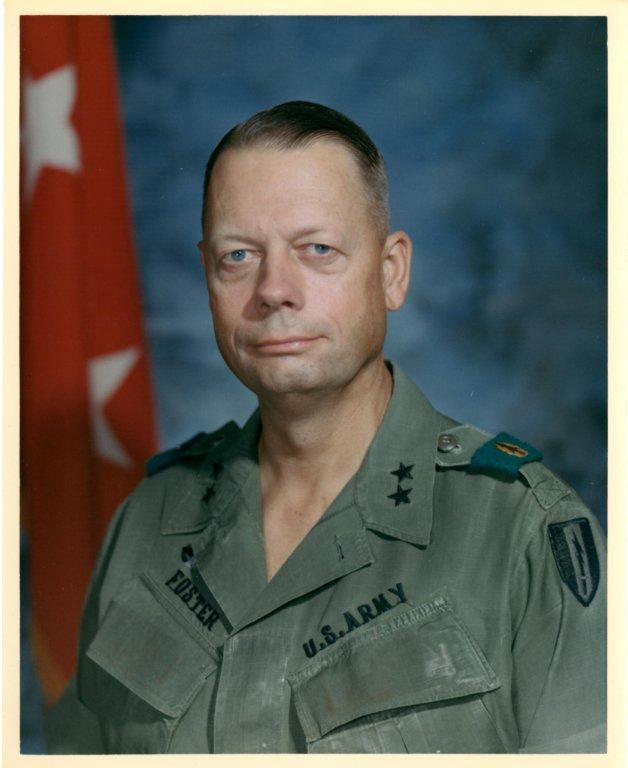
Commanding General 1st Signal Brigade, Vietnam, 1970

Hugh Franklin Foster Jr. (March 2, 1918 – December 13, 2004) was an American major general. He served in World War II and the Vietnam War, as well as with the United Nations Forces in Korea after the Korean War.

== Early life and education ==
Born and raised in Brooklyn, New York City, Foster became an Eagle Scout. He earned a B.S. degree from the United States Military Academy in 1941. Foster later received an M.S.E. degree in electrical engineering from Purdue University. His August 1949 master's thesis was entitled A study of the electrical power system at the United States Military Academy. He graduated from the Command and General Staff School in 1945 and the Army War College in 1962.

== World War II ==
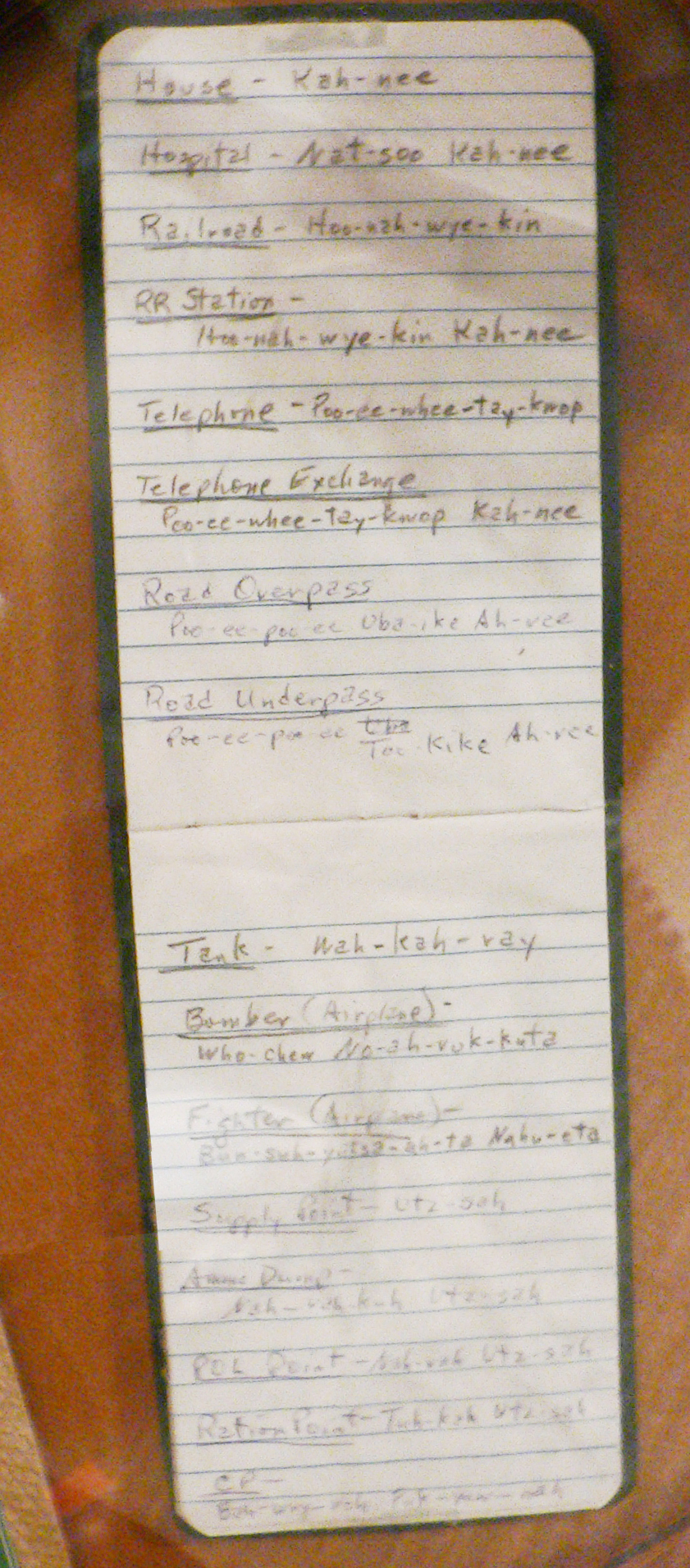
Foster's Comanche language code book is on display in the National Cryptologic Museum.

After graduating from West Point in 1941, Foster joined the Signal Corps. He was assigned to the 4th Signal Company, 4th Infantry Division stationed at Fort Benning. There he worked with a platoon of Comanche Indians to develop a voice code based on their tribal language. (See Comanche code talkers.)

He went on to serve in the North African campaign and Italian campaigns.

== Korea ==
During the Korean War, Foster was stationed in Austria as a battalion commander (63rd Signal Battalion). He was the Signal Officer for United Nations Forces in Korea in 1965–66.

== Career after Korea ==
On August 31, 1966, his temporary promotion to brigadier general was approved. Foster served as commanding general of the Army Communication Systems Agency from 1967 to 1969. On July 19, 1968, his promotion to brigadier general was made permanent and his temporary promotion to major general was authorized. Foster then served as commanding general of the Strategic Communications Command in Hawaii from 1969 to 1970.

== Vietnam War ==
During the Vietnam War, Foster commanded the 1st Signal Brigade from 1970 to 1971.

== Career after Vietnam ==
Following his service in the Vietnam War, Foster was given command of the United States Army's Electronics Command in Fort Monmouth, New Jersey in May 1971, serving until August 1975. His promotion to major general had been made permanent on April 5, 1971.

== Other contributions and achievements ==
After retirement, Foster eventually moved to Bucks County, Pennsylvania. He designed the Bucks County World War II memorial in downtown Doylestown, Pennsylvania.

In the 1980s when the Comanche Code Talkers received awards from the French government for their contributions to the war effort, they reached out and invited Foster to attend. This reconnected them. He and his family were adopted by a Comanche family and considered members of the Comanche nation. His name was "Telephone Red Sash."

== Personal ==
Foster married 2nd Lt. Mary Jane Schneider, an Army nurse, on July 21, 1946, in the Cadet Chapel at West Point. They had three sons and three grandchildren.

He died at his home in Furlong, Pennsylvania. Foster and his wife were interred at the West Point Cemetery.
