= Bertie Foster =

English footballer

Personal information
- Full name: Albert William Foster
- Date of birth: 1 November 1884
- Place of birth: Sleaford, Lincolnshire, England
- Date of death: 29 May 1959 (aged 74)
- Place of death: Sleaford, Lincolnshire, England
- Position: Outside right

Senior career*
Years	Team	Apps	(Gls)
- Grantham Avenue
1906–1912	Lincoln City	67	(1)
1912–1914	Grantham		
1914–1915	Lincoln City	0	(0)
- * Club domestic league appearances and goals

Albert William Foster (1 November 1884 – 29 May 1959) was an English professional footballer who made 67 appearances in the Football League playing for Lincoln City. He played as an outside right.

== Life and career ==
Foster was born in Sleaford, Lincolnshire. He played football for Grantham Avenue before beginning his professional career with Lincoln City, then playing in the Football League Second Division. He made his debut in December 1906, and played regularly until the 1908–09 season in the Midland League. Thereafter his appearances became infrequent, and his last senior game was in early 1912. He spent two seasons at Central Alliance club Grantham before returning to Lincoln City for the last season before the First World War, though without appearing for the first team.

Foster later worked as a licensed victualler in Sleaford, where he died in 1959.
