= Ralph Foster =

Ralph Foster may refer to:

- Ralph Foster (American football coach) (1884–1956), college football coach for the Citadel Bulldogs
- Ralph Foster (tackle) (1917–1999), American football player
- Ralph D. Foster (1893–1984), American broadcaster
- Ralph G. Foster (1935–2021), British Paralympic athlete
