= Catherine Foster =

Catherine Foster may refer to:

- Catherine Foster (soprano), English operatic soprano
- Catherine Foster (murderer), English woman who murdered her husband
- Cathy Foster (born 1956), British sailor
- Kitty Foster (c. 1790–1863), freed African American woman, notable for having owned property
