= Kevin Foster (cyclist) =

American mountain biker (born 1960)

Joseph Kevin Foster IV
- Born: February 29, 1960 (age 66); Waterbury, Connecticut, United States
- Occupations: Mountain biker, actor, writer, producer
- Known for: Great Wall of China tour, American Summits tour, Tour de Cuba

Joseph Kevin Foster IV (born February 29, 1960), also known as Kevin Foster, is an American mountain biker, actor, writer, and producer.

Foster is known for his three biking tours of the Great Wall of China, the highest points in each U.S. state, and Cuba.

== Early life ==
Foster was born in Waterbury, Connecticut to Joseph Adrian, an accountant, and Stella Lucia (née Vicedomini), a homemaker. His siblings included a younger brother and two younger sisters. His heritage is English, Irish, and Welsh from his father's side, and Spanish, Italian, and Jewish from his mother. Foster was raised in a predominantly Italian household in the North End section of Waterbury, later living in several nearby towns. Foster's mother gave her children a strong religious background that began as Catholic and moved on to Lutheran and Episcopalian.

In 1968, Foster received an electric shock from a live wire and fell approximately 30 feet. He suffered memory loss, and doctors told Foster's parents that he would never walk again. Foster did eventually regain some of his memory, although his memory of his friends, families, and relatives up to that point was gone. After four years of therapy, Foster was completely freed from his wheelchair. Foster credits the experience with changing his outlook on life, which led him to dedicating his life to Christianity.

In 1972, as he was first learning to ride a bicycle, Foster saw a news broadcast of U.S. President Richard Nixon meeting with Chairman Mao Zedong atop the Great Wall of China. The sight inspired Foster to bicycle along the Wall from one end to the other.

== Acting career ==
Foster had begun to act at the age of three, appearing in church and school plays and community theatre. At the age of 16, he began appearing at Connecticut's Southbury Playhouse and other summer stock and dinner theater venues around Connecticut.

In fall 1980, Foster entered the American Academy of Dramatic Arts in New York City. He later trained with Lee Strasberg at Actors Studio; Uta Hagen and Herbert Berghof at HB Studio; and with Stella Adler. He continued stage work in and around New York, working his way up from regional theatre, to "Shakespeare in the Park" with Joseph Papp, to off-Broadway, and finally to Broadway, where he appeared in the Vietnam drama, Go Home, Spec 5. He made his film debut in 1980 as an extra in Friday the 13th Part 2.

During this time, he supplemented his income by giving fencing lessons and writing for various newspapers, as well as writing two unpublished novels and several plays.

== Biking career ==
=== Great Wall of China tour ===
With the backing of National Geographic and U.S. Senator Chris Dodd, Foster received permission from the Chinese government in 1987 to attempt to become the first person to travel the Wall's 2,000 miles (3,200 km) by bicycle. Shortly after receiving permission, Foster was hit by a truck while bicycling, and had to cancel the tour. He attempted to revive the plan the next year, but had difficulty raising the necessary funds. In 1989, a week before Foster was to leave for China, the Tiananmen Square protests broke out. The tour was postponed once again, and several corporations dropped their sponsorship fearing a negative association from the massacre.

In the wake of the cancellation, Foster broke the world record for traveling the length of the New York City Subway in October 1989, finishing in a time of 26 hours, 21 minutes, and 8 seconds. A month after setting this world record, Foster flew to China to begin preparations for a Great Wall tour the following spring. The Chinese government would allow Foster to cover approximately 2,000 miles (3,200 km) of the Great Wall from the furthest point west at Jiayuguan to the "First Gate Under Heaven" at Shanhaiguan in the east. In exchange, he would promote unity between the U.S. and China. The Chinese government hoped that this would bolster tourism, which had dropped to all-time lows since the events of Tiananmen Square.

Foster began his ride on May 9, 1990, wearing a red, white and blue helmet and uniform and riding a newly developed mountain bike in the same design. As he made his first tire tracks in the wall, Foster commented, "Now I know how Neil Armstrong felt when he walked on the moon." His expedition lasted 50 days, during which he traveled 1,174.8 miles (1,890.7 km). Foster faced challenges such as sandstorms, a crash leading to three broken ribs, rain and hail storms, monsoons, and temperatures up to 130 degrees Fahrenheit (54 degrees Celsius). He traveled for 15–18 hours per day, covering 25–30 miles (40–48 km), and lost approximately 30 pounds (17.7 kg) over his three months in China. Foster and his five-man crew, who carried food and water in their Jeeps, would occasionally stay in a nearby town to refresh themselves. Due to military restrictions, Foster was not allowed to cycle the 1,500 miles (2,400 km) that made up the Wall's middle section, which was in the area that bordered China from Inner Mongolia. He and his team diverted north to Hohhot, Inner Mongolia, and then south toward Beijing.

On June 29, 1990, Foster finished his tour at Shanhaiguan, where he was met by tourists, media, hosts, and sponsors. Guards detained Foster and his crew for an hour of interrogation. He earned the 1990 Cyclist of the Year award over his friend, Greg LeMond, who had won the Tour de France; the cycling industry dubbed Foster's journey as, "the last, greatest, cycling adventure on the face of the earth." While Foster had initially planned to return to his acting career, he was convinced by his manager, Charlie Litsky, that he could do much better as an adventure cyclist than a starving artist.

=== American Summits tour ===
Following the Great Wall tour, Foster moved from Ojai, California, to the community of Kaweah, at the base of Sequoia National Park. One day when he was cycling in the mountains, Foster found a "no biking" sign in an area where he was used to training, as part of a battle by the Sierra Club to keep bikes off the trails.

The encounter inspired Foster's American Summits tour, the goal of which to place a mountain bike atop the highest natural point in each of the fifty U.S. states. Most of Foster's previous sponsors returned, although his bicycle changed from a Cannondale to a Klein, still in the red, white, and blue color scheme.

The tour started in the summer of 1993 with multiple setbacks. Just before the tour began, Foster's manager died suddenly at the age of 33. On his first high point, Humphreys Peak of Arizona, Foster got lost on the way down from the summit. Foster succeeded in summiting 48 high points on his first try. California's Mount Whitney took him two attempts to succeed, while on Mount Rainier, Washington state's highpoint, Foster was placed under arrest at the base. After a court hearing held in a parking lot, Foster was allowed to take his bike to the summit as long as he left his wheels behind.

The last stop on the tour was Alaska's Denali, the highest natural point on the North American continent. In the summer of 1995, Foster and his team of three others were dropped off by plane at the mountain's 7,500 ft (2,300 m) base during a blizzard. Immediately afterward, as the plane tried to depart, it was flipped upside-down and destroyed, although the pilot escaped with minor injuries. After they reached the 17,200 ft (5,200 m) level and made camp with about 75 other climbers, a storm trapped the group for six days, leading to three deaths. As the storm rose above them briefly, Foster and his team reluctantly retreated, and his sponsors declined to fund a return trip.

The tour received significant press coverage. Following the tour, the Sierra Club and members of several cycling organizations sat down to negotiate sharing the country's trails.

=== Tour de Cuba ===
Following the American Summits tour, Foster accepted an invitation to the country from Cuban president Fidel Castro and began planning a tour across the nation, in spite of the United States embargo against Cuba prohibiting Americans from visiting or doing business there. Several of Foster's sponsors declined to support the tour, and U.S. senator Jesse Helms called for Foster to be arrested upon his return.

Foster began the Tour de Cuba on November 21, 1997. Foster's journey covered 1,158 miles (1,863 km), from the easternmost point at Maisí to Playa Larga on the Zapata Peninsula. Unlike his previous tours, Foster rode with a co-rider representing Cuba, Alfredo Rodriguez Martinez. At the beginning of the tour, Foster was arrested when Maisí's captain of the guard could not initially verify that Foster was a guest of Castro. The matter was cleared up the next day, and Foster was able to begin his ride. Over the three-week tour, Foster visited many of Cuba's landmarks, such as the grave of national hero José Martí in Santiago de Cuba, Cuba's highest natural point at Pico Turquino, and the Bay of Pigs. The tour completed on December 11, 1997, and would be the longest bicycle tour in Cuba's history until Ben Graham Jones' crossing two decades later.

On his way home that December, Foster was met by government officials at the Toronto, Ontario, Canada, airport while trying to board a connecting flight. Foster's passport was scanned and sent to Washington, D.C., but no arrest or further confrontations ever materialized.

In January 1998, Foster announced his retirement from being an adventure cyclist, having proved that a mountain bike could be taken anywhere with the right motivation.

== Post-retirement projects ==
In the years following his retirement, Foster made many personal appearances at events for his sponsors and for charity, as well as private engagements. Since 2006, he has held an annual charity bike ride in Sequoia National Park to benefit Smile Train, an organization providing surgery to children with cleft lips and palates.

Foster returned to acting with the 2005 feature film Yesterday's Dreams, which he wrote, produced, and starred in. In 2008, he co-wrote and executive produced the documentary Hollywood on Fire, about Christian influence in the film industry. The film was released in 2009.

In 2009, Foster co-produced his friend Danny Saber's debut album, Saber Bytes.
