= Brian Foster =

Brian Foster may refer to:

- Brian Foster (fighter) (born 1984), American mixed martial artist
- Brian Foster (ice hockey) (born 1987), American professional ice hockey goaltender
- Brian Foster (BMX rider) (born 1972), American motocross racer
- Brian Foster (physicist) (born 1954), British physicist
- Brian Foster (lawyer), worked on behalf of Guantanamo captive Muktar Yahya Najee al-Warafi
- Brian Foster, husband of Mrs Arlene Foster

== See also ==
- Bryan Foster of Offbeats
