= Gary Foster =

Gary Foster may refer to:

- Gary Evans Foster (1894–1951), US soldier during World War One
- Gary Foster (musician) (1936–2026), American instrumentalist
- Gary D. Foster, British phytopathologist
