= Krishna Foster =

American environmental chemist

- Born: January 7, 1970 (age 56); Culver City, California, U.S.
- Education: Spelman College; University of Colorado Boulder; Helix High School
- Scientific career
- Workplaces: California State University, Los Angeles; University of California, Irvine
- Thesis: Laboratory studies of the interaction of hydrogen halides with ice films (1998)

Krishna Lynne Foster (born January 7, 1970) is an American environmental chemist who is a professor at California State University, Los Angeles. Her research considers the impact of sunlight on pollutants. Foster has worked to improve the representation of people of colour studying chemistry.

== Early life and education ==
Foster was born in Culver City, California. Her parents, Warren and Frances Foster, worked at IBM and San Diego State University. Foster has said that he was always encouraged to work hard, and she eventually attended the Helix High School. She has said that she enjoyed baking as a child, primarily because of how much chemistry it involved. Whilst still a teenager, Foster was awarded a NASA women in science fellowship. Foster attended Spelman College, which she graduated in 1992. As a student at Spelman, Foster took classes in environmental chemistry, and decided that this was a research area she would like to pursue. She moved to the University of Colorado Boulder for her graduate studies, where she specialised in hydrogen halides. In 1998 she moved back to California, joining University of California, Irvine as a postdoctoral researcher, where she worked alongside Barbara J. Finlayson-Pitts. Here her work made use of mass spectrometry to investigate sea salt particles.

== Research and career ==
Foster was appointed to the faculty at California State University, Los Angeles in 2000. That year she took part in Alert 2000, an international fieldwork programme to study the photochemistry of snow in Alert, Nunavut. Her research proposal looked to measure the concentrations of gaseous halogens using atmospheric-pressure chemical ionization. She has said that she joined Cal State LA because it valued teaching as much as research. There she has studied the impact of sunlight on pollutants, primarily at the air/water interface. She was awarded tenure in 2006 and the California State University, Los Angeles Distinguished Women Award in 2007. Beyond her work on pollutants, Foster has studied how phosphorus might have first been incorporated into living cells.

Foster has worked to make science and technology more inclusive and more welcoming to students of colour. She established the Cal State Minorities Opportunities in Research programme, which introduces students from marginalised backgrounds to research methods. The National Science Foundation named Cal State LA as one of the top institutions for Latin Americans. She made use of the American Chemical Society Project SEED initiative to host Black chemists in her research lab. For her efforts, she was named a Minority Access National Role Model. She is the Director of the Minority Biomedical Research Support-Research Initiative for Scientific Enhancement) (MBBRS-RISE) programme, which supports students of colour who look to become research scientists.

== Select publications ==
- Foster, K. L. (2001-01-19). "The Role of Br2 and BrCl in Surface Ozone Destruction at Polar Sunrise". Science. 291 (5503): 471–474. Bibcode:2001Sci...291..471F. doi:10.1126/science.291.5503.471. PMID 11161198.
- Hanrahan, Grady; Salmassi, Tina M.; Khachikian, Crist S.; Foster, Krishna L. (2005-04-15). "Reduced inorganic phosphorus in the natural environment: significance, speciation and determination". Talanta. Analysis of Phosphorus in Environmental and Agricultural Samples. 66 (2): 435–444. doi:10.1016/j.talanta.2004.10.004. ISSN 0039-9140. PMID 18970004.
- Spicer, Chester W; Plastridge, Robert A; Foster, Krishna L; Finlayson-Pitts, Barbara J; Bottenheim, Jan W; Grannas, Amanda M; Shepson, Paul B (2002-05-01). "Molecular halogens before and during ozone depletion events in the Arctic at polar sunrise: concentrations and sources". Atmospheric Environment. Air/Snow/Ice Interactions in the Arctic: Results from ALERT 2000 and SUMMIT 2000. 36 (15): 2721–2731. Bibcode:2002AtmEn..36.2721S. doi:10.1016/S1352-2310(02)00125-5. ISSN 1352-2310.
