= Barry Foster =

Barry Foster may refer to:

- Barry Foster (actor) (1927–2002), English actor
- Barry Foster (American football) (born 1968), former American football running back.
- Barry Foster (footballer) (born 1951), retired English footballer
