= Donald Foster =

Donald Foster may refer to:

- Donald Foster (actor) (1889–1969), American film and television actor
- Don Foster, Baron Foster of Bath (born 1947), British Liberal Democrat politician
- Donald Wayne Foster (born 1950), American Shakespeare scholar
- Don Foster (screenwriter), known for the American television sitcom Dharma & Greg (1997–2002)
