= Kathleen Foster =

Kathleen Foster may refer to:

- Kathy Foster (musician)
- Kathleen Foster Campbell (1897–1991), née Kathleen Foster

== See also ==
- Kathy Foster (disambiguation)
- Katherine Foster (disambiguation)
