= Nigel Foster =

Nigel Foster may refer to:

- Nigel Foster (pianist), English piano accompanist
- Nigel Foster (kayaker) (born 1952), English sea kayaker
