= Derek Foster =

Derek Foster may refer to:

- Derek Foster (rugby league), rugby league footballer for Castleford
- Derek Foster (cricketer) (1907–1980), English cricketer
- Derek Foster, Baron Foster of Bishop Auckland (1937–2019), British Member of Parliament
