= Reginald Foster =

Reginald Foster may refer to:

- R. E. Foster (Reginald Erskine Foster, 1878–1914), England cricket and football captain
- Reginald Foster (Latinist) (1939–2020), American Latin expert and Roman Catholic priest
