= R. L. Foster =

American politician

Member of the Georgia House of Representatives from the 6-2 district
- In office 1973–1983
- Succeeded by: Phil Foster

Personal details
- Born: December 19, 1919 Whitfield County, Georgia, U.S.
- Died: December 24, 2005 (aged 86)
- Party: Democratic
- Spouse: Ruby Elizabeth Parker
- Children: 4; including Phil Foster
- Education: University of Georgia

R. L. Foster (December 19, 1919 – December 24, 2005) was an American politician. He served as a Democratic member for the 6-2 district of the Georgia House of Representatives.

== Life and career ==
Foster was born in Whitfield County, Georgia. He attended the University of Georgia and served in the United States Air Force during World War II.

In 1973, Foster was elected to represent the 6-2 district of the Georgia House of Representatives. He served until 1983, when he was succeeded by Phil Foster.

Foster died in December 2005, at the age of 86.
