= Lord Foster (disambiguation) =

Norman Foster, Baron Foster of Thames Bank (born 1935), is a British architect and designer.

Lord Foster may also refer to:

- Derek Foster, Baron Foster of Bishop Auckland (1937–2019), British politician
- Don Foster, Baron Foster of Bath (born 1947), British politician
