= Governor Foster =

Governor Foster may refer to:

- Charles Foster (Ohio politician) (1828–1904), 35th Governor of Ohio
- Mike Foster (American politician) (born 1930), 53rd Governor of Louisiana, grandson of Murphy J. Foster
- Murphy J. Foster (1849–1921), 31st Governor of Louisiana
- Robert Sidney Foster (1913–2005), Governor of Fiji from 1968 to 1973 and Governor of the Solomon Islands from 1964 to 1969
