= Kate Foster =

Kate Foster may refer to:

== Writers ==
- Kate Foster (Australian writer), writer of children's books, co-founder of the DANZ Children's Book Award in 2024
- Kate Foster (Scottish writer) (born 1974/5), Scottish writer of historical fiction

== Others ==
- Kate Foster (diplomat), British diplomat
- Kate Foster (snowboarder) (born 1985), British Olympic athlete

== See also ==
- Kat Foster, American actress
