= Kenneth Foster =

Kenneth Foster may refer to:

- Kenneth Foster (criminal) (born 1976), American prisoner
- Kenneth Foster (figure skater) (born 1951), British figure skater
- Kenneth Foster (politician) (1866–1930), British politician
- Ken Foster, Australian rugby league player

== See also ==
- Kenny Foster (born 1985), American mixed martial artist
