= Lillian Foster =

Canadian journalist

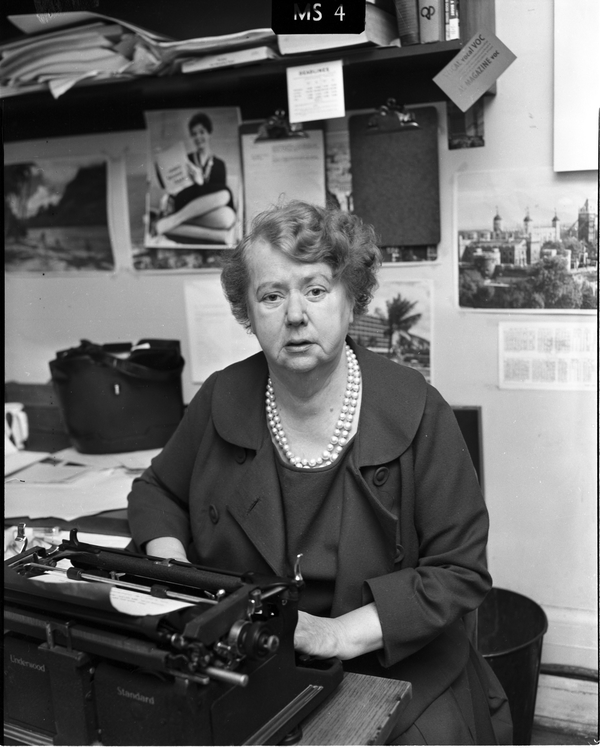
- Born: Owen Sound, Ontario, Canada
- Died: 24 September 1963; Toronto, Ontario, Canada
- Occupation: journalist
- Writing career
- Years active: 1916–1963

Lillian Foster was a Canadian journalist who worked as a reporter at the Toronto Telegram for forty seven years. Although she held several roles at the paper, she is best known for the 15 years she spent as the fashion editor.

Foster was born in Owen Sound. She began working for the Toronto Telegram in 1916 compiling lists of World War I casualties. She later recalled how seeing the clippings of birth and death announcements pasted in family bibles underscored the importance of getting names right, explaining that: "if what I write is going to be that important to any family it's got to be right." She went on to cover various portfolios including suburban affairs and the Board of Education, and wrote biographies of Toronto business figures as part of a series called "A Peep Behind the Curtain of Time". Historian Majory Lang described Forster as a "zealous advocate on behalf of her readers" when it came to Foster's time as the author of "Shopper", a column dedicated to opinions about goods and where to find them in the city.

Despite her many roles at the paper, Foster is best known for her work as fashion editor. Beginning in the 1940s, she reported on each of the New York fashion shows for 15 years, with the exception of one season during which time she was a member of the first Canadian tourist party to visit Russia. She was a promoter of Canadian made clothing, regularly serving as a commentator at fashion shows held during the Canadian National Exhibition.

Foster remained with the Telegram for forty seven years. Her role at the paper was celebrated in 1951 by 750 friends who gathered to recognize her 35th year at the paper. In response to questions about her retirement she commented "I'll go out of here when they have to carry me out." In addition to her work at the Telegram, Forster was a fan of horse racing and was a member of the Canadian Women's Press Club, at one time serving as the Toronto Branch president.

She died 24 September 1963 at Toronto's St. Michael's Hospital following a short illness attributed to a heart condition exacerbated by diabetes.
