= Ernest Foster =

English cricketer

Ernest Foster (23 November 1873 – 16 April 1956) was an English first-class cricketer, who played one match for Yorkshire County Cricket Club against the Marylebone Cricket Club (MCC) at Lord's in 1901.

Born in Bramley, West Riding of Yorkshire, England, Foster was a right arm fast medium bowler, who bowled ten overs without success and conceded 27 runs. He scored two runs in his only innings.

Foster died in April 1956 in Moor Allerton, Leeds, Yorkshire.
