= Martin Foster =

Martin Foster may refer to:

- Martin Foster (footballer) (born 1977), English footballer
- Martin D. Foster (1861–1919), U.S. Representative from Illinois
- Martin Foster (golfer) (born 1952), English golfer
