= Timothy Foster =

Timothy or Tim Foster may refer to:

- Tim Foster (soccer) (born 1969), American soccer player
- Tim Foster (born 1970), English rower
- Timothy Foster (settler) (1720–1783), first colonial settler of Winthrop, Maine
- Timothy Foster, petitioner in the Supreme Court case of Foster v. Chatman
