= Arthur Foster (cricketer) =

English cricketer, physician, and soldier

Personal information
- Full name: Arthur Leslie Foster
- Born: 1 November 1891; Balham, Surrey, England
- Died: 16 August 1956 (aged 64); East Stour, Dorset, England
- Batting: Unknown
- Bowling: Unknown

Domestic team information
- Years: Team
- 1924/25–1925/26: Europeans

Career statistics
Competition	First-class
Matches	3
Runs scored	106
Batting average	21.20
100s/50s	–/–
Top score	44
Balls bowled	?
Wickets	0
Bowling average	–
5 wickets in innings	–
10 wickets in match	–
Best bowling	–
Catches/stumpings	1/–
- Source: Cricinfo, 23 December 2023

Arthur Leslie Foster (1 November 1881 – 16 August 1956) was an English first-class cricketer, medical doctor, and an officer in the British Army.

The son of the merchant Norman R. Foster, he was born at Balham in November 1881. He was educated at Westminster School, before matriculating to study medicine at Guy's Hospital in Southwark. From there, he gained a commission into the Royal Army Medical Corps (RAMC) as a probationary lieutenant in February 1908. After being confirmed in the rank in August of that year. he was promoted to captain in August 1911. Following the end of the First World War, he was made an acting major in August 1919, prior to gaining the permanent rank in February 1920.

While stationed in British India, Foster played first-class cricket for the Europeans cricket team on three occasions in the Lahore Tournament's of 1924–25 and 1925–26, playing twice against the Muslims and once against the Sikhs. In these, he scored 106 runs at an average of 21.20, with a highest score of 44. In the RAMC, he was promoted to lieutenant colonel in November 1932, with a further promotion to colonel following in October 1936. He retired from active service in November 1938 with the rank of colonel. Foster was recalled to service in the Second World War, during which he was mentioned in dispatches in December 1940. His war service lasted until November 1941, when he exceeded the age for recall. Foster died in August 1956 at East Stour, Dorset; he had married Edith Kate Summerhayes in November 1908.
