= Daniel Foster =

Daniel Foster may refer to:

- Danny Foster (footballer) (born 1984), English footballer
- Daniel Foster (Australian footballer) (born 1982), former Australian rules footballer
- Danny Foster (musician) (born 1979), English pop/soul singer and television personality
- Dan Foster (DJ) (1958–2020), American DJ based in Nigeria
- Dan Foster (politician) (born 1948), Democratic member of the West Virginia Senate
- Dan Foster (physician) (1930–2018), American physician
- Daniel Foster (rugby league) (born 1993), Tongan international
