= Phil Foster (politician) =

American politician

Member of the Georgia House of Representatives from the 6th district
- In office January 10, 1983 – January 14, 1991
- Preceded by: Ravenel L. Foster
- Succeeded by: Harold Mann

Personal details
- Born: Philip Anthony Foster; April 4, 1958 (age 68) Dalton, Georgia, U.S.
- Party: Democratic
- Parent: R. L. Foster (father)

Philip Anthony Foster (born April 4, 1958) is an American politician. He served four terms in the Georgia House of Representatives.

== Early life and education ==
Foster was born in Whitfield County, Georgia, in 1958. His father was Ravenel L. Foster, who served in the Georgia House of Representatives between 1973 and 1983.

== Political career ==
In 1982, Foster was elected to the State House at the age of 24, succeeding his father. He served in the chamber as a member of the Democratic Party from 1983 until 1991. As his North Georgia district became increasingly friendly to Republicans down-ballot, Foster faced more difficult reelection campaigns. He was ultimately defeated in 1990 by Republican Harold Mann. The two squared off a second time in 1996, though Mann won decisively and Foster's political career ended.

== Personal life ==
Foster lives in Dalton, Georgia.
