= Douglas Foster =

Douglas Foster may refer to:

- Douglas A. Foster (born 1952), professor of church history
- Douglas Eads Foster (1875–1962), councillor in Los Angeles, California
