= Alfred Foster =

Alfred Foster may refer to:

- Alfred Foster (judge) (1886–1962), Australian judge
- Alfred Foster (mathematician) (1904–1994), American mathematician
