= Nat Foster =

American pioneer (1766–1840)

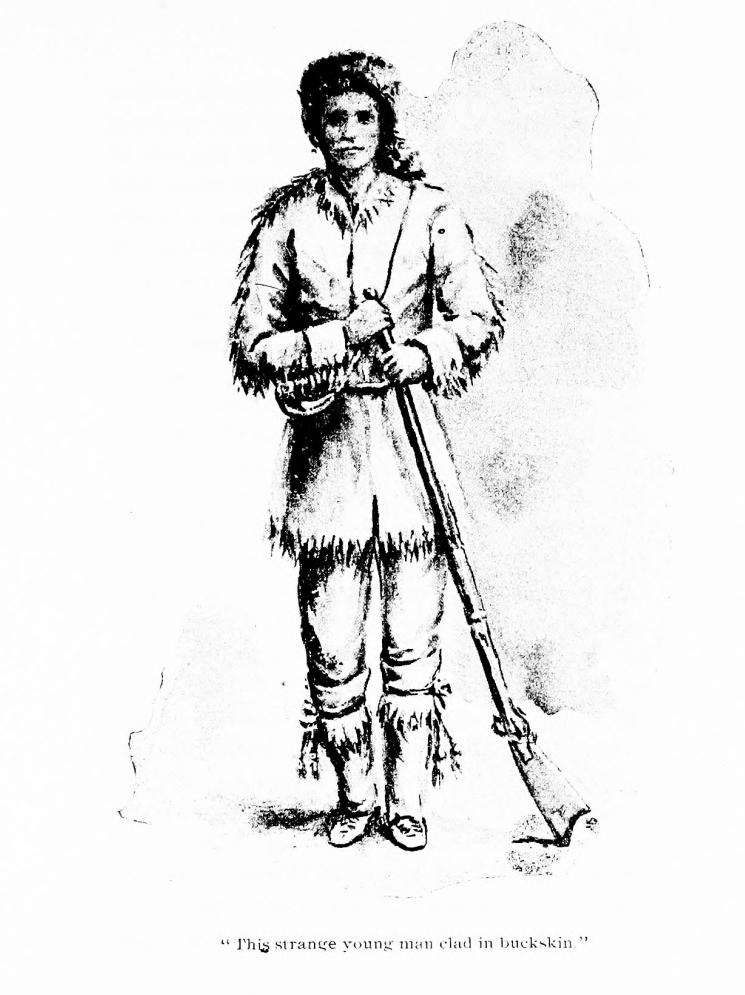
Nat Foster, age 21

Nathaniel (Nat) Foster Jr. (June 30, 1766–Mar 14, 1840) was a pioneer hunter and trapper in the Adirondack Mountains of Upstate New York. Foster is widely credited with being the model for James Fenimore Cooper's character of "Natty Bumppo."

== Personal life ==
Foster was born in 1766 in Hinsdale, New Hampshire, then a sparsely-settled wilderness. When he was about ten years old his father joined the Continental Army to fight in the American Revolution. The family, including Mrs. Foster, Nathaniel, and his five siblings, ranging in age from eleven to an infant, stayed at home to fend for themselves. In 1782 the elder Foster returned home, and determined to move his family west, into New York. They settled in the vicinity of Fish House, New York, north of Johnstown.

When Foster was around twenty-three or twenty-four he married Jemima Streeter and the couple settled in Salisbury in Herkimer County, New York. He farmed in the summer and hunted game in the winter, wolves, bear, and panther, and trapped for furs. He carried an unusual type of rifle called a "double shooter", which had one barrel and two locks mounted vertically so the rifle was able to fire two separate shots.

In 1832 Foster moved into the former home of Charles F. Herreshoff in Old Forge, New York, and rented his farm in Salisbury to his son, Amos. By this time he had become something of a celebrity, and there are many accounts by visitors to his home.

== Feud ==
In Old Forge Foster engaged in a feud with a Mohawk Indian, Peter Waters, called "Drid". A series of incidents finally resulted in a knife fight, in which Foster was wounded. Following this, Drid accompanied a hunting party up the lake while Foster remained behind. He lay in wait for their return at a place now called "Indian Point", and shot Drid as the latter approached in his canoe. Foster was tried for the murder and acquitted.

== Death ==
Following the trial Foster and his wife spent time with relatives in Wilkes-Barre, Pennsylvania. While there he was stricken, and determined to return home to his daughter, Jemima, in Ava, New York, in present-day Oneida County. He died and was buried there in 1840.

== Foster and Natty Bumppo ==
Clad in his buckskins, Foster announced in a St. Johnsville tavern in 1787 that his name was "Leatherstocking," and 26 years after that incident James Fenimore Cooper undoubtedly used him as the prototype for Natty Bumppo's adventures.

The assumption that Foster is the hero of Cooper's Leatherstocking Tales I think is well founded. I believe the reader will agree with me, that the character of Nat Foster as portrayed by the facts here presented, and the character of Natty Bumppo of Cooper, are wonderfully similar; which, taken with the unbiased opinions of men of Foster's time, are weighty arguments in favor of the idea advanced.
