= T. Mary Foster =

New Zealand professor emerita of psychology

Therese Mary Foster

Academic background
- Education: University of Auckland
- Theses: An investigation into choice between fixed-interval and mixed-interval schedules of reinforcement (1973); An analysis of concurrent-chain choice (1976)
- Doctoral advisor: Michael Davison

Therese Mary Foster is a New Zealand behavioural psychologist, and is professor emerita at the University of Waikato. Her research focuses on animal behaviour and behavioural analysis.

== Academic career ==
Foster completed a MSc in psychology titled An investigation into choice between fixed-interval and mixed-interval schedules of reinforcement at the University of Auckland. She then went on to complete a PhD in psychology, also at Auckland, in 1976. Her thesis was on concurrent-chain choice, a type of reinforcement. Foster undertook professional training as a psychologist and then joined the faculty of the University of Waikato, rising to full professor. In 2017 Foster was appointed professor emerita.

Foster's research covers animal behaviour and psychology. Foster and William Temple set up the Animal Behaviour and Welfare Research Centre at Waikato. Foster was also responsible for co-leading the development of an applied behaviour analysis (ABA) programme at Waikato in 2006, with Dr James McEwan, aimed at training psychologists to work in education and disability. Foster has researched behaviour in animals including brushtail possums, cows, domestic chickens, dogs and horses, on subjects such as selective attention, visual discrimination and reinforcement timing. She trained chickens to use pecks to indicate their preferred choices, for instance they were able to indicate their preferred dust-bathing material, to communicate their preferred food, and whether they would prefer to be alone or with a more dominant chicken. She has also worked on human behaviour, in chronic pain patients and in autistic children.

== Selected works ==
- Karen L Layton; Edwards, Timothy; T Mary Foster (2022). "Response-strengthening effects of same- and different-context DRA training: The effects of two disruptors". Journal of the Experimental Analysis of Behavior. 118 (3): 376–397. doi:10.1002/jeab.796. PMC 9804796. PMID 36054301. Wikidata Q125754758.
- Shinichi Nakagawa; T. Mary Foster (2004). "The case against retrospective statistical power analyses with an introduction to power analysis". Acta Ethologica. 7 (2): 103–108. doi:10.1007/s10211-004-0095-z. Wikidata Q57269623.
- R. Kilgour; T.M. Foster; W. Temple; L.R. Matthews; K.J. Bremner (1991). "Operant technology applied to solving farm animal problems. An assessment". Applied Animal Behaviour Science. 30 (1–2): 141–166. doi:10.1016/0168-1591(91)90092-c. Wikidata Q125725274.
- B S. Cleland; Therese Mary Foster; W Temple (2000). "Resurgence: the role of extinction". Behavioural Processes. 52 (2–3): 117–129. doi:10.1016/s0376-6357(00)00131-5. PMID 11164680. Wikidata Q73409800.
- S Gunnarsson; L.R Matthews; T.M Foster; W Temple (2000). "The demand for straw and feathers as litter substrates by laying hens". Applied Animal Behaviour Science. 65 (4): 321–330. doi:10.1016/s0168-1591(99)00065-9. Wikidata Q125725275.
- Poling, Alan Dale; Timothy L. Edwards; Marc Weeden; T. Mary Foster (2011). "The Matching Law". Psychological Record. 61 (2): 313–322. doi:10.1007/bf03395762. Wikidata Q125725276.
