= C. Stephen Foster =

American ophthalmologist

- Born: West Virginia
- Occupation: Ophthalmologist
- Years active: 1977-current
- Known for: Founder/CEO, Massachusetts Eye Research & Surgery Institution

Charles Stephen Foster is an American ophthalmologist known for his research and treatment of ocular inflammatory disease (OID) with immunomodulatory therapy. In addition, Foster is the author of approximately 1,000 papers and 14 textbooks. His focus tends to be dedicated to the advancement of ophthalmology. Foster established the Ocular Immunology and Uveitis Foundation to support relevant research. He is currently a mentor and part-time professor of ophthalmology at Harvard Medical School.

== Education ==
Foster was born and raised in West Virginia. He completed his Bachelor of Science Degree in Chemistry at Duke University in 1965. In 1969 he received his Doctor of Medicine Degree at Duke University Medical Center.

== Career ==
After his fellowship, Foster joined the full-time faculty in the Department of Ophthalmology at Harvard Medical School, serving as the director of the residency training program at MEEI. In 1980, he created its first ocular immunology service, and created the Uveitis and Ocular Immunology Fellowship to train ophthalmologists in 1984.

In 2005, he formed his own eye care facility, Massachusetts Eye Research and Surgery Institution (MERSI), and a foundation, the Ocular Immunology and Uveitis Foundation (OIUF)

Foster developed the "step ladder approach to care" for treating patients with ocular inflammatory disease. This standard of care in treating uveitis/OID was published in July 2015 as the preferred practice patterns in the Journal of Survey of Ophthalmology.

== Awards and achievements ==
Foster has received the American Academy of Ophthalmology Award in 1983, the Research to Prevent Blindness Senior Scientific Investigator Award in 1995, and Mildred Weisenfeld Award for Excellence in Ophthalmology in 2005. He received a lifetime achievement award from the Academy of Ophthalmology in 2007.

In 2016, Foster was named as one of America's top doctors in ophthalmology for the 15th consecutive year.

Foster is a member of the American Ophthalmology Society and American Uveitis Society. As of 2023, his work had been cited over 42,000 times.
