= Francis Foster (comic) =

British comedian

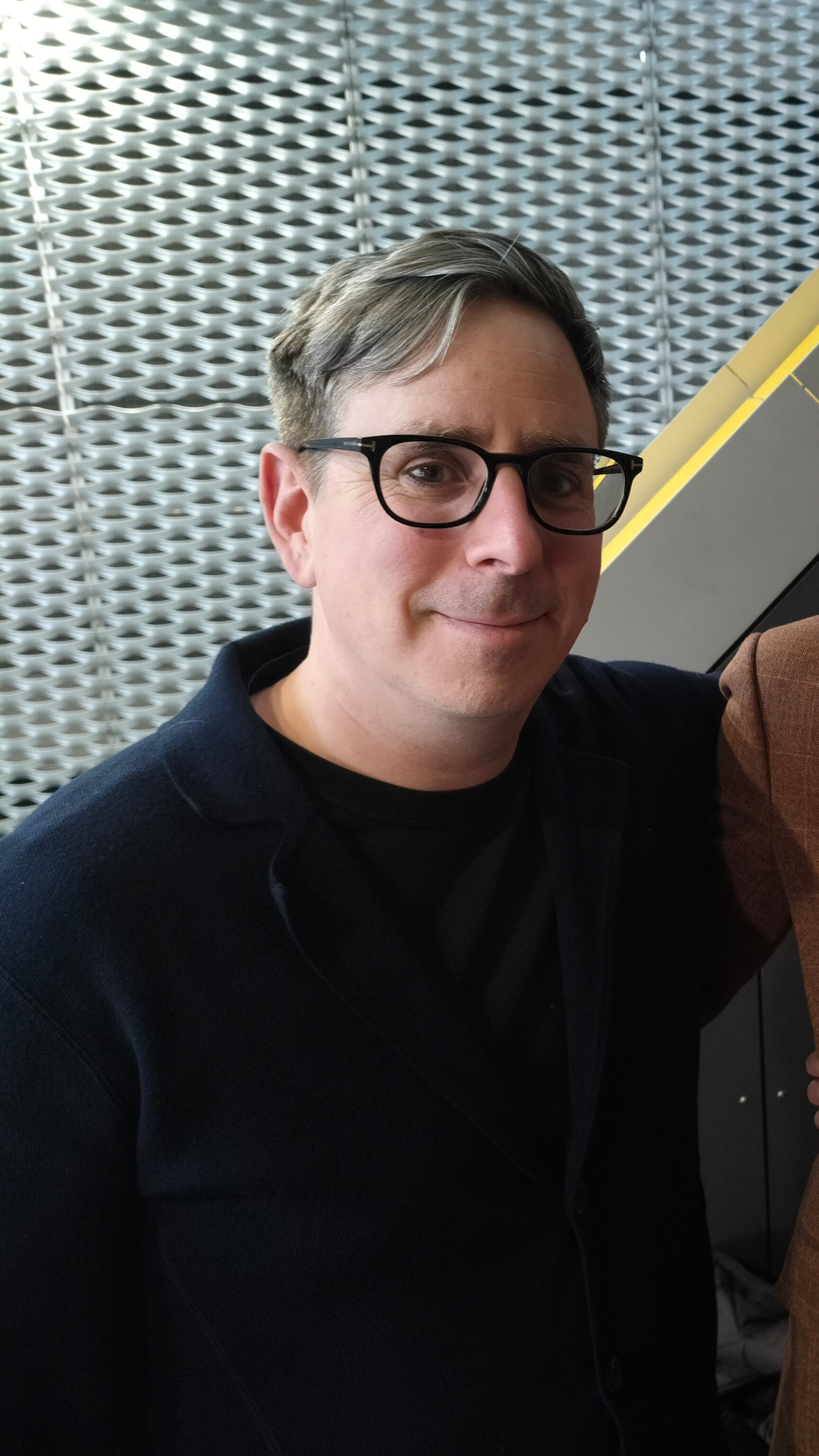
- Foster in 2025
- Born: Francis James Foster; 1 May 1982 (age 44); England
- Education: Royal Central School of Speech and Drama (BA)

Comedy career
- Medium: Stand-up comedy, podcasting, television, writing
- Subjects: Politics, satire, popular culture
- Website: francisfoster.co.uk

Francis Foster is a British author, comedian and podcast host.

Foster was born to a British father and Venezuelan mother and he grew up in both London and Venezuela. His first language was Spanish. He has said that he was diagnosed with severe ADHD as a child and that he still needs to meditate every morning to stay focused.

In his stand-up comedy career Foster has opened for such comedians as Eddie Izzard, Paul Chowdhry and Jeff Garlin. Foster is also a political commentator.

== Triggernometry ==
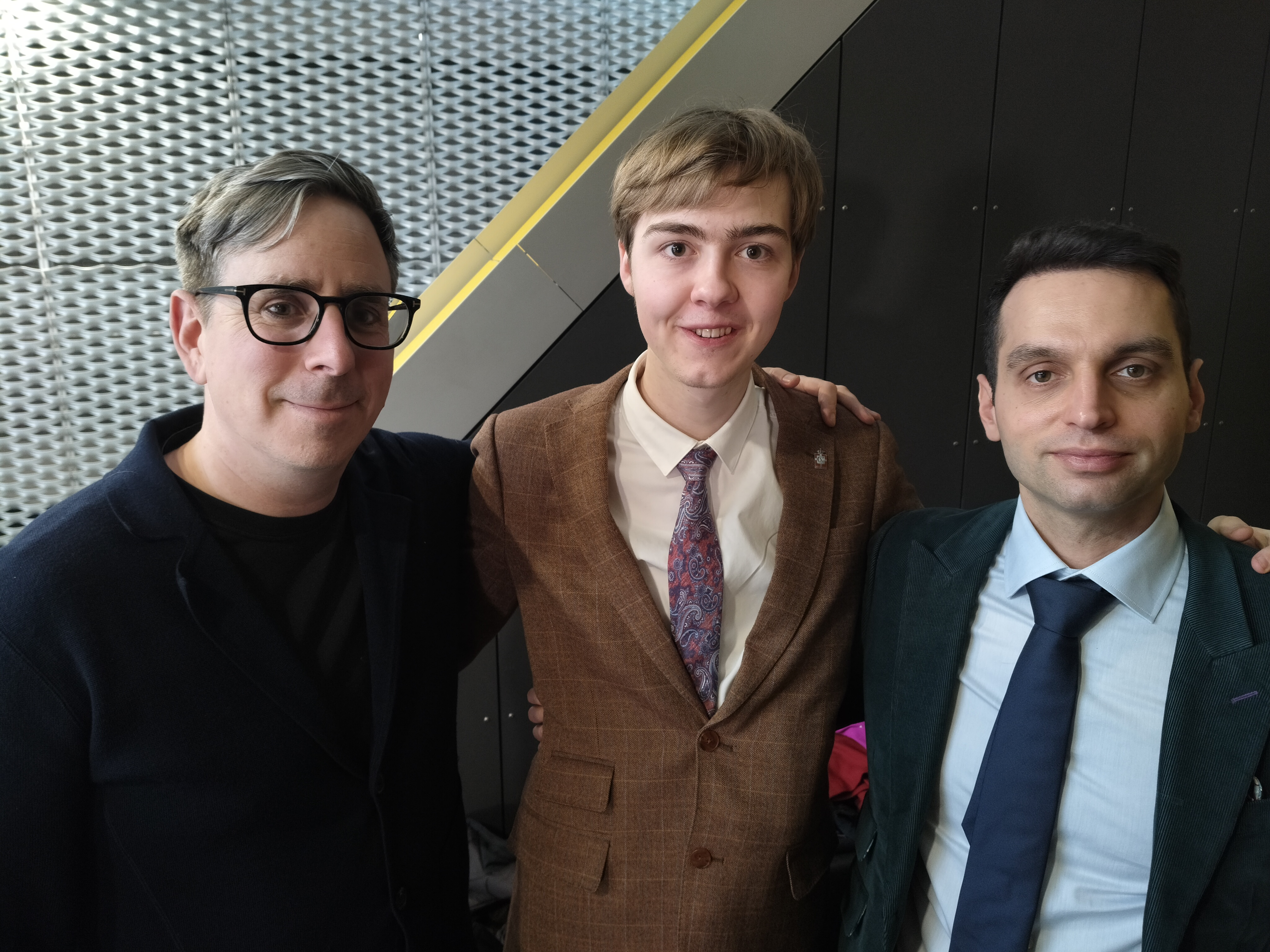
Foster with Konstantin Kisin (to the right) at ARC 2025 in London

Since April 2018, Foster has co-hosted the Triggernometry podcast and YouTube channel with Konstantin Kisin.

== Book ==
In 2025, Hodder & Stoughton published Foster's debut book about his time as a teacher, Classroom Confidential: The truth about being a teacher and why you should never become one.
