= Paulinus Foster =

American politician

Paulinus Mayhew Foster (1811–1861) was an American lawyer and politician from Maine. Foster, a Democrat, served two single year terms in the Maine Senate in 1849 and 1850. In his second year, Foster was elected President of the Maine Senate by his peers.

Foster was born in Readfield, Maine and spent 25 years in Anson, Maine. He retired to Richmond, Maine in 1860 and died a year later.
