= Graeme Foster =

Australian rugby league footballer

Graham Foster
Personal information
- Full name: Graham Foster
- Born: 1967 (age 57–58); Sydney, New South Wales, Australia

Playing information
- Position: Wing, Centre
Club
Years	Team	Pld	T	G	FG	P
1986	Manly Sea Eagles	1	0	0	0	0
1988	Newcastle Knights	1	0	0	0	0
	Total	2	0	0	0	0

Graham Foster (born 1967) is an Australian former professional rugby league footballer who played in the 1980s. He played for the Manly Warringah Sea Eagles in 1986 and the Newcastle Knights in 1988.
