= C. Allen Foster =

American lawyer

- Education: Princeton University (B.A.); Harvard Law School (J.D.); Oxford University (M.A.)
- Occupation: Attorney

C. Allen Foster is a lawyer based in Washington, D.C.

== Education ==
Allen Foster graduated summa cum laude from Princeton University in 1963. He was a Fulbright scholar at Oxford University (Brasenose College), receiving a First Class Honors Degree (B.A.) in Jurisprudence in 1965 and an M.A. in 1971. He received his J.D. degree magna cum laude from Harvard Law School in 1967.

== Professional ==
Allen Foster is the principal author of construction law treatise, Construction and Design Law, and was a senior lecturer at Duke Law School for ten years, teaching trial practice, construction law and commercial arbitration. Foster was a founding partner of the former Greensboro law firm Foster Conner Robson & Gumbiner, known for specializing in litigating disputes involving construction projects. In 1998 the small Greensboro law firm was acquired by then Patton Boggs and Blow a Washington, D.C.–based full-service law firm best known for its lobbying prowess. Foster became a partner with Patton Boggs and Blow from 1988 until 1998. and with Greenberg Traurig LLP from 1998 until 2014. Since May 2014, he has been Senior Counsel at Whiteford, Taylor & Preston LLP and has been listed in Best Lawyers since 2003.

== International Order of St. Hubertus ==
Allen Foster is a Knight Grand Officer in the International Order of St. Hubertus. He is the High Justice of the International Order and served as Chancellor of the USA Chapter from 2014 to 2020. Known as a close friend of Antonin Scalia, Foster travelled on a private jet with the late Supreme Court Justice to Cibolo Creek Ranch, where Scalia was last seen alive. Press reports that the trip was a meeting of the International Order of St. Hubertus were incorrect. Although several members of the Order were present with their wives, Scalia was not a member and the weekend was a social/hunting occasion for admirers of the late Justice. Presidio County, Texas sheriff Danny Dominguez reported that Foster and the other members of the order insisted he had no authority in conducting an investigation of Antonin Scalia's death on February 12, 2016, because that authority was vested in the U.S. Marshals assigned to Justice Scalia.

Party political offices
Preceded by Keith S. Snyder	Republican nominee for Attorney General of North Carolina; 1984	Succeeded by Samuel A. Wilson III
