= Allen Foster =

English footballer (c. 1887–1916)

Personal information
- Full name: Allen Foster
- Date of birth: 1887
- Place of birth: Rawmarsh, England
- Date of death: 8 August 1916 (aged 28–29)
- Place of death: Corbie, France
- Position: Inside left

Senior career*
Years	Team	Apps	(Gls)
- Parkgate Athletic
–1909	Rotherham Town		
1909–1911	Bristol City	13	(1)
1911–1916	Reading	146	(67)
- * Club domestic league appearances and goals

Allen Foster (c. 1887 – 8 August 1916) was an English professional footballer who made over 140 appearances in the Southern League for Reading. An inside left, he also played in the Football League for Bristol City.

== Career ==
Foster was born in Rawmarsh, Yorkshire and began his career in non-League football with Parkgate Athletic and Rotherham Town. He moved to First Division club Bristol City in 1909, but made just 13 appearances, scoring one goal. Foster's prolific scoring for the Bristol City reserve team in the Great Western Suburban League prompted newly promoted Southern League First Division club Reading to sign him for a £75 fee in August 1911. A successful player with Reading, he was remembered for his hat-trick scored against Italian giants AC Milan in the Biscuitmen's 5–0 victory on 13 May 1914. The result prompted the leading Italian newspaper Corriere della Sera to report that "without doubt, Reading FC are the finest foreign team seen in Italy". Foster finished his professional career with Reading with 73 goals.

== Personal life ==
Foster was married and while a footballer with Parkgate Athletic, he worked in the fitter's room at a colliery. In 1914, during the early months of the First World War, Foster enlisted as a private in the Football Battalion of the Middlesex Regiment. On 8 August 1916, he went over the top with the battalion at Guillemont, during the Battle of Delville Wood and was shot in the thigh, abdomen and arm. Foster was recovered by four stretcher-bearers from no man's land and was transported to a hospital in Corbie, where he died of his wounds. He was buried in Corbie Communal Cemetery Extension.

== Honours ==
- Reading Hall of Fame
