= Reuben Foster (politician) =

American politician (1833–1898)

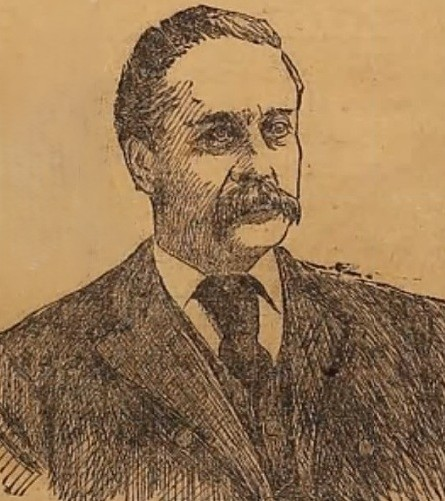
- Foster in an 1898 newspaper illustration

Member of the Maine House of Representatives
- In office 1866–1867

Member of the Maine House of Representatives
- In office 1870

Member of the Maine Senate
- In office 1871–1872

Mayor of Waterville, Maine
- In office 1888–1888
- Preceded by: Position created
- Succeeded by: Nathaniel Meader

Personal details
- Born: February 7, 1833 Bethel, Maine
- Died: October 12, 1898 (aged 65)
- Party: Republican
- Education: Colby College
- Occupation: Lawyer

Reuben Foster (February 7, 1833 – October 12, 1898) was an American politician and lawyer from Maine. Foster, a Republican, served three single-year terms in the Maine House of Representatives (1866-1867; 1870) and two single-year terms in the Maine Senate (1871-1872). In 1870, he was elected House Speaker and in 1872, he was elected Senate President.

In 1888, Waterville was incorporated as a city and elected Reuben Foster as its first mayor.

Foster was born in Bethel, Maine and graduated from Colby College in 1855. He practiced law in Waterville from 1858 until his death in 1898.
