= Forster (surname) =

Forster is a north English surname meaning "forester". It can also be an anglicization of Förster or Foerster, a German surname meaning the same. Some indigenous South Germans independently carry the name Forster, while East Prussian Forsters are descendants of an 18th-century English Forster family.

Notable people with this surname include:

- Forster baronets, several persons

== A ==
- Adam Forster (1848–1928), Australian illustrator and naturalist
- Agnes Forster (d. 1484), British prison reformer
- Alana Forster (born 1986), Australian Paralympic cyclist
- Albert Forster (1902–1952), Nazi Gauleiter of Danzig and war criminal
- Alex Forster (born 1993), Australian rules footballer
- Andrew Forster, Irish Anglican Bishop
- Anna-Lena Forster (born 1995), German para-alpine skier
- Anthony Forster (Australian politician) (1813–1897), Australian politician
- Anthony Forster (political scientist) (born 1964), British political scientist and army officer
- Arnold Forster (attorney) (1915–2010), American attorney
- Arthur Forster (born 1967), British racing driver

== B ==
- Beat Forster (born 1983), Swiss ice hockey player
- Benjamin Forster (antiquary) (1736–1805), English antiquary
- Benjamin Meggot Forster (1768–1829), an English botanist and mycologist
- Bill Forster (footballer), played for Crystal Palace
- Brian Forster (born 1960), a TV actor in The Partridge Family
- B. Y. Forster, the pseudonym of American songwriter George David Weiss

== C ==
- Carl-Peter Forster (born 1954), the President of GM Europe
- Catherine Forster, American paleontologist and taxonomist
- Sir Charles Forster, 1st Baronet (1815–1891), English Liberal politician
- Charles Farrar Forster (1848–1894), English priest
- Charles French Blake-Forster (1851–1874), Irish writer
- Charles Smith Forster (1786–1850), English banker and Conservative politician
- Chloe Forster (born 2003), Australian basketball player
- Clara Forster (1789–1839), German papercutting artist

== D ==
- Danny Forster (born 1977), American architect and TV host
- Debra Forster (born 1961), Australian swimmer
- Derek Forster (1949–2024), English footballer
- Dion Forster (born 1972), South African clergyman
- Donald Forster (1934–1983), Canadian academic

== E ==
- Edward Forster the Elder (1730–1812), English banker and antiquary
- Edward Forster the Younger (1765–1849), English banker and botanist
- E. M. Forster (1879–1970), English novelist

== F ==
- Francis M. Forster (1912–2006), physician and neurologist
- François Forster (1790–1872), French engraver
- Frank Foster (jazz musician) (1928–2011) American musician
- Frank J. Forster (1885–1948) American architect from New York City
- Fraser Forster (born 1988), English footballer
- Friedrich Forster (1895–1958), German dramatist

== G ==
- Georg Forster (1754–1794), German naturalist, ethnologist, and revolutionary
- Georg Forster (composer) (1510–1568), German editor, composer, and physician
- George Forster (murderer) (1701–1803), British murderer
- George Forster (traveller) (1750–1791), English traveller and civil servant
- George H. Forster (1838–1888), American politician
- George J. Forster (1905–1988), American politician
- George Norman Bowes Forster (1872–1918), British Army officer
- Gisela Forster (born 1946), German theologian and writer
- Gordon Forster (1884–1964), Canadian politician
- Grant Forster (born 1961), English cricketer

== H ==
- Hannah Forster (born 1991), English footballer
- Henry Forster, 1st Baron Forster (1866–1936), Governor-General of Australia

== I ==
- Ivy Forster (1907–1997), Jèrrais politician

== J ==
- Jack Forster (born 1987), English rugby union player
- Jackie Forster (1926–1998), English reporter and lesbian rights activist
- Jacob Forster (1739–1806), Prussian mineral collector and mineral dealer
- James Forster (poison pen letter writer) (1934–2017), Convicted English academic
- James William Forster (1784–1861), Irish clergyman
- Jason Forster (born 1971), Wales international rugby union player
- Jean Forster (born 1943), Australian basketball player
- Jill Forster (born 1936), Australian actress
- Johann Forster (1496–1558), German theologian
- Johann Reinhold Forster (1729–1798), German naturalist
- John Forster, 1st Baron Forster of Harraby (1888–1972), British baron
- John Forster (biographer) (1812–1876), English writer and biographer
- John Forster (British Army officer) (born 1856), British Army general
- John Forster (colonial administrator) (died 1748), British colonial administrator
- John Foster (died 1558), English politician
- John Forster (footballer) (born 1948), Australian rules footballer
- John Forster (Irish judge) (1668–1720), Irish lawyer, politician and judge
- John Forster (MP) (1817–1878), British Whig politician
- John Forster (musician) (born 1948), American composer
- John Forster (soldier) (1515–1602), English military commander
- John Cooper Forster (1823–1886), British surgeon
- John Wycliffe Lowes Forster (1850–1938), Canadian artist
- Jordon Forster (born 1993), Scottish footballer
- Josef Forster (composer) (1838–1917), Austrian composer
- Josiah Forster (1782–1870), English teacher and philanthropist
- Juan Forster (1814–1882), English-born Californio ranchero and merchant

== K ==
- Kaye Forster (born 1980), English weather presenter
- Kevin Forster (born 1958), English long-distance runner
- Kurt W. Forster (1935–2024), Swiss architectural historian

== L ==
- Lars Forster (born 1993), Swiss cyclist and mountain biker
- Laura Forster (1858–1917), Australian nurse, physician and surgeon
- Leah Forster, American comedian
- Leonard Wilson Forster (1913–1997), British professor of German
- Les Forster (1915–1986), English footballer
- Lyn Forster (1925–2009), New Zealand arachnologist

== M ==
- Marc Forster (born 1969), German-Swiss film director
- Marc R. Forster (born 1959), American historian
- Margaret Forster (1938–2016), English novelist and biographer
- Mark Forster (author) (1943–2025), British author
- Mark Forster (footballer) (born 1964), English footballer
- Mark Forster (rugby league) (born 1964), Great Britain and Ireland international rugby league footballer
- Mark Forster (singer) (born 1983), German singer
- Markus Forster (born 1901), German opera singer
- Martin Onslow Forster (1872–1945), British chemist
- Mary Forster (1853–1885), British watercolour painter
- Mary Forster (Quaker) (1619–1687), English religious writer
- Matt Forster (1900–1976), English footballer
- Matthew Forster (1785–1869), British politician and merchant
- Max Forster (born 1934), Swiss bobsledder
- Maximilian Forster (born 1990), German professional ice hockey player
- Michael Forster (artist) (1907–2002), Canadian abstract painter
- Michael N. Forster (born 1957), American philosopher
- Michelanne Forster (born 1953), New Zealand playwright and scriptwriter

== N ==
- Neil Milward Forster (1927–2006), British field hockey player
- Nick Forster, founder of eTown radio program
- Nicky Forster (born 1973), English footballer
- Norvela Forster (1931–1993), English businesswoman

== O ==
- Oliver Forster (1925–1999), British diplomat
- Otto Forster (born 1937), German mathematician

== P ==
- Peter Forster (actor) (1920–1982), British film and television actor
- Peter Forster (bishop) (born 1950), British Anglican bishop
- Peter Forster (geneticist) (born 1967), British geneticist

== R ==
- Ray Forster (1922–2000), New Zealand arachnologist
- Richard Forster (physician) (c.1546–1616), English physician
- Richard Forster (photographer) (born 1940), Swiss photographer
- Robert Forster (1941–2019), American actor
- Robert Forster (musician) (born 1957), Australian musician, member of The Go-Betweens
- Roger T. Forster (born 1933), theologian and leader of Ichthus Christian Fellowship

== S ==
- Sam Forster (born 1996), Canadian American writer
- Sarah Forster (born 1993), Swiss ice hockey player
- Scott Forster (born 1971), American baseball player
- Shane Forster (born 1972), Northern Ireland Anglican priest
- Stefan Forster (born 1971), German rower
- Stu Forster (born 1969), Rugby player
- Stuart Forster (born 1975), Photographer and writer
- Susanna Dorothy (Forster) Dixon (1757–1822), author and translator

== T ==
- Terry Forster (born 1952), American baseball player
- Therese Forster (1786–1862), German educator
- Thomas Forster (1683–1738), British politician and Jacobite leader
- Thomas Forster (1659–1725), English politician
- Thomas Forster (artist) (1676/7–after 1712), English portrait draughtsman
- Thomas Forster (dancer) (born 1986), English ballet dancer
- Thomas Forster (Lincoln MP) (fl. 1406–1415), English politician
- Thomas Forster (mathematician) (born 1948), British set theorist and philosopher
- Thomas Emerson Forster (1802–1875), English mining engineer
- Thomas Furly Forster (1761–1825), English botanist
- Thomas Ignatius Maria Forster (1789–1860), English astronomer, physician, naturalist and philosopher
- Tim Forster (1934–1999), English racehorse trainer
- Tom Forster (baseball) (1859–1946), American baseball player
- Tom Forster (coach), American gymnastics coach

== V ==
- Vicky Forster, British biologist
- Victor Forster (1917–2009), Irish Anglican priest
- Viktória Forster (born 2002), Slovak athlete

== W ==
- Wade Forster (born 1998), Australian country musician
- Walter Forster (actor) (1917–1996), Brazilian actor
- Walter Forster (entomologist) (1910–1986), German entomologist
- Walter Forster (screenwriter) (1900–1968), Austrian screenwriter
- Westgarth Forster (1772–1835), British geologist
- Will Forster (born 1986), British politician
- William Forster (Australian politician) (1818–1882), Australian politician
- William Forster (bishop), Anglican Bishop of Sodor and Man from 1633 to 1635
- William Forster (British Army officer) (1798–1879), British Army officer
- William Forster (cricketer) (1884–1930), Australian cricketer
- William Forster (MP for Berkshire) (died 1574), English politician and sheriff of Berkshire
- William Forster (judge) (1921–1997), Australian judge
- William Forster (mathematician) (fl. 1630–1673), English mathematician
- William Forster (philanthropist) (1784–1854), English Quaker
- William Forster (priest) (1760–1823), Irish dean of Kilmacduagh
- William Edward Forster (1818–1886), British politician and businessman
- William H. Forster (born 1939), American Army general
- William Mark Forster (1846–1921), Australian philanthropist
- William Thomas Forster (1857–1938), Canadian politician
- Winnie Forster (born 1969), German journalist

== See also ==
- Forster (disambiguation)
- Forester (disambiguation)
- Forrester (surname)
- Förster
- Foster (disambiguation)
- Fosters (disambiguation)
- Vorster
