= Förster =

Förster or Foerster is a German surname meaning "forester". (It has often been Anglicised as Forster). Notable people of this name include:

== Förster ==
- Alban Förster (1849–1916), German composer
- Arnold Förster (1810–1884), German entomologist
- August Förster (physician) (1822–1865), German anatomist
- Auguste Förster (1848–1926), German educationalist and feminist
- Benjamin Förster (born 1989), German footballer
- Bernd Förster (born 1956), German footballer
- Bernhard Förster (1843–1889), German teacher and antisemitic activist
- Carl Friedrich Richard Förster (1825–1902), German ophthalmologist
- Christoph Förster (1693–1745), German composer
- Christopher Förster (born 1986), German politician
- Eckart Förster (born 1952), German philosopher
- Emanuel Aloys Förster (1748–1823), Prussian composer and music teacher
- Ernst Joachim Förster (1800–1885), German painter and art critic
- Franz Förster (1819–1878), German jurist (1819-1878)
- Friedrich Förster (1865–1918), Soft redirect to Wikispecies
- Friedrich August Förster (1829–1897), German piano maker
- Friedrich Christoph Förster (1791–1868), German historian and poet
- Heiko Mathias Förster (born 1966), German conductor
- Heinrich Förster (1799–1881), German prince-bishop
- Helmuth Förster (1889–1965), German general and Knight's Cross recipient
- Horst Förster (conductor, 1920) (1920–1986), German conductor and violinist
- Horst Förster (conductor, 1933) (born 1933), German conductor and musicologist
- Jochen Förster (born 1942), German canoeist
- Jürgen Förster (born 1940), German historian
- Karl Förster (1784–1841), German poet and translator
- Karlheinz Förster (born 1958), German footballer
- Kaspar Förster (1616–1673), German singer and composer
- Katharina Förster (born 1988), German freestyle skier
- Kerstin Förster (born 1965), German rower
- Klaus Förster (1933–2009), German tax inspector
- Ludwig Förster (1797–1863), Austrian architect
- Marco Förster (born 1976), German footballer
- Martin Förster (born 1966), Czech luger
- Max Förster (1869–1954), German scholar of Old English
- Olaf Förster (born 1962), East German rower
- Otto-Wilhelm Förster (1885–1966), German general
- Philipp Förster (born 1995), German footballer
- Robert Förster (born 1978), German cyclist
- Stefan Förster (born 1950), East German boxer
- Theodor Förster (1910–1974), German physical chemist
- Till Förster (born 1955), German professor
- Trudy Larkin Förster (1935–2005), American writer
- Wendelin Förster (1844–1915), Austrian philologist and Romance scholar
- Wieland Förster (born 1930), German sculptor and painter

== Foerster ==
- Alma E. Foerster (1885–1967), American nurse
- Anna Foerster (born 1971), American film director
- Chris Foerster (born 1961), American football coach
- Dietlind Foerster (born 1981), Namibian cricketer
- Friedrich Wilhelm Foerster (1869–1966), German academic, philosopher, editor and pacifist
- Hans Foerster (born 1965), American swimmer
- Heinz von Foerster (1911–2002), Austrian-American scientist and cybernetician
- Jennifer Foerster (born 1979), Native American poet from California
- Josef Bohuslav Foerster (1859–1951), Czech composer and musicologist
- Karl Foerster (1874–1970), German author and gardener
- Madeline von Foerster (born 1973), American painter
- Otfrid Foerster (1873–1941), German neurologist and neurosurgeon
- Paul Foerster (born 1963), American sailor
- Peter Foerster (1887–1948), German painter
- Richard Foerster (classical scholar) (1843–1922), German classical scholar
- Richard Foerster (poet) (born 1949), American poet
- Ryan Foerster (born 1983), Canadian visual artist
- Tom Foerster (1928–2000), American politician
- Tyson Foerster (born 2002), Canadian ice hockey player
- Viktor Foerster (1867–1915), Czech painter
- Werner von Foerster (born 1897), Argentine sailor
- Wilhelm Julius Foerster (1832–1921), German astronomer
- Willy Rudolf Foerster (1905–1966), Engineer and Industrialist
- Wolfgang Foerster (1875–1963), German officer and military historian

== See also ==
- Forester (disambiguation)
- Forrester (surname)
- Forster (surname)
- Foster (disambiguation)
- Fosters (disambiguation)
- Vorster
