= Foster =

Foster may refer to:

== People ==
- Foster (surname)
- Foster Brooks (1912–2001), American actor
- Foster Moreau (born 1997), American football player
- Foster Sarell (born 1998), American football player
- John Foster Dulles (1888–1959), American diplomat and politician
- Sterling Foster Black (1924–1996), American lawyer
- Caroline E. Foster, New Zealand law professor
- Jodie Foster (born 1962), American actor

== Places ==
Australia

- Foster, Victoria

Canada

- Foster, Quebec, a village, now part of the town of Brome Lake

United Kingdom

- Foster Mill, in Cambridge, England

United States

- Foster (CTA), elevated transit station in Evanston, Illinois, USA
- Foster, California (disambiguation)
  - Foster, San Diego County, California
- Foster, Indiana
- Foster, Kentucky
- Foster, Washtenaw County, Michigan
- Foster, Minnesota
- Foster, Missouri
- Foster, Nebraska
- Foster, Oklahoma
- Foster, Oregon
- Foster, Rhode Island
- Foster Township, Michigan
- Foster, Wisconsin (disambiguation)
  - Foster, Clark County, Wisconsin, a town
  - Foster, Eau Claire County, Wisconsin, an unincorporated community
- Foster City, California
- Foster Township (disambiguation)

== Child care ==
- Foster care, the modern system of placing children in state custody in the homes of temporary caregivers
- Fosterage, the sometimes historical practice of children being raised by families not their own

== Arts, entertainment, and media ==
=== Fictional characters ===
- Foster, a dog on General Hospital from 1994 to 1998
- Foster, one of The Fuzzpaws, puppets on the Canadian channel YTV
- Court Foster, a character in the film The Man in the Moon (1991)
- Madame Foster and Francis "Frankie" Foster, recurring characters of the animated show Foster's Home for Imaginary Friends. The latter being the former's granddaughter

=== Literature ===
- "Foster" (short story), by Claire Keegan, 2010
- Ellen Foster, 1987 novel by American author Kaye Gibbons

=== Other art, entertainment, and media ===
- Foster (film), a 2011 British comedy-drama film written and directed by Jonathan Newman
- Foster the People, an American rock band named after its lead singer Mark Foster
- Foster's Home for Imaginary Friends, animated television series

== Brands and companies ==
- Foster and Partners, an architectural firm
- Foster, Rastrick and Company, British steam locomotive manufacturer
- Foster's Group, Australian beer producer
  - Foster's Lager
- William Foster & Co., British agricultural machinery company

== Science and technology ==
- Foster's reactance theorem, theorem in electrical engineering
- Foster's rule (island rule), principle in evolutionary biology
- Foster's theorem, theorem in probability theory
- Foster, a 6-row malting barley variety
- Foster (crater), a small lunar impact crater on the far side of the Moon
- Fostering (falconry), bird breeding technique for its introduction into nature

== Food ==
- Bananas Foster, a dessert of bananas and vanilla ice cream, with a caramelized liquor-based sauce.

== See also ==
- Foster Island (disambiguation)
- Fosters (disambiguation)
- Forster (disambiguation)
- Justice Foster (disambiguation)
