= Forester (surname) =

Forester is a surname. Notable people with the surname include:

- Cecil Forester (disambiguation), several people
- Forester Sisters, an American country music vocal group
- John Forester (disambiguation), several people
- Nicole Forester (born 1972), American actress
- Forester Augustus Obeysekera (1880-1961), Sri Lankan Sinhala legislator

== Fictional ==
- Dean Forester, a character in the Gilmore Girls television series
- Katie Forester, a character from Yo-kai Watch series
- Julie Forester, a character from Piranha 3D

== See also ==
- Forrester (surname)
