= Mark Forster =

Mark Forster may refer to:

- Mark Forster (author) (1943–2025), British author
- Mark Forster (footballer) (born 1964), English footballer
- Mark Forster (rugby league) (born 1964), rugby league footballer
- Mark Forster (singer) (born 1983), German singer

== See also ==
- Marc Forster (born 1969), German-Swiss filmmaker and screenwriter
- Marc R. Forster (born 1959), American historian
- Mark Foster (disambiguation)
