= Nathaniel Bland (priest) =

Irish Anglican priest

Nathaniel Bland (1809 - 1885) was Archdeacon of Aghadoe from 1861 until his death on 25 February 1885. A graduate of Trinity College, Dublin, he held curacies at Templenoe and Kilcrohane. He was the incumbent at Knockane from 1851 to 1861; and then of Aghadoe until 1875.

Church of Ireland titles
Preceded by James William Forster	Archdeacon of Aghadoe; 1861–1885	Succeeded by George Robert Wynne
