= Battle of the Menin Road Ridge =

Battle during WW1

- Part of the Third Battle of Ypres
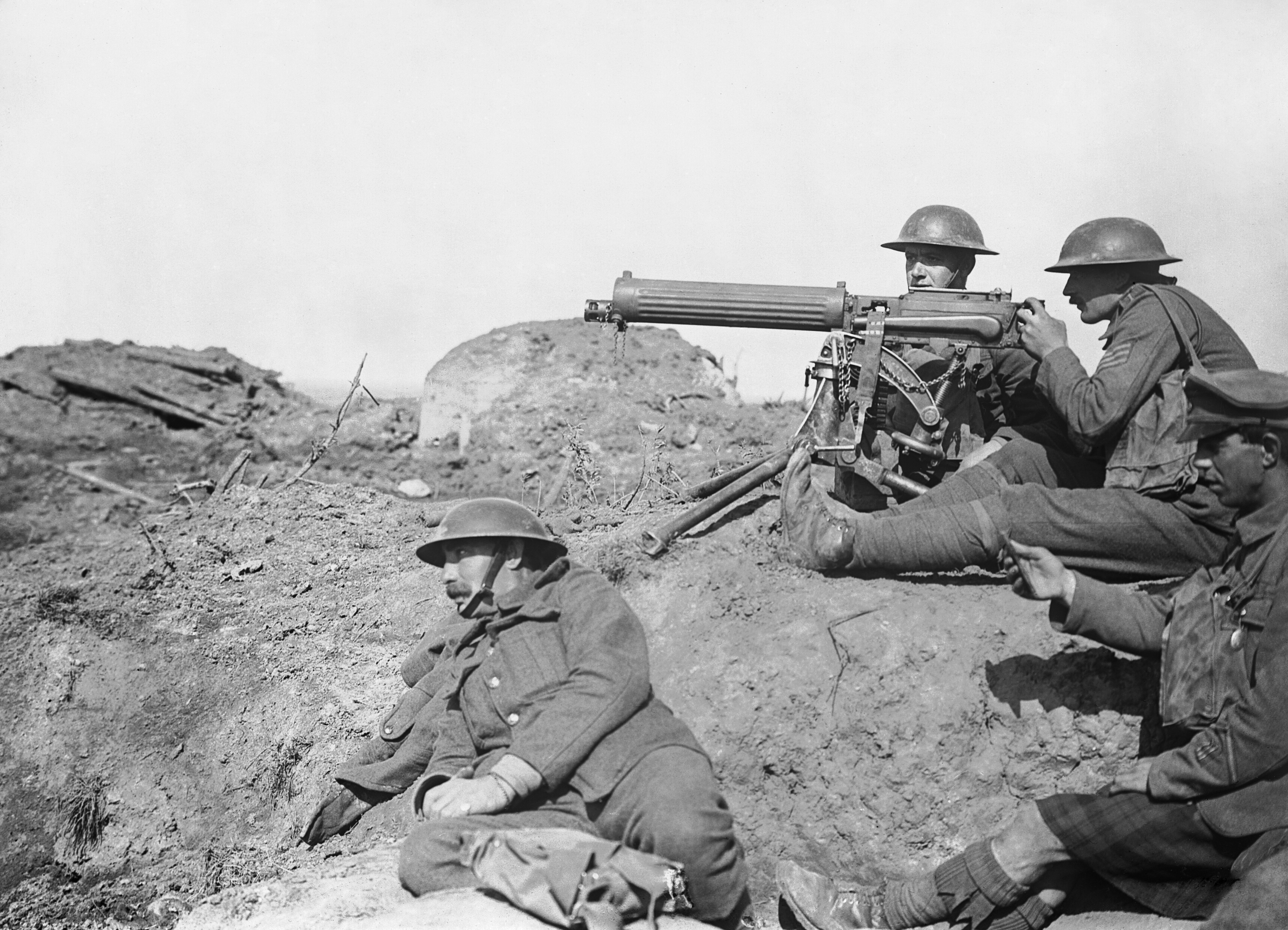
- A British Vickers machine gun crew during the battle
| Date | 20–25 September 1917 |
| Location | Ypres Salient, West Flanders, Belgium 50°54′01″N 03°01′00″E |
| Result | British victory |

Belligerents
| British Empire; United Kingdom; Australia; South Africa | Germany |

Commanders and leaders
| Douglas Haig; Herbert Plumer; Hubert Gough | Erich Ludendorff; Prince Rupprecht; Friedrich Sixt von Armin |

Units involved
| Second Army; Fifth Army | 4th Army |

Strength
| 11 divisions | 5 divisions |

Casualties and losses
| 20,255 | 25,000; 3,243 (POW) |
- The Menin road, between Ypres and Menin

The Battle of the Menin Road Ridge, sometimes called "Battle of the Menin Road", was the third British general attack of the Third Battle of Ypres in the First World War. The battle took place from 20 to 25 September 1917, in the Ypres Salient in Belgium on the Western Front. During the pause in British and French general attacks from late August to 20 September, the British changed some infantry tactics, adopting the leap-frog method of advance.

Waves of infantry stopped once they reached their objective and consolidated the ground, while supporting waves passed through the objective to attack the next one and the earlier waves became the tactical reserve. General adoption of the method was made possible when more artillery was brought into the salient, by increasing the number of aircraft involved in close air support and by the Royal Flying Corps giving the tasks of air defence, contact-patrol, counter-attack patrol, artillery observation and ground-attack to particular aircraft.

In early September, optimism increased among German commanders that the Flanders offensive had been defeated and several divisions and air units were transferred elsewhere. Drier weather and extensive road repairs made it much easier for the British to move vast amounts of supplies forward from the original front line. Visibility increased except for frequent ground fog around dawn, which helped conceal British infantry during the attack, before clearing to expose German preparations for counter-attacks to British observation and attack.

The British infantry succeeded in capturing most of their objectives and then holding them against German counter-attacks, inflicting many casualties on the German defenders and Eingreifdivisionen, sent to reinforce them, by massed artillery and small-arms fire. German defences on the Gheluvelt Plateau, which had been retained or quickly recaptured in July and August were lost and the British began a run of success which lasted into early October.

== Background ==
=== Strategic background ===
The Kerensky Offensive by Russia in July had accelerated the disintegration of the Russian Army, increasing the prospect of substantial German reinforcements for the Western Front. The French attack at Verdun in August had inflicted a defeat on the German 5th Army similar in extent to the defeat of the 4th Army in the Battle of Messines in June but morale in the French army was still poor. In reports to the War Cabinet on 21 August and 2 September, Sir Douglas Haig repeated his view that the British campaign at Ypres was necessary to shield the other armies of the alliance, regardless of the slow geographical progress being made in the unusually wet weather of August.

=== Tactical developments ===
Allied divisions engaged at Ypres 31 July – 31 August 1917
| II Corps | XIX Corps | XVIII Corps | XIV Corps | French |
|---|---|---|---|---|
| 24th | 15th | 39th | 38th | 1st |
| 30th | 55th | 51st | Guards | 2nd |
| 8th | 16th | 48th | 20th | 51st |
| 18th | 36th | 11th | 29th | 162nd |
| 25th | 61st | — | — | — |
| 14th | — | — | — | — |
| 47th | — | — | — | — |
| 56th | — | — | — | — |

The German 4th Army had defeated British attacks on the black and green (second and third) lines set for 31 July, in the centre and on the Gheluvelt Plateau on the southern flank of the battlefield during the frequent weather interruptions in August. These defensive successes had been costly and by mid-August, German satisfaction at their achievements was accompanied by concern at the extent of the casualties. The rain, constant bombardments and British air attacks had also put great strain on the German defenders between British attacks. After 31 July, Gough had ceased attempts to exploit opportunities created by Fifth Army attacks and began a process of tactical revision, which with the better weather in September, inflicted several costly defeats on the Germans. (Note: The information given in the Official History (1991 [1948]) demonstrated that far from neglecting Haig's desire to concentrate on the Gheluvelt plateau, Gough had put a disproportionate amount of the Fifth Army artillery at the disposal of II Corps (43 per cent). II Corps had five divisions, with 3 1/3 being engaged on 31 July; the other corps had four divisions each, with two being used in the attack and two in reserve. The green line for II Corps varied from a depth of 1,000 yd (910 m) on the southern flank at Klein Zillibeke, to 2,500 yd (1.4 mi; 2.3 km) on the northern flank along the Ypres–Roulers railway.)

The capture of the green line from the southern flank of XIX Corps to the northern flank of XIV Corps, required an advance of 2,500–3,500 yd (1.4–2.0 mi; 2.3–3.2 km). An advance of 5,000 yd (2.8 mi; 4.6 km) to the red line was not fundamental to the plan and discretion to attempt advances towards it was left with the divisional commanders, based on the extent of local German resistance, in accordance with the manual SS 135 (December 1916), which laid down the means by which divisions would organise attacks. Had the German defence collapsed and the red line been reached, the Fifth Army would still have to attack Flandern I-, II- and III- stellungen except for Flandern I Stellung for a mile south of Broodseinde. On 10 August, II Corps attacked to reach the black line of 31 July, an advance of 400–900 yd (370–820 m) and at the Battle of Langemarck on 16 August, the Fifth Army objective was the green line 1,500 yd (1,400 m) distant.

II Corps had been ordered to capture the rest of the black line on 2 August. The three corps of the Fifth Army to the north were then to complete the capture of their part of the green line on 4 August, while XIV Corps and the French First Army crossed the Steenbeek on the left flank. The unusually wet weather caused the attacks to be postponed until 10 August and 16–18 August, the Battle of Langemarck. Some objectives were still occupied by the Germans after operations later in the month. Principal responsibility for the offensive was transferred to General Herbert Plumer on 25 August. The Second Army boundary was shifted north into the area vacated by II Corps on the Gheluvelt plateau. Haig put more emphasis on the southern fringe of the plateau, by giving to the Second Army the bulk of the heavy artillery reinforcements moved from Artois.

== Prelude ==
=== British preparations ===
Weather 1–20 September 1917
| Date | Rain mm | °F | |
|---|---|---|---|
| 1 | 0.2 | 59 | dull |
| 2 | 1.1 | 63 | dull |
| 3 | 0.0 | 69 | fine |
| 4 | 0.0 | 71 | fine |
| 5 | 5.1 | 74 | fine |
| 6 | 24.6 | 77 | dull |
| 7 | 0.1 | 72 | dull |
| 8 | 0.0 | 72 | fog |
| 9 | 0.0 | 71 | fog |
| 10 | 0.0 | 66 | fine |
| 11 | 0.0 | 71 | fine |
| 12 | 0.0 | 62 | dull |
| 13 | 1.7 | 61 | — |
| 14 | 0.4 | 66 | dull |
| 15 | 0.1 | 67 | dull |
| 16 | 0.0 | 73 | dull |
| 17 | 0.0 | 67 | dull |
| 18 | 0.4 | 65 | fine |
| 19 | 5.1 | 72 | fine |
| 20 | 0.0 | 66 | dull |

The staff of General Headquarters (GHQ) of the British Expeditionary Force (BEF) quickly studied the results of the attack of 31 July and on 7 August sent questionnaires to the army headquarters about the new conditions produced by German defence-in-depth. The 4th Army had spread strong points and pillboxes in the areas between their defensive lines and made rapid counter-attacks with local reserves and Eingreif divisions, against Allied penetrations. (Note: Shelford Bidwell and Dominick Graham wrote that Plumer had described the new German system after the Battle of Messines and this lay behind the reservations of Major-General John Davidson, the BEF Director of Military Operations, over the plan for 31 July.) Plumer issued a preliminary order on 1 September, which defined the Second Army area of operations as Broodseinde and the area southwards. The plan was based on the use of much more medium and heavy artillery, which had been brought to the Gheluvelt Plateau from VIII Corps on the right of the Second Army and by transferring more guns from the Third Army and Fourth Army in Artois and Picardy.

The 112 heavy and 210 field guns and howitzers in the Second Army on 31 July, were increased to 575 heavy and medium and 720 field guns and howitzers. The extra artillery was to destroy German concrete shelters and machine-gun nests, more numerous in German "battle zones", than the "outpost zones" which had been captured in July and August and to engage in more counter-battery fire. The new guns allowed the equivalent to one artillery piece for every 5 ft (1.5 m) of the attack front, more than double the density in the Battle of Pilckem Ridge. Few German concrete pill-boxes and machine gun nests had been destroyed during earlier preparatory bombardments and attempts at precision bombardment between attacks had also failed.

The tactical refinements of the Second Army sought to undermine the German defence by making a shallower penetration and then fighting the principal battle against German counter-attack (Eingreif) divisions. By further reorganising infantry reserves, Plumer ensured that the depth of the attacking divisions roughly corresponded to the depth of local German counter-attack reserves and their Eingreifdivisionen. More infantry was provided for the later stages of the advance to defeat German counter-attacks, by an infantry advance of no more than 1,500 yd (1,400 m) before consolidating. When the Germans counter-attacked they would encounter a British defence-in-depth, protected by artillery and suffer heavy casualties to little effect, rather than the small and disorganised groups of British infantry that the Germans had driven back to the black line on the XIX Corps front on 31 July.

==== Minor operations ====
During the lull in early September, both sides tried to improve their positions; on 1 September, a determined German attack at Inverness Copse was repulsed. Further north in the XIX Corps area, a battalion of the 61st (2nd South Midland) Division rushed Hill 35 but only took a small area; another attempt on 3 September failed. Next day, the division attacked Aisne Farm and was repulsed but the neighbouring 58th (2/1st London) Division took Spot Farm. On 5 September, the 61st (2nd South Midland) Division tried again at night, took a German outpost on Hill 35 and then lost it to a counter-attack. An attack from south of Hill 35 by the 42nd (East Lancashire) Division with the 125th Brigade and part of the 127th Brigade took place on 6 September. For several days, practice barrages were conducted and a daylight reconnaissance by a small party probed to within 25 yd (23 m) of Beck House. During the night, the Germans sent up many flares and rockets, disclosing their barrage line and many undetected posts.

The British barrage schedule had required four rounds per-gun-per-minute but the gunners fired up to ten. The 125th Brigade attacked Iberian, Borry and Beck House farms and captured Beck House but small-arms fire from Hill 35 stopped the rest of the attack, which was a costly failure. The Germans retook Beck House at 10.45 a.m. and enfiladed the rest of the attackers, who were withdrawn, except on the extreme right. Another German counter-attack at 7.30 p.m. by fresh storm-troops, forced the battalion to retire, except from a small area 150 yd (140 m) forward, which was abandoned next day; the division suffered c. 800 casualties. Another night attack by the 61st (2nd South Midland) Division on Hill 35 failed and in the XVIII Corps area, a company of the 51st (Highland) Division made an abortive raid on Pheasant Trench.

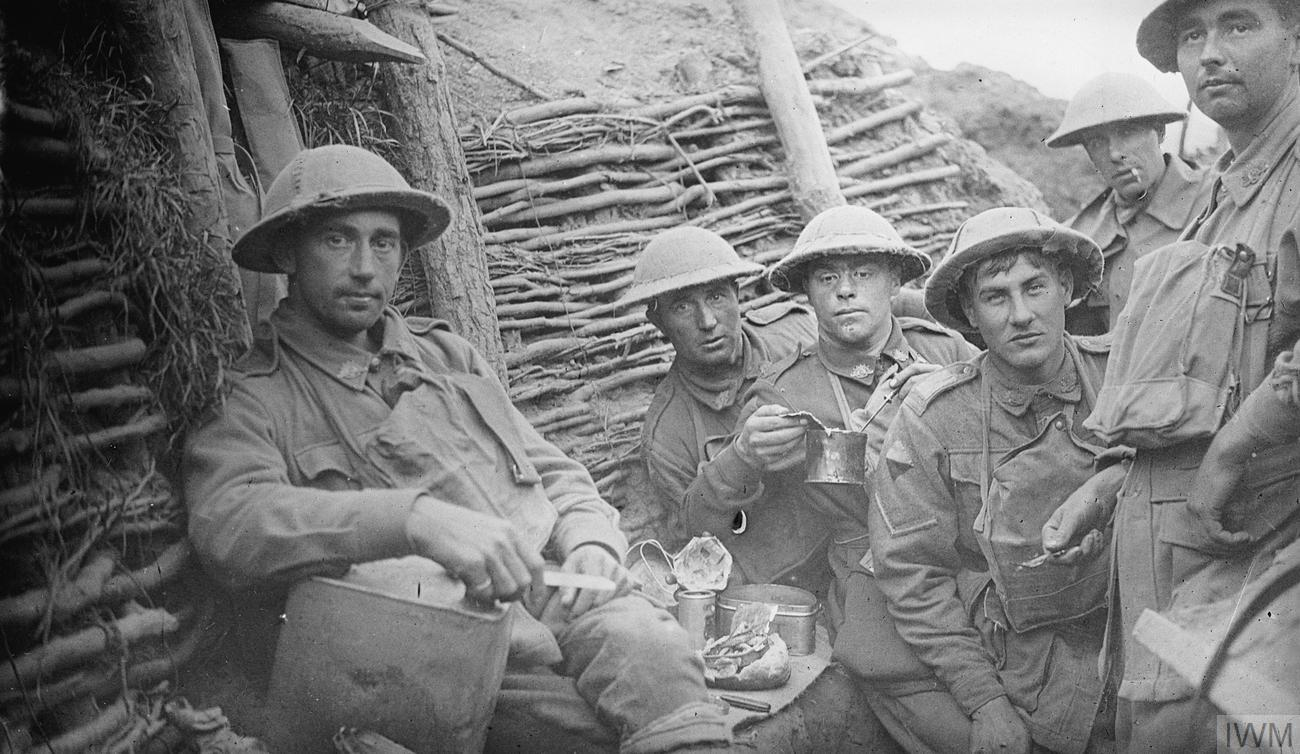
An Australian Battalion have tea and food in the first support trench on the evening before the battle on Westhoek Ridge, 19 September 1917

Two battalions of the 58th (2/1st London) Division conducted raids on 8 September and next day the 24th Division withstood another determined German attack at Inverness Copse. On 11 September, a night attack by a battalion of the 42nd (East Lancashire) Division failed to capture The Hut. A covering party for a group of soldiers working in no man's land, discovered an Inniskilling Fusilier, who had lain wounded since 11 August, subsisting on rations recovered from dead soldiers. On 13 September, the Guards Division was pushed back from the far side of the Broembeek and the Wijdendreft road. Next day a battalion of the 42nd (East Lancashire) Division edged forward 100 yd (91 m) and a battalion of the 58th (2/1st London) Division attacked the Winnipeg pillbox; in the evening a German counter-attack took ground towards Springfield.

On 15 September, covered by a hurricane bombardment, a battalion of the 47th (1/2nd London) Division attacked and captured a strong point near Inverness Copse, fire from which had devastated earlier attacks and took 36 prisoners. A battalion of the 42nd (East Lancashire) Division captured Sans Souci and the 51st (Highland) Division launched a "Chinese" attack using dummies. A day later, a German attack on the strong point renamed Cryer Farm, captured by the 47th (1/2nd London) Division was a costly failure and in the XIV Corps area, another attack was stopped by small-arms fire by the 20th (Light) Division. A party of the Guards Division was cut off near Ney Copse and fought its way out; a lull followed until 20 September.

=== British plan ===
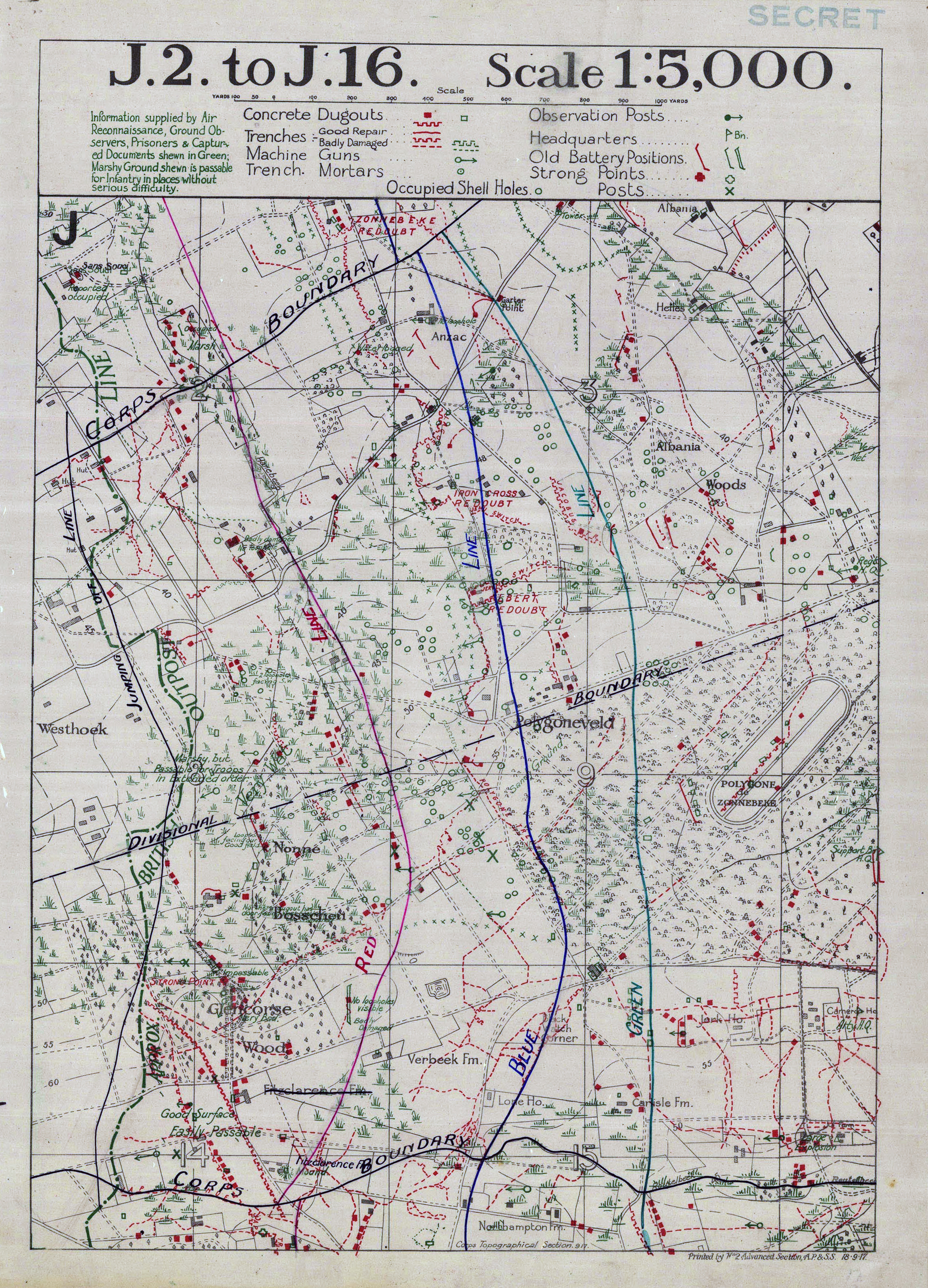
Map showing British objective lines on the Gheluvelt Plateau

Plumer planned to capture Gheluvelt Plateau in four steps at six-day intervals, for time to bring forward artillery and supplies, a faster tempo of operations than that envisaged by Gough before 31 July. Each step was to have even more limited geographical objectives, with infantry units attacking on narrower fronts in greater depth. The practice of attacking the first objective with two battalions and the following objectives with a battalion each was reversed, in view of the greater density of German defences the further the attack penetrated; double the medium and heavy artillery was available than for on 31 July. Reorganisation in this manner had been recommended in a report of 25 August, by the Fifth Army General Officer Commanding RA (GOCRA), Major-General Herbert Uniacke. The evolution in organisation and method was to ensure that more infantry were on tactically advantageous ground, having had time to consolidate and regain contact with their artillery before German counter-attacks.

The British began a "desultory" bombardment on 31 August and also sought to neutralise the German artillery with gas, including gas bombardments on the three evenings before the assault. Aircraft were reserved for systematic counter-attack reconnaissance, to avoid the failures of previous battles, where too few aircraft had been burdened with too many duties, in bad weather. The three-week pause originated from lieutenant-generals Thomas Morland and William Birdwood, the X and I Anzac corps commanders, at a conference of 27 August. The attacking corps made their plans within the framework of the Second Army plan, using General Principles on Which the Artillery Plan Will be Drawn of 29 August, which described the multi-layered creeping barrage and the use of Fuze 106, to avoid adding more craters to the ground. The Second Army and both corps did visibility tests to decide when zero hour should be set; the use of wireless and gun-carrying tanks, were discussed with Plumer on 15 September. X Corps issued its first Instruction on 1 September, giving times and boundaries to its divisions.

A pattern for British attacks was established and Second Army orders and artillery instructions became routine, with an Attack Map showing stages of attack and timetable for the corps involved; corps moves and the time of attack were briefly noted. Nine divisions were to attack on a 10,000 yd (5.7 mi; 9.1 km) front; the Second Army had three times and the Fifth Army twice the ammunition than for Pilckem Ridge. In late August, destructive fire by super-heavy artillery began and counter-battery fire commenced in early September, in poor visibility. The RFC plan incorporated standardised methods used by battery commanders and artillery observation crews, as informal liaison methods had been found to be insufficient with the increase in the amount of artillery and the number of aircraft in the BEF since 1915. Wireless codes were harmonised and better training introduced for air–ground liaison. Attacks were to be made on German billets, railways, aerodromes and infantry counter-attacks. The Royal Flying Corps (RFC) contributed 26 squadrons, including the two night-bombing squadrons and the Royal Naval Air Service (RNAS) Handley-Pages from Coudekerque, beginning the night before the attack. After dawn, aerodromes were periodically to be attacked by small formations of low-flying fighters and by day bombers from high-altitude.

=== German preparations ===
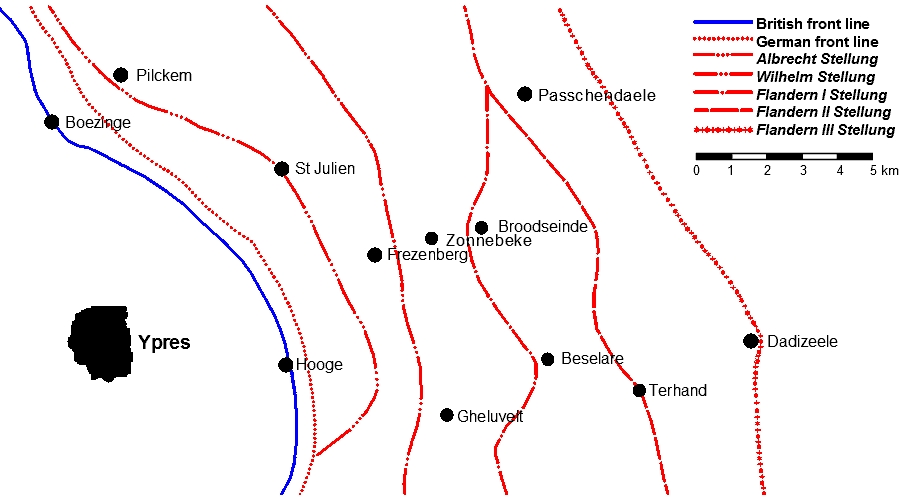
The British front line and the German defences in the area east of Ypres, mid-1917

From mid-1917, the area east of Ypres was defended by six German defensive positions the front position, Albrechtstellung (second position), Wilhemstellung (third position), Flandern I Stellung (fourth position), Flandern II Stellung (fifth position) and Flandern III Stellung (under construction). Between the German defence positions, lay the Belgian villages of Zonnebeke and Passchendaele. "Elastic" defence tactics had been rejected by the 4th Army Chief of Staff, Major-General Fritz von Loßberg, who believed that a tactical withdrawal by trench garrisons would disorganise the counter-attacking reserves, leading to the loss of the sector and danger to flanking units. Loßberg ordered the front line of sentry groups (Postengraben) to be held rigidly; British attacks would exhaust themselves and then be repulsed by local German reserves or by Eingreifdivisionen. Loßberg also judged that there was little prospect of British attacks being delayed by their need to move artillery forward and build supply routes. The British had a huge mass of artillery and the infrastructure necessary to supply it with ammunition, much of it built opposite the Flandern I Stellung in the period between the attack at Messines and 31 July.

German defensive tactics had been costly but succeeded on the front of XIX Corps on 31 July and against II Corps on the Gheluvelt Plateau on 31 July and during August, although the counter-attacks had been stopped in their turn by British artillery fire, when they reached areas where observation and communications between British infantry and artillery had been restored. Ludendorff later wrote that losses in the August battles had been unexpectedly high. The pause in British operations in early September helped to mislead the Germans. General von Kuhl (Chief of Staff, Army Group Crown Prince Rupprecht) doubted that the offensive had ended but by 13 September had changed his mind. Despite urging caution, Kuhl sent two divisions, thirteen heavy batteries and twelve field batteries of artillery, three fighter squadrons and four other air force units from the 4th Army. In the area about to be attacked, the army had six ground-holding divisions backed by three Eingref divisions and 750 guns.

== Battle ==
=== Second Army ===
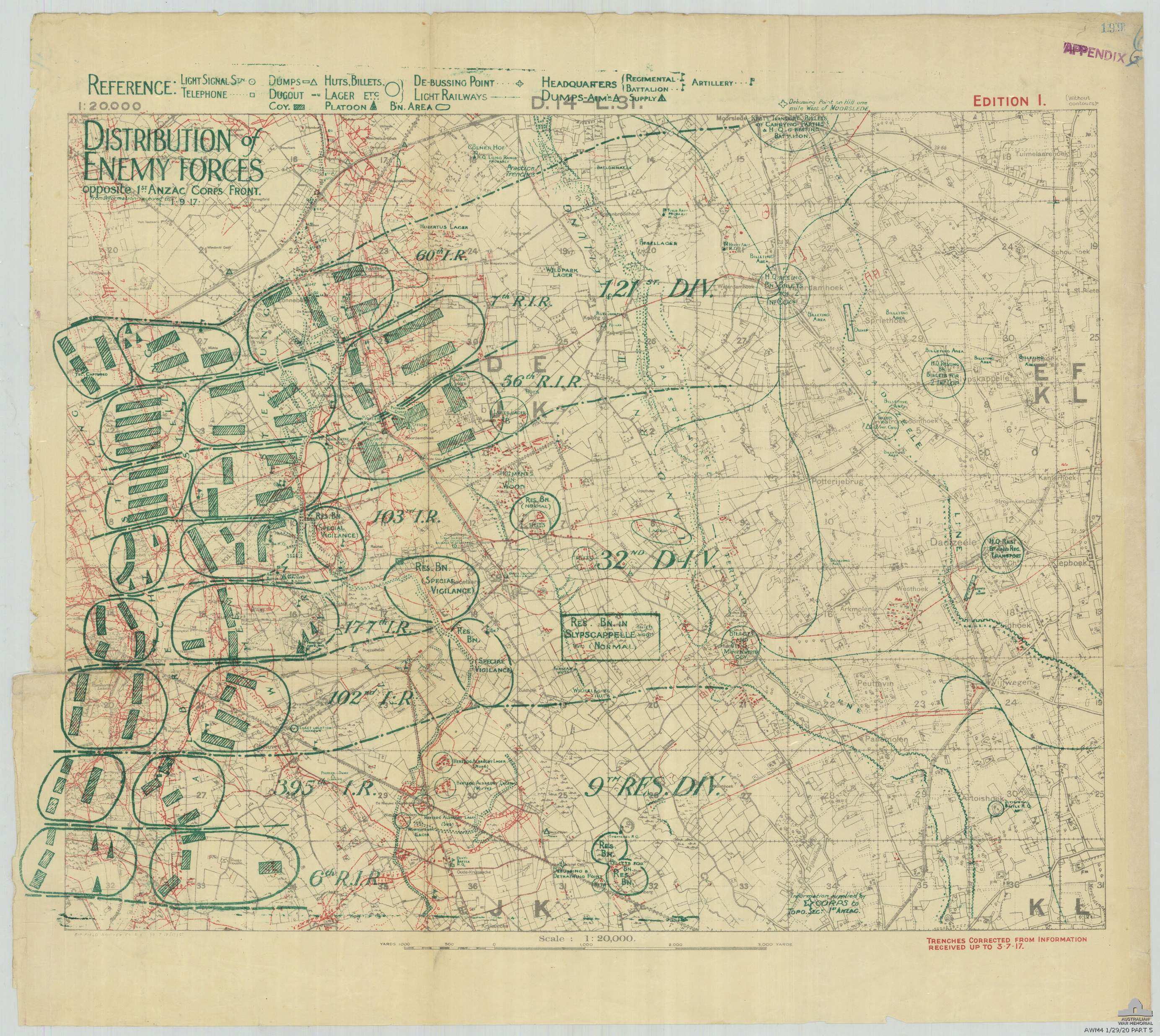
German troop dispositions opposite 1 ANZAC Corps, 1 Sept 1917.

The 19th (Western) Division in IX Corps covered the southern defensive flank of the attack front, against the German 9th Reserve and 207th divisions, on a 1,600 yd (1,500 m) front, from the Comines canal to Groenenburg Farm, on the west slope of the Bassevillebeek valley. The six attacking battalions of the 58th Brigade on the right and the 57th Brigade on the left and their supporting battalions had a difficult approach. The 58th Brigade had to pass through obstructions in Opaque Wood and Imperfect Copse and then it rained from midnight until 5:00 a.m. Zero hour was decided according to the weather and the time of 5:40 a.m. was passed forward at 1:45 a.m., so all ranks had to lie quiet in the rain for more than three hours.

Around dawn a heavy mist formed and at 5:40 a.m. the barrage began. On the right, the short advance to the first objective (red line) was met with opposition from dugouts south-west of Hessian Wood, Jarrocks Farm, Pioneer House and a small wood nearby. Machine-gun fire was also encountered from Hollebeke Château and the railway embankment. The right battalion reached the objective on time but the two to the left had many casualties, lost touch with their flanking units and the barrage, until the pause on the red line (first objective) allowed them to reorganise, mop-up and regain touch with units which had lost direction. The third battalion on the left was still held up by Hessian Wood so a defensive flank was formed facing north.

The 57th Brigade advanced to the red line against slight opposition on the right, while the two battalions on the left had to cross an extremely boggy area, which slowed them and they lost the barrage. The delay resulted in them being caught by machine-gun fire from dugouts near Top House while bunched up, because of the heavy going. The red line (second objective) which here was little further forward from the first objective (green line) was reached and two platoons from each attacking company moved up, ready to advance to the blue line (final objective) which began at 6:24 a.m. The second and final lines (red and blue) were contiguous on the right from Hessian Wood but the Germans defending the wood were still fighting when the advance was due to resume. Two companies of the right hand battalion managed to advance after suffering many losses and then a platoon went to assist the centre battalion. A number of dugouts were cleared and 50 prisoners were taken, which enabled the centre battalion to get into the north end of the wood and gain touch with the left-hand battalion in the south-west corner.

On the front of the 57th Brigade, the Germans at Wood Farm and Belgian Wood were overrun by a bayonet charge and the blue line (third objective) reached on time. During this advance, machine-gun sections and a battalion liaison detachment of the 39th Division pushed forward to North Farm, which was captured, four machine-guns and 29 prisoners were taken. At 8:10 a.m., the protective barrage lifted 200 yd (180 m) and patrols were sent forward to establish outposts and to clear the area of any German troops; Moat Farm and Funny Farm were mopped-up. Consolidation was begun despite machine-gun fire from Hollebeke Château, the green line (first objective) was dug-in and the ground forward to the blue line (final objective) defended in depth by outposts. A German counter-attack was attempted at 7:30 a.m. and "annihilated" by small-arms and artillery fire.

In X Corps to the north, the 39th Division, on the right, prolonged the southern defensive flank, from Groenenburg Farm northwards, down the slope to the Bassevillebeek. As it advanced 800 yd (730 m) to its objective, the division suffered badly from German fire from hidden dug-outs in the area further north, which had already stopped the 41st Division. When the division reached its objective, it swung back its left flank to link with the right hand brigade of the 41st Division. The main attack was made by X Corps and the 1st Anzac Corps, on a 4,000 yd (2.3 mi; 3.7 km) front on the Gheluvelt plateau. Steady pressure in early September from the 47th (1/2nd London) Division, had advanced the British front line near Inverness Copse for a considerable distance, which made better jumping-off positions for the attack by the Australians.

The four divisions advanced behind a creeping barrage of unprecedented weight. The increased amount of artillery allowed the heavy guns to place two belts of fire beyond the two from the field artillery; a machine-gun barrage in the middle made five belts, each 200 yd (180 m) deep. The creeping barrage started quickly, lifting 100 yd (91 m) every four minutes and this allowed the British infantry to surprise the German outpost garrisons, by looming out of the mist, while the Germans were still in their shelters. After four lifts, the barrage slowed to 100 yd (91 m) every six minutes. Most German troops encountered were so stunned by the bombardment, that they were incapable of resistance and surrendered immediately, despite few of the concrete pillboxes and Mebu shelters being destroyed. In the few areas where the German defenders were capable of resisting, they inflicted many losses but were quickly outflanked in the mist. The new system of local reserves allowed the British to maintain momentum, despite local checks.

The 41st Division had to advance across the Bassevillebeek valley, against the right of the German 9th Reserve Division and the left of the Bavarian Ersatz Division, to capture Tower Hamlets spur. The advance was hampered by overnight rain, which affected the valley more than the plateau to the north. Fire from camouflaged German machine-gun nests in the valley caused confusion and delay to the infantry, who lost the barrage. The Bassevillebeek stream in the valley was eventually crossed, with the 122nd Brigade struggling forward and the 124th Brigade being held up near the British front line, by numerous machine-guns in the Quadrilateral, three ruined cottages that had been fortified behind a digging 400 yd × 100 yd (366 m × 91 m) at the south end of the spur. The Quadrilateral commanded the western approach to the spur and the rise northwards to the pillboxes at Tower Hamlets. The left hand brigade of the division reached the third objective and threw back its right flank to the brigade on the right, which had advanced just beyond the second objective and then joined the left flank of 39th Division. Despite the failure to capture Tower Hamlets, parts of the two leading battalions of 124th Brigade running away before being rallied and two dead and three wounded battalion commanders, the division defeated all German counter-attacks during the day.

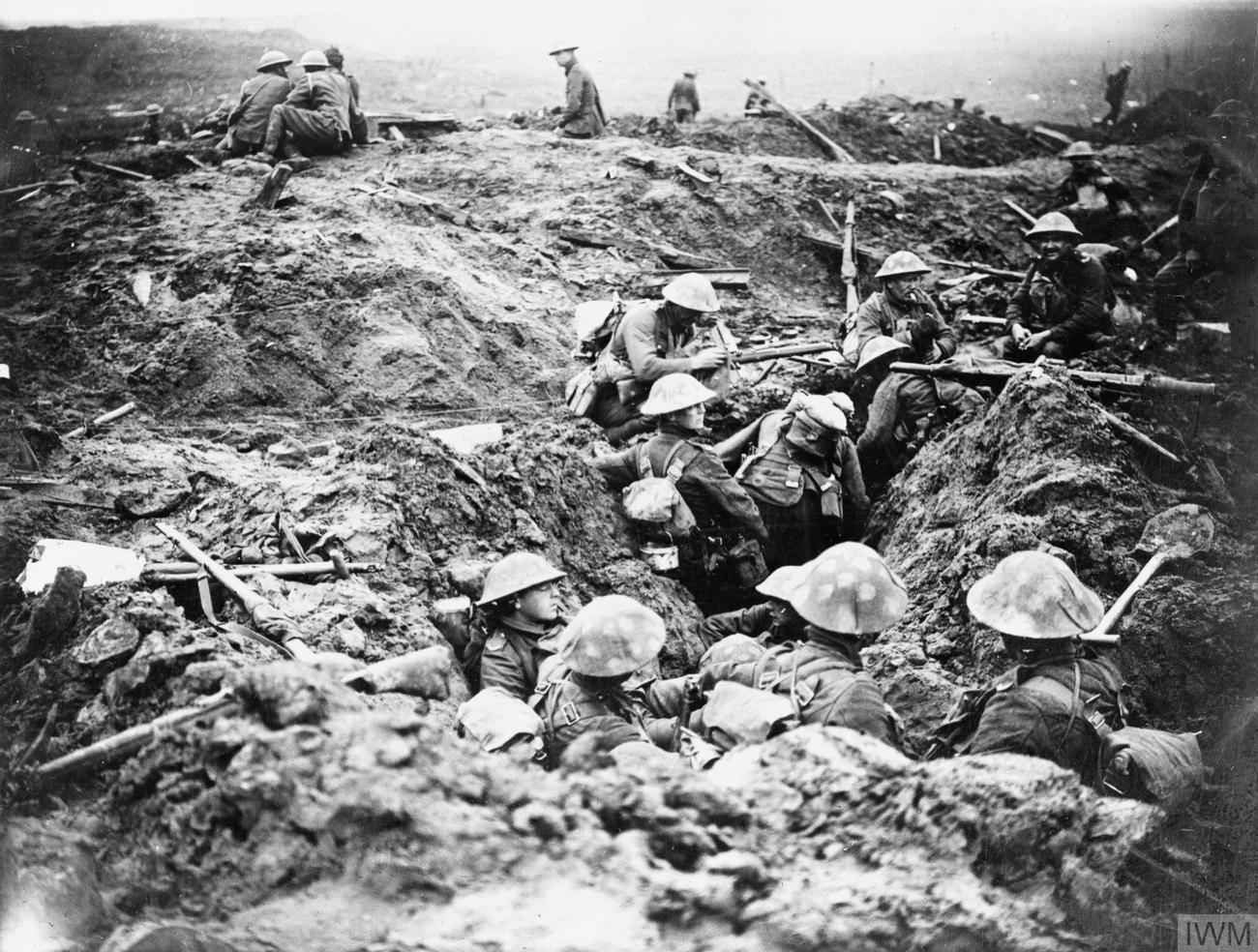
Men of the 13th Battalion, Durham Light Infantry, 23rd Division, resting in trenches during their advance on Veldhoek, 20 September 1917

The 23rd Division was held up for a short time by a German strong point in Dumbarton Wood, which had been missed by the barrage and caused many casualties. Despite the delay and the difficulty of navigating through clouds of dust and smoke caused by the barrage and the marshy ground north of Dumbarton Lake, the first objective was reached a few minutes after the barrage and consolidated along the source of the Bassevillebeek. The 69th Brigade on the left managed to get through Inverness Copse but German troops emerged from cover and fired on the troops behind as they moved up to attack the second objective, causing severe losses, before they were killed or captured. The troops, who had been severely reduced in numbers following on through the Copse, were still able to capture a line of German fortifications along Menin Road, north of the hamlet of Kantinje Cabaret. Of four tanks attached for the attack along Menin Road, one bogged early and the infantry advance was too swift for the other three tanks to keep up. One tank was knocked out on the road and the other two ferried ammunition and equipment to the troops at the final objective.

The 1st Australian Division on the right of I Anzac Corps, advanced on a 1,000 yd (910 m) front north of the Menin Road, with its right aimed at FitzClarence Farm, against part of the Bavarian Ersatz Division and most of the 121st Division. The Australians passed through Glencorse Wood, that had changed hands twice in August and quickly suppressed German resistance. The Germans at FitzClarence Farm were kept under cover by rifle grenade fire, while other groups got behind and rushed the garrison, taking 41 prisoners. Infiltration was also used against German machine-gunners in concrete shelters along the sunken road in the north end of the wood, who had caused many casualties. Close reserves worked behind the shelters, fought their way in and killed or captured the garrison. Nonne Bosschen was crossed by moving along the edges of shell craters, the second objective along the west edge of Polygon Wood being reached on time at 7:45 a.m. The Wilhemstellung (third line) pill-boxes and Mannschafts – Eisenbeton – Unterstände (Mebu shelters) were captured quickly, while the German defenders were dazed by the bombardment and unable to resist. (Note: Mannschafts – Eisenbeton – Unterstände were steel reinforced concrete shelters, capable of withstanding anything less than a direct hit by an 8-inch shell, similar to pill-boxes but not loop-holed for machine-guns.) Few accounts survive from the Bavarian Ersatz Division companies holding the ground either side of the Menin Road, as they were quickly overwhelmed by the 23rd Division and the 1st Australian Division. Machine-gun fire was heard from the Albrechtstellung (second line) at 8:30 a.m. but by 9:00 a.m. the British and Australians were well on the way to the Wilhemstellung (third line).

The 2nd Australian Division attacked with two brigades, one either side of the Westhoek–Zonnebeke road, against the German 121st Division, down the Hanebeek valley to the near bank. The German outpost garrisons were surprised, overrun and on the far side of the stream, the advance overwhelmed the Germans who mostly surrendered en masse. Visibility began to improve to 200–300 yd (180–270 m) and on breasting the rise, machine-guns in Albert and Iron Cross redoubts in the Wilhemstellung on Anzac House spur, the next rise to the east, were blinded by smoke grenades, at which the garrisons ran off. Further to the left, Anzac House, an important German artillery observation post, which overlooked the Steenbeek valley to the north, was captured as the garrison tried to engage the Australians by moving their machine-guns outside. As the divisions on the Gheluvelt plateau reached their second objective at 7:45 a.m., a breeze blew away the mist and revealed the magnitude of their achievement. The British and Australians had carried the defences which had held them up through August and had gained observation all the way to Broodseinde.

No German counter-attacks were mounted for the two hours that the British and Australians consolidated the second objective. The creeping barrage stood for fourteen minutes in front of the second objective, then advanced 2,000 yd (1,800 m) before returning to the new British front line and then advancing again, to lead the troops to the third objective. German counter-attacks were stopped before they reached the new British and Australian outposts. The German artillery only managed to fire a disjointed and sparse reply, which did little to obstruct the troops as they moved up, ready to advance to the third objective. Snipers and long-range machine-gun fire began to harass the troops consolidating the second objective. Local operations were mounted to suppress the sniping, using the methods that had been so successful earlier in the morning, leading to Black Watch Corner at the south-west of Polygon Wood and Garter Point east of Anzac House and other strong-points being captured.

At 9:53 a.m. the barrage resumed its forward movement towards the third objective, another 300–400 yd (270–370 m) away. The 23rd Division had to fight forward through pillboxes hidden in ruined cottages along the Menin Road, concrete shelters in Veldhoek and a hedgerow in front, before the German garrisons retreated. The left hand brigade was held up by a dozen pill-boxes in the Wilhemstellung until noon, which caused the division many losses but the ground at the final objective proved to be dry enough for the troops to dig in. The two Australian divisions reached the third objective in half an hour, finding Germans, in those strong points which had not been subdued during the halt on the second objective, as stunned as those met early in the day. Strafing by eight German aircraft, (one of which was shot down by ground fire) and some shelling by German artillery caused minor casualties, as the Australian divisions consolidated captured trenches and shell holes in their new front line.

=== Fifth Army ===
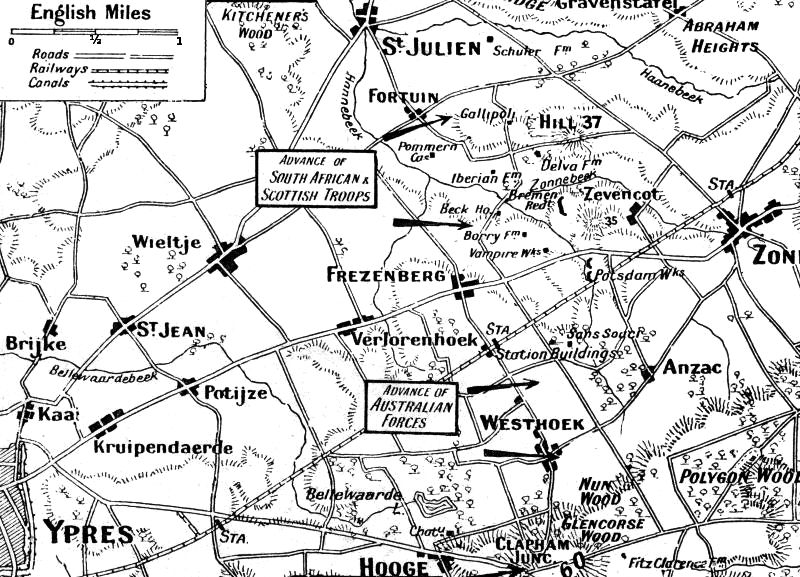
Frezenberg Ridge, September–October 1917.

The Fifth Army attacked on the left of the Second Army to capture the Wilhemstellung, with V Corps on the right and XVIII Corps on the left, to finish the capture of the line from Schuler Farm to Langemarck and then advance 500–800 yd (460–730 m) east towards Poelcappelle; XIV Corps formed the northern flank with the 20th (Light) Division. V Corps had more field guns than the I Anzac Corps to the right and fewer heavy guns, only a three-layer barrage was possible. A creeping barrage by 18-pounder field guns was to move at the same speed as that of the Second Army. Field guns and 4.5-inch howitzer fire were to comb the area in front of the creeping barrage, from 100–400 yd (91–366 m) deep and a neutralising barrage by 6-inch howitzers and 60-pounder guns was to sweep ground 450–1,200 yd (410–1,100 m) in front of the creeping barrage. Artillery not needed for counter-battery fire was to put standing barrages on the most dangerous German positions, like Hill 37, Hill 40 and German assembly areas in the dips behind Zonnebeke and Gravenstafel.

The 9th (Scottish) Division and the 55th (West Lancashire) Division of V Corps were to attack on fronts of 1,800 yd (1,600 m) over ground held by the right of the German 121st Division and the 2nd Guard Reserve Division, which had also changed hands twice in August. The large numbers of strong points, pillboxes and fortified farms east of the Hanebeek and Steenbeek streams were mostly intact, despite numerous attempts to smash them with artillery fire. The artillery brought to the Ypres salient in September went to the Second Army anf the Fifth Army adopted a new infantry formation, where moppers-up were reorganised into small groups of up to half a platoon, moving with the leading assault waves, to capture specific strong-points and then garrison them. XVIII Corps adopted the same practice, which became standard in the Fifth Army soon after the battle.

The 9th (Scottish) Division was confronted by the morass of the Hanebeek valley, where the stream had been choked by frequent bombardment and turned into a swamp and water-filled shell-holes. Both brigades sent two battalions forward to the first objective and leapfrogged two more through them to take the final objective. Hanebeek Wood on the right was barraged with smoke and high explosive shell rather than shrapnel, except for a lane along which a company was able to move behind the wood. When the artillery fire moved beyond the wood it was rushed from both directions and captured with fifty prisoners and four machine-guns. The South African Brigade on the left did the same thing at Borry Farm. In the mist, the strong points were easily overrun except for four pillboxes around Potsdam House, which were eventually attacked on three sides and captured, after inflicting many casualties on the attackers.

Delays caused by machine-gun nests dug in along the Ypres–Roulers railway did not stop the division reaching the first objective as the barrage began to creep forward again at 7:08 a.m. At 7:08 a.m. when the 9th (Scottish) Division began the advance to the final objective, the right hand brigade found only minor opposition. The South African Brigade on the left was badly hit by German machine-gun fire from Hill 37, as delays to the 55th (West Lancashire) Division meant that it was well short of the hill. The South Africans managed to capture Bremen Redoubt and Waterend House in the Zonnebeek valley and extend a defensive flank back to the first objective.

To the north of 9th (Scottish) Division the 55th (West Lancashire) Division began the day under strength after the losses of 31 July. Replacements had arrived slowly and 1,000 soldiers were left out of the battle, having arrived too late to be trained for the attack. German artillery and machine-gun fire from Reserve Regiment 91 of the 2nd Guard Reserve Division, engaged the infantry with massed small-arms fire as the attack began. The mist worked to the Germans' advantage in this part of the front, because the depleted British units missed several German strong points and dugouts, from which the Germans were able to stop the British support waves from moving up. The advanced troops realising this either halted or turned back and lost the barrage. The difficulties of the division were made worse at 7:08 a.m., when the scheduled advance to the final objective coincided with the dispersal of the mist.

Reserves were pushed forward around 10:00 a.m. from the 166th Brigade, which allowed the 165th and 164th brigades to take the first objective around Gallipoli Farm and the Schuler Galleries in front of Schuler Farm, by noon. Fighting at Hill 35 continued and the Germans regained Hill 37 with a counter-attack. Machine-guns were placed in the Schuler Galleries and nine machine-guns were dug in near Keir Farm, with which the British stopped German counter-attacks from making further progress. In the afternoon the rest of the reserve brigade captured Hills 35 and 37, which dominated the Zonnebeke spur. The right of the division established touch with the 9th (Scottish) Division but the centre and left of 55th (West Lancashire) Division were 500 yd (460 m) short of the final objective.

XVIII Corps was to advance onto the Gravenstafel and Poelcappelle spurs, held by the German 36th Division since 8 September. The divisions had to assemble east of the Steenbeek between St Julien and Langemarck, in low ground which was still muddy and full of flooded shell-holes, despite the better weather. The 58th (2/1st London) Division objective was 1,000 yd (910 m) ahead, among German strong points on the west end of Gravenstafel spur. As a frontal attack here had failed, the division feinted with its right brigade, while the left brigade made the real attack from the flank. The feint captured Winnipeg crossroads, as the main attack by three battalions one behind the other, captured Vancouver Farm, Keerselaere and Hubner Farm. The two following battalions passed through the leading battalion and turned right halfway up the spur, to reach Wurst Farm on a tactically vital part of the spur, at the same time as the barrage. Nearly 300 prisoners and fifty machine-guns were taken and outposts were established to the left, overlooking the Stroombeek valley. The division ascribed the success to the excellence of their training, an excellent creeping barrage and smoke shell, which had thickened the mist and blinded the German defenders; gas shell barrages on the German reinforcement routes had depressed German morale.

The 51st (Highland) Division further north, had the same task on Poelcappelle spur. The division advanced with one brigade on a 1,400 yd (1,300 m) front. The Germans in the Wilhemstellung were ready for them and fought until they were almost annihilated, in new machine-gun nests that they had dug in front of their front line, to avoid the worst of the artillery bombardment. The division reached the final objective in sight of Poelcappelle village. By these advances, XVIII Corps got observation of Poelcappelle and up the Lekkerboterbeek and Lauterbeek valleys, the capture of which allowed British artillery to move forward of the Steenbeek.

The 20th (Light) Division, on the right of XIV Corps, had to form the northern defensive flank of the offensive, on a front of 1,400 yd (1,300 m) from Poelcappelle spur to the Ypres–Staden railway. Two brigades attacked with two battalions each. The German Wilhemstellung, here known as Eagle trench, was held as determinedly as that part in the 51st (Highland) Division sector (Pheasant Trench) despite a bombardment from Livens Projectors (which fell behind the German trench and illuminated the British infantry as they advanced). By the end of the day the division was still short of the first objective, except on the left next to the railway.

The British offensive had captured most of the German outpost zones to a depth of about 1,500 yd (1,400 m). As the ground was captured it was prepared for defence, in anticipation of counter-attacks by the German Eingreifdivisionen. Captured German machine-gun nests and strong points were garrisoned and wired with German barbed wire found in the area. The final objective became the outpost zone and the second objective the main line of resistance, a chain of irregular posts using shell-holes concealed by folds of the ground and reverse slopes, avoiding trenches which attracted German shellfire. Communication between the infantry and artillery was established with runners, messenger dogs and pigeons. Wireless transmitters and power buzzers were set up at brigade headquarters and artillery observation posts, one for each artillery group. Engineer and pioneer units began to dig in telephone lines, which took until the afternoon of 21 September.

=== Air operations ===
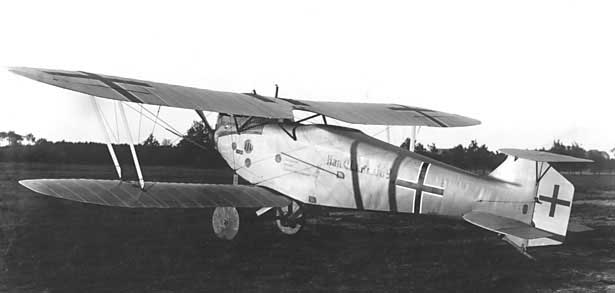
German Hannover CL.II escort fighter

Observing and reporting on German counter-attack movements was made a duty for all aircraft and patrol areas were given to II and V Brigades and the Headquarters Ninth Wing to observe. "Hostile Tactical Maps" were issued, showing German assembly points and the likely routes to them and towards the front line. The II Brigade covered the Second Army front east to the Roulers–Menin railway. The area was divided into three sectors, each with a counter-attack patrol of two fighters, maintained for eight hours after "zero-hour", flying below 500 ft (150 m) and using the special maps, to attack any German units they caught on the move and to drive off German low-flying aircraft. On return they were to telephone a report direct to the Second Army Report Centre at Locre, similar arrangements being made for the Fifth Army.

Ninth Wing aircraft were to patrol at low altitude east of Zarren–Oostnieukerke–Menin, beginning two hours after the start of the attack, to harass German reinforcements. Corps squadrons were to maintain counter-attack patrols on their Corps fronts, calling for immediate artillery fire and warning British infantry by smoke signal. Not all of these measures were possible on the day due to the weather, because it had rained on 19 September and was misty next morning but air operations commenced as soon as the mist cleared at 8.00 a.m. German aircraft attempting to intervene during the battle suffered from the presence of anti-aircraft guns near the front line and a Lewis gunner of a pioneer battalion in the 19th (Scottish) Division, shot down a German aircraft in flames at 1:30 p.m.; the feat was repeated next day and several German formations were broken up by ground fire.

=== German 4th Army ===
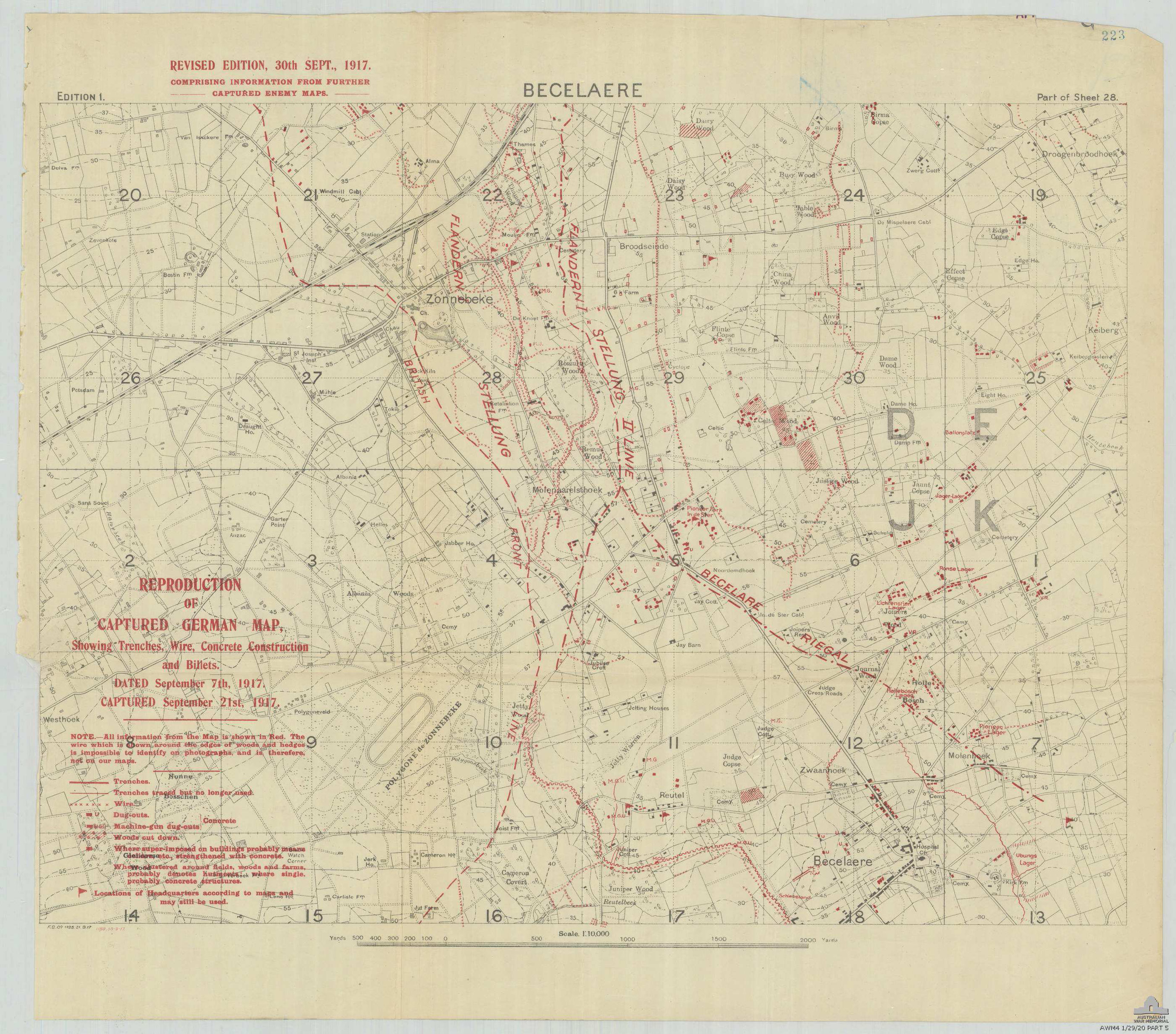
Reproduction of captured German trench map, 20 September 1917.

During the British infantry advances, German artillery managed a considerable amount of counter-battery fire, particularly from Zillebeke to Verbrandenmolen but this was not enough to stop the British artillery heavily bombarding German reserve battalions of the Stellungsdivisionen (ground-holding divisions), as they made futile attempts to counter-attack from 10:00 a.m. – 1.30 p.m. At 1:48 p.m. the British standing barrage in front of the new line ended. British air reconnaissance from zero hour was conducted by a contact aeroplane on patrol over each corps area, to observe the progress of the British infantry by flying low over the battlefield to map the positions of British troops by observing ground flares, mirrors, lamps and panels.

Earlier in the war, brigade headquarters had been ignorant of events and arrangements had been made for the swift transmission of information forwards. A counter-attack observation machine watched for German counter-attacks, from which German Eingreif units were seen advancing from the Flandern III Stellung at Menin, Moorslede and Westroosebeek. During the day 394 wireless messages were received from British observation aircraft and about a third of the reports resulted in immediate artillery-fire.

After 3.00 p.m., about three German infantry battalions were reported north of the Menin Road, moving up the Reutelbeek valley towards Polderhoek and a similar force with field artillery was seen moving west towards I Anzac Corps at Polygon Wood and Anzac spur. Another force was observed descending from the Poelcappelle spur at Westroosebeek, towards positions held by the Fifth Army. The troops were the leading regiments of three Eingreifdivisionen, 16th Bavarian Division from Gheluwe, the 236th Division from Moorslede and the 234th Division from Oostniewkirke. The 16th Bavarian Division counter-attack plan "Get Closer" (Näher heran) had been ordered at 5:15 a.m. and by 9:00 a.m., the division had advanced towards the area between Polygon Wood and Inverness Copse.

British medium and heavy artillery fired on the German troops, which were forced to deploy and advance from cover. After a considerable delay, the survivors reached British machine-gun range, as their artillery support overshot the British positions. Visibility was still exceptionally good, with the sun behind the British and Australians, who were easily able to see movement in front of them on the Gheluvelt plateau. The German force moving up the Reutelbeek valley into the area of the 23rd Division and the 1st Australian Division, was watched by the infantry and when at 7:02 p.m. a field artillery and machine-gun barrage fell on the Germans for an hour, all movement towards the British positions was stopped,

The 16th Bavarian Division was a high quality formation, but all the skill and dash in the world stood no chance in the face of the torrent of fire the British artillery could bring to bear at the critical points.

— Sheldon

a similar barrage for forty minutes in front of the 2nd Australian Division, on a regiment of the 236th Division advancing from Molenaarelsthoek and downhill from Broodseinde, stopped the counter-attack long before it came within range of the Australian infantry. On the southern edge of the plateau, German troops dribbling forward in the 39th Division area, managed to reinforce the garrison at Tower Hamlets, then tried twice to advance to the Bassevillebeek and were "smashed" by artillery and machine-gun fire.

In the Fifth Army area, from 800 yd (730 m) south of the Ypres–Roulers railway, north to the Ypres–Staden railway, many Germans were seen moving west down Passchendaele ridge around 5:30 p.m., into the area held by the 55th (West Lancashire) Division, 58th (2/1st London) Division and the 51st (Highland) Division. In the 58th (2/1st London) Division area, fire was opened on the Germans after half an hour, which forced the Germans to deploy into open order. When the Germans were 150 yd (140 m) from the first British strong point, the British defensive barrage arrived with such force that the German infantry "stampeded". No Germans were seen in the area until night, when patrols occupied an outpost. On the 55th (West Lancashire) Division front, "an extraordinarily gallant" German counter-attack by Reserve Infantry Regiment 459 (236th Division) from Gravenstafel, on Hill 37, through the positions of Reserve Infantry Regiment 91, was stopped by artillery and enfilade fire by machine-guns at Keir Farm and Schuler Galleries. A German attack down Poelcappelle spur at 5:30 p.m. towards the 51st (Highland) Division, had much better artillery support and although stopped in the area of the Lekkerboterbeek by 7:00 p.m., pushed the British left back to Pheasant trench in the Wilhemstellung, before the British counter-attacked and pushed the Germans back to the line of the first objective, 600 yd (550 m) short of the final objective. Gough wrote later

On the V Corps front they launched no less than six counter-attacks.... Their losses were very heavy and we captured over 1,300 prisoners.

—

Wolfgang Foerster the editor of Volume XIII of the German official history Der Weltkrieg wrote,

The German Eingreifdivisionen, 16th Bavarian Division at Gheluwe, 236th Division at Moorslede and 234th Division at Oostniewkerke in the Flandern III Stellung were assembled at their stations at 8:00 a.m. in readiness to move.... In spite of this the counter-attacks did not take effect until the late afternoon; for the tremendous British barrage fire caused most serious loss of time and crippled the thrust power of the reserves.

By nightfall the Eingreifdivisionen had been defeated.

== Aftermath ==
=== Analysis ===
In 1948, James Edmonds, the British official historian, wrote that with the exception of the failure to capture Tower Hamlets atop the Bassevillebeek Spur, the objectives of the attack had been achieved and the Germans tactically confounded. The French and British public knew little of the success but the contending armies in Flanders were well aware of its significance. The British replaced many of the attacking divisions, whose troops reported that if all attacks could be so well prepared, they would be content. On 20 September and the next few days of local fighting, the German had been driven from the positions on the Gheluvelt Plateau that had been the site of the main defensive effort (Schwerpunkt) since July. On 21 September, Haig issued orders for the next attack of the Second Army scheme, to complete the capture of Polygon Wood and part of Zonnebeke.

In 1996, Prior and Wilson wrote that the battle had been more costly relative to the ground gained on 31 July, even with the artillery reinforcements and better weather, that made British artillery-fire more accurate. The German artillery was still able to inflict casualties at a higher rate and the success on the Gheluvelt Plateau took less ground than on 31 July. Prior and Wilson wrote that the success of the Second Army was exaggerated because of the lower expectations created by the partial repulses inflicted by the Germans on 31 July, the failures in the rains during August and the British success against the German counter-attacks on 20 September, especially on the Gheluvelt Plateau.

In his 2008 biography of Haig, J. P. Harris wrote that the British had attacked exceptionally strong defences frontally, with an apparently unfavourable number of troops but that they had been given much more fire support, the British artillery enjoying a 3:1 superiority in numbers, creating an "unprecedented" concentration of fire. The Second Army had three times the artillery and the Fifth Army double the guns of 31 July. The British gunners produced a "wall of fire" 1,000 yd (910 m) deep, that swept the ground and then continued as a standing barrage for several hours after the end of the infantry advance. The attack had not been uniformly successful but the average advance was 1,250 yd (1,140 m) and German casualties were about the same as the British, most of their counter-attacks being deluged with artillery-fire and becoming costly failures. Harris wrote that Haig got over-enthusiastic and wanted the next attack to begin on 26 September, followed by two more in quick succession. Moving guns forward reduced the British rate of fire and gave the Germans sufficient respite to make a methodical counter-attack (Gegenangriff) on 25 September, south of Polygon Wood and although the attackers had "massive" casualties, the British attack the next day was disorganised and captured less ground.

=== Casualties ===
Edmonds recorded 20,255 British casualties (3,148 fatal) from 20 to 25 September; the 19th (Western) Division suffered 1,933 casualties. The British took 3,243 prisoners and inflicted many casualties on the German defenders. (Note: 208th, 2nd Guard Reserve, 36th, 25th (Eingreif), 121st, Bavarian Ersatz, 9th Reserve, 234th and 16th Bavarian divisions.) The calculations of German losses by Edmonds have been severely criticised ever since. In Volume XIII of Der Weltkrieg (1942) the Reichsarchiv historians recorded 25,000 casualties from 11 to 20 September, including 6,500 missing.

=== Subsequent operations ===
Minor attacks took place after 20 September; in the Second Army area, on 21 September, a 41st Division brigade attacked by short rushes towards Bassevillbeek Copse over extremely boggy ground, consolidating posts on the Bassevillebeek. Several German counter-attacks in the afternoon were repulsed and at 7:00 p.m. a much larger German attack was dispersed by artillery and small-arms fire. In the evening, a German attack was made on Hill 37 behind a creeping barrage against the 55th (West Lancashire) Division, taking some ground, until a British counter-attack restored the position by 9:15 p.m. A German raid on posts of the 8th Division (II Corps) next day failed and in the X Corps area the 23rd Division and the 1st Australian Division (I Anzac Corps) re-took the front line. In the XVIII Corps area, the 58th (2/1st London) Division held Stroppe Farm; in the evening the 51st (Highland) Division, with artillery and small-arms fire, repulsed a big German attack from Poelcappelle. The 20th (Light) Division repulsed a German attack at 6.30 a.m., then attacked Eagle Trench from both ends, capturing it despite determined German resistance. Crown Prince Rupprecht wrote in his diary for 23 and 24 September that he could not allow the British to remain in control of the higher ground around Zonnebeke or the Gheluvelt Plateau and that counter-strokes during the next enemy attack must reach their objectives. The 4th Army lacked reserves and needed time to meet another attack.

A bigger German attack on 25 September, on a 1,800 yd (1,600 m) front, from the Menin Road to Polygon Wood, began as the 23rd Division was being relieved by the 33rd Division. A German bombardment from 20 heavy and 44 field batteries (nearly four times the usual amount for a German division) began at 5:15 a.m., part of which fell short on two regiments of the 50th Reserve Division, which fell back until the bombardment began its creep towards the British positions. The German infantry advanced in the morning mist, either side of the Reutelbeek stream as the artillery boxed the British opposite, isolated them from their supports and preventing ammunition and other supplies from being brought to the front line. The German attack made little progress on the British right, lost direction in the gloom and veered north, joined with the German battalion there and reached Black Watch Corner, in the south-west angle of Polygon Wood, which was lost during the Battle of Polygon Wood next day.
