= Humphrey Forster (disambiguation) =

Sir Humphrey Forster (died 1602) was an English MP and High Sheriff.

Humphrey Forster may also refer to:

- Humphrey Forster (died 1555), High Sheriff of Berkshire and Oxfordshire
- Sir Humphrey Forster, 1st Baronet (1595–1663), of the Forster baronets, High Sheriff of Berkshire
- Sir Humphrey Forster, 2nd Baronet (1649–1711), of the Forster baronets, High Sheriff of Berkshire, MP for Berkshire

== See also ==
- Forster (surname)
