= George Forrester =

George Forrester may refer to:

- George Forrester (footballer, born 1927) (1927–1981), English football player
- George Forrester (footballer, born 1934) (1934–2001), Scottish football player
- George Forrester (cricketer) (1890–1959), Scottish cricketer
- George Forrester, 1st Lord Forrester (died 1654), created Lord Forrester in 1633
- George Forrester, 5th Lord Forrester (1688–1727)
- George Forrester, 6th Lord Forrester (1724–1748)
- George Forrester and Company, a British marine engine and locomotive manufacturer

== See also ==
- Forrester (surname)
