= Cyperus drakensbergensis =

Scientific classification
- Kingdom: Plantae
- Clade: Tracheophytes
- Clade: Angiosperms
- Clade: Monocots
- Clade: Commelinids
- Order: Poales
- Family: Cyperaceae
- Genus: Cyperus
- Species: C. drakensbergensis

Binomial name
- Cyperus drakensbergensis (Vorster) Govaerts, 2007

Species of sedge

Cyperus drakensbergensis is a species of sedge that is native to the KwaZulu-Natal region of South Africa.

== See also ==
- List of Cyperus species
