= Forrester =

Forrester may refer to:

- Forrester, Oklahoma, a community in the United States
- Forrester Research, a market research company
- Forrester RFC, a Scottish Rugby Union football club
- Forrester (surname), people with the surname Forrester
- Forrester Building, in Los Angeles, California

== See also ==
- Finding Forrester, a 2000 film starring Rob Brown and Sean Connery
- Forester (disambiguation)
- Forster (disambiguation)
