= Foster, Wisconsin =

Foster, Wisconsin is the name of two communities in the United States:

- Foster, Clark County, Wisconsin, a town
- Foster, Eau Claire County, Wisconsin, an unincorporated community
