= Forster =

Forster may refer to:

- Förster (or Foerster), a German surname meaning "forester"
- Forster (surname), an English surname, sometimes Anglicised from the German Förster
- Forster, New South Wales, a coastal town in southeast Australia
- Forster Motorsport, an auto racing team in Wallsend, Tyne and Wear, England
- Forster Music Publisher, Inc., a sheet music publisher founded in 1916 in the US city of Chicago
- Forster Square, a central square in Bradford, West Yorkshire, England
- USS Forster (DE-334), a destroyer escort ship launched in 1943; commissioned to the Atlantic and Mediterranean during World War II

== See also ==
- Bradford Forster Square railway station, a railway station near Forster Square
- Forster's tern, a seabird of the tern family, Sternidae
- Forester (disambiguation)
- Forrester (disambiguation)
- Foster (disambiguation)
- Fosters (disambiguation)
