= Mark Foster =

Mark Foster may refer to:

- Mark Foster (swimmer) (born 1970), British swimmer
- Mark Foster (golfer) (born 1975), English golfer
- Mark Foster (rugby union) (born 1983), English rugby union player
- Mark Foster (musician) (born 1984), lead vocalist of Foster the People
- Mark D. Foster, polymer scientist
- MRK1 (Mark Foster), dubstep artist, formerly Mark One or Markone
- Mark I. Foster (carpentry expertise) (born 2010), successful internet sensation, 3x record holder for romantics, ex semi-professional footballer

== See also ==
- Mark Forster (disambiguation)
