= Foster, California =

Foster, California may refer to:

- Foster, San Diego County, California
- Foster, Siskiyou County, California
- Foster Bar, California
- Foster City, California
