= Winnie Forster =

German journalist (born 1969)

- Born: Winfried Ernst Forster; 21 March 1969 (age 56); Starnberg, Bavaria, Germany
- Education: Abitur
- Occupations: Journalist; Publisher; Video game critic
- Father: Ernst Forster

Winfried Ernst Forster (born 21 March 1969) is a German journalist, publisher, and video game critic. He founded several popular German video game magazines from the early 1990s to early 2000s.

== Life ==
Forster was born the son of German tax law Ernst Forster on 21 March 1969 in Starnberg, Bavaria, Germany. He is the nephew of Gerhard Forster, the President of the Bavarian Office for the Protection of the Constitution from 1994 to 2001, and grandson of entomologist and zoologist Walter Forster.

In his school days, Forster played many arcade games like Centipede, Galaga, Pooyan, and 1942. After his Abitur in 1988 and Zivildienst till 1990, he worked as an editor for Markt+Technik-Verlag in Munich. In 1990, he started working for the IT-Verlag Markt & Technik. He became the leading editor for Power Play and was co-founder of Video Games. As he said, he was "regelmäßig beruflich in UK unterwegs" ("regularly on the road professionally in the UK") for Power Play. In 1993, he co-founded Cybermedia Verlags GmbH and headed the editorial team M! Games (then MAN!AC) and PC-Xtreme there together with Martin Gaksch. Forster is a co-founder and partner of the company, for which he built the first professional video game portal and forum in German in the mid-1990s with Maniac Online.

Around the same time, Forster worked on other market-leading magazines from other publishers, from 1992 the PC Player by Heinrich Lenhardt, from 1997 to 2007 the Bauer publication Bravo Screenfun. In 2000 and 2001, he realized the console special editions of GameStar, the prototype of today's GamePro, for IDG, as well as numerous reports and articles and product and market analyzes. In 2002, he founded his own publishing company GAMEplan, which he leads till today.

Since 2009, Forster has been talking with Heinrich Lenhardt, Anatol Locker and Jörg Langer in the monthly Spieleveteranen-Podcast about historical and recent trends and events in the computer and video game industry.

== Works (selection) ==
=== In German ===
- Spielkonsolen und Heimcomputer 1972–2002. Gameplan, Utting, 2003, ISBN 3-00-010658-8.
- Spielkonsolen und Heimcomputer 1972–2005. Gameplan, Utting, 2005, ISBN 3-00-015290-3.
- Spielkonsolen und Heimcomputer 1972–2009. Gameplan, Utting, 2009, ISBN 978-3-00-024658-6.
- Spielkonsolen und Heimcomputer 1972–2015. Gameplan, Utting, 2015, ISBN 978-3-00-048142-0.
- Joysticks. Gameplan, Utting 2004, ISBN 3-00-012183-8.
- Lexikon der Computer- und Video-Spielmacher. Gameplan, Utting, 2008, ISBN 978-3-00-021584-1.
- As publisher and translator: Volkscomputer: Aufstieg und Fall des Computer-Pioniers Commodore. Gameplan, Utting, 2011, ISBN 978-3-00-023848-2.
- As publisher, translator, and co-author: Atari: Kunst und Design der Videospiele. Gameplan, Utting, 2018, ISBN 978-3-00-058030-7.

=== In English ===
- Encyclopedia of Game.Machines. Gameplan, Utting 2005, ISBN 3-00-015359-4.
- Steering through the Microworld. In: Friedrich von Borries: Space Time Play. Birkhäuser, Basel among 2007, ISBN 978-3-7643-8414-2.
- Sega Game Applications: Console, Games and Development Possibilities. With Thorsten Oppermann in Walter Brenner/Lutz Kolbe: The Information Superhighway and Private Households. Physica-Verlag (Springer), Heidelberg, 1996, ISBN 3790809071.
