= Tom Forster (coach) =

American gymnastics coach

- Education: Mitchell High School; Pennsylvania State University
- Occupation: Gymnastics coach
- Known for: National Team Coach, Master of Sport, High Performance Team co-ordinator for the United States women's national gymnastics team (2018–2021)
- Spouse: Lori Bresciani Forster

Tom Forster is an American gymnastics coach, entrepreneur, and former gymnast. After Valeri Liukin resigned from the role in February 2018, USA Gymnastics named Forster as the high performance team coordinator for the United States women's national gymnastics team in July 2018 but he later resigned in December 2021. Prior to his position at USA Gymnastics, he found acclaim as a gymnastics coach on the national elite gymnastics circuit after founding and opening the Colorado Aerials Gymnastics facility in Colorado Springs, Colorado, in 1983— a club that has spawned many U.S. National team members and two Olympic Trials competitors. After widespread criticism from gymnasts, coaches, and gymnastics fans, he stepped down on December 9, 2021.

== Personal life ==
Forster graduated from Mitchell High School in Colorado Springs, and later Pennsylvania State University where he was a member of the Penn State Nittany Lions men's gymnastics team.

He is married to Lori Forster, with whom he founded Colorado Aerials in 1983. The facility was run by his family until June 2024.
