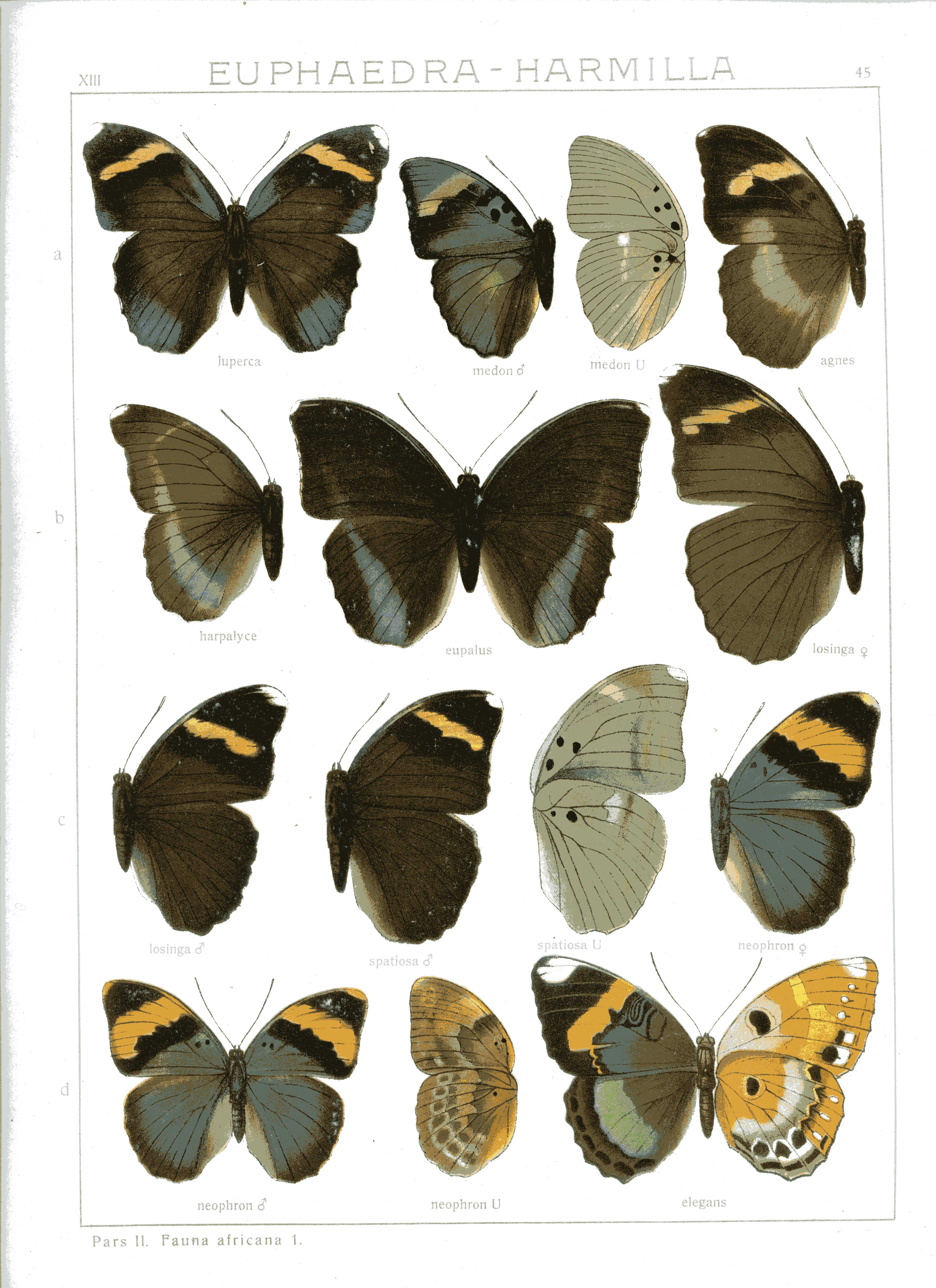
- In Adalbert Seitz's Fauna Africana

Scientific classification
- Domain: Eukaryota
- Kingdom: Animalia
- Phylum: Arthropoda
- Class: Insecta
- Order: Lepidoptera
- Family: Nymphalidae
- Subtribe: Pronophilina
- Genus: Harmilla; Aurivillius, 1892
- Species: H. elegans

Binomial name
- Harmilla elegans Staudinger, 1891

Synonyms
- Harmilla hawkeri Joicey & Talbot, 1926

= Harmilla =

Monotypic brush-footed butterfly genus

Harmilla is a butterfly genus in the family Nymphalidae. It contains only one species, Harmilla elegans, the elegant forester, which is found in Nigeria, Cameroon, the Republic of the Congo, the Democratic Republic of the Congo and Uganda. The habitat consists of swamp forests with a dense understorey.

Adults are attracted to fallen fruit.

== Subspecies ==
- Harmilla elegans elegans (Nigeria, Cameroon, Congo, Democratic Republic of the Congo: Bas-Zaire)
- Harmilla elegans hawkeri Joicey & Talbot, 1926 (western Uganda, Democratic Republic of the Congo: Equateur, Uele, Ituri, Kivu)
