= John Forster, 1st Baron Forster of Harraby =

British baron (1888–1972)

John Forster, 1st Baron Forster of Harraby KBE, QC (15 September 1888 – 24 July 1972), known as Sir John Forster between 1939 and 1959, was a British barrister and public servant.

Knighted at St James's Palace 13 July 1939 Forster was appointed President of the Industrial Court in 1946. The following year he was made a Knight Commander of the Order of the British Empire (KBE). In 1959 he was raised to the peerage as Baron Forster of Harraby, of Beckenham in the County of Kent.

Lord Forster of Harraby died in July 1972, aged 83, when the barony became extinct.

== Arms ==
Coat of arms of John Forster, 1st Baron Forster of Harraby
Crest A cubit arm erect habited Gules cuffed Argent holding in the hand proper a balance Or. Torse Or and Gules. Escutcheon Per chevron Or and Argent in chief two strawberry plants slipped leaved and fructed and in base an oak tree eradicated all Proper. Motto Let Peace Follow My Labour

Peerage of the United Kingdom
New creation	Baron Forster of Harraby; 1959–1972	Extinct
