= Grant Forster =

English cricketer

Personal information
- Full name: Grant Forster
- Born: 27 May 1961 (age 65); Seaham, County Durham, England
- Batting: Left-handed
- Bowling: Right-arm off break

Domestic team information
- Years: Team
- 1983–1986: Durham
- 1980/81–1982: Leicestershire
- 1980: Northamptonshire

Career statistics
Competition	First-class
Matches	5
Runs scored	45
Batting average	22.50
100s/50s	–/–
Top score	22*
Balls bowled	510
Wickets	4
Bowling average	68.75
5 wickets in innings	–
10 wickets in match	–
Best bowling	2/30
Catches/stumpings	3/–
- Source: Cricinfo, 12 August 2011

Grant Forster (born 27 May 1961) is a former English cricketer. Forster was a left-handed batsman who bowled right-arm off break. He was born in Seaham, County Durham.

In 1978, Forster played 3 Youth Test matches for England Under-19s against West Indies Young Cricketers, while in 1979, he played a single Youth One Day International against Australia Young Cricketers at the MCG. He later made his first-class debut for Northamptonshire against Cambridge University in 1980. In his only appearance Northamptonshire, he wasn't required to bat, while with the ball he took the wickets of Neil Crawford and Derek Pringle in the Cambridge first-innings, while in their second-innings he took the wicket of Crawford again. He joined Leicestershire following the end of the 1980 season, making his first-class debut for the county against Zimbabwe on Leicestershire's tour there. He made 3 further first-class appearances for Leicestershire, the last of which came against Lancashire in the 1982 County Championship.

He later joined Durham, making his debut for the county in the 1983 Minor Counties Championship against Hertfordshire. He played Minor counties cricket for Durham from 1983 to 1986, making 4 appearances in the Minor Counties Championship and a single appearance in the MCCA Knockout Trophy.
