= Forrester (surname) =

Forrester is a surname of Anglo/Norman origin, referring to a forester. Notable people with the surname include:

- Adam Forrester (born 2005), Scottish footballer
- Alexander Forrester (politician) (c. 1711–1787), British barrister and politician
- Andrew Forrester, pseudonym of British novelist James Redding Ware
- Bev Forrester (born 1951 or 1952), New Zealand farmer and fashion designer
- Billy Forrester, English footballer
- Bruce M. Forrester (1908-1995), American jurist
- Cay Forrester, American actress
- Chris Forrester (born 1992), Irish footballer
- Dia Forrester, Attorney General of Grenada
- Douglas Forrester (born 1953), American businessman
- Duncan Forrester (1933–2016), Scottish Theologian
- Gary Forrester, New Zealand musician, novelist, and poet
- George Forrester (disambiguation), various people
- Helen Forrester, English author
- Jack Forrester (1894–1964), Scottish-American golfer
- James Forrester (politician)
- James Forrester (rugby union)
- James H. Forrester (1870–1928), American lawyer, judge, and politician
- Jay Wright Forrester (1918–2016), founder of the study of system dynamics
- Joel Forrester, composer
- Joseph James Forrester (1809–1861), English businessman in Portugal
- Katrina Forrester (born 1986), English political theorist and historian
- Maureen Forrester (1930-2010), Canadian singer
- Neil Forrester (born 1950), Entomologist and biotechnology specialist
- Patrick Graham Forrester (born 1957), American army officer and astronaut
- Philippa Forrester, English media personality
- Stephanie Forrester (triathlete)
- Thomas Forrester, (1838–1907), New Zealand architect and engineer
- Tony Forrester, English bridge player and writer
- Viviane Forrester (1925–2013), French writer

Fictional

- Doctor Clayton Forrester (War of the Worlds)
- Dr. Clayton Forrester (Mystery Science Theater 3000)
- Lee Forrester, comic book character
- Maryann Forrester, True Blood
- Pearl Forrester, Mystery Science Theater 3000
- The Forrester family on The Bold and the Beautiful
- Sophia Forrester, Last Exile
- William Forrester, Finding Forrester (film)
- House Forrester, Game of Thrones: A Telltale Games Series

== See also ==
- Forester (disambiguation)
- Forster (disambiguation)
- Foster (disambiguation)
- Forrest (disambiguation)
