= John Forster (footballer) =

Australian rules footballer

Personal information
- Born: 18 June 1948 (age 78)
- Original team: Tasmanian Amateurs
- Height: 180 cm (5 ft 11 in)
- Weight: 73 kg (161 lb)

Playing career^{1}
Years	Club	Games (Goals)
1968–70	Melbourne	9 (0)
- ^{1} Playing statistics correct to the end of 1970.

John Forster (born 18 June 1948) is a former Australian rules footballer who played with Melbourne in the Victorian Football League (VFL).
