= William H. Forster =

American Army general (born 1939)

William H. "Bud" Forster
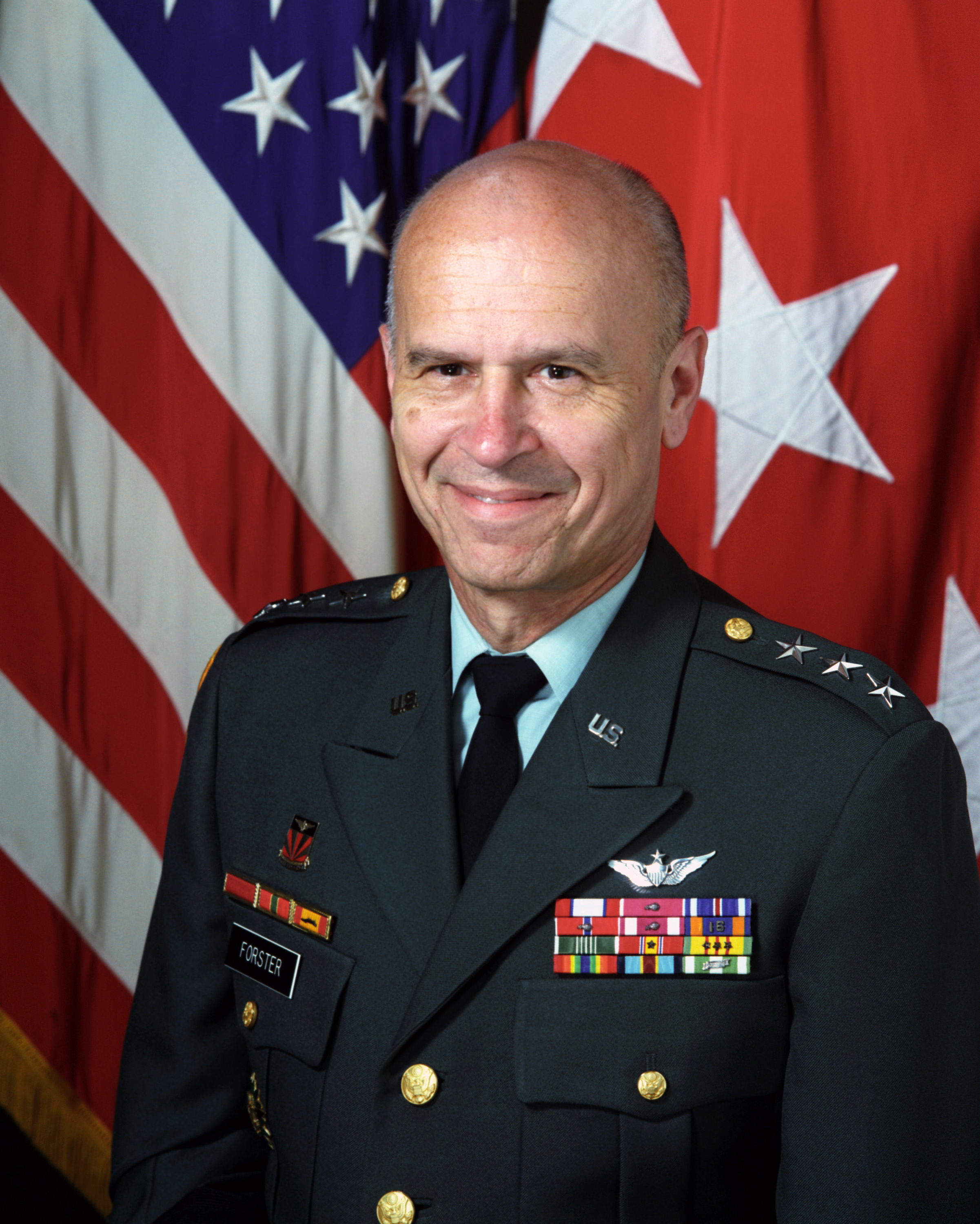
- Born: 24 June 1939 (age 87); Shelby, Mississippi, U.S.
- Military career
- Allegiance: United States
- Branch: United States Army
- Service years: 1960–1995
- Rank: Lieutenant General
- Commands: U.S. Army Operational Test and Evaluation Command; 10th Combat Aviation Battalion; 173rd Assault Helicopter Company
- Conflicts: Vietnam War
- Awards: Distinguished Service Medal (2); Legion of Merit (2); Distinguished Flying Cross; Bronze Star Medal (2); Meritorious Service Medal (2); Air Medal (16)

William Hull "Bud" Forster Sr. (born 24 June 1939) is a retired lieutenant general in the United States Army who served as military deputy to the U.S. Assistant Secretary of the Army for Research, Development and Acquisition from 1992 until his retirement from active duty in 1995. He previously served as commanding general of the Army Operational Test and Evaluation Command from August 1991 to August 1992.

== Early life and education ==
Born in Shelby, Mississippi, Forster graduated from University of Alabama in 1960 with a B.S. degree in chemistry. He was commissioned through the Army ROTC program and assigned to the 91st Division while attending graduate school. Forster earned an Ph.D. degree in nuclear chemistry from the University of California, Davis in 1965. His doctoral thesis was entitled Cross section ratios of isobars from spallation reactions under varying conditions. He is also a graduate of the Armed Forces Staff College, the U.S. Naval Test Pilot School and the Air War College.

== Military career ==
Forster served two combat tours in Vietnam, where he commanded the 173rd Assault Helicopter Company and an air defense artillery unit. He was awarded the Distinguished Flying Cross, two Bronze Star Medals and sixteen Air Medals.

After graduating from the Naval Test Pilot School, Forster became the first Army officer selected as an astronaut candidate. Robert L. Stewart eventually became the first Army astronaut, but Forster received the NASA Award for Outstanding Service after his time at the Johnson Space Center.

After commanding the 10th Combat Aviation Battalion, Forster took on a series of aviation administration assignments. He served as program manager for both the Kiowa and Apache helicopters. Forster was designated the first Program Executive Officer Aviation from 1987 to 1988. He later served as Director of Army Aviation at the Pentagon from 1989 to 1990.

== Additional awards ==
Forster received the Secretary of Defense Superior Management Award for his work in support of the Army helicopter improvement program. He was elected to the Russian Academy of Natural Sciences in 1992 while still serving as an American Army officer. Forster was designated a Technical Fellow of the American Helicopter Society in 1997. He was elected to the Army Aviation Association of America Hall of Fame in 2010.

== Personal ==
Forster is the son of William O. H. "Bill" Forster (11 October 1904 – 23 January 1994) and Amy Hull Forster (2 June 1910 – 30 December 1983). He has a brother and a sister.

Forster was married to Belle Fair (Brown) Forster (4 February 1940 – 25 January 2021). They had two sons and two grandsons.

After his first marriage ended in divorce on 31 January 1995, Forster married Francine M. Forster.
