= Victor Forster =

Irish Anglican priest (1917–2009)

Victor Henry Forster (1917-2009) was an Irish Anglican priest: he was Archdeacon of Clogher from 1983 to 1989.

Forster was educated at Trinity College, Dublin and ordained in 1946. After curacies at Magheralin and Garrison he held incumbencies at Killeevan, Rathgraffe and Aghalurcher.
