= Foster Island =

Foster Island may refer to:

- Foster Island (Ontario)
- Foster Island (Washington)
- Foster Islands (Tasmania)
