= Matt Forster =

English footballer

Personal information
- Full name: Matthew Forster
- Date of birth: 19 August 1900
- Place of birth: Whickham, Durham, England
- Date of death: July 1976 (aged 75)
- Height: 5 ft 10 in (1.78 m)
- Position: Full back

Senior career*
Years	Team	Apps	(Gls)
1920–1929	Tottenham Hotspur	236	
1930–1932	Reading	70	
1933–????	Charlton Athletic	1	
- * Club domestic league appearances and goals

Matthew Forster (19 August 1900 – July 1976) was a professional footballer who played for Tottenham Hotspur, Reading and Charlton Athletic.

== Football career ==
Forster, a full back, joined Tottenham from Newburn in 1920 and made 244 appearances in all competitions for the club. He joined Reading in 1930 and went on to feature in a further 70 matches before making the move to Charlton Athletic in 1933 and play a solitary game.
