= George Forrester (footballer, born 1934) =

Scottish footballer

Personal information
- Full name: George Hogg Forrester
- Date of birth: 28 August 1934
- Place of birth: Edinburgh, Scotland
- Date of death: 13 April 2001 (aged 66)
- Place of death: Edinburgh, Scotland
- Position: Full back

Youth career
- Raith Rovers

Senior career*
| Years | Team | Apps | (Gls) |
| 1953–1954 | Sunderland | 0 | (0) |
| 1954–? | Raith Rovers | 0 | (0) |
| ? | Dundee | 0 | (0) |
| 1957 | Brechin City | 1 | (0) |
| 1958 | Dundee United | 9 | (0) |
| 1959–1960 | Eyemouth United | | |
| 1960–1962 | Accrington Stanley | 54 | (0) |
| 1962–1965 | Sankeys of Wellington | | |
| 1965–1966 | Altrincham | | |
| 1966–1969 | Macclesfield Town | 109 | (2) |
- * Club domestic league appearances and goals

George Hogg Forrester (28 August 1934 – 13 April 2001) was a Scottish footballer who played as a full back. He played for Accrington Stanley from 1960 until they dropped out of the Football League in 1962, and also played in the Scottish Football League for Brechin City and Dundee United. He played for non-League club Eyemouth United when they reached the quarter-finals of the Scottish Cup in 1959–60, and also helped Altrincham reach the third round of the FA Cup for the first time.

== Playing career ==
George Forrester was born in Edinburgh on 28 August 1934. He was a youth player with Raith Rovers before joining Sunderland in 1953, where he failed to make a first-team appearance. He was given a free transfer in May 1954. He returned to Raith Rovers and then joined Dundee, but again didn't appear for either club's first team. After receiving a free transfer from Dundee, he had a brief spell with Brechin City between September and November 1957, playing in one league match. Forrester then signed for Dundee United in February 1958, where he made nine league appearances before leaving the club in September 1958.

Forrester later joined Eyemouth United in the East of Scotland League. He was a member of the Eyemouth team that reached the quarter-finals of the Scottish Cup in 1959–60, the only club from the East of Scotland League ever to do so, before losing to eventual finalists Kilmarnock. The Cup run attracted the attention of Accrington Stanley, who signed Forrester in February 1960 for around £1000. He was a regular member of the Accrington team, making 87 appearances up until they resigned from the Football League in March 1962 due to financial problems.

After leaving Accrington, Forrester ended the 1961–62 season with Sankeys of Wellington in the Cheshire County League. He went on to spend three years with the club. In 1965 he joined Altrincham, where he was made captain. In his only season at Altrincham, the club won the Cheshire County League title, were runners-up in the Cheshire County League Cup and reached the third round of the FA Cup for the first time in the club's history, eventually losing to Wolverhampton Wanderers. Despite these successes, Forrester was allowed to leave at the end of the 1965–66 season and subsequently joined another Cheshire County League team, Macclesfield Town. After winning the County League title in 1968, Macclesfield played the 1968–69 season in the new Northern Premier League, becoming its first champions. Forrester retired in 1969, having also won the Cheshire County Cup in his final season.

== After football ==
After retiring Forrester maintained his connection with Macclesfield, running the Moss Rose Hotel adjacent to the club's Moss Rose ground. He died in 2001 in his native Edinburgh.
