= John Forester =

John Forester or Forrester may refer to:

== Politicians ==
- John Foster (by 1508 – between 1547 and 1551), a.k.a. John Forester
- John Howard Forester (1887–1958), Canadian politician
- John B. Forester (died 1845), American politician from Tennessee
- John Forrester (politician) (1924–2007), British politician

== Others ==
- John Forester (cyclist) (1929–2020), American cycling activist
- John F. Forester, American planning theorist
- John Forrester (historian) (1949–2015), British historian and philosopher
- John Forrester (trade unionist) (died 1978), British trade union official
- John Forrester (umpire) (1887–1946), New Zealand cricket umpire
- John Forrester (The Bold and the Beautiful), a fictional character

== See also ==
- Jack Forrester of Nebraska State League
- John Foster (disambiguation)
