= Madeline von Foerster =

American painter

- Born: San Francisco
- Education: California College of the Arts
- Known for: Painting
- Website: www.madelinevonfoerster.com

Madeline von Foerster (born in San Francisco) is an American artist who resides in Germany.

== Biography ==
To create her unique paintings, Madeline von Foerster uses a five century-old mixed technique of oil and egg tempera, developed by the Flemish Renaissance Masters. Although linked stylistically to the past, her paintings are urgently relevant to the Anthropocene, exploring the human relationship to nature with such themes as deforestation, wildlife trafficking, and human-caused extinction.

Von Foerster's artworks are in public and private collections around the world and have been featured in numerous publications, including "100 Painters of Tomorrow" (Thames and Hudson, 2014), and an eight-page feature in Germany's "Art" Magazine. She was also the subject of a television portrait on ARTE's "Metropolis," broadcast in Germany and France. Born in San Francisco, she studied art in California, Germany and Austria. After fifteen years in New York City, she now resides in Germany with her husband.

== Solo exhibitions ==
- 2011: The Golden Toad, Roq La Rue Gallery, Seattle
- 2010: Reliquaries, Strychnin Gallery, Berlin
- 2008: Waldkammer, Strychnin Gallery, Berlin
- 2006: Desires Distilled, Fuse Gallery, Manhattan, NY

== Collections of Note ==
=== Public Collections ===
- Whatcom Museum, Bellingham, WA
- QCC Art Gallery, City University of New York

=== Notable Private Collections ===
- Guillermo del Torro, Filmmaker
- Mark Parker, CEO, Nike
- John Zorn, Composer
