= Leah Forster =

American comedian

Leah Forster is an American comedian, social media personality, and author known for her work within and outside the Orthodox Jewish community. Forster began as an ultra-Orthodox stand-up comic and became known for her style of Jewish satire and storytelling, addressing gender roles and societal norms. Controversy around her work has brought attention to issues of inclusion and LGBTQ+ visibility in Orthodox spaces. She is also the CEO of THE CORPORATE MINUTE - a business that specializes in building and upscaling businesses.

== Early life ==
Forster grew up in a Haredi family in Borough Park, Brooklyn.

== Career ==
Forster began as an ultra-Orthodox female stand-up comic, performing "by women, for women" routines. She began to perform internationally and amassed a social media following.

Forster performs for secular and Orthodox audiences. In 2018, her scheduled New Year's Eve show at a New York kosher restaurant was canceled, reportedly under pressure from religious leaders over her sexuality, though the kosher agency gave a different version of events. The controversy boosted her social media following and attracted invitations to new venues and audiences.

Forster's "Tichel Tuesday" videos are among her satirical portrayals of Orthodox life. Her off-Broadway show "That's Yentatainment!" opened in late 2024 at the Theater For The New City. Produced by the New Yiddish Rep, the show told Forster's journey from closeted Haredi teacher to openly lesbian comedian, influencer, and author.

== Works ==
- "That's Yentatainment!", Theater For The New City, New Yiddish Rep, 2024
- Club Miilff, Spines, 2024 ISBN 979-8895694558

== Personal life ==
Forster continued observing the Jewish sabbath, keeping a kosher home and fasting on Yom Kippur.[8]
