= August Förster (physician) =

German anatomist (1822–1865)

August Förster (8 July 1822 in Weimar – 15 March 1865 in Würzburg) was a German anatomist.

== Biography ==
He was born at Weimar, and educated at the University of Jena (1841–45). He subsequently became an associate professor at the University of Göttingen (1852), relocating to the University of Würzburg in 1858 as a full professor of pathological anatomy. His investigations on pathological histology and teratology were widely noted.

In 1854 he provided an early description of Charcot-Leyden crystals, and in 1862, described what would later become known as Meckel syndrome.

== Works ==
- Lehrbuch der pathologischen Anatomie (10th edition 1875)
- Atlas der mikroskopischen pathologischen Anatomie (1854-1859)
- Grundriss der Encyklopädie und Methodologie der Medizin (1857)
- Die Mißbildungen des Menschen systematisch dargestellt (1861), A book on human teratology, known for its meticulous illustrations.
