= William Forster (priest) =

Irish dean of Kilmacduagh (1760–1823)

William Forster (7 November 1760 – 16 April 1823) was an Anglican priest in Ireland during the early 19th century.

Forster was born in County Meath and educated at Trinity College Dublin. He was the Dean of Kilmacduagh from 1803 until his death.
