= Cecil Forester (disambiguation) =

Cecil Louis Troughton Smith (1899–1966) was an English novelist who wrote under the pseudonym Cecil Scott (C. S.) Forester.

Cecil Forester may also refer to:

- Cecil Forester (MP) (c. 1721–1774), British MP
- Cecil Weld-Forester, 1st Baron Forester (c. 1767–1828), British MP and son of the above
- George Weld-Forester, 3rd Baron Forester (1807–1886), British MP and Comptroller of the Household and son of the above
- Cecil Weld-Forester, 5th Baron Forester (1842–1917), British MP and nephew of the above
- George Cecil Beaumont Weld-Forester, 6th Baron Forester (1867–1932), British soldier and son of the above
- Cecil George Wilfred Weld-Forester, 7th Baron Forester (1899–1977), son of the above
- George Cecil Brooke Weld-Forester, 8th Baron Forester (1938–2004), son of the above
