= Franz Förster =

Franz Förster (7 July 1819 in Breslau - 8 August 1878) was a German jurist.

== Biography ==
In 1874, he was appointed director of the Ministry of Ecclesiastical Affairs. He assisted in the compilation of the new Prussian Code of Judicial Procedure, and wrote several standard works on Prussian law, which include: Preussisches Grundbuchrecht (1873), and Theorie und Praxis des heutigen gemeinen preussischen Privatrechts (7th ed. 1896–97).
