= Forester (disambiguation) =

A Forester is a person who practises forestry, the science and profession of managing forests.

Forester may also refer to:

== Butterflies ==
- Forester butterflies, the genera Euphaedra (typical foresters) and Harmilla (elegant forester)
- Lethe (butterfly), a group of satyr butterflies commonly known as the foresters

== Geography ==
- Forester, Arkansas, a ghost town
- Forester Township, Michigan, a civil township
- The Forester, Ealing, listed pub in London
- Forester, Tasmania, a locality in Australia

== Arts ==
- The Forester (album), 2013 album by Susanna & Ensemble neoN
- The Foresters, play by Alfred Tennyson that premiered in 1892

== People ==
- Forester (surname)

== Fraternal organizations ==
- Ancient Order of Foresters
- Independent Order of Foresters (operating as Foresters)
- Baron Forester, a title in the Peerage of the United Kingdom
- Free Foresters, a cricket team
- Forester Brigade, an administrative formation of the British Army from 1948 to 1964

== Brands ==
- Subaru Forester, automobile (manufactured from 1997)
- DARPA FORESTER, Foliage Penetration Reconnaissance, Surveillance, Tracking and Engagement Radar

== See also ==
- Forrester (disambiguation)
- Forster (disambiguation)
