= Michelanne Forster =

New Zealand playwright and scriptwriter

Personal details
- Born: 26 April 1953 (age 73) California, US
- Education: University of Auckland
- Occupation: Playwright, scriptwriter

Michelanne Forster (born 26 April 1953) is a New Zealand playwright and scriptwriter who was born in California, US. Her writing career began in the 1980s at Television New Zealand where she worked on the popular pre-school programme Play School. Her plays have been performed both nationally and internationally and are often based on historical accounts. In 2011 Forster was the writer-in-residence at the Michael King Writer's Centre.

== Education ==
Forster graduated from the University of Auckland with a Bachelor of Arts and also holds a Diploma in Teaching from the Auckland Secondary Teachers College. In 2014 she completed her honours in Drama through the University of Auckland. Forster has a MFA (Master of Fine Arts) from Massey University, Wellington 2021.

== Plays ==
- Always My Sister
- Don't Mention Casablanca
- Tic Tac (with Paul Barrett)
- The Great Storm of 1868
- My Heart is Bathed in Blood
- This Other Eden
- The Rosenberg Sisters
- Larnach – Castle of Lies
- Songs My mother Taught Me (Music by Felicity Williams)
- Daughters of Heaven
- A Dream Romance (Musical)

== Plays for children ==
- Sapai and the Yam Snatchers (with Leilani Unasa)
- The Butcher and The Bear of kirstyn
- The Secret of Dongting Lake
- In the Deep End
- Mean Jean the Pirate Queen
- The Bungling Burglars (music by Felicity Williams)
- Rodney Rat and the Sneaky WeaselGang
- Rivals and Idols
- Arabella and the Amazing Wardrobe
- Musical Beasts

== Awards ==
- 2011 Writer-in-Residence Michael King Writer's Centre, University of Auckland
- 1997 Best Radio New Zealand Drama, The Rosenberg Sisters
- 1996 Best Radio New Zealand Drama, Larnach – Castle of Lies
- 1994 Buckland Memorial Award for Literature, Daughters of Heaven
- 1993 Writer-in-Residence University of Canterbury

== Publications ==
- Daughters of Heaven (Polish translation) in Dwa Oceany (Agencja Dramatu i Treatru ADiT, 2013)
- When Its Over: New Zealanders Talk about Their Experiences of Separation and Divorce (Penguin, 1998)
- The Rosenberg Sisters in Playlunch: Five Short New Zealand Plays (Otago University Press, 1996)
- Daughters of Heaven (Otago University Press, 1992)
- Rodney Rat and the Space Creatures (Hodder and Stoughton, 1989)
- Rodney Rat and the Sneaky Weasel Gang (Hodder and Stoughton, 1985)
- The Four-Legged Prince (Hodder and Stoughton, 1985)
- Rodney Rat and the Sunken Treasure (Hodder and Stoughton, 1983)
