= Foster, San Diego County, California =

Unincorporated community in California, United States

Coordinates: 32°54′30″N 116°55′34″W

Foster was a settlement in east San Diego County, California. It was located approximately 3.5 miles (5.6 km) north of Lakeside, near the present-day location of San Vicente Dam. It was the terminus of the San Diego, Cuyamaca, and Eastern Railroad from 1889, when the railroad reached the town, until 1916, when parts of the railway between Lakeside and Foster were damaged by floods. The line was never rebuilt and the town declined thereafter. There were 7 buildings in Foster in 1891–93, according to the 1893 USGS survey map. A road connecting Lakeside to Ramona and Julian ran through Foster until 1942, when the section just north of Foster was submerged to create San Vicente Reservoir and the road was rerouted further west, bypassing the settlement. The town was named after local rancher Joseph Foster.
