= Fosters =

Fosters or Foster's may refer to:

== Places ==
- Fosters, Alabama
- Fosters, Michigan
- Fosters, Ohio

== Television ==
- The Fosters (British TV series), a short-lived British sitcom that ran from 1976 to 1977
- The Fosters (American TV series), an American drama series that aired on Freeform from 2013 to 2018
- Foster's Home for Imaginary Friends, an animated television show on Cartoon Network

== Other ==
- Foster's Cafeterias, a chain of cafeterias in San Francisco, California from the 1940s to 1972
- Foster's English Muffins, sourdough English muffins sold at Foster's cafeterias to take home
- Foster's Group, an Australian brewer and distributor
- Foster's Lager, an Australian beer
- Fosters Freeze, a chain of fast-food restaurants in California
- Fosters of Lincoln, British agricultural machinery company, William Foster & Co.
- Fosters' Bank, in Cambridge, England
- Foster and Partners, also known as Fosters, a British firm of architects

== See also ==
- Foster (disambiguation)
- Forster (disambiguation)
