= James William Forster =

James William Forster (1784 - 1861), a graduate of Trinity College, Dublin, was Archdeacon of Aghadoe from 1834 and Vicar general of the Diocese of Limerick, Ardfert and Aghadoe until his death on 28 May 1861.
