= Marc R. Forster =

American historian

Marc Richard Forster (born 1959) is an American historian. He is the Henry B. Plant Professor of History at Connecticut College, where he was also appointed as the chair of its history department. In 2015, Forster served as the President of the Sixteenth Century Studies Society and Conference. In 2016, he was appointed as the College Marshall of Connecticut College.

== Biography ==
Forster is the son of Elborg Forster and social historian Robert Forster (1931–2020), who had been a professor at Johns Hopkins University. Forster received a Bachelor of Arts from Swarthmore College. He completed his graduate studies at Harvard University, where he obtained an M.A. and Ph.D. From 1989 until 1990, Forster was a lecturer in history at Harvard. He became a professor at Connecticut College in 1990. In 2000, he was awarded a Guggenheim Fellowship to study German and East European history. In December 2005, Forster received a National Endowment for the Humanities Fellowship.

== Selected publications ==
=== Books ===
- Forster, Marc R. (July 1, 1992). The Counter-Reformation in the Villages: Religion and Reform in the Bishopric of Speyer, 1560-1720. Cornell University Press. ISBN 978-0801425660.
- Forster, Marc R. (February 5, 2001). Catholic Revival in the Age of the Baroque: Religious Identity in Southwest Germany, 1550–1750. Cambridge University Press. ISBN 978-0521780445.
- Forster, Marc R. (2002). "Debating the Meaning of Pilgrimage: Maria Steinbach 1733". In Van Horn Melton, James (ed.). Cultures of Communication from Reformation to Enlightenment. Routledge. pp. 93–103. doi:10.4324/9781315258669-8. ISBN 9781315258669.
- Kaplan, Benjamin J.; Forster, Marc R., eds. (2005). Piety and Family in Early Modern Europe. London: Routledge. doi:10.4324/9781315246819. ISBN 9781315246819.
- Forster, Marc R. (October 15, 2007). "Taverns and Inns in the German Countryside: Male Honor and Public Space". In Ocker, Christopher; Printy, Michael; Starenko, Peter; Wallace, Peter (eds.). Politics and Reformations: Communities, Polities, Nations, and Empires. Brill Publishers. pp. 229–238. doi:10.1163/ej.9789004161733.i-630.51. ISBN 978-90-47-42224-2.
- Forster, Marc R. (November 19, 2007). Catholic Germany from the Reformation to the Enlightenment. Palgrave Macmillan. ISBN 978-0333698389.
- Forster, Marc R. (May 26, 2024). Keeping Peace in the Village:Conflict and Peacemaking in Germany, 1650-1750. Oxford University Press. ISBN 9780198898474.

=== Journals ===
- Forster, Marc R. (1993). "The Elite and Popular Foundations of German Catholicism in the Age of Confessionalism: The Reichskirche". Central European History. 26 (3): 311–325. doi:10.1017/S0008938900009158. JSTOR 4546349.
- Forster, Marc R. (January 1997). "With and Without Confessionalization. Varieties of Early Modern German Catholicism". Journal of Early Modern History. 1 (4): 315–343. doi:10.1163/157006597X00127.
- Forster, Marc R. (1998). "Clericalism and Communalism in German Catholicism". Infinite Boundaries. Kirksville, MO: Sixteenth Century Journal Publishers: 55–76.
- Forster, Marc R. (2009). "Space, Gender, and Honor in Village Taverns". Food & History. 7 (2): 15–28. doi:10.1484/J.FOOD.1.100648.

==== Reviews ====
- Forster, Marc R. (August 1, 2008). "Katholische Reform und Konfessionalisierung". The English Historical Review (Book Review). 123 (503): 1025–1026. doi:10.1093/ehr/cen225.
- Forster, Marc R. (April 1, 2009). "Catholic Belief and Survival in Late Sixteenth-Century Vienna: The Case of Georg Eder (1523-87)". The English Historical Review (Book Review). 124 (507): 424–425. doi:10.1093/ehr/cep057.
- Forster, Marc R. (April 1, 2010). "Converting Bohemia: Force and Persuasion in the Catholic Reformation". The English Historical Review (Book Review). 125 (513): 434–436. doi:10.1093/ehr/ceq056.
- Forster, Marc R. (December 1, 2011). "Die frühe Neuzeit als Epoche". The English Historical Review (Book Review). 126 (523): 1519–1521. doi:10.1093/ehr/cer286.
- Forster, Marc R. (January 18, 2016). "Women and the Counter-Reformation in Early Modern Münster". The English Historical Review (Book Review). 130 (547): 1546–1547. doi:10.1093/ehr/cev290.
- Forster, Marc R. (June 25, 2019). "Reformation und alter Glaube: Zugehörigkeiten der Altgläubigen im Alten Reich und in Frankreich (1517–1540)". The English Historical Review (Book Review). 134 (569): 981–983. doi:10.1093/ehr/cez165.
