= Foster, Clark County, Wisconsin =

Town in Clark County, Wisconsin

Foster, Wisconsin
- Town
- Town of Foster
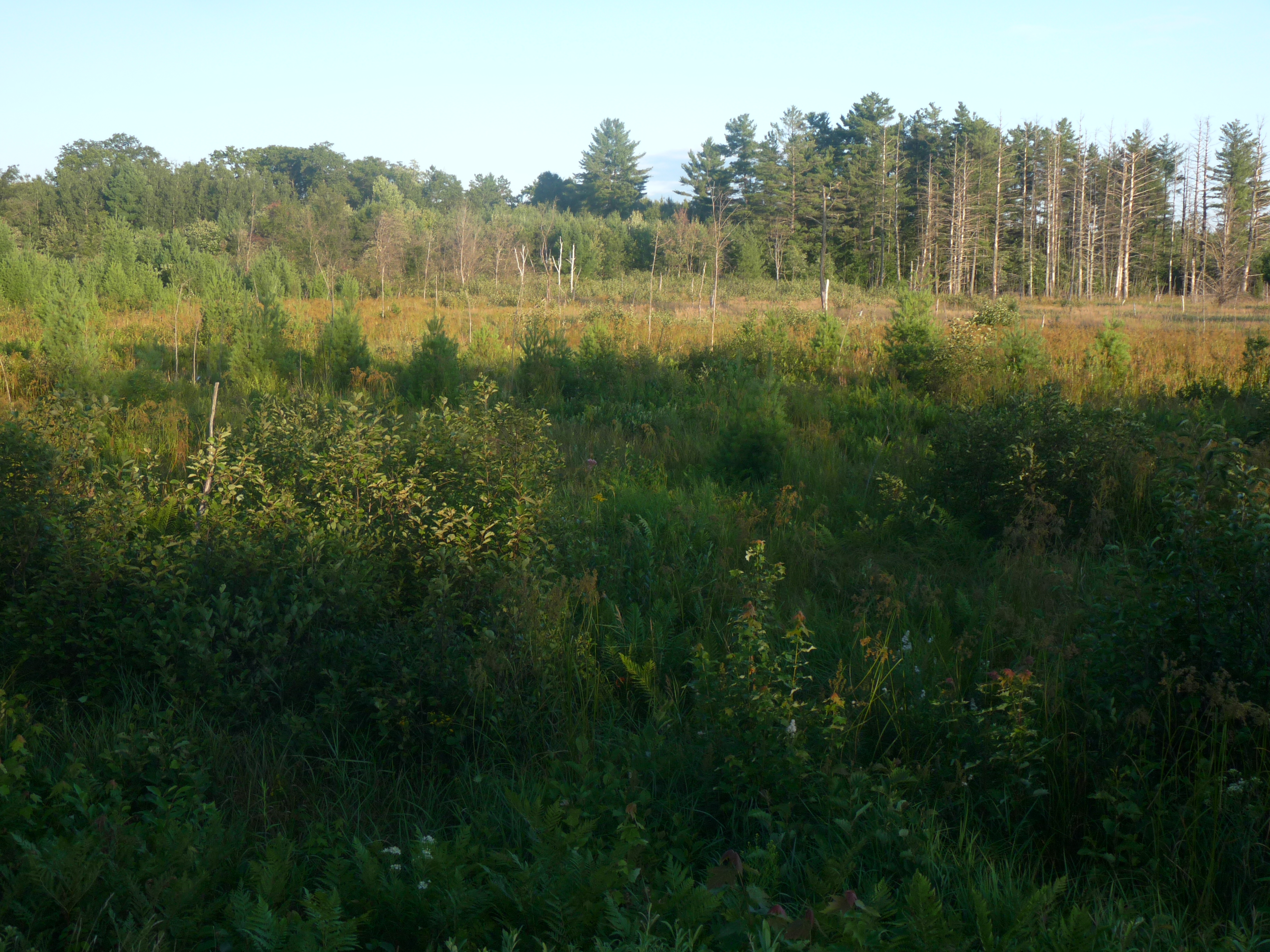
- Much of Foster is county forest land - wooded or boggy.

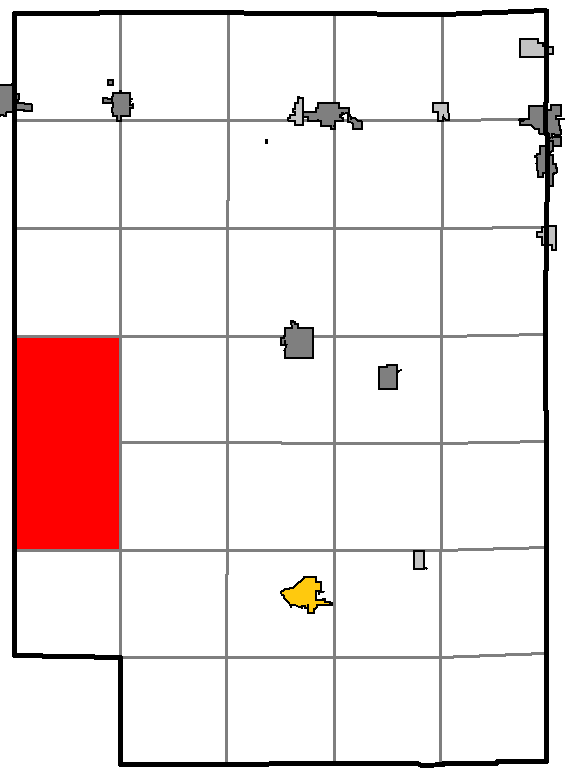
- Location of Foster, Clark County

- Location of Clark County, Wisconsin
- Coordinates: 44.6875°N 90.8636°W
- Country: United States
- State: Wisconsin
- County: Clark

Area
  - Total: 71.77 sq mi (185.9 km^{2})
  - Land: 71.16 sq mi (184.3 km^{2})
  - Water: 0.61 sq mi (1.6 km^{2})

Population (2020)
  - Total: 118
  - Density: 1.66/sq mi (0.640/km^{2})
- Time zone: UTC-6 (Central (CST))
  - Summer (DST): UTC-5 (CDT)
- Area code(s): 715 and 534
- GNIS feature ID: 1583221
- Website: https://www.fostertownshipwi.com/

Foster is a town in Clark County in the U.S. state of Wisconsin. The population was 95 at the 2010 census, unchanged from the 2000 census. By the 2020 census, the population increased to 118.

== Geography ==
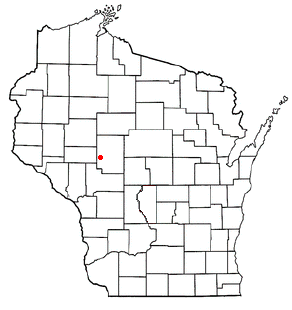
Location of Foster, Wisconsin

The town of Foster is located along the western edge of Clark County and is bordered to the west by Eau Claire County. According to the United States Census Bureau, the Town of Foster has a total area of 71.6 square miles (185.4 km^{2}), of which 71.0 square miles (183.8 km^{2}) is land and 0.62 square miles (1.6 km^{2}), or 0.85%, is water.

== Demographics ==
As of the census of 2000, there were 95 people, 50 households, and 33 families residing in the town. The population density was 1.3 people per square mile (0.5/km^{2}). There were 145 housing units at an average density of 2.0 per square mile (0.8/km^{2}). The racial makeup of the town was 98.95% White, and 1.05% from two or more races. Hispanic or Latino of any race were 4.21% of the population.

There were 50 households, out of which 10.0% had children under the age of 18 living with them, 56.0% were married couples living together, 2.0% had a female householder with no husband present, and 34.0% were non-families. 32.0% of all households were made up of individuals, and 16.0% had someone living alone who was 65 years of age or older. The average household size was 1.90 and the average family size was 2.27.

In the town, the population was spread out, with 8.4% under the age of 18, 6.3% from 18 to 24, 23.2% from 25 to 44, 37.9% from 45 to 64, and 24.2% who were 65 years of age or older. The median age was 50 years. For every 100 females, there were 106.5 males. For every 100 females age 18 and over, there were 102.3 males.

The median income for a household in the town was $28,750, and the median income for a family was $31,964. Males had a median income of $16,250 versus $16,250 for females. The per capita income for the town was $17,039. There were no families and 3.6% of the population living below the poverty line, including no under eighteens and 13.0% of those over 64.
