= Vorster =

Vorster (pronounced for-ster) is a surname. Notable people with the surname include:

- Balthazar Johannes Vorster (1915–1983), South African politician, Prime Minister and President
- Eben Vorster (born 1997), South African swimmer
- Elinda Vorster (born 1965), South African sprinter
- Emil Vorster (1910–1976), German racing driver and entrepreneur
- Harold Vorster (born 1993), South African rugby player
- Julius Vorster (1809–1876), German chemist and entrepreneur. One of the founders of Chemische Fabrik Kalk
- Louis Vorster (1966–2012), South African-Namibian cricketer
- Pankraz Vorster (1753–1829), Swiss bishop. The last abbot of the Abbey of Saint Gall
- Pierre Vorster (born 1969), South African high jumper, African Champion 1995

== See also ==
- Forster (surname)
