= Wolfgang Foerster =

German officer and military historian

Wolfgang Foerster (born 4 August 1875 in Breslau; died 14 October 1963 in Icking) was a German officer and military historian. His biography of General Ludwig Beck provided important source material for William Shirer's seminal book, "The Rise and Fall of the Third Reich".

== Life ==
Wolfgang Foerster, the younger brother of Otfried Foerster, left school in 1894 and joined the Prussian army as an officer cadet (Fahnenjunker). He went on to pursue a career in the army general staff. During the First World War, Foerster served in the general staff of the 5th Army Corps and later became head of the general staff of the 66th Generalkommando. In 1920 he was discharged from military service with the rank of Lieutenant-Colonel (Oberstleutnant).

He moved directly into the role of senior archivist at the Reichsarchiv. There, in 1931, Foerster became director of the history department and, then, in 1937, director of the Research Institute for Army and War History (Forschungsanstalt für Heeres- und Kriegsgeschichte), renamed the War History Research Institute (Kriegsgeschichtliche Forschungsanstalt des Heeres) later that year. Finally, in 1944, he was awarded the title of professor; a position he held until his retirement the following year. He died on 14 October 1963, at the age of 88, in Icking.

== Writing ==
Following the end of the Second World War, Foerster wrote a biography on the life of General Ludwig Beck, who had been executed in 1944 for his involvement in the 20 July Plot. The book was a source for William Shirer's book "The Rise and Fall of the Third Reich", and was especially important in explaining the events leading up the dismissal of General Werner von Blomberg, the Minister of War (Reichskriegsminister) and head of the Wehrmacht, in early 1938.

== General references ==
- Der deutsche Zusammenbruch 1918. Verlag Eisenschmidt, Berlin 1925.
- Der Feldherr Ludendorff im Unglück. Eine Studie über seine seelische Haltung in der Endphase des ersten Weltkrieges. Limes-Verlag, Wiesbaden 1952.
- Generaloberst Ludwig Beck. Sein Kampf gegen den Krieg; aus nachgelassenen Papieren des Generalstabschefs. Isar-Verlag, München 1953 (früherer Titel Ein General kämpft gegen den Krieg).
- Graf Schlieffen und der Weltkrieg. Verlag Mittler, Berlin 1921 (3 Bde.)
1. Die deutsche Westoffensive 1914 bis zur Marneschlacht. 1921.
2. Die Ostoffensive 1915 in Galizien und in Rußland. 1921.
3. Verdun 1916. 1921.
- Moltke. Persönlichkeit und Werk. Limpert Verlag, Berlin 1941.
- Prinz Friedrich Karl von Preußen. Denkwürdigkeiten aus seinem Leben. DVA, Stuttgart 1910/11 (2.Bde.).
- Als Herausgeber: Kämpfer an vergessenen Fronten. Feldzugsbriefe, Kriegstagebücher und Berichte. Kolonialkrieg, Seekrieg, Luftkrieg, Spionage, Berlin (Deutsche Buchvertriebsstelle. Abteilung für Veröffentlichungen aus amtlichen Archiven) 1931.

== Sources ==
- Horstenau, Edmund Glaise von (1988). Deutscher Bevollmächtigter General in Kroatien und Zeuge des Untergangs des "Tausendjährigen Reiches" (Ein General im Zwielicht. Die Erinnerungen Edmund Glaises von Horstenau; Bd. 3). Vienna: Peter Broucek. ISBN 3-205-08749-6.
- Weinberg, Gerhard (2005). Brockhaus Enzyklopädie, 21st Edition. Frankfurt: Brockhaus. ISBN 3-765-34142-8.
- Pöhlmann, Markus (2002). Kriegsgeschichte und Geschichtspolitik: Der Erste Weltkrieg: Die amtliche deutsche Militärgeschichtsschreibung 1914-1956. Paderborn: Ferdinand Schöningh. ISBN 3-506-74481-X.
