= Foster (given name) =

The given name Foster is a variation of the surname Forster, meaning one who 'works in the forest'. It may also derive from the French forcetier, meaning 'maker of scissors'. It is both a given name and a surname.

The use of Foster as a given name has increased in recent years, and was the 1063rd most popular boys name in 2022, up 251 spots from 2021.

== Notable people with the given name "Foster" include ==
=== A ===
- Foster Awintiti Akugri (born 1994), Ghanaian entrepreneur
- Foster Andersen (1940–2014), American football player
- Foster Appiah (born 2000), Ghanaian footballer

=== B ===
- Foster Bastios (born 1975), Ghanaian footballer
- Foster Bell (1814–1857), British jockey
- Foster Blackburne (1838–1909), English archdeacon
- Foster Blodgett (1827–1877), American politician
- Foster Brooks (1912–2001), American actor

=== C ===
- Foster Calder (1873–1960), Canadian politician
- Foster Campbell (born 1947), American politician
- Foster Castleman (1931–2020), American baseball player
- Foster Samuel Chipman (1829–??), American politician
- Foster Dwight Coburn (1846–1924), American farmer
- Foster Cummings (born 1973), Trinidadian politician
- Foster Cunliffe (1875–1916), English historian
- Foster Cunliffe (rugby union) (1854–1927), English rugby union footballer

=== D ===
- Foster DeWitt (born 1996), Canadian rugby union footballer
- Foster Rhea Dulles (1900–1970), American journalist
- Foster A. Dunlap (1905–1978), American politician

=== E ===
- Foster Edwards (1903–1980), American baseball player

=== F ===
- Foster Felger (1908–1984), American politician
- Foster Fitzsimmons (1912–1991), American novelist
- Foster Friess (1940–2021), American investment manager
- Foster Furcolo (1911–1995), American politician
- Foster Fyans (1790–1870), Irish military officer

=== G ===
- Foster Griffin (born 1995), American baseball player
- Foster Gunnison Jr. (1925–1994), American activist

=== H ===
- Foster Hedley (1908–1983), English footballer
- Foster Hewitt (1902–1985), Canadian radio broadcaster
- Foster Hirsch (born 1943), American author
- Foster Horan (born 1992), Irish rugby union footballer
- Foster Hutchinson (1724–1799), American judge
- Foster Hutchinson (Canadian judge) (1761–1815), Canadian judge

=== L ===
- Foster C. LaHue (1917–1996), American general
- Foster Langsdorf (born 1995), American soccer player
- Foster Loyer (born 1999), American basketball player

=== M ===
- Foster Malone (1887–1926), Canadian ice hockey player
- Foster G. McGaw (1897–1986), American philanthropist
- Foster E. Mohrhardt (1907–1992), American librarian
- Foster Moreau (born 1997), American football player

=== N ===
- Foster Namwera (born 1986), Malawian footballer

=== P ===
- Foster B. Porter (1891–1965), American politician
- Foster Powell (1734–1793), English athlete
- Foster Provost, American computer scientist

=== R ===
- Foster Robinson (1880–1967), English cricketer
- Foster Rockwell (1880–1942), American football player

=== S ===
- Foster Sarell (born 1998), American football player
- Foster J. Sayers (1924–1944), American soldier
- Foster Waterman Stearns (1881–1956), American politician
- Foster Stockwell (1929-2023), American writer
- Foster Sylvers (born 1962), American singer-songwriter

=== V ===
- Foster McGowan Voorhees (1865–1927), American politician

=== W ===
- Foster Watkins (1917–2002), American football player
- Foster Neville Woodward (1905–1985), British chemist

=== Z ===
- Foster Barham Zincke (1817–1893), English clergyman

== Fictional characters ==
- Foster from GO Jetters (although they call him Foz)

== See also ==
- Foster (surname), a page for people with the surname "Foster"
- Foster (disambiguation), a disambiguation page for "Foster"
