= Milton House =

Milton House may refer to:

in Australia

- Milton House (Melbourne), Victoria
- Milton House, Milton, in Milton, Queensland

in the United States

- Milton House (Denver, Colorado) in Potter Highlands Historic District, a Denver Landmark, designed by Glen Huntington
- Milton Town House, Milton, New Hampshire, listed on the National Register of Historic Places (NRHP)
- Milton Hall, Washington, D.C., NRHP-listed
- Milton House (Milton, Wisconsin), NRHP-listed

== See also ==
- Milton Historic District (disambiguation)
- Milton Center Historic District, Milton, Connecticut, NRHP-listed
- Milton Centre Historic District, Milton, Massachusetts, NRHP-listed
- Milton College Historic District, Milton, Wisconsin, NRHP-listed in Rock County
- Milton Hill Historic District, Milton, Massachusetts, NRHP-listed
