= Dr. Amos Holbrook House =

Historic house in Massachusetts, United States

- U.S. National Register of Historic Places
- U.S. Historic district – Contributing property
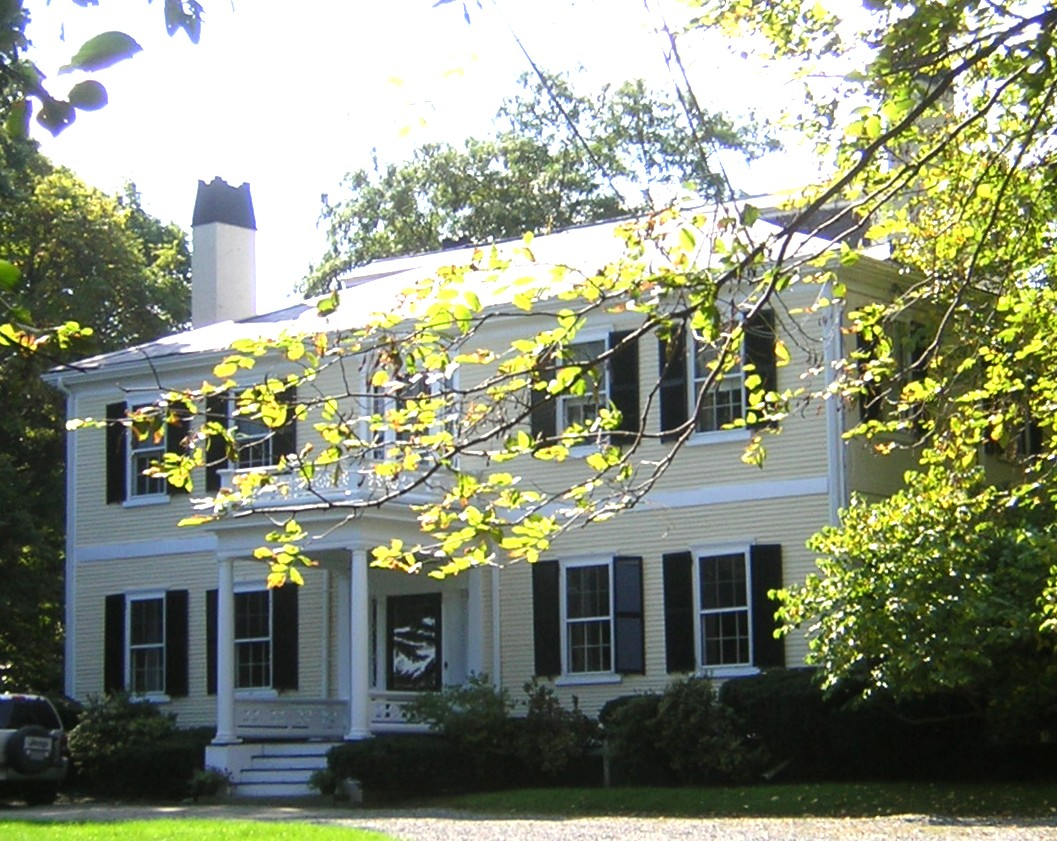

- Location within Massachusetts Location within the United States
- Location: 203 Adams St., Milton, Massachusetts
- Coordinates: 42°15′55″N 71°3′57″W
- Area: 5 acres (2.0 ha)
- Built: 1800
- Architectural style: Federal
- Part of: Milton Hill Historic District (ID95000698)
- NRHP reference No.: 75000289

Significant dates
- Added to NRHP: February 13, 1975
- Designated CP: June 9, 1995

The Dr. Amos Holbrook House is a historic house at 203 Adams Street in Milton, Massachusetts. It was built about 1800 by Dr. Amos Holbrook, a pioneer in the propagation of smallpox inoculations as a means of improving public health. The house has retained many interior finish details from the Federal period, including unique trompe-l'œil frescoes. Holbrook was a pioneer in the field of public health, advocating for small pox inoculations. The house listed on the National Register of Historic Places in 1975, and was included in the Milton Hill Historic District in 1995.

== Description and history ==
The Holbrook House occupies a prominent property on the south side of Adams Street at the summit of Milton Hill, on 5 acres (2.0 ha) that was formerly part of the estate of colonial governor Thomas Hutchinson (and is across the street from Governor Hutchinson's Field). The house is a two-story brick structure, five bays wide and three deep, with a clapboarded exterior and hip roof. The roof is pierced by symmetrically placed chimneys, and dormers are set on the sides of the roof. The main entrance is at the center of the main facade, sheltered by a later Victorian porch with Doric columns and balustrade. The interior halls and dining room retain early 19th-century frescoes that are believed to have been executed by Italian craftsmen.

The house was built about 1800 by Dr. Amos Holbrook, a prominent local physician. Holbrook provided medical services during the American Revolutionary War, and advocated in the town for inoculation against smallpox. His success in this endeavor prompted the state to adopt wider-ranging public health measures advocating the practice.

The house was acquired in 1973 by the museum owners of the nearby Captain Robert Bennet Forbes House to prevent the property from being redeveloped. It has since been returned to private residential use.

== See also ==
- National Register of Historic Places listings in Milton, Massachusetts
