= Milton Historic District =

Milton Historic District may refer to:

- Milton Center Historic District, Milton, Connecticut, listed on the National Register of Historic Places (NRHP)
- Milton Historic District (Milton, Delaware), NRHP-listed
- Milton Historic District (Milton, Florida), NRHP-listed
- Milton Centre Historic District, Milton, Massachusetts, NRHP-listed
- Milton Hill Historic District, Milton, Massachusetts, NRHP-listed
- Milton Historic District (Milton, North Carolina), NRHP-listed
- Milton Historic District (Milton, Pennsylvania), NRHP-listed
- Milton College Historic District, Milton, Wisconsin, NRHP-listed in Rock County

== See also ==
- Milton House (disambiguation)
