= Governor Hutchinson's Field =

Nature reserve in Massachusetts, US

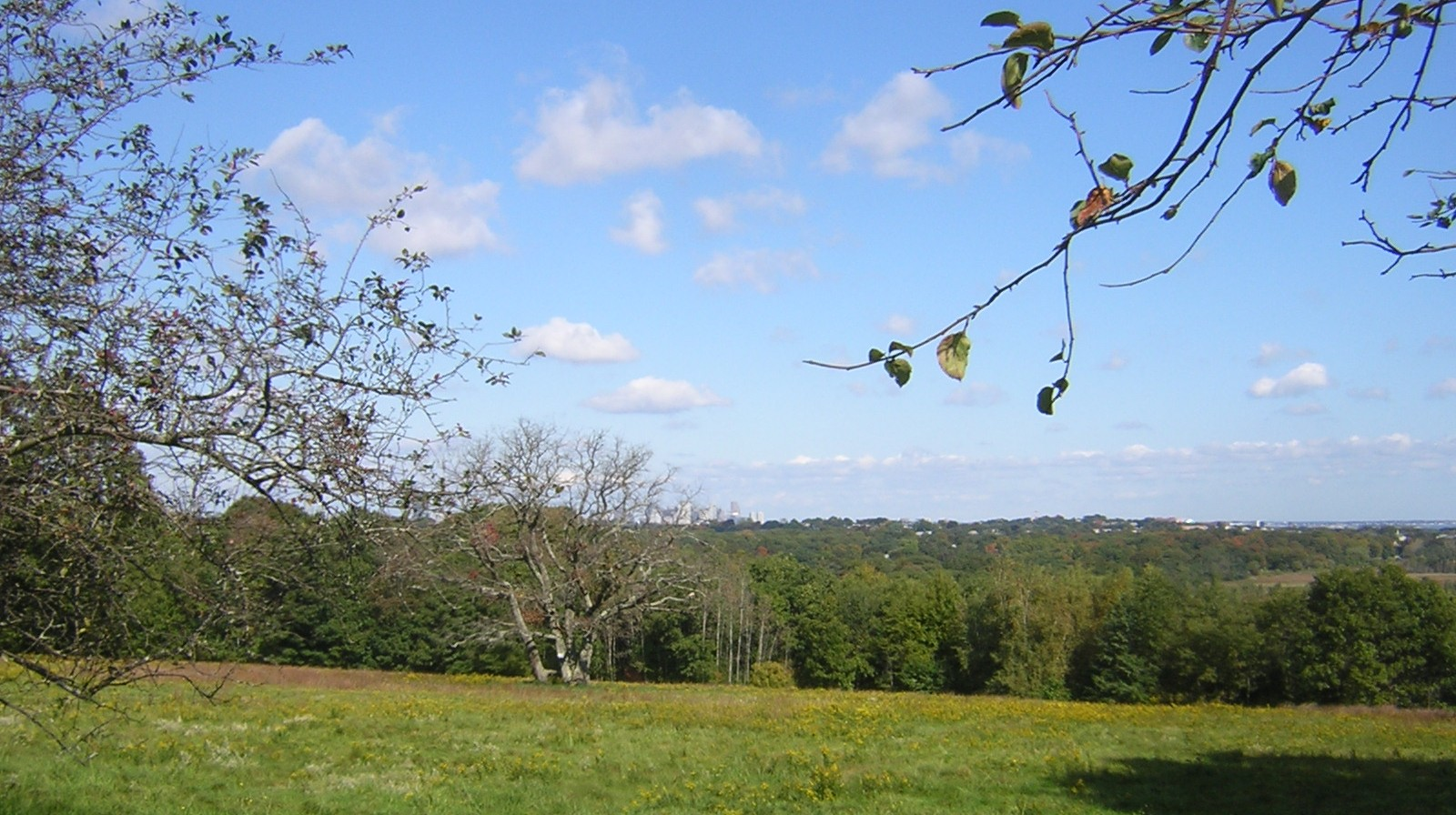
Boston skyscrapers in the center

Governor Hutchinson's Field is a nature reserve located in Milton, Massachusetts. The field is owned by The Trustees of Reservations. The property is the only means of public access to another Trustees property, the otherwise inaccessible Pierce Reservation.

== History ==
In 1734, Thomas Hutchinson, last civilian royal governor of Massachusetts, built a country estate on the property. The two remaining parts of the estate are the field, which affords sweeping views of Boston and Quincy and a ha-ha which is now on the property of St. Michael's Episcopal Church, a block away from the field. (A ha-ha is a sunken wall which permits unblocked views, while still serving functions of a wall such as delineating a border and preventing livestock from crossing.)

The field was an orchard during Hutchinson's time, but became open land during the 19th century. The Trustees of Reservations acquired the field in 1898, and it is open to the public for passive recreational purposes. The adjacent Pierce Reservation land was given to the Trustees in 1957.

== Getting there ==
The field, with its view of Boston, is on Adams Street at the top of Milton Hill, opposite the Capt. Robert B. Forbes House and the Dr. Amos Holbrook House, both of which are also on the National Register of Historic Places. The field is a contributing property to the Milton Hill Historic District.
