= Foster Hutchinson (Canadian judge) =

Canadian politician

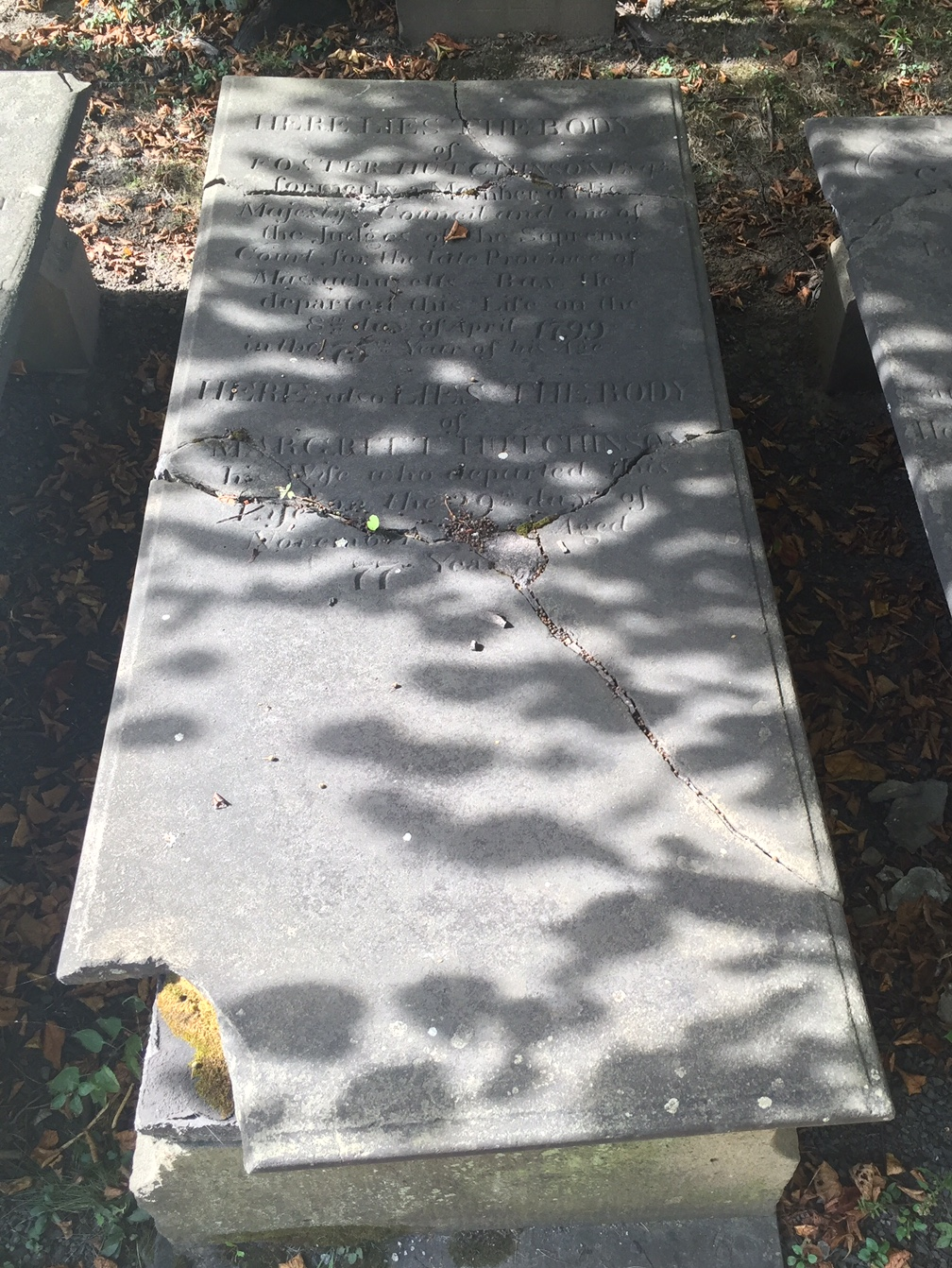
Foster Hutchinson's father Foster Sr., d. 1799, was a Loyalist who moved to Halifax, Old Burying Ground (Halifax, Nova Scotia)

Foster Hutchinson Jr. (1761-28 November 1815) was a member of the 9th General Assembly of Nova Scotia representing Halifax Township 1806–1811, was appointed to the Nova Scotia Council in 1813, and was appointed a Puisne judge of the Supreme Court of Nova Scotia in 1810.

He was the only son of Foster Hutchinson, Sr., the nephew of Governor of Massachusetts Thomas Hutchinson and grandchild of Governor of Nova Scotia Paul Mascarene. He arrived in Halifax from Boston with his father as Loyalists (1776). Hutchinson became a lawyer and worked under Chief Justice Thomas Andrew Lumisden Strange. Sir George Prevost appointed him an Assistant Justice to the Supreme Court (1809). He is buried in the Old Burying Ground (Halifax, Nova Scotia).

== See also ==
- Nova Scotia in the American Revolution
