= Gov. Thomas Hutchinson's Ha-ha =

- U.S. National Register of Historic Places
- U.S. Historic district – Contributing property
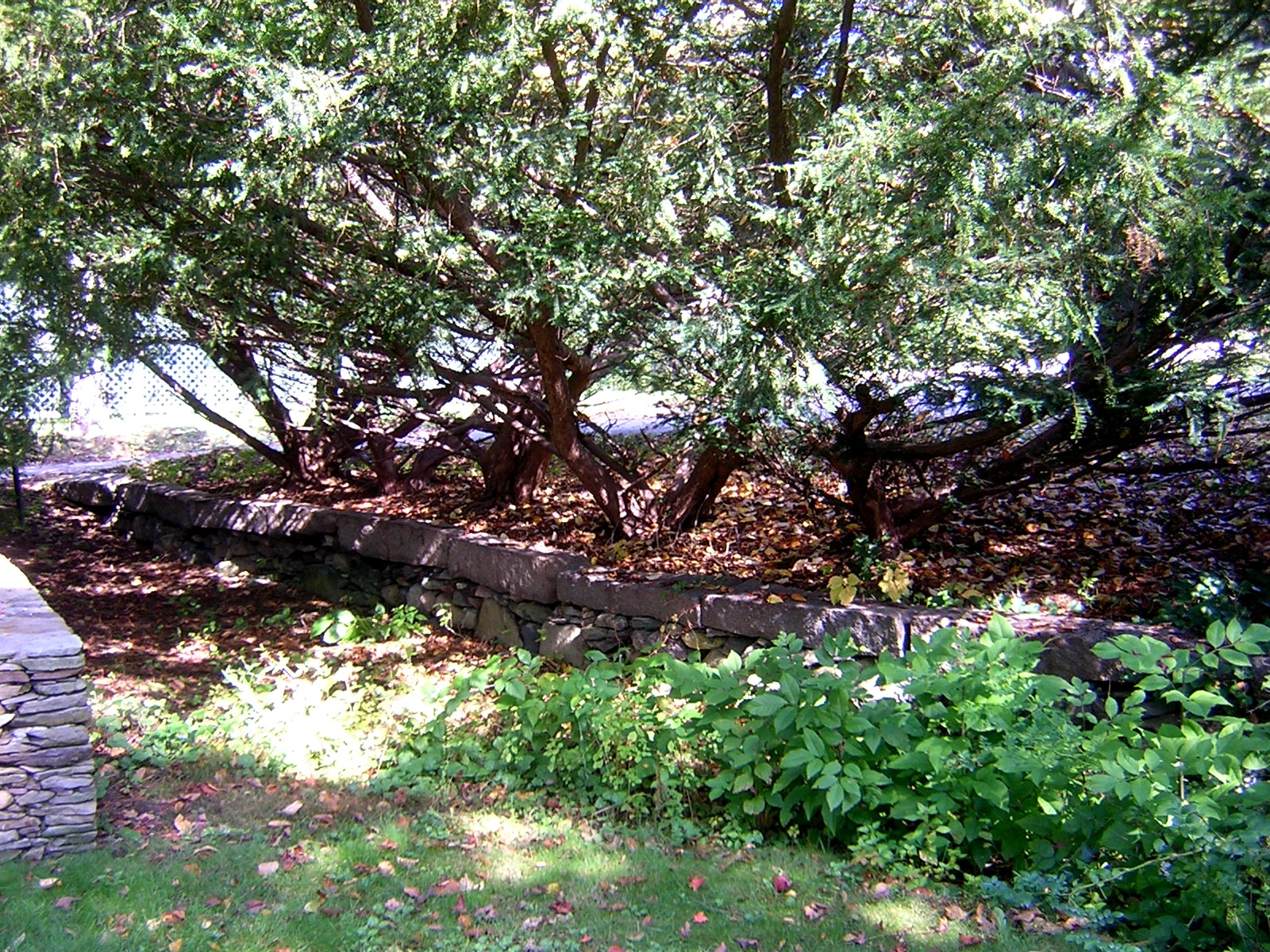

- Location within Massachusetts Location within the United States
- Location: 100-122 Randolph Ave., Milton, Massachusetts
- Coordinates: 42°15′55″N 71°4′4″W
- Area: less than one acre
- Built: 1771
- Part of: Milton Hill Historic District (ID95000698)
- NRHP reference No.: 75000290

Significant dates
- Added to NRHP: February 13, 1975
- Designated CP: June 9, 1995

Gov. Thomas Hutchinson's Ha-ha is a historic ha-ha at 100–122 Randolph Avenue in Milton, Massachusetts, United States. Probably built about 1771, it is the only surviving structure of the once-extensive estate of Thomas Hutchinson, the last civilian colonial governor of the British Province of Massachusetts Bay, and one of the few examples of an early ha-ha in North America. It was added to the National Register of Historic Places in 1975, and is a contributing property to the Milton Hill Historic District.

== Description and history ==
A ha-ha is a sunken wall which permits unblocked views, while still serving functions of a wall such as delineating a border or preventing livestock from accessing portions of a larger estate. This ha-ha, which is of modest size, is located on the grounds of St. Michael's Church at 100 Randolph Avenue, approximately one block from Governor Hutchinson's Field, a property of The Trustees of Reservations that was also once part of Hutchinson's estate. The ha-ha is marked by a descriptive sign.

The ha-ha is about 120 feet (37 m) long, and is in appearance a stone-lined ditch 6 feet (1.8 m) wide and 4 feet (1.2 m) deep, running roughly north-south. One side of the ditch is slanted and lined with puddingstone. The top of the slant is finished with cut granite blocks. The ha-ha originally lined the western edge of Hutchinson's formal garden; this garden survived into the 20th century, but a house has since been built on the site.

The ha-ha was constructed by then-Acting Governor Thomas Hutchinson, probably about 1771. It was around this time that Horace Walpole published a book which contained a detailed description of ha-has and their function enhancing the aesthetics of large estates.

== See also ==
- National Register of Historic Places listings in Milton, Massachusetts
