= Foster Awintiti Akugri =

Ghanaian entrepreneur

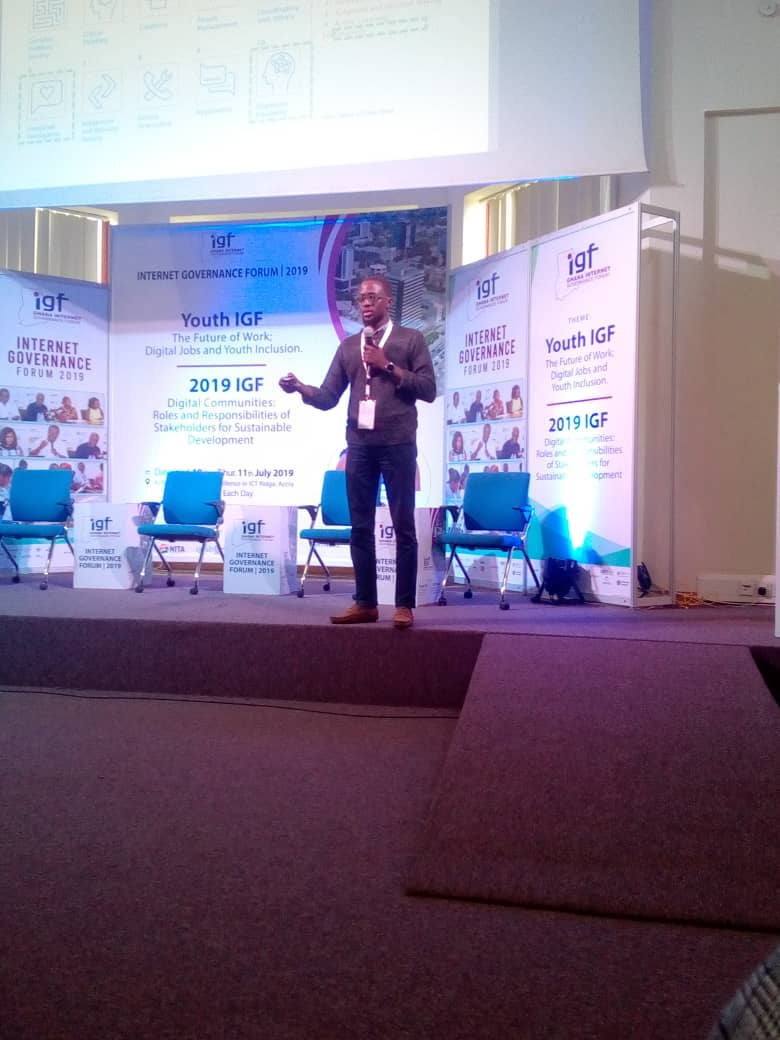
- Foster Akugri at the Ghana Internet Governance Forum, Accra
- Born: 24 November 1994 (age 31); Zebilla Natinga
- Citizenship: Ghanaian
- Education: Bachelors Computer Science MBA Business Process Management
- Occupation: Technology Entrepreneur
- Known for: Hacklab Foundation, Ecosystem Building in Africa
- Website: http://fosterakugri.com

Foster Awintiti Akugri (born 24 November 1994) is a Ghanaian entrepreneur and the founder and president of Hacklab Foundation, a non-profit organisation that promotes and empowers young entrepreneurs using technology in Ghana to solve local issues and create jobs. He is a World Economic Forum Global Shaper. He was the youngest participant at the World Economic Forum's 48th Annual Meeting, Davos, Switzerland in 2018. Driven by his life's purpose to helping people find their path, Foster launched GrowthWithTiti in January 2021, an initiative with the mission to break down the complexities of finding your purpose, defining your mission, and navigating the grey to crush your goals. He hopes to leverage this platform to reach and impact one million people by 2025.

== Early life and education ==
Foster is a graduate from Kwame Nkrumah University of Science and Technology with a Bachelors in Computer Science. He also holds an MBA in Business Process Management and currently pursuing a certification in Six Sigma lack Belt. He also holds professional certificates in Computer Security from Microsoft, Six Sigma Black Belt, Global Governance, Sustainable Management, Financial Management, SAFe 4 Scaled Agile Practitioner, Business Storytelling, and Strategic Negotiations.

== Career ==
Foster Awintiti Akugri is the Founder & President of the Hacklab Foundation. He is currently the Incubator Manager for the Stanbic Bank Incubator Ghana (SBIncubator Ghana), an initiative of Stanbic Bank Ghana Limited, a member of the Standard Bank Group. He also serves as a member of the Malaika Coalition, a committee mandated by the Africa Regional Strategy Group of the World Economic Forum to work on the Africa 4.0 Initiative. He also serves on the Africa Growth Platform Working Group and was part of the team that lead the Digital Campaign Launch of the Platform during the World Economic Forum on Africa - Cape Town in September 2019.

== Honours and recognition ==
He was listed among 30 under 30 Future of Ghana Pioneers Class of 2019. Also named Atlantic Dialogues Emerging Leader Class of 2019 by the Policy Center for the Global South, Morocco. In 2019, he was also named amongst Top 100 Most Influential Young Ghanaians and Top 4 Most Influential Young Ghanaians in Science & Technology by Avance Media. He also received the President's Outstanding Youth Prize in Science and Technology in 2019 by the Millennium Excellence Foundation.

In 2020, He was listed amongst Top 50 Young CEOs in Ghana by Avance Media. He has worked with tech startups for the last 4 years, helping them develop MVPs and Product-Market fit strategies. He is an advocate who believes in harnessing STEM to advance development in Africa by ensuring greater participation by young people.

His team emerged First Runner-up in the Stanbic Money App Challenge in 2016 with financial management and literacy App, ‘Sikapong’ meaning ‘Money School’. They later went on to win the Tertiary Category for the MTN Apps Challenge in 2016 with TeleKare, telemedicine AI based mobile and web application for primary and advisory healthcare services. He is a public speaker focusing on leadership, technology, entrepreneurship, smart industries, ecosystem development, digital transformation, education, youth engagement models and Concept of the African Dream. He is a 2x TEDx Speaker and has delivered over 40 keynotes.
