= Foster Hutchinson =

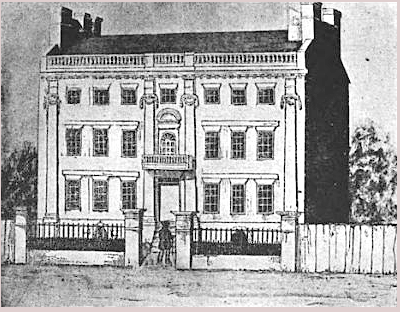
Birthplace of Foster Hutchinson, Foster Hutchinson House, Boston, Massachusetts, c. 1776, demolished 1833 The house is described as "one of the great lost pieces of architecture in Boston history"

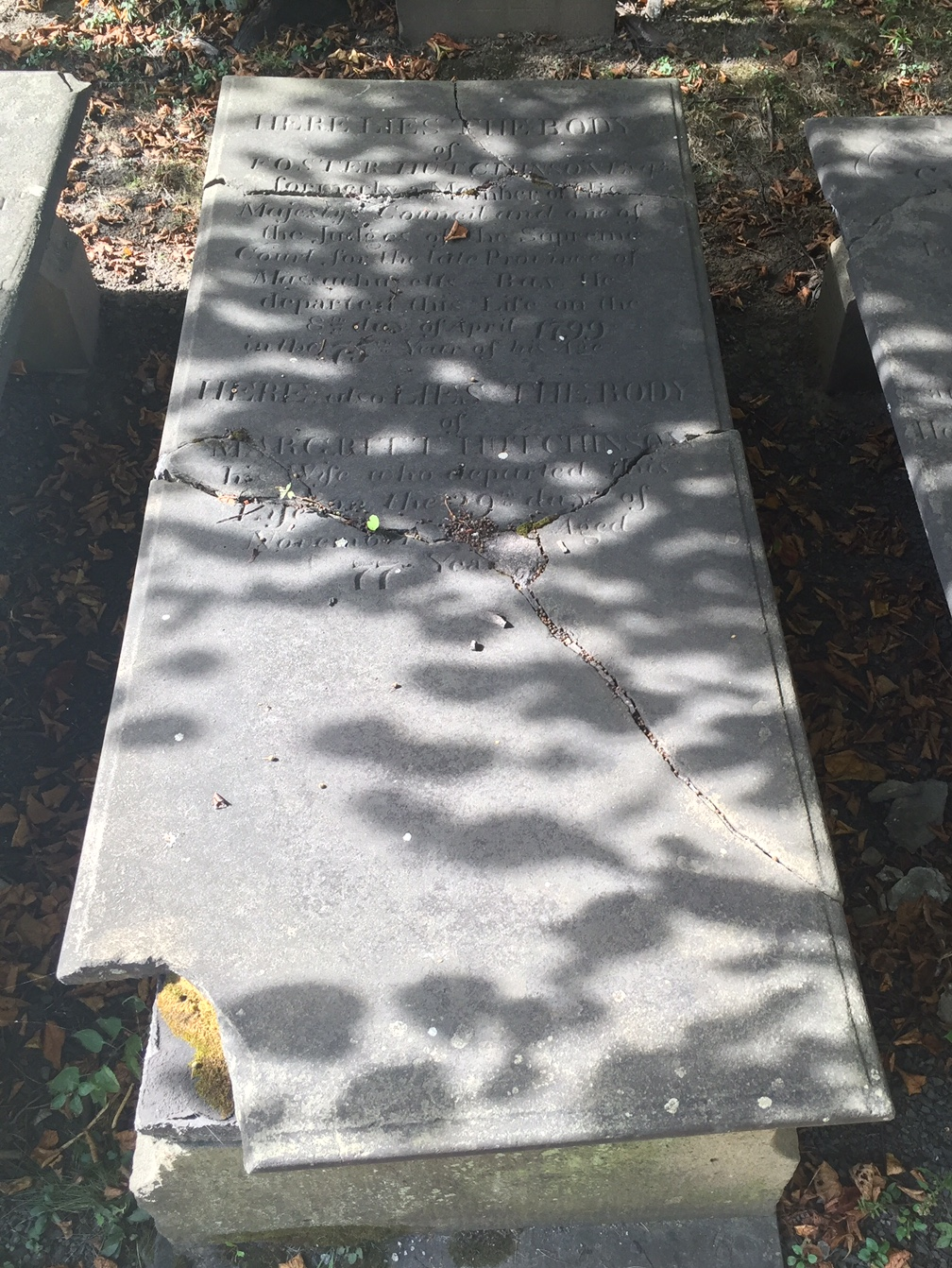
Foster Hutchinson Sr., d. 1799, Old Burying Ground (Halifax, Nova Scotia)

Foster Hutchinson (1724–1799) was an associate justice of Massachusetts Superior Court of Judicature, the highest court of the Province of Massachusetts Bay. One of five judges in Massachusetts at the time of the American Revolution, he remained loyal to Britain. He was a younger brother of Loyalist Massachusetts Governor Thomas Hutchinson. He was a graduate of Harvard University (1743). He escaped Boston as a loyalist in 1776 and settled in Halifax, Nova Scotia. He took the probate records of Suffolk Co. where he was Judge of Probate and never released them until 1784, when Benjamin Kent was able to procure their surrender. He re-printed examples of rebel propaganda in the local newspaper for which he later was forced to apologize. He was the father of Foster Hutchinson, also a jurist in Nova Scotia. He was buried in Halifax's Old Burying Ground.

== See also ==
- Nova Scotia in the American Revolution
