= Foster Namwera =

Malawian footballer

Personal information
- Date of birth: 19 September 1986 (age 40)
- Place of birth: Blantyre, Malawi
- Height: 1.80 m (5 ft 11 in)
- Position: Centre back

Senior career*
Years	Team	Apps	(Gls)
2008–2013	Mighty Wanderers		
2013–2015	Ferroviário Nampula		
2016–2018	Mighty Wanderers		

International career^{‡}
2006–2016	Malawi	21	(0)
- * Club domestic league appearances and goals as of 71 August 2021 ‡ National team caps and goals as of 7 August 2021

Foster Namwera (born 19 September 1986) is a retired Malawian football defender.
