= Milton Hill Historic District =

Historic district in Massachusetts, United States

- U.S. National Register of Historic Places
- U.S. Historic district
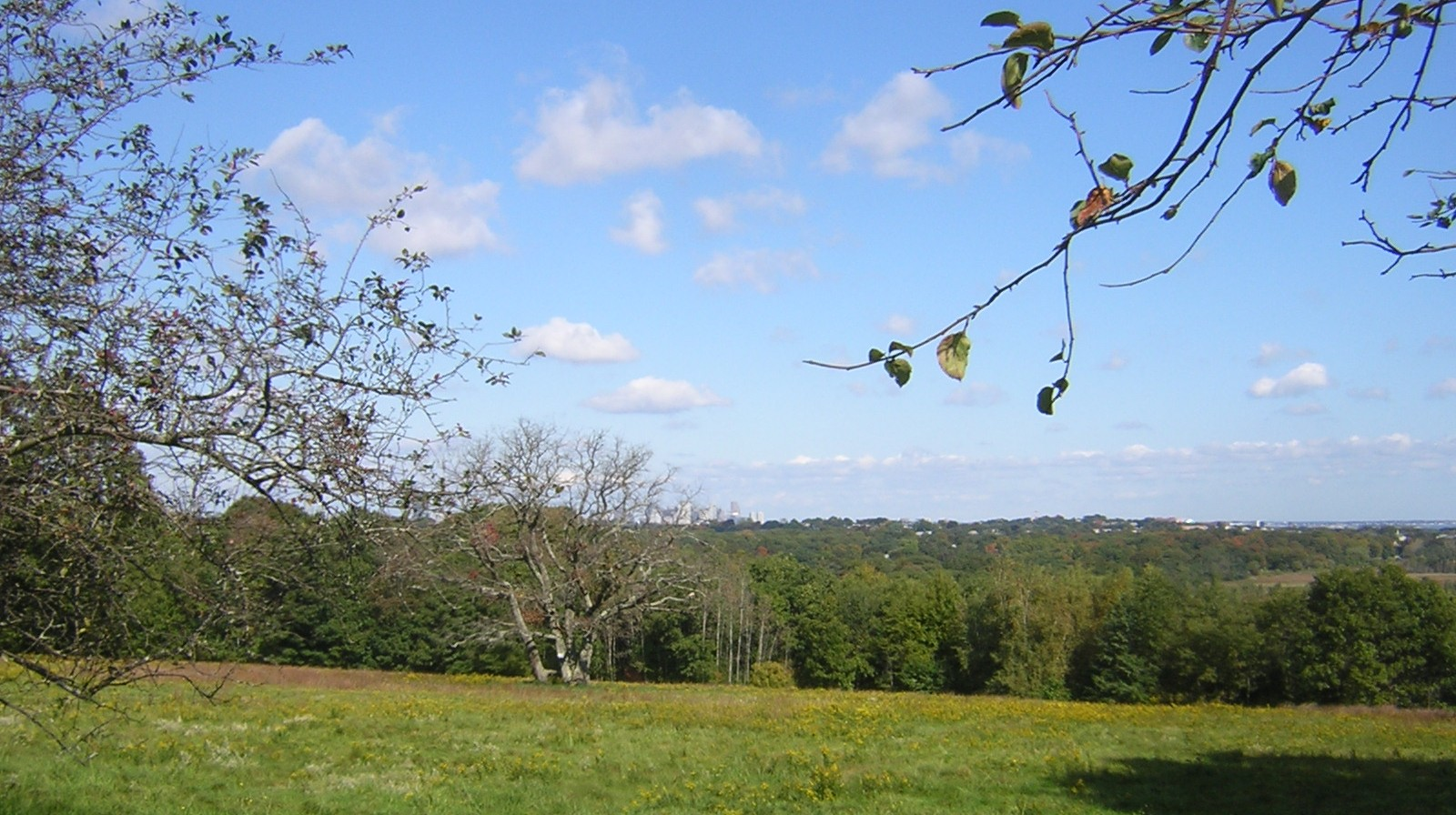
- Governor Thomas Hutchinson's Field

- Location within Massachusetts Location within the United States
- Location: Roughly bounded by Adams and School Sts., Randolph and Canton Aves. and Brook Rd., Milton, Massachusetts
- Coordinates: 42°15′52″N 71°3′59″W
- Area: 220.4 acres (89.2 ha)
- Architect: Cram and Ferguson; et al.
- Architectural style: Mid 19th Century Revival, Early Republic, Colonial
- NRHP reference No.: 95000698
- Added to NRHP: June 09, 1995

The Milton Hill Historic District is a historic district in Milton, Massachusetts. Extending mainly along Adams Street across the top of Milton Hill, it encompasses a residential area of high-style homes dating from the 18th to early 20th centuries. It was listed on the National Register of Historic Places in 1995.

== Description and history ==
Milton was settled by English colonists in 1634 as part of Dorchester, and was separately incorporated in 1662. Adams Street, the main thoroughfare on Milton Hill, was originally a native footpath, and became the main colonial route between Boston and Plymouth. Milton Village, set between Milton Hill and the Neponset River, developed as the town's principal commercial center, and the hill eventually became a residential area serving it.

The Milton Hill area first became prominent in the 1740s as the estate of Thomas Hutchinson, a prominent politician whose actions as Acting Governor and Governor of the Province of Massachusetts Bay heightened tensions leading to the American Revolutionary War. He left the province in 1774, and his estate was eventually confiscated by the state. In the 19th century his estate and other properties on the hill developed as fashionable residential area of the town, with fine views to Boston from the hill's summit area. Important buildings in the district include the Captain Robert Bennet Forbes House, a National Historic Landmark, and the Dr. Amos Holbrook House, both separately listed on the National Register of Historic Places. Governor Hutchinson's Ha-ha, a sunken stone wall section, is the only built remnant of Hutchinson's estate, although Governor Hutchinson's Field preserves part of his estate as open space for passive recreation.

== Gallery ==
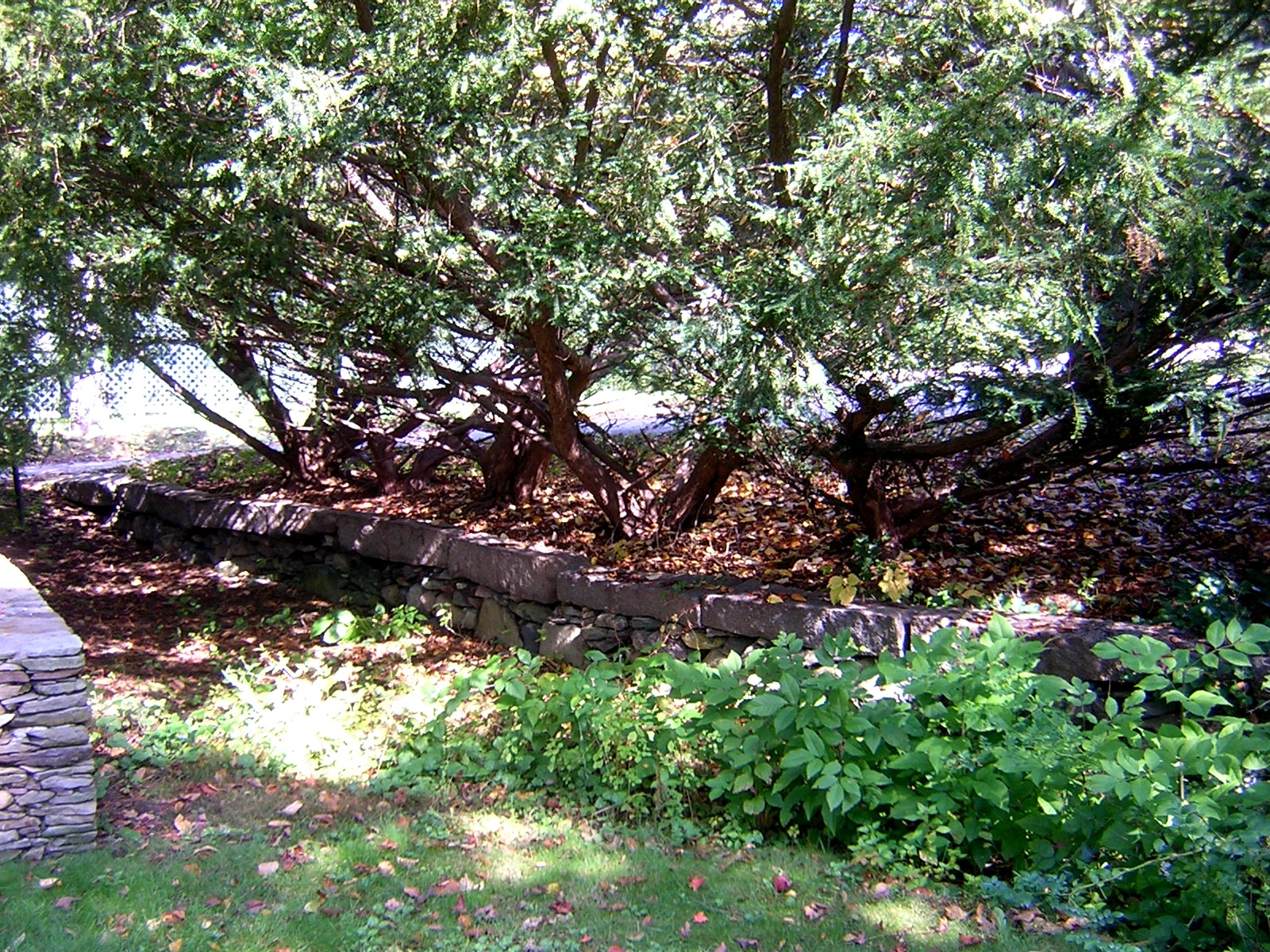
Gov. Hutchinson's Ha-ha

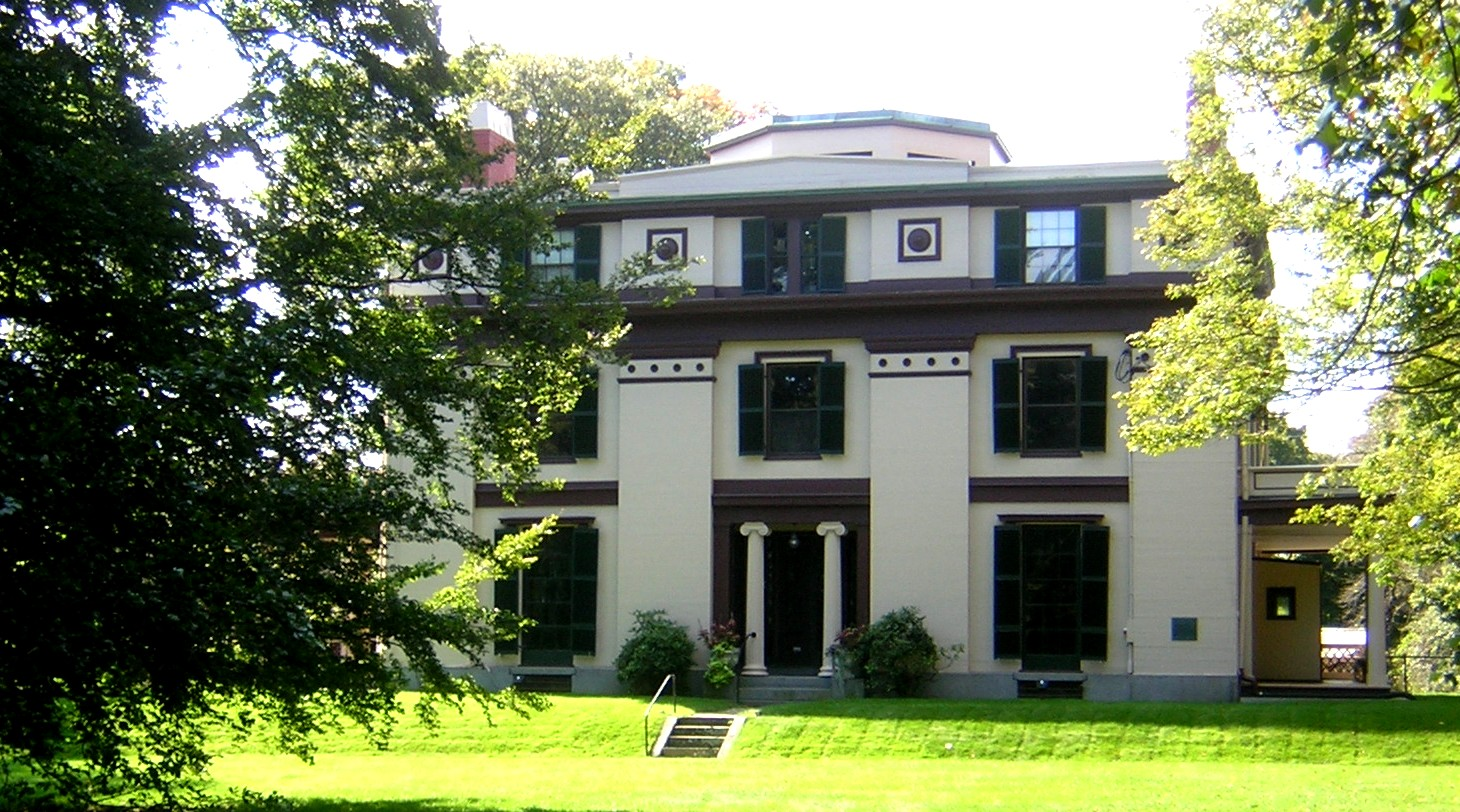
Robert B. Forbes House

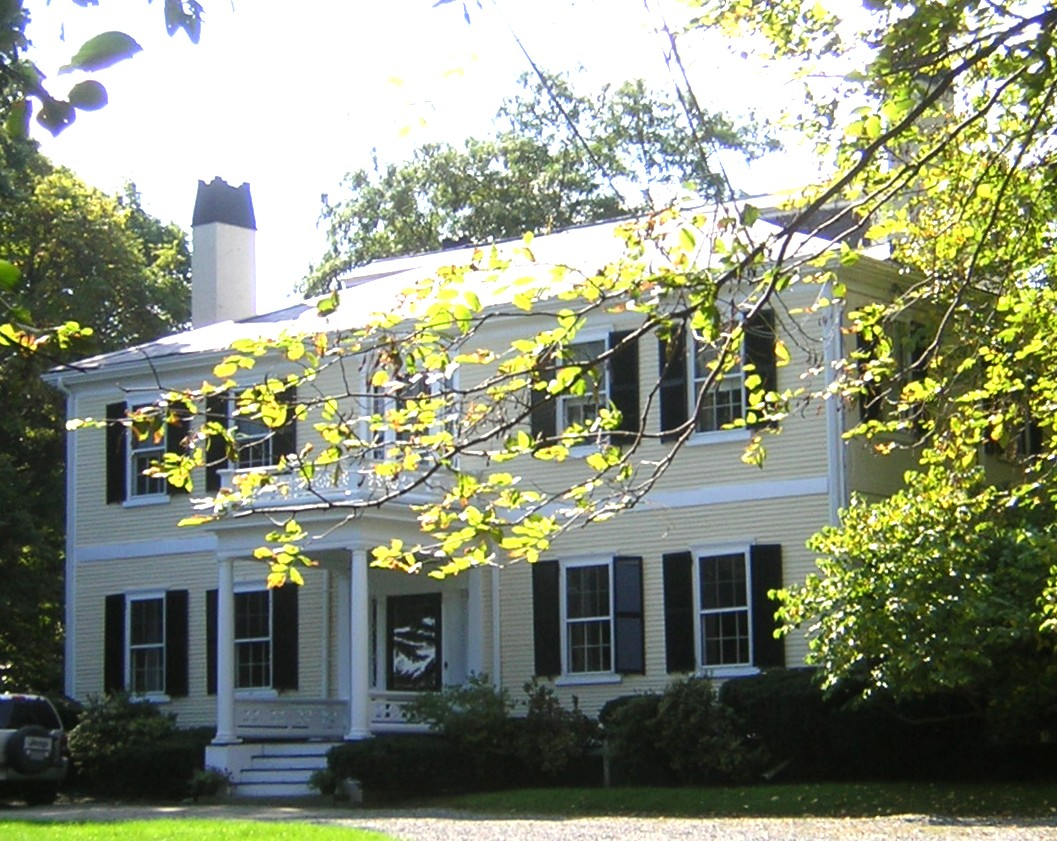
Dr. Amos Holbrook House

== See also ==
- National Register of Historic Places listings in Milton, Massachusetts
