= Thomas Hutchinson (governor) =

American colonial official (1711–1780)

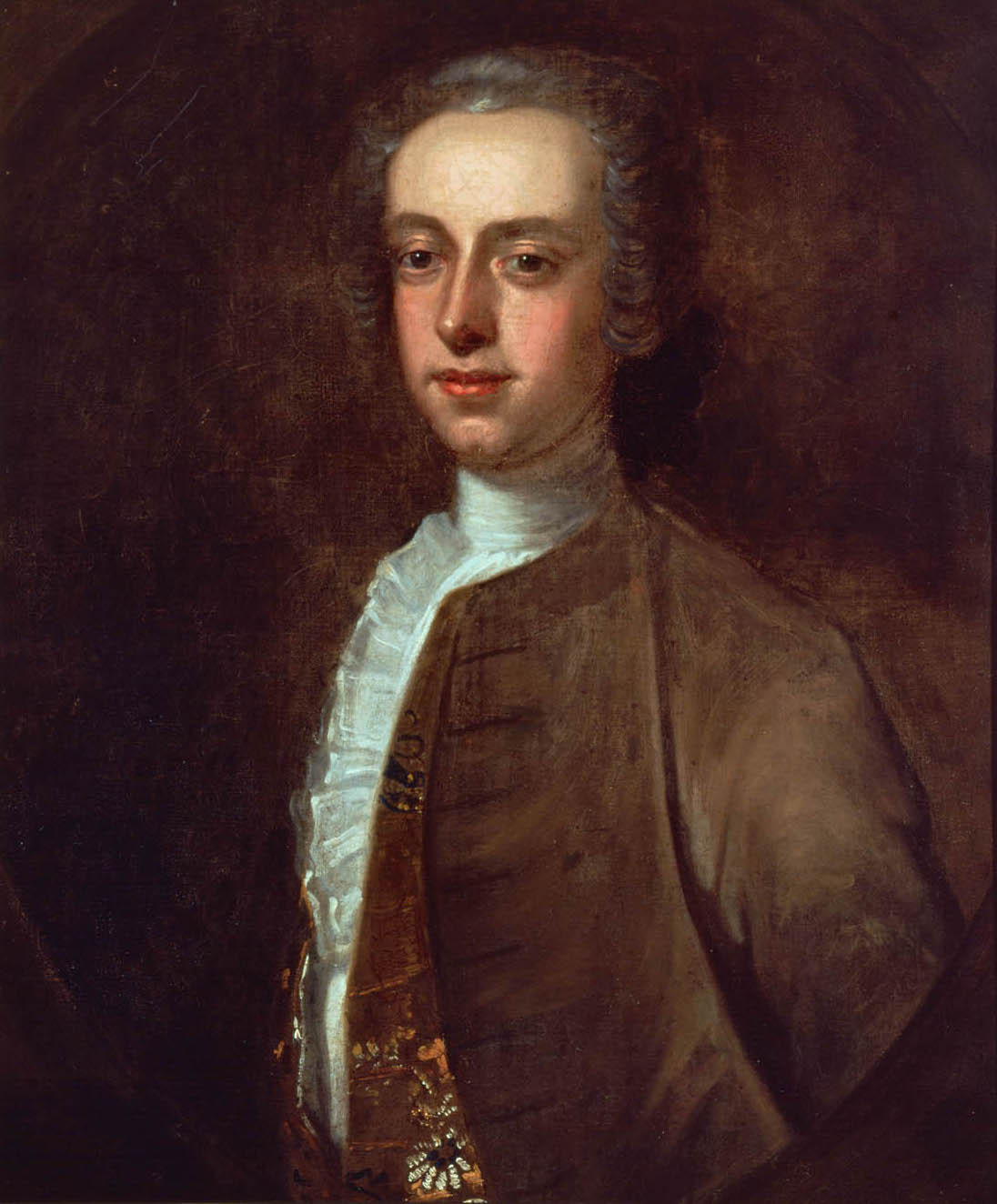
- Portrait by Edward Truman, 1741

12th Governor of the Province of Massachusetts Bay
- In office 14 March 1771 – 17 May 1774
- Lieutenant: Andrew Oliver
- Preceded by: Himself (acting)
- Succeeded by: Thomas Gage

Acting Governor of the Province of Massachusetts Bay
- In office 3 June 1760 – 2 August 1760
- Preceded by: Thomas Pownall
- Succeeded by: Francis Bernard
- In office 2 August 1769 – 14 March 1771
- Preceded by: Francis Bernard
- Succeeded by: Himself (as governor)

Lieutenant Governor of the Province of Massachusetts Bay
- In office 1758 – 14 March 1771
- Preceded by: Spencer Phips
- Succeeded by: Andrew Oliver

Personal details
- Born: 9 September 1711 Boston, Massachusetts Bay
- Died: 3 June 1780 (aged 68) Brompton, Middlesex; Great Britain
- Party: Loyalist
- Spouse: Margaret Sanford (m. 1732; died 1754)
- Children: 12 (5 survived to adulthood)
- Profession: politician, businessman

Thomas Hutchinson (9 September 1711 – 3 June 1780) was an American merchant, politician, historian, and colonial administrator who repeatedly served as governor of the Province of Massachusetts Bay in the years leading up to the American Revolution. He has been described as "the most important figure on the loyalist side in pre-Revolutionary Massachusetts". Hutchinson was a successful merchant and politician who was active at high levels of the Massachusetts colonial government for many years, serving as lieutenant governor and then governor from 1758 to 1774. He was a politically polarizing figure who came to be identified by John Adams and Samuel Adams as a supporter of unpopular British taxes, despite his initial opposition to Parliamentary tax laws directed at the colonies. Hutchinson was blamed by British Prime Minister Lord North for being a significant contributor to the tensions that led to the outbreak of the American Revolutionary War.

Hutchinson's Boston mansion was ransacked in 1765 during protests against the Stamp Act, damaging his collection of materials on the history of Massachusetts. As acting governor in 1770, he personally visited the aftermath of the Boston Massacre, an event after which he ordered the removal of British occupational troops from Boston to Castle William. Letters of his calling for the abridgment of colonial rights were published in 1773, further intensifying opposition towards him in the colony. Hutchinson was replaced as governor in May 1774 by General Thomas Gage and went into exile in England, where he advised the British government on its dealings with the colonists.

He had a deep interest in the colonial history of the United States, collecting many historical documents. Hutchinson wrote a three-volume History of the Province of Massachusetts Bay whose last volume, published posthumously, covered his own period in office. Historian Bernard Bailyn wrote of Hutchinson, "If there was one person in America whose actions might have altered the outcome [of the protests and disputes preceding the American Revolutionary War], it was he." Scholars use Hutchinson's career to represent the tragic fate of the many Loyalists marginalized by their attachment to the British imperial system at a time when the American nation-state was emerging. He exemplified the difficulties experienced by Loyalists, paralyzed by his ideology and his dual loyalties to America and Britain. Hutchinson sacrificed his love for Massachusetts for his loyalty to Great Britain, where he spent his last years in an unhappy exile.

== Early life ==
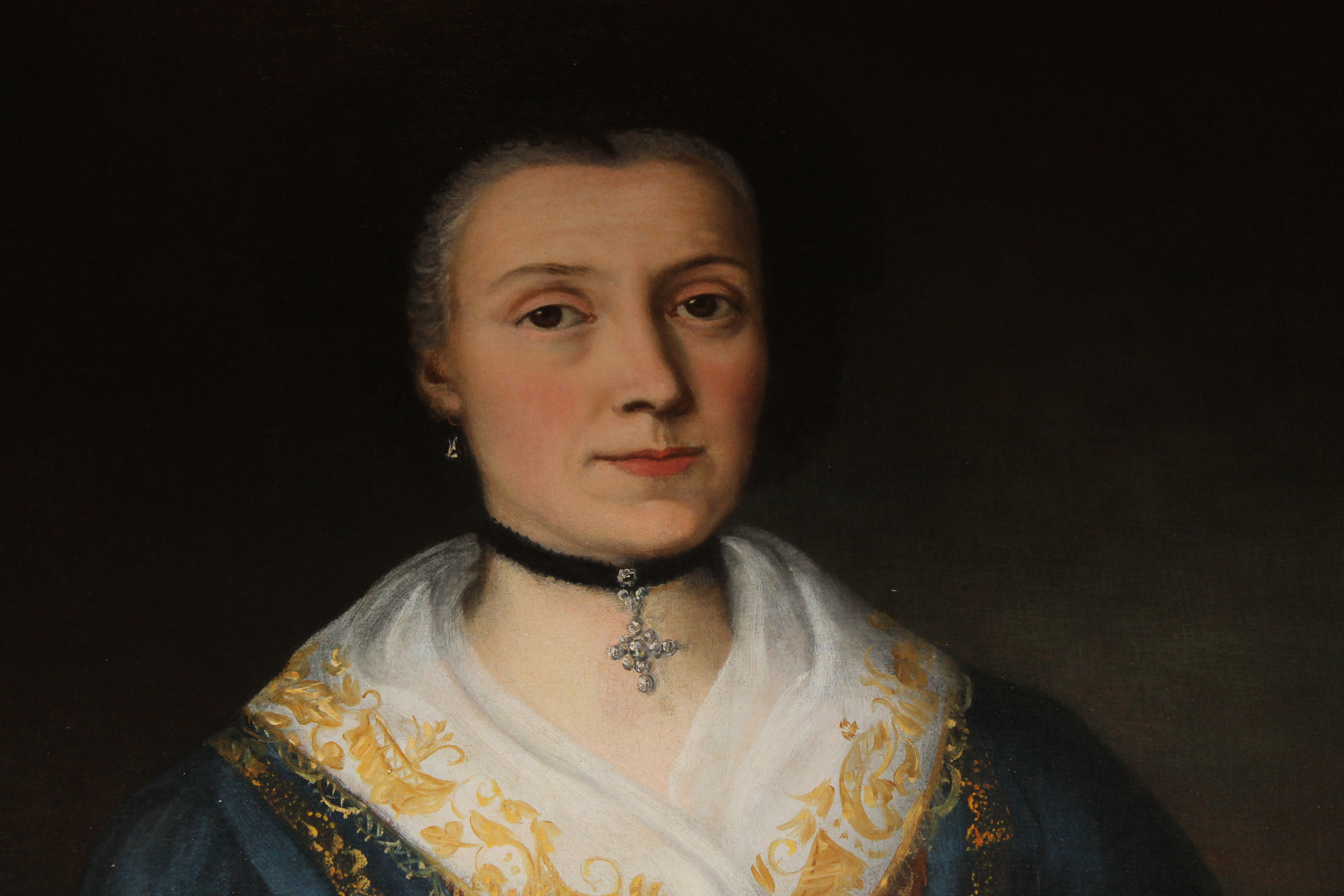
Margaret Sanford Hutchinson, wife of Thomas Hutchinson (1750)

Thomas Hutchinson was born on 9 September 1711 in the North End of Boston, the fourth of twelve children of Thomas and Sarah Foster Hutchinson. He was descended from early New England settlers, including Anne Hutchinson and her son Edward Hutchinson, and his parents were both from well-to-do merchant families. His father was involved in the family mercantile trade but was also active in political, military, and charitable circles and served on the provincial council. His younger brother was Foster Hutchinson.

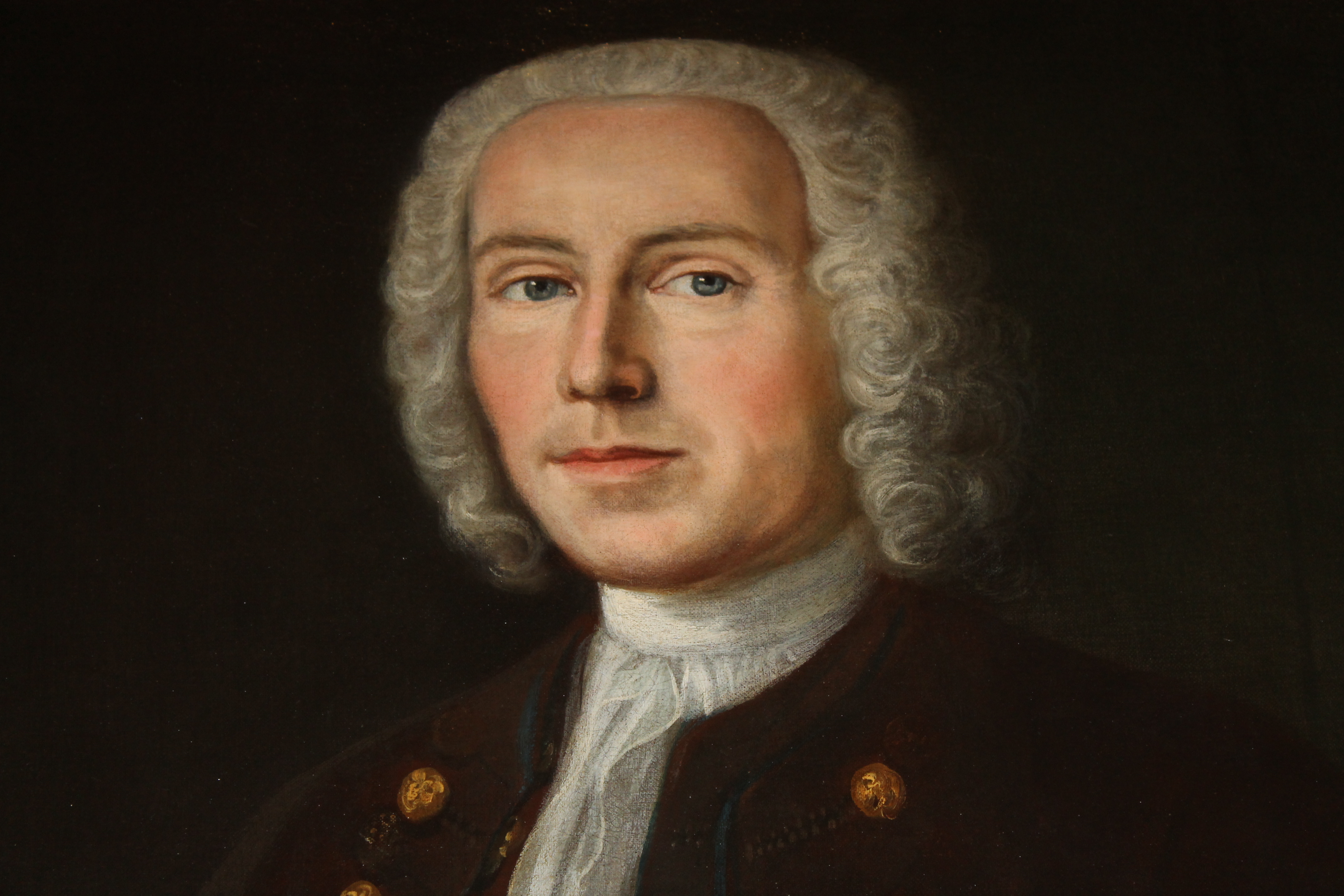
Hutchinson painting (1750)

Young Thomas entered Harvard College at twelve, graduating in 1727. His father introduced him to the business world early, and he displayed remarkable business acumen. According to the autobiographical sketch of his childhood, Hutchinson turned a modest gift from his father of "five quintals of fish" into between £400 and £500 by the time he was 21. In 1732, he received some exposure to politics when he accompanied Governor Jonathan Belcher on a voyage to Casco Bay for negotiations with the Abenaki of Maine, then part of Massachusetts. The voyage was made in a vessel of which Hutchinson was part owner.

In 1734, he married Margaret Sanford, a granddaughter of Rhode Island Governor Peleg Sanford. The Sanford and Hutchinson families had a long history of business and personal connections; Margaret, in fact, was his third cousin.

The marriage secured a political alliance between Hutchinson and Andrew and Peter Oliver which lasted long after Margaret's death. Margaret Sanford's sister Mary (1713–1773) was the second wife of Andrew Oliver. Likewise, a daughter of Thomas Hutchinson married a son of Peter Oliver. The Oliver brothers were also related to Massachusetts governor Jonathan Belcher and to New Hampshire lieutenant governors William Partridge and George Vaughan (Harvard Class of 1696). The couple had twelve children, only five of whom survived to adulthood before Margaret died in 1754 from complications of childbirth.

== Legislator and councillor ==
In 1737 Hutchinson entered politics, being elected as a Boston selectman, and later in the year, to a seat in the General Court (the provincial assembly).

He spoke out against the province's practice of issuing bills of credit (as a form of paper currency), whose inflationary drop in value wrought havoc in the economy. This position was unpopular with the populist party in the province, and Hutchinson was voted out in the 1739 election.

He was sent to England as an agent to plead on behalf of property owners affected by King George II's decision concerning the boundary line between Massachusetts and New Hampshire which significantly favored New Hampshire. Hutchinson's embassy was unsuccessful, although he returned with a bequest to Harvard for the construction of a new chapel; Holden Chapel, built with these funds, still stands today.

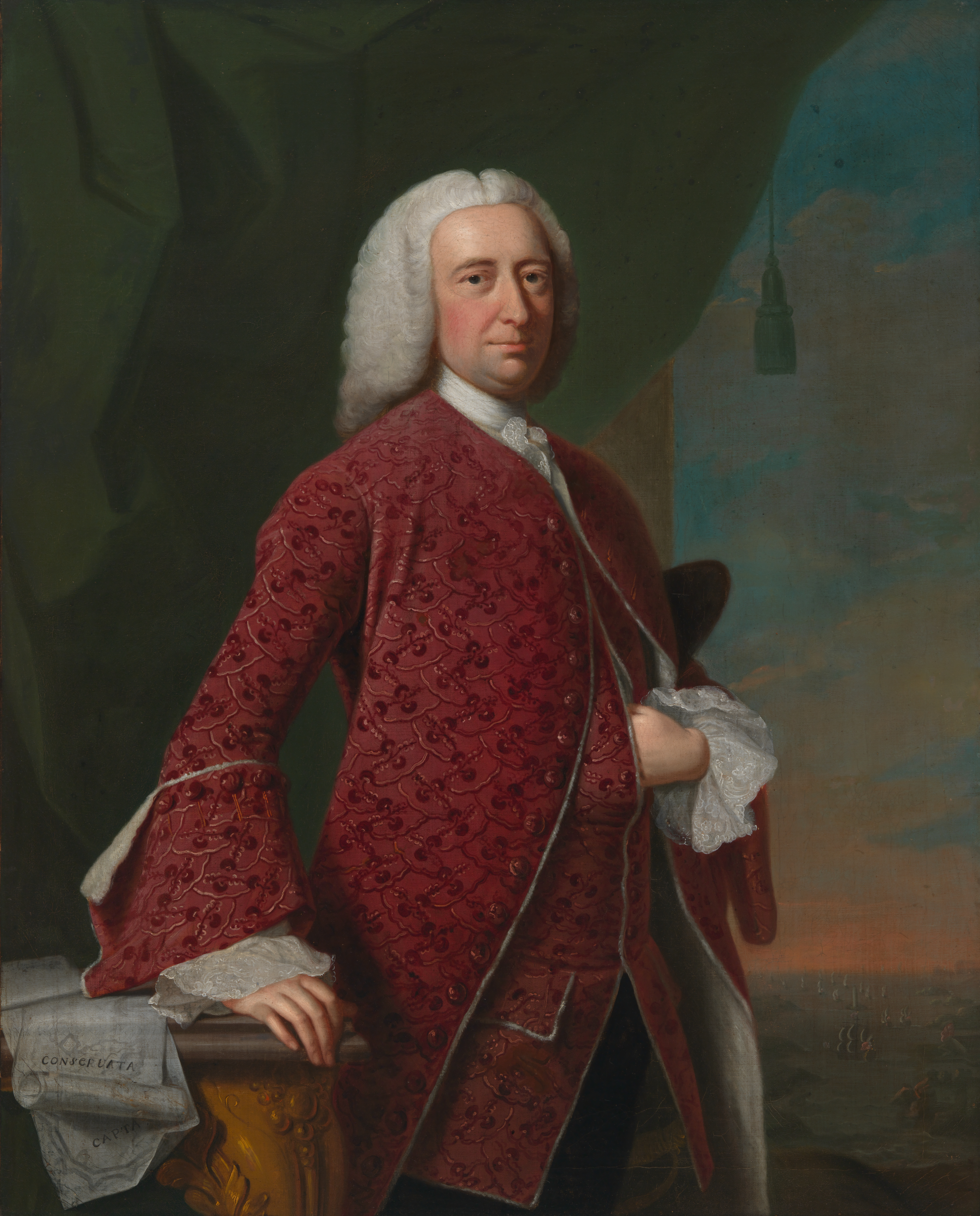
Portrait of William Shirley by Thomas Hudson, 1750

In 1742, Hutchinson was again elected to the General Court, where he served until 1749, being the body's speaker from 1746 to 1749.

His continued advocacy of currency reforms so annoyed the populist faction that the need to guard his properties in Boston and Milton from possible mob action was discussed.

When the British government was convinced to refund the province's expense for mounting the 1745 Louisbourg expedition, Hutchinson seized upon the idea of using the massive payment (about £180,000 in gold and silver) to retire the province's paper currency. Despite significant opposition, Hutchinson successfully navigated a bill implementing the idea through the assembly's general court in 1749; it received the agreement of the Governor's Council, and also the signature of Governor William Shirley. Many of the bill's opponents were pleasantly surprised when the exchange of paper for specie did not cause any financial shocks, and Hutchinson's popularity soared.

Despite the success, Hutchinson was voted out of the assembly in 1749. He was, however, immediately appointed to the Governor's Council.

In 1749 he headed a commission to arrange a treaty with the Indians in the District of Maine, which was then part of Massachusetts, and he served on boundary commissions to settle disputes with Connecticut and Rhode Island. In 1752 he was appointed judge of probate and a justice of the Common Pleas. Following the outbreak of the French and Indian War in 1754, he was a delegate to the Albany Convention. In that meeting he took a leading part in the discussions, working with Benjamin Franklin to draft a plan for colonial union. Hutchinson agreed with Franklin that the present disunity endangered the British colonies and that decisive action must be taken to knit the too-often-competing colonies into a coherent whole. Most important, the report drafted by Hutchinson concluded that the colonies must be encouraged to establish "a Union of His Majesty's several governments on the continent, that so their councils, treasure, and strength may be employed in due proportion against their common enemy".

Hutchinson's wife died quite suddenly in 1754; Hutchinson thereafter threw himself into his work. His work was not entirely of a political nature: in a humanitarian streak he supported Acadian refugees who had been expelled from their Nova Scotia homelands, even though this support of Roman Catholics did not gain him friends in Protestant Massachusetts. He was also sensitive to the needs of the military men involved in the war, often giving aid to needy families of veterans.

== Lieutenant governor of Massachusetts ==
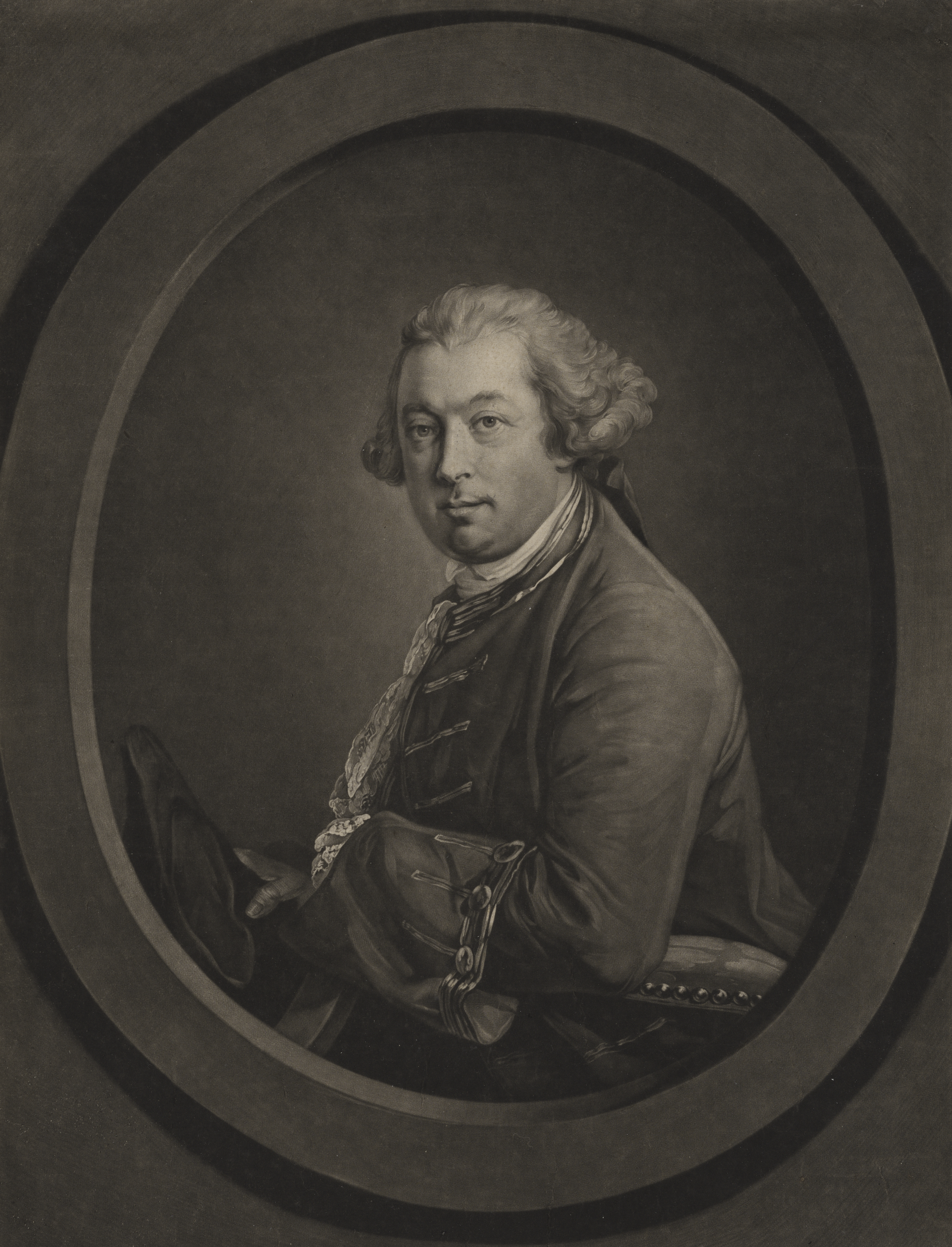
Governor Thomas Pownall

When Governor Shirley's political opponents engineered his recall in 1756, Hutchinson sought and received the endorsement of the British military leader Lord Loudoun to succeed Shirley as governor. During this time Hutchinson was the leading politician in the province due to the age and infirmity of Lieutenant Governor Spencer Phips. Hutchinson's application was unsuccessful, but he did receive an appointment as lieutenant governor in 1758, serving under Thomas Pownall. Hutchinson's relationship with Pownall was awkward, for Pownall was at the center of political activities that dislodged Governor Shirley, under whose patronage Hutchinson had risen in power and influence. Pownall cultivated relations with the populist factions in the state and sought to remove the influence of Shirley supporters, sometimes asking Hutchinson to turn against people he (Hutchinson) had earlier supported. This Hutchinson refused to do since he saw these actions as harming the province's stability and taking place at "the caprice of the governor".

Pownall, whose mistrust of Hutchinson was reciprocated, requested to leave to return to England in late 1759. The political opposition of Shirley supporters and the death of some of his leading populist supporters may have contributed to this decision. He departed the province on 3 June 1760, leaving Hutchinson as acting governor. Several months later Pownall's replacement, Francis Bernard, arrived to take the reins of power.

=== Writs of assistance ===
One of Bernard's early acts as governor was the appointment of Hutchinson instead of James Otis Sr., as Chief Justice of the Massachusetts Superior Court of Judicature. This action by itself turned the province's populists, whose vocal leaders included Otis and his son James Jr., against both Hutchinson and Bernard, with long term consequences to Hutchinson's reputation. Hutchinson, with no legal training, had not sought the post, and some emerging legal thinkers, notably a rising young lawyer named John Adams, were also outraged.

In 1761 Hutchinson brought upon himself a storm of protest and criticism by issuing writs of assistance, documents that authorized essentially arbitrary searches by customs officials. Although some had been issued (ironically over Hutchinson's objections) in earlier years, the writs he authorized were in some cases renewals of existing writs necessitated by the accession of King George III to the throne. Adams and the Otises seized on the issue to rail against Hutchinson's monopolization of power (since he was also a lieutenant governor and sat on the council) and lack of legal qualifications for the post of chief justice.

=== Taxes and the Stamp Act ===
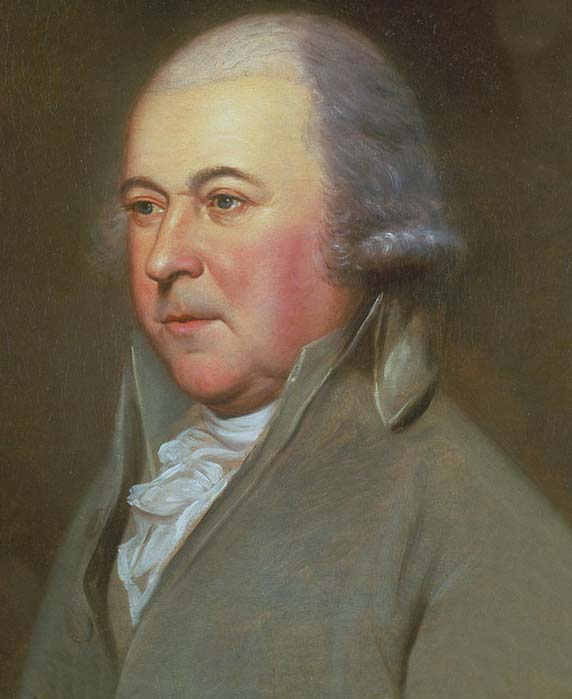
John Adams (portrait by Charles Willson Peale) was opposed to Hutchinson's ascent to the highest judicial post in the province.

When the Sugar Act was being discussed in Parliament in 1763, proposals were put forward to send Hutchinson to England to represent the colony's opposition to the proposal. Governor Bernard, however, objected to sending the sitting lieutenant governor, and subsequently the bill was enacted. Much colonial protest followed, and Hutchinson agreed with vocal opponents like the Otises (who around this time began using the phrase "no taxation without representation") that the law harmed the Massachusetts economy.

In the ensuing debates, differences emerged between Hutchinson and others over Parliament's supremacy over the North American colonies and the feasibility of Parliament having formal colonial representation overseas. These differences were exacerbated by the personal animosity that had developed between Hutchinson and the Otises. Led by James Otis, Jr. and Oxenbridge Thacher, the anti-Parliament faction seized on every minor dispute to rail against Hutchinson and his faction's monopolization of power. Hutchinson was at first dismissive of these ongoing political attacks, believing that his opponents were either misguided or misled. Biographer Andrew Walmsley observes that Hutchinson at this stage seriously underestimated the impact of these attacks in building a coherent opposition to crown control, and in the damage it was doing to his own reputation.

In debates leading up to the passage of the 1765 Stamp Act, both Hutchinson and Bernard quietly warned London not to proceed. Hutchinson in particular wrote that "It cannot be good to tax the Americans ... You will lose more than you gain."

Hutchinson's letters even shaped the political discourse in Parliament. Isaac Barre, a prominent member of Parliament, drew heavily on the themes presented in Hutchinson's letters: he proclaimed that "Your oppressions planted them. . . . They grew by your neglect. . . . They have nobly taken up arms in your defense" on the floor of Parliament in opposition to the Stamp Act. When the Massachusetts assembly met to draft a petition to London on the matter in October 1764, Hutchinson opposed the inclusion of the radicals' language, and eventually pushed through a more moderate statement of opposition. However, the Massachusetts petition was seen as weak in comparison to those prepared by other colonies, and Hutchinson was claimed to be secretly seeking to promote the Stamp Act. He was also accused of "treachery" and "betraying his country".

News of the act's passage propelled one of the most vocal opponents of Parliamentary supremacy, Samuel Adams, into a larger role in provincial politics. Hutchinson privately supported calls for its repeal, but his unwillingness to publicly oppose the act merely provided additional fuel for his opponents.

=== 1765 colonist violence ===
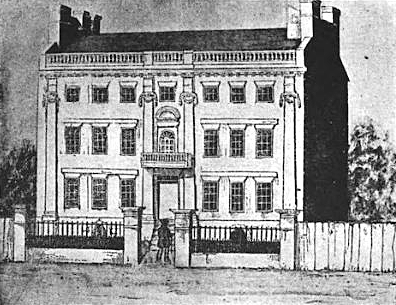
Hutchinson house, Garden Court Street, North End, Boston

Hutchinson's brother-in-law, colonial secretary Andrew Oliver, was given the job of "stamp master", with responsibility for implementing the Stamp Act in the province. Although Hutchinson apparently had no hand in this assignment, his opponents were quick to accuse him of further duplicity.

His attempts to explain his position only fueled the opposition, who recounted his early unpopular acts and questioned his motives in those deeds.

On 13 August 1765, angry colonists descended on Oliver's home and office, ransacking both. The next night Hutchinson's Boston mansion was surrounded, and the crowd demanded that he formally deny arguing in favor of the Stamp Act in his correspondence with London. He refused, and only the intervention of a moderate leader prevented any action that night.

Twelve days later, on the evening of 26 August, the colonists again formed outside of his mansion, and this time they would not be denied. Described by one architectural historian as "the first developed example of provincial Palladianism in New England," the house was broken into (Hutchinson and his family narrowly escaping) and systematically ransacked. The house finishings (wainscoting and other decorative woodwork) were effectively destroyed, and even the building's cupola was taken down in violence that lasted the entire night. The family silver, furniture, and other items were stolen or destroyed (although some items were eventually returned), and Hutchinson's collection of historically important manuscripts was scattered. Hutchinson was then working on the final volume of his three-volume history of the Massachusetts Bay colony. Many pages of the work were lost that night and had to be recreated.

Hutchinson's detailed inventory (reprinted by biographer James Kendall Hosmer) valued the damage done at more than £2,200, and he eventually received over £3,100 from the province for his troubles.

Hutchinson and his family temporarily took refuge at Castle William, and thereafter took up primary residence at Hutchinson's estate in Milton.

== Governor of Massachusetts ==
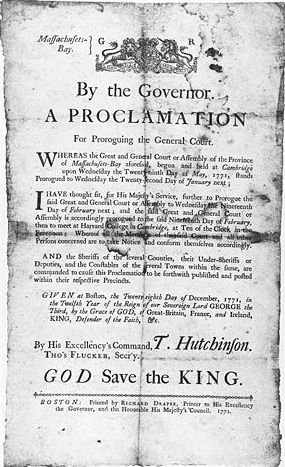
A proclamation issued by Hutchinson in 1771

Because of the controversy over the Stamp Act, the radical faction came to control both the assembly and the governor's council in 1766, and Hutchinson was denied a seat on the governor's council.

Amid increased furor after the passage of the 1767 Townshend Acts, Governor Bernard requested and received British Army troops to protect crown officials. Letters written by Bernard describing conditions in the province were acquired by the radical opposition and published, leading to his recall. Bernard left for England on 1 August 1769, leaving Hutchinson as acting governor.

Hutchinson was unsuccessful in his attempts to distance himself from the unpopular Bernard administration, and he continued to be attacked in the assembly and the local press. Despite this, he continued to lobby for a formal appointment as governor. He categorically refused to again serve as lieutenant governor under another governor, preferring instead a posting elsewhere, or to resign the lieutenant governorship.

Hutchinson was still acting governor when protests over the Townshend Acts erupted into the Boston Massacre on 5 March 1770, when nine British soldiers fired into a crowd of hundreds of Bostonians who were harassing them verbally and physically, killing five people. Hutchinson went to the scene in the aftermath of the shooting and promised that justice would be applied fairly. He had all of the soldiers involved in the incident arrested the next day, but ongoing unrest in the city compelled him to request the withdrawal of British troops from the city into Castle William.

Hutchinson was able to postpone the trial for almost six months to allow anger to settle and for Adams to prepare a solid case. The soldiers involved were eventually tried, and two were convicted of manslaughter, although their sentences were reduced. The episode shook Hutchinson's confidence in his ability to manage affairs in the province, and he penned a resignation letter.

=== Appointment to governor ===
Former Governor Bernard had, in the meantime, taken up Hutchinson's cause in London. In March 1771 Hutchinson's commission as governor arrived in Boston, having been approved by the king while Hutchinson's resignation letter was going the other way. (Colonial Secretary Lord Hillsborough rejected his resignation.) The instructions sent with the commission were fairly strict and left Hutchinson's relatively little room to maneuver politically. Instructions that particularly galled Samuel Adams included one restricting the meetings of the governor's council, and another limiting the appointment of colonial agents to individuals having the governor's approval.

=== Questions of colonial autonomy ===
One of Hutchinson's instructions was to relocate the provincial assembly from Boston to Cambridge, where it would be less under the influence of radical Boston politics. This demand, accomplished by executive order, resulted in howls of complaint of gubernatorial arbitrariness in the assembly. An exchange of arguments, rebuttals, and counterarguments between Hutchinson and the assembly ran for thousands of pages and lasted until 1772.

The objections to the relocation furthered the radical cause. Radical objectors painted Hutchinson's action as a bold and devious attempt to further the executive prerogative. The radicals were further outraged when Hutchinson announced in 1772 that his salary, which had previously been subject to appropriation by the assembly, would be paid by the crown instead. This was seen by the radicals as a further usurpation of power that rightfully belonged in the province. Written debates further questioned the role of Parliament in governing the policies of the North American colonies, and further deepened the divide between the Massachusetts assembly and Hutchinson. Observers in the other colonies and in England noted that Hutchinson's arguments had effectively driven moderates in the province to join with the political hardliners.

=== Letters affair ===
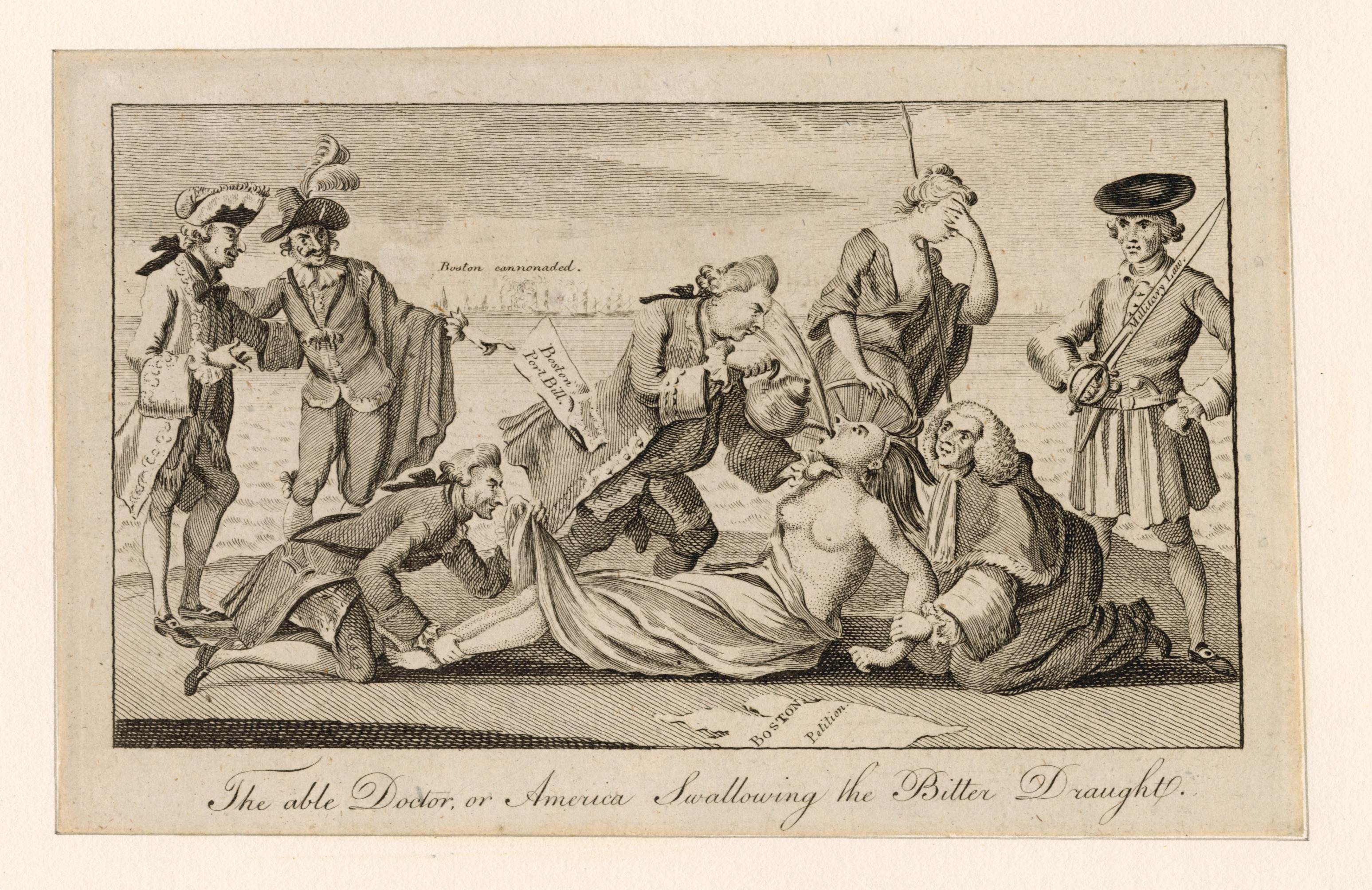
Engraving by Paul Revere depicting British reaction to the Boston Tea Party

The Massachusetts debate reached a pitch in 1772 when Hutchinson, in a speech to the assembly, argued that either the colony was wholly subject to Parliament, or that it was effectively independent. The assembly's response, authored by John Adams, Samuel Adams, and Joseph Hawley, countered that the colonial charter granted autonomy.

In England, the colonial secretary Lord Dartmouth insisted to colonial agent Benjamin Franklin that the Massachusetts assembly retract its response. Franklin had acquired a packet of letters, written in the late 1760s by Hutchinson and other colonial officials, from which he concluded that Hutchinson and Oliver had mischaracterized the situation in the colonies, and thus misled Parliament. Believing that wider knowledge of these letters would focus colonial anger away from Parliament and at those who had written the misleading letters, Franklin sent the letters to Thomas Cushing, the speaker of the Massachusetts assembly, in December 1772.

He insisted to Cushing that they not be published or widely circulated, because he was not "at liberty to make the letters public".

The letters came into the hands of Samuel Adams, then serving as the clerk of the assembly, who engineered their publication in June 1773.

Franklin's belief was only partially vindicated: the publication of the letters unleashed a torrent of vitriol against Hutchinson, but did nothing to lessen opposition to Parliamentary policy: instead the opposition saw the letters as confirmation of a conspiracy against their rights.

The letters were reprinted throughout the colonies, and Hutchinson was burned in effigy in places as far away as Philadelphia during the uproar.

Hutchinson's letters, written between 1767 and 1769 to Thomas Whately, a retired former leading member of the British government, included the observation that colonists couldn't have the full rights they would have in the home country, essentially requiring an "abridgment of what are called English liberties".

He made no specific proposals on how the colonial government should be reformed, writing in a letter that was not among those published, "I can think of nothing but what will produce as great an evil as that which it may remove or will be of a very uncertain event." Letters by Andrew Oliver, in contrast, specifically proposed that the governor's council, whose members were then elected by the assembly with the governor's consent, be changed to one whose members were appointed by the crown.

Although much of what Hutchinson wrote in the letters was not particularly new, Samuel Adams masterfully manipulated the contents and implications of some of the statements by Hutchinson and Oliver to suggest they were conspiring with officials in London to deprive the colonists of their rights.

Hutchinson was defended in print by provincial attorney general Jonathan Sewall, who claimed that Hutchinson was not actually expressing desired changes in the state of affairs but ruminating instead on possible consequences of present conditions.

The Massachusetts assembly drafted a petition to the Board of Trade demanding Hutchinson's removal from office, and Hutchinson, concerned with the effect the letter publication and the assembly petition would have in London, requested permission to come to England to defend himself. The letter authorizing his return did not reach Boston until November 1773, too late for him to depart that year; his request and the assembly's petition would not be heard until early 1774.

=== Tea Party ===
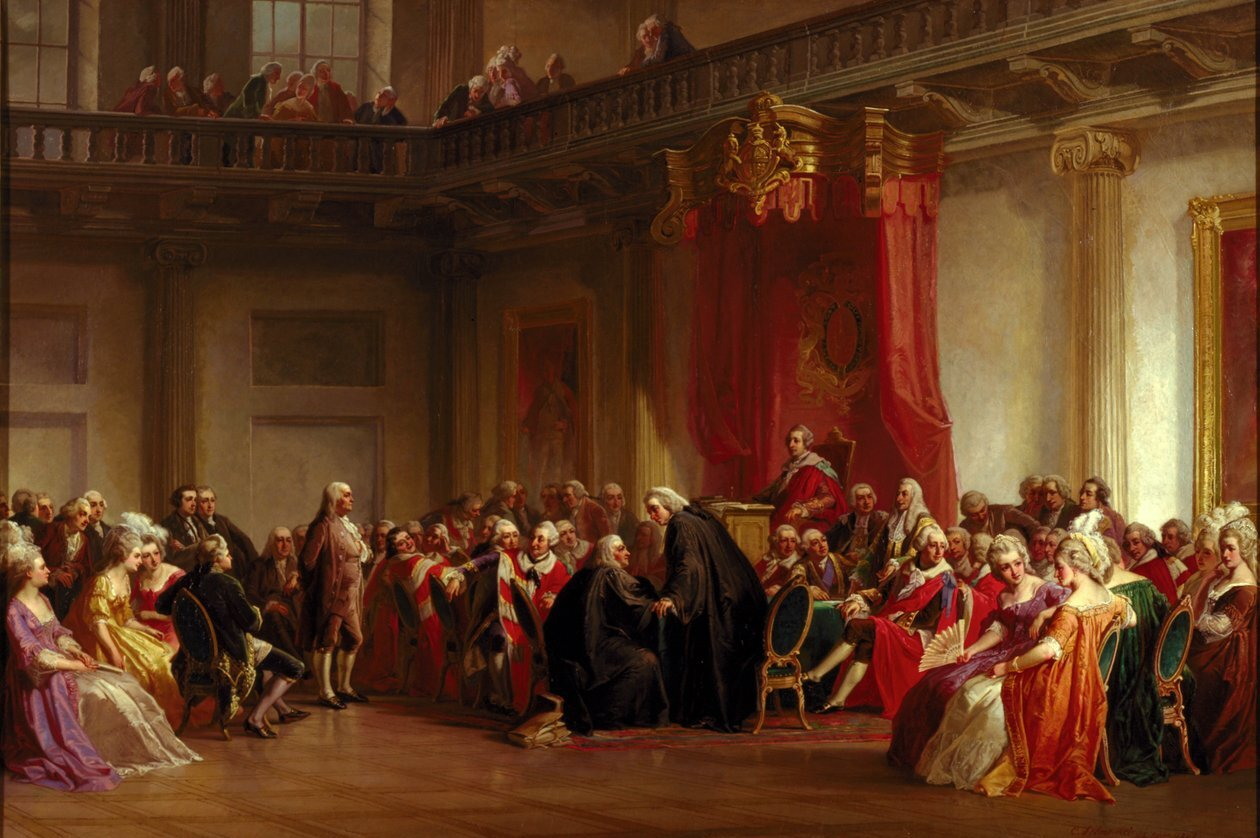
Benjamin Franklin at the Privy Council hearing in 1774

In the meantime, Parliament had repealed most of the Townshend taxes (keeping only the one on tea), and passed the Tea Act, which authorized the British East India Company to ship tea directly to the colonies, eliminating colonial merchants from its supply chain and undercutting the price of smuggled Dutch tea. This caused colonial merchants all over the North American colonies to organize opposition to the deliveries of the company's tea. In Massachusetts the arrival of ships carrying tea in November 1773 brought about a crisis since duties were to be paid on dutiable cargo within twenty days of a ship's arrival. Hutchinson and his sons were among the businessmen to whom the company had consigned its tea, although Hutchinson disclaimed any official role in the choice of the consignee. Other cargo was unloaded from the ships, but armed protestors patrolled the docks to ensure the tea was not landed. Hutchinson took a hard line, refusing to allow the tea ships to leave the harbor despite citywide protests that the tea is sent back to England, and insisting that the duty be paid and the tea landed. When the twenty-day deadline arrived on 16 December, protestors (some in Indian disguise) boarded the ships that night, and dumped the tea into the harbor.

Hutchinson justified the hardline stance that contributed to the crisis by claiming it was his duty as governor to uphold the revenue laws, while American opponents such as James Bowdoin observed that he could have just as easily refused to accept the tea when it was clear that popular sentiment would make it impossible to land the tea. British critics complained that he should have asked the British troops in Boston to intervene. After it became known that other tea ships sent to North America had turned back, Hutchinson continued to justify his actions in letters to England, anticipating hearings on the matter once he arrived there.

When the Board of Trade met to consider the assembly's petition to recall Hutchinson, it also discussed the tea party. Franklin, as colonial agent, was forced to listen to a barrage of criticism and was dismissed as colonial postmaster general. The assembly's petition was dismissed as "groundless" and "vexatious", but Hutchinson's request for leave was granted. In May 1774 General Thomas Gage arrived in Boston to take over as governor, and to implement the "Coercive Acts" Parliament had passed as punishment for the Tea Party. Hutchinson, believing he would only be away from Massachusetts temporarily, sailed for England on 1 June 1774.

== Exile ==
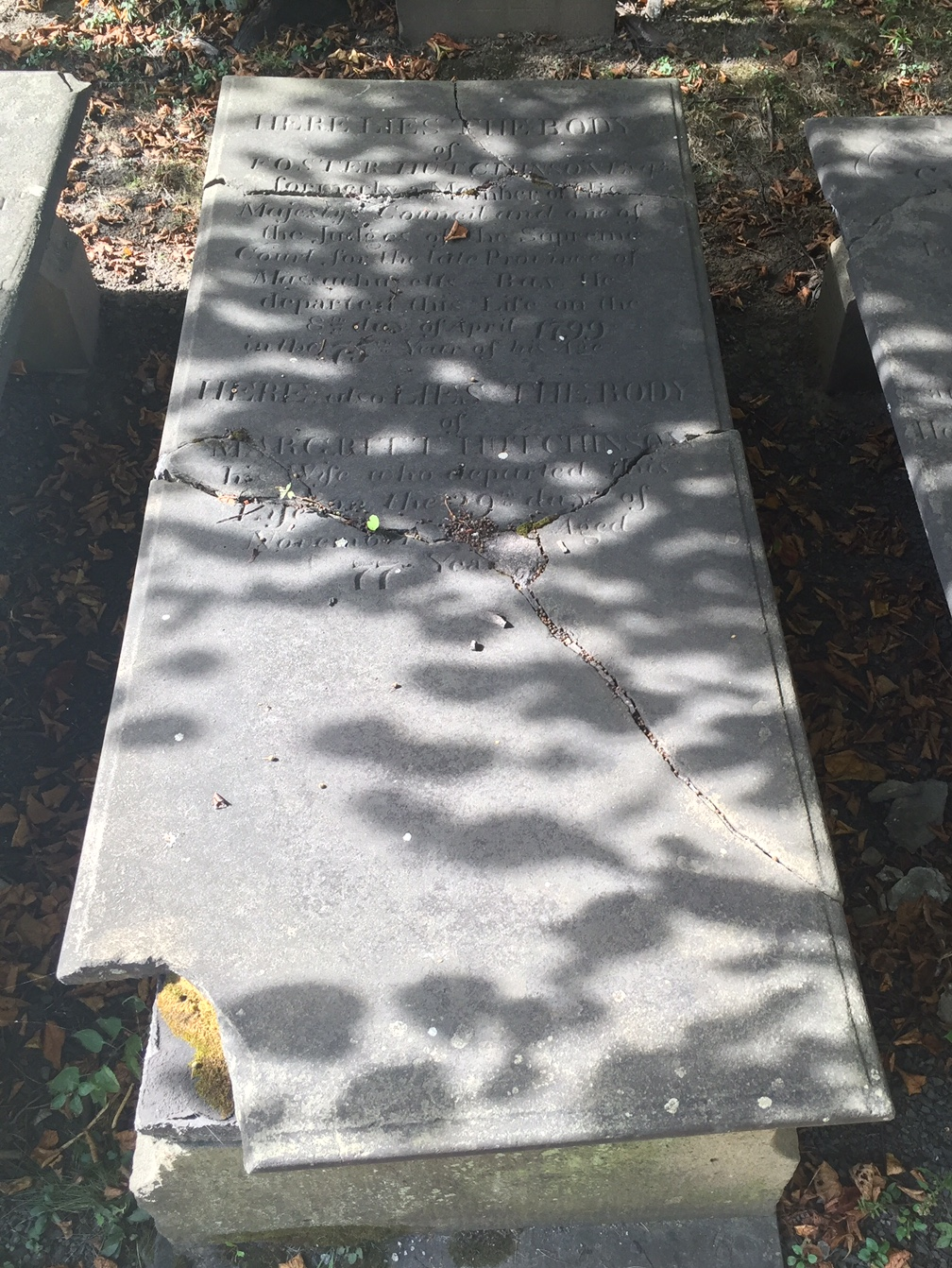
Thomas Hutchinson's brother was judge Foster Hutchinson, d. 1799, a Loyalist who escaped to Halifax. Old Burying Ground (Halifax, Nova Scotia).

Upon his arrival in London, Hutchinson was granted an audience with the king, who questioned him on affairs in North America, and he was well received by Rockingham, Dartmouth, and Lord North, the prime minister. In his interview with North he expressed dismay at the terms of the Massachusetts Government Act and sought to establish a basis for the eventual repeal of the Boston Port Act, whose enactment by Governor Gage had a crippling effect on the province's economy. One part of the Government Act, the appointment by the crown of the governor's council, was something he had long opposed without formal hearings on the matter, but even colonial authorities sympathetic to his view believed events had by 1774 gone too far for the British political establishment to support alternatives. At the outbreak of the American Revolutionary War in April 1775, his Milton mansion was seized for use as an army barracks, and a trunk containing copies of much of his correspondence fell into rebel hands.

After publication of the Declaration of Independence in America in July 1776, Huchinson published anonymously in London the following November a point-by-point rebuttal called Strictures Upon the Declaration, defending King George III. Hutchinson's argument was that the Declaration was a series of "wilful misrepresentations," "imaginary grievances," and "brutal insults" as incitements to rebellion; further, that "if no taxes or duties had been laid upon the colonies, other pretences would have been found for exception to the authority of Parliament."

As the war progressed, Hutchinson was criticized by the Whigs in Parliament. He continued to be treated favorably by the king, but was compelled to refuse the offer of a baronetcy because most of his fortune was lost due to his exile, and he became marginalized from power as the prosecution of the war took center stage. On 4 July 1776, Hutchinson was awarded an honorary doctorate of law by Oxford University.

His enemies in Massachusetts continued to attack his reputation, and his exile made it impossible to effectively dispute the charges they made. His properties, like those of other exiled Loyalists, were seized and sold off by the state; his Milton home was eventually purchased by James and Mercy Otis Warren (the latter being the sister of his long-time enemy James Otis, Jr.)

Bitter and disillusioned about his forced exile, and grieving the loss of his daughter Peggy in 1777, Hutchinson continued to work on his history of the colony which was the fruit of many decades of research. Two volumes were published in his lifetime: Volume 1 of the History of Massachusetts appeared in 1764, and Volume 2 in 1767. The third volume would be published posthumously, and included his own tenure as lieutenant governor and governor. At the same time, he worked to complete a history of the Hutchinson family, in which he encapsulated details on political affairs not found elsewhere. He suffered a stroke and died at Brompton in west London on 3 June 1780, aged 68, and was buried in Croydon Minster in south London.

== Legacy and memory ==
During and after the Revolution as an unrepentant Loyalist Hutchinson was often considered a traitor to his native Massachusetts and the cause of freedom. John Adams was characteristically harsh in his assessment of him, calling him "avaricious" and describing him as a "courtier" who manipulated those at higher levels of power to achieve his aims. He was also criticized by British political figures: Thomas Pownall continued to disagree with Hutchinson after the latter's exile, Francis Bernard (despite working on Hutchinson's behalf) disapproved of some of his actions, and Lord North believed the publication of his letters to be responsible for the outbreak of the war.

Biographers in the 20th century have, however, rehabilitated his reputation, seeking to explain how and why he came to be demonized in this way. In recent decades historians have typically portrayed Hutchinson as a tragic figure torn between his rulers in London and his people in Massachusetts. Barbara Tuchman, for example, portrays Hutchinson as an "ill-fated" and "tragic figure". British scholar David Kenneth Fieldhouse says his tragedy emerged because he was "a victim of the clash of two ideologies, his own archaic and static, that of his opponents contemporary and dynamic". Carl L. Becker, a prominent American historian wrote: "Nothing would have pleased him [Hutchinson] more than that New England should have shown its emancipation from provincialism by meriting the goodwill of the king. His irritation with America in general and Boston, in particular, was the irritation of a proud and possessive father with a beloved but wayward child who fails to do him credit in high places." Bailyn has changed his own interpretation over the years. In the 1970s he saw Hutchinson as a bewildered pragmatist. By 2004 he portrayed Hutchinson as a premodern thinker locked in an old mindset at a time when Enlightenment ideas were taking hold thanks to thinkers such as Adam Smith and Thomas Paine.

Remnants of Hutchinson's country estate in Milton have been preserved. The main piece, a parcel of land known as Governor Hutchinson's Field, is owned by The Trustees of the Reservations and is listed on the National Register of Historic Places. It is open to the public, and nearby property features a ha-ha constructed for Hutchinson in 1771. The ha-ha is listed on the National Register of Historic Places, and both properties are part of the Milton Hill Historic District. Boston, which had landmarks named after the Hutchinson family, took pains upon his departure to rename them.

== In popular culture ==
In the 2015 miniseries Sons of Liberty, Hutchinson is portrayed by Sean Gilder.

== Publications ==
- Hutchinson, Thomas (1764). The History of the Colony of Massachusett's Bay: From the First Settlement Thereof in 1628, until its Incorporation with the Colony of Plimoth Province, Province of Main, etc., by the Charter of King William and Queen Mary in 1691. Boston: Thomas and John Fleet. the First volume of Hutchinson's History
- Hutchinson, Thomas (1767). The History of the Province of Massachusetts-Bay: From the Charter of King William and Queen Mary in 1691, Until the Year 1750. Boston: Thomas and John Fleet. Second volume of Hutchinson's History
- Hutchinson, Thomas (1776). Strictures Upon the Declaration. London: self-published. Commentary on the United States Declaration of Independence
- Hutchinson, Thomas (1828). Hutchinson, John (ed.). The History of the Province of Massachusetts Bay: From 1749 to 1774, Comprising a Detailed Narrative of the Origin and Early Stages of the American Revolution. London: John Murray. Third volume of Hutchinson's History, published posthumously
- Hutchinson, Thomas (1769). A Collection of Original Papers Relative to the History of the Colony of Massachusets-Bay. Boston, New-England: Thomas and John Fleet.
- Hutchinson, Thomas (1865). The Hutchinson Papers, Vol. I. Albany, NY: The Prince Society. A collection of historical papers "intended to support and elucidate the principal facts related in the first part of [Hutchinson's] 'History', and may serve as an Appendix to it."
- Hutchinson, Thomas (1865). The Hutchinson Papers, Vol. II. Albany, NY: The Prince Society.

== Bibliography ==
- Alexander, John (2011). Samuel Adams: The Life of an American Revolutionary. Lanham, MD: Rowman and Littlefield. ISBN 978-0-7425-7033-7. OCLC 678924183.
- Bailyn, Bernard (1974). The Ordeal of Thomas Hutchinson. Cambridge, MA: Harvard University Press. ISBN 978-0-674-64160-0. OCLC 6825524.
- Brands, H. W (2010) [2002]. The First American: The Life and Times of Benjamin Franklin. New York: Anchor Books. ISBN 978-0-30775-4943. OCLC 681395039.
- Duffy, Shannon E. (2008). An Enlightened American: The Political Ideology of Thomas Hutchinson on the Eve of the Revolutionary Crisis. College Park, MD. ISBN 978-0-549-96675-3.
- Ferling, John (1992). John Adams: A Life. Knoxville, TN: University of Tennessee Press. ISBN 0-870-49730-8.
- Galvin, John (1976). Three Men of Boston. New York: Thomas Y. Crowell. ISBN 978-0-69001-0183. OCLC 1530708.
- Hosmer, John Kendall (1896). The Life of Thomas Hutchinson. Boston: Houghton, Mifflin. OCLC 1527164.
- Isaacson, Walter (2004). Benjamin Franklin: An American Life. New York: Simon & Schuster. ISBN 9780743258074.
- Knollenberg, Bernhard (1975). Growth of the American Revolution, 1766–1775. New York: Free Press. ISBN 0-02-917110-5.
- Labaree, Benjamin (1979). The Boston Tea Party. Boston: Northeastern University Press. ISBN 9780930350055. OCLC 233932009.
- Morgan, Edmund (December 1948). "Thomas Hutchinson and the Stamp Act". New England Quarterly. 21 (4): 459–492. doi:10.2307/361566. JSTOR 361566.
- Morgan, Edmund (2003) [2002]. Benjamin Franklin. New Haven, CT: Yale University Press. ISBN 9780300101621. OCLC 224091444.
- Penegar, Kenneth (2011). The Political Trial of Benjamin Franklin. New York: Algora Publishing. ISBN 978-0-87586-8493. OCLC 696296728.
- Roberts, Andrew (2021). The Last King of America. London: Viking Press. ISBN 9781984879264.
- Walmsley, Andrew (1999). Thomas Hutchinson and the Origins of the American Revolution. New York: New York University Press. ISBN 978-0-81479-3411. OCLC 246413134.
- Waters, John; Schutz, John (October 1967). "Patterns of Massachusetts Colonial Politics: The Writs of Assistance and the Rivalry between the Otis and Hutchinson Families". The William and Mary Quarterly. 24 (Third Series, Volume 24, No. 4): 543–567. doi:10.2307/1919470. JSTOR 1919470.
- Wright, Esmond (1988). Franklin of Philadelphia. Cambridge, MA: Harvard University Press. ISBN 978-0-674-31809-0. OCLC 12751540.
- Wroth, Kevin; Zobel, Hiller B., eds. (1965). Legal Papers of John Adams. New York: Atheneum.
- "Memoir of Thomas Hutchinson". New England Historical and Genealogical Register. 1 (4). Boston. October 1847. OCLC 190834819.

Political offices
Preceded by Thomas Pownall	Governor of the Province of Massachusetts Bay (acting); 3 June 1760 – 2 August 1760	Succeeded by Francis Bernard
Preceded by Francis Bernard	Governor of the Province of Massachusetts Bay (acting); 2 August 1769 – 14 March 1771	Succeeded by himself as governor
Preceded by himself as acting governor	Governor of the Province of Massachusetts Bay; 14 March 1771 – 17 May 1774	Succeeded by Thomas Gage
Legal offices
Preceded by Stephen Sewall	Chief Justice of the Massachusetts Superior Court of Judicature; 1761–1769	Succeeded by Benjamin Lynde, Jr.
