= Milton Centre Historic District =

Historic district in Massachusetts, United States

- U.S. National Register of Historic Places
- U.S. Historic district
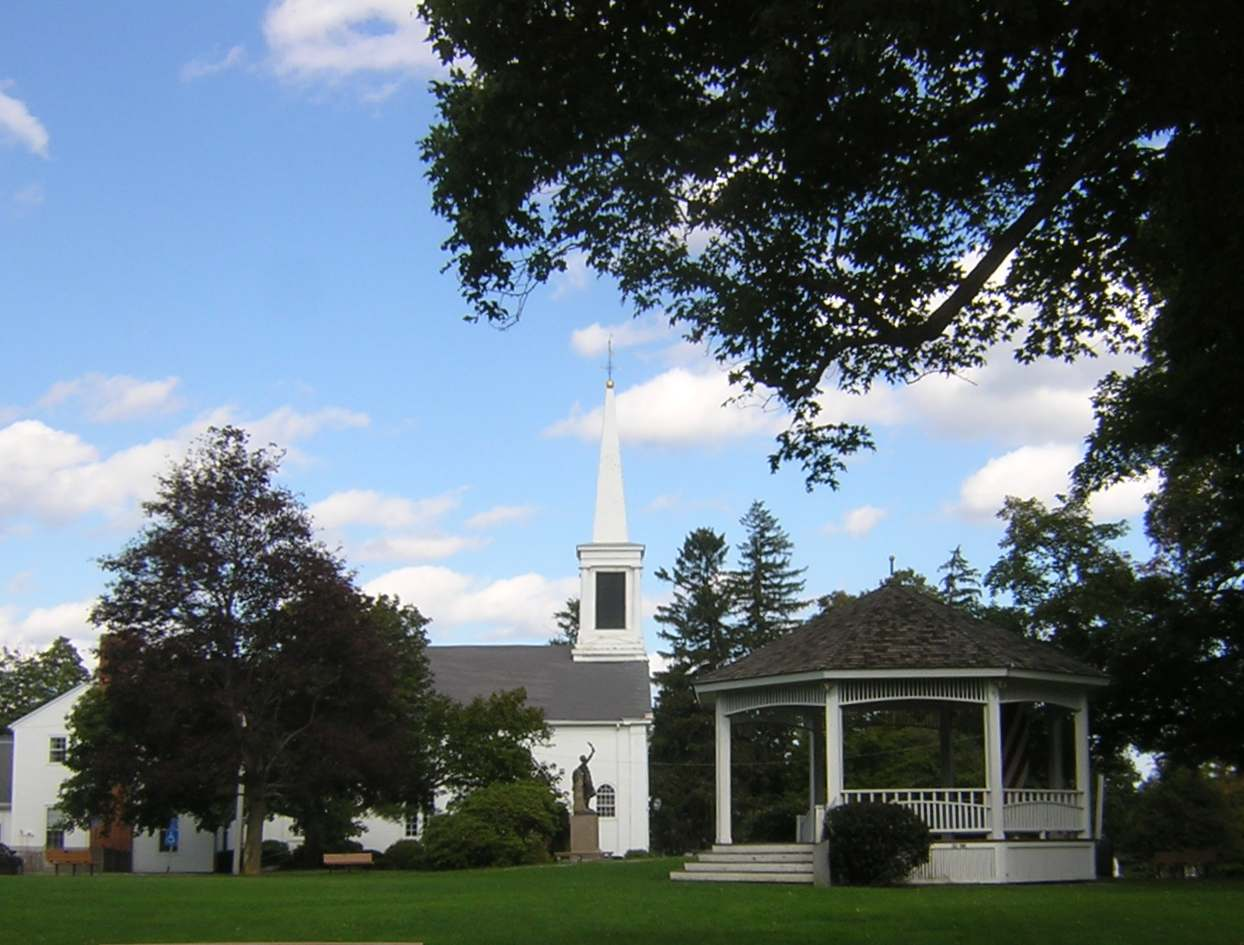

- Location within Massachusetts Location within the United States
- Location: Canton Ave. between Readsdale Rd. and Thacher and Highland Sts., Milton, Massachusetts
- Coordinates: 42°15′12″N 71°4′47″W
- Area: 23 acres (9.3 ha)
- Built: 1907
- Architect: Shepley, Rutan & Coolidge; Et al.
- Architectural style: Late 19th And 20th Century Revivals, Late Victorian, Federal
- NRHP reference No.: 88000428
- Added to NRHP: April 28, 1988

The Milton Centre Historic District encompasses the traditional civic heart of Milton, Massachusetts. The district is located on Canton Avenue between Readsdale Road and Thacher and Highland Streets, and includes municipal buildings, churches, and residences, most built in the 18th or 19th century. The district was listed on the National Register of Historic Places in 1988.

== Description and history ==
Milton Centre is located on a prominence known local as Academy Hill. The town was settled in 1633 as part of Dorchester, and was separately incorporated in 1662. Its first meetinghouse was built on Milton Hill, but Academy Hill was selected in 1727 (after many years of controversy) as the site of the town's third meetinghouse. The fourth meetinghouse, built in 1788, is now the First Parish Church, and is the oldest surviving building in the center. The town's economic activity was focused along the Neponset River, and the town center remained relatively rural until the 19th century, when Milton Academy was founded and located on land to its east. This was joined by the First Congregational Church in 1834, and a new town hall in 1837. The site of that town hall is where the present town hall (built 1970) is located.

The historic district consists of eleven historically significant buildings, set on about 23 acres (9.3 ha) of land bisected by Canton Avenue, between Readsdale Road and Thacher and Highland Streets. The district's civic buildings also include the town library, and two of its oldest surviving fire station buildings, including a rare example of an early chemical fire engine house. It also includes an 1811 powder house, which stored munitions during the War of 1812, and monuments commemorating the town's contributors to national efforts in the American Civil War and World War I.

== See also ==
- National Register of Historic Places listings in Milton, Massachusetts
