= Captain Robert Bennet Forbes House =

Historic house in Massachusetts, United States

- Capt. Robert B. Forbes House
- U.S. National Register of Historic Places
- U.S. National Historic Landmark
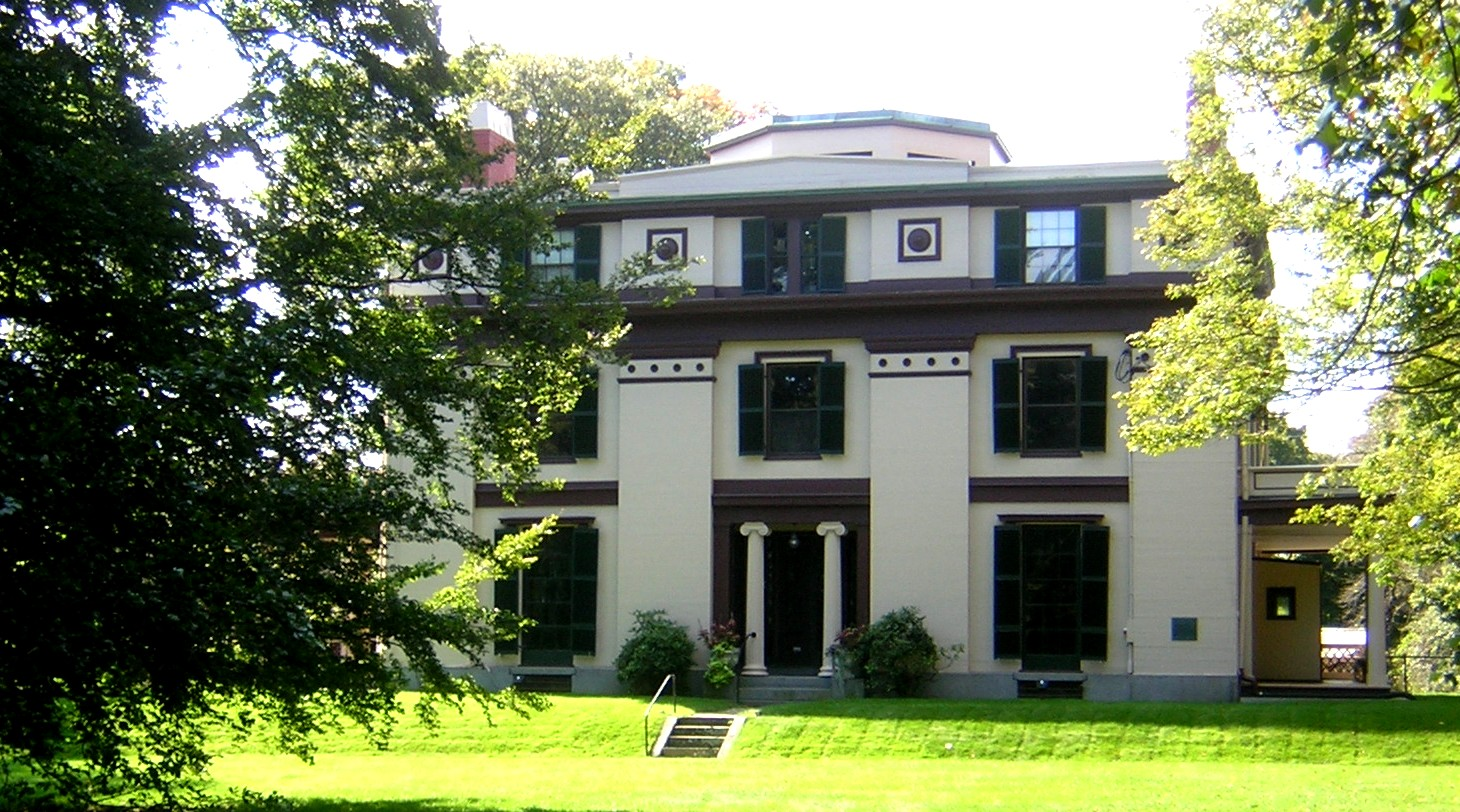
- Front facade, in 2009

- Location within Massachusetts Location within the United States
- Location: Milton, Massachusetts
- Coordinates: 42°15′52.52″N 71°3′54.32″W
- Built: 1833
- Architect: Isaiah Rogers
- Architectural style: Greek Revival
- NRHP reference No.: 66000651

Significant dates
- Added to NRHP: November 13, 1966
- Designated NHL: November 13, 1966

The Captain Robert Bennet Forbes House, also known as the R. B. Forbes House and Forbes House Museum (and formerly as the American China Trade Museum), is a house museum located at 215 Adams Street, Milton, Massachusetts. It is now a National Historic Landmark, and is open to the public.

== Overview ==
This house museum displays the history of an American entrepreneurial family involved in the China Trade, primarily in opium, in the mid to late 19th century. The house was built in 1833 for Margaret Perkins, by her sons Captain Robert Bennet Forbes and John Murray Forbes, and their sisters. It was designed in an unusual Greek Revival style by Boston architect Isaiah Rogers. It is now one of two surviving examples of Rogers' early domestic work.

Rogers and Captain Forbes collaborated on the design, which included nautical elements. Its interior retains many original features, including an elliptical staircase (resembling those of lighthouses) rising through three stories, leading to a cupola to view ships arriving at Boston Harbor. It has walls 18 inches (46 cm) thick, which were originally sheathed with shiplap siding. A partial upper floor was originally illuminated by porthole windows; this was altered in the 1880s, when the roof was raised and sash windows were installed. The interior has been little altered, primarily by the addition of 20th-century conveniences, including plumbing and electricity. Interior additions (1872) include tiled fireplace surrounds in the High Victorian Gothic style.

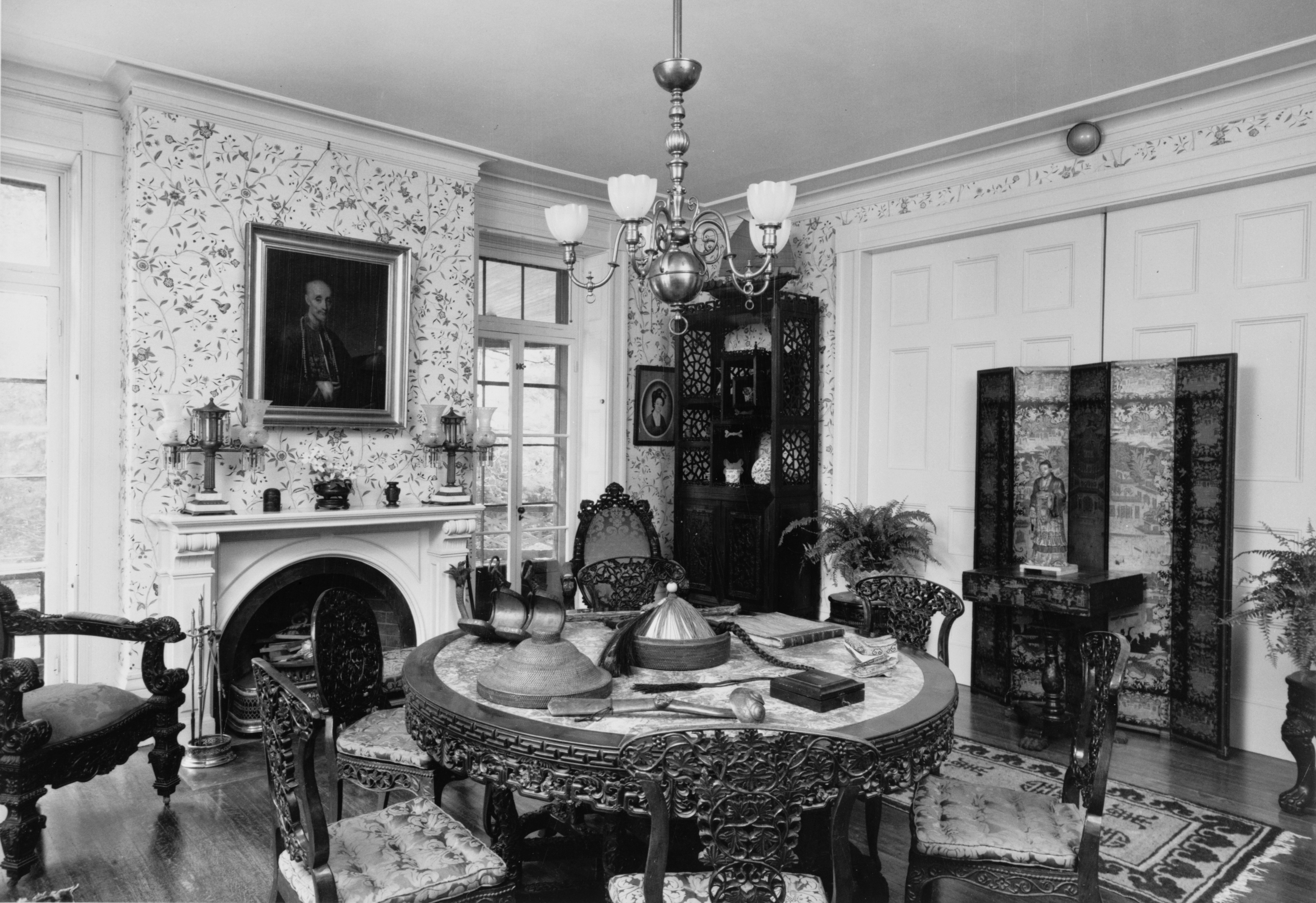
The parlor

The house was used by four Forbes family generations, until 1962. It was opened as a museum by descendant H. A. Crosby Forbes in 1964. Today it is furnished with the family's furniture, art, and American, European, and Old China Trade heirlooms. The museum also contains a large collection of Abraham Lincoln memorabilia collected by Captain Forbes's granddaughter, Mary Bowditch Forbes. A replica of Lincoln's birthplace cabin was constructed on the grounds.

== Family members that lived in the house ==
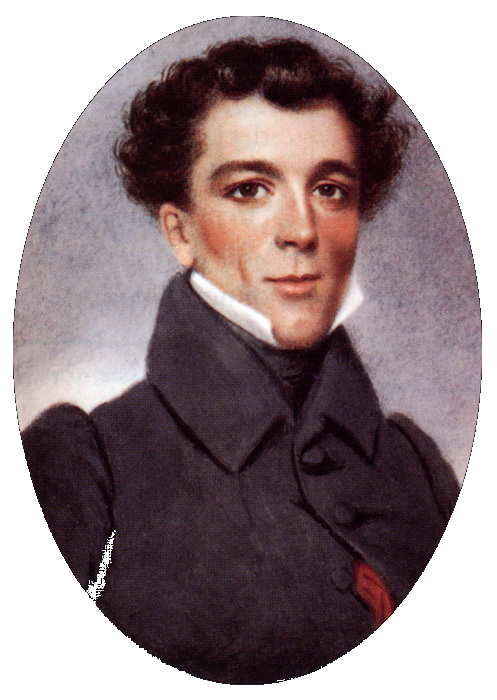
Robert Bennet Forbes (1804-1889)

Margaret Perkins Forbes (1773–1856)

Margaret Perkins was the first resident of the Forbes House, as the residence was built for her. She was the youngest sister of 3 brothers from one of the most important and wealthiest families in Boston.

Capt. Robert Bennet Forbes (1804–1889) and John Murray Forbes (1813–1898)

These brothers were two of seven children born to Margaret Perkins and Ralph Bennet Forbes (1773–1824). Both were involved in sea voyages from young ages, and earned their living in the China trade. The brothers built this house for their mother in honor of their brother, Thomas Tunno Forbes, who died in a typhoon at the age of 26. Both lived on Adams st., but not in this house.

James Murray Forbes (1845–1937) and Alice Francis Bowditch (1848–1929)

After the deaths of Mary Perkins and her daughters, the Captain's son James and his wife occupied the House. They are responsible for many of the renovations to the house that took place in the 1870s.

Mary Bowditch Forbes (1878–1962)

The last person to live in this house was Mary Bowditch Forbes. She admired President Lincoln and collected many memorabilia attached to his name. She even had a replica of Lincoln's log cabin built on the property in 1923.

== Museum collection ==
- Items belonging to the Forbes family
- Items from the China trade including porcelain, tea, and silk
- Artworks from the Forbes' personal collections
- Stories and pictures that interpret the history of the Forbes family and Milton, Massachusetts
- President Lincoln and Civil War items

== See also ==
- List of National Historic Landmarks in Massachusetts
- National Register of Historic Places listings in Milton, Massachusetts
