= Edward Forster =

Edward Forster may refer to:

- E. M. Forster (1879–1970), writer
- Edward Forster the Elder (1730–1812), English banker and antiquary
- Edward Forster the Younger (1765–1849), English banker and botanist, son of Edward Forster the Elder
- Edward Forster (writer) (1769–1828), English cleric and miscellaneous writer
