= Benjamin Forster (antiquary) =

English antiquary (1736–1805)

The Reverend Benjamin Forster
- Born: 7 August 1736; Walbrook, London, England
- Died: 2 December 1805 (aged 69); Boconnoc, England
- Education: Corpus Christi College, Cambridge (B.A., 1757; M.A., 1760; B.D., 1768)
- Occupation(s): Antiquary, clergyman
- Relatives: Edward Forster the Elder (brother); Thomas Furly Forster (nephew); Benjamin Meggot Forster (nephew); Edward Forster the Younger (nephew); Susanna Dorothy (niece); Thomas Ignatius Maria Forster (great-nephew)

Benjamin Forster (7 August 1736 – 2 December 1805) was an English antiquary and clergyman.

== Life ==
Forster was born in Walbrook, London on 7 August 1736. He was the third son of Thomas Forster, a descendant of the Forsters of Etherston and Bamborough in Northumberland, and his wife Dorothy, granddaughter of Benjamin Furly, the friend and correspondent of John Locke. He was educated at Hertford school and at Corpus Christi College, Cambridge, where he had as friends and fellow-students the antiquarians Richard Gough and Michael Tyson. He graduated as B.A. in 1757, becoming M.A. and fellow of his college in 1760, and B.D. 1768. Having taken orders, ‘though he was never very orthodox,' he became in succession curate of Wanstead and of Broomfield and Chignal Smeely in Essex (1760), Lady Camden lecturer at Wakefield (1766), and rector of Boconnoc, Broadoak, and Cherichayes in Cornwall (1770). He died at Boconnoc parsonage on 2 December 1805, his tomb being, by his orders, merely inscribed 'Fui.'

== Works ==
Forster was somewhat eccentric, surrounding himself with pet animals, but he was a learned antiquary. His letters are preserved in John Nichols's Literary Anecdotes, ix. 648–50, and Literary Illustrations, v. 280–90, while many of Richard Gough's letters to him are in a volume privately printed at Bruges (1845–50) by his great-nephew, Thomas Ignatius Maria Forster, entitled Epistolarium Forsterianum. Among his other friends were the poets William Mason and Thomas Gray.
