= Thomas Furly Forster =

English botanist (1761–1825)

Thomas Furly Forster FLS
- Born: 5 October 1761; Walbrook, London, England
- Died: 28 October 1825 (aged 64); Walthamstow, London, England
- Spouse: Susanna Williams (m. 1788)
- Children: 5, including Thomas Ignatius Maria Forster
- Father: Edward Forster the Elder
- Relatives: Benjamin Meggot Forster (brother); Edward Forster the Younger (brother); Susanna Dorothy (sister); Thomas Ignatius Maria Forster (nephew); Benjamin Forster (uncle)
- Scientific career
- Fields: Botany
- Author abbrev. (botany): T.F.Forst.

Thomas Furly Forster FLS (5 September 1761 – 28 October 1825) was an English botanist.

== Life ==
Forster was born in Bond Street, Walbrook, on 5 September 1761, the eldest son of Edward Forster the Elder and his wife Susanna Furney. His father retired to Walthamstow in 1764, and, being an admirer of Jean-Jacques Rousseau, brought up his son on his principles. From his uncle Benjamin Forster he acquired a taste for antiquities, coins, prints, and plants. He was introduced to the Linnean system of classification by the Rev. John Dixon, and was further encouraged in his studies by Joseph Cockfield of Upton, Michael Tyson, Sir John Cullum, and Richard Warner, author of the Plantæ Woodfordienses (1771).

Forster was one of the first fellows of the Linnean Society, and he visited Tunbridge Wells annually. From 1796 to 1823 he mainly resided at Clapton, and, as he had grown hardy plants in his home at Walthamstow, then devoted himself to greenhouse exotics, giving assistance to the Loddiges family in establishing their nursery in Hackney.

In 1823 Forster, with his brother Benjamin, joined the committee of the Anti-Slavery Society. That year he moved to Walthamstow on the death of his mother, and died there 28 October 1825. He was a member of many scientific and philanthropic societies, and among his friends were Richard Porson and Richard Gough, as well as botanists: Sir James Edward Smith, Sir Joseph Banks, Jonas Dryander, James Dickson, Robert Brown, and Adam Afzelius.

He has been honoured in the name of Sedum fosterianum, which was first published by Sir James Edward Smith in English Botany (Engl. bot.) Vol. 26 on table 1802 in 1808. Forster was a friend of James Smith. When they were both fellows of the Linnean Society.

== Works ==
Between 1775 and 1782, Forster made many drawings of plants, studying exotic species in the garden of Thomas Sikes at Tryon's Place, Hackney. In 1784 there was printed a list of additions to Richard Warner's Plantæ Woodfordienses, attributed by Dryander to Thomas Forster.

With his brothers Forster drew up the county lists of plants in Gough's Camden (1789), and communicated on various plants to the Botanical Magazine and to English Botany. A 14-page list of the rare plants of Tunbridge Wells, c.1800, is attributed to him by Dryander; and in 1816 he published a Flora Tonbrigensis, dedicated to Sir James Edward Smith, which was reissued by his son in 1842.

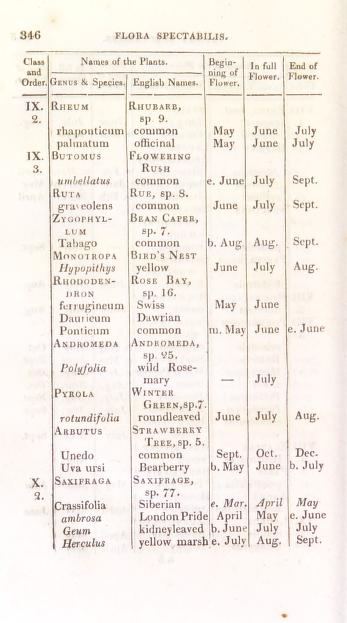
Page from The Pocket Encyclopædia of Natural Phenomena (1827) by Thomas Furly Forster

His fondness for animals made Forster refuse to prepare an account of the fauna. He contributed two papers to the Linnean Society's Transactions, and left an extensive hortus siccus of algæ, as well as of flowering plants, together with fossils, music, and more than a thousand drawings of churches and other ancient buildings, executed by himself. His natural history journals, including weather prognostics, were published by his son in 1827 as The Pocket Encyclopædia of Natural Phenomena.

The standard author abbreviation T.F.Forst. is used to indicate this person as the author when citing a botanical name.

== Family ==
In 1788 Forster married Susanna, daughter of Thomas Williams of West Ham, and niece of Mr. Sikes. He left two sons, one being Thomas Ignatius Maria Forster, and three daughters.
