= Edward Forster the Elder =

English banker and antiquary ((1730–1812)

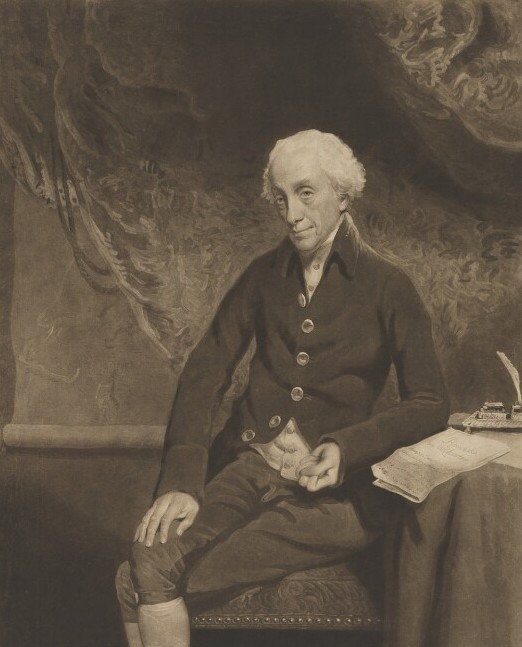
- Engraving by Charles Turner
- Born: Edward Forster; 11 February 1730
- Died: 20 April 1812 (aged 82)
- Occupation(s): Banker, antiquary
- Spouse: Susanna Furney
- Children: Thomas Furly Forster; Benjamin Meggot Forster; Edward Forster the Younger; Susanna Dorothy
- Relatives: Benjamin Forster (brother); Thomas Ignatius Maria Forster (grandson)

Edward Forster the Elder (11 February 1730 – 20 April 1812) was an English banker and antiquary.

== Life ==
Forster was the son of Thomas Forster, and brother of Benjamin Forster, born on 11 February 1730. He was educated at Felsted School. He then visited the Netherlands and his relative Benjamin Furly.

In 1764 Forster settled at Walthamstow. He was a member of the Mercers' Company, a director of the London Docks, governor of the Royal Exchange, and, for nearly thirty years, of the Russia Company, in which capacity he gave an annual ministerial dinner. When consulted by Pitt as to a forced paper currency he was offered a baronetcy. He is stated to have been the introducer of bearded wheat from Smyrna.

He died at Hoe Street, Walthamstow, 20 April 1812. Joseph Addison, Jonathan Swift, and Jean-Jacques Rousseau were his favourite authors, and Thomas Gray, Richard Gough and Michael Tyson were among his personal friends. One of his letters (Epistolarium Forsterianum, i. 205–26) contains a reference to Gray's Elegy Written in a Country Churchyard in 1751.

His portrait was painted by Martin Archer Shee for the Mercers' Company in 1812, and by John Hoppner for the Royal Exchange; the latter was engraved by Charles Turner.

== Works ==
In 1774 he published the speeches made by him at the bar of the House of Commons on the linen and Russia trades. His other publication was Occasional Amusements, 1809, pp. 87, a volume of verse.

== Family ==
He married Susanna Furney, of a Somerset family, by whom he left three sons, Thomas Furly Forster (1761–1825), Benjamin Meggot Forster (1764–1829), and Edward Forster the Younger (1765–1849), and a daughter Susanna Dorothy (1757–1822), who married the Rev. J. Dixon, rector of Bincombe, Dorset. The collection of letters of John Locke that he was given by Benjamin Furly were published by a grandson, Thomas Ignatius Maria Forster.

== Notes ==
Attribution

This article incorporates text from a publication now in the public domain: "Forster, Edward (1730-1812)". Dictionary of National Biography. London: Smith, Elder & Co. 1885–1900.
