= Susanna Dorothy (Forster) Dixon =

British author (1757–1822)

Susanna Dorothy (Forster) Dixon (1757 – 1822) was an English writer who translated from the German, Uno von Troil's Letters on Iceland, and published in 1780. Much of this entry is based on an article by Benjamin Colbert titled "Women’s Travel Writing, 1780-1840: A Bio-Bibliographical Database," and published by University of Wolverhampton.

== Life ==
She was the eldest of Edward Forster the elder and his wife Susanna's seven children, and was born in Walbrook, London, on 1 August 1757. Her father retired to Walthamstow in 1764, where she was educated alongside her brothers Thomas Furly Forster, Benjamin Meggot Forster and Edward Forster the Younger. She was the niece of Benjamin Forster and the aunt of the polymath Thomas Ignatius Maria Forster. In 1798, she married the Rev. Francis Dixon fellow of St Benet's College Cambridge, and rector of Bincombe with Broadway, Dorset. They lived at Vicarage House, Henham, Essex. Following her husband's early death in 1801, she returned to live at the family home in Walthamstow, but continued her charitable work at Henham, ministering to the poor, to whom she bequeathed £100 in trust, the interest of which was to be distributed in food at Christmas. She died at Walthamstow on 9 October 1822, aged 65. She was buried with her husband in Henham.

== Works ==
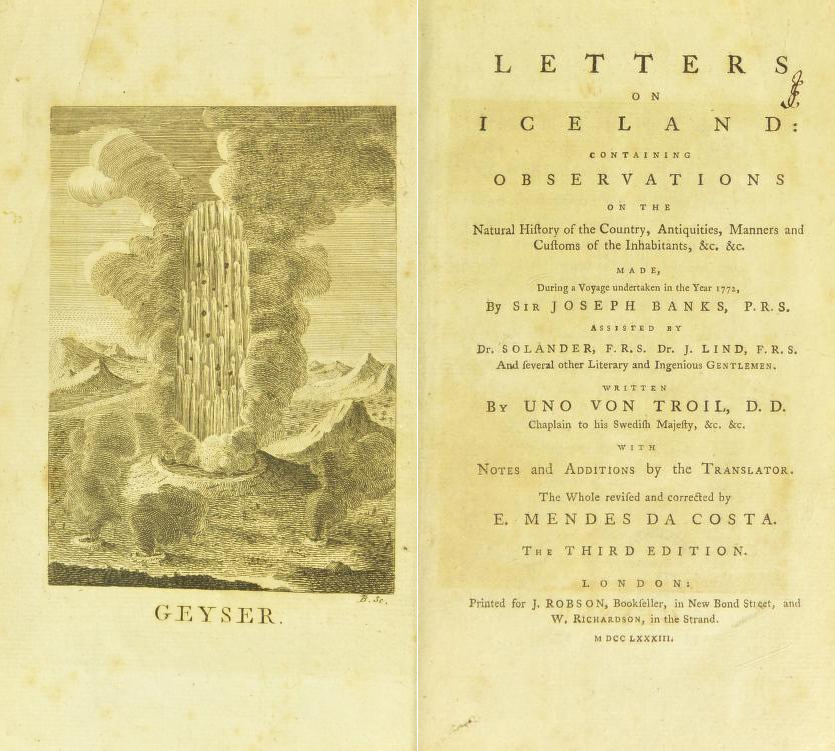
Uno von Troil's Letters on Iceland, translated by Susanna Dorothy Forster, First edition published London 1780

Following the family's move to Walthamstow, her father enjoyed increasing prosperity and influence in business, as well as his leisure pursuits: antiquarianism, sketching, and poetry. He formed lasting friendships with eminent men such as Thomas Gray, William Gilpin, and Richard Gough (Gough was also at Cambridge with her uncle Benjamin and he later bequeathed £100 each to Susannah Dorothy Dixon and her brothers). In these circles, Susannah, in her early twenties, undertook her project of translating the Swedish Lutheran bishop, Uno von Troil's Letters on Iceland from the German. Susanna's English translation, Letters on Iceland: containing observations on the civil, literary, ecclesiastical, and natural history; antiquities, volcanos, basaltes, hot springs; customs, dress, manners of the inhabitants, &c. &c. made, during a voyage undertaken in the year 1772, by Joseph Banks, assisted by Dr. Solander, Dr. J. Lind, Dr. Uno von Troil, and several other literary and ingenious gentlemen (originally written in Swedish and published at Upsala in 1777 and translated into German by J. G. P. Moller), was published in three editions, two in 1780 in London and Dublin and a final London edition in 1810. One of the contributors to the letters, was the family friend, Joseph Banks.

It is unclear whether the translation of Troil's letters was Susanna's only contribution to publishing. Susanna's obituary in The Gentleman's Magazine, details her attention to the poor of Henham, but makes no mention of her early literary work.
