= Samuel Henley =

English clergyman and schoolteacher

Samuel Henley D.D. (1740 – 1815) was an English clergyman, school teacher and college principal, antiquarian, and man of letters.

== Life ==
Born in England, he began his career when he was recruited as a professor of moral philosophy for the College of William & Mary, Williamsburg, Virginia. He arrived in 1770. Well-connected there, he became a friend of Thomas Jefferson, who acquired some of his library. He clashed though in public debate with Robert Carter Nicholas, Sr. and John Page, and failed to become rector of Bruton Parish Church.

In 1775 he went back to England, as a Loyalist taking leave from the college but never returning; he was a supporter of John Murray, 4th Earl of Dunmore, Virginia's governor, and with his colleague Thomas Gwatkin had been subject to intimidation by armed men. He obtained an assistant-mastership at Harrow School, and soon afterwards received a curacy at Northall in Middlesex. In 1778 he was elected a fellow of the Society of Antiquaries, and four years later he was presented to the living of Rendlesham in Suffolk. He continued to spend the greater part of his time at Harrow.

Henley maintained an extensive correspondence on antiquarian and classical subjects with Michael Tyson, Richard Gough, Dawson Turner, Thomas Percy, and other scholars of the time. In 1805 he was appointed principal of the newly established East India Company College at Hertford. He resigned this post in January 1815, and died on 29 December of the same year. He married in 1780 a daughter of Thomas Figgins of Chippenham, Wiltshire.

== Works ==
In 1779 Henley edited Travels in the Two Sicilies, by Henry Swinburne. In 1784 he published notes on an English translation of Vathek, written (but as yet unpublished) by William Thomas Beckford. The French original was not published until 1787. Stephen Weston stated in the Gentleman's Magazine in 1784 that Vathek had been composed by Henley himself as a text "for the purpose of giving to the public the information contained in the notes". Henley replied that his book was merely a translation from an unpublished French manuscript. Beckford, in the preface to the French version of 1815, mentions that the appearance of the English translation before his original was not his intention, and only attributes it to circumstances "peu intéressantes pour le public".

Henley was a frequent contributor to the Monthly Magazine. He also occasionally wrote short poems for private circulation among his friends.
