= Azathoth =

Fictional deity in the Cthulhu Mythos

- Cthulhu Mythos character
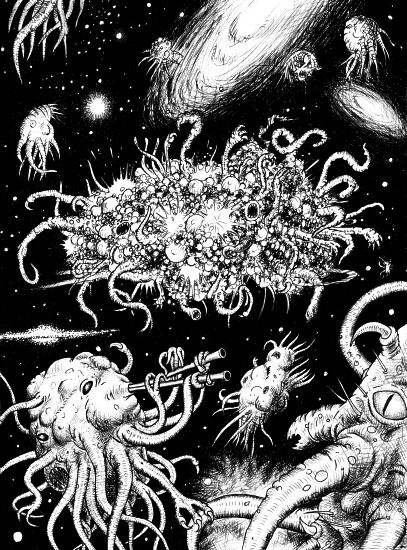
- Artist's depiction of Azathoth
- First appearance: "The Dream-Quest of Unknown Kadath"
- Created by: H. P. Lovecraft

In-universe information
- Species: Other God
- Gender: Male
- Title(s): Nuclear Chaos; Daemon Sultan; Blind Idiot God; Lord of All; Lord of All Things; Lord of Nighted Chaos
- Children: Nyarlathotep (son); Nameless Mist (offspring); Darkness (offspring)
- Relatives: Yog-Sothoth (grandson); Shub-Niggurath (granddaughter); Nug (great-grandchild); Yeb (great-grandchild); Wilbur Whateley (great-grandson); Cthulhu (great-great-grandson); Tsathoggua (great-great-grandson); Hastur (great-grandson); Ithaqua (great-great-grandson); Zhar and Lloigor (great-grandchild) and The Dark Young of Shub-Niggurath (great-grandchild)

Azathoth is a deity in the Cthulhu Mythos and Dream Cycle stories of writer H. P. Lovecraft and other authors. He is the supreme deity of the Cthulhu Mythos and the ruler of the Outer Gods, and may also be seen as a symbol for primordial chaos, therefore being the most powerful entity in the entirety of the Cthulhu Mythos.

Azathoth is referred to as the "Nuclear Chaos", "Daemon-Sultan", "Lord of All", and "Blind Idiot God", whose throne is at the center of "Ultimate Chaos". In his genealogy chart from 1933 of his mythos, Lovecraft places Azathoth as the single being at the very top from which everything else descends.

The name "Azathoth" was first mentioned in a 1919 note by Lovecraft and the entity was formally introduced in the novella The Dream-Quest of Unknown Kadath, completed in 1927, though not published until 1943. Azathoth was also the title of an unfinished novel fragment written by Lovecraft in 1922, published posthumously in 1938.

== H. P. Lovecraft ==
=== Inspiration ===
The first recorded mention of the name Azathoth was in a note Lovecraft wrote to himself in 1919 in his Commonplace Book that read simply, "AZATHOTH—hideous name". Mythos editor Robert M. Price argues that Lovecraft could have combined the biblical names Anathoth (Jeremiah's home town) and Azazel—mentioned by Lovecraft in "The Dunwich Horror". Price also points to the alchemical term "Azoth", which was used in the title of a book by Arthur Edward Waite, the model for the wizard Ephraim Waite in Lovecraft's "The Thing on the Doorstep".

Another note Lovecraft made to himself in the same Commonplace Book later in 1919 refers to an idea for a story: "A terrible pilgrimage to seek the nighted throne of the far daemon-sultan Azathoth." In a letter to Frank Belknap Long, Lovecraft ties this plot germ to Vathek, a supernatural novel by William Beckford about a wicked caliph. Lovecraft's attempts to work this idea into a novel floundered (a 500-word fragment survives, first published under the title "Azathoth" in the journal Leaves in 1938), although Lovecraft scholar Will Murray suggests that Lovecraft recycled the idea into his Dream Cycle novella The Dream-Quest of Unknown Kadath, written in 1926.

Price sees another inspiration for Azathoth in Lord Dunsany's Mana-Yood-Sushai, from The Gods of Pegana, a creator deity "who made the gods and thereafter rested." In Dunsany's conception, Mana-Yood-Sushai sleeps eternally, lulled by the music of a lesser deity who must drum forever, "for if he cease for an instant then Mana-Yood-Sushai will start awake, and there will be worlds nor gods no more." This oblivious creator god accompanied by supernatural musicians is a clear prototype for Azathoth, Price argues.

=== Fiction ===
A short story titled Azathoth by Lovecraft written in June 1922, portrays a day dreamer who slips into a dream world after habitually peering out to the stars from the window of his urban residence.

The Dream-Quest of Unknown Kadath, completed in January 1927 was perhaps the second fiction by Lovecraft to mention Azathoth, and describes his realm as being beyond any and everything, and in which no dreams reach, placing it beyond the Dreamlands:

There were, in such voyages, incalculable local dangers; as well as that shocking final peril which gibbers unmentionably outside the ordered universe, where no dreams reach; that last amorphous blight of nethermost confusion which blasphemes and bubbles at the centre of all infinity—the boundless daemon-sultan Azathoth, whose name no lips dare speak aloud, and who gnaws hungrily in inconceivable, unlighted chambers beyond time amidst the muffled, maddening beating of vile drums and the thin, monotonous whine of accursed flutes; to which detestable pounding and piping dance slowly, awkwardly, and absurdly the gigantic ultimate gods, the blind, voiceless, tenebrous, mindless Other Gods whose soul and messenger is the crawling chaos Nyarlathotep.

Verse 22 of Lovecraft's 1929 poetry cycle Fungi from Yuggoth is entitled "Azathoth", and consists of the following:

Out in the mindless void the daemon bore me
Past the bright clusters of dimensioned space,
Till neither time nor matter stretched before me,
But only Chaos, without form or place.
Here the vast Lord of All in darkness muttered
Things he had dreamed but could not understand,
While near him shapeless bat-things flopped and fluttered
In idiot vortices that ray-streams fanned.
They danced insanely to the high, thin whining
Of a cracked flute clutched in a monstrous paw,
Whence flow the aimless waves whose chance combining
Gives each frail cosmos its eternal law.
"I am His Messenger," the daemon said,
As in contempt he struck his Master's head.

The realm in Fungi from Yuggoth is described as the chaos that is beyond dimensioned space, time, matter, form, and place. The "daemon" that claims to be Azathoth's messenger is identified by later authors as Nyarlathotep, another of Lovecraft's deities.

Fritz Leiber describes Azathoth as the only Lovecraftian entity that is unarguably a deity instead of a powerful alien. Leiber says he is the "perfect personification of the purposeless, mindless, cruelly indifferent cosmos of materialistic belief".

Lovecraft referred to Azathoth again in "The Whisperer in Darkness" (1931), where the narrator relates that he "started with loathing when told of the monstrous nuclear chaos beyond angled space which the Necronomicon had mercifully cloaked under the name of Azathoth". Here "nuclear" most likely refers to Azathoth's central location at the nucleus of the cosmos and not to nuclear energy, which did not truly come of age until after Lovecraft's death.

In "The Dreams in the Witch House" (1932), the protagonist Walter Gilman dreams that he is told by the witch Keziah Mason that "He must meet the Black Man, and go with them all to the throne of Azathoth at the centre of ultimate Chaos… He must sign in his own blood the book of Azathoth and take a new secret name… What kept him from going with her...to the throne of Chaos where the thin flutes pipe mindlessly was the fact that he had seen the name 'Azathoth' in the Necronomicon, and knew it stood for a primal horror too horrible for description." Gilman wakes from another dream remembering "the thin, monotonous piping of an unseen flute", and decides that "he had picked up that last conception from what he had read in the Necronomicon about the mindless entity Azathoth, which rules all time and space from a curiously environed black throne at the centre of Chaos". He later fears finding himself "in the spiral black vortices of that ultimate void of Chaos wherein reigns the mindless daemon-sultan Azathoth". Gilman notes that the realm itself "obeyed laws unknown to the physics and mathematics of any conceivable cosmos".

The fictional poet Edward Pickman Derby, the protagonist of Lovecraft's "The Thing on the Doorstep", collects "nightmare lyrics" in a book called Azathoth and Other Horrors.

The last major reference in Lovecraft's fiction to Azathoth was in 1935's "The Haunter of the Dark", which tells of "the ancient legends of Ultimate Chaos, at whose center sprawls the blind idiot god Azathoth, Lord of All Things, encircled by his flopping horde of mindless and amorphous dancers, and lulled by the thin monotonous piping of a demonic flute held in nameless paws". His title of "blind idiot god" is not to be taken as being of lesser intelligence or ignorance, but rather that Azathoth is detached from human affairs and is incomprehensible to the human mind. However, in later works, it is sometimes said to have been stripped of its intelligence by the Elder Gods, while at other times it is suggested that it is called "blind idiot god" precisely because it is irrational and primordial. David Punter says that Lovecraft chose words to describe Azathoth with little regard to their literal meaning and instead arranged them like an incantation. In Punter's view, Azathoth represents Lovecraft's fear that irrationality could destroy the natural order. Thus, Azathoth can not be sought or understood in any meaningful way.

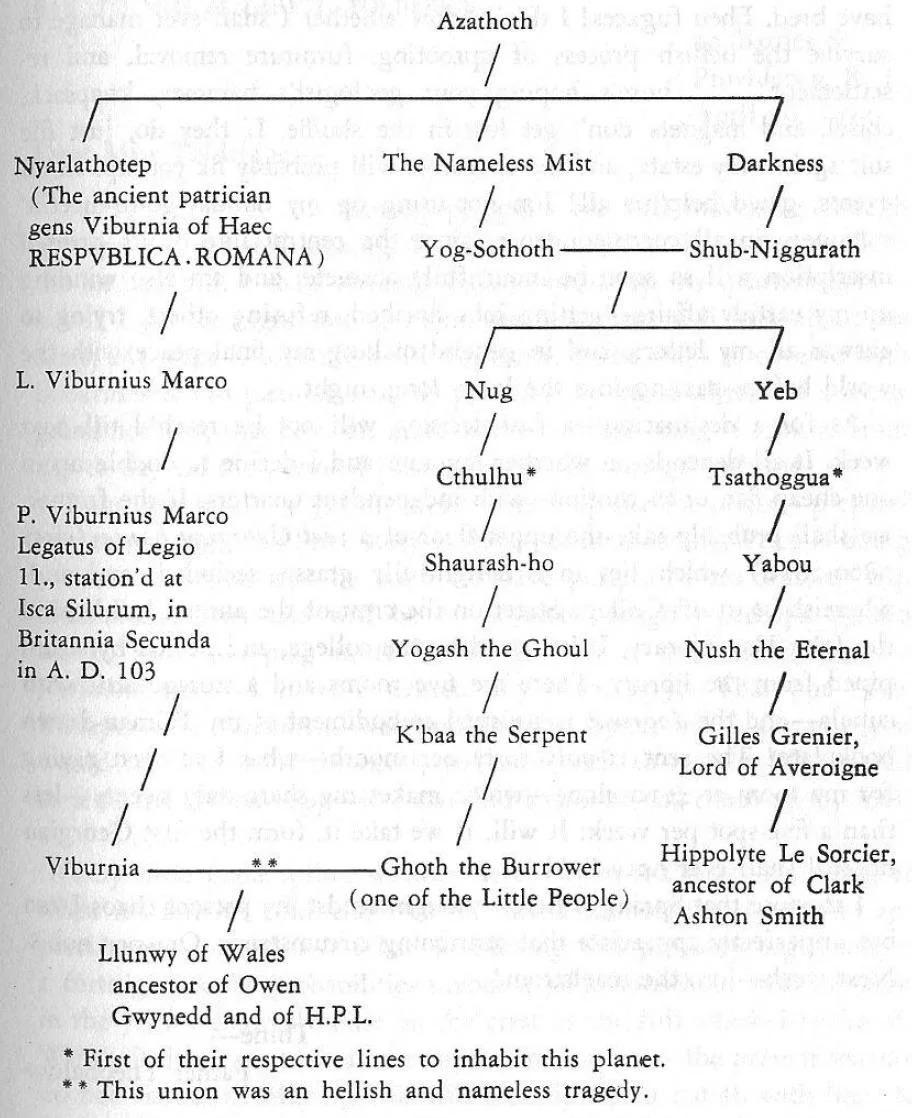
Genealogy of Cthulhu mythos (1933)

In a letter to a James F. Morton in April of 1933, Lovecraft details a family tree containing his mythos, with Azathoth at the top of the tree, in which all beings below descend from it, with Lovecraft himself posited at the bottom of the tree. With Azathoth the ancestor, his creation goes through his children such as Nyarlathotep, "The Nameless Mist," and "Darkness," of Yog-Sothoth, Shub-Niggurath, Nug and Yeb, Cthulhu, Tsathoggua, and several deities and monsters that are unmentioned outside the letter, and some of Lovecraft's and Clark Ashton Smith's fancifully posited human forebears.

== The Azathoth Cycle ==
In 1995, Chaosium published The Azathoth Cycle, a Cthulhu Mythos anthology focusing on works referring to or inspired by the entity Azathoth. Edited by Lovecraft scholar Robert M. Price, the book includes an introduction by Price tracing the roots and development of the Blind Idiot God.

== Sources ==
- Harms, Daniel (1998). The Encyclopedia Cthulhiana (2nd ed.). Oakland, CA: Chaosium. ISBN 1-56882-119-0.
- Petersen, Sandy (April 2001). Call of Cthulhu (5th ed.). Oakland, CA: Chaosium. ISBN 1-56882-148-4.
- Price, Robert M. (e.d.) (1995). The Azathoth Cycle (1st ed.). Oakland, CA: Chaosium. ISBN 1-56882-040-2.
