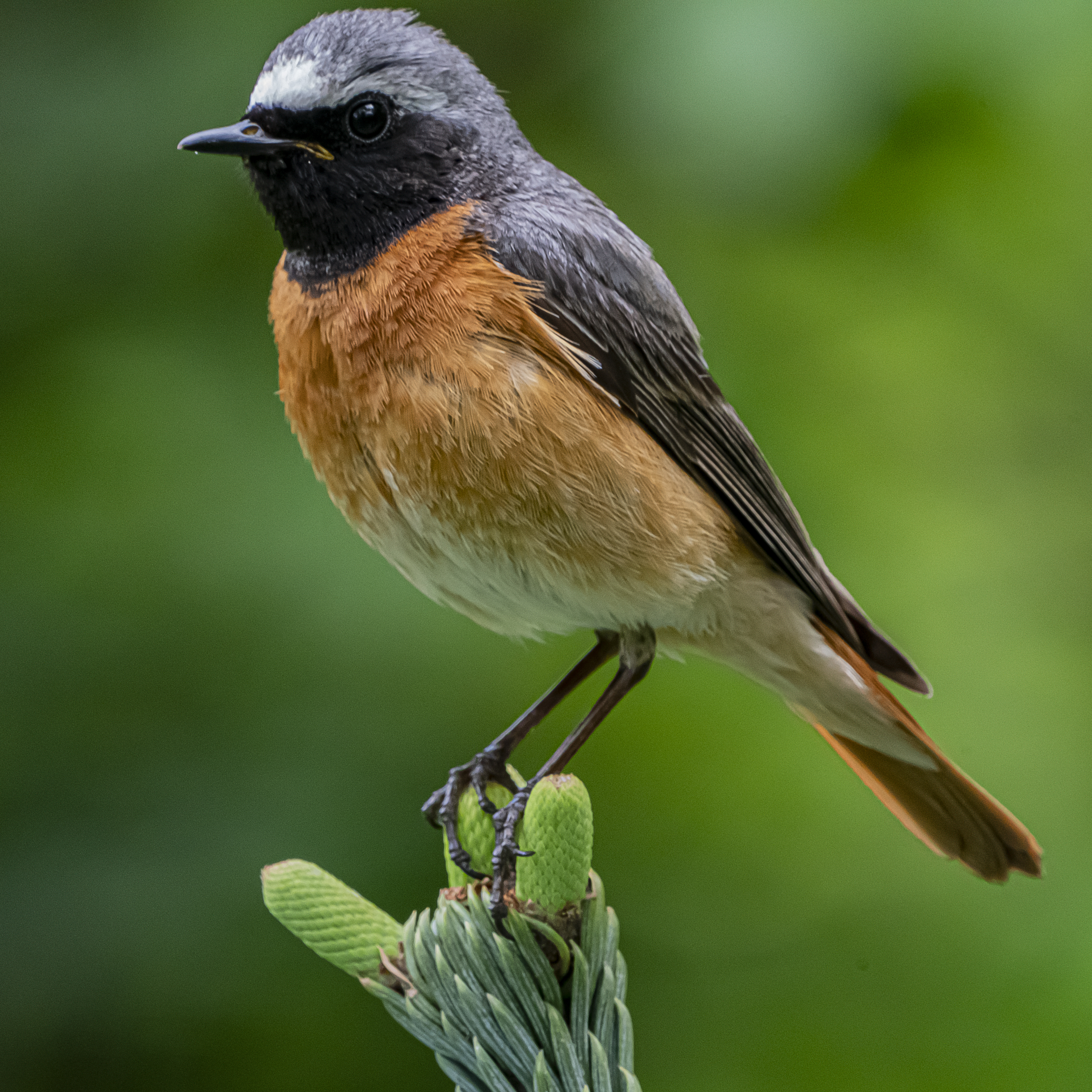
- Male in Łódź, Poland Song recorded in England

Conservation status
- Least Concern (IUCN 3.1)

Scientific classification
- Kingdom: Animalia
- Phylum: Chordata
- Class: Aves
- Order: Passeriformes
- Family: Muscicapidae
- Genus: Phoenicurus
- Species: P. phoenicurus

Binomial name
- Phoenicurus phoenicurus (Linnaeus, 1758)

Subspecies
- Phoenicurus phoenicurus phoenicurus; nominate common redstart: Phoenicurus phoenicurus samamisicus; 'Ehrenberg's redstart'
- Distribution of common redstart Breeding Passage Non-breeding

Synonyms
- Motacilla phoenicurus Linnaeus, 1758

= Common redstart =

Species of bird

The common redstart (Phoenicurus phoenicurus), or often simply redstart, is a small passerine bird in the genus Phoenicurus. Like its relatives, it was formerly classed as a member of the thrush family, (Turdidae), but is now known to be an Old World flycatcher (family Muscicapidae).

== Taxonomy and systematics ==
The first formal description of the common redstart was by the Swedish naturalist Carl Linnaeus in 1758 in the tenth edition of his Systema Naturae under the binomial name Motacilla phoenicurus. The genus Phoenicurus was introduced by the English naturalist Thomas Forster in 1817. The genus and species name phoenicurus is from Ancient Greek phoinix, "red", and -ouros -"tailed".

Two subspecies are accepted. The nominate P. p. phoenicurus is found all over Europe and reaches into Siberia. To the southeast, subspecies P. p. samamisicus, sometimes called 'Ehrenberg's redstart', is found from the Crimean Peninsula and Greece through Turkey, the Caucasus, the Middle East, and into Central Asia. Adult males have white outer webs in the remiges, forming a pale to whitish wing-patch similar to the one seen in black redstart and Daurian redstart. This patch is also present but less conspicuous in some immature males, and sometimes in adult females. Some males exhibit a blackish mantle, too. Both subspecies intergrade widely in the southern Balkans and coastal Ukraine.

The closest genetic relative of the common redstart may be the Moussier's redstart, though incomplete sampling of the genus gives some uncertainty to this. Its ancestors were apparently the first redstarts to spread to Europe; they seem to have diverged from the black redstart group about 3 mya, during the Piacenzian. Genetically, common and black redstarts are still fairly compatible and can produce hybrids that appear to be healthy and fertile, but they are separated by different behaviour and ecological requirements so hybrids are rather rare in nature.

== Description ==
The Common Redstart shows some affinity to the European Robin in many of its habits and actions. It has the same general carriage, and chat-like behaviour, and is the same length at 13–14.5 cm (5.1–5.7 in) long but slightly slimmer and not quite as heavy, weighing 11–23 g (0.39–0.81 oz). The orange-red tail, from which it and other redstarts get their names ("start" is an old word for "tail"), is frequently quivered. Among common European birds, only the black redstart (Phoenicurus ochruros) has a similarly coloured tail.

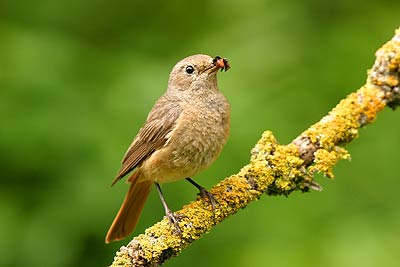
Female

The male in summer has a slate-grey head and upperparts, except the rump and tail, which, like the flanks, underwing coverts and axillaries are orange-chestnut. The forehead is white; the sides of the face and throat are black. The two central tail feathers are dark brown, the other tail feathers bright orange-red. The wings are grey-brown in male P. p. phoenicurus but the remiges have white outer webs forming a pale to whitish wing-patch in adult male P. p. samamisicus (see Taxonomy and systematics). The orange on the flanks shades to almost white on the belly. The bill and legs are black. In autumn, pale feather fringes on the body feathering obscure the colours of the male, giving it a washed-out appearance. The female is grey-brown above and buff-white or light orange below. In most females the throat is whitish, but some (older?) females show a dark bib, some even approaching males in appearance. In P. p. samamisicus, many females tend to show a light wing-patch, analogous to the males but much less prominent.

== Distribution and habitat ==
Common Redstarts prefer open mature birch, oak or, particularly in the north of the breeding range, conifer woodland with a high horizontal visibility and low amounts of shrub and understorey especially where the trees are old enough to have holes suitable for its nest. Other habitats of the species are orchards as well as villages, parks and old gardens in urban areas. In Britain the Common Redstart occurs primarily in upland areas less affected by agricultural intensification. Nests are built in cavities, e.g. natural tree holes, so dead trees or those with dead limbs are beneficial to the species; nestboxes are commonly used. A high cover of moss and lichen is also preferred.

In England, where it has declined by 55% in the past 25 years, the Forestry Commission offers grants under a scheme called England's Woodland Improvement Grant (EWIG); as does Natural Englands Environmental Stewardship Scheme. It is a very rare breeding bird in Ireland, with between one and five pairs breeding in most years, nearly all of them in County Wicklow.

== Behaviour and ecology ==
It is a summer visitor throughout most of Europe and western Asia (east to Lake Baikal), and also in northwest Africa in Morocco. It winters in central Africa and Arabia, south of the Sahara Desert but north of the Equator, from Senegal east to Yemen. It is widespread as a breeding bird in Great Britain, particularly in upland broadleaf woodlands and hedgerow trees, but in Ireland it is very local, and may not breed every year.

The first males arrive in early to mid April, often a few days in advance of the females. Five or six light blue eggs are laid during May, with a second brood in midsummer in the south of the breeding range. It departs for Africa between mid-August and early October. It often feeds like a flycatcher, making aerial sallies after passing insects, and most of its food consists of winged insects. The main contact call in Central Europe is a rising, slightly dissylabilic huid. In southern Italy and as well as within the range of the subspecies P. p. samamisicus this call is replaced by a monosyllabic heed. This call can be rising or constant in Italy but is always constant and reminiscent of the slightly higher pitched contact calls of Collared Flycatcher Ficedula albicollis in P. p. samamisicus. A third call variant exists on the Iberian peninsula, whereas in Siberia huid and heed calls can be combined. All call variants are regularly combined with ticking alarm calls.

The male's song consists of soft melancholy strophes lasting 1–2 seconds that can be divided into three parts: an introduction, a repetitive part and a more variable third part. This structure seems to be very constant across the breeding range of the nominate subspecies, but is more variable in P. p. samamisicus where the introduction only rarely consists solely of a clear whistle similar to that of nominate P. p. phoenicurus.

Common Redstarts are sometimes parasitised by common cuckoos. Surprisingly, redstart chicks did not suffer from sharing the nest with a cuckoo chick. The presence of a cuckoo might even be beneficial for the nestlings. The large size of the cuckoo chick affects the thermoregulation in the nest. In some sense, the cuckoo chick is 'brooding' the redstart nestlings. Moreover, food provision might be better for redstart chicks in a mixed brood.

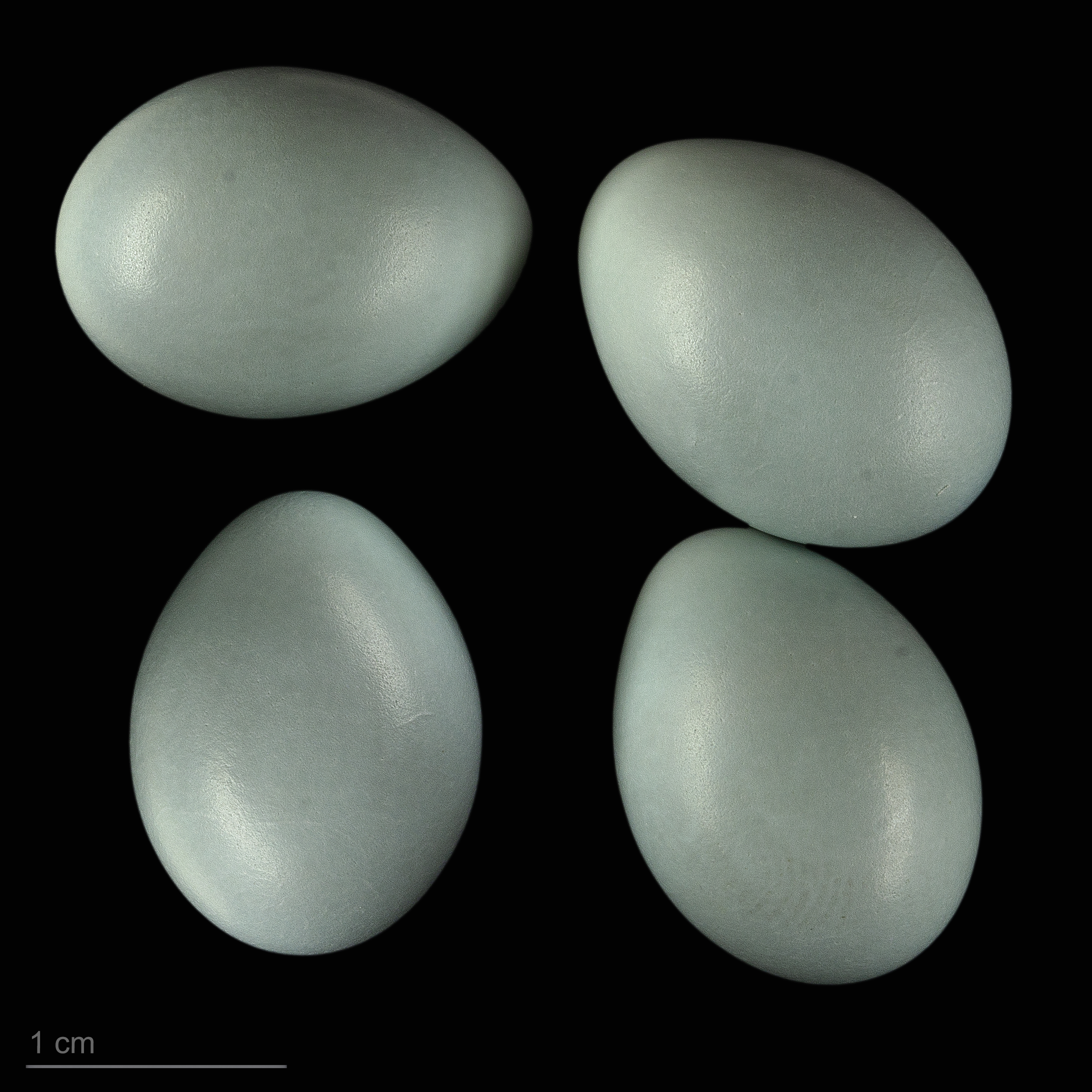
Phoenicurus phoenicurus phoenicurus - MHNT

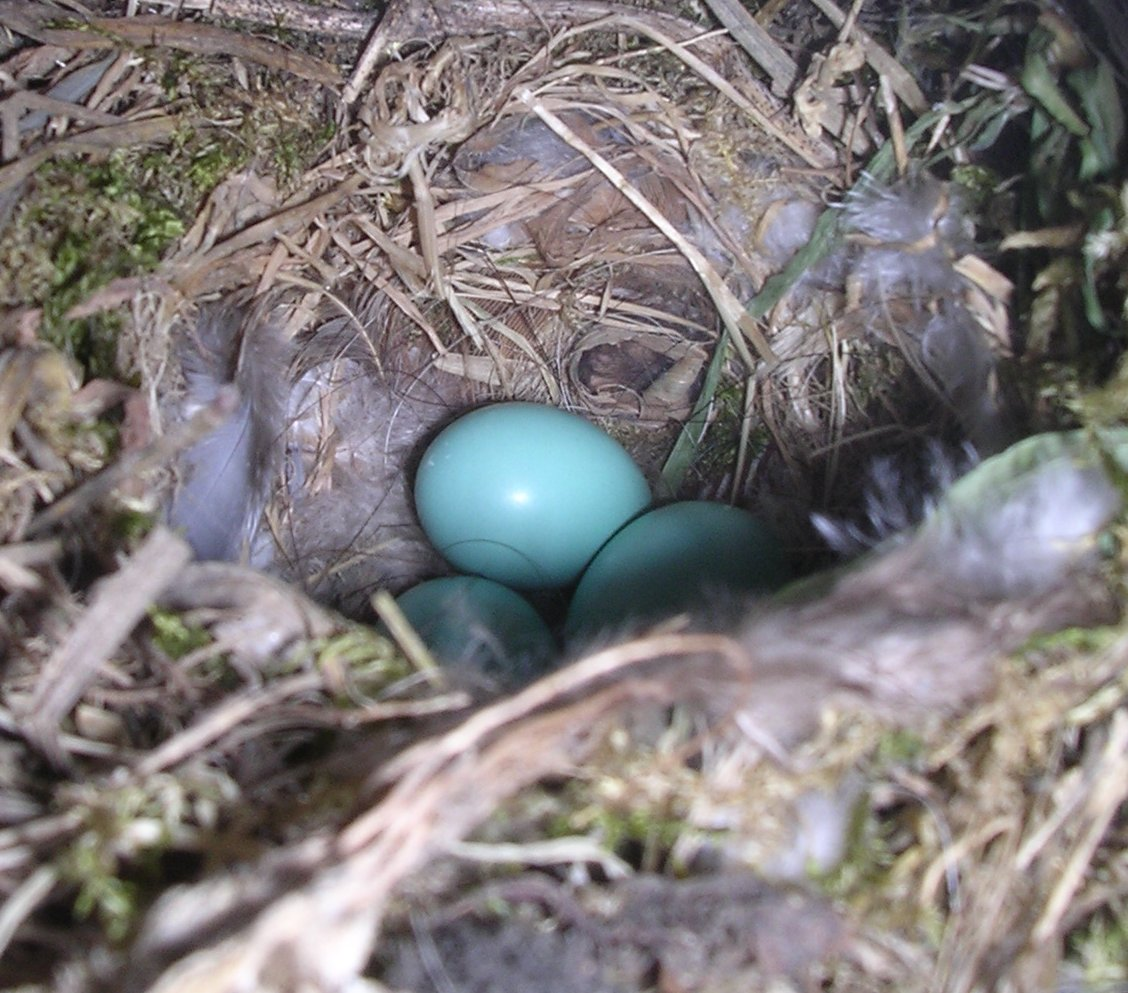
Nest with a clutch of eggs showing typical bluish colour

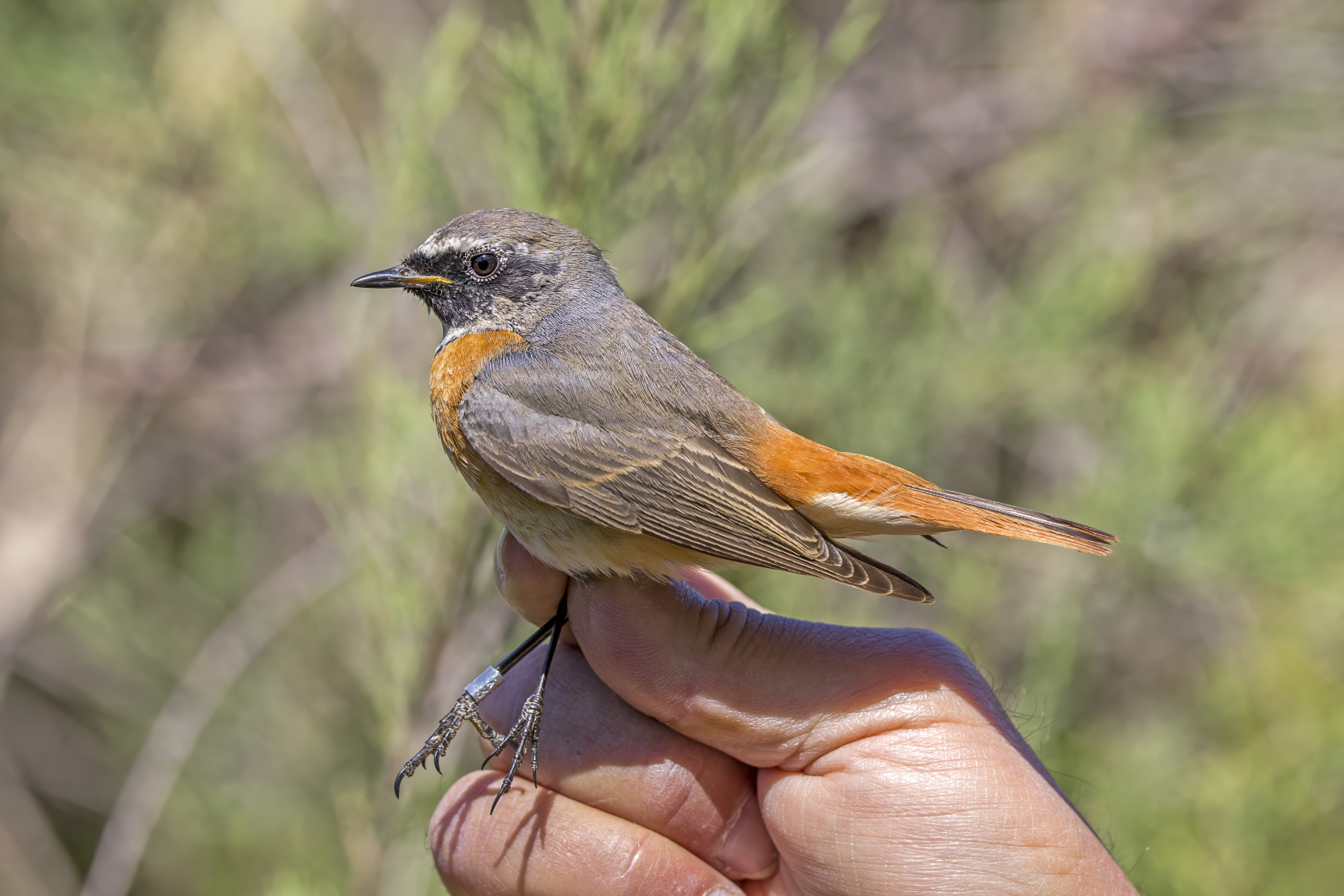
Male, ringed in Malta

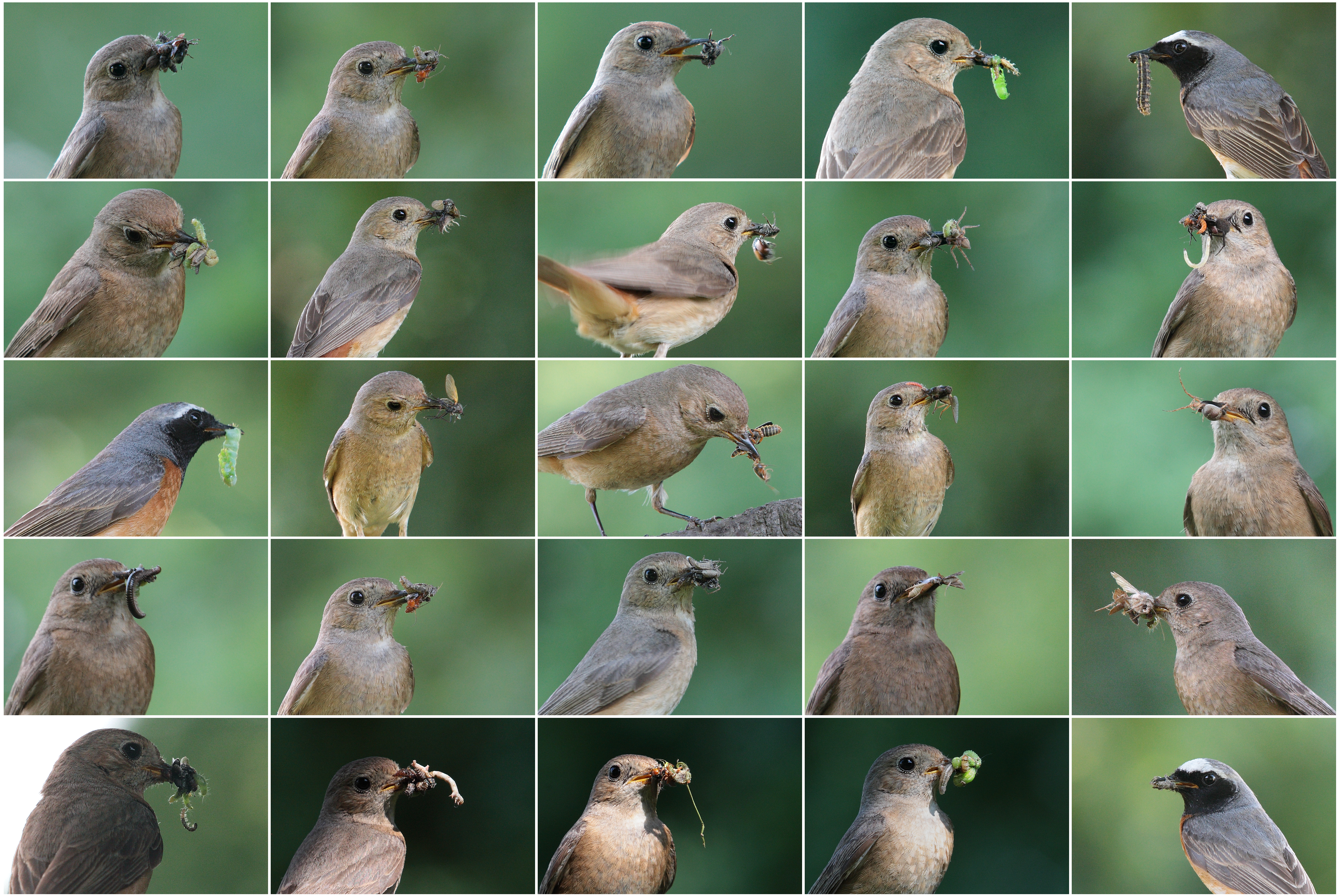
Common redstart diet
