= Benjamin Meggot Forster =

British botanist (1764–1829)

- Born: 16 January 1764; Walbrook, London, England
- Died: 8 March 1829 (aged 65); Walthamstow, London, England
- Father: Edward Forster the Elder
- Relatives: Thomas Furly Forster (brother); Edward Forster the Younger (brother); Susanna Dorothy (sister); Thomas Ignatius Maria Forster (nephew); Benjamin Forster (uncle)
- Scientific career
- Fields: Botany, mycology
- Author abbrev. (botany): B.M.Forst.

Benjamin Meggot Forster (16 January 1764 – 8 March 1829) was an English botanist and mycologist who published An Introduction to the Knowledge of Fungusses in 1820.

== Life ==
Forster was the second son of Edward Forster the elder and his wife Susanna, and was born in Walbrook, London, on 16 January 1764. He was educated with his brothers Edward Forster the younger and Thomas Furly Forster and sister, Susanna Dorothy Forster at Walthamstow, and became a member of the firm of Edward Forster & Sons, Russia merchants, but took little interest in business.

Forster never married, living with his father and mother till their death, when he took a cottage called Scotts, at Hale End, Walthamstow. There he died 8 March 1829.

== Works ==
Forster was a student of science, especially botany and electricity. He executed many drawings of fungi, communicated various species to James Sowerby, and in 1820 published, with initials only, An Introduction to the Knowledge of Fungusses, pp. 20, with two plates. He contributed articles to the Gentleman's Magazine under various signatures, and is credited with eight scientific contributions to the Philosophical Magazine in the Royal Society's Catalogue. They deal with fungi, the electric column, and atmospheric phenomena. He invented the sliding portfolio, the atmospherical electroscope, and an orrery of perpetual motion (a failure).

The standard author abbreviation B.M.Forst. is used to indicate this person as the author when citing a botanical name.

== Activism ==
Forster joined in 1791 the committee of the Society for the Abolition of the Slave Trade, as did his brother Thomas Furly Forster. He was a committee member of the Peace Society.

Around 1802 Forster was a founder of the Society for the Suppression of Climbing Chimney-Sweepers (properly from 1803 the SSNCB, Society for Superseding the Necessity of Climbing Boys), and took an interest in the inventions in the field of chimney sweeping, by George Smart and Joseph Glass. In 1819 he reported to its committee on the case of two small girls as sweeps, working at Windsor Castle. In fact four other members of the committee were from the Forster family. He framed the Child Stealing Act 1814. It was introduced as a bill in parliament on 17 May 1814, by William Smith.

He also joined societies for diffusing knowledge about capital punishments, for affording refuge to the destitute, and for repressing cruelty to animals, being conscientiously opposed to field sports.
