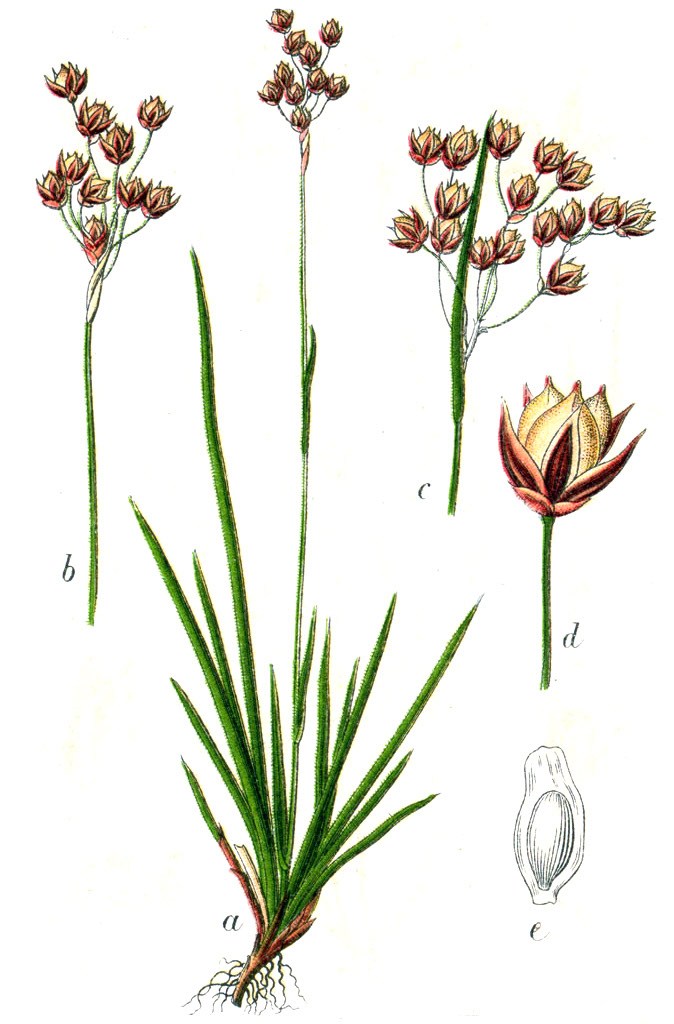

Scientific classification
- Kingdom: Plantae
- Clade: Embryophytes
- Clade: Tracheophytes
- Clade: Spermatophytes
- Clade: Angiosperms
- Clade: Monocots
- Clade: Commelinids
- Order: Poales
- Family: Juncaceae
- Genus: Luzula
- Species: L. forsteri

Binomial name
- Luzula forsteri (Sm.) DC.

Synonyms
- Juncus forsteri Sm.

= Luzula forsteri =

Species of flowering plant in the rush family

Luzula forsteri, commonly known as southern wood-rush, is a species of perennial plant in Juncaceae family that is native to Europe, north Africa and western Asia. There is a record of it having been collected at Salem, Oregon in 1910.

The species was named for Edward Forster the Younger (1765–1849).
