= Azathoth (short story) =

Novel fragment written by H.P. Lovecraft

- Short story by H. P. Lovecraft
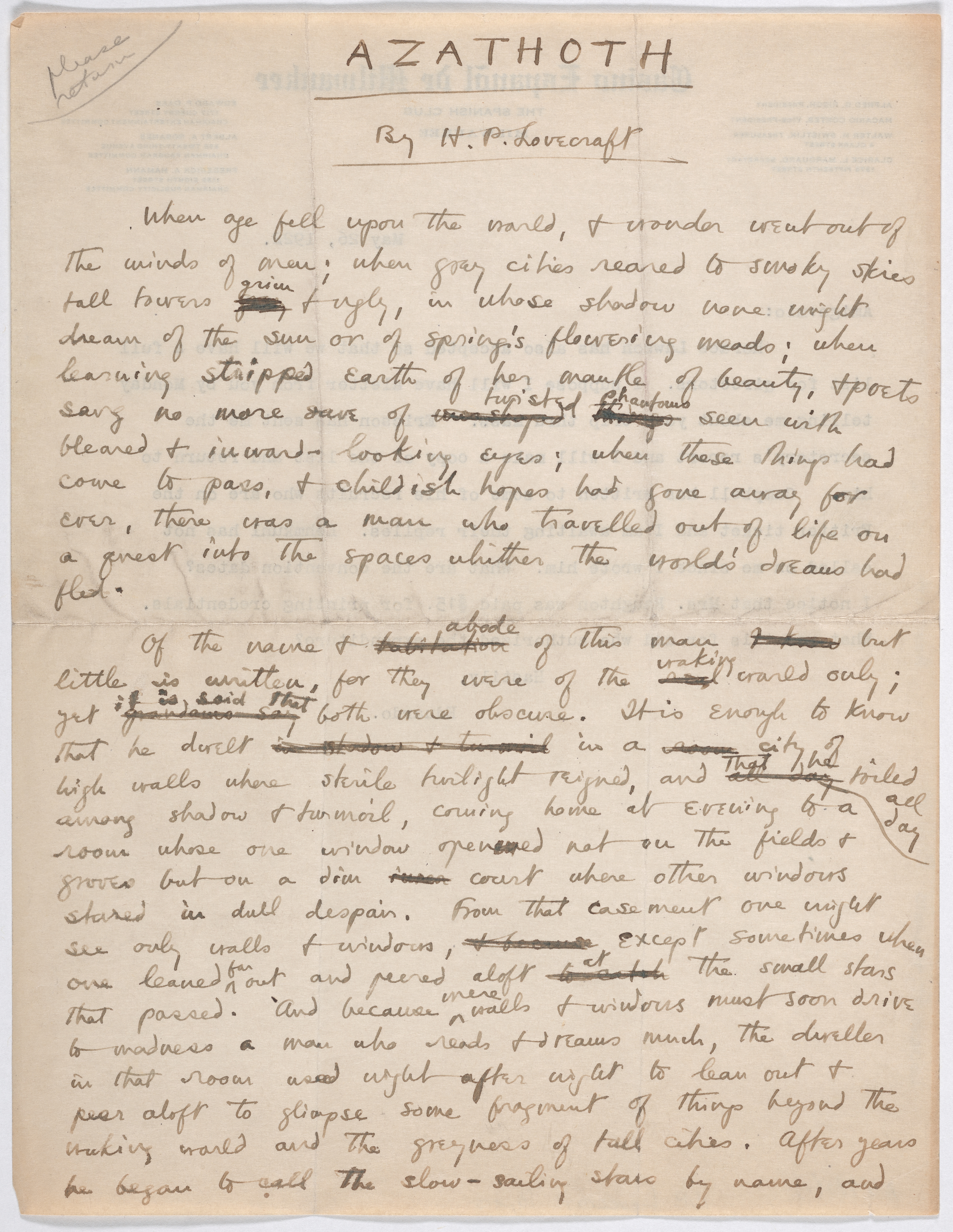
- First page of H. P. Lovecraft's original manuscript to "Azathoth"

Text available at Wikisource
- Country: United States
- Language: English
- Genre: Horror short story

Publication
- Published in: Leaves
- Publication date: 1938

"Azathoth" is the beginning of an incomplete novel written by American horror fiction writer H. P. Lovecraft. It was written in June 1922, and published as a fragment in the journal Leaves in 1938, after Lovecraft's death. It is the first piece of fiction to mention the fictional being Azathoth, one of the major entities in Lovecraft's Cthulhu Mythos, though the entity only appears in the title.

== Plot ==
The story begins by describing how the modern world has been stripped of imagination and belief in magic. The protagonist is an unnamed man who lives in a dull and ugly city. Every night for many years, the man gazes from his window upon the stars, until he comes over time to observe secret vistas unsuspected by normal humanity. One night, the gulf between his world and the stars is bridged, and his mind ascends from his body out unto the boundless cosmos.

== Inspiration ==
Lovecraft described his planned novel as a "weird Eastern tale in the 18th-century manner" and as a "weird Vathek-like novel", referring to a novel of Arabia written by William Thomas Beckford in 1786. Suggesting that his story would involve "material of the Arabian Nights type", he wrote that

I shall defer to no modern critical canon, but shall frankly slip back through the centuries and become a myth-maker with that childish sincerity which no one but the earlier Dunsany has tried to achieve nowadays. I shall go out of the world when I write, with a mind centred not in literary usage, but in the dreams I dreamed when I was six year old or less—the dreams which followed my first knowledge of Sinbad, of Agib, of Baba-Abdallah, and of Sidi-Nonman.

Lovecraft later wrote a novella with a similar theme, The Dream-Quest of Unknown Kadath.
