= Edward Forster the Younger =

English banker and botanist (1765–1849)

Edward Forster the Younger FLS
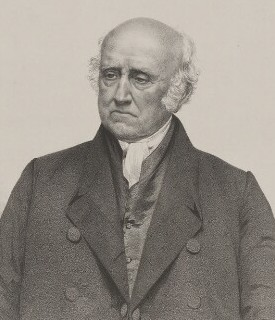
- Lithograph by Thomas Herbert Maguire
- Born: Edward Forster; 12 October 1765; Walthamstow, London, England
- Died: 23 February 1849 (aged 83); Woodford, London, England
- Spouse: Mary Jane (m. 1796; died 1846)
- Father: Edward Forster the Elder
- Relatives: Benjamin Meggot Forster (brother); Thomas Furly Forster (brother); Susanna Dorothy (sister); Thomas Ignatius Maria Forster (nephew); Benjamin Forster (uncle)
- Scientific career
- Fields: Botany
- Author abbrev. (botany): E.Forst.

Edward Forster the Younger FLS (12 October 1765 – 23 February 1849) was an English banker and botanist.

== Life ==
He was born at Wood Street, Walthamstow, 12 October 1765, the third and youngest son of Edward Forster the elder and his wife Susanna; Thomas Furly Forster and Benjamin Meggot Forster were his brothers and Susanna Dorothy Forster his sister. He received a commercial education in the Netherlands, and entered the banking-house of Forster, Lubbocks, Forster, & Clarke.

Forster took up botany in Epping Forest at age 15. With his two brothers he later cultivated in his father's garden almost all the herbaceous plants then grown, and contributed county lists of plants to Gough's edition of Camden (1789). He was one of the early fellows of the Linnean Society, founded in 1788, was elected treasurer in 1816, and vice-president in 1828. With his brothers he was one of the main founders of the Refuge for the Destitute in Hackney Road.

== Death and legacy ==
Forster resided mainly at Hale End, Walthamstow, but at the time of his death was at the Ivy House, Woodford, London. He died of cholera, 23 February 1849, two days after inspecting the Hackney Road Refuge on the occasion of an outbreak of the disease. He was buried in the family vault at Walthamstow. At his death his library and his herbarium, collected in many parts of England, were sold. Robert Brown bought the herbarium and presented it to the British Museum.

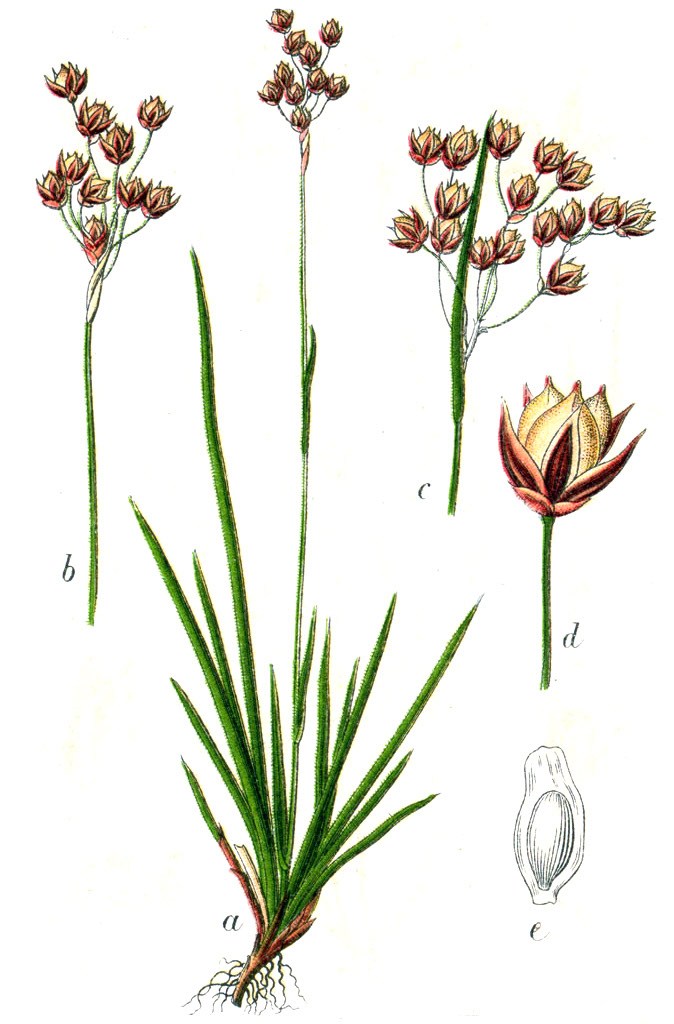
Luzula forsteri, named for Edward Forster

The species Luzula forsteri was named for Forster.

== Works ==
In 1817 Forster had printed a catalogue of British birds. Subsequently he concentrated on plants. He printed papers on critical species of British plants in the Transactions of the Linnean Society, the Annals and Magazine of Natural History, and The Phytologist.

Forster collected material on the flora of Essex. Several species described by him were in the Supplement to English Botany (1834).

The standard author abbreviation E.Forst. is used to indicate this person as the author when citing a botanical name.

== Family ==
In 1796 Forster married Mary Jane, only daughter of Abraham Greenwood, who died in 1846 without surviving issue.

== Notes ==
Attribution

This article incorporates text from a publication now in the public domain: Lee, Sidney, ed. (1897). "Forster, Edward (1765-1849)". Dictionary of National Biography. Vol. 50. London: Smith, Elder & Co.
