= Vathek =

1786 novel by William Beckford

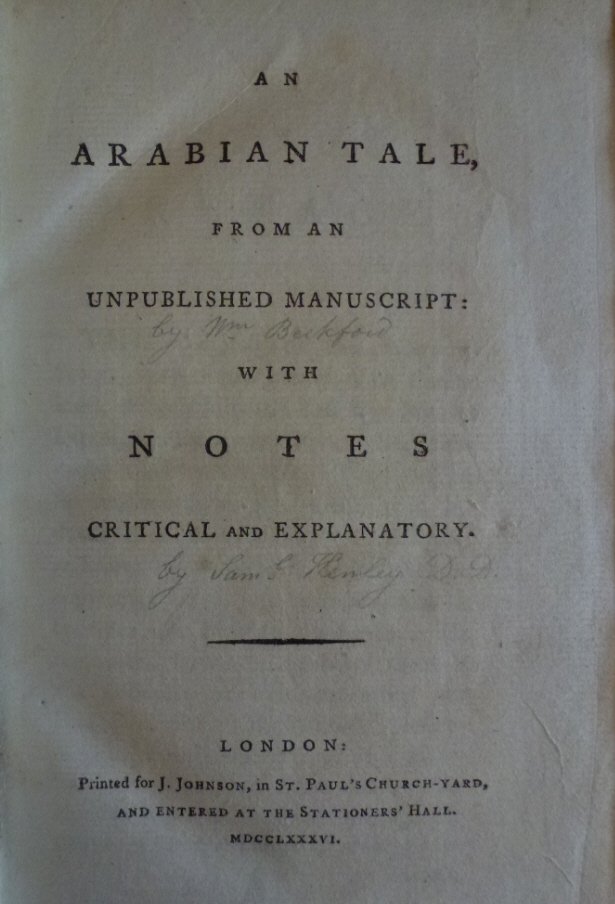
- Title page of the 1786 edition
- Author: William Beckford
- Translator: Reverend Samuel Henley
- Language: French
- Genre: Gothic novel
- Publisher: J. Johnson (English)
- Publication date: 1786 (English), 1787 (French)
- Publication place: United Kingdom
- Media type: Print (hardback)

Vathek (alternatively titled Vathek, an Arabian Tale or The History of the Caliph Vathek) is a Gothic novel written by William Beckford. It was composed in French beginning in 1782, and then translated into English by Reverend Samuel Henley in which form it was first published in 1786 without Beckford's name as An Arabian Tale, From an Unpublished Manuscript, claiming to be translated directly from Arabic. The first French edition, titled simply as Vathek, was published in December 1786 (postdated 1787). During the twentieth century some editions include The Episodes of Vathek (Vathek et ses épisodes), three related tales intended by Beckford to be so incorporated, but omitted from the original edition and published separately long after his death.

== Plot summary ==
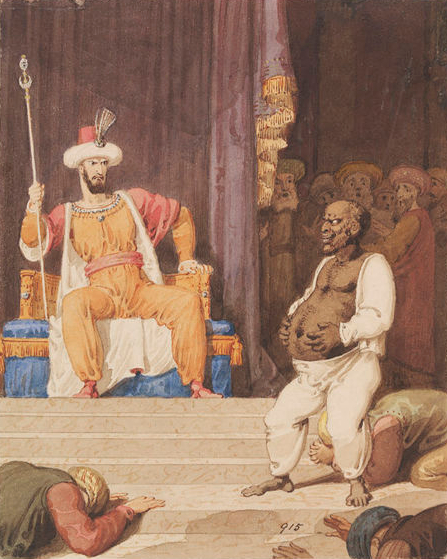
Vathek and Giaour, an illustration to William Beckford's Vathek in a late-18th to early–19th century illustration. Giaour is withstanding the angry and perilous glances of Vathek without the slightest emotion, while the courtiers fall prostrate with their faces on the ground.

Vathek, (Note: A corruption of al-Wathiq, the 9th caliph of the Abbasid Caliphate.) the ninth caliph of the Abassides, ascended to the throne at an early age. He is a fickle and depraved tyrant, known for his unquenchable thirst for knowledge, and often invites scholars to converse with him. If he fails to convince the scholar of his points of view, he attempts a bribe; if this does not work, he sends the scholar to prison. To better study astronomy, he builds an observation tower with 11,000 steps. Prophet Muhammad observes Vathek from the seventh heaven, but decides not to punish him, believing that the decadent caliph will bring about his destruction.

A hideous stranger whom Vathek calls "Giaour" (Note: an Ottoman a term used for non-believers.) arrives in Samarra, claiming to be a merchant from India selling Vathek magical treasures, but refuses to reveal their origin, causing Vathek to throw him in prison. The next day, he discovers that the merchant has escaped and his prison guards are dead. Depressed, Vathek loses his appetite and falls into a drunken stupor. His Greek mother Carathis, a practitioner of Zarathustrianism, arrives to comfort him.

Vathek develops an insatiable thirst, which the giaour later cures and the two men return to Samarra. At court, Vathek makes a fool of himself trying to out-drink the Giaour, and to out-eat him; when he sits upon the throne to administer justice, he does so haphazardly. His prime vizier rescues him from disgrace by whispering that Carathis had read a message in the stars foretelling a great evil to befall him. When Vathek confronts the giaour, he is met with laughter, enraging Vathek who kicks him. The giaour is transformed into a ball and Vathek compels everyone in the palace to kick it. Then Vathek has the whole town kick the giaour into a remote valley. Vathek stays in the area and eventually hears Giaour's voice telling him that if he worships the Giaour and the jinns of the earth, and renounces the teachings of Islam, he will bring Vathek great knowledge and the keys to the "Palace of Underground Fire" where Soliman Ben Daoud controls the talismans that rule over the world.

Vathek agrees and proceeds with the ritual that the giaour demands: to sacrifice fifty of the city's children. In return, Vathek will receive a key of great power. Vathek holds a "competition" among the children of the nobles, declaring that the winners will receive precious gifts. As the children approach Vathek for the competition, he throws them inside an ebony portal where the giaour feasts upon their blood. This enrages the residents of Samarra, who accuse him of murdering their children. Carathis pleads with Morakanabad to help save Vathek's life; the vizier complies and calms the crowd.

Vathek grows impatient with the giaour, and Carathis advises him to fulfill the pact and sacrifice to the jinn of the earth. Carathis helps him prepare the sacrifice: she and her son climb to the top of the tower and mix oils to create an explosion of light. The people of Samarra mistake the smoke rising from the tower for fire and rush to help the caliph, only to be burned alive as Carathis sacrifices them to the jinn. Carathis performs another ritual and learns that for Vathek to claim his reward, he must go to Istakhr.

Vathek sets off with his wives and servants, placing the city in the care of Morakanabad and Carathis. Eventually, they reach the mountains where Islamic dwarves reside. He stays with them and meets their Emir named Fakreddin, and the Emir's beautiful daughter Nouronihar. Vathek wants to marry her, but she is already in love with and promised to her effeminate cousin Gulchenrouz. The Emir and his servants plan to safeguard Nouronihar and Gulchenrouz by drugging them and hiding them in a valley by a lake. The plan succeeds temporarily, but when they awake in the valley, they believe they have died and are in purgatory. Nouronihar grows curious and wants to explore the area. Beyond the valley, she encounters Vathek, who seduces her.

In Samarra, Carathis can discover no news of her son from reading the stars. Vathek's favorite wife, the sultana Dilara, writes to Carathis, informing her that her son has broken the condition of the giaour's contract, by accepting Fakreddin's hospitality on the way to Istakhr. She asks him to drown Nouronihar, but Vathek refuses. Carathis then decides to sacrifice Gulchenrouz, but before she can catch him, Gulchenrouz jumps into the arms of a jinn who protects him. That night, Carathis hears that Motavakel, Vathek's brother, is planning to lead a revolt against Morakanabad. Vathek continues on his journey, reaches Roknabad, and degrades and humiliates its citizens for his pleasure.

A jinn asks Mohammed for permission to try to save Vathek from his eternal damnation, to which he agrees. He takes the form of a saintly shepherd who plays the flute to make men realize their sins. The shepherd asks Vathek if he is done sinning, warns Vathek about the fallen angel Iblis. The shepherd begs Vathek to renounce his wickedness and return to Islam, lest he be eternally damned. In his pride, Vathek rejects the offer and declares that he renounces Islam.

Vathek reaches Istakhr, where the giaour opens the gates, and Vathek and Nouronihar step through into a place of gold. The Giaour leads them to Iblis, who tells them that they may enjoy whatever his empire holds. Vathek asks to be taken to the talismans that govern the world. There, Soliman tells Vathek that he had once been a great king, but was seduced by a Jinn and received the power to make everyone in the world do his bidding. But because of this, Soliman is destined to suffer in hell for a finite but vast period. The other inmates must suffer the fire in their hearts for all eternity. Vathek requests the giaour to release him, saying he will relinquish all he was offered, but the giaour refuses. He tells Vathek to enjoy his omnipotence while it lasts, for in a few days he will be tormented.

Vathek and Nouronihar become increasingly discontented with the palace of flames. Vathek orders an ifrit to fetch Carathis from the castle. While the ifrit is bringing Carathis, Vathek meets some people who are, like him, awaiting the execution of their sentences of eternal suffering. Three relate to Vathek how they got to Iblis' domain. (Note: These narratives were, until restored to their intended place in the novel, in the 1971 Ballantine edition, lost until 1909, discovered by Lewis Melville. They were then published in a separate book in 1912.) When Carathis arrives, he warns her of what happens to those who enter Iblis' domain, but Carathis takes the talismans of earthly power from Soliman regardless. She gathers the Jinns and tries to overthrow one of the Solimans, but Iblis decrees "It is time." Carathis, Vathek, Nouronihar, and the other denizens of hell lose "the most precious gift granted by heaven – HOPE". They all sink into a state of complete apathy, and an eternal fire begins to burn within them.

== Characters ==
Vathek
Ninth Caliph of the Abassides, who ascended to the throne at an early age. His figure was pleasing and majestic, but when angry, his eyes became so terrible that "the wretch on whom it was fixed instantly fell backwards and sometimes expired" (1). He was addicted to women and pleasures of the flesh, so he ordered five palaces to be built: the five palaces of the senses. Although he was an eccentric man, he was learned in the ways of science, physics, and astrology. His chief sin, gluttony, paved the path of his damnation.

Giaour
His name means blasphemer and infidel. He claims to be an Indian merchant, but in actuality he is a Jinn who works for the arch-demon Eblis. He guides Vathek and gives him instructions on how to reach the palace of fire.

Carathis
Vathek's mother. She is a Greek woman who is well versed in science, astrology, and occult magic. She teaches all of her skills to Vathek, and convinces him to embark on his quest for power which eventually leads to his damnation. When arriving in hell, Carathis runs amok, exploring the palace, discovering its hidden secrets, and even tries to stage a rebellion. However, once her own punishment is enacted, she too loses all hope and is consumed by her guilt.

Emir Fakreddin
Vathek's host during his travels. He offers Vathek a place to stay and rest. He is deeply religious. Vathek betrays his hospitality by seducing his daughter.

Nouronihar
The Emir's daughter, a beautiful girl who is promised to Gulchenrouz, but is seduced by Vathek and joins him in his road to damnation.

Gulchenrouz
A beautiful young man with feminine features. He is the Emir's nephew. Due to his innocence, he is rescued from Carathis's hands and is allowed to live in eternal youth in a palace above the clouds.

Bababalouk
Head of Vathek's eunuchs. He is cunning and acts as a steward on Vathek's journey.

Morakanabad
Vathek's loyal and unsuspecting vizier.

Sutlememe
The Emir's head eunuch who serves as a caretaker for Nouronihar and Gulchenrouz.

Dilara
Vathek's favourite wife.

== Terms used from history and mythology, as named in the work ==
- Afrit – described as a creature comparable to the Lamia and Medusa, depicted as the cruelest type of demon (div) in Vathek.
- Balkis (Balkis in Vathek) (Hebrew: מלכת שבא, Malkat Shva; Ge'ez: ንግሥተ ሳባ, Nigist Saba; (ማክዳ mākidā); Arabic: ملكة سبأ, Malikat Sabaʾ – the woman ruler of the ancient kingdom of Sheba referred to in Habeshan history, the Hebrew Bible, the New Testament, and the Qur'an. She is mentioned (unnamed) in the Bible in the Books of Kings and Book of Chronicles as a great queen who seeks out Solomon to learn if the tales of his wisdom are true. She is also mentioned in Jewish legends as a queen with a great love for learning, in African tales as "the queen of Egypt and Ethiopia", and in Muslim tradition as Balkis, a great queen of a nation that worshiped the sun who later converted to Solomon's god. The Roman historian Josephus calls her Nicaule. She is thought to have been born on 5 January, sometime in the 10th century BC. The character was modelled on Iblis or Azazil and from Satan in John Milton's Paradise Lost's Satan (1667 and 1674; see Fallen angel).
- Dive – an evil creature, a demon.
- Eunuch – an emasculated man; the term usually refers to those emasculated to perform a specific social function.
- Khalif (Caliph in Vathek) (from Arabic: خلافة khilāfa) – the head of state in a caliphate, and the title for the leader of the Islamic Ummah, or global Islamic nation. It is a transliterated version of the Arabic word خليفة Khalīfah which means "successor" or "representative". The early leaders of the Muslim nation following Muhammad's (570–632) death were called "Khalifat ar-rasul Allah", meaning political successor.
- Fortress of Aherman – a reference to the religious figure.
- Jinn – according to Middle Eastern mythology, they governed the Earth before humans. They are formed of subtler matter than humans and likewise capable of salvation.
- Layla and Majnun – famous lovers in Middle Eastern legends.
- Eblis (Arabic: إبليس) – lord of the apostate angels, who were cast into the underworld after refusing to bow before Adam.
- Mount Qaf – a legendary mountain surrounding the Earth.
- Simurgh – a wise and miraculous bird, friendly towards "the sons of Adam" and an enemy to the divs.

=== Setting ===
Architecture is used to illustrate certain elements of Vathek's character and to warn of the dangers of over-reaching. Vathek's hedonism and devotion to pleasure are reflected in the pleasure wings he adds on to his castle, each with the express purpose of satisfying a different sense. He builds a tall tower in order to further his quest for knowledge. This tower stands for Vathek's pride and desire for a power beyond the reach of humans. He is later warned that he must destroy the tower and return to Islam, or risk dire consequences. Vathek's pride wins out, and in the end his quest for power and knowledge ends with him confined to hell.

== Literary significance and criticism ==
Lord Byron cited Vathek as a source for his poem The Giaour. In Childe Harold's Pilgrimage, Byron also calls Vathek "England's wealthiest son". Other Romantic poets wrote works with a Middle Eastern setting inspired by Vathek, including Robert Southey's Thalaba the Destroyer (1801) and Thomas Moore's Lalla-Rookh (1817). John Keats's vision of the Underworld in Endymion (1818) is indebted to the novel.

Edgar Allan Poe mentions the infernal terrace seen by Vathek in "Landor's Cottage". Stéphane Mallarmé, who translated Poe's poems into French, inspired by this reference in "Landor's Cottage", had Vathek reprinted in its original French, for which edition he also supplied a preface. In his book English Prose Style, Herbert Read cited Vathek as "one of the best fantasies in the language".

H. P. Lovecraft also cited Vathek as the inspiration for his unfinished novel Azathoth. Vathek is also believed to have been a model for Lovecraft's completed novel The Dream-Quest of Unknown Kadath.

American fantasy author Clark Ashton Smith greatly admired Vathek. Smith later wrote "The Third Episode of Vathek", the completion of a fragment by Beckford that was entitled "The Story of the Princess Zulkaïs and the Prince Kalilah". "The Third Episode of Vathek" was published in R. H. Barlow's fanzine Leaves in 1937, and later in Smith's 1960 collection The Abominations of Yondo.

Vathek has been well received by historians of the fantasy genre; Les Daniels stated Vathek was "a unique and delightful book". Daniels argued Vathek had little in common with the other "Gothic" novels; "Beckford's luxuriant imagery and sly humour create a mood totally antithetical to that suggested by the grey castles and black deeds of medieval Europe". Franz Rottensteiner calls the novel "a marvellous story, the creation of an erratic but powerful imagination, which brilliantly evokes the mystery and wonder associated with the Orient" and Brian Stableford has praised the work as the "classic novel Vathek—a feverish and gleefully perverse decadent/Arabian fantasy".

== Adaptations ==
George Yeilding MacMahon published his dramatic adaptation of Vathek in 1859.

== Major allusions to Vathek ==
- Vathek, a symphonic poem written in 1913, composed by Luís de Freitas Branco, was inspired by this novel.
- Another symphonic poem by the same title came from Horatio Parker in 1903.
- The Spanish musician Luis Delgado has published an album called Vathek (1982), inspired by the literary work.

== Sources ==
- Beckford, William, Vathek: The English Translation by Samuel Henley (1786) and the French Editions of Lausanne and Paris (1787, postdated), 1972, Facsimile ed., 3 vols. in 1, Scholars' Facsimiles & Reprints, ISBN 978-0-8201-1102-5.
- Salah S. Ali: Vathek as a Translation of a Lost Tale from the Arabian Nights.
- Laurent Châtel, Utopies paysagères: vues et visions dans les écrits et dans les jardins de William Beckford (1760–1844), Université Paris III–Sorbonne Nouvelle (2000), 769 p. 2 vols.
- Laurent Châtel, "Les sources des contes orientaux de William Beckford" ("Vathek et la 'Suite des contes arabes' "), Epistémé (2005): article online:
- Laurent Châtel, William Beckford – The Elusive Orientalist (Oxford: The Oxford University Studies in the Enlightenment, 2016). ISSN 0435-2866 : William Beckford
- William Thomas Beckford (1887). Vathek – via Wikisource.
- Beckford, William, Vathek et ses épisodes, Préface et édition critique – Didier Girard, Paris, J. Corti, 2003 ISBN 978-2714308078
