= Thomas Ignatius Maria Forster =

English astronomer, physician, naturalist and philosopher (1789–1860)

Thomas Ignatius Maria Forster FRAS FLS
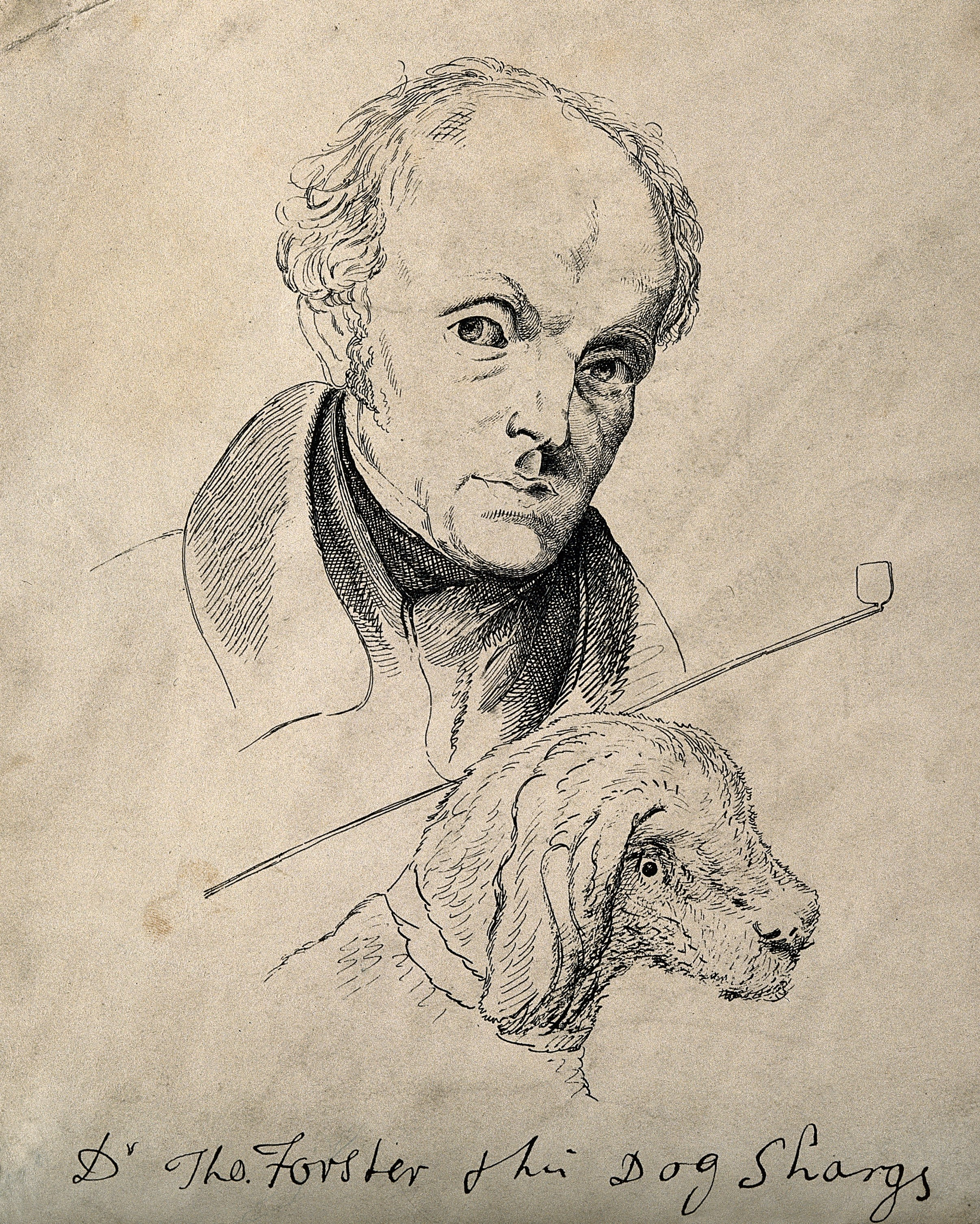
- Etching of Forster with his dog Shargs
- Born: 9 November 1789; Walthamstow, London, England
- Died: 2 February 1860 (aged 70); Brussels, Belgium
- Education: Corpus Christi College, Cambridge
- Occupations: Astronomer; physician; naturalist; philosopher
- Spouse: Julia Beaufoy (m. 1817)
- Children: 1
- Father: Thomas Furly Forster
- Relatives: Benjamin Meggot Forster (uncle); Edward Forster the Younger (uncle); Susanna Dorothy (aunt); Edward Forster the Elder (grandfather); Benjamin Forster (great-uncle)

Thomas Ignatius Maria Forster FRAS FLS (9 November 1789 – 2 February 1860) was an English astronomer, physician, naturalist and philosopher. An early animal rights activist, he promoted vegetarianism and founded the Animals' Friend Society with Lewis Gompertz. He published pamphlets on a wide variety of subjects, including morality, Pythagorean philosophy, bird migration, Sati, and "phrenology", a term that he coined in 1815.

== Life ==
Forster was born in London, on 9 November 1789, the eldest son of Thomas Furly Forster of Walthamstow, who was a botanist, and follower of Jean-Jacques Rousseau. He did not have the conventional classical literary education, but learned some science from his uncle Benjamin Meggot Forster. The Great Comet of 1811 aroused his interest in astronomy, a science which he continued to pursue, and eight years later, on 3 July 1819, he himself discovered a new comet. He declined a fellowship to the Royal Society in 1816 as he disliked some of the rules. He matriculated at Corpus Christi College, Cambridge, in order to study law, but soon abandoned it to study medicine, taking his degree in 1819. Two years before, he had married Julia, daughter of Colonel Mark Beaufoy, and taken up residence at Spa Lodge, Tunbridge Wells. After the birth of his only daughter he moved to Hartwell in Sussex, and then spent three years abroad. During the 1820s, he converted to Roman Catholicism.

After his return to England he became a fellow of the Royal Astronomical Society and helped to found a meteorological society along with Sir Richard Phillips, which had only a brief existence.

After his father's death in 1825, he took up his residence in Chelmsford in order to be near his daughter, then a pupil at Newhall Convent. Here he undertook a series of researches on the influence of atmospheric conditions on diseases, and particularly on cholera which also involved a balloon ascent in April 1831. In 1833 he again went abroad, where he spent most of his remaining years, settling finally in Bruges, Belgium. He continued writing during the latter part of his life, including poetry. He also composed selections for the violin. He numbered among his friends authors and scholars of his time, such as Thomas Gray, Richard Porson, Percy Bysshe Shelley, Thomas Love Peacock, William Herschel, and William Whewell. He became a vegetarian, following a Pythagorean diet, and along with Lewis Gompertz, founded the Animals' Friend Society in 1833.

Forster lived in Bruges from 1842 to 1852. He then moved to Brussels, where he died on 2 February 1860.

== Works ==
In 1805 Forster had compiled a "Journal of the Weather" and had published his Liber Rerum Naturalium. In 1806, inspired by Gall's works, he took up the study of phrenology. Later he met Johann Spurzheim, and studied with him the anatomy and physiology of the brain. Forster accompanied Spurzheim to Edinburgh, where he communicated a paper on the comparative anatomy of the brain to the Wernerian Society. On his return to London he published a sketch of Gall and Spurzheim's system, which, like many of his writings, appeared in the Pamphleteer, together with an essay on the application of the organology of the brain to education. He coined the term "Phrenology" in 1815.

Forster was influenced by John Abernethy under whom he studied surgery. Abernethy believed in diet as being key to health. In 1813, Forster published his Physiological Reflections on the Destructive Operation of Spiritous and Fermented Liquors on the Animal System where he traced his vegetarianism to Italian renaissance writing, Pythagorean ideas on the transmigration of the soul, cruelty to animals, and Hindu practices. He also influenced Shelley's conversion to vegetarianism.

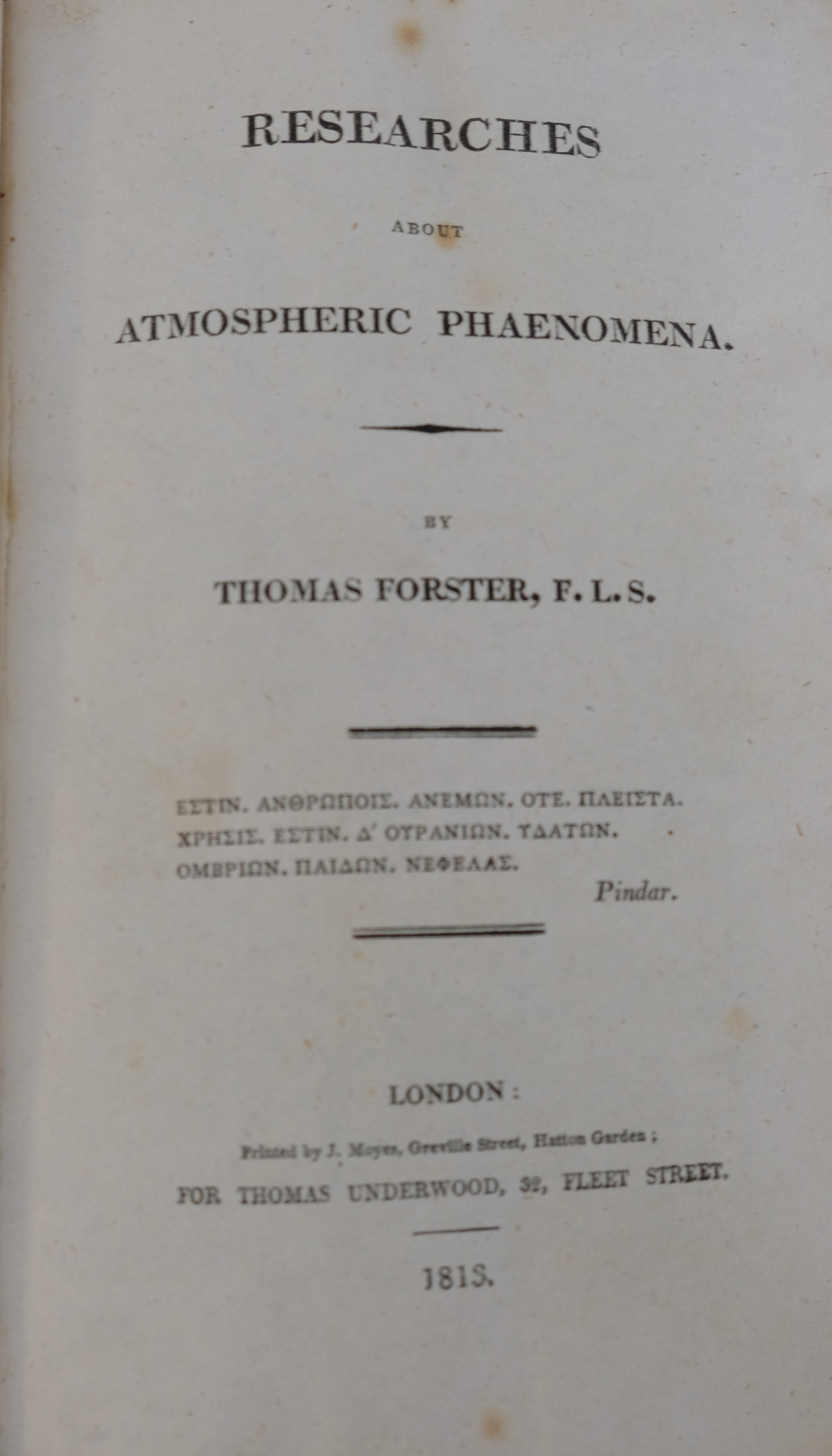
Title page of a 1813 copy of Forster's "Researches about atmospheric phaenomena"

Forster's observations and studies in Continental Europe led to the publication, in 1824, of his "Perennial Calendar". In 1830 he collected and published the letters of John Locke, Shaftesbury, and Algernon Sydney which he inherited from Benjamin Furly.

Other publications included:

- Researches About Atmospheric Phaenomena (London, 1813; 2nd ed., 1815)
- Reflections on the Destructive Operation of Spirituous Liquors (London, 1812)
- Somatopsychonoologia (1823) written under the pen-name Philostratus
- The Perennial Calendar, and Companion to the Almanack (1824)
- Pocket Encyclopedia of Natural Phenomena (from his father's MSS., 1826)
- Medicina Simplex (1832)
- Beobachtungen uber den Einfluss des Luftdruckes auf das Gehor (Frankfurt, 1835)
- Observations sur l'influence des Cometes (1836)
- Philozoia, or Moral Reflections on the actual condition of the Animal Kingdom, and the means of improving the same (Brussels, 1839)
- Pan, a Pastoral (Brussels, 1840)
- Essay on Abnormal Affections of the Organs of Sense (Tunbridge Wells, 1841)
- Sati or Universal Immortality (1843) [in which he wrote favourably on sati, considering it consistent with Christianity]
- Annales d'un Physicien Voyageur (Bruges, 1848)
- Numerous articles in The Gentleman's Magazine
- A Synoptical Catalogue of British Birds: Intended to Identify the Species Mentioned by Different Names in Several Catalogues Already Extant. Forming a Book of Reference to Observations on British Ornithology (printed by and for Nichols, son, and Bentley, 1817)
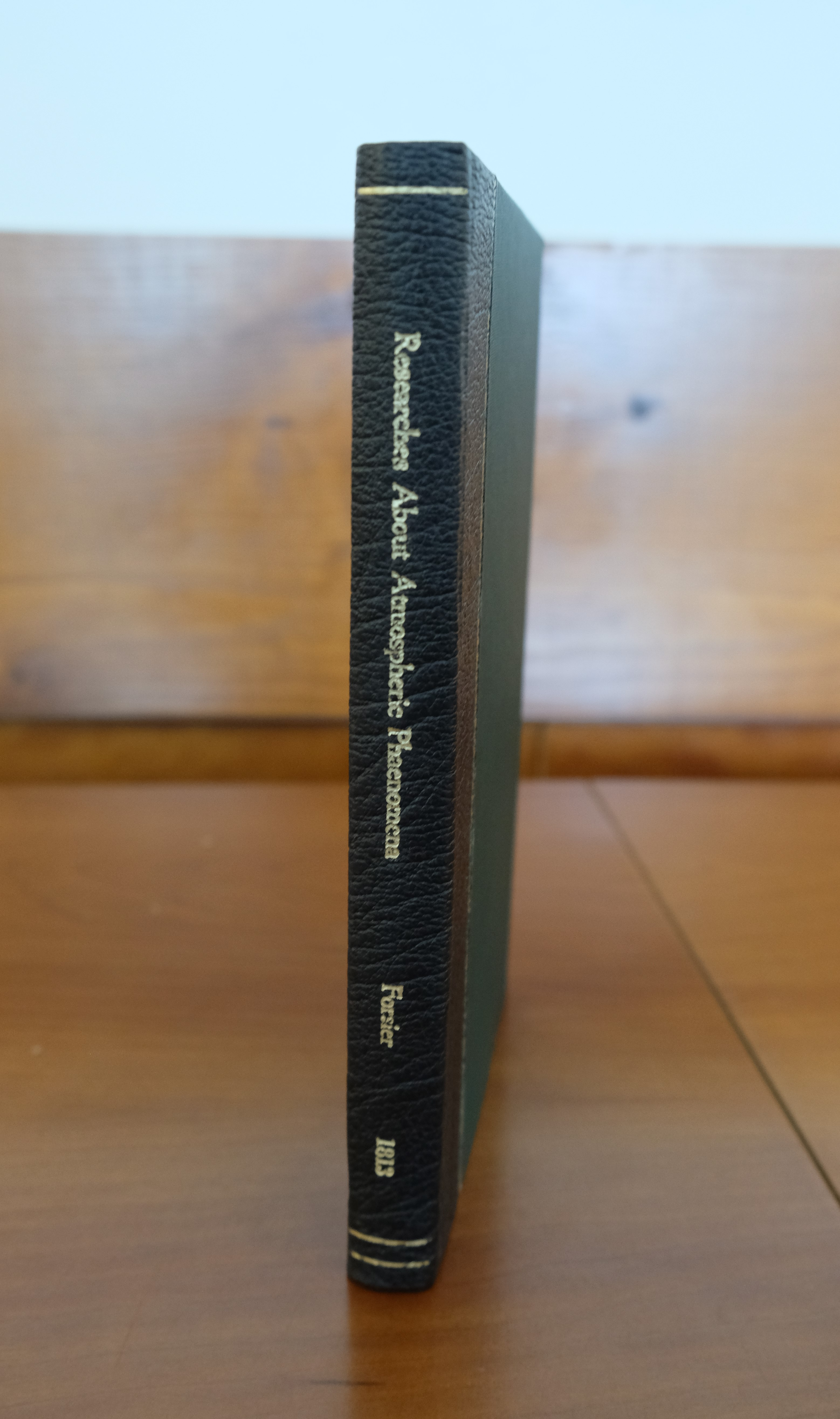
1813 copy of Forster's "Researches about atmospheric phaenomena"

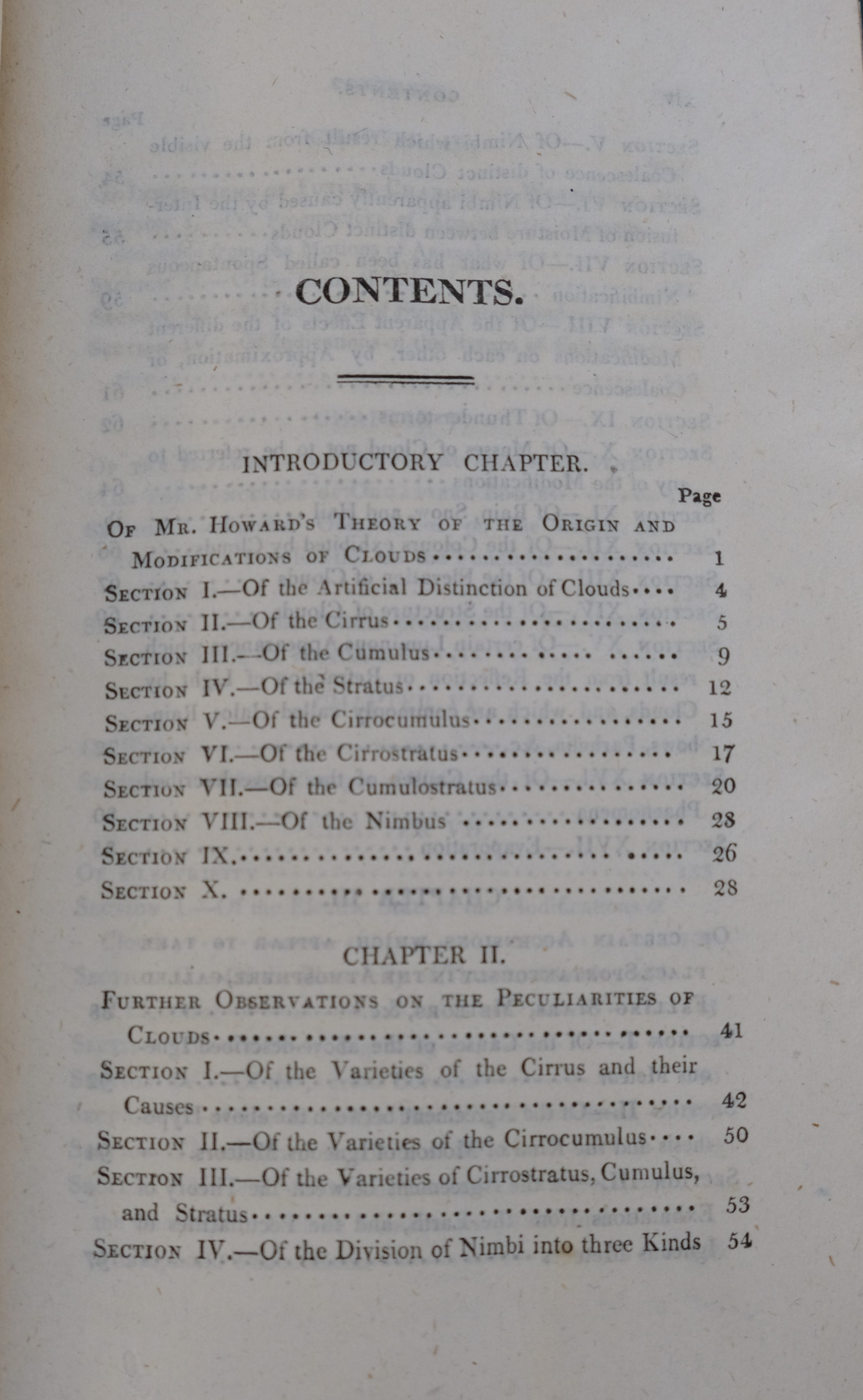
Table of contents for "Researches about atmospheric phaenomena"

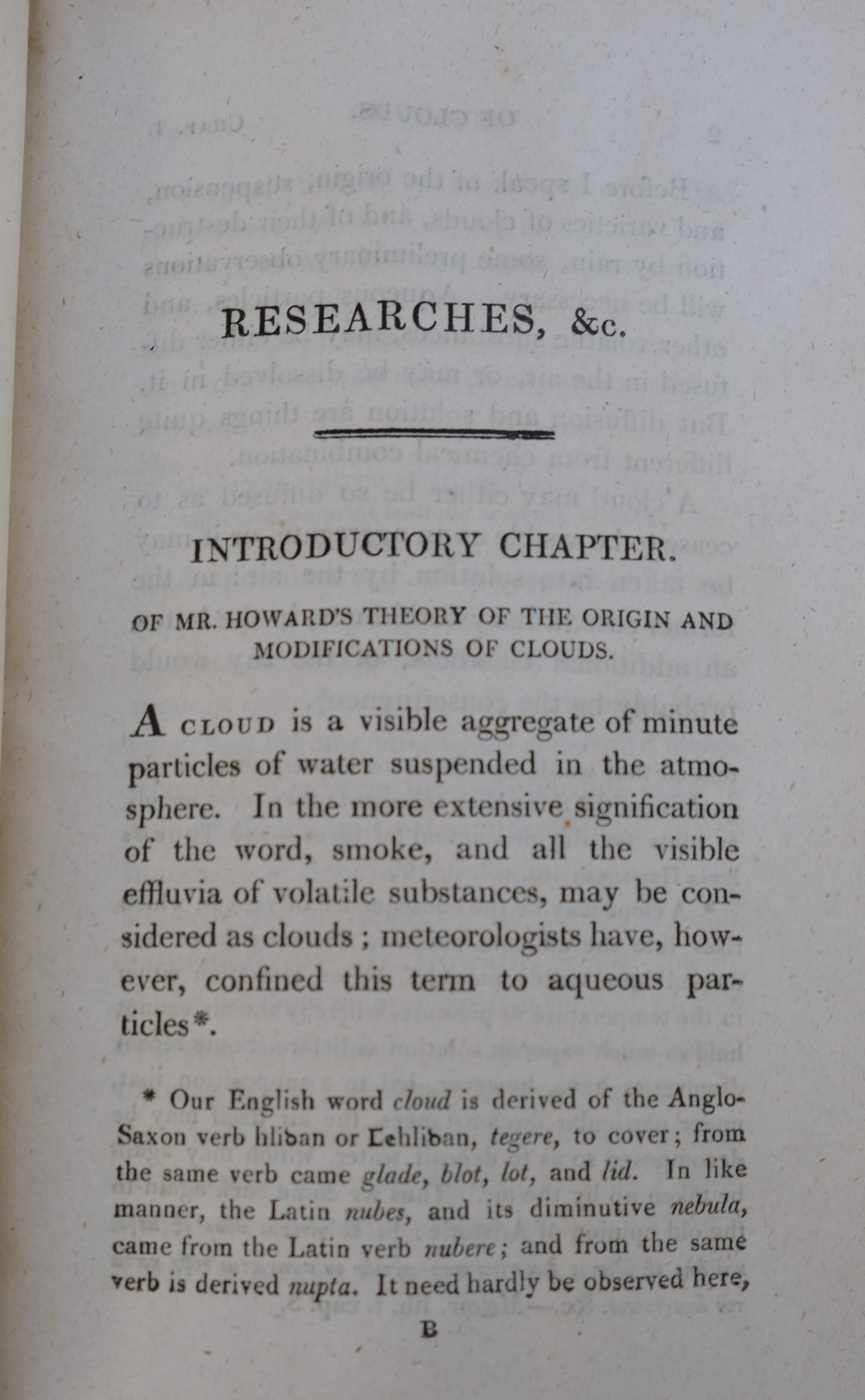
First page of "Researches about atmospheric phaenomena"
