= Michael Tyson (antiquary) =

English Anglican priest, academic, antiquary and artist

Michael Tyson (1740–1780) was an English Anglican priest, academic, antiquary, and artist.

== Life ==
He was born in Stamford, Lincolnshire on 19 November 1740, the only child of Michael Tyson (d. 22 February 1794, aged 83), dean of Stamford and archdeacon of Huntingdon, by his first wife, Elizabeth Curtis of Woolsthorpe, Lincolnshire. He entered Corpus Christi College, Cambridge in 1759, became a scholar, and studied Greek under the Rev. John Cowper, brother of William Cowper, the poet. He graduated B.A. (11th Wrangler) in 1764, M.A. in 1767, and B.D. in 1775, and in 1767 was elected to a fellowship at his college.

In the autumn of 1766 Tyson accompanied Richard Gough in a tour, of which he kept a journal, through the north of England and Scotland; during the journey he was made a burgess of Glasgow (12 September 1766) and of Inverary (17 September) He returned to residence at college, and devoted himself to etching and botany. With Israel Lyons the younger he made trips in search of rare plants around Cambridge.

Tyson was elected Fellow of the Society of Antiquaries of London on 2 June 1768, and Fellow of the Royal Society on 11 February 1779. On 17 March 1769 he made himself conspicuous at Cambridge by voting with John Jebb in a minority of two against the Tory address to George III.

Tyson was ordained deacon by John Green at Whitehall chapel on 11 March 1770, and until 1772 was minister of Sawston, Cambridgeshire. For a time he was dean of his college, and he was bursar about 1774 when he succeeded to the cure of St Bene't's Church in Cambridge. In 1776 Tyson became Whitehall preacher. In the same year he and the Rev. Thomas Kerrich made a catalogue of the prints in the university library at Cambridge.

In March 1778 Tyson was inducted, after a long legal dispute, to the rectory of Lambourne near Ongar in Essex. He died at Lambourne on 4 May 1780 from a fever, which carried him off within a week, and was buried on 10 May outside the communion rails. Tyson's library was sold by Leigh & Sotheby in 1781.

== Works ==
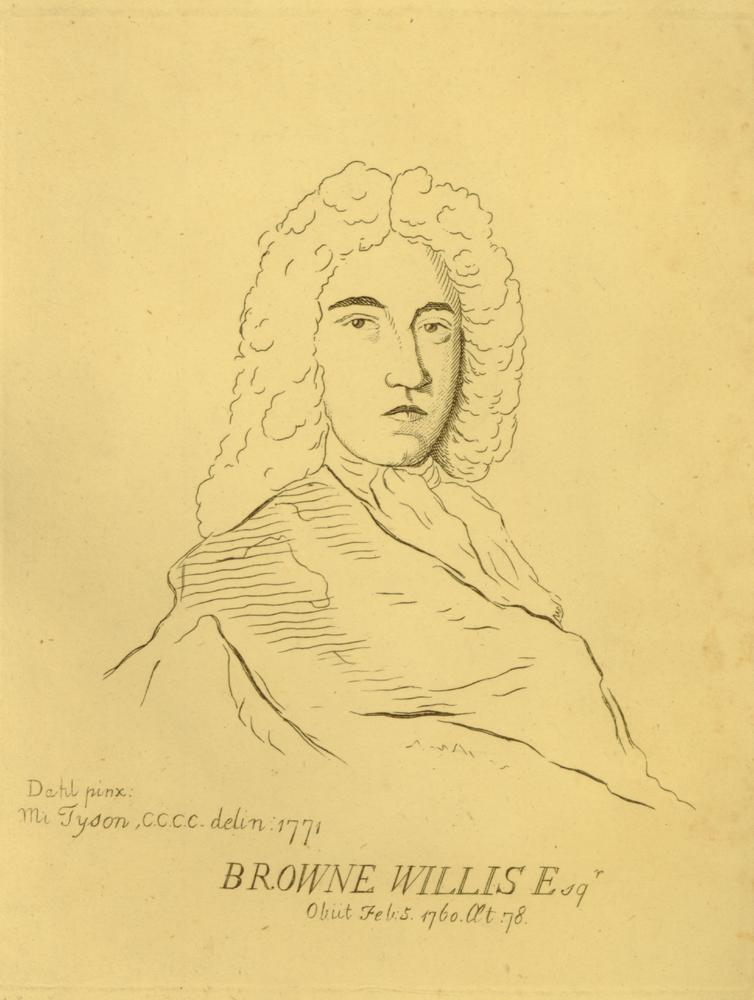
Etching of Browne Willis (1771) after a portrait by Michael Dahl

Tyson executed engravings, etchings, and miniatures for private circulation; some of them were put on public sale. He made etchings of Cambridgeshire churches and tombs, and of the portraits of the masters of his college. One of Jacob Butler, proprietor of the Barnwell estate, is in the Bibliotheca Topographica Britannica, vol. v., and his drawing of Browne Willis is in John Nichols's Literary Anecdotes (viii. 219). He etched and dedicated to William Cole a portrait of Michael Dalton. Several of his drawings are in the Antiquarian Repertory.

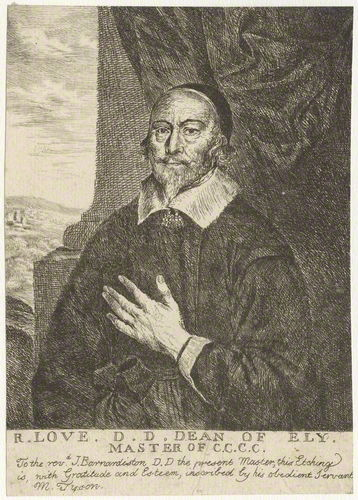
Engraving of Richard Love

An account by Tyson of a fish brought by Commodore John Byron from the Pacific appeared in the Philosophical Transactions of 1771; and he wrote English verses in the university collections on the accession of George III (1760), his marriage (1761), the birth of the Prince of Wales (1762), and on the peace (1763). He contemplated a work on Queen Elizabeth's progresses, but it was carried out by John Nichols, who received information from Tyson. A description of an illuminated manuscript at Corpus Christi College, with plates by him, was printed as his paper in Archæologia (ii. 194–7), and reprinted at Cambridge in 1770 as his work; but the authorship was also claimed by Cole.

Tyson was one of a group at Corpus Christi called the "Benedictines" (Corpus had been known as Benet College), that included Robert Masters and James Nasmith as well as Cole (not at Corpus) and Gough. He was also friendly with James Essex, Horace Walpole, Sir John Cullum, 6th Baronet, and Samuel Henley. Letters to and from him are in Nichols's Illustrations of Literature. Gough paid tributes to his memory in Sepulchral Monuments (which has some of Tyson's drawings), and in his edition of William Camden's Britannia. Gough, however, in some verses on his friend, calls him 'idlest of men on old Camus banks.'

Tyson was acquainted with the circle around Thomas Gray; he account of Gray's knowledge of natural history in William Mason's life of the poet was by Tyson, who met Charles Victor de Bonstetten also. He made the etching of the caricature by Mason of Rev. Henry Etough under which Gray wrote a derogatory epigram.

== Family ==
On 4 July 1778 he was married at St Bene't's Church, Cambridge, to Margaret, daughter of Hitch Wale of Shelford in Cambridgeshire. He left one son, Michael Curtis Tyson (1779–1794), who inherited Elizabeth Curtis' manors of Barholm and Stow-cum-Deeping in Lincolnshire. His widow married, as her second husband, in the autumn of 1784, Isaac Crouch, assistant clerk of the minutes of the custom-house.
