= Richard Gough (antiquarian) =

English antiquarian

Richard Gough FSA FRS (21 October 1735 – 20 February 1809) was an English antiquarian. He served as director of the Society of Antiquaries of London from 1771 to 1791; published a major work on English church monuments; and translated and edited a new edition of William Camden's Britannia.

He is not to be confused with the Richard Gough who wrote a "History of Myddle", Shropshire, in 1700.

== Life ==
Gough was born in London, where his father, Harry Gough, was a prosperous director of the British East India Company and also a member of parliament. In 1751 he entered Corpus Christi College, Cambridge, where he began his work on British topography, eventually published in 1768. Leaving Cambridge in 1756, without a degree, he began a series of antiquarian excursions in various parts of Great Britain.

Gough was elected a Fellow of the Society of Antiquaries of London in 1767, and was its director from 1771 to 1791. As director, he urged the Society to increase the scope of its publications, especially as a means of recording England's Gothic architecture; as the intermittent series Vetusta Monumenta was the only record of its research. He was elected a Fellow of the Royal Society in 1775. His books and manuscripts relating to Anglo-Saxon and northern literature, all his collections in the department of British topography, and a large number of his drawings and engravings of other archaeological remains, were bequeathed to the University of Oxford. One notable item in the bequest is the so-called Gough Map, an outstanding medieval map of Britain, which is now known by Gough's name.

== Works ==
Gough was a precocious child, and at twelve had translated from the French a history of the Bible, which his mother printed for private circulation. Aged fifteen he translated Abbé Claude Fleury's work on the Israelites; and at sixteen he published an elaborate work entitled Atlas Renovatus, or Geography modernised. In 1773 he began an edition in English of William Camden's Britannia: this was published in 1789, with a second edition appearing in 1806.

Meantime he published, in 1786, the first volume of his work the Sepulchral Monuments in Great Britain, applied to illustrate the history of families, manners, habits and arts at the different periods from the Norman Conquest to the Seventeenth Century. This volume, which contained the first four centuries, was followed in 1796 by a second volume containing the 15th century, and an introduction to the second volume appeared in 1799.

Among Gough's minor works are An Account of the Bedford Missal (in manuscript); A Catalogue of the Coins of Canute, King of Denmark (1777); History of Pleshey in Essex (1803); An Account of the Coins of the Seleucidae, Kings of Syria (1804); and "History of the Society of Antiquaries of London," prefixed to their Archaeologia.
