= Bairbre Dowling =

Irish actress (1953–2016)

- Born: Barbara Patricia Dowling; 27 March 1953; Dublin, Ireland
- Died: 20 January 2016 (aged 62); New York City, US
- Occupation: Actress
- Notable work: Cry of the Innocent (1963); The Dead (1987); War of the Buttons (1994)
- Spouse: Colm Meaney (m. 1977; div. 1994)
- Children: Brenda Meaney
- Parents: Vincent Dowling (father); Brenda Doyle (mother)
- Relatives: Richard Boyd Barrett (half-brother)

Bairbre Patricia Dowling (/barˈba.ra/; Irish: Bairbre Ní Dúnlaing; 27 March 1953 – 20 January 2016) was an Irish actress of screen and stage. She began her career as a child actor in Francis Ford Coppola's first feature, Dementia 13 (1963). She would go on to appear in multiple films, including John Huston's final feature, The Dead (1987), based on the James Joyce novella of the same name.

On television, Dowling was best known for her role as Josie Tracy on the long-running RTÉ drama serial The Riordans, which aired from 1965-1979. In 1983, she starred as Margaret Flaherty in the Emmy Award winning television film adaptation of J. M. Synge's The Playboy of the Western World for PBS. Her other television credits included guest spots on 1st & Ten, Scarlett, Murder, She Wrote, ER, Star Trek: Voyager, Crossing Jordan, and Days of Our Lives.

A veteran of the stage, Dowling began performing at the National Theatre of Ireland in the 1970s. In 1979, she made her Broadway debut as Mary Tate in Hugh Leonard's Tony Award winning play Da and would go on to appear in over 70 professional stage and radio plays.

== Early life ==
Dowling was born in Dublin, the eldest daughter of actors Vincent Dowling and Brenda Doyle. She had three younger sisters, Louise, Valerie and Rachael, who is also an actress. The family lived on Shanowen Road in Santry, County Dublin. Her parents had a relatively progressive marriage, allowing for both to partake in a series of extramarital affairs. One such affair produced her sister Valerie. Although aware of this, Vincent always functioned as the girl’s father. However, their marriage eventually dissolved in 1967 over Vincent’s relationship with a much younger Abbey actress, Sinéad Cusack, daughter of the renowned actor Cyril Cusack. Dowling's affair with Cusack produced a son, Richard Boyd Barrett, who was put up for adoption. Barrett’s paternity was not revealed until after Vincent’s death in 2013.

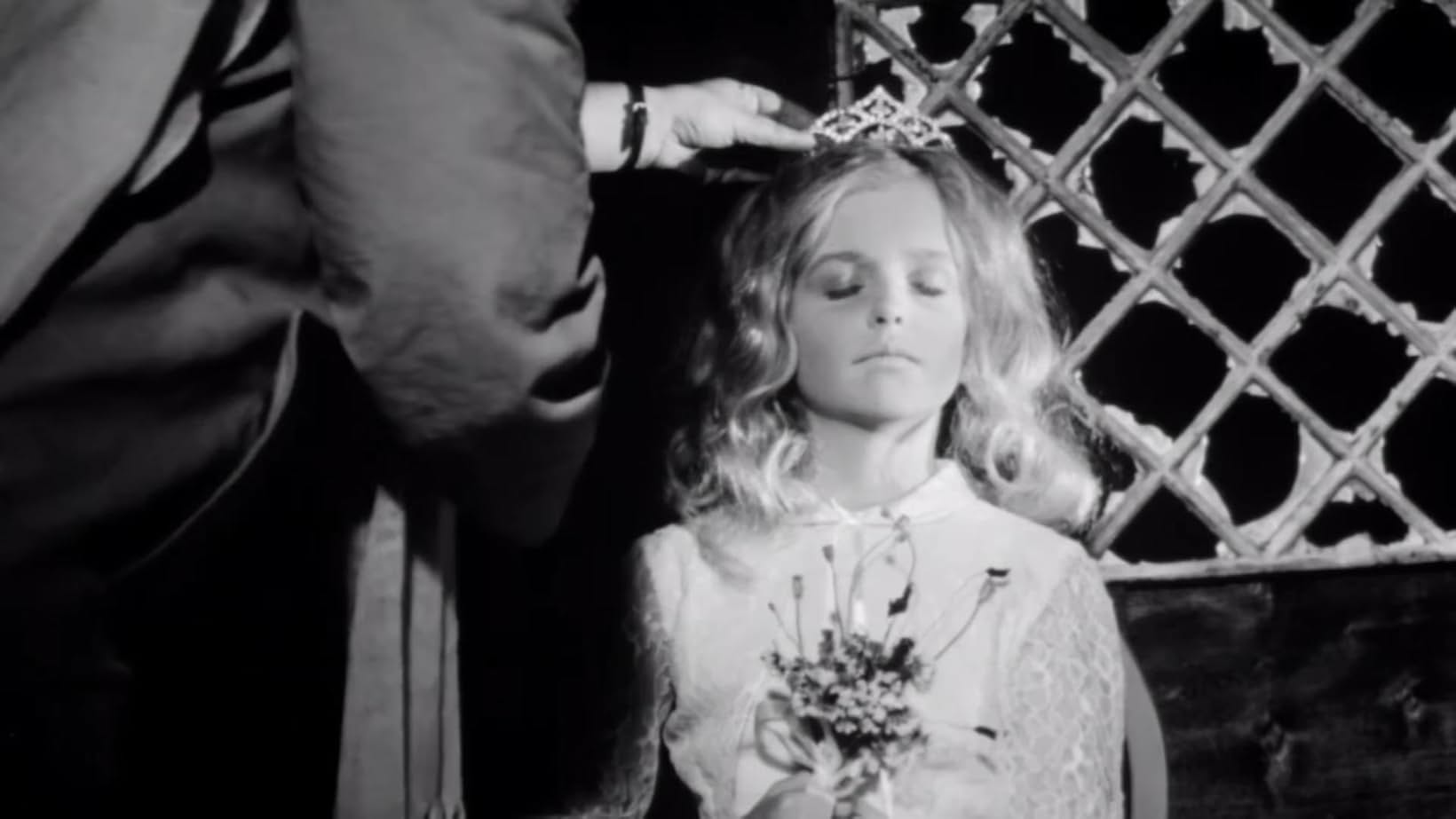
Dowling as Kathleen Haloran in Francis Ford Coppola's Dementia 13 (1963)

Dowling formally trained as a dancer, but began acting as a child. She made her screen debut in 1963 as Kathleen Haloran in Academy Award winning filmmaker Francis Ford Coppola's first feature film, Dementia 13. The film tells the story of Louise Haloran (Luana Anders), a scheming widow who upon murdering her husband John (Peter Read), fears she will be disinherited. Fabricating a story about John's absence, she joins the rest of the Haloran family at their estate in Ireland as they hold a memorial for John's younger sister Kathleen (Dowling). Louise plots to convince Lady Haloran (Eithne Dunne) that she can speak with the deceased child. However, her plans are interrupted by the sudden appearance of the girls' ghost, and an axe-wielding murderer.

== Career ==
=== Stage ===
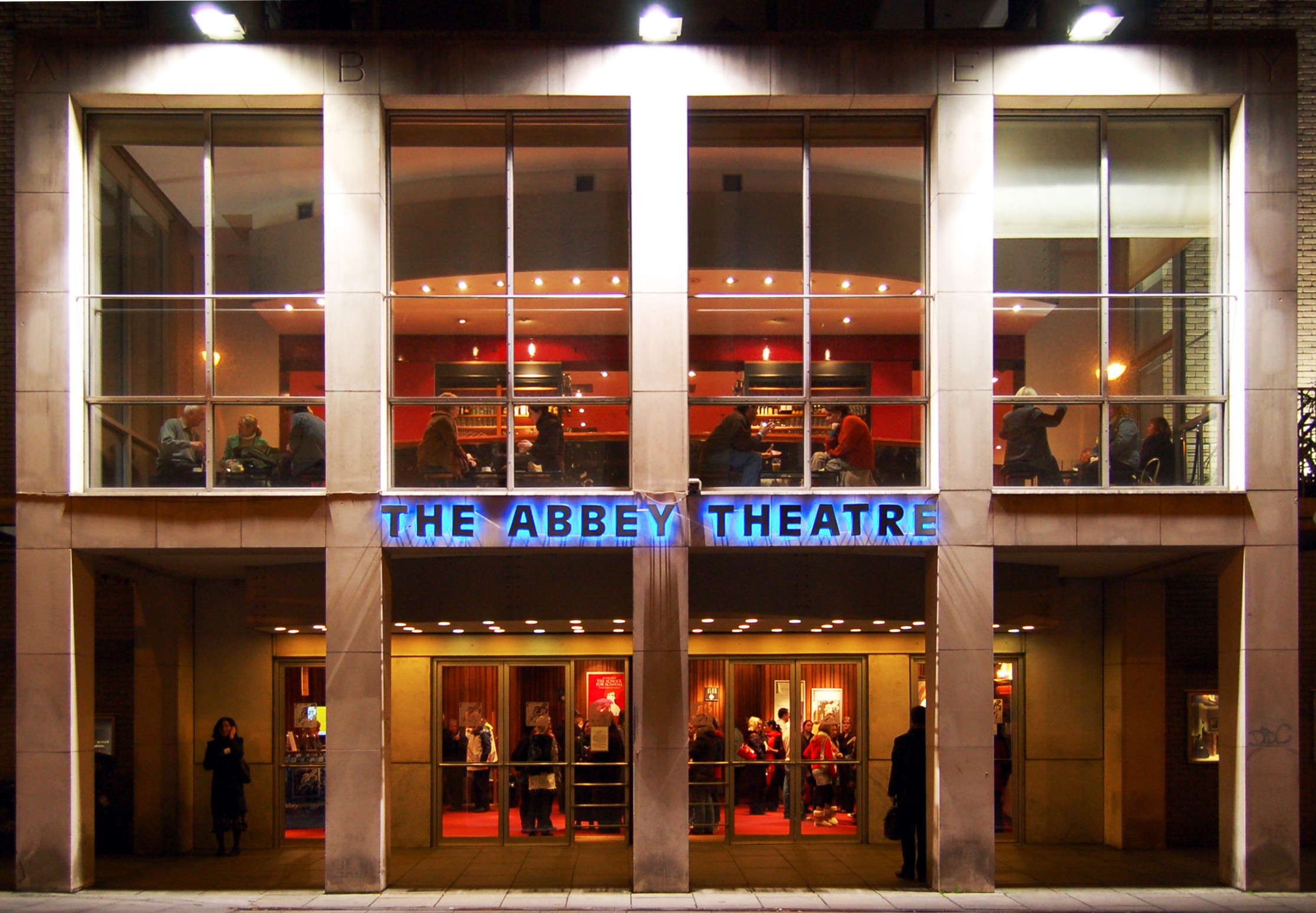
Dowling started her career acting in numerous productions with the Abbey Theatre from 1971–1980.

In 1970, Dowling joined the company at the Abbey Theatre, where she appeared in Wesley Burrowes’ The Becauseway (1970), Tom Murphy’s On the Outside, and Maureen Duffy’s and Rites (1973). She married fellow actor Colm Meaney in 1977, and together they emigrated to the United States to work with her father, Vincent Dowling at the Great Lakes Shakespeare Festival. Later that year, Dowling made her American stage debut as Ophelia in William Shakespeare’s Hamlet. Later that season she appeared as the titular Margaret "Peg" O'Connell in J. Hartley Manners’ Peg o’ My Heart, and Laura Wingfield in Tennessee Williams’ The Glass Menagerie. Dowling would continue to appear in the theatre's main company for the next seven years. Credits from this period included Maggie Wylie in J. M. Barrie’s What Every Woman Knows (1978); Blanche of Castile in Shakespeare’s King John (1978), Lavinia in Titus Andronicus (1980), and Beatrice in Much Ado About Nothing (1981); Margaret Flaherty in John Millington Synge’s The Playboy of the Western World (1982), Mum in Jeremy Brooks and Adrian Mitchell's stage adaptation of Dylan Thomas’ A Child's Christmas in Wales 1983), and Helen in C. P. Taylor’s And a Nightingale Sang (1985). Perhaps most notably from her time at the Great Lakes Shakespeare Festival, Dowling and Meaney shared the stage in the American premiere of The Life and Adventures of Nicholas Nickleby in 1982. The play is an 8½ hour-long adaptation of Charles Dickens’ 1839 novel of the same name, performed in two parts. Part 1 was 4 hours in length with one interval of 15 minutes. Part 2 was 4½ hours in length with two intervals of 12 minutes. It was originally presented onstage over two evenings, or in its entirety from early afternoon with a dinner break. The production was a critical and commercial success, later transferring to Merle Reskin Theatre in Chicago, Illinois.

During her tenure at Great Lakes, Dowling was cast as a replacement in the original Broadway run of Hugh Leonard's Tony Award winning play Da at the Morosco Theatre (1979). The following year she appeared as Miranda in William Shakespeare's The Tempest at the Asolo Repertory Theatre in Sarasota, Florida (1980). The production was included in the Burns Mantle Yearbook of Best American Plays, 1979-1980.

In 1985, Dowling and Meaney relocated to Los Angeles, California, where she would continue to work regularly on stage. In 1990, she appeared as Marion in David Hare's The Secret Rapture at South Coast Repertory. The following year she played Lady Macbeth in the Odyssey Theatre Ensemble's production of William Shakespeare's Macbeth in downtown Los Angeles. In 1993, she appeared as Penelope, Calypso, and Athena, in Oliver Taplin's ambitious stage adaptation of Homer's The Odyssey at The J. Paul Getty Museum, produced by Mark Taper Forum. Later that year, she reunited with her father to appear in Mitch Giannunzio's Last Tag at the newly formed Chester Theatre Company, now a premiere theatre in the Berkshires. Dowling returned to Chester Theatre Company the following summer to appear as the titular Fanny Kemble in Anne Ludlum's An Audience With Fanny Kemble. Later that year, she appeared as Maggie in Brian Friel's Dancing at Lughnasa at Studio Arena Theater in Buffalo, New York.

In 2000, Dowling appeared as Miss Pope in David Grimm's Sheridan, or Schooled in Scandal at La Jolla Playhouse. Then in 2002, she starred as Geraldine in Bernard Farrell's Stella by Starlight at Laguna Playhouse. In 2004, she returned to Chester Theatre Company to star in the American premiere of Isobel Mahon's So Long, Sleeping Beauty. She would return the following year to appear as Esther Franz in Arthur Miller's The Price. In 2007, she would return to Chester Theatre Company again to star in a double-bill of Jerome Kilty's Dear Liar and Bruce E. Rodgers' the Gravity of Honey. In 2009, she relocated to New York City, appearing Off-Broadway as Annie Twohig in Lennox Robinson's Is Life Worth Living? at the Mint Theater Company. She would return to the Mint in 2011 to appear as Maggie Cooney in Teresa Deevy's Temporal Powers. The production was named a "Critic's Pick" by The New York Times. In 2013, she appeared as Marthy Owen in a site-specific production of Eugene O'Neill's Anna Christie at the Waterfront Museum's Lehigh Valley Barge No. 79, produced by Spleen Theatre. The following year, she appeared as Aunt Queenie in John Van Druten's Bell, Book and Candle at The Gene Frankel Theatre. Later that year, Dowling would make her final stage appearance in an adaptation of Flann O'Brien's The Third Policeman at La Mama Experimental Theatre Club.

=== Film, television and radio ===
Dowling first rose to prominence for her long-running turn as Josie Tracy on the RTÉ drama serial The Riordans, which ran from 1965-1979. In 1980, she appeared as Maureen in Michael O'Herlihy's television film Cry of the Innocent for NBC. In 1983, she starred as Margaret Flaherty in a television film adaptation of J. M. Synge's The Playboy of the Western World for PBS, directed by her father Vincent Dowling. In 1987, she had a small role in Rod Holcomb's television film The Long Journey Home for CBS. The film won a Regional Emmy Award. She had guest spots on numerous other television series, including 1st & Ten (1986), Scarlett (1994), Murder, She Wrote (1995), ER (1997), Star Trek: Voyager (2000), Crossing Jordan (2003), and Days of Our Lives (2007).

After previously working as a child actor, Dowling returned to the silver screen as Star in Academy Award nominated filmmaker John Boorman's 1974 science fantasy epic Zardoz. In 1987, she appeared as Miss Higgins in Academy Award winning filmmaker John Huston's final film, The Dead, based on the James Joyce novella of the same name. Her final film appearance came in BAFTA winning filmmaker John Roberts' 1994 drama War of the Buttons, playing Geronimo's Mum opposite her real-life husband, Colm Meaney.

In addition to her work on television and film, Dowling was a prolific voice actress on radio. A longtime ensemble member of the California Artists Radio Theatre (CART), she performed in over 30 live radio play recordings.

== Personal life ==
From 1977 to 1994, Dowling was married to fellow actor Colm Meaney, frequently appearing opposite him on stage and screen. Together they had one daughter, actress Brenda Meaney, born in 1984.

Dowling died from complications of Creutzfeldt–Jakob disease in New York City on 20 January 2016, at the age of 62.

== Acting credits ==
=== Film ===
Year	Title	Role	Notes
1963	Dementia 13	Kathleen Haloran	
1974	Zardoz	Star	
1980	Cry of the Innocent	Maureen	Television Film, NBC
1983	The Playboy of the Western World	Margaret Flaherty	Television Film, PBS
1987	The Long Journey Home	MIA Wife	Television film, CBS
1987	The Dead	Miss Higgins	
1994	War of the Buttons	Geronimo's mum	

=== Television ===
Year	Title	Role	Notes
1965-1979	The Riordans	Josie Tracy	Main Role: Unknown episodes
1986	1st & Ten	Dr. Rose	Episode: "California Freeze Out"
1994	Scarlett	Mrs. Boyle	Episode: "#1.4"
1995	Murder, She Wrote	Kate Dempsey	Episode: "Another Killing in Cork"
1997	ER	Dorgan	Episode: "Make a Wish"
2000	Star Trek: Voyager	Edith	Episode: "Spirit Folk"
2003	'Crossing Jordan	Sister Mary Katherine	Episode: "Family Ties"
2007	Days of Our Lives	Sister Rose	Episode: "#1.10614"

=== Stage ===
Year	Title	Role	Playwright	Venue	Ref.
1970	The Becauseway	Chorus	Wesley Burrowes	Abbey Theatre	
1970	On the Outside	Anne	Tom Murphy	Project Arts Centre	
1970	On the Inside	Margaret	Tom Murphy	Abbey Theatre	
1973	Rites	Girl	Maureen Duffy	Abbey Theatre	
1977	Hamlet	Ophelia	William Shakespeare	Great Lakes Shakespeare Festival	
1977	Peg o' My Heart	Margaret "Peg" O'Connell	J. Hartley Manners	Great Lakes Shakespeare Festival	
1977	The Glass Menagerie	Laura	Tennessee Williams	Great Lakes Shakespeare Festival	
1978	What Every Woman Knows	Maggie Wylie	J. M. Barrie	Great Lakes Shakespeare Festival	
1978	King John	Blanche of Castile	William Shakespeare	Great Lakes Shakespeare Festival	
1979	Da	Mary Tate	Hugh Leonard	Morosco Theatre, Broadway	
1979	Flying Bird	Una	Bill Morrison	Harold Clurman Theater, Off-Broadway	
1980	Titus Andronicus	Lavinia	William Shakespeare	Great Lakes Shakespeare Festival	
1980	The Tempest	Miranda	William Shakespeare	Asolo Repertory Theatre	
1981	Murder in the Cathedral	Chorus	T. S. Eliot	St. Malachy's Theaterspace, Off-Broadway	
1981	Translations	Sarah / Bridget / Maire (u/s)	Brian Friel	Manhattan Theatre Club, Off-Broadway	
1981	Much Ado About Nothing	Beatrice	William Shakespeare	Great Lakes Shakespeare Festival	
1982	The Playboy of the Western World	Margaret Flaherty	John Millington Synge	Great Lakes Shakespeare Festival	
1982	The Life and Adventures of Nicholas Nickleby	Fanny Squeers / Miss Snevellicci / Peg Sliderskew	Charles Dickens & David Edgar	Great Lakes Shakespeare Festival	
1983	The Life and Adventures of Nicholas Nickleby	Fanny Squeers / Miss Snevellicci / Peg Sliderskew	Charles Dickens & David Edgar	Merle Reskin Theatre, Chicago	
1983	A Child's Christmas in Wales	Mum	Dylan Thomas, Jeremy Brooks, & Adrian Mitchell	Great Lakes Shakespeare Festival	
1985	And a Nightingale Sang	Helen	C. P. Taylor	Great Lakes Shakespeare Festival	
1986	Diary of a Hunger Strike	Bernadette Maguire	Peter Sheridan	Los Angeles Theatre Center	
1990	The Secret Rapture	Marion	David Hare	South Coast Repertory	
1991	Macbeth	Lady Macbeth	William Shakespeare	Odyssey Theatre Ensemble	
1992	The Odyssey	Penelope / Calypso / Athena	Homer & Oliver Taplin	Mark Taper Forum	
1992	Last Tag	Woman	Mitch Giannunzio	Chester Theatre Company	
1993	An Audience With Fanny Kemble	Fanny Kemble	Anne Ludlum	Chester Theatre Company	
1993	Dancing at Lughnasa	Maggie	Brian Friel	Studio Arena Theater	
2000	Sheridan, or Schooled in Scandal	Miss Pope	David Grimm	La Jolla Playhouse	
2002	Stella by Starlight	Geraldine	Bernard Farrell	Laguna Playhouse	
2004	So Long, Sleeping Beauty	Glynis	Isobel Mahon	Chester Theatre Company	
2005	The Price	Esther Franz	Arthur Miller	Chester Theatre Company	
2007	Dear Liar	Mrs. Patrick Campbell	Jerome Kilty	Chester Theatre Company	
2007	The Gravity of Honey	Honey Leone	Bruce E. Rodgers	Chester Theatre Company	
2007	The Memory of Water	Mary	Shelagh Stephenson	Ensemble Theatre Company	
2009	Is Life Worth Living?	Annie Twohig	Lennox Robinson	Mint Theater Company, Off-Broadway	
2011	Temporal Powers	Maggie Cooney	Teresa Deevy	Mint Theater Company, Off-Broadway	
2012	Anna Christie	Marthy Owen	Eugene O'Neill	The Waterfront Museum, Brooklyn	
2013	Bell, Book and Candle	Aunt Queenie	John Van Druten	The Gene Frankel Theatre	
2013	The Third Policeman	Yet to be Named at the Mic	Flann O'Brien	La MaMa ETC, Off-Broadway	

=== Radio ===
Title	Role	Author	Broadcaster	Ref.
Macbeth	Lady Macduff	William Shakespeare	California Artists Radio Theatre	
A Midsummer Night's Dream	First Fairy	William Shakespeare	California Artists Radio Theatre	
Twelfth Night	Viola	William Shakespeare	California Artists Radio Theatre	
Little Women (Volume 1)	Meg March	Louisa May Alcott	California Artists Radio Theatre	
Little Women (Volume 2)	Meg March	Louisa May Alcott	California Artists Radio Theatre	
First Love	Zinaida	Ivan Turgenev	California Artists Radio Theatre	
The Seagull	Nina	Anton Chekhov	California Artists Radio Theatre	
An Ideal Husband	Lady Chiltern	Oscar Wilde	California Artists Radio Theatre	
The Importance of Being Earnest	Cecily	Oscar Wilde	California Artists Radio Theatre	
Hobson’s Choice	Maggie Hobson	Harold Brighouse	California Artists Radio Theatre	
Curtain Calls	Kitty Brophy	Jerry Devine	California Artists Radio Theatre	
Oscar in Limbo	Various	Richard Erdman	California Artists Radio Theatre	
The Playboy of the Western World	Margaret Flaherty	John Millington Synge	California Artists Radio Theatre	
Seeds of The Abbey	Various	John Millington Synge & Lady Gregory	California Artists Radio Theatre	
Pygmalion	Mrs. Pearce	George Bernard Shaw	California Artists Radio Theatre	
Getting Married	Edith	George Bernard Shaw	California Artists Radio Theatre	
Christmas With CART	Performer	Peggy Webber	California Artists Radio Theatre	
Shadow and Substance	Thomasina Concannon	Paul Vincent Carroll	California Artists Radio Theatre	
The Dead	Greta	James Joyce	California Artists Radio Theatre	
Letters & Other Beguiling Things	George Simon, Georgie Starbuck Galbraith, Alan Terry, and Katherine Mansfield	Sean McClory	California Artists Radio Theatre	
Anthony & Burr	Maria Reynolds and Theodosia Bartow Burr	Tony Huston	California Artists Radio Theatre	
Blackbeards 14th Wife, Why She Was No Good for Him	Various	Morton Fine and David Friedkin	California Artists Radio Theatre	
Good Evening, My Name is Jack the Ripper	Various	Morton Fine and David Friedkin	California Artists Radio Theatre	
If a Body Need a Body, Call Burke & Hare	Various	Morton Fine and David Friedkin	California Artists Radio Theatre	
