= Brenda Meaney =

American actress

- Born: New York City, U.S.
- Education: Trinity College Dublin (BA); Yale University (MFA)
- Occupation: Actress
- Years active: 2010–present
- Spouse: Henry Clarke
- Parents: Colm Meaney (father); Bairbre Dowling (mother)
- Relatives: Vincent Dowling (grandfather); Brenda Doyle (grandmother)

Brenda Meaney is an Irish-American actress, born in 1984. Best known for her work on stage, in 2023 she appeared opposite her father Colm Meaney in Landmark Productions revival of Bedbound by Enda Walsh. Meaney frequently appears in the plays of Tom Stoppard.

== Early life and education ==
Meaney was born in New York City to Irish actors Bairbre Dowling and Colm Meaney. She spent the majority of her childhood and adolescence in Los Angeles, California, and Dublin, Ireland. She graduated from The Archer School for Girls in 2003.

Meaney later attended Trinity College Dublin, where a childhood fascination with Egyptology inspired her to pursue a Joint honours degree in the History of Art and Architecture & Ancient History and Archaeology. Meaney graduated in 2007 with plans to become a paleontologist, but later decided to pursue acting. She then matriculated to the David Geffen School of Drama at Yale University, graduating in 2013 with an MFA in Acting.

== Career ==
Meaney made her professional stage debut as Melanie Coleman in Lewis Black's One Slight Hitch at the Wellfleet Harbor Actors Theater, directed by Joe Grifasi and appearing opposite Mark Linn-Baker and Lizbeth MacKay. The same year, she appeared in Caryl Churchill's Owners at the Yale Repertory Theatre. The following year, Meaney starred in the West Coast premiere of David Ives' Tony Award winning play Venus in Fur at the American Conservatory Theater in San Francisco, California. Later that same year, she made her New York stage debut as Nell in the American premiere of Tom Stoppard’s Indian Ink at Roundabout Theatre Company, directed by Carey Perloff. In a review for The New York Times, chief theatre critic Ben Brantley deemed the production as one of the year's best plays. Indian Ink was subsequently restaged at the American Conservatory Theater in 2015, with Meaney taking over the lead role of Flora Crewe. In a review for the SFGate, theatre critic Robert Hurwitt observed "Brenda Meaney, who played a smaller role in New York, is a magnetic Flora, as sensually alive as she is smart." Later that same year, Meaney worked in three successive stage productions, appearing as Natella Abashvili in Bertolt Brecht's The Caucasian Chalk Circle at the Yale Repertory Theatre; Helen Stott in C. P. Taylor's And a Nightingale Sang... at the Westport Country Playhouse; and Betty Jones in Harold Chapin's The New Morality at the Mint Theater Company.

In 2016, Meaney reunited with director Carey Perloff, appearing as Hillary in Tom Stoppard’s The Hard Problem at the American Conservatory Theater. In 2018, Meaney starred opposite Academy Award winner Hayley Mills in the American premiere of Isobel Mahon's Party Face at New York City Center. Later that year, Meaney would once again reunite with Perloff to appear as Renia in the regional premiere of Martyna Majok's Queens at the La Jolla Playhouse in San Diego, California. In 2019, Meaney appeared as Jerri in the world premiere of Neil LaBute's Great Negro Works of Art at the Davenport Theatre, programmed as part of the annual LaBute New Theater Festival. Later that year, she starred as Bairbre in Micheál Mac Liammóir's The Mountains Look Different at the Mint Theater Company. The production was named a The New York Times Critics' Pick. Shortly thereafter, Meaney starred opposite Academy Award nominee Marsha Mason in Elaine Murphy's Little Gem at the Irish Repertory Theatre.

In 2023, Meaney appeared in workshop productions of William Shakespeare's Richard II and Henry IV, in repertory at Theatre for a New Audience. Later that year, she returned to Theatre for a New Audience to appear as Pascuala in a new adaptation of Lope de Vega's play Fuenteovejuna, written by Adrian Mitchell. Shortly thereafter, she made her Irish stage debut, starring opposite her father Colm Meaney in Enda Walsh's Bedbound at the Galway International Arts Festival. The production later transferred to Olympia Theatre, Dublin, where it received critical acclaim. Both The Stage and The Arts Review awarded the production 4 stars, while The Irish Times praised the pairs chemistry, and RTÉ Arena described Meaney's performance as "magnetic, electric, and extraordinary." Meaney made her Broadway debut the following year, in a new adaptation of Anton Chekhov's Uncle Vanya at Lincoln Center Theatre, understudying the roles of Sonya and Elena for Alison Pill and Anika Noni Rose, respectively. Later that year, she starred as Gretl in back-to-back productions of Tom Stoppard's Tony Award winning play Leopoldstadt at Huntington Theatre Company in Boston, Massachusetts, and Shakespeare Theatre Company in Washington, D.C.

Meaney made her screen debut in the 2021 family drama There's Always Hope, appearing opposite her father, Colm Meaney. She later had supporting roles as Bridget in Neil LaBute's 2023 action thriller Fear the Night, and Helen in Lorcan Finnegan's 2024 psychological thriller The Surfer, which premiered at the 77th Cannes Film Festival. Her television credits include guest roles on Love/Hate, Hell on Wheels, For Life, and FBI: Most Wanted. From 2021-2024, Meaney starred as Debra in the podcast series Fear, A Love Story on Acast.

== Personal life ==
Meaney is married to American actor Henry Clarke. The pair performed opposite one another in David Ives' Venus in Fur at the American Conservatory Theatre in 2014.

== Credits ==
=== Film ===
Year	Title	Role	Notes	Ref.
2021	There's Always Hope	Amelia		
2023	Fear the Night	Bridget		
2024	The Surfer	Helen		

=== Television ===
Year	Title	Role	Notes	Ref.
2010	Love/Hate	Yvonne	Episode: #1.3	
2014	Hell on Wheels	Anna	Episode: "Reckoning"	
2020	For Life	Granger	Episode: "Character and Fitness"	
2022	FBI: Most Wanted	Lydia Washburn	Episode: Gold Diggers	
2022-2025	Fear, A Love Story	Debra	Main Role: 14 episodes	

=== Stage ===
Year	Title	Role	Playwright	Venue	Ref.
2013	One Slight Hitch	Melanie Coleman	Lewis Black	Wellfleet Harbor Actors Theater	
2013	Owners	Marion	Caryl Churchill	Yale Repertory Theatre	
2014	Venus in Fur	Vanda	David Ives	American Conservatory Theater	
2014	Indian Ink	Nell	Tom Stoppard	Roundabout Theatre Company	
2015	Indian Ink	Flora Crewe	Tom Stoppard	American Conservatory Theater	
2015	The Caucasian Chalk Circle	Natella Abashvili / Aniko	Bertolt Brecht	Yale Repertory Theatre	
2015	And a Nightingale Sang	Helen Scott	C. P. Taylor	Westport Country Playhouse	
2015	The New Morality	Betty Jones	Harold Chapin	Mint Theater Company	
2016	Incognito	Martha Murphy / Elouis Harvey / Brenda Walsh / Anna Vaun / Evelyn Einstein / Margaret Thomson / Lisa-Scott Hannigan / Patricia Thorn / Sharon Shaw u/s	Nick Payne	Manhattan Theatre Club	
2016	The Hard Problem	Hillary	Tom Stoppard	American Conservatory Theater	
2018	Party Face	Maeve	Isobel Mahon	New York City Center	
2018	Queens	Renia	Martyna Majok	La Jolla Playhouse	
2019	Great Negro Works of Art	Jerri	Neil LaBute	Davenport Theatre	
2019	The Mountains Look Different	Bairbre	Micheál Mac Liammóir	Mint Theater Company	
2019	Little Gem	Lorraine	Elaine Murphy	Irish Repertory Theater	
2020	Round Room	Concepta	Honor Molloy	Origin Theatre Company	
2023	Richard II	Sir Stephen Scroop / Lord Willoughby / Lord 1 / Lord Fitzwater	William Shakespeare	Theatre for a New Audience	
2023	Henry IV	Thomas Percy / Doll Tearsheet	William Shakespeare & Dakin Matthews	Theatre for a New Audience	
2023	Fuente Ovejuna	Pascuala	Lope de Vega & Adrian Mitchell	Theatre for a New Audience	
2023	Bedbound	Daughter	Enda Walsh	Galway International Arts Festival	
2023	Bedbound	Daughter	Enda Walsh	Olympia Theatre	
2024	Uncle Vanya	Sonya / Yelena (u/s)	Anton Chekhov & Heidi Schreck	Lincoln Center Theatre	
2024	Leopoldstadt	Gretl	Tom Stoppard	Huntington Theatre Company	
2024	Leopoldstadt	Gretl	Tom Stoppard	Shakespeare Theatre Company	
2025	Irishtown	Aisling	Ciara Elizabeth Smyth	Irish Repertory Theatre	
