= David Birney =

American actor and director (1939–2022)

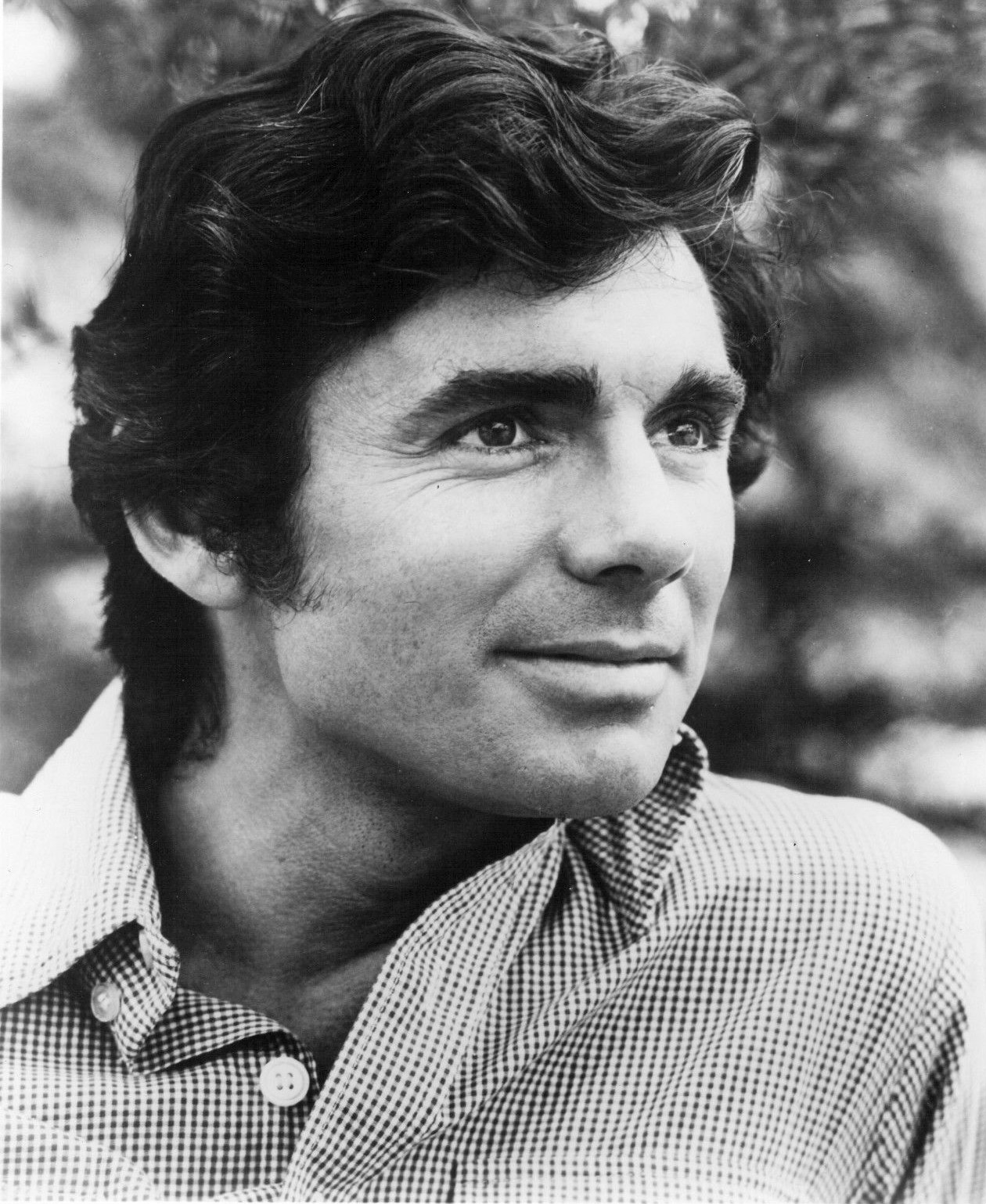
- Birney in 1972
- Born: David Edwin Birney; April 23, 1939; Washington, D.C., U.S.
- Died: April 27, 2022 (aged 83); Santa Monica, California, U.S.
- Education: Dartmouth College (B.A., English); University of California, Los Angeles (M.A., Theatre Arts)
- Occupation: Actor
- Years active: 1965–2007
- Spouse: Meredith Baxter (m. 1974; div. 1989)
- Children: 3

David Edwin Birney (April 23, 1939 – April 27, 2022) was an American actor and director whose career included performances in both contemporary and classical roles in theatre, film, and television. He is noted for having played the title role in the television series Serpico. He also starred in Bridget Loves Bernie, an early 1970s TV series about an interfaith marriage that also starred Meredith Baxter, whom he married after the series ended. He also portrayed Dr. Ben Samuels in St. Elsewhere from 1982 until 1983.

== Early life ==
Birney was born to an Irish Catholic family in Washington, D.C., on April 23, 1939. His father, Edwin, worked as a special agent for the FBI; his mother, Jeanne (née McGee), was a housewife before becoming a real estate agent. Birney attended schools in Brooklyn, Ohio, and graduated from West High School in Cleveland. Named to the National Honor Society, he lettered in basketball, football, and track. He held a B.A. degree from Dartmouth College with "High Distinction" in English literature, English Honors. At the University of California, Los Angeles, Birney earned an M.A. in theatre arts, acting and directing, studying with Ralph Freud and William Melnitz. He held a teaching assistant fellowship and was awarded an honorary Ph.D. in Humanities from Southern Utah University.

== Career ==
=== Stage ===
While in the U.S. Army, Birney won an All Army Entertainment contest and received the "Barter Theatre Award" in 1965. Since the award was an equity contract with the Company for an entire season, he consequently spent the next season with the Barter Theatre, the State Theatre of Virginia, starring or appearing in fifteen shows, directing two others. In the following two years he went on to perform with a range of companies and productions, off-Broadway and in several regional repertory theatres. His New York debut was with Joe Papp's New York Shakespeare Festival as Antipholus of Syracuse in William Shakespeare’s The Comedy of Errors.

Birney worked continually in the theatre performing leading roles with some of the most important theatres in the country. His stage credits included starring roles on Broadway in Amadeus, Benefactors, and Man and Superman. He also had major roles at the American Shakespeare Festival, New York's Lincoln Center Repertory Theatre, the New York Shakespeare Festival, Los Angeles' Mark Taper Forum, Washington, D.C.'s Shakespeare Theatre, Princeton's McCarter Theatre, the Great Lakes Shakespeare Festival, and numerous regional theatres around the country.

Representative roles included: Prince Hamlet, Macbeth, Romeo and Mercutio in Romeo and Juliet, Richard II, Richard III, Benedick in Much Ado About Nothing, Shylock in The Merchant of Venice, Orsino in Twelfth Night, Atticus Finch in To Kill a Mockingbird, Jack Tanner in Man and Superman, Christy Mahon in The Playboy of the Western World, Young Man in Summertree, Cusins in Major Barbara, Jerry in The Zoo Story, Algernon in The Importance of Being Earnest, Arthur in Camelot, Higgins in My Fair Lady, Matt Friedman in Talley's Folly, David in Social Security, Andrew in Love Letters, Jamie in A Moon for the Misbegotten, Victor in The Price, Jaques in As You Like It, the Dauphin in King John, and Shaw in Dear Liar.

=== Audiobooks ===
Birney recorded numerous audiobook bestsellers, including works by Dean Koontz, Paul Theroux, Annie Dillard, and Orson Scott Card. He was conferred the Audie Award for his reading of Julie Salomon's The Christmas Tree, and was also bestowed several AudioFile Magazine Earphone Awards. He played Anakin Skywalker in the radio adaptation of Return of the Jedi.

=== Television ===
Aside from his title role in Bridget Loves Bernie, Birney appeared frequently on television, building a career in TV movies, regular series and miniseries. He starred in such series as Live Shot, Cannon, St. Elsewhere, The Adams Chronicles, Glitter, Serpico, Fantasy Island, Hawaii Five-O, McMillan & Wife, The F.B.I., and Murder, She Wrote. He also starred in the episode "The Nomads" from the 1977 series Quinn Martin's Tales of the Unexpected, known in the United Kingdom as Twist in the Tale. His miniseries credits include Testimony of Two Men, Valley of the Dolls, Night of the Fox, and Master of the Game. He also appeared in the TV series the Love Boat with his wife where he played an Italian escort to an American woman whose friend arranged the encounter.

Birney also appeared in leading roles in many television films, including Long Journey Home and The Deadly Game. He also appeared in the soap operas The Best of Everything and Love Is a Many Splendored Thing.

=== Writing and directing ===
Birney edited and adapted for the stage a two-character play based on some of Mark Twain’s shorter works and letters. The piece, Mark Twain's The Diaries of Adam and Eve, was presented on the PBS series American Playhouse.

Developing the play subsequently for the stage, Birney directed and starred in productions for regional theatres such as the Hartford Stage (opening the Mark Twain Festival in Hartford), the Capital Repertory Theatre, and on tour in performing arts centers across the country. A second play, A Christmas Pudding, a Christmas collage of song, story and poetry of the season was published by Samuel French, Inc.

=== Professional associations ===
Birney served on the Large Theatre Panel of the National Endowment for the Arts and was a board member of the Foundation for Biomedical Research. He also served on the Theatre and Dance Panel of the Jacob Javits Fellowship Foundation. For Dartmouth College he served as a member of the Board of Overseers for the Hopkins Center for the Arts. He initiated and chaired the Class of '61 Legacy: The American Tradition in Performance, helping to create a substantial endowment dedicated to live performance at the Hopkins Center at Dartmouth College.

For five years, Birney co-chaired the American Diabetes Association, speaking and fund raising for the Association. He was an advisor for the Children’s Rights Council, a national nonprofit organization advocating access to both parents after divorce or separation. His contribution to classical theatre was recognized with Washington's Shakespeare Theatre's Millennium Award.

== Personal life ==
Birney married actress Meredith Baxter in 1974. They had starred together in the 1972–73 TV series Bridget Loves Bernie. During their marriage, she was known as Meredith Baxter Birney. Together, they had three children: Kate, Mollie, and Peter. They divorced in 1989. In 2011, she said Birney emotionally and physically abused her during their marriage. He published a lengthy statement on his website disputing the allegations.

== Death ==
In the December 2017 edition of the Wide Wide World newsletter for Dartmouth College class of 1961 alumni, it was disclosed that Birney had been diagnosed with Alzheimer's disease. Birney died on April 27, 2022, four days after his 83rd birthday, at his home in Santa Monica, California. At the time of his death, he was in a domestic partnership with Michele Roberge.

== Filmography ==
=== Film ===
- Caravan to Vaccarès (1974) – Bowman
- Trial by Combat (1976) – Sir John Gifford
- Bye, See You Monday (1979) – Frank
- Oh, God! Book II (1980) – Don Richards
- Prettykill (1987) – Larry Turner
- Nightfall (1988) – Aton
- The Naked Truth (1992) – Fed. #2
- The Comedy of Errors (2000) – The Duke

=== Films for television ===
- Ghost Story (1972 pilot) – John Travis
- Someone's Watching Me! (1978) – Paul Winkless
- OHMS (1980) – Jack Coker
- ABC Afterschool Special (1981, Episode: "I Think I'm Having a Baby") – Mr. Fenning
- The Long Journey Home (1987) – Carter Wells
- Night of the Fox (1990) – Hugh Kelso
- Always Remember I Love You (1990) – Philip Mendham
- Keeping Secrets (1991) – Alan

=== TV mini series ===
- The Adams Chronicles (1976) – John Quincy Adams
- Testimony of Two Men (1977) – Jonathan 'Jon' Ferrier
- Jacqueline Susann's Valley of the Dolls (1981) – Lyon Burke
- Master of the Game (1984) – David Blackwell
