= Cry of the Innocent =

- Genre: Action; Crime drama
- Screenplay by: Sidney Michaels
- Story by: Frederick Forsyth
- Directed by: Michael O'Herlihy
- Starring: Rod Taylor; Joanna Pettet; Nigel Davenport
- Music by: Allyn Ferguson
- Countries of origin: Ireland; United States
- Original language: English

Production
- Executive producers: Theodore P. Donahue; Morgan O'Sullivan
- Producer: Michael O'Herlihy
- Cinematography: Robert L. Morrison
- Editor: Fred A. Chulack
- Running time: 93 minutes
- Production companies: NBC Film; Tara Films; Tara Productions

Original release
- Network: NBC
- Release: June 19, 1980

Cry of the Innocent is a 1980 American-Irish television film directed by Michael O'Herlihy and starring Rod Taylor, Joanna Pettet and Nigel Davenport. It was based on a story by Frederick Forsyth.

== Plot ==
An American insurance executive seeks vengeance for the death of his wife and child in Ireland.

== Cast ==
- Rod Taylor ... Steve Donegin
- Joanna Pettet ... Cynthia Donegin / Candia Leighton
- Nigel Davenport ... Gray Harrison Hunt
- Cyril Cusack ... Detective Inspector Tom Moloney
- Walter Gotell ... Jack Brewster
- Jim Norton ... Jasper Tooms
- Alexander Knox ... Thornton Donegin
- Joe Cahill ... Fritz Grossman
- May Ollis ... Martha
- Bairbre Dowling ... Maureen
- Des Cave ... Supt. Flannagan
- Ronnie Walsh ... Pete Medwin
- Tom Jordan ... Buck Haggerty
- John Franklyn ... Capo
- Des Nealon ... Tooms #2
- Michael O'Sullivan ... Young Garda Officer Gordon
- James N. Healy ... Garda sergeant
- Fidelma Murphy ... Lady clerk
- Maire O'Neill ... Hotel manageress
- Philip Bollard ... Steven Donegin Jr.
- Alison McCormack ... Melody Donegin

== Production ==
The film was shot in Ireland on a budget of one million dollars, financed by NBC. There were plans for a sequel but these did not eventuate.

== Public domain ==
This movie is in the public domain.
