= Nancy Perloff =

American curator and art historian

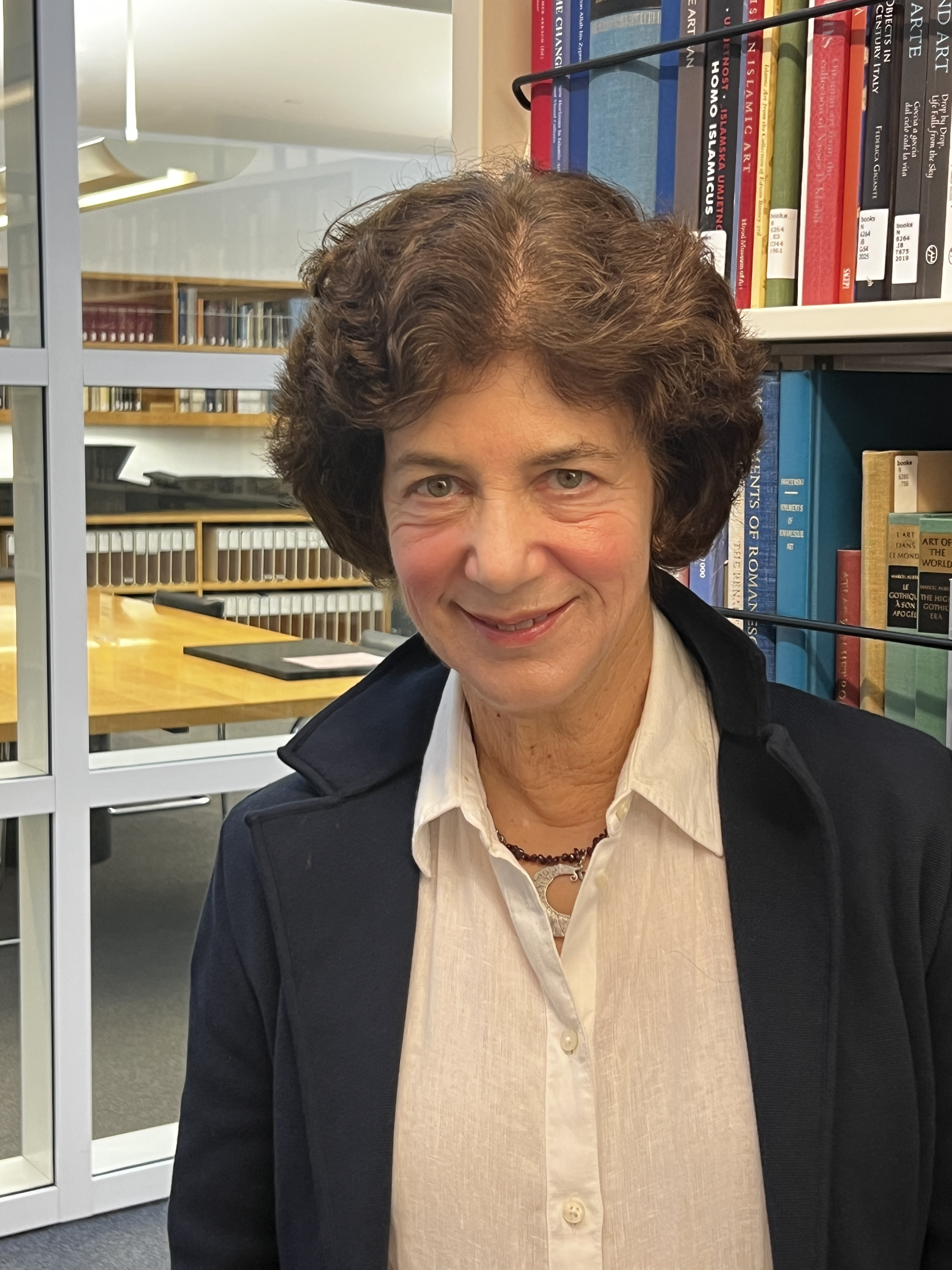
- Nancy Perloff at the Getty Research Institute in 2026
- Education: Stanford University (BA in music, 1979); University of Michigan (PhD in musicology, 1986)
- Occupations: Curator; art historian; musicologist
- Employer: Getty Research Institute
- Title: Curator of Modern and Contemporary Collections
- Parents: Marjorie Perloff (mother); Joseph K. Perloff (father)
- Relatives: Carey Perloff (sister)
- Website: Getty profile

Nancy Perloff is an American curator, art historian, and musicologist. She is curator of modern and contemporary collections at the Getty Research Institute in Los Angeles. Her scholarship and curatorial work focus on the Russian avant-garde, European modernism, concrete and sound poetry, and relationships between music and the visual arts.

== Early life and education ==
Perloff was born to Jewish parents, poetry scholar Marjorie Perloff and cardiologist Joseph K. Perloff. Her sister, Carey Perloff, is a playwright and theater director.

Perloff graduated from Stanford University in 1979, where she studied music. She earned a PhD in musicology from the University of Michigan. Her 1986 dissertation examined the influence of Parisian popular entertainment on the music of Erik Satie, Darius Milhaud, Francis Poulenc, and Georges Auric. This research formed the basis of her first book, Art and the Everyday: Popular Entertainment and the Circle of Erik Satie (1991).

== Career ==
At the Getty Research Institute, Perloff has worked with collections relating to modern art, artists' books, experimental literature, and sound. She has also written and lectured about avant-garde composers including John Cage and David Tudor.

In 1995, Perloff curated The Eye and the Ear: New Directions in Twentieth-Century Musical Notation, an exhibition of twentieth-century scores drawn from the recently acquired David Tudor archive. Perloff and art historian Éva Forgács organized an exhibition called Monuments of the Future: Designs by El Lissitzky (1998–1999), which presented works from Getty holdings by the Jewish Russian artist El Lissitzky. In 2004, she organized Sea Tails: A Video Collaboration, a reconstruction of a 1983 video and sound installation based on materials in the institute's special collections.

Perloff curated Tango with Cows: Book Art of the Russian Avant-Garde, 1910–1917 (2008–2009). The exhibition examined the verbal, visual, and sonic qualities of Russian Futurist books and included digital facsimiles and recordings.

In 2017, Perloff curated Concrete Poetry: Words and Sounds in Graphic Space, which presented more than 100 works from the 1950s through the 1970s.

Perloff organized Sensing the Future: Experiments in Art and Technology (E.A.T.) at the Getty Research Institute in 2024–2025. Drawing on the institute's E.A.T. archive, the exhibition examined projects including 9 Evenings: Theatre & Engineering (1966), the Pepsi Pavilion at Expo '70, and E.A.T.'s later educational and environmental initiatives. An expanded presentation, organized by LUMA Arles in partnership with the institute, was the first exhibition in France devoted to E.A.T.; it ran from May 1, 2025, to January 11, 2026, and added rarely shown works and previously unpublished documents.

In reviews of the Arles presentation, Michael Delgado of Apollo called it the most ambitious exhibition in LUMA's summer program, praising its archival performance footage and experimental works while noting that the exhibition also conveyed the movement's largely male insider culture. Anaël Pigeat of Paris Match described the exhibition as a compelling rediscovery of the movement.

== Publications and reception ==
Perloff's book Explodity: Sound, Image, and Word in Russian Futurist Book Art (2016) developed research associated with Tango with Cows and analyzed Futurist books as combinations of language, image, sound, and material form. In the Los Angeles Review of Books, Eugene Ostashevsky emphasized the book's archival research and its treatment of verbal, visual, and material elements as an integrated whole. Reviewing the book for ARTMargins Online, Eleanor Stoltzfus praised the strength of its close readings.

Perloff edited Concrete Poetry: A 21st-Century Anthology (2021), an international history and anthology related to the 2017 exhibition. Greg Thomas, writing in Burlington Contemporary, likewise praised the anthology's close readings.

=== Selected publications ===
- Art and the Everyday: Popular Entertainment and the Circle of Erik Satie (Clarendon Press, 1991)
- Situating El Lissitzky: Vitebsk, Berlin, Moscow (Getty Research Institute, 2003), co-edited with Brian M. Reed
- Introduction to Had Gadya: The Only Kid; Facsimile of El Lissitzky's Edition of 1919, edited by Arnold J. Band (Getty Research Institute, 2004)
- Explodity: Sound, Image, and Word in Russian Futurist Book Art (Getty Publications, 2016)
- Concrete Poetry: A 21st-Century Anthology (Reaktion Books, 2021), editor
- Sensing the Future: Experiments in Art and Technology (E.A.T.) (Getty Research Institute, 2024), co-edited with Michelle Kuo
