= Brenda Doyle =

Irish actress (1928–1981)

- Doyle on the set of RTÉ's Take My Word, c. 1963
- Born: 1933; Dublin, Ireland
- Died: 12 November 1981 (aged 48); Dublin, Ireland
- Occupation: Actress
- Notable work: Ulysses (1967); A War of Children (1972); A Quiet Day in Belfast (1974)
- Spouse: Vincent Dowling (m. 1952; div. 1975)
- Children: Bairbre Dowling
- Relatives: Brenda Meaney (granddaughter)

Brenda Doyle (Irish: Breanda Ní Dubhghaill; 1933 – 12 November 1981) was an Irish actress, best known for her work on screen and stage, performing in both English and Irish.

== Early life ==
Doyle was from Drumcondra, Dublin. In the late 1940s, she trained at the Brendan Smith Academy of Acting. Shortly after completing her training, she joined the company of the National Theatre of Ireland.

== Career ==
Doyle made her professional stage debut in 1953 at the Abbey Theatre, appearing in an Irish language production of Bláithín agus an Mac Rí by Tomás Mac Anna, Pádraig Ó Siochfhradha, & Caoimhghín Ó Conghaile. This was during a time when the Abbey’s managing director, Ernest Blythe, had a particular interest in producing work in Irish language, requiring fluency from all regular company members. She would go on to appear in additional Irish language productions of Ulysses agus Penelope by Eoghan Ó Tuairisc (1955), Suirí Le Caitríona (and adaptation of William Shakespeare’s The Taming of the Shrew) by Edward Golden (1957), and Aisling as Tír na nÓg by Eoghan Ó Tuairisc & Micheál Mac Conmara (1964).

In 1954, Doyle had a supporting role in Ernest Gébler’s debut play She Sits Smiling at the Pike Theatre. In 1966, she appeared in Love and a Bottle at Micheál Mac Liammóir and Hilton Edwards’ Gate Theatre. In 1971, she appeared in John B. Keane’s The Change in Mame Fadden at the Cork Opera House. Later that same year, she appeared in successive productions of Partly Furnished by Barry L. Hillman, and Doesn't Anyone Remember Murphy by John Quinn, both for the Dublin Theatre Festival. In 1976, she appeared as Moll Buckley in Patrick Galvin’s The Devil's Own People at the Gaiety Theatre. In 1979, she returned to the Abbey Theatre to appear in John Millington Synge’s Epitaph Under Ether. The following year, she appeared in Zoz, a new musical by Joe O’Donnell at the Olympia Theatre. In 1981, Doyle would make her final stage appearance in Shane Connaughton’s Divisions at the Dublin Theatre Festival.

Doyle made her screen debut in Joseph Strick’s 1967 film Ulysses, an adaptation of the James Joyce novel of the same name. The film premiered in competition the 20th Cannes Film Festival, where the French subtitles were censored by festival organizers. The film went on to enjoy critical success in Ireland and abroad. Bosley Crowther of The New York Times included the film on his 1967 "Top Ten List," declaring it "A faithful and brilliant screen translation of Joyce's classic novel, done with taste, imagination and cinema artistry." The film was nominated for Best English-Language Foreign Film at the 25th Golden Globe Awards, and Best Screenplay at the 40th Academy Awards. In 1972, she appeared in George Schaefer’s television film A War of Children. Set to the backdrop of The Troubles, the film follows two families in Belfast who find their long-standing friendship threatened by the escalating sectarian violence. The film was broadcast by CBS in the United States. It won the 1972 Primetime Emmy Award for Outstanding Television Movie, and was nominated in the same category at the 29th Golden Globe Awards.

In 1974, Doyle served as casting director on Canadian drama film A Quiet Day in Belfast, a contemporary retelling of Romeo and Juliet, set amidst The Troubles. Doyle enlisted the talents of Barry Foster, Margot Kidder, and Sean McCann, each of whom would go on to have major film careers. The film was nominated for Best Picture at the 26th Canadian Film Awards.

Doyle first began appearing on television in 1963, as a fixture of the RTÉ variety show Take My Word. The series was a charades-style game show featuring prominent personalities from Irish theatre on opposing teams. The first show was broadcast in January of 1963, and aired through 1965. Doyle went on to have numerous guest roles on various television series, including The Sinners, 2nd House, Childhood, Second City Firsts, The Spike, Teems of Times, Last of Summer, Thursday Play Date, and Strumpet City. Her variety show appearances made her a household name.

== Personal life and death ==
In 1952, she married fellow actor and future Artistic Director of the National Theatre of Ireland, Vincent Dowling. Together they had four daughters, including actress Bairbre Dowling. The family lived on Shanowen Road in Santry, Co. Dublin. Doyle and Dowling had a relatively progressive marriage, allowing for both to partake in a series of extramarital affairs. One such affair produced their third daughter, Valerie. Although aware of this, Dowling always functioned as the girl’s father.

Doyle and Dowling's marriage dissolved in 1967 over Dowling's relationship with a much younger Abbey actress, Sinéad Cusack, daughter of the renowned actor Cyril Cusack. Dowling's affair with Cusack resulted in the birth of a son, Richard Boyd Barrett, who was put up for adoption. Doyle was awarded the family home and custody of her four daughters, while Dowling moved into a flat in the Dublin City Centre.

Doyle died in a motorcycle accident in Dublin on 12 November 1981, at the age of 48.

== Acting credits ==
=== Film ===
Year	Title	Role	Notes
1967	Ulysses	Various	
1972	A War of Children	Mrs. Fiske	
1974	A Quiet Day in Belfast	Mrs. McDuatt	Casting Director

=== Television ===
Year	Title	Role	Notes
1963-1965	Take My Word	Herself	Unknown episodes
1971	The Sinners	Mrs. Carty	Episode: "Legal Aide"
1973	2nd House	Mrs. Donnelley	Episode: "An Anthology for November"
1974	Childhood	Minnie Connolly	Episode: "An Only Child"
1976	Second City Firsts	Mary	Episode: "Traveling Free"
1978	The Spike	Mrs. McWilliams	2 episodes
1978	Teems of Times	Mrs. Murphy	Episode: "The Singing Streets"
1978	Last of Summer	Performer	2 episodes
1979	Thursday Play Date	Performer	Episode: "Mobile Homes"
1980	Strumpet City	Mrs. Farrell	2 episodes

=== Stage ===
Year	Title	Role	Playwright	Venue	Ref.
1953	Bláithín agus an Mac Rí	An Buachaill sa Phictiúrlann	Tomás Mac Anna, Pádraig Ó Siochfhradha, & Caoimhghín Ó Conghaile	Abbey Theatre	
1954	She Sits Smiling	Lodger	Ernest Gébler	Pike Theatre	
1955	Ulysses agus Penelope	Rinceoir	Eoghan Ó Tuairisc	Abbey Theatre	
1957	Suirí Le Caitríona	Mac Léinn	William Shakespeare & Edward Golden	Damer Hall	
1964	Aisling as Tír na nÓg	Leipreachán	Eoghan Ó Tuairisc & Micheál Mac Conmara	Abbey Theatre	
1966	Love and a Bottle	Trudge	George Farquhar, Bill Morrison, & Michael Ruggins	Gate Theatre	
1971	The Change in Mame Fadden	Whore	John B. Keane	Cork Opera House	
1971	Partly Furnished	Mrs. Smethers	Barry L Hillman	Dublin Theatre Festival	
1971	Doesn't Anyone Remember Murphy	Mrs. Murphy	John Quinn	Dublin Theatre Festival	
1976	The Devil's Own People	Moll Buckley	Patrick Galvin	Gaiety Theatre	
1979	Epitaph Under Ether	Second Woman	John Millington Synge & Tom Murphy	Abbey Theatre	
1980	Zoz	Biddy McGrane	Joe O'Donnell	Olympia Theatre	
1981	Divisions	Nun/Mother	Shane Connaughton	Dublin Theatre Festival	
