= There's Always Hope =

- Theatrical release poster
- Directed by: Tim Lewiston
- Written by: Tim Lewiston
- Produced by: Victor Glynn; Alan Latham; Harriet Hammond
- Starring: Colm Meaney; Hannah Chinn; Kate Ashfield; John Light; Brenda Meaney
- Cinematography: Ali Asad
- Edited by: Jeremy Gibb
- Music by: Guy Farley
- Production companies: Monte Productions; Spy Manor Productions; Bad Penny Productions; MovieBox
- Distributed by: Smile Entertainment (Europe); Cineplex Odeon Films (North America)
- Release date: October 22, 2021 (NBFF)
- Countries: England, Portugal
- Language: English
- Budget: $4.5 million

There's Always Hope is a 2021 British drama film written and directed by Tim Lewiston. An international co-production between England and Portugal, the film premiered in competition at the Newport Beach Film Festival. The cast includes Colm Meaney, Hannah Chinn, Kate Ashfield, John Light, and Brenda Meaney.

== Plot ==
There's Always Hope follows the story of Jonathan (Colm Meaney), a once-famous author who is struggling with writer’s block and a failing marriage. When his wife (Kate Ashfield) leaves him for another man (John Light), Jonathan retreats to their holiday home in Portugal, seeking solitude. However, his estranged daughter Hope (Hannah Chinn) arrives, determined to reconnect with him, and understand the reasons behind her parents’ separation. Hope eventually enlists the help of her older half-sister (Brenda Meaney), and as the three spend time together, old wounds resurface, and Jonathan is forced to confront his past mistakes and personal regrets. Through their emotional journey, both father and daughter learn valuable lessons about love, forgiveness, and second chances.

== Cast ==
- Colm Meaney as Jonathan
- Hannah Chinn as Hope
- Kate Ashfield as Samantha
- John Light as Luke
- Brenda Meaney as Amelia
- Cristina Cavalinhos as Gabriela
- Bethany Antonia as Pen
- Francisco Fernandez as Rodrigo
- Laura Rollins as Sanya

== Release ==
There's Always Hope debuted at the Newport Beach Film Festival on October 22, 2021. The film later screened at the Sonoma International Film Festival on March 23, 2022; the Southend Film Festival on May 26, 2022; the Evolution Mallorca International Film Festival on October 29, 2022; and the Manchester Film Festival on March 18, 2023.

The film had a theatrical release in Canada through Cineplex Odeon Films, beginning March 3, 2023. The film was made available to stream in the Netherlands and the United Kingdom beginning in 2023, and in the United States, Denmark, Finland, Norway, and Sweden beginning in 2024, through Smile Entertainment.

== Reception ==
The film received mostly negative reviews from critics. Andrew Parker, writing for TheGATE.ca gave the film 1.5/5 stars, noting "Making movies is hard, and I hope that the fittingly titled indie family drama There’s Always Hope was a passion project brought to life simply through the spirit of filmmaking and a specific desire to tell this story. I express that sentiment because There’s Always Hope is a very, very bad movie, one that probably shouldn’t be released theatrically."

Jim Slotek of Original Cin gave the film a "C", writing "Like a bumblebee’s flight, the marriage-in-peril film There’s Always Hope seems ungainly and unlikely, involving as it does a decades-long union that dissolves with virtually zero drama or emotion. In fact, the movie is so innocuous, it plays like a movie you might see playing in the background of another movie."

Harry Duke, writing for North Bay Stage and Screen, gave the film a more mixed review, noting There's Always Hope is a pleasant enough film, with some good acting and gorgeous cinematography (it was filmed at the Algarve, Portugal) but there’s not much new here. Also, Light’s character is written out of sync with the rest of them and throws the film a bit off balance."
