= Indian Ink =

1995 theatre play of Tom Stoppard

- Cover of the Faber edition
- Written by: Tom Stoppard
- Original language: English
- Subject: India, art, poetry
- Genre: Drama
- Setting: India in the 1930s; India and England in the 1980s

Premiere
- Date premiered: 1995
- Place premiered: Yvonne Arnaud Theatre, Guildford

Indian Ink is a 1995 play by Tom Stoppard based on his 1991 radio play In the Native State.

== Productions ==
=== United Kingdom ===
The stage version of Indian Ink had its first performance at the Yvonne Arnaud Theatre, Guildford, with Felicity Kendal as Flora Crewe, Paul Bhattacharjee as Anish Das, Margaret Tyzack as Eleanor Swan and Art Malik as Nirad Das; it transferred to the Aldwych Theatre, London, on February 27, 1995. The production was directed by Peter Wood and designed by Carl Toms.

=== United States ===
The play had its American premiere in 1999 at the American Conservatory Theater (ACT) in San Francisco, California, directed by Carey Perloff (see 1999 in literature). The ACT production starred Jean Stapleton (Eleanor), Art Malik (Nirad), Susan Gibney (Flora), Firdous Bamji (Anish) and Ken Grantham (Eldon Pike).

The play received its East Coast premiere in 2000 at the Studio Theatre in Washington, DC., in a production starring Isabel Keating as Flora Crewe, a performance for which she received the Helen Hayes Award for Outstanding Lead Actress in a Resident Play.

The play was also produced in a critically acclaimed production in Chicago at The Apple Tree Theatre in June 2002, directed by Mark Lococo and starred Susie McMonagle (Flora), Peggy Roeder (Eleanor), Anish Jethmalani (Nirad), Paul Slade Smith (Eldon Pike), and Parvesh Cheena (Dilip).

The play was produced Off-Off-Broadway at Walkerspace in August 2003, directed by Ashok Sinha with Lethia Nall (Flora), Sendhil Ramamurthy (Nirad) and Helen-Jean Arthur (Eleanor).

The Roundabout Theatre Company produced Indian Ink Off-Broadway in September 2014 to November 30, 2014, at the Laura Pels Theatre. Directed by Carey Perloff, the cast featured Rosemary Harris as Eleanor Swan, Romola Garai as Flora and Firdous Bamji as Nirad. The play was nominated for the 2015 Lucille Lortel Awards, Outstanding Costume Design (Candice Donnelly), Outstanding Revival, and Firdous Bamji won an Obie Award for his performance. New York Times critic, Ben Brantley, wrote that he should have been nominated for a Tony Award, but he was ineligible because the play was produced Off-Broadway. The ACT presented the play again in January and February 2015, with Perloff directing and the cast featured Roberta Maxwell (Eleanor), Brenda Meaney (Flora), Firdous Bamji (Nirad) and Pej Vahdat (Anish).

=== Casting ===
Art Malik has been closely associated with the play, taking the role of Nirad Das in the 1995 Guildford premiere and London production, and in the 1999 American premiere which took place at the American Conservatory Theater in San Francisco. Felicity Kendal created the role of Flora, originally in the radio play and then on stage, which Irish actress Niamh Cusack also played in London's Aldwych Theatre in the West End.

== Synopsis ==
In 1930, the year of Gandhi's Salt March, British poet Flora Crewe travels to India for her health. Flora is a thoroughly modern girl who has modeled for Modigliani, hobnobbed with communists, and been accused of obscenity for the racy book A Nymph and Her Muse. In India her portrait is painted by the Indian artist Nirad while she fends off the attentions of a dashing but dimwitted scion of the British Raj. But her bravado hides the knowledge that she is severely ill with tuberculosis.

In the 1980s, American academic Eldon Pike seeks out Flora's younger sister Eleanor to discover the truth about the end of the poet's life — she died in India soon after meeting Nirad. Eleanor, who married an Englishman she met at Flora's grave and became a staunch Conservative, reveals little to the scholar, sending him off on a wild goose chase tracing Flora's path through India. But she is more welcoming to Nirad's son Anish, who also comes looking for answers. Eleanor shows Anish a painting by Nirad done partly in a classical Indian style, and partly in the style of Western realism. The painting's erotic symbolism convinces him that his father and Flora were lovers before she died.

== Themes ==
Among the play's themes is the contrast of Indian and European styles of poetry and visual art. Nirad explains to Flora the classical Indian theory of nine rasas, which are tonal schemes uniting all forms of art. Each rasa is associated with a colour, a mood, and a musical scale. The play's title refers to Shringara, the rasa of erotic love, which is associated with an inky blue-black colour and the god Krishna, who is always painted with dusky blue skin. Flora is at first puzzled by this artistic tradition, but on falling in love with Nirad she realizes, "It is the colour he looked by moonlight."

The play shares with other Stoppard plays of the 1990s the theme of nostalgia and romantic loss, with Flora as the lost beloved corresponding to Thomasina in Arcadia and Moses in The Invention of Love. And like those two plays, it cuts back and forth between characters in two time periods sharing the same set. Stoppard has given director Peter Wood partial credit for developing the structure of the play with its two intertwined storylines.

== Reception ==
Ben Brantley expressed a lukewarm view of Indian Ink, deeming it "enticing if overpacked". He praised Stoppard's language and found the dialogue witty, but argued that the work contains an overabundance of characters and that "all the mini-history lessons and intellectual name-dropping in Indian Ink keep us from latching on emotionally to the play’s central relationships. The Indian theater director Gopal Gandhi wrote a moderately positive review in The Independent. Gandhi argued that Das had mastery of English geography and literature but expositions of the rasa and Hindu scripture that seemed "to come not from Stoppard but some teach yourself guide", and wrote in response to this, "Indians have for decades, if not a century or two, been able to relate to things British without, in the least, compromising their brand of Indianess. They need no atavistic reversals into 'themselves'. What is Stoppard trying to do in Indian Ink?" However, Gandhi also felt that "there was [Stoppard]'s bitter-sweet topping to enjoy, for the sadness it evoked, for the regrets it reminded me of", and recommended the play overall. Matt Wolf of Variety criticized the play as "clunky" and "overwritten", and also stated that Flora Crewe is "crucially lacking in either a creative or erotic dimension, notwithstanding the fact that Flora’s principal topic seems to have been sex."

Jesse Green stated in Vulture that although the various elements and time periods don't satisfactorily emulsify, "there's no denying the astonishing craft of the individual scenes". Green referred to the play as "second-tier Tom Stoppard but excellent by almost any other standard". Elysa Gardner of USA Today also gave the play 3.5 out of 4 stars, writing that Crewe's sharp-witted and romantic nature "provides an ideal vehicle for Stoppard's piercingly beautiful, expressive language."
