= Gerald Freedman =

American theater director (1927–2020)

- Born: June 25, 1927; Lorain, Ohio, U.S.
- Died: March 17, 2020 (aged 92); Winston-Salem, North Carolina, U.S.
- Monuments: The Gerald Freedman Theatre at UNCSA (2012)
- Education: Northwestern University (BA, MA)
- Title: Dean Emeritus, School of Drama, University of North Carolina School of the Arts
- Parents: Barnie B. Freedman; Fannie (Sepsenwol) Freedman
- Awards: Obie

Gerald Alan Freedman (June 25, 1927 – March 17, 2020) was an American theatre director, librettist, and lyricist, and a college dean.

== Early life and education ==
Freedman was born in Lorain, Ohio, the son of Fannie (Sepenswol), a history teacher, and Barnie B. Freedman, a dentist. His parents were Russian Jewish immigrants. He earned a Bachelor of Arts a Master's degree from Northwestern University.

== Career ==
Freedman began his career as assistant director of such projects as Bells Are Ringing, West Side Story, and Gypsy. His first credit as a Broadway director was the 1961 musical The Gay Life. Additional Broadway credits include the 1964 and 1980 revivals of West Side Story, The Incomparable Max (1971), Arthur Miller's The Creation of the World and Other Business (1972), the 1975 and 1976 productions of The Robber Bridegroom, both of which garnered him Drama Desk Award nominations as Outstanding Director of a Musical, The Grand Tour (1979) with Joel Grey, and The School for Scandal (1995) with Tony Randall. He was also the off-Broadway director of the rock musical Hair when it premiered at the Public Theater.

Freedman was leading artistic director (1960–1967) and artistic director (1967–1971) of Joseph Papp's New York Shakespeare Festival, artistic director of the Great Lakes Theater Festival in Cleveland, Ohio (1985–1997), and co-artistic director of John Houseman’s The Acting Company (1974–1977). He taught at Yale School of Drama and the Juilliard School. He was Dean of the Drama School at the University of North Carolina School of the Arts (1991–2012). He was the first American ever invited to direct at the Globe Theatre in London.

== Personal life and memberships ==
He was a member of the Kennedy Center New Play Committee and the College of Fellows of the American Theatre. He participated in the Oomoto Institute, Kameoka, Japan. He died on March 17, 2020, at his home in Winston-Salem, North Carolina of kidney failure.

== Bibliography ==
- Freedman, Gerald (1963). As you like it. LCCN 2009656639. (theater program)
- Freedman, Gerald (1974). Au pair man. LCCN 2009656652. (theater program)
- Freedman, Gerald (1970). Colette. LCCN 2009656970. (theater program)
- Freedman, Gerald (1962). The gay life. LCCN 2009657393. (theater program)
- Freedman, Gerald (1967). Hair. LCCN 2009657509. (theater program)
- Freedman, Gerald (1974). Love's labour's lost. LCCN 2009658070. (theater program)
- Freedman, Gerald (1976). Mrs. Warren's profession. LCCN 2009658334. (theater program)
- Freedman, Gerald (1966). A time for singing. LCCN 2010368387. (theater program)
- Herman, Jerry; Freedman, Gerald. Jerry Herman collection 1950–2003 (bulk 1960–1990). LCCN 2006560772. 20 linear ft. (10850 items)
- Freedman, Gerald; Morris, John (c. 1966). Alexander H. Cohen presents A time for singing. arranged by Don Walker. Warner Bros. LCCN 94760475. HS 1639 Warner Bros. Music Sound Recording 33 1/3 12 inch LP
- Shakespeare, William (1968). Love's labour's lost. With an essay on the direction of the play by Gerald Freedman. New York: Macmillan. LCCN 68020763.
