= Marjorie Perloff =

American academic (1931–2024)

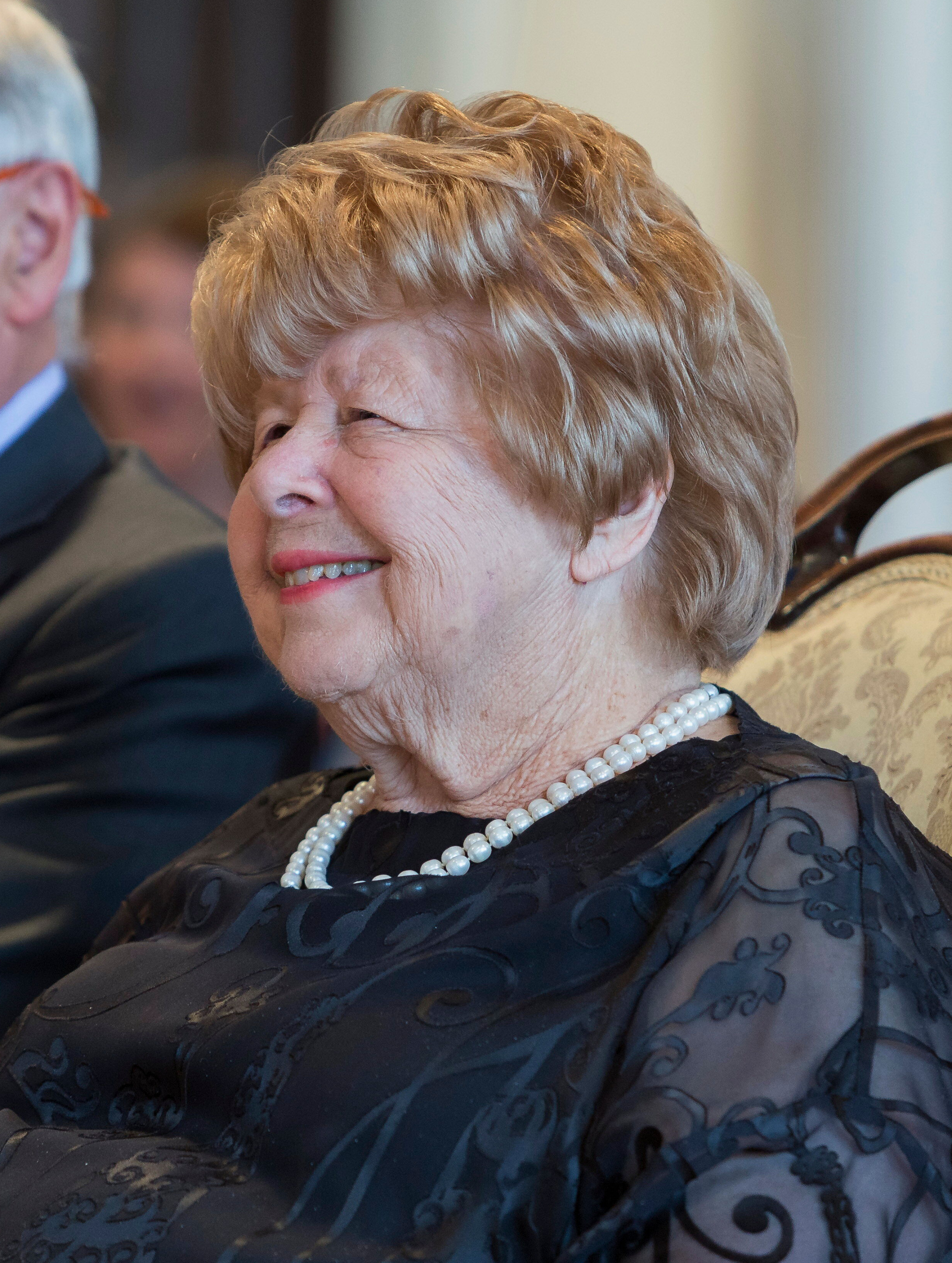
- Marjorie Perloff at the ceremony conferring an honorary doctorate from the University of Innsbruck, Austria (2016)
- Born: Gabriele Schüller Mintz; September 28, 1931; Vienna, Austria
- Died: March 24, 2024 (aged 92); Los Angeles, California, U.S.
- Spouse: Joseph K. Perloff (m. 1953; died 2014)
- Children: Nancy Perloff, Carey Perloff
- Awards: Austrian Cross of Honour for Science and Art, First Class (2021)

Academic background
- Education: Barnard College (AB); Catholic University of America (MA, PhD)

Academic work
- Institutions: USC; Stanford University; University of Maryland; Catholic University of America
- Main interests: Modern poetry and poetics
- Notable works: Radical Artifice: Writing Poetry in the Age of Media (1991); Unoriginal Genius: Poetry by Other Means in the New Century (2010); Private Notebooks: 1914–1916 (translation, 2022)

Marjorie Perloff (Note: Pronounced /ˈpɜːrlɒf/ PUR-lof) (born Gabriele Mintz; September 28, 1931 – March 24, 2024) was an Austrian-born American poetry scholar and critic, known for her study of avant-garde poetry.

Perloff was a professor at Catholic University, the University of Maryland, College Park, the University of Southern California and Stanford University.

She wrote books about W. B. Yeats, Robert Lowell, and Frank O'Hara and promoted poetry that normally was not discussed in the United States, such as works by Louis Zukofsky, Kenneth Goldsmith, and Brazilian poetry. Perloff was widely considered the most influential critic of experimental poetry. She coined the term "unoriginal genius" to reflect the desire of some contemporary poets to create poetry by using other people's words and constraint-based practices rather than inspiration or other personal sources.

== Early life ==
Perloff was born Gabriele Schüller Mintz on September 28, 1931, into a secularized Jewish family in Vienna. The annexation of Austria by Nazi Germany exacerbated Viennese antisemitism, and so the family emigrated in 1938, when she was six-and-a-half, going first to Zürich and then to the United States, settling in the Riverdale section of the Bronx, where she attended the Ethical Culture Fieldston School. According to Adam Kirsch, "Perloff can be counted as perhaps the youngest of the great wave of European Jewish intellectual refugees who immeasurably enriched American culture." She changed her name to Marjorie when she was a teenager, as she felt it sounded "more American".

After attending Oberlin College from 1949 to 1952, she graduated magna cum laude and Phi Beta Kappa from Barnard College in 1953; that year, she married Joseph K. Perloff, a cardiologist focused on congenital heart disease. She completed her graduate work at the Catholic University of America in Washington, D.C., earning an M.A. in 1956 and a Ph.D. in 1965; her dissertation on W. B. Yeats was later published as a book entitled Rhyme and Meaning in the Poetry of Yeats in 1970.

== Career ==
Perloff taught at Catholic University from 1966 to 1971. She then moved on to become Professor of English at the University of Maryland, College Park (1971–1976) and Professor of English and Comparative Literature at the University of Southern California (1976–1986) and Stanford University (1986–1990). Her position was endowed as the Sadie Dernham Patek Professor of Humanities at Stanford (1990—2000; emerita from 2001). She was also Florence Scott Professor of English Emerita at the University of Southern California.

Her work has been especially concerned with explicating the writing of experimental and avant-garde poets and relating it to the major currents of modernist and, especially, postmodernist activity in the arts, including the visual arts and literary theory.

The first three books published by Perloff each focused on different poets: Yeats, Robert Lowell, and Frank O'Hara respectively. In 1981, she changed directions with The Poetics of Indeterminacy, which began her work on avant-gardist poetry, paving the way for The Futurist Moment: Avant-Garde, Avant-Guerre, and the Language of Rupture in 1986 and many subsequent titles. Differentials: Poetry, Poetics, Pedagogy, published in 2004, won the Robert Penn Warren Prize in 2005 as well as Honorable Mention for the Robert Motherwell Prize of the Dedalus Foundation.

Perloff did much to promote poetics that are not normally part of the discourse in the United States such as works of Louis Zukofsky, Kenneth Goldsmith, or Brazilian poetry. She was widely considered the most influential critic of experimental poetry. She was credited with coining the term — "unoriginal genius" — to reflect the interest of some contemporary poets in generating their work by citational and constraint-based practices rather than inspiration or other personal sources. Her work on contemporary American poetry, and, in particular, poetry associated with Language poetry and the Objectivist poets, posits and critiques an "Official Verse Culture" that determines what is and is not worthy of publication, critique and emulation. In 2001, she gave the British Academy's Sarah Tryphena Phillips Lecture in American Literature and History, on Gertrude Stein's Differential Syntax.

In 2008–09, she was the Weidenfeld Visiting professor of European Comparative Literature in St Anne's College, Oxford. She was also member of the International Jury of the Janus Pannonius Grand Prize for Poetry Foundation (an award of the Hungarian PEN Club).

== Personal life and death ==
Perloff and her husband, who died in 2014, had two daughters, Carey Perloff and Nancy Perloff.

Perloff's memoir, The Vienna Paradox: A Memoir, was published in 2004.

Perloff died at her home in Pacific Palisades, Los Angeles, on March 24, 2024, at the age of 92.

== Selected works ==
- Tractatus Logico-Philosophicus: A New Translation (translated by Damion Searls, with a foreword by Marjorie Perloff) (Liveright, 2024) ISBN 978-1-324-09243-8
- Wittgenstein, Ludwig, Private Notebooks: 1914–1916 (translated by Marjorie Perloff) (Liveright, 2022) ISBN 978-1-324-09080-9
- Edge of Irony: Modernism in the Shadow of the Habsburg Empire. Chicago: University of Chicago Press. 2016. ISBN 9780226054421. OL 27210583M.
- Poetics in a New Key: Interviews and Essays (University of Chicago Press, 2014) ISBN 978-0-226-19941-2 Read an excerpt.
- Unoriginal Genius: Poetry by Other Means in the New Century (University of Chicago Press, 2010) ISBN 978-0-226-66061-5. Spanish version: El genio no original: Poesía por otros medios en el nuevo siglo (greylock, 2019) ISBN 978-84-948280-4-1
- Differentials: Poetry, Poetics, Pedagogy (University of Alabama Press, 2004) ISBN 978-0-8173-1421-7
- The Vienna Paradox: A Memoir (New Directions Books, 2004) ISBN 978-0-8112-1571-8
- The Futurist Moment: Avant-Garde, Avant Guerre, and the Language of Rupture, with a New Preface (University of Chicago Press, 2003) pbk. ISBN 978-0-226-65738-7
- Poetry On and Off the Page: Essays for Emergent Occasions (Northwestern University Press, 1998) ISBN 978-0-8101-1560-6
- Frank O'Hara: Poet Among Painters (University of Chicago Press, 1998) ISBN 978-0-226-66059-2 (originally published by Braziller, 1977)
- The Dance of the Intellect: Studies in the Poetry of the Pound Tradition (Northwestern University Press, 1996) pbk. ISBN 978-0-8101-1380-0
- Wittgenstein's Ladder: Poetic Language and the Strangeness of the Ordinary (University of Chicago Press, 1996) pbk. ISBN 978-0-226-66058-5
- Radical Artifice: Writing Poetry in the Age of Media (University of Chicago Press, 1991) ISBN 978-0-226-65733-2
- Poetic License: Studies in the Modernist and Postmodernist Lyric (Northwestern University Press, 1990) ISBN 978-0-8101-0843-1

== Critical studies and reviews of Perloff's work ==
Radical artifice

- Golding, Alan (Spring 1994). "Avant-gardes and American poetry". Contemporary Literature. 35 (1): 156–170. doi:10.2307/1208740. JSTOR 1208740.
