= The Weekend Nun =

1972 American television film

The Weekend Nun is a 1972 American television film (an ABC Movie of the Week) directed by Jeannot Szwarc. It was based on the true story of Joyce Duco, a nun who became a probation officer.

== Cast ==
- Joanna Pettet as Sister Mary Damian
- Vic Morrow as Chuck Jardine
- Ann Sothern as Mother Bonaventure
- Kay Lenz as Audree Prewitt
- Beverly Garland as Bobby Sue Prewitt
- James Gregory as Sid Richardson
- Marion Ross as Mrs. Crowe
- Barbara Werle as Sister Gratia
- Tina Andrews as Bernetta
- Judson Pratt as Priest
- Lynn Borden as Connie

== Reception ==
The Los Angeles Times wrote it was "surely one of the finest films ever made for television."
