= Fear the Night =

2023 film by Neil LaBute

- Theatrical release poster
- Directed by: Neil LaBute
- Written by: Neil LaBute
- Produced by: Larry Greenberg; Lucas Jarach; Eric Brenner
- Starring: Maggie Q; Kat Foster; Travis Hammer; Gia Crovatin
- Cinematography: Rogier Stoffers
- Edited by: Vincent F. Welch
- Music by: Adam Bosarge
- Production companies: Quiver Distribution; Highland Film Group
- Distributed by: Quiver Distribution
- Release date: July 21, 2023
- Country: United States
- Language: English

Fear the Night is a 2023 American action thriller film directed and written by Neil LaBute. It stars Maggie Q, Kat Foster, Travis Hammer and Gia Crovatin.

== Plot ==
Tess, an Iraq War veteran and recovering alcoholic, returns home to heal. She has a strained relationship with her sister Beth, but they reconcile temporarily to attend their sister Rose's bachelorette party at the family farm. Tess tolerates the group, preferring to observe from a distance, sensing something isn't right with the caretakers. Beth dismisses her worries as fussing.

Later that night, as the bachelorette party enjoys a male stripper, Tess goes outside alone. Rose checks on Tess, and Beth joins, but Beth gets angry seeing Rose comforting Tess, thinking Tess is making everything about herself when Rose should be inside enjoying her party. Suddenly, attackers strike, killing Rose with a crossbow. Tess brings Rose's body inside, alarming everyone. Confused, they wonder what's happening as arrows continue flying, killing the stripper. Tess, the only trained fighter, orders everyone to darken the house, barricade inside, and find a way to call for help.

As women call for help, Tess kills an attacker outside and has the women check his ID, but no one recognizes him. Tess leaves tools for self-defense. Esther tries to get a phone signal but is shot dead with an arrow. Perry demands money, but women are confused. They decide Mia should run for help. Mia tells Tess she has a crush on her, then runs to get help but finds no phone connection. She is chased and kills her pursuer before escaping. While waiting, someone knocks; Divya opens the door, hoping it's Tess, but Perry's men kill her and storm in.

Tess infiltrates the caretakers' home, questions a man who admits they sell meth for Perry's gang and hide the drug money on the farm, making the women look like thieves. Perry and his men want to kill them all. Tess plans to take the caretaker, but he's killed by an attacker. Tess kills the attacker with a pitchfork. Only Beth, Noelle, and Bridget survive at the house. Bridget is killed by Perry, who then searches the property. Noelle offers herself to Tim for freedom. Tess and the women defeat the last of Perry's gang. Tess kills Perry after a fight for his cash. The next morning, she leaves bloody, holding a beer.

After the attack, Tess, Beth, Mia, and Noelle survive and return to town for help. Tess gives an altered statement, claiming the attackers captured, killed some, and turned on each other over money. She says they killed two attackers in self-defense before coming to town. The sheriff doubts her but lets her go, pending lawsuits. The story ends with Tess and Beth reconciling and Tess traveling with Mia. Her legal issues, the meth money, and the true story remain unresolved.

== Cast ==
- Maggie Q as Tess
- Kat Foster as Beth
- Travis Hammer as Perry
- Gia Crovatin as Mia
- Brenda Meaney as Bridget
- James Carpinello as Bart
- Highdee Kuan as Rose
- Ito Aghayere as Noelle

== Production ==
Principal photography began in Los Angeles in April 2022.

== Release ==
The film was released in theaters, on digital and on demand on July 21, 2023.

== Reception ==
On the review aggregator website Rotten Tomatoes, 31% of 32 critics' reviews are positive, with an average rating of 4.8/10. The website's consensus reads: "Despite typically strong work from Maggie Q, Fear the Night is a fairly generic and disappointingly tension-free thriller from writer-director Neil LaBute." Metacritic, which uses a weighted average, assigned the film a score of 30 out of 100, based on 4 critics, indicating "generally unfavorable" reviews.
