= Joanna Pettet =

English-Canadian actress (1942–2026)

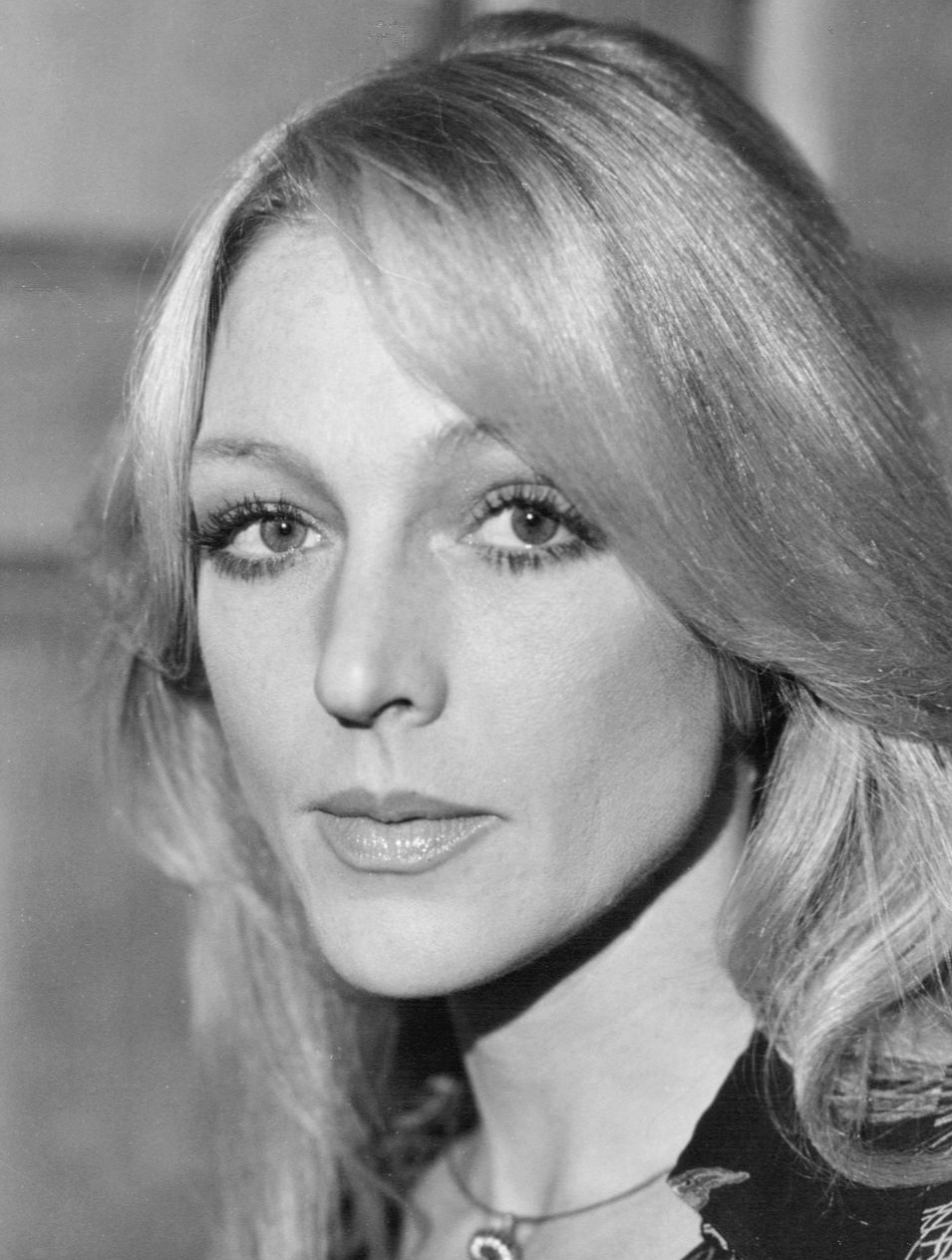
- Pettet in 1976
- Born: Joanna Jane Salmon; 16 November 1942; London, England
- Died: 7 July 2026 (aged 83); Temecula, California, U.S.
- Education: Neighborhood Playhouse School of the Theatre
- Occupation: Actress
- Years active: 1961–1990
- Spouse: Alex Cord (m. 1968; div. 1989)
- Children: 1
- Family: Francis Egerton (great-grandfather)

Joanna Jane Pettet (née Salmon; 16 November 1942 – 7 July 2026) was an English-Canadian actress. She was known for her roles in several notable films of the late 1960s, including the comedic James Bond film Casino Royale, Robbery, The Group, and The Night of the Generals.

== Early life and education ==
Pettet was born on 16 November 1942 and spent her early childhood in Chelsea, London, England, the daughter of Harold Nigel Egerton Salmon (illegitimate grandson of Francis Egerton) and Cecily J. Tremaine, who were married in Chelsea in 1940. Her father, a British Royal Air Force (RAF) pilot, was killed in the Second World War in 1943. After the war, her mother remarried and settled in Montréal, where Joanna was adopted by her stepfather and assumed his surname of Pettet. She attended Westmount High School.

When Pettet was in her teens, she moved to New York City to pursue acting. She studied with Sanford Meisner at the Neighborhood Playhouse School of the Theatre, as well as at the Lincoln Center.

== Career ==
Pettet made her debut, aged 19, on Broadway in Take Her, She's Mine (21 December 1961 – 8 December 1962). She also appeared on Broadway in The Chinese Prime Minister, and Poor Richard.

Beginning in 1964 with an episode of Route 66, she began making guest appearances in several US dramatic television series of the mid-sixties, including The Doctors, The Nurses, The Trials of O'Brien, The Fugitive, A Man Called Shenandoah, and Dr. Kildare.

She was cast in writer/producer Sidney Buchman's 1966 adaptation of Mary McCarthy's novel The Group. The success of that film launched a film career that included roles in The Night of the Generals (1967), as Mata Bond in the James Bond spoof Casino Royale (1967), Peter Yates's Robbery (1967) with Stanley Baker, Blue (1968) with Terence Stamp, and the Victorian period comedy The Best House in London (1969).

In the 1970s, Pettet's feature film appearances became sporadic and included roles in the cult horror films Welcome to Arrow Beach (1974) and The Evil (1978). Pettet re-emerged as the star of over a dozen television movies, including The Weekend Nun (1972), Footsteps (1972), Pioneer Woman (1973), A Cry in the Wilderness (1974), The Desperate Miles (1975), The Hancocks (1976), Sex and the Married Woman (1977), Cry of the Innocent (1980) with Rod Taylor, and The Return of Frank Cannon (1980).

Also in the 1970s, Pettet guest-starred four times on the classic Rod Serling anthology series Night Gallery, appearing with her then-husband Alex Cord in the episode "Keep in Touch - We'll Think of Something". She also guest-starred in two episodes of the Brian Clemens anthology series Thriller in the UK. Pettet starred in the NBC miniseries Captains and the Kings (1976), starred in the episode "You're Not Alone" from the 1977 NBC anthology series Quinn Martin's Tales of the Unexpected (known in the United Kingdom as Twist in the Tale), was a guest on both Fantasy Island and The Love Boat (appearing three times on each series), and had a recurring role on Knots Landing in 1983 as Janet Baines, an LAPD homicide detective investigating the murder of singer Ciji Dunne (played by Lisa Hartman).

Through the 1970s and 1980s, Pettet made appearances on the television series Harry O, Banacek, McCloud, Mannix, Police Woman, Knight Rider, Tales of the Unexpected (the UK series) and Murder, She Wrote. In 1984, she appeared as herself in a James Bond tribute episode of The Fall Guy with ex-Bond girls Britt Ekland and Lana Wood.

Her final screen role was in the 1991 thriller Terror in Paradise, after which she retired from the screen, still in her 40s.

== Personal life ==
In 1968, Pettet co-starred with Terence Stamp in the Western film Blue, with whom she had a romantic relationship that resulted in the birth of her only child, Damien Zachary Cord. Later that year, she married American actor Alex Cord; the couple subsequently divorced in 1989.

On 8 August 1969, Pettet had lunch at the home of actress Sharon Tate, just hours before the crimes that would be committed at that residence by members of the Manson Family. This event is illustrated in the fictional/alternate-reality 2019 film Once Upon a Time...In Hollywood, in which Pettet is portrayed by Rumer Willis.

Actor Alan Bates bequeathed Pettet £95,000 (equivalent to £173,759 in 2025) upon his death in December 2003. The two had been friends since 1964, and Pettet provided support and companionship during his final months in London after he had been diagnosed with pancreatic cancer in February 2003. Pettet was quoted as saying: "It was a very touching gesture because he had done everything while he was in hospital to make sure I would be looked after following his death."

In August 2021, Pettet became trapped under a boulder for three hours in a high desert area near Anza, California. As a result, she needed surgery to replace her shoulder and rotator cuff.

=== Death ===
Pettet died at Temecula Valley Hospital in Temecula, California, on 7 July 2026, 31 years after the death of her son.

== Recognition ==
Pettet won a Theatre World Award for 1964–1965 for her work in Poor Richard.

== Filmography ==
=== Film ===
Year	Title	Role
1966	The Group	Kay Strong Peterson
1967	The Night of the Generals	Ulrike von Seidlitz-Gabler
1967	Casino Royale	Mata Bond / James Bond
1967	Robbery	Kate Clifton
1968	Blue	Joanne Morton
1969	The Best House in London	Josephine Pacefoot
1974	Welcome to Arrow Beach	Grace Henry
1978	The Evil	Dr. Caroline Arnold
1982	Double Exposure	Mindy Jordache
1982	Black Commando	Desdemona
1987	Sweet Country	Monica
1990	Terror in Paradise	Dr. Fletcher

=== Television ===
Year	Title	Role	Notes
1964	Route 66	Millie Wilkins	"Child of a Night"
1965	The Doctors	Judy Lloyd	"1.481"
1965	The Nurses	Carol Lloyd	"A Dangerous Silence"
1965	The Trials of O'Brien	Liz Martin	"Picture Me a Murder"
1966	The Fugitive	Tina Andresen	"Shadow of a Swan"
1966	A Man Called Shenandoah	Julia Riley	"The Riley Brand"
1966	Dr. Kildare	Yvonne Barlow	Guest role (season 5)
1967	Three for Danger	Serena	TV film
1970	Night Gallery	Elaine Latimer	"The House"
1971	Night Gallery	Claire Foster	"Keep in Touch - We'll Think of Something"
1971	Mannix	Cindy Warren	"A Button for General D."
1972	The Delphi Bureau	April Thompson	"Pilot"
1972	Miss Stewart, Sir	Kate Stewart	TV film
1972	The Weekend Nun	Sister Mary Damian/Marjorie Walker	ABC Movie of the Week
1972	Banacek	Christine Verdon	"Project Phoenix"
1972	Footsteps	Sarah Allison	TV film
1972	Night Gallery	Rhona Warwick / The Girl with the Hungry Eyes	"The Caterpillar", "The Girl with the Hungry Eyes"
1973	McCloud	Melissa Thompson	"The Solid Gold Swingers"
1973	Pioneer Woman	Maggie Sergeant	TV film
1974	Medical Center	Molly	"Girl from Bedlam"
1974	A Cry in the Wilderness	Delda Hadley	TV film
1974	Police Story	Adria	"Glamour Boy"
1974–75	Thriller	Sylvia Dee / Jody Baxter	"A Killer in Every Corner", "A Midsummer Nightmare"
1974–75	Harry O	Glenna Nielson / Breda Beach	"Forty Reasons to Kill: Parts 1 & 2", "Group Terror"
1975	Caribe	Andrea	"Vanished"
1975	The Desperate Miles	Ruth Merrick	TV film
1975	Police Woman	Glenna Burns / Beth Lord	"Silence"
1976	The Dark Side of Innocence	Jesse Breton	TV film
1976	Captains and the Kings	Katherine Hennessey	TV miniseries
1977	Quinn Martin's Tales of the Unexpected	Julie Thomas	"You're Not Alone"
1977	Sex and the Married Woman	Leslie Fitch	TV film
1979	Heaven Only Knows	Lynn Harpster	TV film
1979–82	The Love Boat	Carol Hanson / Angelina Blenderman / Lenore Pitchford	3 episodes
1980	Charlie's Angels	Barbara Brown	"Nips and Tucks"
1980	Cry of the Innocent	Cynthia Donegin / Candia Leighton	TV film
1980	The Return of Frank Cannon	Alana Richardson	TV film
1980–83	Fantasy Island	Nona Lauren / Celeste Vallon / Vanessa Walgren	3 episodes
1981	Aloha Paradise	Fiona	2 episodes
1981	Tales of the Unexpected	Betsy	"A Glowing Future"
1982	The Littlest Hobo	Cynthia Masters	"Forget Me Not"
1982	Seven Brides for Seven Brothers	Meg Palmer	"Christmas Song"
1983	Knots Landing	Det. Janet Baines	Recurring role
1984	The Yellow Rose	Lane Roberts	"Running Free"
1984	Knight Rider	Joanna St. John	"Mouth of the Snake"
1984	The Fall Guy	Herself	"Always Say Always"
1984	Finder of Lost Loves	Claire Hardy	"Undying Love"
1984–85	Hotel	Lauren Chapman / Sally Banks	"Reflections", "Lost and Found"
1987	Murder, She Wrote	Virginia McCormack	"The Way to Dusty Death"
1989	ABC Afterschool Special	Carolyn Adams	"Just Tipsy, Honey"
