= California Artists Radio Theatre =

American theater company

- Formation: 1984
- Type: Theatre group
- Purpose: Radio drama
- Location: 4222 Vineland Ave. North Hollywood, CA 91602
- Artistic director: Peggy Webber
- Award: Pacific Pioneer Broadcasters Award
- Website: www.cartradio.com

California Artists Radio Theatre also known as "CART" was founded in 1984 by Peggy Webber with the intent of reviving the medium radio drama, and "to encourage young people to enjoy the art of spoken word."

== History ==
In the 1980s CART radio shows were broadcast over KUSC where, after the first production of Treasure Island, hundreds of callers contacted the station requesting more content.

From 1990 onwards, CART broadcast history includes local distribution from various Los Angeles radio stations, including KUSC, KPCC, and KPFK; national distribution of over one hundred programs on NPR, and international distribution through World Space to regions in Africa, South America, and Asia. CART's archival productions are currently broadcast around the world on SiriusXM Satellite Radio.

For more than 30 years, radio personality John Harlan served as the company's resident announcer.

== Past ensemble members ==
- Ian Abercrombie
- John Astin
- Rene Auberjonois
- Parley Baer
- Richard Crenna
- Nancy Cartwright
- Abbie Cobb
- Tommy Cook
- Royal Dano
- Elizabeth Dennehy
- Peter Dennis
- Bairbre Dowling
- Shay Duffin
- Leslie Easterbrook
- Beverly Garland
- Samantha Eggar
- Richard Erdman
- Joe Flood
- Kathleen Freeman
- Kay E. Kuter
- Linda Kaye Henning
- Richard Herd
- Marvin Kaplan
- James Lancaster
- John Rafter Lee
- Norman Lloyd
- Shelley Long
- Thomas MacGreevy
- Leonard Maltin
- Monte Markham
- Sean McClory
- Roddy McDowall
- Colm Meaney
- Edward Mulhare
- Lois Nettleton
- Jeanette Nolan
- Dan O'Herlihy
- David Warner
- Phil Proctor
- Ford Rainey
- Elliott Reid
- Robert Rockwell
- John Saxon
- Simon Templeman
- Les Tremayne
- Janet Waldo
- David Warner
- Peggy Webber
- James Whitmore
- William Windom
- William Woodson
- JoAnne Worley
- H.M. Wynant
- Michael York

== Archival recordings ==
- Alice in Wonderland
- Ann Rutledge
- The Assassination of Abraham Lincoln
- Billie Bonnie: Bloodletter
- Blackbeard's 14th Wife: Why She was No Good For Him
- The Bloody Bloody Banks of Fall River
- Bridgit of Kildare
- Call of the Yukon
- Candida
- Christmas in Spiddal
- Christmas with CART
- The Crime of Bathsheba Spooner
- Curtain Calls
- The Dubliners
- Discovery
- Edwin Booth
- Felix & Fanny
- The Final Day of General Ketchum, and How He
- Died
- First Love
- Four Last Songs
- Francisco Pizarro: His Heart on a Golden Knife
- Getting Married
- Good Evening, My Name is Jack the Ripper
- A Good House for a Killing
- Hamilton & Burr
- Hobson's Choice
- An Ideal Husband
- If a Body Need a Body, Just Call Burke & Hare
- The Importance of Being Earnest
- The Inca of Perusalem
- Jane Eyre
- Joy to the World
- Letters and Other Beguiling Things
- Lincoln: A Tribute
- Little Women - Book 1
- Little Women - Book 2
- Lotus Land
- The Lost Letters of Robert E. Lee
- Macbeth
- Major Barbara
- The Man with Bogart's Face
- Mary and the Fairy
- Mary, Queen of Scots
- Mates
- A Midsummer Night's Dream
- Murder in Studio One
- The Music Cure
- My Client Curley
- Mysteries in the Air
- Norman Corwin's 100th Birthday Tribute
- Oh, Shaw
- Old Six Toes
- One Perfect Rose
- Oscar in Limbo
- Our Lady of the Freedoms
- Peter Pan & Wendy
- The Playboy of the Western World
- The Plot to Overthrow Christmas
- Reno
- The Seagull
- Selecting a Ghost
- Seeds of the Abbey
- The Seven-Layer Arsenic Cake of Madame LeFarge
- Shadow and Substance
- She Stoops to Conquer
- Sherlock Holmes
- Sid
- The Strange Affliction
- A Stroll with Poets
- The Three Actors
- Twelfth Night
- Treasure Island
- The Upstart Crow
- Walt Whitman: Sweet Bird of Freedom
- Where She Stops, Nobody Knows
- Widow McGee and the Three Gypsies
- The Wonderful Wizard of Oz
- The World and His Wife
- Yankee Doodle Dandies
- Your Loving Son, Nero
