= James N. Healy =

Irish actor, writer, and theatre producer

James N. Healy (1916–1993) was an Irish actor, writer and theatre producer.

== Biography ==
Healy was born in County Cork. In his youth he had participated in Amateur theatricals. Until 1958 he was an accountant, but turned to acting to make a living when the company for which he worked failed. With two partners he founded the Southern Theatre Group in Cork. They had great success with Sive (by John B. Keane) in 1959, and went on to produce such plays as Many Young Men of Twenty, The Man from Clare, the Year of the Hiker. He was later a founder member of the Gilbert and Sullivan Group, with which he worked for several years.

Healy had always been a collector of songs and ballads and appeared on several radio programs singing these, such as the Real Blarney and Melodymakers. He has published many books of Irish ballads.

== Archive ==
A collection of photographs, posters and programmes from the theatre archive of James N. Healy was donated to Cork Library in 2012.

== Bibliography ==
- Ballads from the Pubs of Ireland 1965 Mercier Press
- Irish ballads and songs of the sea 1967 Mercier Press
- The second book of Irish ballads 1962 Mercier Press
- The Mercier book of old Irish street ballads
- The Mercier book of old Irish street ballads. Vol. II
- The Mercier book of old Irish street ballads. Vol. III 1969 Mercier Press
- The Mercier book of old Irish street ballads. Vol. IV
- The Castles of County Cork
- Love Songs of the Irish
- Jokes from the pubs of Ireland
- Percy French and his songs 1966 Mercier Press
- Comic Irish recitations
- Ballads From an Irish Fireside
- Comic Songs of Cork and Kerry
