= A Cry in the Wilderness =

- VHS cover art
- Genre: Thriller
- Written by: Stephen Karpf; Elinor Karpf
- Story by: Gilbert Wright
- Directed by: Gordon Hessler
- Starring: George Kennedy; Joanna Pettet
- Music by: Robert Prince
- Country of origin: United States
- Original language: English

Production
- Producer: Lou Morheim
- Cinematography: Harry L. Wolf
- Editor: Bud Hoffman
- Running time: 74 mins
- Production company: Universal Television

Original release
- Network: ABC
- Release: March 26, 1974

A Cry in the Wilderness is a 1974 American TV film directed by Gordon Hessler.

== Plot ==
The father of a wilderness family gets bitten by a skunk, and fearing rabies, chains himself to a barn to protect his family should he go mad. He orders his son not to come near him no matter how persuasive or rational his appearance or argument. However, the creek dries up, indicating an upstream blockage and an imminent flood. Several trips upstream by the son have failed to locate the blockage, and now Dad wants to be released. The boy needs to decide if his father is telling the truth or his fear of the flood is due to hydrophobia—one of the symptoms of rabies.

== Cast ==
- George Kennedy as Sam Hadley
- Joanna Pettet as Delda Hadley
- Lee Montgomery as Gus Hadley (as Lee H. Montgomery)
- Collin Wilcox-Horne as Bess Millard
- Liam Dunn as Mr. Hainie
- Bing Russell as Mr. Griffey
- Robert Brubaker as Doctor
- Anne Seymour as Sam's Grandmother
- Irene Tedrow as Old Woman
