= Lehigh Valley Railroad Barge No. 79 =

- U.S. National Register of Historic Places
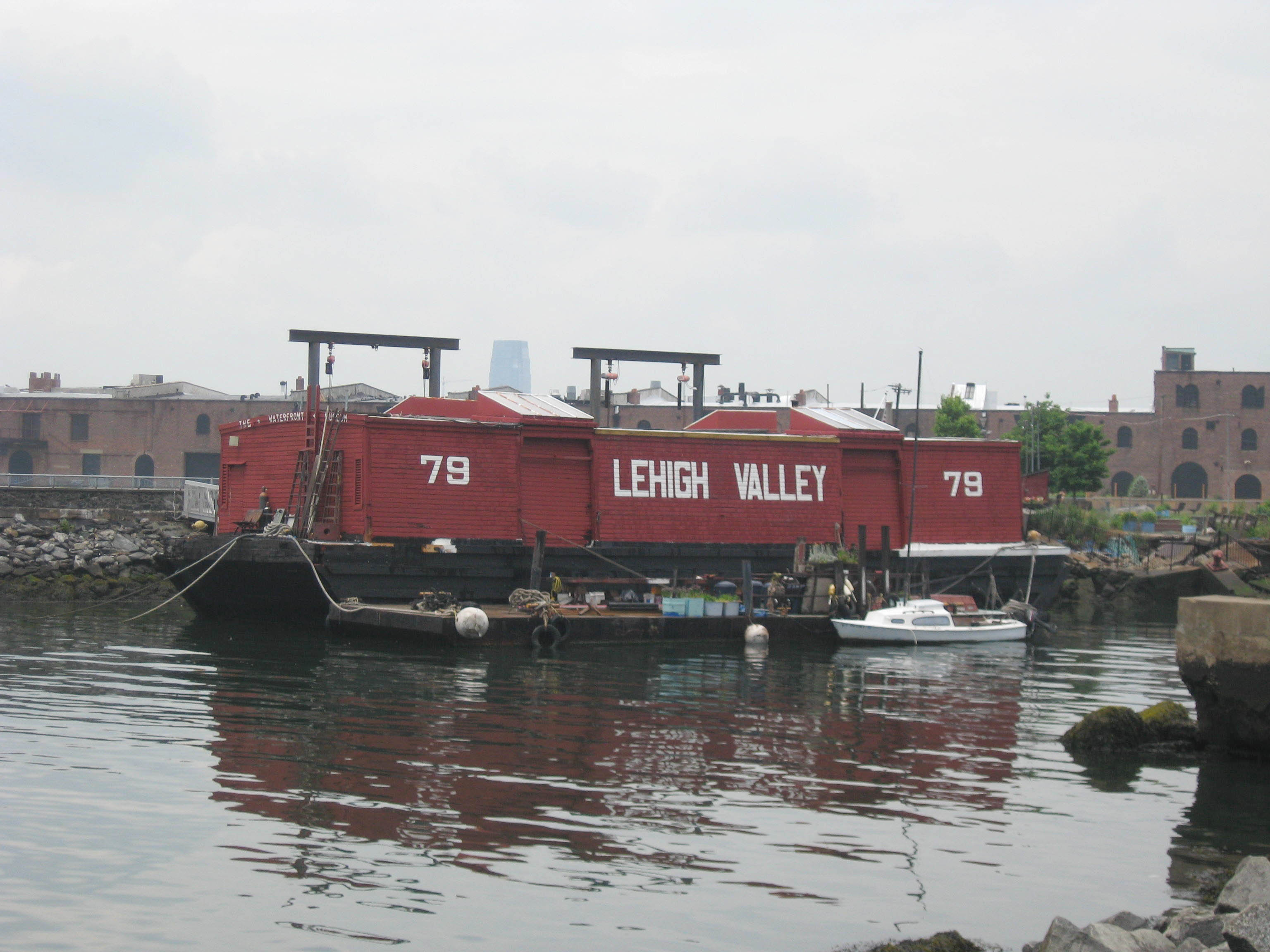
- Lehigh Valley Railroad Barge No. 79, June 2008

- Location within New York City Location within New York Location within the United States
- Location: 290 Conover St., Brooklyn, New York
- Coordinates: 40°40′31″N 74°01′11″W
- Area: Less than 1.03 acres (0.42 ha)
- Built: 1914
- Built by: Lehigh Valley Railroad
- NRHP reference No.: 15000309
- Added to NRHP: June 2, 2015

Lehigh Valley Railroad Barge No. 79 is a historic barge located at The Waterfront Museum in the Red Hook neighborhood of Brooklyn, Kings County, New York. The barge was built in 1914 in Perth Amboy, New Jersey, as part of the lighter fleet operated by the Lehigh Valley Railroad to move cargoes around New York Harbor and along the lower Hudson River. It has a length on deck of 86 feet, beam of 30 feet, and draft of 2 feet, 9 inches.

It was listed on the National Register of Historic Places in 2015. Lehigh Valley Railroad Barge 79 was previously listed on the National Register in 1989 at a berth in New Jersey.
