= Chester Theatre Company =

Summer theatre company in Massachusetts, US

Chester Theatre Company (CTC) is a professional summer theatre company in Chester, Massachusetts. CTC performances take place in the Chester Town Hall, which seat approximately 130 guests. CTC also operates several community-based educational programs in Western Massachusetts.

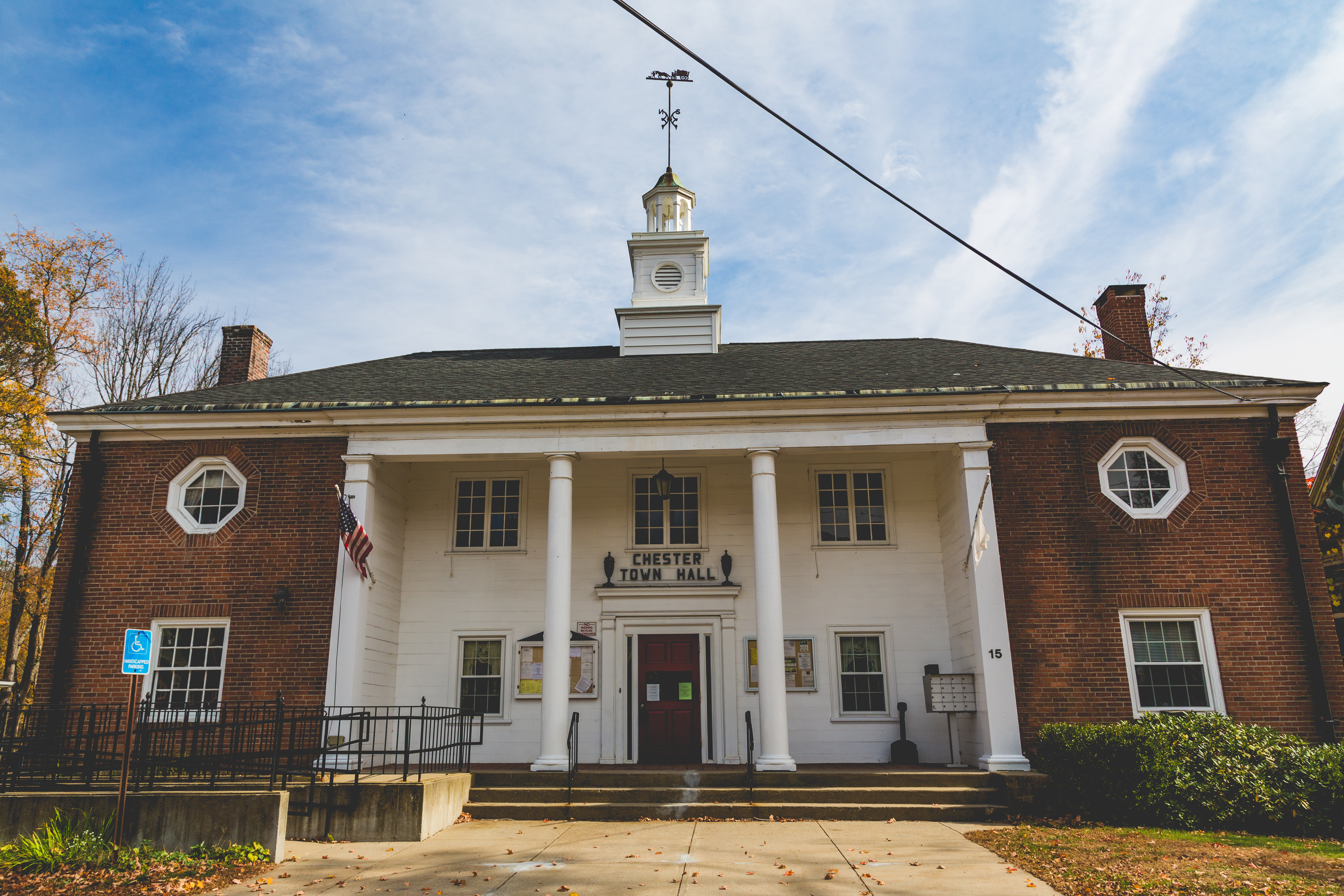
Photograph of Chester Town Hall

CTC has earned a reputation for producing "some of the most adventurous programming in the area," according to a 2018 article in The New Yorker.

== Leadership ==
CTC was founded in 1990 by Vincent Dowling and H. Newman Marsh as the "Miniature Theatre of Chester."

From 1997 to 2015, Byam Stevens served as artistic director of CTC. Stevens led CTC through a lack of outside funding due to the Great Recession. He helped CTC transition from the Chester Miniature Theatre Company to a company focused on contemporary theater. "(Theatre) should address the lasting questions of life, and it should serve as a forum for us to address the important issues that are facing us as a society in the present."

In 2015, Daniel Elihu Kramee became the artistic director of CTC . Kramer has been focusing on language-driven pieces with small casts, Under Kramer, CTC has been working to expand the internship program.

In 2019, Tara Franklin became the Director of Education. CTC has created and run a number of education and outreach programs.

=== Post-show discussions ===
CTC is known for a range of post-show discussions following the majority of its performances. These conversations are an essential part of CTC's education programs.

=== Theatre Trips ===
CTC brings audience members on theatre tours to London, and to North American locations, including Chicago, Washington, DC, and Toronto and Stratford, Ontario.

=== The Gateway and Camp Shepard Playwrighting Projects ===
Starting in 2005, CTC paired with Gateway Regional Middle School in Huntington, Massachusetts, to help young people write a produce their own work.

CTC produces a series of ten-minute plays written by the students, complete with professional designers, directors, and actors. They also helped teach the students during an 8-week after-school writing course and weekend retreat.

The Camp Shepard Project was a similar collaboration between CTC, Westfield State College, and the Westfield YMCA. Westfield State College provided actors and designers, while directors from CTC acted as mentors to the young writers. The program was designed for students in 6-8th grade. The course took place at the Westfield YMCA.

== Notable productions ==
- Pride@Prejudice - Written by Daniel Elihu Kramer, 2011 season.
- The Darlings - Byam Stevens directed the world premiere of this play in 2002. This is a satirical and modern interpretation of the classic family portrayed in Peter Pan.
- Arms on Fire - CTC also showed the word premiere of this play in 2013, by Steven Sater and Duncan Sheik.
