= The Long Journey Home (1987 film) =

- Genre: Drama
- Written by: Karen Clark
- Directed by: Rod Holcomb
- Starring: Meredith Baxter; David Birney; Ray Baker
- Music by: J.A.C. Redford
- Country of origin: United States
- Original language: English

Production
- Executive producer: Andrea Baynes
- Producer: Ervin Zavada
- Cinematography: Edmond L. Koons
- Editor: Christopher Nelson
- Running time: 96 minutes
- Production companies: Andrea Baynes Productions; Grail Productions; Lorimar-Telepictures

Original release
- Network: CBS
- Release: November 29, 1987

The Long Journey Home is a 1987 American drama television film starring Meredith Baxter and David Birney (then married to each other), and directed by Rod Holcomb.

It aired on CBS as one of their Sunday Movies, on November 29, 1987, and was the fourth most-watched show in the United States for the week, with 18.9 million homes viewing.
