= Ciara Elizabeth Smyth =

Irish playwright and director

Ciara Elizabeth Smyth is an Irish playwright and director.

== Writing ==
- 2015: Pour it out., Smock Alley Theatre
- 2016: TRIANGLES, Smock Alley Theatre, Nuns Island Theatre (Galway) and the International Bar
- 2016: All honey, The New Theatre
- 2017: All honey, Dublin Fringe Festival - Winner Fishamble New Writing Award
- 2018: All honey, Bewley's Cafe Theatre Powerscourt
- 2018: We Can't Have Monkeys in the House, The New Theatre
- 2019: Mouth of the Grand Canal, The National Gallery of Ireland
- 2019: We Can't Have Monkeys in the House, Peacock Theatre
- 2019: SAUCE, Dublin Fringe Festival
- 2020: All honey, Project Arts Centre
- 2020: Party Party, Dear Ireland, Abbey Theatre
- 2020: Wild Horses, Tiny Plays 24/7, Fishamble: The New Play Company
- 2023/24: Lie Low (or Paranotica), Royal Court Theatre, Abbey Theatre and Traverse Theatre – longlisted for BBC Popcorn Award for New Writing 2023
