= Waterfront Museum =

Museum in Brooklyn, New York; former barge

Coordinates: 40°40′30.85″N 74°1′6″W

The Waterfront Museum was formerly Lehigh Valley Barge No. 79, a Lehigh Valley Railroad barge that moved goods across the Hudson River. It dates to 1914 and is believed to be the only all-wooden Hudson River railroad barge still afloat.

It is currently docked and operated as a museum at the foot of Conover Street in Brooklyn's Red Hook neighborhood where it provides a range of educational and entertainment programming. It was also the location for the US premiere of Arthur Miller's The Hook.

The museum was established in 1985 following the restoration project by founder and juggler David Sharps. He subsequently relocated the barge to Red Hook where it has remained since 1994. He continued to serve as President through the museum's first twenty-five years of operation.

== See also ==
- List of maritime museums in the United States
