= Cort Library =

Majorcan public library

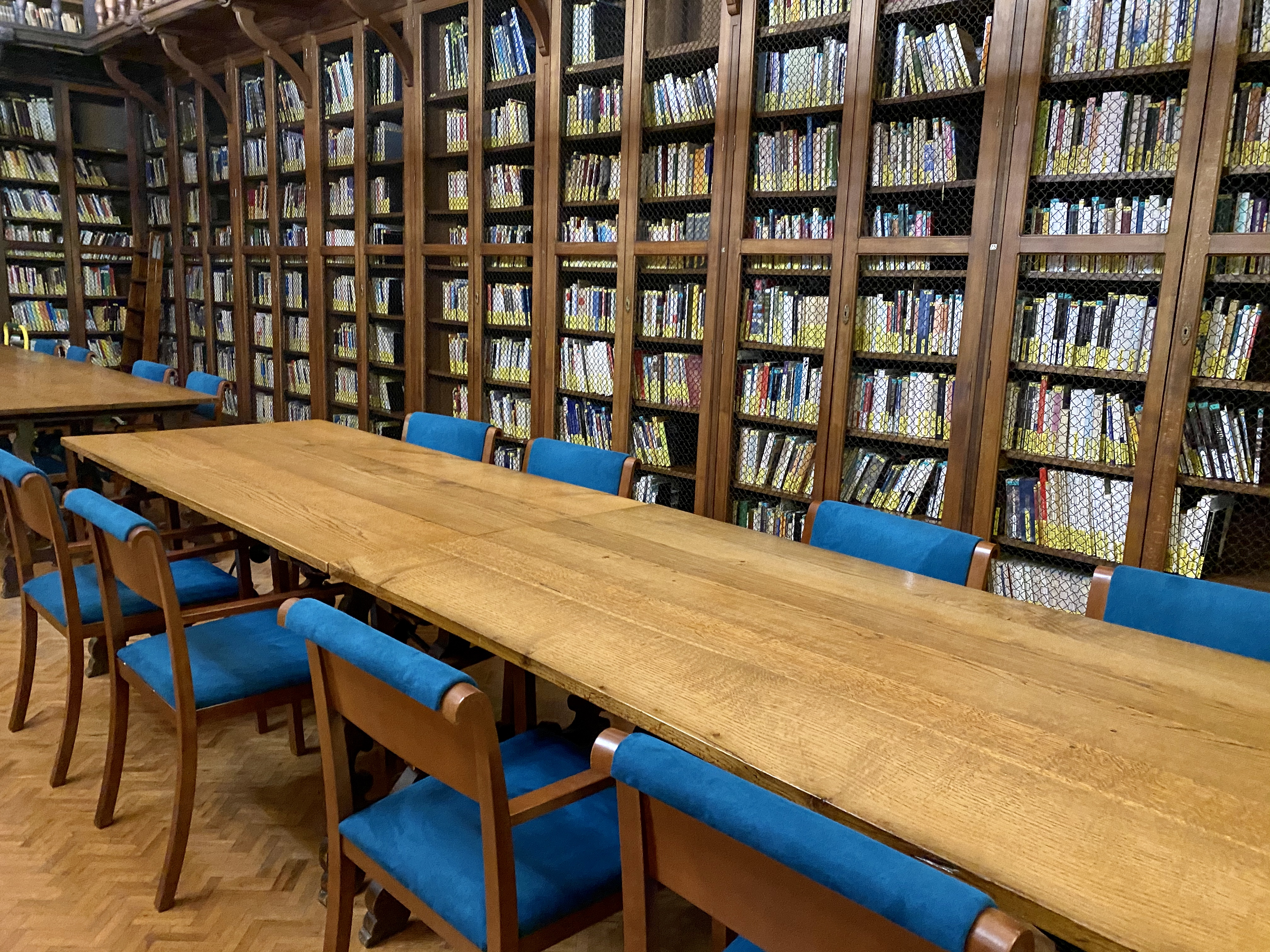
- Palma
- 39.5694°N 2.6502°E
- Type: Public library
- Established: September 13, 1935

Collection
- Size: 20,556 items

Other information
- Website: Official website

The Cort Library is a public library in Palma de Mallorca, Balearic Islands, Spain. It is the oldest of Palma's local libraries, and it is located inside Palma's town council building, in Cort square, 1. At present, it is part of the Bibliopalma library network. Its collection can be consulted online through the Bibliographic Catalogue of the Balearic Islands. The library also organises regular exhibitions, presentations, conferences, and reading clubs.

== History ==
During the Second Spanish Republic, in June 1931, the Culture Commission, presided by Emili Darder, was created, when the bases for the creation of the Cort Library were being put in place. This Commission supervised the entire process of the naming of the first librarian, the acquisition of books and subscriptions to magazines, as well as the reform and reconditioning of the space. The first director was Martina Pascual, appointed in 1931, who was a pioneer in the Balearic Islands. She studied at the Graduate School for Women Librarians of the Commonwealth of Catalonia. She applied both technical and professional criteria to the Cort Library. Furthermore, she was also the person who started the policy of it having a specialised local collection, which lasts to this day.

The library opened on the 19th of September 1935, becoming Palma's first local library. The collection was made up of 7,000 volumes, in part from the collections of Antoni Villalonga i Pérez, a peculiar nobleman that stands out for being a supporter of federal republicanism, and Jaume Garau i Montaner, which had been bought by the town council 30 years prior. You can also find old, rare, and precious books in their designated section. The oldest dates back to 1521, and it's a work by Ramon Llull, Blanquerna. Presently, the library is made up of 20,000 volumes, 40 reading spots, and 39,000 users. Its specialised local collection about the city of Palma is made up of important monographs, brochures, and periodicals.

As a popular library, and to promote culture, a children's section and a branch in Soledat School were created. In 1961 a bookmobile to loan books and comics in different neighbourhoods was started. It had a daily route through these neighbourhoods and every 15 days it visited learning centers, schools, parish schools, and private schools. It was a loan service with a starting collection of 2,500 books managed by the Cort Library. This bibliobus ran until 1977 when new library services and the development of a library web started being drafted.^{[cal citació]} During World Book Day of 1993, one of the most important services started running: the loan section.

== Building ==
The Cort library is located on the ground floor of the main building of Palma's town council. It fell into disrepair until in 1892, a deep remodeling process was started by the local architect Manuel Chapuli. During this remodeling, in February 1894, a fire that extended through the whole building destroyed it completely. The ground floor had to be completely remodeled. The Cort library was born from this new set-up.

The library was built from 1904 to 1927, when the architect in charge was Gaspar Bennàzar; Chapulí had resigned in 1895. At that moment Gaspar Bennàzar was the sole person in charge of building the new hall and the main staircase and as such, it is fitting to also attribute him the authorship of the library.

The room is made up of a big wooden bookcase that surrounds the whole space. This two-stories bookcase is divided by an overhung gateway supported by corbels carved into zoomorphic shapes, possibly inspired by the Montisió library.
