= Vincent Dowling =

Irish actor and director (1929–2013)

- Born: Vincent Gerard Dowling; 7 September 1929; Dublin, Ireland
- Died: 9 May 2013 (aged 83); Boston, Massachusetts, U.S.
- Occupations: Actor, director
- Years active: 1950–2013
- Spouses: Brenda Doyle (m. 1952; div. 1975) Olwen O'Herlihy (m. 1975)
- Children: 6, including Bairbre Dowling and Richard Boyd Barrett
- Awards: Emmy Award (1983)

Vincent Gerard Dowling (/ˈvɪnsənt/; Irish: Uinseann Gearóid Ó Dúnlaing; 7 September 1929 – 9 May 2013) was an Irish actor and director. Throughout his career, he served as Artistic Director of the National Theatre of Ireland, the Great Lakes Shakespeare Festival, and Chester Theatre Company.

In 1981, he received a Emmy Award for his television film adaptation of J. M. Synge’s The Playboy of the Western World on PBS, starring his daughter Bairbre Dowling. As an actor and director, Dowling worked on over 100 productions with the Abbey Theatre in Dublin. He received four honorary Doctorate of Letters from John Carroll University, Kent State University, Westfield State University, and the College of Wooster, for contributions to Irish and American drama. Dowling was an early career mentor to Academy Award winning actor, Tom Hanks.

== Ireland ==
Dowling was born in Dublin and educated at St Mary's College, Dublin and Rathmines College of Commerce. He came to prominence in the 1950s for his role as Christy Kennedy in the long-running radio soap opera, The Kennedys of Castleross and as a member of the Abbey Theatre company. He returned to the Abbey as artistic director from 1987 to 1990.

== United States ==
Dowling emigrated to the United States in the 1970s, and served as artistic director of the Great Lakes Shakespeare Festival (GLSF) in Cleveland, Ohio from 1976 to 1984, where he directed, produced and acted in many classical works, by Shakespeare and others. He is credited with discovering actor Tom Hanks. Dowling received an Ohio Valley local Emmy for the 1983 PBS broadcast of his 1982 GLSF production of The Playboy of the Western World.

He was visiting professor at The College of Wooster in Ohio during the 1986-87 academic year. He founded the Miniature Theatre of Chester (now the Chester Theatre Company), in Chester, Massachusetts, in 1990.

== Personal life ==
Dowling married actress Brenda Doyle in 1952; they had four daughters, including actress Bairbre Dowling, before divorcing in 1975. In 1975, Dowling married Olwen O'Herlihy, with whom he had a son.

Politician Richard Boyd Barrett is the biological son of Dowling and recording artist and actress Sinéad Cusack from a 1966 relationship while both were at the Abbey Theatre; Boyd Barrett was adopted as an infant. Dowling contacted Boyd Barrett after his connection with Cusack was publicly revealed in 2007. Their relationship was made known after his death in 2013.

Dowling published an autobiography in 2000. His papers, from 1976 onward, are housed at the Kent State University and John Carroll University libraries.

== Selected filmography ==
- My Wife's Lodger (1952)
