= Carey Perloff =

American dramatist

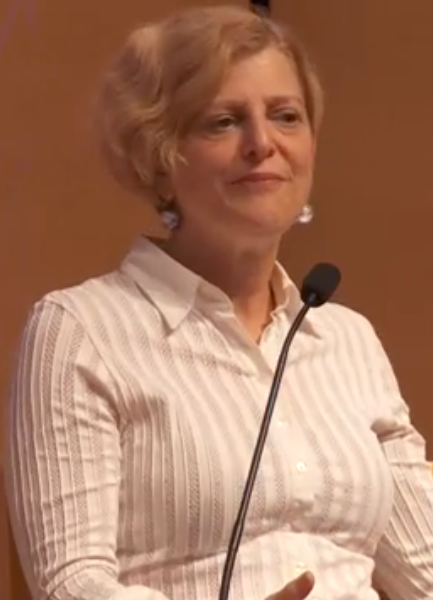
- In a discussion at the San Francisco Public Library in 2016
- Born: Carey Elizabeth Perloff; February 9, 1959 (age 67); Washington, D.C., U.S.
- Education: Stanford University, Oxford University (St. Anne's College)
- Occupations: Director, playwright, educator, author
- Spouse: Anthony Giles
- Children: Alexandra Perloff-Giles, Nicholas Perloff-Giles (music producer, DJ "Wingtip")
- Parent(s): Marjorie Perloff (professor and poetry critic) and Joseph Perloff (physician)

Carey Elizabeth Perloff (born February 9, 1959) is an American theater director, playwright, author, and educator. She was the artistic director of American Conservatory Theater (A.C.T.) in San Francisco from 1992 to June 2018.

== Early life and education ==
Perloff was born in Washington, D.C. to Jewish parents Marjorie Perloff, a professor and poetry critic, and Joseph K. Perloff, a professor of medicine and pediatrics and cardiologist. She attended Stanford University, where she received a B.A., Phi Beta Kappa, in classics and comparative literature. After graduating from Stanford in 1980, Perloff attended St. Anne's College, University of Oxford, as a Fulbright Fellow and spent two summers directing at the Edinburgh Festival, where she met her husband, attorney Anthony Giles.

== Professional career ==
Perloff worked as an administrator at the International Theater Institute, then as a casting assistant with Joseph Papp's Public Theater, while launching her directing career off-off Broadway. In 1986, she was named artistic director of the Off-Broadway Classic Stage Company (CSC), where she was artistic director from 1986-1992 until becoming the artistic director of A.C.T. in 1992.

At CSC, Perloff directed the world premiere of Ezra Pound's Elektra, the American premiere of Harold Pinter's Mountain Language, and many classic works. Under her leadership, CSC won numerous OBIE Awards, including the 1988 OBIE for artistic excellence. She served on the faculty of the Tisch School of the Arts at New York University for seven years.

In 1993, Perloff directed the world premiere of Steve Reich and Beryl Korot's opera The Cave at the Vienna Festival and Brooklyn Academy of Music. She has also directed a new Elektra, adapted by Timberlake Wertenbaker, for the Getty Villa in Los Angeles in 2010.

Since 2018, Perloff has worked as a freelance artist across America, staging the first American production of The Lehman Trilogy at the Huntington Theater and the Repertory Theater of St. Louis (Best Director Award) and the first American production of Tom Stoppard's Leopoldstadt at the Huntington and the Shakespeare Theater, DC. For her direction of Leopoldstadt, Perloff received the Elliot Norton Award for Best Director. She also staged Hend Ayoub's HOME? in San Francisco and New York, Granville-Barker's Waste and Chekhov's The Cherry Orchard at Marin Theater. Her play If God Were Blue was developed at the Colorado New Play Summit in Denver in 2025 and her play Vienna, Vienna, Vienna will be produced in the Twin Cities at Six Point Theater in April 2026.

Perloff has continued her explorations of classical Greek plays with her adaptation of Oedipus Tyrannos/Oedipus at Colonus workshopped at Red Bull Theater in NYC starring John Douglas Thompson and Nike Imoru. Carey Perloff currently teaches Directing in the MFA Program at Columbia University.

== American Conservatory Theater ==
In 1992, Perloff was appointed artistic director of A.C.T., where her first task was to raise $31 million to rebuild the earthquake-damaged Geary Theater (now the American Conservatory Theater), which reopened in January 1996 with Perloff's production of The Tempest, starring David Strathairn. Perloff's tenure at A.C.T. included the creation of a new core company of actors; revitalization of the acclaimed A.C.T. Master of Fine Arts Program; receipt of the 1996 Jujamcyn Theaters Award, honoring A.C.T.'s efforts to develop creative talent for the theater; a series of international collaborations, including The Virtual Stage and Electric Company Theatre's multi-media adaptation of Jean-Paul Sartre's No Exit, Robert Wilson and Tom Waits' The Black Rider, Morris Panych and Wendy Gorling's The Overcoat, and Kneehigh Theatre's Brief Encounter; and the American premieres of plays by Tom Stoppard and Harold Pinter.

Perloff's directorial work for A.C.T. includes: The Tosca Project (co-created with choreographer Val Caniparoli; world premiere), Phèdre, Boleros for the Disenchanted, Rock 'n' Roll, 'Tis Pity She's a Whore, The Government Inspector, After the War (world premiere), Travesties, Happy End, A Christmas Carol (co-adapted with Paul Walsh; world premiere), The Voysey Inheritance (adapted by David Mamet; world premiere), The Real Thing, A Mother, A Doll's House, Waiting for Godot, The Three Sisters, Night and Day, For the Pleasure of Seeing Her Again, The Difficulty of Crossing a Field (world premiere), Celebration (world premiere), The Room, Enrico IV, The Misanthrope, The Invention of Love (American premiere), The Threepenny Opera, Indian Ink (American premiere), Old Times, Mary Stuart, Singer's Boy (world premiere), The Rose Tattoo, The Tempest, Arcadia, Hecuba, Home, Uncle Vanya, Antigone, Bon Appétit, Creditors, Hilda, No for an Answer (world premiere), her own play The Colossus of Rhodes, Harold Pinter's The Homecoming and James Fenton's adaptation of The Orphan of Zhao, starring BD Wong.

In June 2018, after the A.C.T. 2017-2018 season concluded, Perloff left A.C.T. to pursue her freelance directing and writing career. Pam MacKinnon became the next artistic director of A.C.T.

== The Strand ==
In addition to her work at the main A.C.T. theater on Geary Street (and formerly known as "The Geary Theater"), Carey Perloff raised 30 million dollars to reinvigorate a theater on Market Street that had been built in 1917 and had many lives, including prior to being shut down as a porn theater. The plan of recreating the Strand was complementary to the A.C.T. mission, in that it could accommodate different types and sizes of plays and performances with greater flexibility than the large theater with its over 1,000 seats.

== Plays ==
Perloff has written several plays that have achieved international acclaim. Perloff's play The Colossus of Rhodes, which premiered at the White Barn Theatre in Westport, CT, in 2001, was a Susan Smith Blackburn Award finalist.

Her play Luminescence Dating premiered in New York at The Ensemble Studio Theatre in 2005; it was coproduced by A.C.T. and Magic Theatre. Her play Waiting for the Flood has received workshops at A.C.T. (2006), New York Stage and Film, and Roundabout Theatre Company.

Her one-act The Morning After was a finalist for the Heideman Award at Actors Theatre of Louisville. Perloff's play, Higher, was developed at New York Stage and Film and was presented at San Francisco's Contemporary Jewish Museum in November 2010.

Her play Kinship was translated into French and performed in Paris in 2014, with Isabelle Adjani, making her return to the theater after a long absence, in the starring role. In a later rendition in 2015, at the Williamstown Theater Festival, Cynthia Nixon starred in Kinship.

Perloff wrote Bastiano or The Art of Rivalry during a residency at the Bogliasco Foundation in 2019, and Edgardo or White Fire as a commission from the WIlliamstown Theater Festival in 2020.

== Honors ==
Perloff is a recipient of France's Chevalier de l'Ordre des Arts et des Lettres and the National Corporate Theatre Fund's 2007 Artistic Achievement Award. In 2011 Perloff won the Blanche and Irving Laurie Theater Visions Award for her play Higher.

In 2019, Perloff was awarded the San Diego Theatre Critics Circle Craig Noel Award for Outstanding Dramatic Production, Direction, Lighting and Scenic Design for the Old Globe's production of "A Thousand Splendid Suns." Perloff commissioned the adaptation of this work, written by Khaled Hosseini, for her 25th season as A.C.T. director and it received critical acclaim both during its initial run in San Francisco, and in subsequent runs in Seattle and San Diego.

== Writing ==
Carey Perloff has written several books focused on discussion or analysis of specific plays. Her book on her experience as a theater director and the challenges of raising a family with the "challenges confronting the American theater," Beautiful Chaos: A Life in the Theater, was published by City Lights in 2015. The book was critically acclaimed, with reviews by Tom Stoppard, Khaled Hosseini, and Armistead Maupin. Martin David's review in the New York Journal of Books praised Perloff's contribution to San Francisco's theater scene, which was chronicled through the book in her anecdotes of building A.C.T. after the 1989 earthquake reduced it to rubble. David stated that "Carey Perloff's leadership of American Conservatory Theater is one of the reasons San Francisco remains a respected center of the art form in our country.

In 2022, Perloff's book Pinter and Stoppard, A Director's View was published by Methuen Drama. In this work, Perloff discusses her decades-long experiences of working closely with these renowned contemporary playwrights, having directed five Pinter plays and eleven Stoppard plays.

== Personal life ==
Perloff makes her home in San Francisco. She is the mother of two children, Alexandra Perloff-Giles and Nicholas Perloff-Giles, also known as the producer and songwriter "Wingtip."
