= Great Lakes Theater =

Theater company in Cleveland, Ohio, U.S.

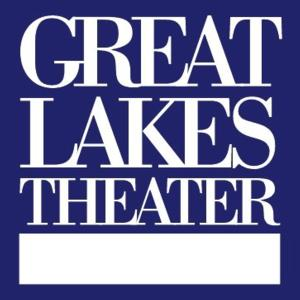
- Formation: 1962
- Type: Theatre group
- Location(s): Hanna Theatre and Ohio Theatre Cleveland, Ohio
- Artistic director: Sara Bruner
- Website: www.greatlakestheater.org

Great Lakes Theater, originally known as the Great Lakes Shakespeare Festival, is a professional classic theater company in Cleveland, Ohio, United States. Founded in 1962, Great Lakes specializes in large-cast classic plays, often performing the works of Shakespeare. The company performs its main stage productions in rotating repertory at the Hanna Theatre in Playhouse Square, which reopened in 2008. The organization shares a resident company of artists with the Idaho Shakespeare Festival. On its main stage and through its education programs, GLT reaches approximately 85,000 adults and students each season.

GLT's artistic directors have included Arthur Lithgow, Lawrence Carra, Vincent Dowling, and Gerald Freedman.

== Origins ==
A professional regional theater, The Great Lakes Shakespeare Festival (GLTF), was launched in 1962 with a $50,000 budget (equivalent to US$532,178 in 2025). Supported by community members and volunteers at its inception, the theater continues to operate as a non-profit with a $3.6 million annual operations budget.

Later to become the first GLTF director, Arthur Lithgow directed Shakespeare Under the Stars, a professional summer theater troupe at Antioch College where he was a faculty member. Between 1952 and 1957, the troupe performed all of Shakespeare’s plays and began traveling across Northeastern Ohio to perform at Stan Hywet Hall in Akron, in a movie theater in Cuyahoga Falls, and at the Toledo Zoo. By 1962, the troupe was seeking a space to perform permanently while, simultaneously, a group of citizens led by the Lakewood Board of Education president, Dorothy Teare, were seeking cultural activities to occupy the Lakewood Civic Auditorium during the summer months. Thus, the Great Lakes Shakespeare Festival formed and premiered the first production, As You Like It, on July 11, 1962. It continued at the Lakewood Civic Auditorium that season and performed six Shakespeare plays in rotation.

== Notable moments ==
The theater had begun with performing exclusively Shakespeare. The repertoire expanded to other plays beginning in 1965. To better capture that scope, the name was changed to Great Lakes Theater Festival (GLTF) in 1985.

In 1982, the GLTF moved from Lakewood to the Ohio Theater in Cleveland to become the first resident company in Playhouse Square, an historic district home to several 1920s venues. Since 2008 it has performed in the Hanna Theater in Playhouse Square. The Hanna seats 550. In addition to foundations and financial donations, Tom Hanks raised money for renovations through his performance of "Tom Hanks at the Hanna." The theater reached its goals for the renovation as well as securing an endowment that would support operations in years to come.

In 2005, the GLTF won the Northern Ohio Live Magazine Award for Excellence in Theater and in 2006 won The Free Times Readers Choice Award for Best Performing Arts Group. Further accolades include the prestige as one of two Cleveland theaters, alongside the Cleveland Play House, with membership in the League of Resident Theaters, a designation that makes Cleveland only one of 11 US cities with that acclaim.

"Festival" was eliminated from the title in 2011 to better reflect its September through May season and programming format. Having staged over 300 productions, the theater celebrated its 50th season in 2011-2012 and commemorated the milestone with a gala in April 2012.

In 2025, Great Lakes Theater announced a partnership with nearby Oberlin Conservatory to allow students in the latter's musical theater program to audition for and perform in GLT productions.

== Notable alumni ==
One of the most well-known alumni of the GLTF is Tom Hanks, who went on to become an Academy Award winning actor. Having worked with the theater in the summers of 1977–1979 as an intern and core company member, Hanks credits that time for teaching him to act. Other Academy Award-winning alumni include Olympia Dukakis, recognized for her performance in the film Moonstruck (1987), Ruby Dee who won for her performance in the film American Gangster (2007), and Cloris Leachman best known for her roles in The Facts of Life and the Mary Tyler Moore Show. The theater's reputation and strong artistic direction attracted talented actors across the years. In 1994, years after she played opposite Paul Newman in The Hustler (1961), Piper Laurie performed Lyuba Ranevsky in the GLTF production of The Cherry Orchard. Jean Stapleton, who played Edith Bunker in the comedy series All in the Family, performed on the GLTF stage in 1986 (Arsenic and Old Lace). Hal Holbrook collaborated with Gerald Freedman, artistic director, on King Lear (1990), Uncle Vanya (1991), and Death of a Salesman (1994). Holbrook is best known for his award-winning one man show Mark Twain Tonight. Additionally, the theater lists among its alumni actors who went on to play famously known television and film characters, such as Major Frank Burns of MASH performed by alum Larry Linville and Freddy Krueger played by former GLTF actor Robert Englund. Several actors returned to GLTC for performances even after achieving fame. For example, paying tribute to his father, Arthur Lithgow the first GLTC director, John Lithgow performed a tribute show titled Stories by Heart in 2010. Lithgow is known for his film appearances in World According to Garp and Terms of Endearment. Directors who gained experience at the theater include George Abbott.

== Artistic directors ==
Arthur Lithgow was the founding artistic director and worked as such until 1966. Alongside Dorothy Teare, Lithgow established educational programming for local schools delivered through student matinees as well as classroom partnerships, subsidized in part by the Cleveland Foundation.

Lawrence Carra, a drama professor at Carnegie Mellon University, was the artistic director between 1966 and 1975.

During Vincent Dowling's tenure from 1976 to 1985, the company moved from its Lakewood Civic Auditorium home to the Ohio Theatre of the Playhouse Square Center in 1982. Dowling had been a veteran actor of the Dublin Abbey Theater prior to taking on this post and was quoted as saying that his primary goal was to provide a drama diet for the Ohio community.

Gerald Freedman became the artistic director in 1985 and left in 1997 when the board required that the director be in residence year round. Increasing the theater's prestige, Freedman successfully attracted well-known actors and directors to the GLTF stage, including: George Abbott, Jean Stapleton, Hal Holbrook, and Ruby Dee. Under his direction, GLSF changed its name to the "Great Lakes Theater Festival.

Freedman was followed by James Bundy in 1998. James Bundy was the artistic director between 1998 and 2002 when he left to become the Dean of the Yale School of Drama and artistic director of Yale Repertory Theater. During Bundy's tenure the theater realized its most attended season to date in 2001, with 77,000 audience attendees.

Charles Fee has been the artistic director since 2002. Under Fee's direction, the theater began partnerships with the Idaho Shakespeare Festival, Lake Tahoe Shakespeare Festival, and the Playhouse Square Foundation. Fee inherited more than $1 million in debt.

== Educational outreach ==
The theater began as a citizen-led endeavor to support community cultural engagement and maintains educational outreach as central to its mission today. Approximately 50,000 students in Northeast Ohio experience the theater each year through various programs.
