= UEFA Champions League =

European association football tournament

- Organiser(s): UEFA
- Founded: 1955; 71 years ago (rebranded in 1992)
- Region: Europe
- Teams: 36 (league phase); 81 (total)
- Qualifier for: UEFA Super Cup; FIFA Intercontinental Cup; FIFA Club World Cup
- Related competitions: UEFA Europa League (2nd tier); UEFA Conference League (3rd tier) UEFA Youth League (youth competition)
- Current champions: (France) Paris Saint-Germain (2nd title)
- Most championships: (Spain) Real Madrid (15 titles)
- Broadcasters: List of broadcasters
- Website: www.uefa.com/uefachampionsleague
- 2026–27 UEFA Champions League

The UEFA Champions League (UCL), commonly known as the Champions League, is an annual club football competition organised by the Union of European Football Associations (UEFA) that is contested by top-division European clubs. The competition begins with a round robin league phase to qualify for the two-legged knockout rounds and the single-leg final. It is the most-watched club competition in the world and the third most-watched football competition overall, after the FIFA World Cup and the UEFA European Championship. It is one of the most prestigious football tournaments in the world and the most prestigious club competition in European football, played by the national league champions (and, for some nations, one or more runners-up) of their national associations.

Introduced in 1955 as the European Champion Clubs' Cup (Note: French: Coupe des Clubs Champions Européens) and commonly known as the European Cup, it was initially a straight knockout tournament open only to the champions of Europe's domestic leagues, with its winner considered to be the European club champion. The competition took on its current name in 1992, adding a round-robin group stage in 1991 and allowing multiple entrants from certain countries since the 1997–98 season. While only the winners of many of Europe's national leagues can enter the competition, the top 5 leagues by coefficient provide four teams each by default, with a possibility for additional spots based on performance during the previous season. Clubs that finish below the qualifying spots are eligible for the second-tier UEFA Europa League competition, and since 2021, for the third-tier UEFA Conference League.

In its present format, the Champions League begins in early July with three qualifying rounds and a play-off round, all played over two legs. The seven surviving teams enter the league phase, joining 29 teams qualified in advance. The 36 teams each play eight opponents, four home and four away. The 24 highest-ranked teams proceed to the knockout phase that culminates with the final match in late May or early June. The winner of the Champions League automatically qualifies for the following season's Champions League, the UEFA Super Cup, the FIFA Intercontinental Cup, and the quadrennial FIFA Club World Cup.

Spanish clubs have the most victories (20 wins), followed by England (15 wins), Italy (12 wins), Germany (8 wins), Netherlands (6 wins), Portugal (4 wins) and France (3 wins). England has the most winning teams, with six clubs having won the title. The competition has been won by 24 clubs and 13 of them have won it more than once. Since the tournament changed name and structure in 1992, only two top-tier football clubs outside the Big Five European nations (Spain, England, Italy, Germany and France) have also reached the final: Porto (2003–04) and Ajax (1994–95 and 1995–96).

Real Madrid is the most successful club in the tournament's history, having won it 15 times. They are also the only club to have won it five times in a row (the first five editions). Only one club has won all of their matches in a single tournament en route to their tournament victory, Bayern Munich in the 2019–20 season. Paris Saint-Germain are the current European champions, having beaten Arsenal on penalties in the 2026 final for their second consecutive title.

== History ==
Winners European Cup / UEFA Champions League
| Season | Winners |
European Cup
| 1955–56 | (Spain) Real Madrid |
| 1956–57 | (Spain) Real Madrid (2) |
| 1957–58 | (Spain) Real Madrid (3) |
| 1958–59 | (Spain) Real Madrid (4) |
| 1959–60 | (Spain) Real Madrid (5) |
| 1960–61 | (Portugal) Benfica |
| 1961–62 | (Portugal) Benfica (2) |
| 1962–63 | (Italy) Milan |
| 1963–64 | (Italy) Inter Milan |
| 1964–65 | (Italy) Inter Milan (2) |
| 1965–66 | (Spain) Real Madrid (6) |
| 1966–67 | (Scotland) Celtic |
| 1967–68 | (England) Manchester United |
| 1968–69 | (Italy) Milan (2) |
| 1969–70 | (Netherlands) Feyenoord |
| 1970–71 | (Netherlands) Ajax |
| 1971–72 | (Netherlands) Ajax (2) |
| 1972–73 | (Netherlands) Ajax (3) |
| 1973–74 | (West Germany) Bayern Munich |
| 1974–75 | (West Germany) Bayern Munich (2) |
| 1975–76 | (West Germany) Bayern Munich (3) |
| 1976–77 | (England) Liverpool |
| 1977–78 | (England) Liverpool (2) |
| 1978–79 | (England) Nottingham Forest |
| 1979–80 | (England) Nottingham Forest (2) |
| 1980–81 | (England) Liverpool (3) |
| 1981–82 | (England) Aston Villa |
| 1982–83 | (West Germany) Hamburger SV |
| 1983–84 | (England) Liverpool (4) |
| 1984–85 | (Italy) Juventus |
| 1985–86 | (Romania) Steaua București |
| 1986–87 | (Portugal) Porto |
| 1987–88 | (Netherlands) PSV Eindhoven |
| 1988–89 | (Italy) Milan (3) |
| 1989–90 | (Italy) Milan (4) |
| 1990–91 | (Socialist Federal Republic of Yugoslavia) Red Star Belgrade |
| 1991–92 | (Spain) Barcelona |
UEFA Champions League
| 1992–93 | (France) Marseille |
| 1993–94 | (Italy) Milan (5) |
| 1994–95 | (Netherlands) Ajax (4) |
| 1995–96 | (Italy) Juventus (2) |
| 1996–97 | (Germany) Borussia Dortmund |
| 1997–98 | (Spain) Real Madrid (7) |
| 1998–99 | (England) Manchester United (2) |
| 1999–2000 | (Spain) Real Madrid (8) |
| 2000–01 | (Germany) Bayern Munich (4) |
| 2001–02 | (Spain) Real Madrid (9) |
| 2002–03 | (Italy) Milan (6) |
| 2003–04 | (Portugal) Porto (2) |
| 2004–05 | (England) Liverpool (5) |
| 2005–06 | (Spain) Barcelona (2) |
| 2006–07 | (Italy) Milan (7) |
| 2007–08 | (England) Manchester United (3) |
| 2008–09 | (Spain) Barcelona (3) |
| 2009–10 | (Italy) Inter Milan (3) |
| 2010–11 | (Spain) Barcelona (4) |
| 2011–12 | (England) Chelsea |
| 2012–13 | (Germany) Bayern Munich (5) |
| 2013–14 | (Spain) Real Madrid (10) |
| 2014–15 | (Spain) Barcelona (5) |
| 2015–16 | (Spain) Real Madrid (11) |
| 2016–17 | (Spain) Real Madrid (12) |
| 2017–18 | (Spain) Real Madrid (13) |
| 2018–19 | (England) Liverpool (6) |
| 2019–20 | (Germany) Bayern Munich (6) |
| 2020–21 | (England) Chelsea (2) |
| 2021–22 | (Spain) Real Madrid (14) |
| 2022–23 | (England) Manchester City |
| 2023–24 | (Spain) Real Madrid (15) |
| 2024–25 | (France) Paris Saint-Germain |
| 2025–26 | (France) Paris Saint-Germain (2) |

The first time the champions of two European leagues met was in what was nicknamed the 1895 World Championship, when English champions Sunderland beat Scottish champions Heart of Midlothian 5–3. The first pan-European tournament was the Challenge Cup, a competition between clubs in the Austro-Hungarian Empire. Three years later, in 1900, the champions of Belgium, Netherlands and Switzerland, which were the only existing leagues in continental Europe at the time, participated in the Coupe Van der Straeten Ponthoz, thus being dubbed as the "club championship of the continent" by the local newspapers.

The Mitropa Cup, a competition modelled after the Challenge Cup, was created in 1927, an idea of Austrian Hugo Meisl, and played between Central European clubs. In 1930, the Coupe des Nations (lit. 'Nations Cup'), the first attempt to create a cup for national champion clubs of Europe, was played and organised by Swiss club Servette. Held in Geneva, it brought together ten champions from across the continent. The tournament was won by Újpest of Hungary. Latin European nations came together to form the Latin Cup in 1949.

After receiving reports from his journalists over the highly successful South American Championship of Champions of 1948, Gabriel Hanot, editor of L'Équipe, began proposing the creation of a continent-wide tournament. In interviews, Jacques Ferran (one of the founders of the European Champions Cup, together with Gabriel Hanot), said that the South American Championship of Champions was the inspiration for the European Champions Cup. After Stan Cullis declared Wolverhampton Wanderers "Champions of the World" following a successful run of friendlies in the 1950s, in particular a 3–2 friendly victory against Budapest Honvéd, Hanot finally managed to convince UEFA to put into practice such a tournament. It was conceived in Paris in 1955 as the European Champion Clubs' Cup.

=== 1955–1967: Beginnings ===
The first European Cup took place during the 1955–56 season. Sixteen teams participated (some by invitation): Milan (Italy), AGF Aarhus (Denmark), Anderlecht (Belgium), Djurgården (Sweden), Gwardia Warszawa (Poland), Hibernian (Scotland), Partizan (Yugoslavia), PSV Eindhoven (Netherlands), Rapid Wien (Austria), Real Madrid (Spain), Rot-Weiss Essen (West Germany), Saarbrücken (Saar), Servette (Switzerland), Sporting CP (Portugal), Reims (France) and Vörös Lobogó (Hungary).

The first European Cup match took place on 4 September 1955, and ended in a 3–3 draw between Sporting CP and Partizan. The first goal in European Cup history was scored by João Baptista Martins of Sporting CP. The inaugural final took place at the Parc des Princes between Stade de Reims and Real Madrid on 13 June 1956. The Spanish squad came back from behind to win 4–3 thanks to goals from Alfredo Di Stéfano and Marquitos, as well as two goals from Héctor Rial. Real Madrid successfully defended the trophy next season in their home stadium, the Santiago Bernabéu, against Fiorentina. After a scoreless first half, Real Madrid scored twice in six minutes to defeat the Italians. In 1958, Milan failed to capitalise after going ahead on the scoreline twice, only for Real Madrid to equalise. The final, held in Heysel Stadium, went to extra time where Francisco Gento scored the game-winning goal to allow Real Madrid to retain the title for the third consecutive season.

In a rematch of the first final, Real Madrid faced Stade Reims at the Neckarstadion for the 1959 final, and won 2–0. West German side Eintracht Frankfurt became the first team not to compete in the Latin cup to reach the European Cup final. The 1960 final holds the record for the most goals scored, with Real Madrid beating Eintracht Frankfurt 7–3 at Hampden Park, courtesy of four goals by Ferenc Puskás and a hat-trick by Alfredo Di Stéfano. This was Real Madrid's fifth consecutive title, a record that still stands today.

Real Madrid's reign ended in the 1960–61 season when bitter rivals Barcelona dethroned them in the first round. Barcelona were defeated in the final by Portuguese side Benfica 3–2 at the Wankdorf Stadium. Reinforced by Eusébio, Benfica defeated Real Madrid 5–3 at the Olympic Stadium in Amsterdam and kept the title for a second consecutive season. Benfica wanted to repeat Real Madrid's successful run of the 1950s after reaching the showpiece event of the 1962–63 European Cup, but a brace from Brazilian-Italian José Altafini at Wembley gave the spoils to Milan, making the trophy leave the Iberian Peninsula for the first time ever.

Inter Milan beat an ageing Real Madrid 3–1 at the Ernst-Happel-Stadion to win the 1963–64 season and replicate their local-rival's success. The title stayed in Milan for the third year in a row after Inter beat Benfica 1–0 at their home ground, the San Siro. Under the leadership of Jock Stein, Scottish club Celtic beat Inter Milan 2–1 in the 1967 final to become the first British club to win the European Cup. The Celtic players that day, all of whom were born within 30 miles (48 km) of Glasgow, subsequently became known as the "Lisbon Lions".

=== 1968–1976 ===
The 1967–68 season saw Manchester United become the first English team to win the European Cup, beating two-times winners Benfica 4–1 in the final. In the 1968–69 season, Ajax became the first Dutch team to reach the European Cup final, but they were beaten 4–1 by Milan, who claimed their second European Cup, with Pierino Prati scoring a hat-trick.

The 1969–70 season saw the first Dutch winners of the competition. Feyenoord knocked out the defending champions, Milan in the second round, before beating Celtic in the final. In the 1970–71 season, Ajax won the title, beating Greek side Panathinaikos in the final. The season saw a number of changes, with penalty shoot-outs being introduced, and the away goals rule being changed so that it would be used in all rounds except the final. It was also the first time a Greek team reached the final, as well as the first season that Real Madrid failed to qualify, having finished sixth in La Liga the previous season. Ajax went on to win the competition three years in a row (1971 to 1973), which Bayern Munich emulated from 1974 to 1976.

The era was characterized by the dominance of football clubs from the Netherlands and West Germany, who together won 7 back-to-back European Cups between 1970 and 1976.

=== 1977–1997: Heysel Disaster and rebrand into Champions League ===
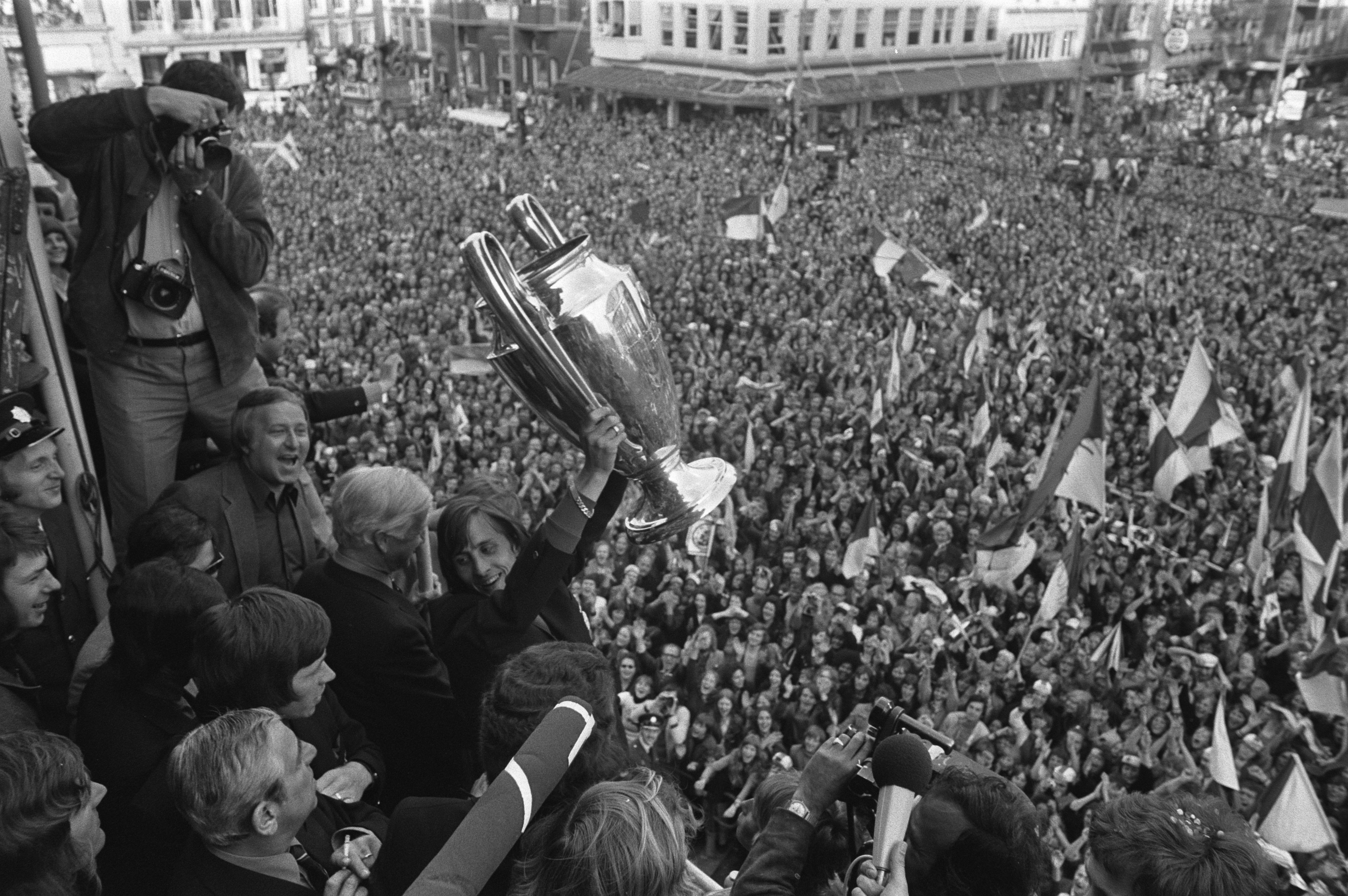
Johan Cruyff (pictured in 1972) won the European Cup three times in a row with Ajax.

Liverpool won their first two titles in 1977 and 1978. The following seasons saw victories in 1978–79 and 1979–80 for Brian Clough's Nottingham Forest. The following year Liverpool won their third title before Aston Villa continued the sense of English dominance in 1982. In 1982–83, Hamburger SV broke the English dominance. Liverpool regained it in 1983–84 before losing to Juventus (1984–85). All English clubs were banned for five years (Liverpool for six years) following the 1985 European Cup final due to the Heysel Stadium disaster.

Following the five-year ban on English teams, Steaua București won the European Cup in 1985–86, followed by Porto in 1986–87, PSV Eindhoven in 1987–88; Milan (2), Red Star Belgrade and Barcelona became champions before the competition was re-formulated as the UEFA Champions League. The 1996-97 season was the final Champions League tournament in which only European league champions were allowed to compete; the tournament was won by Borussia Dortmund.

The era was characterized by the dominance of football clubs from England between 1977 and 1984, winning seven European Cup finals, and later the dominance of Italian football clubs in the 1990s; in a nine-year period from 1989 to 1998, Italian clubs reached nine Champions League finals.

=== 1998–present: League expansion ===
The era was characterized by the dominance of football clubs from Spain, who won 3 out of 5 finals from 1998–2002 and dominated the competition from 2014–18, with Real Madrid winning three back-to-back Champions League titles in 2016, 2017, and 2018, and England, who won 3 times between 2005–12 (as did Barcelona) and had 3 wins from 2018–23. From the expansion of the Champions League in 1997–98 to the 2023-24 final, Spanish clubs reached 17 finals and English clubs reached 16 finals.

During the 2020 COVID-19 pandemic, the tournament was suspended in mid-March 2020 and resumed in August 2020. Games were played at neutral venues and without spectators.

== Anthem ==
"Magic...it's magic above all else. When you hear the anthem it captivates you straight away."

— Zinedine Zidane

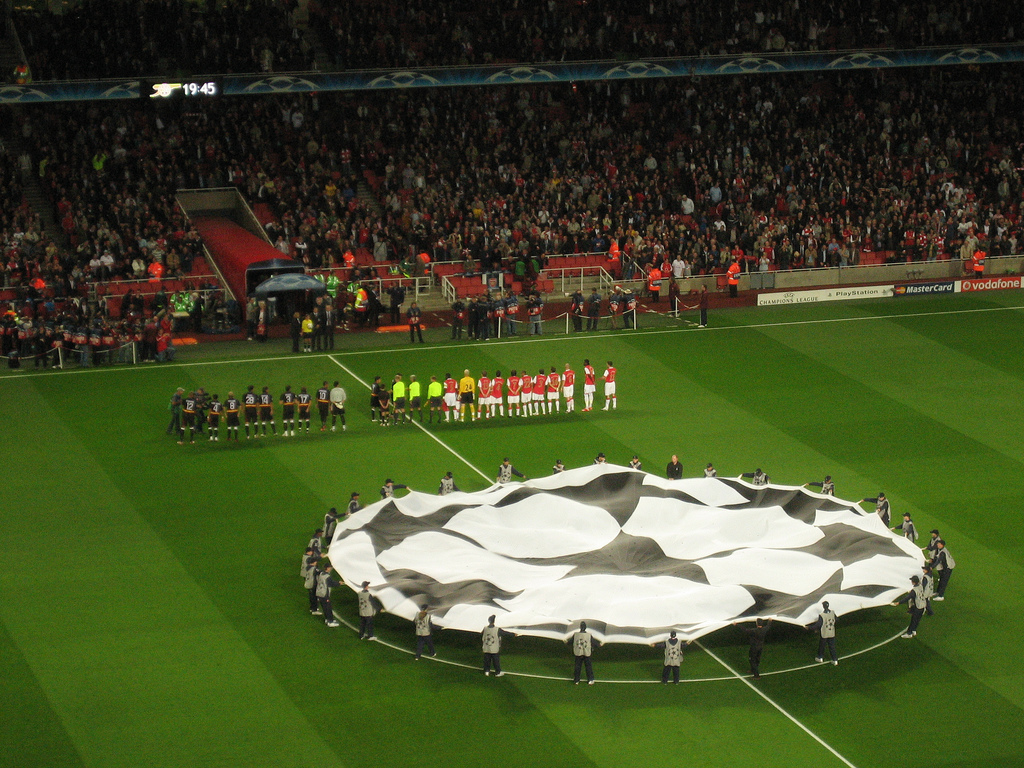
The two teams line up for the UEFA Champions League Anthem before each match and a flag of the Champions League "starball" logo is waved in the centre circle.

The UEFA Champions League anthem, officially titled simply as "Champions League", was written by Tony Britten, and is an adaptation of George Frideric Handel's 1727 anthem Zadok the Priest (one of his Coronation Anthems). UEFA commissioned Britten in 1992 to arrange an anthem, and the piece was performed by London's Royal Philharmonic Orchestra and sung by the Academy of St. Martin in the Fields. Stating that "the anthem is now almost as iconic as the trophy", UEFA's official website adds it is "known to set the hearts of many of the world's top footballers aflutter". It was first played during the 1992–93 season.

The chorus contains the three official languages used by UEFA: English, German, and French. The climactic moment is set to the exclamations 'Die Meister! Die Besten! Les Grandes Équipes! The Champions!'. The anthem's chorus is played before each UEFA Champions League game as the two teams are lined up, as well as at the beginning and end of television broadcasts of the matches. In addition to the anthem, there is also entrance music, which contains parts of the anthem itself, which is played as teams enter the field. The complete anthem is about three minutes long, and has two short verses and the chorus.

Special vocal versions have been performed live at the Champions League final with lyrics in other languages, changing over to the host nation's language for the chorus. These versions were performed by Andrea Bocelli (Italian; Rome 2009, Milan 2016 and Cardiff 2017), Juan Diego Flores (Spanish; Madrid 2010), All Angels (Wembley 2011), Jonas Kaufmann and David Garrett (Munich 2012) and Mariza (Lisbon 2014). In the 2013 final at Wembley, the chorus was played twice. In the 2018 and 2019 finals, held in Kyiv and Madrid respectively, the instrumental version of the chorus was played, by 2Cellos (2018) and Asturia Girls (2019). In the 2023 final, held in Istanbul, Hungarian pianist Ádám György performed the piano version of the anthem. The anthem has been released commercially in its original version on iTunes and Spotify with the title of Champions League Theme. In 2018, composer Hans Zimmer remixed the anthem with rapper Vince Staples for EA Sports' video game FIFA 19, with it also featuring in the game's reveal trailer.

== Branding ==
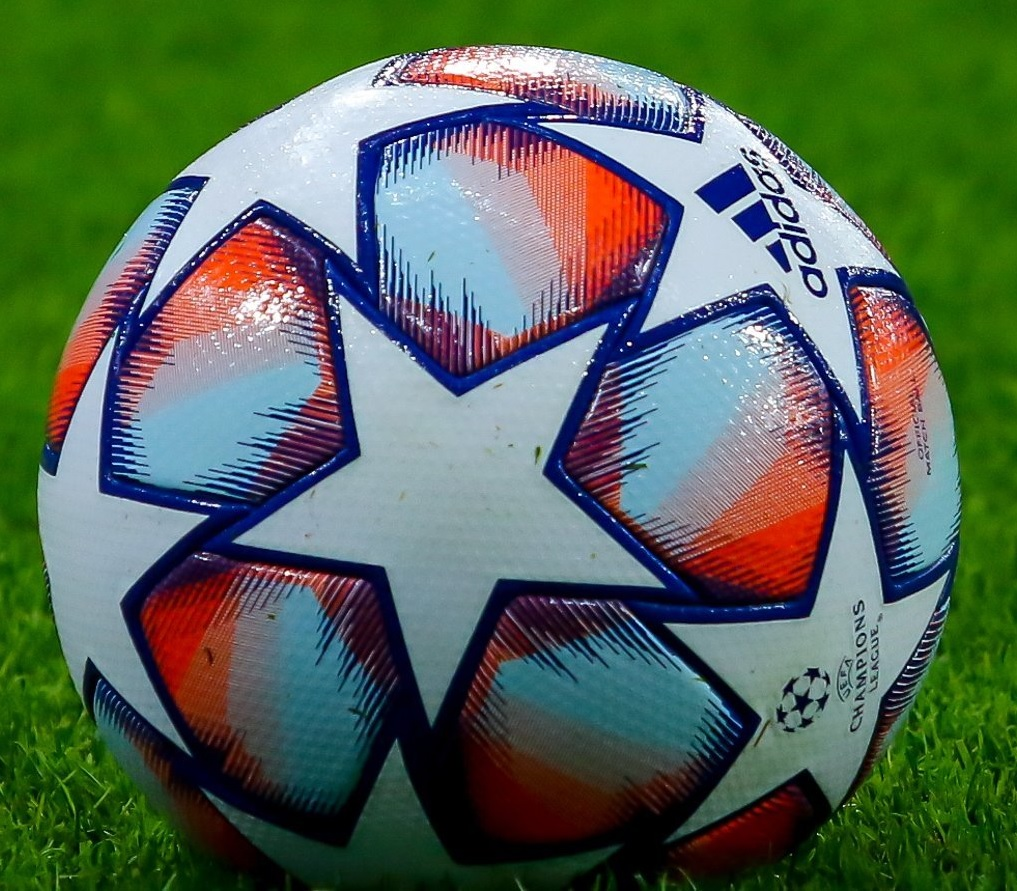
The "starball" logo is incorporated into the design of the competition's official match ball, the Adidas Finale.

In 1991, UEFA asked its commercial partner, Television Event and Media Marketing (TEAM), to help brand the Champions League. This resulted in the anthem, "house colours" of black and white or silver and a logo, and the "starball". The starball was created by Design Bridge, a London-based firm selected by TEAM after a competition. TEAM gives particular attention to detail in how the colours and starball are depicted at matches. According to TEAM, "Irrespective of whether you are a spectator in Moscow or Milan, you will always see the same stadium dressing materials, the same opening ceremony featuring the 'starball' centre circle ceremony, and hear the same UEFA Champions League Anthem". Based on research it conducted, TEAM concluded that by 1999, "the starball logo had achieved a recognition rate of 94 percent among fans". The 2001 UEFA Champions League final marked the first time a bespoke official match ball was used in the competition, introducing the Adidas Finale featuring the tournament's iconic starball design.

== Format ==
A map of UEFA countries whose teams have reached the league phase or group stage of the UEFA Champions League UEFA member state that has been represented in the league phase or group stage UEFA member state that has not been represented in the league phase or group stage

=== Qualification ===
The UEFA Champions League used to begin with a double round-robin group stage of 32 teams until it evolved into a league phase of 36 teams, which is preceded by two qualification 'streams' for teams that do not receive direct entry to the tournament proper. The two streams are divided between teams qualified by virtue of being league champions, and those qualified by virtue of finishing second, third or fourth in their national championship.

The number of teams that each association enters into the UEFA Champions League is based upon the UEFA coefficients of the member associations. These coefficients are generated by the results of clubs representing each association during the previous five Champions League, Europa League and Conference League seasons. The higher an association's coefficient, the more teams represent the association in the Champions League, and the fewer qualification rounds the association's teams must compete in.

Five of the remaining seven qualifying places are granted to the winners of a four-round qualifying tournament between the remaining 43 or 44 national champions, within which those champions from associations with higher coefficients receive byes to later rounds. The other two are granted to the winners of a three-round qualifying tournament between ten and eleven clubs from the associations ranked 5–6 through 15, which have qualified based upon finishing second, third or fourth in their respective national league.

In addition to sporting criteria, any club must be licensed by its national association to participate in the Champions League. To obtain a licence, the club must meet certain stadium, infrastructure and finance requirements.

In 2005–06, Liverpool and Artmedia Bratislava became the first teams to reach the Champions League group stage after playing in all three qualifying rounds. Real Madrid and Barcelona hold the record for the most appearances in the group stage, having qualified 29 times, followed by Bayern Munich on 28.

Between 1999 and 2008, no differentiation was made between champions and non-champions in qualification. The 16 top-ranked teams spread across the biggest domestic leagues qualified directly for the tournament group stage. Prior to this, three preliminary knockout qualifying rounds whittled down the remaining teams, with teams starting in different rounds.

An exception to the usual European qualification system happened in 2005, after Liverpool won the Champions League the year before, but did not finish in a Champions League qualification place in the Premier League that season. UEFA gave special dispensation for Liverpool to enter the Champions League, giving England five qualifiers. UEFA subsequently ruled that the defending champions qualify for the competition the following year regardless of their domestic league placing. However, for those leagues with four entrants in the Champions League, this meant that, if the Champions League winner fell outside of its domestic league's top four, it would qualify at the expense of the fourth-placed team in the league. Until 2015–16, no association could have more than four entrants in the Champions League. In May 2012, Tottenham Hotspur finished fourth in the 2011–12 Premier League, two places ahead of Chelsea, but failed to qualify for the 2012–13 Champions League, after Chelsea won the 2012 final. Tottenham were demoted to the 2012–13 UEFA Europa League.

In May 2013, it was decided that, starting from the 2015–16 season (and continuing at least for the three-year cycle until the 2017–18 season), the winners of the previous season's UEFA Europa League would qualify for the UEFA Champions League, entering at least the play-off round, and entering the group stage if the berth reserved for the Champions League title holders was not used. The previous limit of a maximum of four teams per association was increased to five, meaning that a fourth-placed team from one of the top three ranked associations would only have to be moved to the Europa League if both the Champions League and Europa League winners came from that association and both finished outside the top four of their domestic league. Starting from the 2018–19 season, the Europa League winner would receive automatic qualification for the Champions League group stage, with no additional entries required. Starting from the 2024–25 season, the two associations with the highest coefficients from the previous season would receive an extra Champions League spot (known as European Performance Spot) into the league phase. The Champions League and Europa League winners would not be able to fill the European Performance Spots, and they would still receive an additional spot if one or both came from the same top-five association and finished outside of the top four of their domestic league, though the fourth-placed team of the league would no longer go to the Europa League, thus increasing the maximum number of teams per association from five to seven.

In 2007, Michel Platini, the UEFA president, had proposed taking one place from the three leagues with four entrants and allocating it to that nation's cup winners. This proposal was rejected in a vote at a UEFA Strategy Council meeting. In the same meeting, however, it was agreed that the third-placed team in the top three leagues would receive automatic qualification for the group stage, rather than entry into the third qualifying round, while the fourth-placed team would enter the play-off round for non-champions, guaranteeing an opponent from one of the top 15 leagues in Europe. This was part of Platini's plan to increase the number of teams qualifying directly into the group stage, while simultaneously increasing the number of teams from lower-ranked nations in the group stage. In the reforming plan for the 2018–21 cycle, which was announced in August 2016 and confirmed in December, the top four teams in the top four leagues would receive automatic qualification for the group stage.

In 2012, Arsène Wenger referred to qualifying for the Champions League by finishing in the top four places in the Premier League as the "4th Place Trophy". The phrase was coined after a pre-match conference when he was questioned about Arsenal's lack of a trophy after exiting the FA Cup. He said "The first trophy is to finish in the top four". At Arsenal's 2012 AGM, Wenger was also quoted as saying: "For me there are five trophies every season: Premier League, Champions League, the third is to qualify for the Champions League..."

=== League phase and knockout phase ===
Beginning with the 2024–25 season, UEFA changed the format of their three club competitions, abandoning the group stage in favour of an expanded league phase. The number of participating teams was increased from 32 to 36 teams. Teams are no longer divided into groups of four teams each but are ranked in a single table resembling the Swiss-system tournament format. Each team plays eight matches against eight different opponents. For the draw of the league phase, teams are divided into four seeding pots according to their UEFA coefficient. Each team will play against two teams from each pot, one home and one away. The league phase is played from September to January, while the knockout phase begins in February, with matches predominantly played on Tuesday and Wednesday nights.

After the league phase, a two-legged knockout play-off round is played between teams finishing 9–16 (seeded) and 17–24 (unseeded) in the league phase. Teams finishing in the top eight of the league phase receive a bye to the round of 16 as seeded teams, while the eight winning teams from the knockout play-off round will enter the round of 16 draw as unseeded teams. Teams finishing 25th–36th place in the league phase and the eight losers of the knockout play-offs are eliminated from the competition and from European football since it is no longer possible to enter the Europa League from the league phase onwards.

After the round of 16 the competition follows the traditional knockout format with quarter-finals, semi-finals (both two legged and without association draw protection) and then the final at a venue chosen prior to the season. The final is typically held in late May or early June.

Prior to the 2024–25 season, there was a group stage of 32 teams, divided into eight groups of four. The draw to determine which teams entered each group was seeded based on each team's UEFA coefficient, and no group could contain more than one club from each association. Each team played six group stage games, meeting the other three teams in its group home and away in a round-robin format. The first place team and the runners-up from each group then progressed to the next round. The third-placed teams entered the Europa League's knockout round and the fourth-placed teams were eliminated from the competition.

For the next stage—the last 16—the winning team from one group played against the runners-up from another group, but teams from the same association could not be drawn against each other (see random two-sided matching). From the quarter-finals onwards, the draw was entirely random, without association protection.

The group stage was played from September to December, whilst the knockout stage began in February, with matches usually played on Tuesday and Wednesday nights. The knockout ties were played in a two-legged format, with the exception of the final. In the 2019–20 season, due to the COVID-19 pandemic the tournament was suspended for five months. The format of the remainder of the tournament was temporarily amended as a result, with the quarter-finals and semi-finals being played as single match knockout ties at neutral venues in Lisbon, Portugal in the summer with the final taking place on 23 August 2020.

=== Distribution ===
The following is the default access list.

Access list for UEFA Champions League from 2024−25 season
| | | Teams entering in this round | Teams advancing from the previous round |
|---|---|---|---|
| First qualifying round (32 teams) | | 32 champions from associations 23–55 (except Liechtenstein) | |
| Second qualifying round | Champions Path (24 teams) | 8 champions from associations 15–22 | 16 winners from the first qualifying round |
| Second qualifying round | League Path (6 teams) | 6 runners-up from associations 10–15 | |
| Third qualifying round | Champions Path (12 teams) | | 12 winners from the second qualifying round (Champions Path) |
| Third qualifying round | League Path (8 teams) | 3 runners-up from associations 7–9; 1 third-placed team from association 6; 1 fourth-placed team from association 5 | 3 winners from the second qualifying round (League Path) |
| Play-off round | Champions Path (10 teams) | 4 champions from associations 11–14 | 6 winners from the third qualifying round (Champions Path) |
| Play-off round | League Path (4 teams) | | 4 winners from the third qualifying round (League Path) |
| League phase (36 teams) | | UEFA Champions League title holders; UEFA Europa League title holders; 10 champions from associations 1–10; 6 runners-up from associations 1–6; 5 third-placed teams from associations 1–5; 4 fourth-placed teams from associations 1–4; 2 teams from associations with the highest 1-year association coefficient | 5 winners from the play-off round (Champions Path); 2 winners from the play-off round (League Path) |
| Preliminary knockout round (16 teams) | | | 16 teams ranked from 9−24 in league phase |
| Knockout phase (16 teams) | | | 8 Winners from previous play-off; 8 Teams ranked from 1−8 in league phase |

Changes will be made to the access list above if the Champions League or Europa League title holders qualify for the tournament via their domestic leagues.

- If the Champions League title holders qualify for the league phase via their domestic league's standard berth allocation, the best champions in qualifying rounds enter the league phase, and champions of the highest-ranked associations in earlier rounds are also promoted accordingly.
- If the Europa League title holders qualify for the league phase via their domestic league's standard berth allocation, the best club in qualifying rounds enters the league phase, except for the runners-up of associations 11–15, as they have a higher-ranked domestic team in the qualifiers, and teams of the highest-ranked associations in earlier rounds are also promoted accordingly.
- If the Champions League or Europa League title holders qualify for the qualifying rounds via their domestic league, their spot in the qualifying rounds is vacated, and teams of the highest-ranked associations in earlier rounds are promoted accordingly.

== Prizes ==
=== Trophy and medals ===
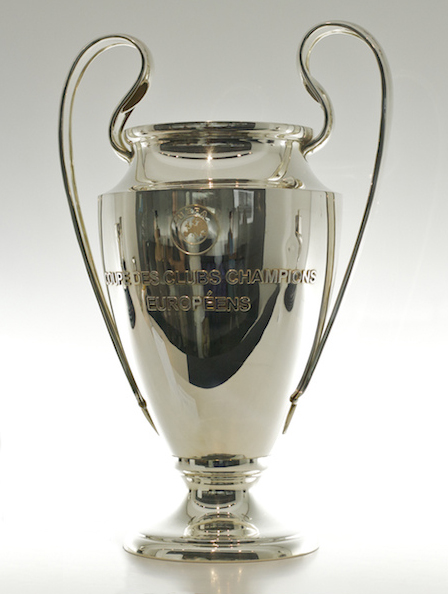
The trophy

Each year, the winning team is presented with the European Champion Clubs' Cup, the current version of which has been awarded since 1967. From the 1968–69 season and prior to the 2008–09 season any team that won the Champions League three years in a row or five times overall was awarded the official trophy permanently. Each time a club achieved this, a new official trophy had to be forged for the following season. Five clubs own a version of the official trophy: Real Madrid, Ajax, Bayern Munich, Milan and Liverpool. Since 2008, the official trophy has remained with UEFA and the clubs are awarded a replica.

The current trophy is 74 cm (29 in) tall and made of silver, weighing 11 kg (24 lb). It was designed by Jürg Stadelmann, a jeweller from Bern, Switzerland, after the original was given to Real Madrid in 1966 in recognition of their six titles to date, and cost 10,000 Swiss francs.

50 gold medals are presented to the Champions League winners, and 50 silver medals to the runners-up.

=== Prize money ===
Starting with the 2024–25 season, the distribution of the prize money is as follows.

- Play-off round: €4,290,000
- Base fee for league phase: €18,620,000
- League phase victory: €2,100,000
- League phase draw: €700,000
- Bonus based on league phase ranking: €275,000 - €9,900,000
- League phase top 8: €2,000,000
- League phase ranked 9 through 16: €1,000,000
- Knockout round play-offs: €1,000,000
- Round of 16: €11,000,000
- Quarter-finals: €12,500,000
- Semi-finals: €15,000,000
- Runners-up: €18,500,000
- Champions: €25,000,000

A large part of the distributed revenue from the UEFA Champions League is linked to the "market pool", the distribution of which is determined by the value of the television market in each nation. For the 2019–20 season, Paris Saint-Germain, who were the runners-up, earned nearly €126.8 million in total, of which €101.3 million was prize money, compared with the €125.46 million earned by Bayern Munich, who won the tournament and were awarded €112.96 million in prize money.

== Sponsorship ==
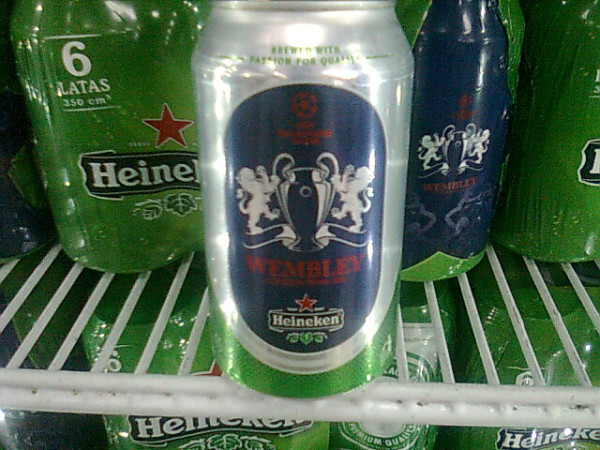
A can of Heineken with the branding of the 2011 UEFA Champions League final

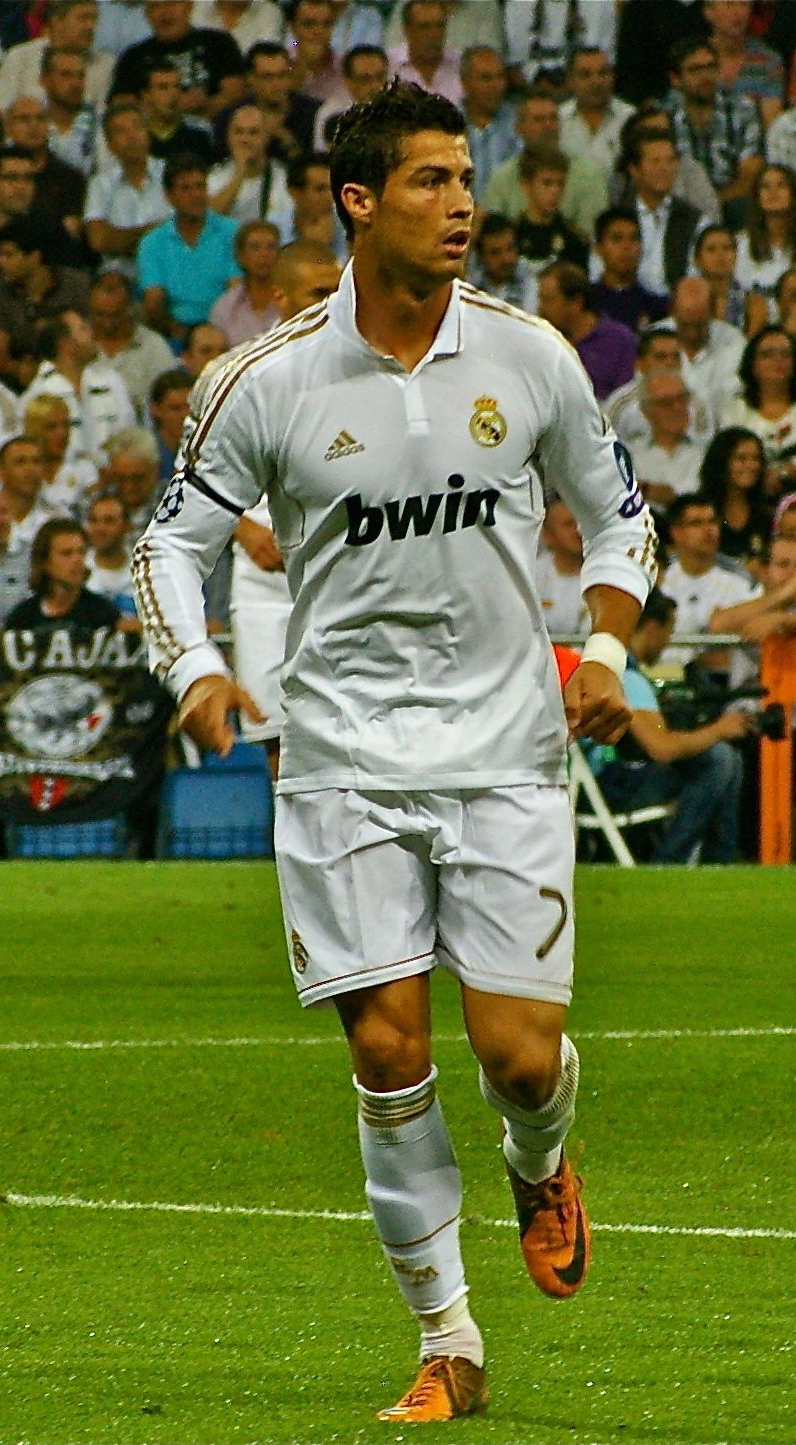
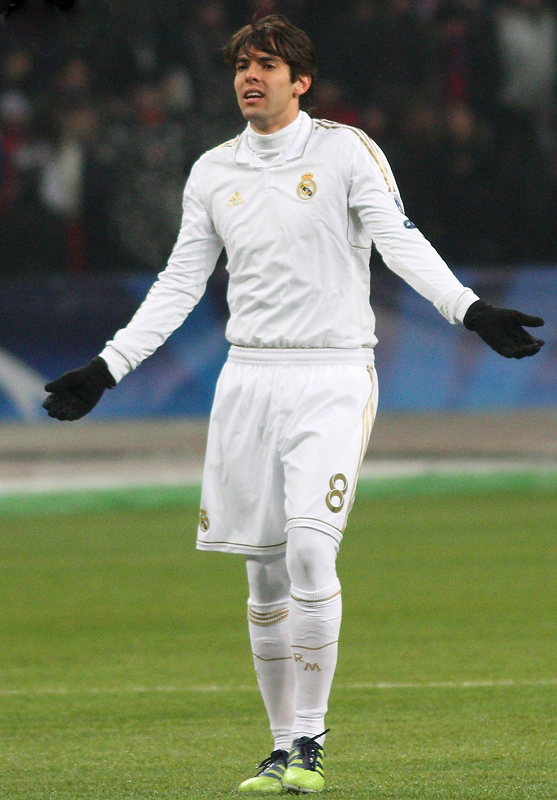
During the 2011–12 UEFA Champions League, bwin were the shirt sponsors for Real Madrid (left), however, the club were barred from wearing their bwin-sponsored jerseys when they played against CSKA Moscow in Russia in February 2012, where gambling advertisements were banned (right).

Like the FIFA World Cup, the UEFA Champions League is sponsored by a group of multinational corporations, in contrast to the single main sponsor typically found in national top-flight leagues. When the Champions League was created in 1992, it was decided that a maximum of eight companies should be allowed to sponsor the event, with each corporation being allocated four advertising boards around the perimeter of the pitch, as well as logo placement at pre- and post-match interviews and a certain number of tickets to each match. This, combined with a deal to ensure tournament sponsors were given priority on television advertisements during matches, ensured that each of the tournament's main sponsors was given maximum exposure.

From the 2012–13 knockout phase, UEFA used LED advertising hoardings installed in knockout participant stadiums, including the final. From the 2015–16 season onwards, UEFA has used such hoardings from the play-off round until the final. Since 2021, the UEFA also used Virtual Board Replacement (VBR) technology to offer region-based advertising; regional sponsors are inserted into the hoardings as shown on the broadcast feed in specific regions along with the global sponsors.

Individual clubs may wear jerseys with advertising. However, only two sponsorships are permitted per jersey in addition to that of the kit manufacturer, at the chest and the left sleeve. Exceptions are made for non-profit organisations, which can feature on the front of the shirt, incorporated with the main sponsor or in place of it; or on the back, either below the squad number or on the collar area.

If a club plays a match in a nation where the relevant sponsorship category is restricted (such as France's alcohol advertising restriction), then they must remove that logo from their jerseys. For example, when Rangers played French side Auxerre in the 1996–97 Champions League, they wore the logo of the holiday chain Center Parcs instead of their primary sponsor, McEwan's Lager (both companies at the time were subsidiaries of Scottish & Newcastle).

== Media coverage ==
The competition attracts an extensive television audience, not just in Europe, but throughout the world. The final of the tournament has been, in recent years, the most-watched annual sporting event in the world. The final of the 2012–13 tournament had the competition's highest TV ratings to date, drawing approximately 360 million television viewers.

== Team records and statistics ==
=== Performances by club ===
Performances in the European Cup and UEFA Champions League by club
| Club | Title(s) | Runners-up | Seasons won | Seasons runner-up |
|---|---|---|---|---|
| (Spain) Real Madrid | 15 | 3 | 1956, 1957, 1958, 1959, 1960, 1966, 1998, 2000, 2002, 2014, 2016, 2017, 2018, 2022, 2024 | 1962, 1964, 1981 |
| (Italy) Milan | 7 | 4 | 1963, 1969, 1989, 1990, 1994, 2003, 2007 | 1958, 1993, 1995, 2005 |
| (Germany) Bayern Munich | 6 | 5 | 1974, 1975, 1976, 2001, 2013, 2020 | 1982, 1987, 1999, 2010, 2012 |
| (England) Liverpool | 6 | 4 | 1977, 1978, 1981, 1984, 2005, 2019 | 1985, 2007, 2018, 2022 |
| (Spain) Barcelona | 5 | 3 | 1992, 2006, 2009, 2011, 2015 | 1961, 1986, 1994 |
| (Netherlands) Ajax | 4 | 2 | 1971, 1972, 1973, 1995 | 1969, 1996 |
| (Italy) Inter Milan | 3 | 4 | 1964, 1965, 2010 | 1967, 1972, 2023, 2025 |
| (England) Manchester United | 3 | 2 | 1968, 1999, 2008 | 2009, 2011 |
| (Italy) Juventus | 2 | 7 | 1985, 1996 | 1973, 1983, 1997, 1998, 2003, 2015, 2017 |
| (Portugal) Benfica | 2 | 5 | 1961, 1962 | 1963, 1965, 1968, 1988, 1990 |
| (England) Chelsea | 2 | 1 | 2012, 2021 | 2008 |
| (France) Paris Saint-Germain | 2 | 1 | 2025, 2026 | 2020 |
| (England) Nottingham Forest | 2 | 0 | 1979, 1980 | — |
| (Portugal) Porto | 2 | 0 | 1987, 2004 | — |
| (Germany) Borussia Dortmund | 1 | 2 | 1997 | 2013, 2024 |
| (Scotland) Celtic | 1 | 1 | 1967 | 1970 |
| (Germany) Hamburger SV | 1 | 1 | 1983 | 1980 |
| (Romania) Steaua București | 1 | 1 | 1986 | 1989 |
| (France) Marseille | 1 | 1 | 1993 | 1991 |
| (England) Manchester City | 1 | 1 | 2023 | 2021 |
| (Netherlands) Feyenoord | 1 | 0 | 1970 | — |
| (England) Aston Villa | 1 | 0 | 1982 | — |
| (Netherlands) PSV Eindhoven | 1 | 0 | 1988 | — |
| (Socialist Federal Republic of Yugoslavia) Red Star Belgrade | 1 | 0 | 1991 | — |
| (Spain) Atlético Madrid | 0 | 3 | — | 1974, 2014, 2016 |
| (France) Reims | 0 | 2 | — | 1956, 1959 |
| (Spain) Valencia | 0 | 2 | — | 2000, 2001 |
| (England) Arsenal | 0 | 2 | — | 2006, 2026 |
| (Italy) Fiorentina | 0 | 1 | — | 1957 |
| (Germany) Eintracht Frankfurt | 0 | 1 | — | 1960 |
| (Socialist Federal Republic of Yugoslavia) Partizan | 0 | 1 | — | 1966 |
| (Greece) Panathinaikos | 0 | 1 | — | 1971 |
| (England) Leeds United | 0 | 1 | — | 1975 |
| (France) Saint-Étienne | 0 | 1 | — | 1976 |
| (Germany) Borussia Mönchengladbach | 0 | 1 | — | 1977 |
| (Belgium) Club Brugge | 0 | 1 | — | 1978 |
| (Sweden) Malmö FF | 0 | 1 | — | 1979 |
| (Italy) Roma | 0 | 1 | — | 1984 |
| (Italy) Sampdoria | 0 | 1 | — | 1992 |
| (Germany) Bayer Leverkusen | 0 | 1 | — | 2002 |
| (France) Monaco | 0 | 1 | — | 2004 |
| (England) Tottenham Hotspur | 0 | 1 | — | 2019 |

=== Performances by nation ===
Performances in finals by nation
| Nation | Title(s) | Runners-up | Total |
|---|---|---|---|
| Spain | 20 | 11 | 31 |
| England | 15 | 12 | 27 |
| Italy | 12 | 18 | 30 |
| Germany (Note: Includes clubs representing West Germany. No clubs representing East Germany appeared in a final.) | 8 | 11 | 19 |
| Netherlands | 6 | 2 | 8 |
| Portugal | 4 | 5 | 9 |
| France | 3 | 6 | 9 |
| Romania | 1 | 1 | 2 |
| Scotland | 1 | 1 | 2 |
| Yugoslavia (Note: Both Yugoslav final appearances were by clubs from SR Serbia.) | 1 | 1 | 2 |
| Belgium | 0 | 1 | 1 |
| Greece | 0 | 1 | 1 |
| Sweden | 0 | 1 | 1 |

== Player records ==
=== Most wins ===
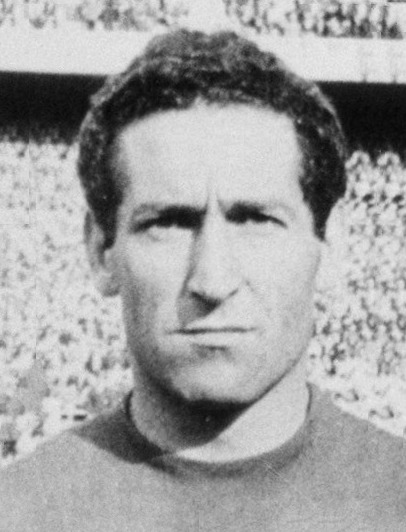
Paco Gento, first of the five players to have won the tournament on six occasions, appeared in eight finals.

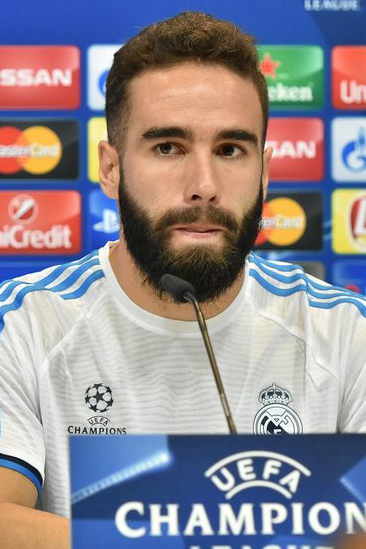
Dani Carvajal, the only player with six titles who started in all the finals he won, alongside Paco Gento

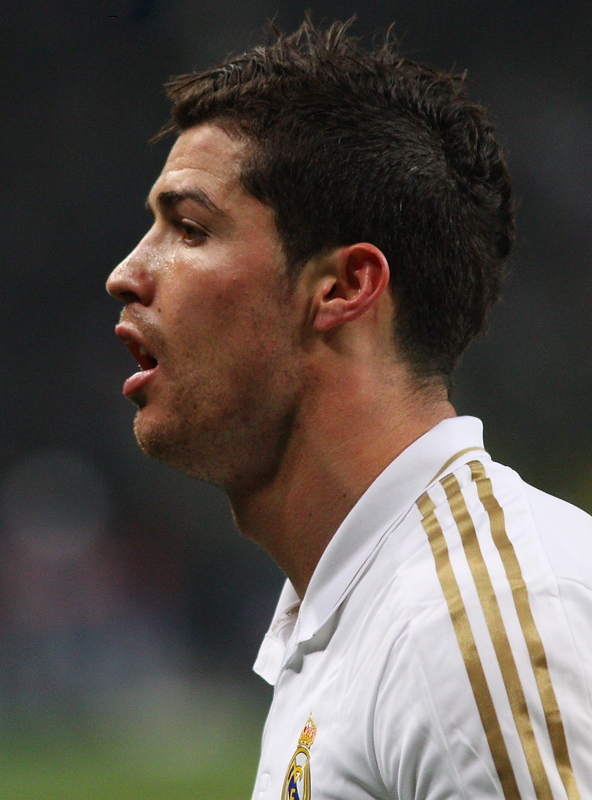
Cristiano Ronaldo holds the record for the most match wins in the tournament.

| No. of wins | Player | Club(s) |
|---|---|---|
| 6 | (Spain) Paco Gento | Real Madrid (1956, 1957, 1958, 1959, 1960, 1966) |
| 6 | (Germany) Toni Kroos | Bayern Munich (2013); Real Madrid (2016, 2017, 2018, 2022, 2024) |
| 6 | (Spain) Dani Carvajal | Real Madrid (2014, 2016, 2017, 2018, 2022, 2024) |
| 6 | (Croatia) Luka Modrić | Real Madrid (2014, 2016, 2017, 2018, 2022, 2024) |
| 6 | (Spain) Nacho | Real Madrid (2014, 2016, 2017, 2018, 2022, 2024) |
| 5 | (Spain) Juan Alonso | Real Madrid (1956, 1957, 1958, 1959, 1960) |
| 5 | (Spain) Rafael Lesmes | Real Madrid (1956, 1957, 1958, 1959, 1960) |
| 5 | (Spain) Marquitos | Real Madrid (1956, 1957, 1958, 1959, 1960) |
| 5 | (Spain) Héctor Rial | Real Madrid (1956, 1957, 1958, 1959, 1960) |
| 5 | (Argentina) (Spain) Alfredo Di Stéfano | Real Madrid (1956, 1957, 1958, 1959, 1960) |
| 5 | (Spain) José María Zárraga | Real Madrid (1956, 1957, 1958, 1959, 1960) |
| 5 | (Italy) Alessandro Costacurta | Milan (1989, 1990, 1994, 2003, 2007) |
| 5 | (Italy) Paolo Maldini | Milan (1989, 1990, 1994, 2003, 2007) |
| 5 | (Portugal) Cristiano Ronaldo | Manchester United (2008); Real Madrid (2014, 2016, 2017, 2018) |
| 5 | (Wales) Gareth Bale | Real Madrid (2014, 2016, 2017, 2018, 2022) |
| 5 | (France) Karim Benzema | Real Madrid (2014, 2016, 2017, 2018, 2022) |
| 5 | (Brazil) Casemiro | Real Madrid (2014, 2016, 2017, 2018, 2022) |
| 5 | (Brazil) Marcelo | Real Madrid (2014, 2016, 2017, 2018, 2022) |
| 5 | (Spain) Lucas Vázquez | Real Madrid (2016, 2017, 2018, 2022, 2024) |
| 4 | (Spain) Joseíto | Real Madrid (1956, 1957, 1958, 1959) |
| 4 | (Spain) Enrique Mateos | Real Madrid (1957, 1958, 1959, 1960) |
| 4 | (Spain) Juan Santisteban | Real Madrid (1957, 1958, 1959, 1960) |
| 4 | (Uruguay) (Spain) José Santamaría | Real Madrid (1958, 1959, 1960, 1966) |
| 4 | (England) Phil Neal | Liverpool (1977, 1978, 1981, 1984) |
| 4 | (Netherlands) Clarence Seedorf | Ajax (1995); Real Madrid (1998); Milan (2003, 2007) |
| 4 | (Spain) Andrés Iniesta | Barcelona (2006, 2009, 2011, 2015) |
| 4 | (Argentina) Lionel Messi | Barcelona (2006, 2009, 2011, 2015) |
| 4 | (Spain) Xavi | Barcelona (2006, 2009, 2011, 2015) |
| 4 | (Spain) Gerard Piqué | Manchester United (2008); Barcelona (2009, 2011, 2015) |
| 4 | (Spain) Sergio Ramos | Real Madrid (2014, 2016, 2017, 2018) |
| 4 | (Spain) Isco | Real Madrid (2014, 2016, 2017, 2018) |
| 4 | (France) Raphaël Varane | Real Madrid (2014, 2016, 2017, 2018) |
| 4 | (Croatia) Mateo Kovačić | Real Madrid (2016, 2017, 2018); Chelsea (2021) |
| 4 | (Austria) David Alaba | Bayern Munich (2013, 2020); Real Madrid (2022, 2024) |

=== Most appearances ===
As of 4 November 2026

Players taking part in the 2026–27 UEFA Champions League are highlighted in bold.
The table below does not include appearances made in the qualification stage of the competition.

| Rank | Player | Nation | Apps | Years | Club(s) (Apps) |
|---|---|---|---|---|---|
| 1 | Cristiano Ronaldo | Portugal | 183 | 2003–2022 | Manchester United (59), Real Madrid (101), Juventus (23) |
| 2 | Iker Casillas | Spain | 177 | 1999–2019 | Real Madrid (150), Porto (27) |
| 3 | **Manuel Neuer** | Germany | 164 | 2007– | Schalke 04 (22), **Bayern Munich** (142) |
| 4 | Lionel Messi | Argentina | 163 | 2004–2023 | Barcelona (149), Paris Saint-Germain (14) |
| 4 | Thomas Müller | Germany | 163 | 2009–2025 | Bayern Munich |
| 6 | Karim Benzema | France | 152 | 2005–2023 | Lyon (19), Real Madrid (133) |
| 7 | Xavi | Spain | 151 | 1998–2015 | Barcelona |
| 7 | Toni Kroos | Germany | 151 | 2008–2024 | Bayern Munich (41), Real Madrid (110) |
| 9 | Robert Lewandowski | Poland | 144 | 2011–2026 | Borussia Dortmund (28), Bayern Munich (78), Barcelona (38) |
| 10 | Raúl | Spain | 142 | 1995–2011 | Real Madrid (130), Schalke 04 (12) |
| 10 | Sergio Ramos | Spain | 142 | 2005–2023 | Real Madrid (129), Paris Saint-Germain (8), Sevilla (5) |
| 10 | Luka Modrić | Croatia | 142 | 2010–2025 | Tottenham Hotspur (8), Real Madrid (134) |

=== Most goals ===
As of 4 November 2026

A ‡ indicates the player was from the European Cup era.
Players taking part in the 2026–27 UEFA Champions League are highlighted in bold.
The table below does not include goals scored in the qualification stage of the competition.

| Rank | Player | Goals | Apps | Ratio | Years | Club(s) (Goals/Apps) |
|---|---|---|---|---|---|---|
| 1 | (Portugal) Cristiano Ronaldo | 140 | 183 | 0.77 | 2003–2022 | Manchester United (21/59), Real Madrid (105/101), Juventus (14/23) |
| 2 | (Argentina) Lionel Messi | 129 | 163 | 0.79 | 2005–2023 | Barcelona (120/149), Paris Saint-Germain (9/14) |
| 3 | (Poland) Robert Lewandowski | 109 | 144 | 0.76 | 2011–2026 | Borussia Dortmund (17/28), Bayern Munich (69/78), Barcelona (23/38) |
| 4 | (France) Karim Benzema | 90 | 152 | 0.59 | 2005–2023 | Lyon (12/19), Real Madrid (78/133) |
| 5 | (France) **Kylian Mbappé** | 74 | 102 | 0.73 | 2016– | Monaco (6/9), Paris Saint-Germain (42/64), **Real Madrid** (26/29) |
| 6 | (Spain) Raúl | 71 | 142 | 0.50 | 1995–2011 | Real Madrid (66/130), Schalke 04 (5/12) |
| 7 | (Norway) **Erling Haaland** | 62 | 61 | 1.02 | 2019– | Red Bull Salzburg (8/6), Borussia Dortmund (15/13), **Manchester City** (39/42) |
| 8 | (England) **Harry Kane** | 58 | 74 | 0.78 | 2016– | Tottenham Hotspur (21/32), **Bayern Munich** (37/42) |
| 9 | (Germany) Thomas Müller | 57 | 163 | 0.35 | 2009–2025 | Bayern Munich |
| 10 | (Netherlands) Ruud van Nistelrooy | 56 | 73 | 0.77 | 1998–2009 | PSV Eindhoven (8/11), Manchester United (35/43), Real Madrid (13/19) |

=== Most assists ===
As of 4 November 2026

Players taking part in the 2026–27 UEFA Champions League are highlighted in bold

| Rank | Player | Assists | Apps | Ratio | Years | Club(s) (Assists/Apps) |
|---|---|---|---|---|---|---|
| 1 | (Portugal) Cristiano Ronaldo | 42 | 183 | 0.22 | 2003–2022 | Manchester United, Real Madrid, Juventus |
| 2 | (Argentina) Ángel Di María | 41 | 116 | 0.35 | 2010–2025 | Real Madrid, Paris Saint-Germain, Juventus, Benfica |
| 3 | (Argentina) Lionel Messi | 40 | 163 | 0.25 | 2005–2023 | Barcelona, Paris Saint-Germain |
| 4 | (Brazil) Neymar | 33 | 81 | 0.41 | 2013–2023 | Barcelona, Paris Saint-Germain |
| 5 | (Belgium) **Kevin De Bruyne** | 32 | 83 | 0.39 | 2011– | Genk, Chelsea, Manchester City, **Napoli** |
| 5 | (Brazil) **Vinícius Júnior** | 32 | 86 | 0.38 | 2018– | **Real Madrid** |
| 7 | (Wales) Ryan Giggs | 31 | 141 | 0.22 | 1990–2014 | Manchester United |
| 8 | (Spain) Xavi | 30 | 151 | 0.20 | 1998–2015 | Barcelona |
| 8 | (Germany) Thomas Müller | 30 | 163 | 0.19 | 2009–2025 | Bayern Munich |
| 10 | (Spain) Andrés Iniesta | 29 | 130 | 0.22 | 2002–2018 | Barcelona |
| 10 | (France) Karim Benzema | 29 | 152 | 0.19 | 2005-2023 | Lyon, Real Madrid |

== Awards ==
=== Player of the Season ===
Starting from the 2021–22 edition, UEFA introduced the UEFA Champions League Player of the Season award.

The jury is composed of the coaches of the clubs that participated in the group stage of the competition, as well as 55 journalists selected by the European Sports Media (ESM) group, one from each UEFA member association.

UEFA Champions League Player of the Season
| Season | Player | Club |
|---|---|---|
| 2021–22 | (France) Karim Benzema | (Spain) Real Madrid |
| 2022–23 | (Spain) Rodri | (England) Manchester City |
| 2023–24 | (Brazil) Vinícius Júnior | (Spain) Real Madrid |
| 2024–25 | (France) Ousmane Dembélé | (France) Paris Saint-Germain |
| 2025–26 | (Georgia (country)) Khvicha Kvaratskhelia | (France) Paris Saint-Germain |

=== Young Player of the Season ===
In the same season, UEFA also introduced the UEFA Champions League Young Player of the Season award.

UEFA Champions League Young Player of the Season
| Season | Player | Club |
|---|---|---|
| 2021–22 | (Brazil) Vinícius Júnior | (Spain) Real Madrid |
| 2022–23 | (Georgia (country)) Khvicha Kvaratskhelia | (Italy) Napoli |
| 2023–24 | (England) Jude Bellingham | (Spain) Real Madrid |
| 2024–25 | (France) Désiré Doué | (France) Paris Saint-Germain |
| 2025–26 | (Turkey) Arda Güler | (Spain) Real Madrid |

== See also ==
- FIFA Club World Cup
- AFC Champions League Elite – Asian equivalent
- CAF Champions League – African equivalent
- CONCACAF Champions Cup – North, Central America and Caribbean equivalent
- Copa Libertadores – South American equivalent
- OFC Professional League – Oceania equivalent
