= ChickLit =

- Directed by: Tony Britten
- Written by: Tony Britten
- Starring: Christian McKay; Dakota Blue Richards; Miles Jupp; Eileen Atkins; John Hurt
- Release date: 2 September 2016
- Running time: 96 minutes
- Country: United Kingdom
- Language: English

ChickLit is a 2016 British comedy film written and directed by Tony Britten and starring Christian McKay, Dakota Blue Richards, Miles Jupp, Eileen Atkins and John Hurt.

== Cast ==
- Christian McKay as David Rose
- Dakota Blue Richards as Zoe
- Caroline Catz as Jen
- David Troughton as Justin
- Miles Jupp as Marcus
- John Hurt as Francis Bonar
- Eileen Atkins as Peggy Law
- Niamh Cusack as Claire

== Release ==
The film was released in the United Kingdom on September 2, 2016.

== Reception ==
The film has a 13% rating on Rotten Tomatoes based on eight reviews. Kevin Maher of The Times awarded the film zero stars out of five. Wendy Ide of The Observer awarded the film one star out of five. David Parkinson of Radio Times awarded the film two stars out of five. Peter Bradshaw of The Guardian also awarded the film two stars out of five. Geoffrey Macnab of The Independent awarded the film two stars.
