= In Love with Alma Cogan =

- Theatrical release poster
- Directed by: Tony Britten
- Screenplay by: Tony Britten
- Produced by: Anwen Rees-Myers; Katya Mordaunt
- Starring: Roger Lloyd-Pack; Niamh Cusack; Gwyneth Strong
- Cinematography: Ole Brett Birkeland
- Edited by: Jeremy Brettingham
- Music by: Tony Britten
- Production company: Capriol Films
- Release dates: 11 October 2011 (Dinard Festival of British Film, France)
- Running time: 99 minutes
- Country: United Kingdom
- Language: English
- Budget: £200,000

In Love with Alma Cogan is a 2011 British romantic comedy film written and directed by Tony Britten. It was filmed in and around the Pavilion Theatre, Cromer Pier, Norfolk, England.

== Plot ==
The film revolves around Norman, a world-weary manager of a pier theatre in a seaside resort. Norman has worked in the theatre all his life, but will not accept that the local council, which owns the theatre, is planning to install more commercial management in an attempt to boost audience numbers. As the story unfolds, he realises it may be time to move on and put behind him the ghost of 1950s and 1960s singer Alma Cogan, who performed at the theatre many years before. Sandra, his devoted long-suffering assistant, and Norman decide to leave the theatre to fulfil her dream of being a professional singer and unexpectedly enjoy a late blossoming romance.

== Cast ==
- Roger Lloyd-Pack – Norman
- Niamh Cusack – Sandra
- Gwyneth Strong – Laura
- Neil McCaul – Eddie
- Christian Brassington – George
- Keith Barron – Cedric
- Simon Green – Julian
- Gary Martin – Larry
- Ann Firbank – Mrs. Craske
- Terry Molloy – Barry Bates
- Catrine Kirkman – Alma Collins
- Daniel Bardwell – Young Norman
- Tim Bell – Mr. Whipit
- Kris Dillon Jr – Adonis
- John Hurt – Master of Ceremonies
- Tom Carver – Jack 'the Hat' McVitie

== Awards ==
In March 2012 at the Canada International Film Festival the film won an Award of Excellence.
