= Niamh Cusack =

Irish actress (born 1959)

- Born: 20 October 1959 (age 66); Dalkey, County Dublin, Ireland
- Occupation: Actress
- Years active: 1984–present
- Spouse: Finbar Lynch
- Children: Calam Lynch
- Parents: Cyril Cusack (father); Maureen Kiely (mother)
- Relatives: Sinéad Cusack (sister); Sorcha Cusack (sister); Pádraig Cusack (brother); Catherine Cusack (half-sister); Richard Boyd Barrett (nephew); Max Irons (nephew)

Niamh Cusack (/ˈniːv/ NEEV; born 20 October 1959) is an Irish actress. Born into a family with deep roots in the performing arts, she has performed extensively with the Royal Shakespeare Company, the Royal National Theatre, and other prominent theatre ensembles.

Cusack is best known for her television role as Dr. Kate Rowan in the British series Heartbeat (1992–1995). Her further screen credits include the medical drama Always and Everyone (1999–2002), the animated series The World of Peter Rabbit and Friends (1992–1995), and films such as The Closer You Get (2000), Testament of Youth (2014), and The Ghoul (2016). Notable television appearances include episodes of Agatha Christie's Marple ("4:50 from Paddington", 2004), Midsomer Murders (2008), A Touch of Frost (2010), Death in Paradise (2021), and The Tower (2023), alongside performances in dramas like In Love with Alma Cogan (2011), Departure (2015), and The Virtues (2019).

Cusack received a nomination for an IFTA Award for her role in the television film Too Good to be True (2003).

== Early life ==
Niamh Cusack was born on 20 October 1959 in Dalkey, County Dublin, Ireland. She is the daughter of actor Cyril Cusack and actress Maureen Cusack (formerly Mary Margaret Kiely). Among her siblings are actresses Sinéad Cusack and Sorcha Cusack, as well as half-sister Catherine Cusack. Her brothers include Paul Cusack, a television producer, and Pádraig Cusack, a producer for the Royal National Theatre of Great Britain.

== Education ==
Cusack received a bilingual education in Dublin, and is fluent in both Irish (Gaeilge) and English. Initially pursuing a career in music, she trained as a professional flautist and earned a scholarship to study at the Royal Academy of Music in London. Following this, she worked as a freelance musician with the RTÉ National Symphony Orchestra and the RTÉ Concert Orchestra. She later transitioned to acting, securing a place at the Guildhall School of Music and Drama to undertake formal training.

== Acting career ==
=== Theatre ===
Cusack began her stage career in 1985, playing Irina in Kasparov Wrede's production of Anton Chekhov's Three Sisters at the Royal Exchange, Manchester, followed by portraying Desdemona opposite Ben Kingsley in the Royal Shakespeare Company (RSC) production of Othello. In 1986, she starred as Juliet opposite Sean Bean's Romeo in the RSC's Romeo and Juliet.

Throughout the 1990s, Cusack performed in prominent London productions, including Nora Clitheroe in Sam Mendes's staging of Seán O'Casey's The Plough and the Stars at the Young Vic, Rosalind in As You Like It at the Barbican Centre, Flora Crewe in Tom Stoppard's Indian Ink at the Aldwych Theatre, and a role in Jean Genet's The Maids at the Donmar Warehouse. In 2003, she played Portia in Shakespeare's The Merchant of Venice at the Chichester Festival Theatre, directed by Gale Edwards.

In 2004, she joined the National Theatre's adaptation of Philip Pullman's His Dark Materials as Serafina Pekkala, alongside Anna Maxwell Martin, Ben Wishaw, and Patricia Hodge. In 2007, She returned to the National Theatre in 2007 for The Enchantment and starred in Mark O'Rowe's Crestfall at Theatre503. In 2009, she portrayed Maggie in the Old Vic's revival of Brian Friel's Dancing at Lughnasa alongside her husband, Finbar Lynch. In 2010, she played Catherine Dickens in Andersen's English, by Sebastian Barry.

In 2011, she appeared in The Painter by Rebecca Lenkiewicz, opposite Toby Jones and followed it with the role of Edith Davenport in Cause Célèbre by Terence Rattigan and the Widow Quin in The Playboy of the Western World by J.M. Synge, both at the Old Vic. Cusack was nominated for a Whatsonstage.com Award in 2012 in the Best Supporting Actress in a Play category for The Playboy of the Western World role.

In August 2012, Cusack rejoined the National Theatre for the role of Siobhan in the world première of the stage adaptation of Mark Haddon's book The Curious Incident of the Dog in the Night-Time, adapted by Simon Stephens and directed by Marianne Elliott. The show premièred on 2 August 2012. It also starred Luke Treadaway as Christopher, Nicola Walker as his mother Judy, Paul Ritter as his father Ed and Una Stubbs as Mrs. Alexander. The Curious Case of the Dog in the Night-Time secured the most nominations, with eight, for the 2013 Olivier Awards. The show transferred to the Apollo Theatre in Shaftesbury Avenue, London on 1 March 2013 with Cusack reprising her role.

Cusack returned to the London stage in 2016 as Paulina in The Winter's Tale at the Globe and Owen McCafferty's Unfaithful at Found 111 in the West End.

In 2017, she was cast in the leading role of Lenú in the world premiere of the stage adaptation of the multi-award-winning tetralogy of books My Brilliant Friend by Elena Ferrante at the Rose Theatre, which transferred to the Olivier Theatre of the Royal National Theatre in 2019. In between the transfer in 2018, Cusack returned to the Royal Shakespeare Company in another leading role as Lady Macbeth opposite Christopher Eccleston which transferred to London's Barbican Theatre. In the first stage adaptation of Kazuo Ishiguro's novel The Remains of the Day by Barney Norris, Cusack was cast as Miss Kenton. Cusack also returned television as Janine in the acclaimed 4-part series The Virtues directed by Shane Meadows.

In 2022, Cusack appeared at Abbey Theatre in Brian Friel's Faith Healer opposite Aidan Gillen and directed by Joe Dowling (which had been postponed owing to COVID-19). For her performance, she was nominated for Best Actress in a Support Role at the Irish Times Theatre Awards. In 2022, she starred as Gertrude in Hamlet by Bristol Old Vic along with husband Finbar Lynch. In 2023, she led the cast in the first major revival of Polly Stenham's That Face at London's Orange Tree Theatre.

=== Film and television ===
In 1989, Cusack appeared in the ninth episode of the first series of Agatha Christie's Poirot entitled The King of Clubs. She starred as Dr. Kate Rowan in the popular 1990s television drama series Heartbeat (1992–1995), set in the 1960s in the North Riding of Yorkshire. She left the show after becoming pregnant. Cusack was nominated in the category of Best Actress in a TV Drama in 2004 at the 2nd Irish Film & Television Awards for her performance in the Cartlon Television TV film Too Good to Be True.

She played Christine Fletcher in Always and Everyone (1999–2002), a British accident and emergency medical series alongside Martin Shaw; Grace Haslett in the miniseries State of Mind, alongside Andrew Lincoln; Julie Flynn in the one-off drama Rhinoceros alongside Robson Green and Beatrix Potter in the TV series The World of Peter Rabbit and Friends (1992–1995). She played Wodehouse's Bobbie Wickham in the ITV series Jeeves and Wooster (1990–1993). She was also in Agatha Christie's Marple series ("4:50 from Paddington", 2004), and has appeared in episodes of Midsomer Murders (2008) and A Touch of Frost (2010), alongside David Jason. She starred in the film The Closer You Get (2000), alongside Seán McGinley. She appeared in Testament of Youth (2014), Departure (2015), Chick Lit (2016), and in the British psychological crime horror The Ghoul (2016).

In 2021, she appeared in two episodes of Death in Paradise (2021). In 2023, she appeared in series two of The Tower, alongside Tamzin Outhwaite.

=== Radio ===
In January 2013, she was nominated for a BBC Audio Drama Award in the Best Supporting Actress category for The Man with Wings by Rachel Joyce, produced by Gordon House, Goldhawk Essential Productions for Radio 4. Cusack played Molly Bloom in James Joyce's Ulysses for BBC Radio 4 which aired a new 9-part adaptation dramatised by Robin Brooks, produced and directed by Jeremy Mortimer. The series began on Bloomsday (16 June) 2012.

== Personal life ==
Cusack is married to the actor Finbar Lynch. They met when rehearsing in Dublin in the theatre production of Three Sisters in 1990. They have one son, actor Calam Lynch. Cusack is a keen athlete and has run the London Marathon for the charity St Joseph's Hospice in 2003.

== Filmography ==
Film
Year	Film	Role	Notes
1988	Paris by Night	Jenny Swanton	dir. David Hare
1990	Fools of Fortune	Josephine	dir. Pat O'Connor
1992	The Playboys	Brigid Maguire	
2000	The Closer You Get	Kate	dir. Aileen Ritchie
2007	Matterhorn	Marie	Short film
2009	Five Minutes of Heaven	Alistair's Mum – 1975	dir. Oliver Hirschbiegel
2010	The Kid	1980 school nurse	
2010	Hereafter	Marcus' foster mother	dir. Clint Eastwood
2011	In Love with Alma Cogan	Sandra	dir. Tony Britten
2012	The Best of Men	Sister Edwards	dir. Tim Whitby
2014	Testament of Youth	Sister Jones	dir. James Kent
2015	Departure	Sally	
2016	ChickLit	Claire	dir. Tony Britten
2016	The Ghoul	Fisher	dir. Gareth Tunley
2020	Returning	Mum	dir. Lucy Bridger
2023	Unwelcome	Niamh	dir. Jon Wright
2023	In the Land of Saints and Sinners	Rita	dir. Robert Lorenz
2024	We Live in Time	Sylvia	
2024	Four Mothers	Maura	
2026	Midwinter Break	Kathy	
2026	Once Upon a Time in a Cinema	Mrs. Healy	
Television
Year	Title	Role	Notes
1988	A Shadow on the Sun		TV film
1988	Screen Two	Denise Slipper	Episode: "Lucky Sunil"
1989	Agatha Christie's Poirot	Valerie Saintclair	Episode: "The King of Clubs"
1991	Jeeves and Wooster	Roberta 'Bobbie' Wickham	Episode: "Wooster with a Wife (or, Jeeves the Matchmaker)"
1991	Chalkface	Melanie	7 episodes
1992	Angels	Ellen	TV film
1992–1995	Heartbeat	Dr. Kate Rowan	49 episodes
1992–1995	The World of Peter Rabbit and Friends	Beatrix Potter	9 episodes
1997	Living Proof – Cause of Death	Mary McGuire	TV series documentary
1998	Colour Blind	Bridget Paterson	Mini-Series
1999	Rhinoceros	Julie Flynn	TV film
1999–2002	Always and Everyone	Christine Fletcher	37 episodes
2000	Little Bird	Ellen Hall	TV film
2003	State of Mind	Dr. Grace Hazlett	TV film
2003	Loving You	Chloe	TV film
2003	Too Good to Be True	Tina	TV film – IFTA Awards: Best Actress in Film or TV (Nom)
2004	Agatha Christie's Marple	Emma Crackenthorpe	Episode: "4.50 from Paddington"
2005	The Last Detective	Gill	Episode: "Friends Reunited"
2007	Fallen Angel	Vanessa Byfield	Episode: "The Judgement of Strangers"
2008	Midsomer Murders	Penny Galsworthy	Episode: "Days of Misrule"
2010	A Touch of Frost	Sally Berland	2 episodes
2010	Lewis	Dr. Ellen Jacoby	Episode: "Falling Darkness"
2012	Henry IV, Part II	Lady Northumberland	TV film
2012	The Curious Incident of the Dog in the Night-Time	Siobhan	TV film for National Theatre Live
2014	New Tricks	Joanne Gibson	Episode: "In Vino Veritas"
2016	Rebellion	Nelly Cosgrave	4 episodes
2016	Silent Witness	Sylvie Blake	2 episodes
2018	Macbeth	Lady Macbeth	Royal Shakespeare Company
2019	The Virtues	Janine	2 episodes, directed by Shane Meadows
2020	Father Brown	Roisin Crayford	Episode: "The Numbers of the Beast"
2021	Death in Paradise	Maggie O'Connell	2 episodes
2021	Brassic	Clodagh	1 episode
2023	The Tower	Claire Mills	Series two
2023	Archie	Alma Hitchcock	Episode #1.2
2024	Big Mood	Gillian	2 episodes
2025	I, Jack Wright	Annie Rouse	Series regular

== Selected theatre credits ==
- 1985: Othello as Desdemona (Royal Shakespeare Company/Barbican, London)
- 1985: Mary, After the Queen (Royal Shakespeare Company)
- 1985: Anything Goes (Royal Shakespeare Company)
- 1985: Three Sisters as Irina (Royal Exchange, Manchester)
- 1986: Romeo and Juliet as Juliet (Royal Shakespeare Company/Barbican, London)
- 1987: The Art of Success (Royal Shakespeare Company/Barbican, London)
- 1987: Portrait of a Marriage (Royal Shakespeare Company/Barbican Theatre, London)
- 1988: The Tutor (Old Vic, London) – Alongside half sister Catherine Cusack
- 1988: The Admirable Crichton (West End – Theatre Royal Haymarket, London)
- 1990: Three Sisters as Irina (Gate Theatre, Dublin & Royal Court Theatre, London – Alongside sisters Sinead Cusack (Masha) & Sorcha Cusack (Olga) & her father Cyril Cusack)
- 1991: The Plough and the Stars as Nora Clitheroe (Young Vic Theatre, London)
- 1991: The Phoenix (Bush Theatre, London)
- 1993: A Doll's House as Nora (Gate Theatre, Dublin)
- 1995: Indian Ink as Flora (West End – Aldwych Theatre)
- 1996: As You Like It as Rosalind (Royal Shakespeare Company/Barbican, London)
- 1996: The Learned Ladies as Armande (Royal Shakespeare Company/Barbican, London)
- 1997: The Maids (Donmar Warehouse, London)
- 1998: Nabokov's Gloves (Hampstead Theatre, London)
- 2003: The Merchant of Venice as Portia (Chichester Festival Theatre)
- 2003: His Dark Materials as Serafina Pekkala (Royal National Theatre, London)
- 2005: Breathing Corpses (Royal Court Theatre/Jerwood Theatre Upstairs, London)
- 2006: Mammals (The Bush, London)
- 2007: The Way of the World (Royal Theatre, Northampton)
- 2007: The Enchantment (Royal National Theatre, London)
- 2007: Ghosts as Mrs Alving (Gate Theatre – Notting Hill, London)
- 2007: Crestfall (Theatre503, London)
- 2008: The Portrait of a Lady (Theatre Royal Bath)
- 2009: Dancing at Lughnasa as Maggie (West End – Old Vic Theatre)
- 2010: Anderson's English (Hampstead Theatre/Out of Joint and on tour)
- 2010: Women, Power and Politics (Tricycle Theatre, London)
- 2011: Cause Célèbre (West End – Old Vic Theatre)
- 2011: The Painter (Arcola Theatre, London)
- 2011: The Playboy of the Western World as Pegeen Mike (West End – Old Vic Theatre)
- 2012: The Curious Incident of the Dog in the Night-Time as Siobhan (Royal National Theatre, London)
- 2013: The Curious Incident of the Dog in the Night-Time as Siobhan (West End – Apollo Theatre)
- 2014: Afterplay as Sonya (Crucible Theatre, Sheffield)
- 2016: The Winter's Tale as Paulina (Shakespeare's Globe, London)
- 2016: Unfaithful (Theatre 111, London)
- 2017: My Brilliant Friend as Lenú (Rose Theatre, London)
- 2018: Macbeth as Lady Macbeth (Royal Shakespeare Company/Barbican, London)
- 2019: The Remains of the Day as Kenton (Out of Joint/UK Tour)
- 2019: My Brilliant Friend as Lenú (Royal National Theatre, London)
- 2022: Faith Healer as Grace (Abbey Theatre, Dublin)
- 2022: Hamlet as Gertrude (Bristol Old Vic)
- 2023: That Face as Martha (Orange Tree Theatre, London)

== Awards and nominations ==
- Nominated: BBC Audio Drama Awards 2013 – Best Supporting Actress for The Man with Wings by Rachel Joyce, for BBC Radio 4
- Nominated: Whatsonstage.com Awards 2012 – Best Supporting Actress in a Play for Playboy of the Western World at Old Vic
- Nominated: Irish Film & Television Academy IFTA 2004 – Best Actress in a TV Drama for Too Good to be True
- Winner: Received an Irish Life Award
- Winner: Received an Irish Post Award
- Nominated: Irish Times Theatre Awards 2021/22 – Best Actress in a Supporting Role for Faith Healer by Brian Friel at the Abbey Theatre, Dublin
