= UEFA Champions League Anthem =

Official anthem of the UEFA Champions League

- Official anthem of UEFA Champions League
- Lyrics: Tony Britten, 1992
- Music: Tony Britten, adapted from George Frideric Handel, 1992
- Adopted: 1992; 34 years ago

Audio sample
- The last two verses of the UEFA Champions League Anthem (version used until 2024): file; help

The UEFA Champions League Anthem, officially titled as simply the "Champions League", is the official anthem of the UEFA Champions League, written by English composer Tony Britten in 1992, and based on George Frideric Handel's Zadok the Priest. It was also the official anthem of the UEFA Women's Champions League from its creation in 2001 to the 2021 creation of an independent anthem. The complete anthem is about three minutes long, and has two short verses and the chorus. The lyrics are in UEFA's three official languages: English, French, and German. The chorus is set to the exclamations "Die Meister! Die Besten! Les grandes équipes! The champions!"

The anthem is played inside the stadium before the start of each UEFA Champions League match, in addition to the beginning and end of television broadcasts of the games. Special vocal versions of the anthem have been performed live at the UEFA Champions League final. UEFA's official website states, "the anthem is now almost as iconic as the trophy."

== Composition ==
In 1991, UEFA instructed its commercial partner Television Event and Media Marketing (TEAM) to develop new ways of branding the European Cup (which would be renamed the UEFA Champions League in 1992). This process resulted in the Champions League's anthem, as well as its "starball" logo and distinctive house colours. It was first played during the 1992–93 season.

"Magic... it's magic above all else. When you hear the anthem it captivates you straight away."

— Zinedine Zidane

The anthem was written by English composer Tony Britten in 1992, adapted from George Frideric Händel's anthem Zadok the Priest, which is traditionally performed at the coronation of British monarchs. In a 2013 newspaper interview, Britten stated that "I had a commercials agent and they approached me to write something anthemic and because it was just after The Three Tenors at the World Cup in Italy so classical music was all the rage. Hooliganism was a major, major problem and UEFA wanted to take the game into a completely different area altogether. There's a rising string phase which I pinched from Handel and then I wrote my own tune. It has a kind of Handelian feel to it but I like to think it's not a total rip-off." The composing process took "just a matter of days". Britten also mentioned that he does not own the rights to the anthem, which are retained by UEFA, but he receives royalties when it is used.

For the recording used in television transmissions of UEFA Champions League matches and events, the piece was performed by London's Royal Philharmonic Orchestra and sung by the Academy of St Martin in the Fields Chorus. The chorus is in UEFA's three official languages: English, French, and German.

Anthony King writes:

The majestic music which rises to an impressive major key crescendo signifies the installation of a new head of state. The baroque music of the Zadok anthem associates the Champions League with the monarchies of Ancien Regime Europe. The baroque music also interconnects with the silver house colours, for the aristocratic connotations evoked by the silver are reflected and affirmed in this noble music. It is notable here that the anthem is associated with the (silver) cup itself because, in the introductory sequences, the music reaches its climax just as the footage of the Cup being lifted at the end of the previous year's competition is shown. It is interesting that the anthem is orchestrated so that the most prominent instruments at this climax are horns; they communicate a shining metallic sound which musically reflects the trophy itself. Music and colours merge together as one dense signifier, communicating a concept of silver in both sound and vision.

Prior to the 2024–25 edition, the anthem was slightly refined by Tony Britten and re-recorded as part of a new brand identity for the UEFA Champions League.

== Lyrics ==
Ce sont les meilleures équipes
Sie sind die allerbesten Mannschaften
The main event

Die Meister
Die Besten
Les grandes équipes
The champions

Une grande réunion
Eine große sportliche Veranstaltung
The main event

Ils sont les meilleurs
Sie sind die Besten
These are the champions

Die Meister
Die Besten
Les grandes équipes
The champions

== Uses ==
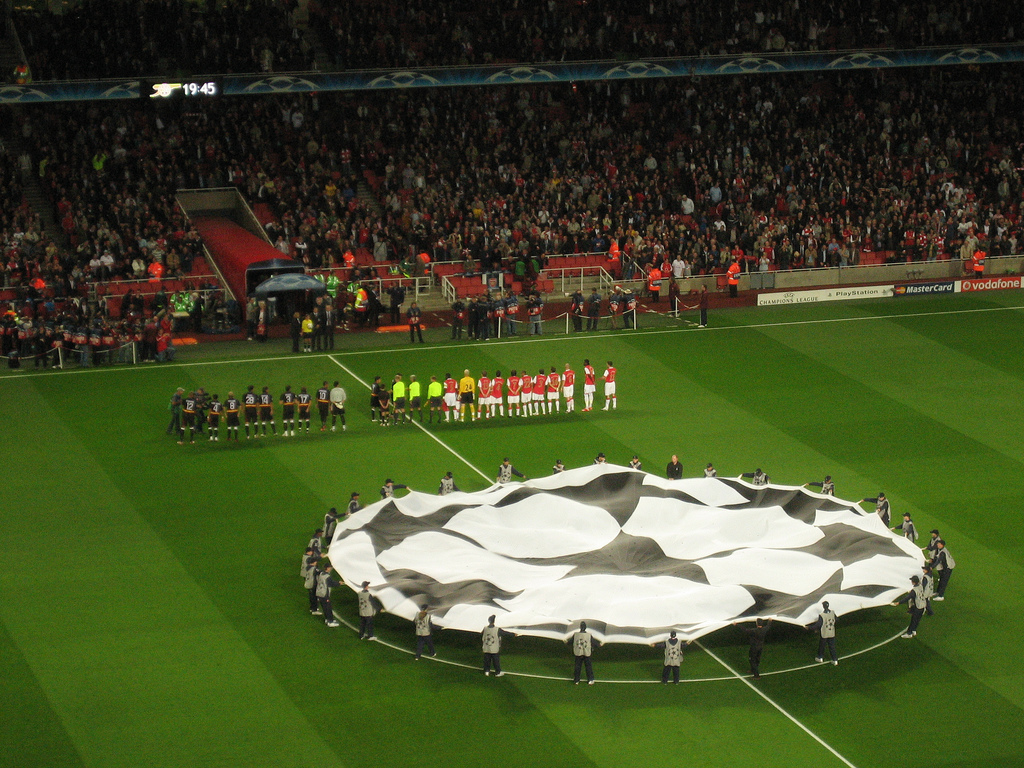
The Champions League anthem is played before the two teams shake hands prior to the start of each match

The anthem's chorus is played before each UEFA Champions League game as the two teams are lined up, as well as at the beginning and end of television broadcasts of the matches, and when the winning team lifts the trophy after the final. From the 2024–25 season, an upbeat, triumphant version of the anthem is played when the trophy is lifted. Special vocal versions have been performed live at the Champions League final with lyrics in other languages, changing over to the host country's language for the chorus. These versions were performed by:

- Amici Forever (Manchester 2003)
- Andrea Bocelli (Main lyrics: Rome 1996; Italian: Rome 2009, Milan 2016 and Cardiff 2017)
- Juan Diego Flórez (Spanish; Madrid 2010)
- All Angels (Wembley 2011)
- Jonas Kaufmann and David Garrett (Munich 2012)
- Mariza (Lisbon 2014; unlike the previous final performers, Mariza sang the main lyric of the anthem)
- Nina Maria Fischer and Manuel Gomez Ruiz (Berlin 2015)

In the 2013 final at Wembley Stadium, the chorus was played twice. In the 2018 and 2019 finals, held in Kyiv and Madrid respectively, the instrumental version of the chorus was played, by 2Cellos (2018) and Asturia Girls (2019), while the 2020 and 2021 finals used the pre-recorded anthem's chorus instead, without any live performances due to the COVID-19 pandemic. The 2022 and 2024 finals similarly used a standard pre-recorded version of the anthem. In the 2023 and 2026 finals, held in Istanbul and Budapest respectively, Hungarian pianist Ádám György performed the piano version of the anthem.

The complete anthem is about three minutes long, and has two short verses and a chorus. In addition to the anthem, there is also entrance music, which contains parts of the anthem itself, which is played as teams enter the field. The anthem has been released commercially in its original version on iTunes and Spotify with the title of Champions League Theme. In 2018, composer Hans Zimmer remixed the anthem with rapper Vince Staples for EA Sports' video game FIFA 19, with it also featuring in the game's reveal trailer.

== See also ==
- UEFA Europa League Anthem
