= Finbar Lynch =

Irish actor (born 1959)

- Born: 28 August 1959 (age 67); Dublin, Ireland
- Other name: Barry Lynch
- Occupation: Actor
- Years active: 1982–present
- Spouse: Niamh Cusack
- Children: Calam Lynch
- Relatives: Cyril Cusack (father-in-law); Maureen Cusack (mother-in-law)

Finbar Lynch (born 28 August 1959) is an Irish actor.

== Early life ==
Lynch was born in Dublin and, at the age of 11, moved with his family to the village of Inverin, County Galway, where his father ran a clothing factory under a scheme to encourage business investment in Gaeltacht areas. Lynch has two brothers.

== Career ==
Back in Dublin at the age of 18, Lynch doorknocked local theatres seeking acting work but was turned down due to lack of experience. Working as a stagehand, he successfully auditioned for a minor role in the Tennessee Williams play A Streetcar Named Desire, which started off his acting career. In 1999, Lynch was nominated for the Tony Award for Best Featured Actor in a Play and Drama Desk Award for Outstanding Actor in a Play for his performance as Canary Jim in the Broadway run of the rediscovered Williams play Not About Nightingales.

Lynch's television work includes recurring appearances in the soap opera Glenroe, Proof, Breathless and the miniseries Small World; as Doctor Martin Wells in the Bourne spin-off television series Treadstone, along with as minor appearances in Waking the Dead, Dalziel and Pascoe, Inspector George Gently, DCI Banks, Game of Thrones, Foyle's War, and The Mallorca Files.

In November 2025, it was announced that Lynch will star in the thriller film Banquet, directed by Galder Gaztelu-Urrutia, alongside Meghann Fahy, Alfie Williams, and Corey Mylchreest, and will be produced by David Yates.

== Personal life ==
Lynch is married to actress Niamh Cusack and they have a son, Calam Lynch, who is also an actor.

== Filmography ==
=== Film ===
Key
†	Denotes films that have not yet been released

Year	Title	Role	Notes
1983	The Schooner	Joe	
1986	Rawhead Rex	Andy Johnson	
1996	A Midsummer Night's Dream	Puck / Philostrate	
2003	To Kill a King	Cousin Henry	
2004	Mathilde	The Major	
2013	The Numbers Station	Michaels	
2015	Child 44	Doctor Boris Zarubin	
2015	Suffragette	Hugh Ellyn	
2015	Departure	Philip	
2016	Property of the State	Heffernan	
2018	Black '47	Brown	
2020	Adventures of a Mathematician	G. D. Birkhoff	
2020	The World We Knew	Carpenter	
2022	York Witches' Society	Matthias	
2023	Unwelcome	Father Brendan	
2025	Hedda	Professor Greenwood	
2025	Kapodistrias	Klemens von Metternich	
TBA	Banquet †	TBA	Filming

=== Television ===
Year	Title	Role	Notes
1982–1983	Les Poneys sauvages	George (aged 18)	4 episodes
1983–1987	Glenroe	Matt Moran	
1987	Three Wishes for Jamie	Mattie (uncredited)	Television film
1988	Small World	Persse McGarrigle	6 episodes
1994	Between the Lines	Danny McLaughlin	Episode: "Shoot to Kill"
1998	Performance	Edmund	Episode: "King Lear"
1998	The Scold's Bridle	Dave Hughes	2 episodes
1998	Riddler's Moon	Kevin Sanders	Television film
1999	Holby City	Stranger	Episode: "Tidings of Comfort and Joy"
2000	Waking the Dead	Jimmy Marshall	2 episodes
2000	Second Sight: Hide and Seek	Gavin Finn	Television film
2001	Mind Games	DCI Chris Medwynter	Television film
2001	The Lost Battalion	Pvt. Ferguson	Television film
2003	Red Cap	Liam Young	Episode: "Cold War"
2004–2005	Proof	Terry Corcoran	Main role
2005	Dalziel and Pascoe	Dave Cashman	2 episodes
2005	Born with Two Mothers	Narrator (voice)	Television film
2007	Richard Is My Boyfriend	Narrator (voice)	Television film
2007	Comedy Showcase	Concrete O'Hara	Episode: "The Eejits"
2008	Inspector George Gently	Ruairi O'Connell	Episode: "The Burning Man"
2012	Silk	Jody Farr	4 episodes
2012	The Hollow Crown	Lord Marshal	Episode: "Richard II"
2013	Breathless	Monty Meecher	5 episodes
2014	DCI Banks	Ian Bassett	2 episodes
2014	Game of Thrones	Farmer Hamlet	Episode: "Breaker of Chains"
2015	Foyle's War	Avraham Greenfeld	Episode: "Trespass"
2015	The Musketeers	Baltasar	Episode: "The Good Traitor"
2015	Antigone at the Barbican	Teiresias	Television film
2019	Treadstone	Dr. Martin Wells	3 episodes
2019	The Feed	Aiden	Episode #1.8
2019	The Mallorca Files	Paco	Episode: "The Oligarch's Icon"
2020	Devils	William Trevor	Episode #1.4
2022	Tom Clancy's Jack Ryan	Vice President Robert Fleming	3 episodes
2024	The Regime	Joseph Vernham	Episode: "The Heroes' Banquet"
