= Departure (2015 film) =

2015 LGBT coming-of-age drama film

- Theatrical release poster
- Directed by: Andrew Steggall
- Written by: Andrew Steggall
- Produced by: Pietro Greppi; Cora Palfrey; Guillaume Tobo
- Starring: Juliet Stevenson; Alex Lawther; Phénix Brossard; Finbar Lynch; Niamh Cusack
- Cinematography: Brian Fawcett
- Edited by: Dounia Sichov
- Music by: Jools Scott
- Production companies: Motion Group Pictures; Connectic Studio; Amaro Films
- Distributed by: Peccadillo Pictures (UK)
- Release dates: October 9, 2015 (BFI London Film Festival); May 20, 2016 (United Kingdom); June 9, 2016 (Cabourg Film Festival); May 31, 2017 (France)
- Running time: 109 minutes
- Countries: United Kingdom; France
- Languages: English; French

Departure is a 2015 English–French independent coming-of-age romantic drama film written and directed by Andrew Steggall in his feature directorial debut. The film stars Juliet Stevenson, Alex Lawther, Phénix Brossard, Finbar Lynch, and Niamh Cusack.

It premiered at the BFI London Film Festival on 9 October 2015 before a UK theatrical release on 20 May 2016 through Peccadillo Pictures.

== Plot ==
Beatrice (Juliet Stevenson) and her teenage son Elliot (Alex Lawther) arrive in southern France to prepare their family holiday home for sale. Both mother and son are in transitional phases: Beatrice is confronting the breakdown of her marriage, while Elliot is experiencing a sexual awakening. Elliot becomes infatuated with Clément (Phénix Brossard), a local French teenager with a rebellious streak.

Over the course of a week, the family's tensions, unspoken secrets, and shifting relationships unfold. Elliot's friendship with Clément develops into a deeper, romantic bond, mirroring Beatrice's own attempts to navigate emotional upheaval. Their stories converge in a meditation on desire, adolescence, and the dissolution of family ties.

== Cast ==
- Juliet Stevenson as Beatrice
- Alex Lawther as Elliot
- Phénix Brossard as Clément
- Niamh Cusack as Sally
- Finbar Lynch as Philip
- Patrice Juiff as François
- Guillaume Tobo as the butcher
- Danièle Catala as woman at the market

== Critical response ==
On the review aggregator website Rotten Tomatoes, 87% of 15 critics' reviews are positive, with an average rating of 7.0/10. Variety positively noted the film's score and camera work but critiqued the "pretentious" dialogue. Ryan Morris of Film Inquiry praised Lawther, Brossard, and Stevenson's performances, but criticized the visual metaphors and lack of character development.

== Awards ==
The Departure, along with Juliet Stevenson, Alex Lawther, and Phenix Brossard, received a special mention at the 2015 Dinard British Film Festival.
