= Proof (2004 TV series) =

- Title card
- Genre: Crime drama Thriller
- Created by: Tony Philpott
- Written by: Tony Philpott; Eric Deacon; Alan Whiting; Tim Loane
- Directed by: Ciaran Donnelly; Thaddeus O'Sullivan
- Starring: Finbar Lynch; Orla Brady; Charlotte Bradley; Sidse Babett Knudsen; Stuart Graham; Bryan Murray; Kate O'Toole; Cathy Belton
- Composers: John Gerard Walsh; Ray Harman
- Country of origin: Ireland
- Original language: English
- No. of seasons: 2
- No. of episodes: 8

Production
- Executive producers: Mary Callery; Tristan Lynch; Dominic Wright
- Producer: Jo Homewood
- Cinematography: Peter Robertson
- Editor: Stephen O'Connell
- Running time: 50 minutes
- Production company: Subotica

Original release
- Network: RTÉ One
- Release: 5 January 2004 – 25 April 2005

Proof is an Irish television series, co-produced by Subotica for broadcast on RTÉ; it was first broadcast on 5 January 2004. Starring Finbar Lynch and Orla Brady as investigative journalists Terry Corcoran and Maureen Boland, Proof lasted for two series, with a second series, subtitled Prescription for Murder, airing in April 2005. The series was a co-production with TV2 of Denmark, and as such, both series were broadcast in the region in 2006. Likewise, both series aired on PBS in the United States and were released on DVD in January and April 2007. In 2009, both series were broadcast by Scottish broadcaster STV.

The first series was directed by Ciaran Donnelly and the second by Thaddeus O'Sullivan. Tristan Lynch and Mary Callery acted as executive producers. Both series were filmed on location in Ireland. The series was a hit with critics and audiences alike, and became a rating success for RTÉ, becoming the channel's most-watched drama in 2004, beating off soap opera Fair City. Orla Brady also received an Irish Film and Television Award nomination for Best Actress in a TV serial in 2004, and the first series was also up for nomination for best TV serial.

== Production ==
Proof was created by Tony Philpott, who also wrote the first two episodes of the first series. Proof notably made headlines when it was discovered that Philpott's original screenplay had been "dumbed down" by network executives and some of the more politically critical elements had been removed. The screenplay was read by a Sunday Times TV critic, who noted the excisions and wrote about them in an article separate from his TV column.

The column, printed on 1 February 2004, wrote: "It could almost be the plot of a whodunit. A television station commissions a hard-hitting drama set against the sleazy backdrop of Irish political corruption. The designated writer delivers the goods with a script that station bigwigs hail as one of the grittiest and most convincing they’ve ever read. Then, somewhere between the green-lighting of the project and the first day of principal photography, the script is eviscerated. Its astringent depiction of crooked politics, Irish-style, is watered down to bland, generic mush."

== Cast ==
- Finbar Lynch as Terry Corcoran
- Orla Brady as Maureen Boland
- Charlotte Bradley as Detective Dolores Quirke
- Sidse Babett Knudsen as Nina Kurpreka (Series 1)
- Stuart Graham as Andrew O'Hara (Series 1)
- Bryan Murray as Miles Carrick (Series 1)
- Cathy Belton as Kay Corcoran (Series 1)
- Jim Norton as Ronan Corcoran (Series 1)
- Emma Bolger as Orla Boland (Series 1)
- Declan Conlan as Detective Larry Mitchell (Series 1)
- Kate O'Toole as Olivia Bernstein (Series 2)
- Dearbhla Molloy as Evelyn Boland (Series 2)
- Saoirse Ronan as Orla Boland (Series 2)
- Stanley Townsend as Patrick Mooney (Series 2)
- Conor Mullen as J.P. O'Farrell (Series 2)

== Episodes ==
=== Series 1 (2004) ===
No.	Title	Directed by	Written by	Original release date
1	"Episode 1"	Ciarán Donnelly	Tony Philpott	5 January 2004
The discovery of a connection between a small-time thief's murder and the death of a crooked accountant, piques the interest of investigative reporter Terry Corcoran. Further digging leads him into a sordid scandal involving human trafficking, high finance, and high-stakes politics.
2	"Episode 2"	Ciarán Donnelly	Tony Philpott	12 January 2004
With the election imminent, Maureen takes up her new position as Media Relations Officer at the Social Democrats HQ. Meanwhile, Erskine's body is discovered by Amy, his secretary and it appears as if he's shot himself. Nina has been up all night, worrying about her sister and looking through Club Veeda's credit card scanner that she stole from the club the night before. She identifies the owners of Club Veeda as Endigo Entertainment and tells Terry that they are running a scam, copying the numbers from credit cards into a palmtop computer. Terry advises her to take the evidence to the Gardaí and goes to gather information on Erskine's apparent suicide for an article in the Northside Chronicle.
3	"Episode 3"	Ciarán Donnelly	Alan Whiting	19 January 2004
4	"Episode 4"	Ciarán Donnelly	Eric Deacon	26 January 2004

=== Series 2: Prescription for Murder (2005) ===
No. overall	No. in series	Title	Directed by	Written by	Original release date
5	1	"Episode 1"	Thaddeus O'Sullivan	Tim Loane	4 April 2005
Terry investigates the deaths of two scientists, ex-workers of Irish pharmaceutical giants Chemacran. Maureen, now a journalist working for the same paper as Terry, is also chasing a scoop on the MD of Chemacran. Elsewhere, Cora is desperately trying to find a reason for the death of her partner Maurice which she firmly believes wasn’t suicide, but murder.
6	2	"Episode 2"	Thaddeus O'Sullivan	Tim Loane	11 April 2005
7	3	"Episode 3"	Thaddeus O'Sullivan	Tim Loane	18 April 2005
8	4	"Episode 4"	Thaddeus O'Sullivan	Tim Loane	25 April 2005
