= The Ghoul (2016 film) =

2016 horror film directed by Gareth Tunley

- Film poster
- Directed by: Gareth Tunley
- Written by: Gareth Tunley
- Produced by: Jack Healy Guttmann; Tom Meeten; Gareth Tunley
- Starring: Tom Meeten; Alice Lowe; Rufus Jones; Niamh Cusack; Geoffrey McGivern
- Cinematography: Benjamin Pritchard
- Edited by: Robin Hill
- Music by: Waen Shepherd
- Production company: Ghoul Film
- Distributed by: Arrow Films; Cartilage Films
- Release dates: 14 October 2016 (London Film Festival); 4 August 2017
- Running time: 85 minutes
- Country: United Kingdom
- Language: English
- Box office: $18,460

The Ghoul is a 2016 British psychological crime thriller film written, directed and co-produced by Gareth Tunley and starring Tom Meeten. The film was released on 14 October 2016 at the London Film Festival and received good reviews from critics.

== Plot ==
A detective decides to go undercover to investigate a psychotherapist who, he thinks, is responsible for a murder.

== Cast ==
- Tom Meeten as Chris
- Alice Lowe as Kathleen
- Rufus Jones as Coulson
- Niamh Cusack as Fisher
- Geoffrey McGivern as Morland
- Paul Kaye as Tommy Parnell
- James E. Kenward as Drez
- Dan Renton Skinner as Jim
- Waen Shepherd as Gav

== Reception ==
=== Critical response ===
On review aggregator Rotten Tomatoes, The Ghoul has an approval rating of 77% based on 22 reviews, with an average rating of 6.4/10. Stephen Dalton from The Hollywood Reporter gave it a good review, writing: "A British micro-budget nerve-jangler that keeps viewers guessing to the final frame, The Ghoul is a noir-flavored mood piece with grand ambitions beyond its minimal means". Peter Bradshaw writing for The Guardian gave the film 2 out of 5 stars, stating: "Initially interesting but heartsinkingly pointless, this brooding Brit indie takes us on a journey to nowhere". Catherine Bray from the Variety liked the film and said: "The Ghoul isn't the midnight horror romp its title may suggest and as such might disappoint a crowd with an appetite for shock and gore — it needs to be positioned subtly by distributors and festival programmers who may wish to lean more heavily on the apt Lynch comparisons from early reactions. Its twisty-turny psychological gymnastics should satisfy fans of oblique, Lost Highway-style material more than full-on horror-heads".

=== Accolades ===
The Ghoul was nominated for the 71st British Academy Film Awards in the category of Outstanding Debut by a British Writer, Director or Producer. However, it lost to I Am Not a Witch. The film was also nominated for a "Discovery Award" at the 2016 British Independent Film Awards, but lost to The Greasy Strangler.
