= Pomáz =

- Town
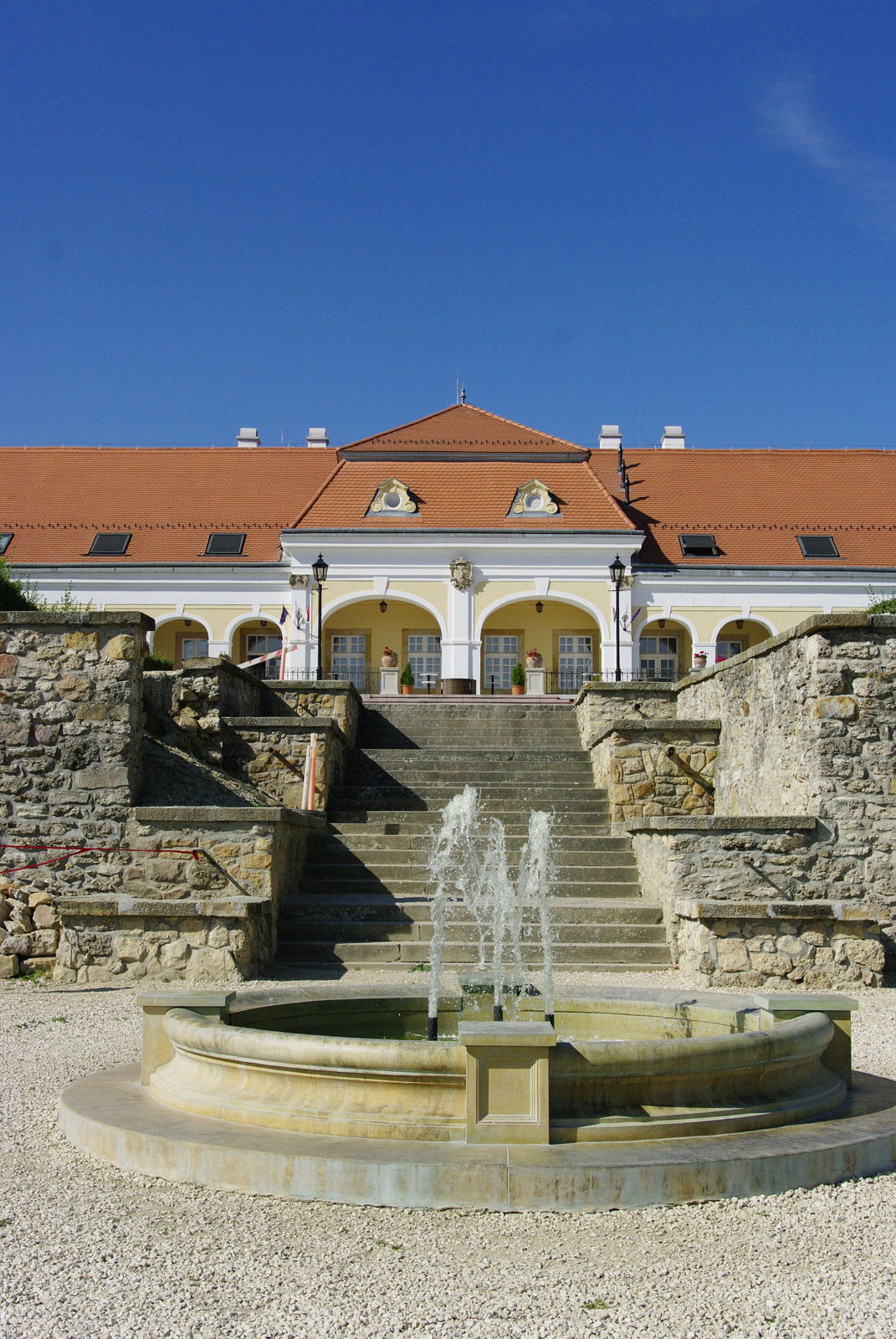
- Teleki palace

- Flag Coat of arms

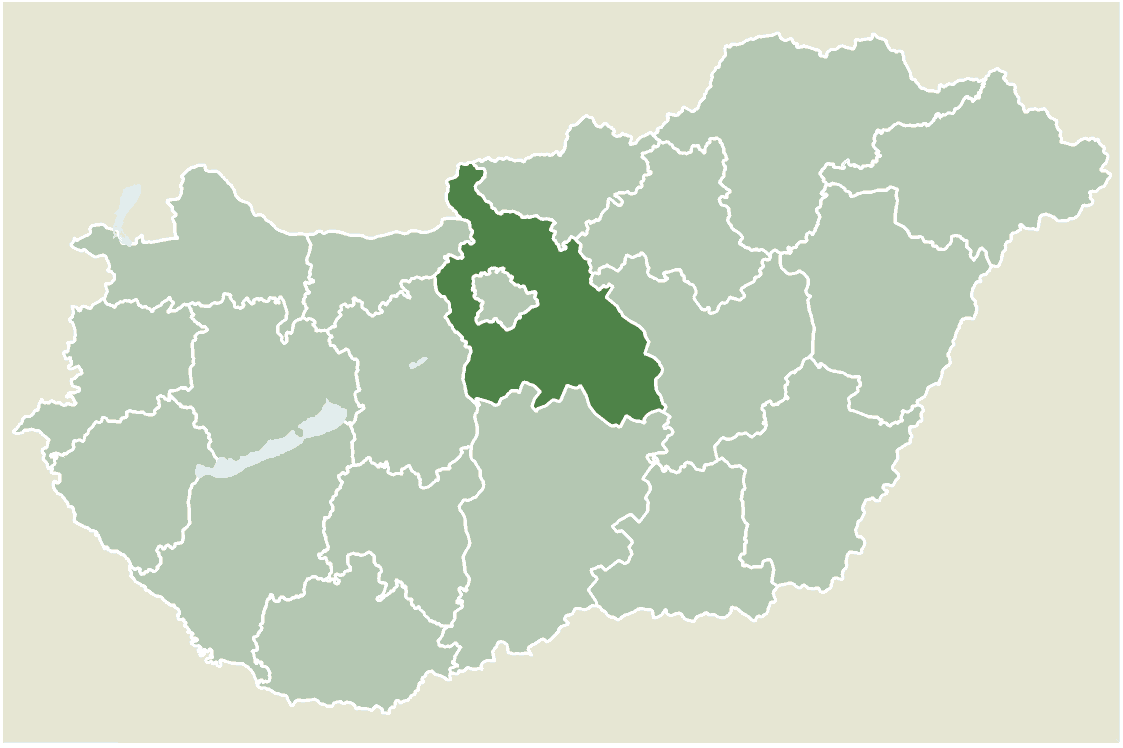
- Location of Pest county in Hungary

- Location of Pomáz
- Coordinates: 47.64305°N 19.01957°E
- Country: Hungary
- County: Pest

Area
  - Total: 49.04 km^{2} (18.93 sq mi)

Population (2024)
  - Total: 18,410
  - Density: 34,191/km^{2} (88,550/sq mi)
- Time zone: UTC+1 (CET)
  - Summer (DST): UTC+2 (CEST)
- Postal code: 2013
- Area code: 26

Pomáz (German: Paumasch) is a small town in Pest County, Hungary. It is located on the HÉV commuter train line from Budapest to Szentendre.

== Sights ==
Pomáz is famous for its Serbian Orthodox Church of St. George. Just as in nearby Szentendre, a Serbian community existed in the town since the time of the Ottoman presence in Eastern Europe. There are also a Roman Catholic and a Calvinist church in the town.

The town also features the Teleki-Wattay castle, built in 1773 in baroque style, but extensively renovated in the second half of the 19th century. After the Second World War, it was converted to an orphanage, and successively a child-care institute; in the early 21st century it was renovated once again under the EU Phare programme, and became a venue for choir projects, known as the Choral Castle.

== Notable people ==
The Teleki family, which owned the castle, counted among its members controversial prime minister Pál Teleki (in office 1920-1921 and 1939–1941).

- Max Kopfstein, (1856–1924), Rabbi, expert in the negotiations to the Treaty of Versailles, 1919
- Andreas Alföldi (1895–1981), historian
- Sándor Egervári (b. 1950), football manager
- Gyula Glykais (1893–1948), fencer
- Ádám György (b. 1982), pianist

== Twin towns – sister cities ==
Pomáz is twinned with:

- Krzywiń, Poland
- Oberhausen-Rheinhausen, Germany
