= The Painter (play) =

Play by Rebecca Lenkiewicz

- Original language: English
- Written by: Rebecca Lenkiewicz
- Characters: J. M. W. Turner (painter); Jenny Cole (Turner's model); Mary Marshall (Turner's mother); Sarah Danby (Turner's mistress)
- Subject: Joseph Mallord William Turner

Premiere
- Date: January 2011
- Place: Arcola Theatre (London)

The Painter is a 2011 play by the British writer Rebecca Lenkiewicz on the life and relationships of J. M. W. Turner. It premiered at the Arcola Theatre in London in January 2011 to mark its move to new premises. The premiere cast included Toby Jones as Turner, Denise Gough as Turner's model Jenny Cole, Amanda Boxer as Turner's mother and Niamh Cusack as his mistress Sarah Danby.
