= Too Good to Be True (2003 TV series) =

British mystery thriller television series

- Genre: Thriller
- Written by: William Humble
- Directed by: Sarah Harding
- Starring: Peter Davison; Niamh Cusack; Adrian Lukis; Sandra Huggett; Caroline Loncq; Joseph Friend; Heather Louise Cameron; Sadie Shimmin; Jax Williams; Patrick Pearson
- Composer: Jennie Muskett
- Country of origin: United Kingdom
- Original language: English
- No. of series: 1
- No. of episodes: 2

Production
- Executive producer: Charles Elton
- Producer: Lars MacFarlane
- Cinematography: David Higgs
- Editor: David Rees
- Running time: 75 minutes
- Production company: Carlton Television

Original release
- Network: ITV
- Release: 22 September – 23 September 2003

Too Good to Be True is a two-part British television drama thriller miniseries, written by William Humble and directed by Sarah Harding, that first broadcast on ITV between 22 and 23 September 2003. The series stars Peter Davison and Niamh Cusack as Robert and Tina Lewis, a happily divorced couple with a modern relationship and two children, who live with their mother. Robert is remarried to a younger career woman, but reacts very badly when, after four years of being single, Tina begins a new relationship with Matthew (Adrian Lukis). And when his attempts to sabotage his ex-wife’s new relationship fail, his jealousy escalates out of control and his obsession turns her new life into a growing nightmare that threatens to destroy his own marriage, his children and everything he holds dear.

The first episode of Too Good to Be True attracted 7.28 million viewers, while the concluding episode attracted 6.55. The series was released on DVD via ITV Studios on 21 May 2007.

== Production ==
The series was filmed in and around the United Kingdom.

== Reception ==
Memorable TV described the series as "a thriller based on jealousy and sexual obsession". Betsy Reed of The Guardian described the main characters as unsympathetic, but called the show "a tightly written, well-acted drama that avoided the usual pitfalls."

== Cast ==
- Peter Davison as Robert Lewis
- Niamh Cusack as Tina Lewis
- Adrian Lukis as Matthew Jarman
- Sandra Huggett as Carol Lewis
- Caroline Loncq as Stella
- Joseph Friend as Charlie Lewis
- Heather Louise Cameron as Amy Lewis
- Sadie Shimmin as Debbie
- Jax Williams as Pauline
- Patrick Pearson as Anthony
