= Ádám György =

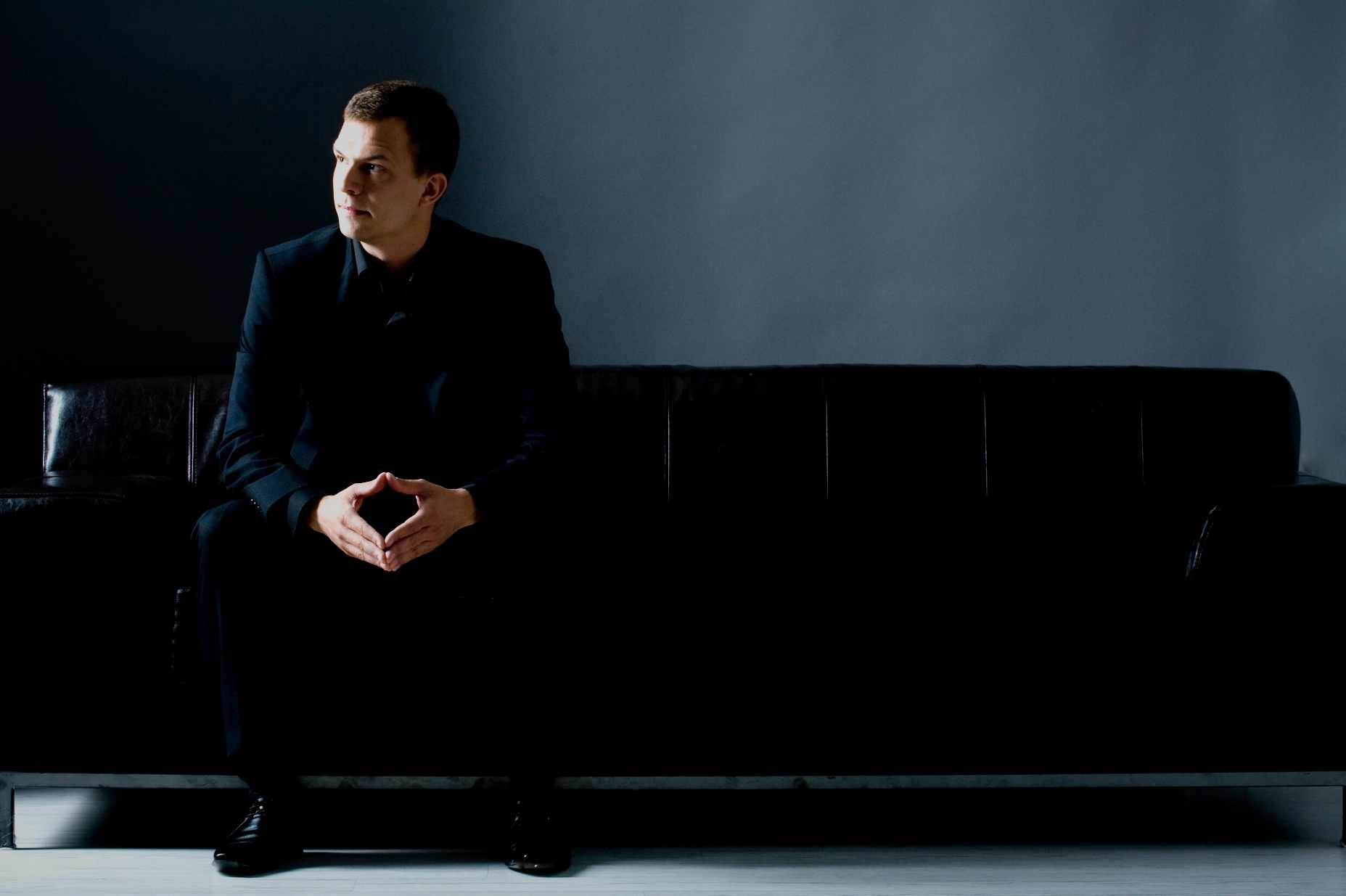
- Ádám György, 2011

Background information
- Born: 28 January 1982 (age 44); Budapest, Hungary
- Origin: Pomáz, Hungary
- Genres: Classical
- Occupation: Pianist
- Instrument: Piano
- Website: adamgyorgy.com

Ádám György ([ˈɟørɟ ˈaːdaːm]; born 28 January 1982) is a Hungarian pianist. György started his music studies at the age of four. While studying under Katalin Halmagyi, he was accepted to the Béla Bartók Conservatory in Budapest in 1994. György won the National Youth Piano Competition in 1998 and the Hungary's Pianist 2000 award two years later. From 2000 to 2006, Ádám attended the Franz Liszt Academy of Music in Budapest, where he studied under György Nador and Balázs Reti. Currently, he is pursuing graduate studies at the Franz Liszt Academy, and he is director of the Adam György Castle Academy. On 8 June 2012, he performed at the opening ceremony of the UEFA Euro 2012 in Warsaw, Poland. On 10 June 2023, György performed the piano version of the UEFA Champions League Anthem prior to the final in Istanbul. Three years later from his performance in Istanbul, he returned to perform the anthem in the final which was in his hometown

== Awards ==
- 2004 – First International Chopin Piano Competition in Budapest: First Prize, Grand Prize and Special Prize
- 2003 – San Remo International Piano Competition: "Special Prize"
- 2002 – The Prix Classic Vienna (Wiener-Klassik-Preis)
- 2000 – Pianist Award 2000, for the Pianist of Year in 2000 in Hungary /Bela Bartok Conservatory/
- 1998 – 1st prize at National Youth Piano Competition, Hungary

== Recordings ==
- Ádám György, Concert in Budapest (2005)
- Ádám György, Plays the Piano (2006)
- Ádám György, Plays Bach and Mozart (2008)
- Ádám György, Live in Budapest (DVD HD) (2008)
- Ádám György, Live in Budapest, BLU-RAY (2009)
- Adam Gyorgy, The Carnegie Hall Concert CD (2016)
