= Zadok the Priest =

British coronation anthem

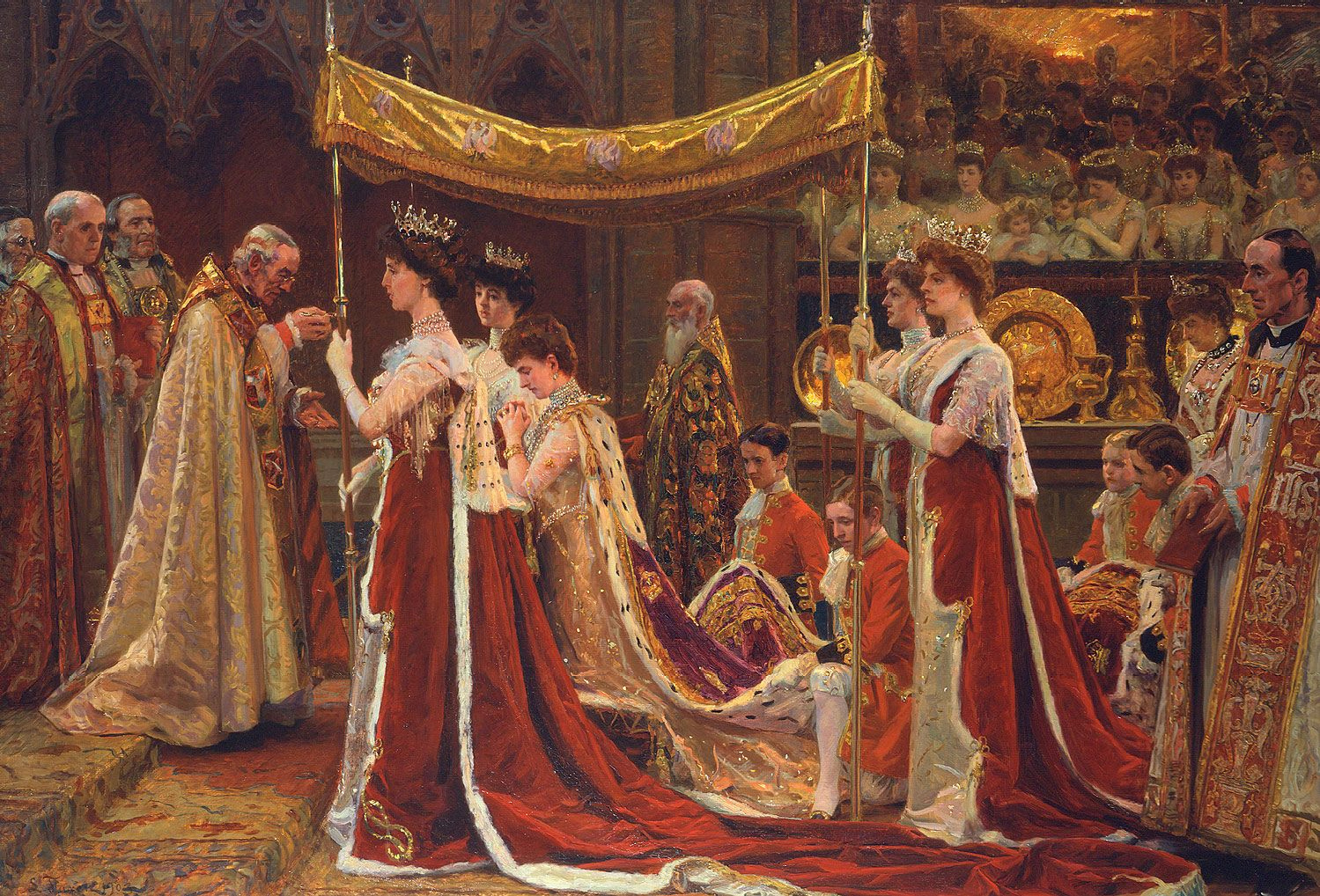
The anointing of Queen Alexandra at the coronation of Edward VII, 1902

Zadok the Priest (HWV 258) is an anthem composed by George Frideric Handel for the coronation of George II of Great Britain in 1727. Alongside The King Shall Rejoice, My Heart is Inditing, and Let Thy Hand Be Strengthened, Zadok the Priest is one of Handel's coronation anthems. One of Handel's best-known works, it has been sung prior to the anointing at the coronation of every British monarch since its composition.

== Text ==
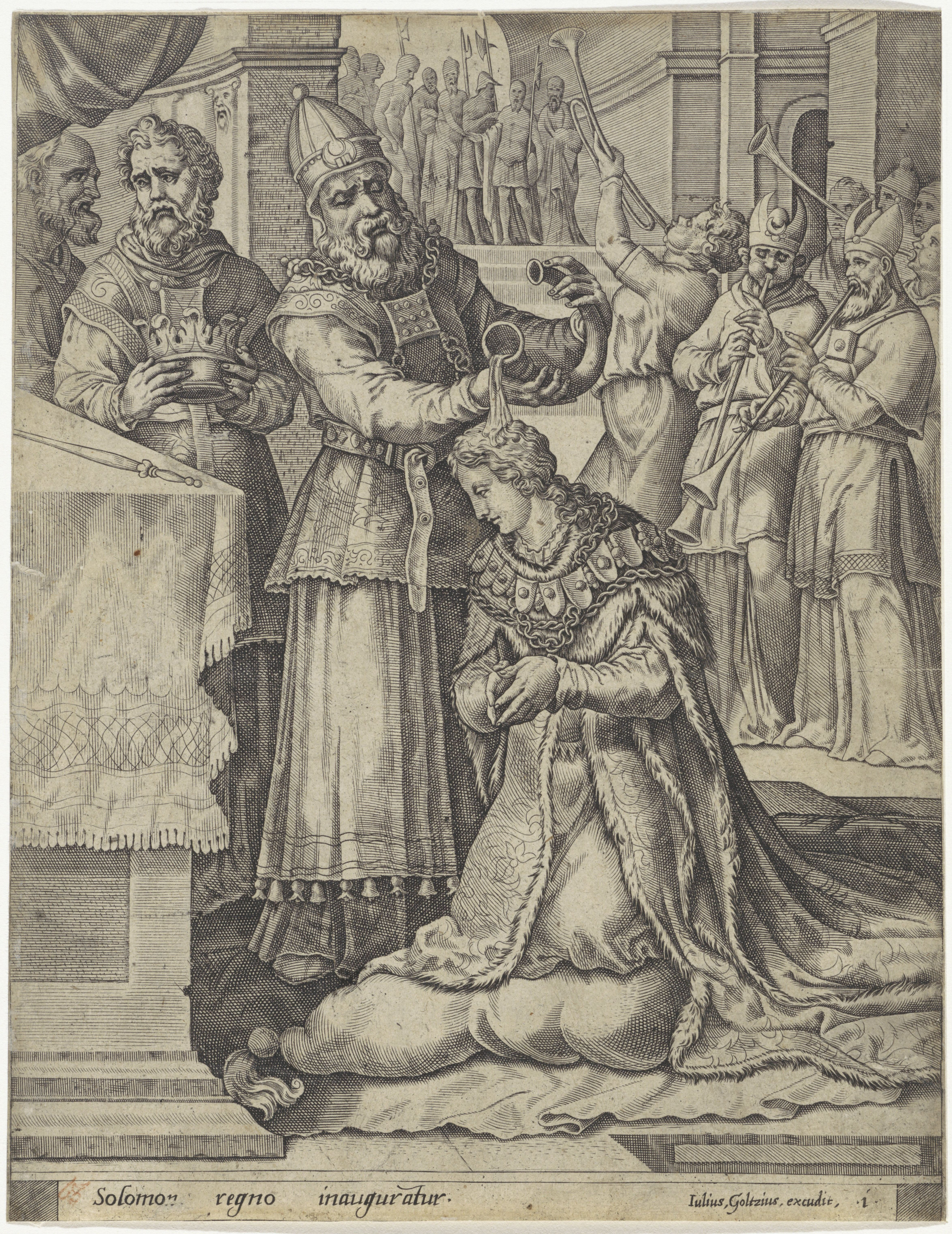
Zadok anointing Solomon, depicted in a 16th-century engraving

The text of Zadok the Priest is a translation of the traditional antiphon Unxerunt Salomonem, itself derived from the biblical account of the anointing of Solomon by the priest Zadok. This antiphon has formed part of the English coronation service since at least the 10th century, having been sung at the coronation of King Edgar at Bath Abbey in 973. Thomas Tomkins is thought to have composed a version of it for the coronation of Charles I in 1626, the text of which has survived but not the music. Henry Lawes wrote another for the coronation of Charles II in 1661. This was also sung at James II's coronation in 1685, although the music may have been amended to accommodate changes to the text made by Archbishop William Sancroft.

At the coronation of George II on 11 October 1727, the choir of Westminster Abbey sang Zadok the Priest in the wrong part of the service; they had earlier entirely forgotten to sing one anthem, and another ended "in confusion".

=== Lyrics ===
The lyrics of the piece are biblical, being a distillation of 1 Kings 1:34-45:

Zadok the priest and Nathan the prophet anointed Solomon king.
And all the people rejoiced and said:
God save the King! Long live the King! God save the King!
May the King live for ever. Amen. Hallelujah.

== Structure ==
Zadok the Priest
Performed by St Matthew's Choir, 2013; Damien Giromella, director

Zadok the Priest is written for a chorus and orchestra consisting of two oboes, two bassoons, three trumpets, timpani, strings with three violin parts rather than the usual two, and continuo (SS-AA-T-BB scoring), in the key of D major. The music prepares a surprise in its orchestral introduction through the use of static layering of soft string textures followed by a sudden rousing forte tutti entrance, augmented by three trumpets.

The middle section, "And all the people rejoic'd, and said", is a dance form in 3/4 time, with the choir singing chordally and a dotted rhythm in the strings.

The final section, "God save the King", etc., is a return to common time (4/4), with the "God save the King" section heard chordally, interspersed with the Amens incorporating long semiquaver runs, taken in turn through the six voice parts (SAATBB) with the other parts singing quaver chords accompanying it. The chorus ends with a largo plagal cadence on "Alleluia".

== In other contexts ==
Tony Britten rearranged Zadok the Priest in 1992, using it as the basis for the "UEFA Champions League Anthem".

The song was played during the wedding processional of Crown Prince Frederik of Denmark and Mary Donaldson. Their wedding took place on 14 May 2004 at Copenhagen Cathedral.

=== Geopolitical context ===
When considering the biblical comparisons to the modern British monarchy this coronation anthem becomes a symbol of continuity of the British monarchy for nearly 300 years. In The Bible Decoded, author Philippe Bohström claims that, "The... Solomonic kingship extends beyond biblical narratives, influencing national identities and monarchies." He goes on to explain that the use of this anthem symbolizes the continuity and divine sanction that the British monarchy claims and has done for nearly one thousand years.

== See also ==
- Handel's coronation anthems
