= Coronation anthem =

Choral music to accompany the coronation of a monarch

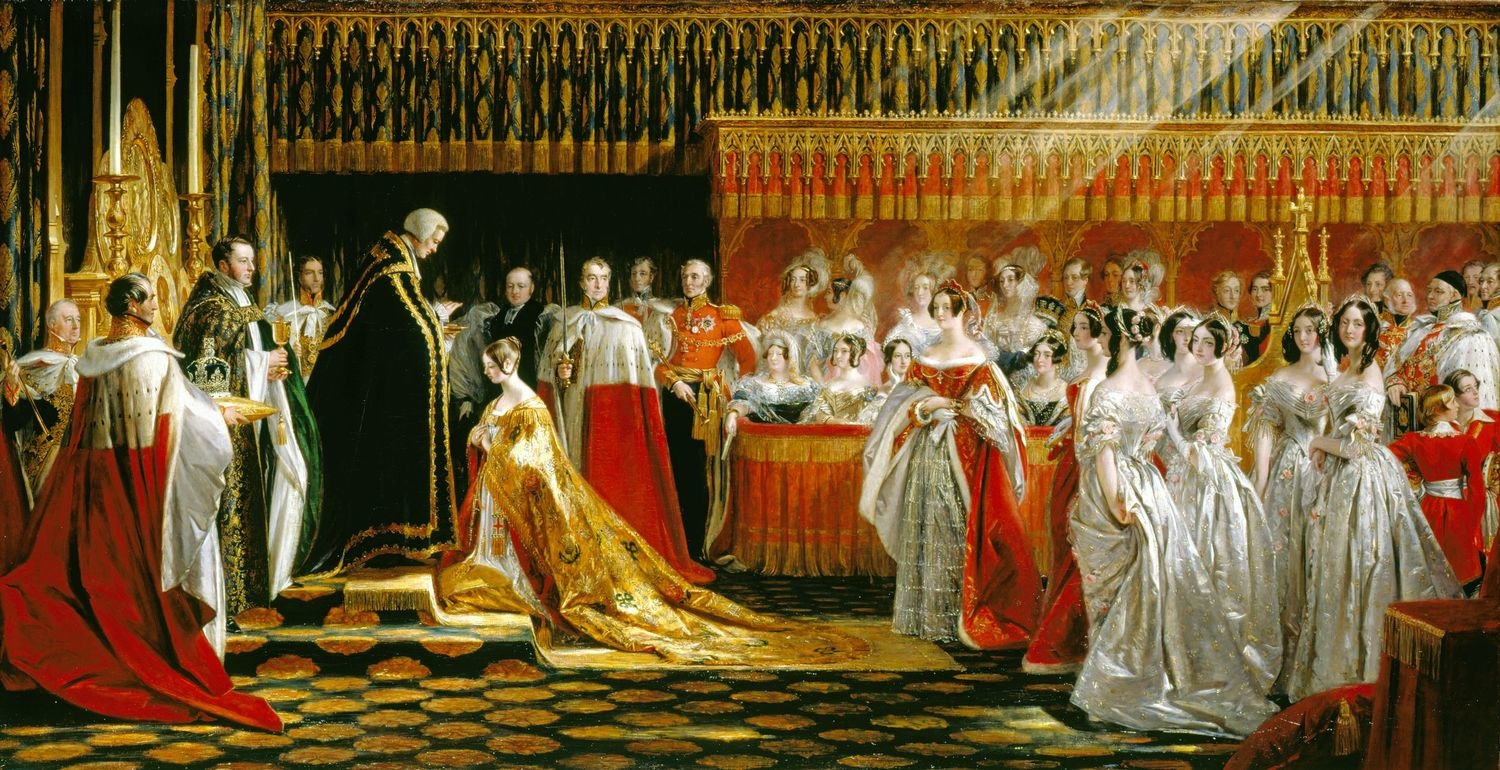
Queen Victoria receiving the sacrament at her coronation on 28 June 1838

A coronation anthem is a piece of choral music to accompany the crowning of a monarch. Many composers have written such works. Being anthems, they are not hymns but textured motets requiring a trained choir.

Four familiar coronation anthems are those by George Frideric Handel composed in 1727 for the crowning of George II of Great Britain. They use texts from the King James Bible. In the sequence for the service, they are:

- Let Thy Hand Be Strengthened — for the recognition of the king as the rightful ruler
- Zadok the Priest — for the anointing, i.e. recognition by God and the Church
- The King Shall Rejoice — for the crowning itself
- My Heart is Inditing — for the anointing and coronation of the queen

== Handel's coronation anthems ==
Although part of the traditional content of British coronations, the texts for all four anthems were picked by Handel—a personal selection from the most accessible account of an earlier coronation, that of James II of England in 1685. One of George I of Great Britain's last acts before his death in 1727 was to sign an "Act of naturalisation of George Frideric Händel and others". Handel's first commission as a newly naturalised British subject was to write the music for the coronation of George II of Great Britain and Queen Caroline which took place on 11 October the same year. Within the coronation ceremonies Let thy hand be strengthened was played first, then Zadok, then The King shall rejoice, and finally My heart is inditing at the coronation of the Queen. (In modern coronations the order is Zadok, Let thy hand be strengthened, The King shall rejoice and My heart is inditing, with the order of Let thy hand be strengthened and The King shall rejoice sometimes reversed.)

Right from their composition the four anthems have been popular and regularly played in concerts and festivals even during Handel's own lifetime. He re-used substantial extracts from them in many of his oratorios without many changes (other than to the text), notably Esther and Deborah. Two of the anthems were played at the 1742 inauguration of the Holywell Music Room in Oxford, a hall dedicated to chamber music. Their success perhaps contributed to the popular image of Handel as a composer whose music required a huge number of singers and musicians (the more the better)—in other words, the character criticised by Berlioz as "a barrel of pork and beer". In practice, Handel often adapted his music to the occasion and to the skill of those for whom he was writing, and no occasion could be grander than a coronation. The ceremonial style of the anthems differs from his music for the theatre just as his Music for the Royal Fireworks (the latter designed for open-air performance) differs from his instrumental concertos. The anthems show a completely extrovert tone, managing massed forces and important contrasts rather than delicate colours—with the wide spatial reverberation in Westminster Abbey, he did not waste time and effort trying to show small points of detail.

The means he had at his disposal were the most important of the era—the choir of the Chapel Royal was augmented by 47 singers, with an orchestra which reached perhaps 160 people. The chorus was divided into 6 or 7 groups (with the tenors kept together) and a large string section, made up of three groups of violins (rather than the two which were usual).

=== Zadok the Priest ===
Zadok the Priest (HWV 258) is thought to have been composed between 9 September and 11 October 1727.

The text of Zadok the Priest is derived from the biblical account of the anointing of Solomon by Zadok and Nathan and the people's rejoicing at this event. These words have been used in every English coronation since that of King Edgar at Bath Abbey in 973, and Handel's setting has been used at every British coronation since 1727. It is traditionally performed during the sovereign's anointing and its text is after 1 Kings (1:38–40). Its duration is just over five minutes. It is written in D major for: two sopranos, two altos, tenor, two basses, choir, and orchestra (two oboes, two bassoons, three trumpets, timpani, strings, and continuo). The music prepares a surprise in its orchestral introduction via the use of static layering of soft string textures, followed by a sudden rousing forte tutti entrance, augmented by three trumpets.

The middle section "And all the people rejoic'd, and said" is an imitative dance in 3/4 time, mainly with the choir singing in a homophonic texture and a dotted rhythm in the strings.

The final section "God save the King, ..." is a return to common time (4/4), with the "God save the King" section in homophony, interspersed with the "Amens" incorporating long semiquaver runs which are taken in turn through the six voice parts (SAATBB) with the other parts singing quaver chords accompanying it. The chorus ends with a largo plagal cadence on "Allelujah".

=== Let Thy Hand Be Strengthened ===
Let Thy Hand Be Strengthened (HWV 259) is thought to have been composed between 9 September 1727 and 11 October 1727.

The text of the second hymn is from Psalm 89 (verses 13–14). It is divided into three parts: a cheerful light beginning in G major, a melancholy, slow middle section in E minor and a closing Alleluia part again in G major.

=== The King Shall Rejoice ===
The King Shall Rejoice (HWV 260) is thought to have been composed between 9 September 1727 and 11 October 1727.

Taking a text from Psalm 21 (verses 1–3, 5), Handel splits this work into separate sections. The first movement is in D major, on the king's joy in God's power. This is full of festive pomp and fanfares, with a long ritornello of the introduction, using the full force of the choir and orchestra. The second is in A major and gentler, using no trumpets and drums. It is played on a three-time cadence and uses the highest and lowest string sections in a playful conversation, resulting in a triplet. It then enjoys long chains of suspensions on the phrase "thy salvation". The third movement begins with a radiant D major chord by the chorus and is a brief outburst of triumphalism with an extraordinary harmonic surprise, telling of the king's coronation with a crown of pure gold and ending in a B minor fugue. This links it directly to the fourth movement, which is again in three-time but this time counterpointed with a fugue. Handel builds the passion by adding instruments one by one—first the strings, then the oboes and finally the trumpets and drums. The final movement is an exuberant D major double fugue (a fugue with two melodies simultaneously played against each other right from the start), ending in a closing 'Alleluia' that was to be played at the precise moment the king was crowned.

=== My Heart is Inditing ===
My Heart is Inditing (HWV 261) is thought to have been composed between 9 September 1727 and 11 October 1727.

This piece sets a text developed by Henry Purcell for the 1685 coronation, consisting of a shortened adaptation of verses from Psalm 45 (verses 1, 10, 12) and Book of Isaiah (chapter 49, verse 23). In 1727, it was sung at the end of the coronation of Queen Caroline, with adaptations by Handel to make its words more appropriate for a queen. The music is in four sections and characterised by a more refined and distinguished air than the other anthems.

The overture to its first movement is not a flamboyant trumpet fanfare but a three-time andante. The first section is in D major, begun by the soloists (originally 2 singers from each group to balance against the full breadth of the orchestra) before alternating between soloists and full choir. The second section is in A major and is also an elegant andante and sets up a charming bass line which is taken up by the orchestra, and the melody begins with a long note followed by a casual dotted rhythm pointing out the words "King's daughters". The third movement in E major is yet again an andante, keeping up the graceful and feminine air until the joyous dotted rhythm reappears on the words "and the King shall have pleasure". Handel then keeps up the allegro until the end and the orchestra begins the final movement in D major (after Isa. 49.23) with a virtuoso ritornello before the choirs enter with all the solemn ceremonial pomp of the other anthems. Handel kept the trumpets back in reserve throughout the piece right until the end, where they add another triumphal dimension to the finale.

== Coronation anthems by other composers ==
The genre of coronation anthems was not exclusive to Handel. Coronations included up to twelve anthems and used formulaic coronation texts —starting with the anthem for the procession at the beginning of the coronation ceremonies (usually "Oh Lord, grant the King a long life"). Other composers to have produced anthems used during the coronation service include:

- Thomas Tomkins who wrote anthems for the 1626 coronation of Charles I, including a setting of Zadok the Priest.
- Henry Lawes who wrote a setting of Zadok the Priest for the 1661 coronation of Charles II.
- John Blow, may have set I was glad (the sources are ambiguous whether this was by Blow or Purcell).
- Henry Purcell, who produced I was glad (unless it was by Blow) and My Heart is Inditing, among others.
- Francis Pigott, who wrote a setting of I was glad for the coronation of Queen Anne in 1702.
- William Croft, wrote The Lord is a Sun and a Shield for George I.
- William Boyce, commissioned by George III to write all the music for his coronation, but asked for (and was granted) permission to reuse Handel's setting of Zadok the Priest, as he felt it couldn't be improved upon.
- Thomas Attwood, who contributed I was glad for the coronation of George IV in 1821, Oh grant the King a long life for the coronation of William IV in 1830 and finally began a third anthem for Queen Victoria's coronation in 1838 but he died three months beforehand and it was never completed.
- William Knyvett wrote This is the Day that the Lord hath made for the 1838 coronation of Queen Victoria.
- Sir Hubert Parry, whose setting of I was glad was composed for the coronation of Edward VII in 1902.
- Sir Frederick Bridge, who wrote Kings shall see and arise for the 1902 coronation.
- Sir Edward Elgar, who wrote O Hearken Thou for the 1911 coronation of George V.
- Sir Henry Walford Davies, who wrote Confortare (Be strong and play the Man) for the 1937 coronation of George VI.
- Ralph Vaughan Williams, who composed a Festal Te Deum for the coronation of George VI and the brief meditative O taste and see for the coronation of Elizabeth II in 1953.
- Herbert Howells, who wrote Behold, O God our Defender for the 1953 coronation.
- Sir William Walton, who wrote a Coronation Te Deum for the 1953 coronation.
- Healey Willan, who wrote O Lord our Governour for the 1953 coronation.
- Andrew Lloyd Webber, who wrote Make a Joyful Noise for the coronation of Charles III in 2023.

== See also ==
- Anthems by George Frideric Handel
- Coronation Mass (Mozart)
- Koningslied
