= Tony Britten =

British musical director, composer and film maker

Tony Britten is a British musical director, composer and film maker, also known for adapting the music and writing the text of the UEFA Champions League Anthem.

== Education and early career ==
Britten was educated at Trinity School, Croydon where he sang in the Trinity Boys Choir, and took operatic roles in professional productions as a treble. Among these were Yniold in Pelléas et Mélisande conducted by Pierre Boulez at the Royal Opera House in 1969.

When his voice broke he began to compose, winning a bursary from the Society for the Promotion of New Music to study electronic music with George Newson at Goldsmiths’ College. He went on to study singing, piano and conducting at the Royal College of Music, where his teachers included Norman Del Mar, Joseph Horovitz and David Willcocks.

== Musicals and opera ==
Britten spent the first few years of his career in theatre as a musical director, including working for Cameron Mackintosh as music supervisor on many shows including Godspell, The Rocky Horror Show and Oliver!. After that he worked at the National Theatre, where he was orchestrator and musical director of the National's Guys and Dolls production in 1982, directed by Richard Eyre.

In the 1990s Britten and his Music Theatre London company put on a series of adaptations of the Mozart/Da Ponte operas at the Drill Hall in London. The librettos were translated into modern English with spoken dialogue replacing the recitatives, the music was re-scored for small ensemble, and actors were used in preference to opera singers. He did much the same thing with Puccini's La bohème and Verdi's Falstaff, making film versions of those production in 2000 and 2005 respectively.

== Film work ==
Britten has also directed a number of other films and composed film scores. In 1994, he composed the music for the Christmas animated special Mole's Christmas. Some Little Joy (2005) told the life story of mavarick composer Peter Warlock. In 2007 Britten adapted and directed a film version of Oliver Goldsmith’s comedy She Stoops to Conquer for Sky Arts. In 2013 he made a documentary about his unrelated namesake, Benjamin Britten. In 2018 he released Through Lotte's Lens: The Story Of The Hitler Emigres. John Craxton - A Life Of Gifts, a documentary exploring the life and work of artist John Craxton, was released in 2022.

== Music for sport ==
In 1992, UEFA commissioned Britten to arrange an anthem for the UEFA Champions League which commenced in November 1992. Britten borrowed heavily from George Frideric Handel's Zadok the Priest (one of his Coronation Anthems), and the piece was performed by London's Royal Philharmonic Orchestra and sung by the Academy of St. Martin in the Fields. He returned to composing for sports events in 2007, writing the official anthem of Mustafa V. Koç Sports Award.
