= Maureen Cusack =

Irish actress (1920–1977)

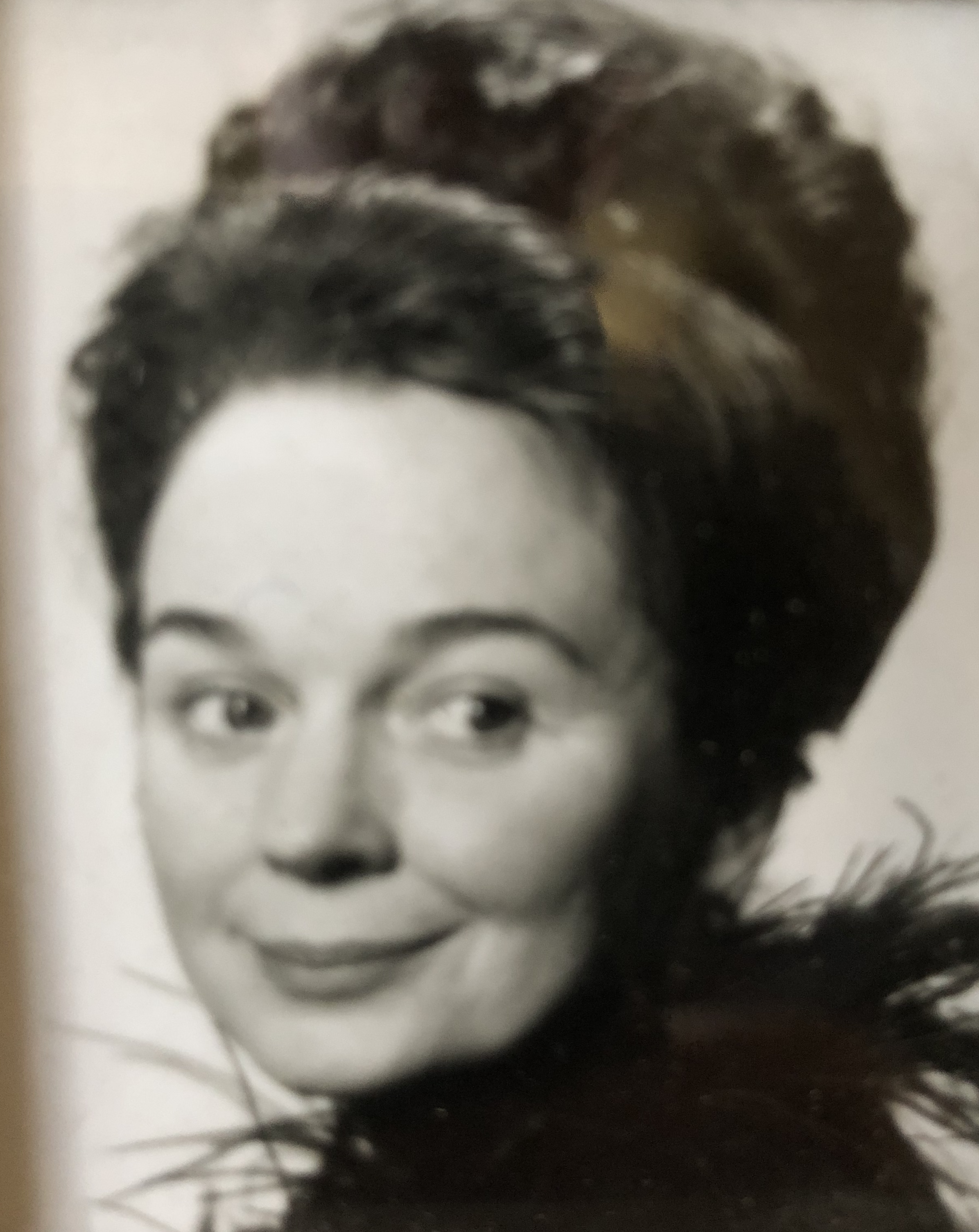
- Cusack in 1966
- Born: Mary Margaret Kiely; 24 November 1920; Glenties, County Donegal, Ireland
- Died: 18 December 1977 (aged 57); Dublin, Ireland
- Resting place: St. Fintan's Cemetery, Sutton
- Occupation: Actress
- Years active: 1945–1975
- Spouse: Cyril Cusack (m. 1945)
- Children: 5, including Sinéad, Sorcha, Niamh, and Pádraig Cusack
- Relatives: Richard Boyd Barrett (grandson); Max Irons (grandson); Calam Lynch (grandson); Megan Cusack (granddaughter); Jeremy Irons (son-in-law); Finbar Lynch (son-in-law)

Maureen Cusack (24 November 1920 – 18 December 1977) was an Irish actress. She was born in 1920 in Glenties, County Donegal, Ireland as Mary Margaret Kiely. She was married to Irish actor Cyril Cusack and they had five children Sinéad, Sorcha, Niamh, Paul and Pádraig. Sinéad, Sorcha and Niamh are all actresses and Pádraig is a theatre producer. Her grandsons are actors Max Irons and Calam Lynch, and the politician Richard Boyd Barrett. Her granddaughters include actresses Beth Cooke and Megan Cusack.

She was a leading actress at Dublin's Gate Theatre with transfers to London's West End in the late 1940s, she also was part of the Abbey Theatre Dublin in 1948 as a visiting company member with The Lyric Theatre Company where she appeared in The Viscount of Blarney in1948. In 1946, she appeared in a Radio Éireann production of a play by Irish playwright Teresa Deevy called Katie Roche and again in 1947 in Wife to James Whelan, these were both produced by Gabriel Fallon.

She is best known for her roles in Odd Man Out (1947), The Rising of the Moon (1957), Von Richthofen and Brown (1971), also The Loves of Cass Maguire (1975), and Playboy of the Western World (1946).

She died on 18 December 1977, in Dublin and is buried in Saint Fintan's Cemetery, Sutton, County Dublin, Ireland.

== Filmography ==
Year	Title	Role	Notes
1946	Playboy of the Western World	Susan Brady	TV movie
1947	Odd Man Out	Molly	with Cyril Cusack (as Pat)
1957	The Rising of the Moon	Sister Therese – 3rd episode	with Cyril Cusack (as Inspector Michael Dillon – 1st episode)
1968	Cradle Song	Mistress	TV movie – with Sorcha Cusack (as Sagrario)
1971	Von Richthofen and Brown (The Red Baron)	Richthofen's mother	—
1975	The Loves of Cass Maguire	Alice Maguire	TV Movie – (final film role)

== Theatrical work ==
- The Barrel Organ (1942) – Robert Collis
- Assembly at Druim Ceat (1943) – Roibeárd Ó Faracháin
- The Kiss (1944) – Austin Clarke
- The Viscount of Blarney (1944) – Austin Clarke
- Katie Roche (1946) – Teresa Deevy
- The Second Kiss (1946) - Austin Clarke
- Ill Met by Moonlight (1946) - Micheál MacLiammóir, followed by transfer to London's West End (1947)
- Wife to James Whelan (1947) – Teresa Deevy
- Home for Christmas (1950) - Micheál MacLiammóir
- Arms and the Man (1951) - George Bernard Shaw
- A Slipper for the Moon (1954) - Micheál MacLiammóir
- The Playboy of the Western World (1955) - John Millington Synge
- The Bishop's Bonfire (1955) - Seán O'Casey
- Androcles and the Lion (1956) - George Bernard Shaw
- The Rising of the Moon (1956) - Lady Gregory
- Roger Casement (1958) - Roger McHugh
- The Temptation of Mr O (1961) - Franz Kafka adapted for the stage by Cyril Cusack
