= Cyril Cusack =

Irish actor (1910–1993)

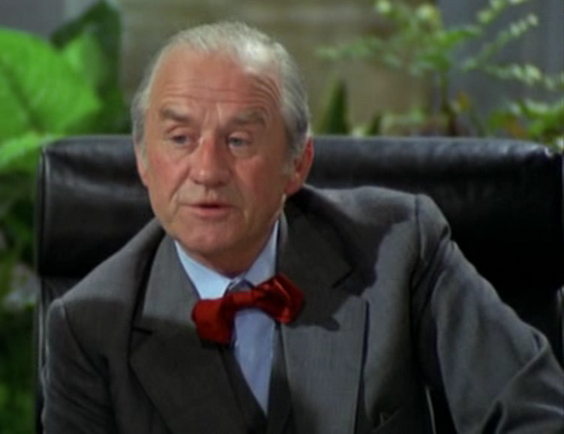
- Cusack in The Italian Connection (1972)
- Born: Cyril James Cusack; 26 November 1910; Durban, Natal, Union of South Africa (now in KwaZulu-Natal, South Africa)
- Died: 7 October 1993 (aged 82); London, England
- Occupation: Actor
- Years active: 1918–1993
- Spouses: Mary Margaret "Maureen" Kiely (m. 1945; died 1977) Mary Rose Cunningham (m. 1979)
- Children: 6, including Sinéad, Sorcha, Niamh, Pádraig and Catherine
- Relatives: Richard Boyd Barrett (grandson); Max Irons (grandson); Calam Lynch (grandson); Jeremy Irons (son-in-law); Finbar Lynch (son-in-law)

Cyril James Cusack (26 November 1910 – 7 October 1993) was an Irish stage and screen actor with a career that spanned more than 70 years. During his lifetime, he was considered one of Ireland's finest thespians, and was renowned for his interpretations of both classical and contemporary theatre, including Shakespearean roles as a member of the Royal Shakespeare Company, and over 60 productions for the Abbey Theatre, of which he was a lifelong member. In 2020, Cusack was ranked at number 14 on The Irish Times' list of Ireland's greatest film actors.

Born to Irish and English parents in South Africa and raised in County Tipperary, Cusack dropped out of law school to join the Abbey Theatre and remained with the company for 13 years, acting in over 60 plays. In London, he performed with the Royal Shakespeare Company and the Royal National Theatre, and later founded his own company which toured across Europe. Making his film debut at age 8, Cusack worked with many notable directors, including Powell and Pressburger, Franco Zeffirelli, François Truffaut, Carol Reed, Peter Brook, Peter Hall, Fred Zinnemann, Christine Edzard and Anthony Harvey. He co-starred opposite Richard Burton several times, who once commended Cusack's acting as "always himself and yet always totally different". Fluent in both English and Irish, Cusack had a starring role in the first Irish-language feature film, Poitín (1978).

He was the patriarch of the Irish Cusack acting family, as the father of Sinéad Cusack, Sorcha Cusack, Niamh Cusack, Pádraig Cusack, and Catherine Cusack.

== Early life and education ==
Cusack was born in Durban, Natal, South Africa. His mother, Alice Violet (née Cole), was an English Cockney actress and chorus girl, and his father, James Walter Cusack, was an Irish mounted policeman in Natal Colony, South Africa. His parents separated when he was young and his mother took him to England, and then to Ireland. Cusack's mother and her partner, Brefni O'Rorke, joined the O'Brien and Ireland Players.

Cyril made his first stage performance at the age of seven. He was educated at Newbridge College in Newbridge, County Kildare, then studied law at University College Dublin. He left without a degree and joined the Abbey Theatre in 1932.

== Career ==
=== Stage ===
Between then and 1945, he performed in over 60 productions for the Abbey, particularly excelling in the plays of Seán O'Casey. He also performed in plays by Irish playwright Teresa Deevy Katie Roche and The King of Spain's Daughter. In 1932 he also joined the Gate Theatre company, appearing with them in many notable productions over the years. In 1947, Cusack formed his own company, Cyril Cusack Productions, and staged productions in Dublin, Paris and New York.

In 1963, Cusack joined the Royal Shakespeare Company in London and appeared there for several seasons. By this stage he had established a successful career in films, which had started at the age of eight. The same year, Cusack won a Jacob's Award for his performance in the Telefís Éireann production of Triptych.

Cusack's favorite roles included The Covery in The Plough and the Stars and Christy Mahon in The Playboy of the Western World, which he reprised numerous times.

Cusack's last stage performance was in Chekhov's Three Sisters (1990), in which three of his daughters played the sisters.

=== Film and television ===
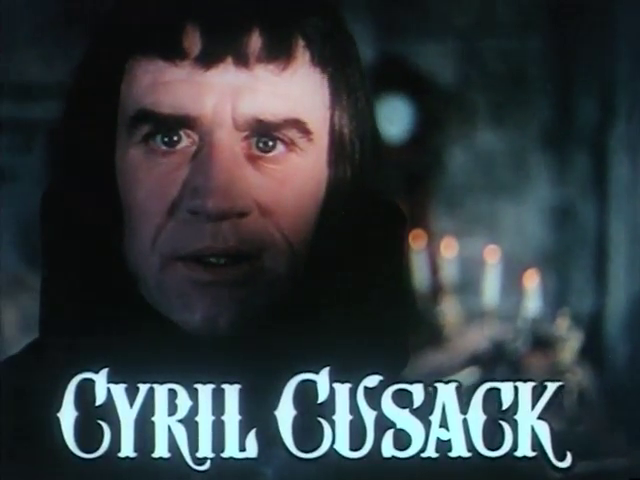
Cusack in the trailer for The Elusive Pimpernel (1950).

Cusack made his film debut in Knocknagow (1918), when he was only 8. His breakthrough role was as a wiry IRA getaway driver opposite James Mason in Carol Reed's Odd Man Out (1947). Later film roles included a sinister servant in The Spanish Gardener and the gunsmith in the The Day of the Jackal. On television, he played Bob Assingham, who also functions as the narrator, in the BBC adaptation of The Golden Bowl.

Cusack played the titular role in the Galileo (1968), which was the directorial debut of Italian filmmaker Liliana Cavani. Cusack returned to Italy several times throughout his career, particularly in the 1970s, both acting on-camera and working as a voice artist, helping create English-language dubs of Italian films.

Cusack, who was bilingual in English and Irish, had a leading part in the controversial Irish language film Poitín (1977).

One of his final appearances came in 1989, when he appeared as the elderly Dr Spencer in Danny, the Champion of the World alongside his son-in-law Jeremy Irons and his grandson Samuel.

=== Sound recordings ===
Among Cusack's audio recordings are the roles of Iago in Othello and Christy in The Playboy of the Western World, excerpts from A Portrait of the Artist as a Young Man and Finnegan's Wake, and poetry by Gerard Manley Hopkins and W.B. Yeats.

== Personal life ==
Cusack was twice married. His first wife was the actress Mary Margaret "Maureen" Kiely, whom he married on 5 April 1945. They had five children: Paul (born 1946) who worked as a producer with RTÉ, Sinéad (born 1948), Sorcha (born 1949), Niamh (born 1959) who all became actresses and Pádraig (born 1962) who worked as an associate producer at the National Theatre in London. Following Maureen's death in 1977, he married Mary Rose Cunningham in 1979, with whom he had previously had a daughter, Catherine (born 1968), who also became an actress.

Cusack was a strong supporter of Irish nationalism, and often selected projects based on those beliefs. In later life, Cusack became a campaigner for conservative causes in Ireland, notably in his opposition to abortion, and he became a frequent letter writer to the main liberal Irish newspaper, The Irish Times.

Regarding his Catholic faith, he commented "Religion promotes the divine discontent within oneself, so that one tries to make oneself a better person and draw oneself closer to God." His religious credentials came under scrutiny following his death and the revelation that he had been unfaithful in his first marriage, with a long-term mistress, Mary Rose Cunningham, who bore him a daughter. Cusack married Cunningham following his first wife's death.

Cusack received an honorary doctorate in 1977 from the NUI and in 1980, from the University of Dublin.

Cusack was a longtime friend of Irish attorney general, Chief Justice and President of Ireland Cearbhall Ó Dálaigh, whom he got to know when they were students at University College Dublin in the early 1930s.

Cusack is the maternal grandfather of Irish Socialist Workers Party TD Richard Boyd Barrett and English actor Max Irons.

== Death ==
In October 1993, Cusack died at home in Chiswick, Greater London, from MND. (Note: known in North America as Lou Gehrig's disease or amyotrophic lateral sclerosis)

== Filmography ==
=== Films ===
Year	Title	Role	Director(s)	Other notes
1918	Knocknagow	Brian's child	Fred O'Donovan	
1935	Guests of the Nation	IRA member	Denis Johnston	
1936	Servants All	Billy	Alex Bryce	Short film
1941	Inspector Hornleigh Goes To It	Postal Sorter	Walter Forde	
1941	Once a Crook	Bill Hopkins	Herbert Mason	
1947	Odd Man Out	Pat	Carol Reed	
1948	Escape	Rodgers	Joseph L. Mankiewicz	
1948	Esther Waters	Fred	Ian Dalrymple, Peter Proud	
1949	Once a Jolly Swagman	Duggie	Jack Lee	
1949	The Small Back Room	Corporal Taylor	Michael Powell, Emeric Pressburger	
1949	The Blue Lagoon	James Carter	Frank Launder	
1949	All Over the Town	Gerald Vane	Derek Twist	
1950	The Elusive Pimpernel	Citizen Chauvelin	Michael Powell, Emeric Pressburger	
1950	Gone to Earth	Edward Marston	Michael Powell, Emeric Pressburger	
1951	Soldiers Three	Private Dennis Malloy	Tay Garnett	
1951	The Secret of Convict Lake	Edward "Limey" Cockerell	Michael Gordon	
1951	The Blue Veil	Frank Hutchins	Curtis Bernhardt	
1953	Saadia	Khadir	Albert Lewin	
1954	The Last Moment	Daniel O'Driscoll	Lance Comfort	Segment: "The Sensible Man"
1954	Destination Milan	Paddy O'Clafferty	Lawrence Huntington	
1955	Passage Home	Bohannon	Roy Ward Baker	
1956	The Man Who Never Was	Cab Driver	Ronald Neame	
1956	The Man in the Road	Dr. Kelly	Lance Comfort	
1956	The March Hare	Lazy Mangan	George More O'Ferrall	
1956	Jacqueline	Mr. Flannagan	Roy Ward Baker	
1956	The Spanish Gardener	Garcia	Philip Leacock	
1957	Ill Met by Moonlight	Captain Sandy Rendel	Michael Powell, Emeric Pressburger	
1957	The Rising of the Moon	Inspector Michael Dillon	John Ford	Segment: "The Majesty of the Law"
1957	Miracle in Soho	Sam Bishop	Julian Amyes	
1958	Gideon's Day	Herbert "Birdie" Sparrow	John Ford	
1958	Floods of Fear	Peebles	Charles Crichton	
1959	Shake Hands with the Devil	Chris Noonan	Michael Anderson	
1960	A Terrible Beauty	Jimmy Hannafin	Tay Garnett	
1961	Johnny Nobody	Prosecuting Counsel O'Brien	Nigel Patrick	
1962	Waltz of the Toreadors	Dr. Grogan	John Guillermin	
1962	I Thank a Fool	Captain Ferris	Robert Stevens	
1963	80,000 Suspects	Father Maguire	Val Guest	
1965	The Spy Who Came in from the Cold	Control	Martin Ritt	
1966	Where the Spies Are	Rosser	Val Guest	
1966	I Was Happy Here	Hogan	Desmond Davis	
1966	Fahrenheit 451	Captain Beatty	François Truffaut	
1967	The Taming of the Shrew	Grumio	Franco Zeffirelli	
1968	Galileo	Galileo Galilei	Liliana Cavani	
1968	Oedipus the King	The Messenger	Philip Saville	
1970	Country Dance	Dr. Maitland	J. Lee Thompson	
1970	King Lear	Duke of Albany	Peter Brook	
1970	Tam Lin	Vicar Julian Ainsley	Roddy McDowall	
1971	Sacco & Vanzetti	Frederick Katzmann	Giuliano Montaldo	
1971	Harold and Maude	Glaucus	Hal Ashby	
1972	Execution Squad	Ernesto Stolfi	Steno	
1972	The Italian Connection	Corso	Fernando Di Leo	
1972	...All The Way, Boys!	Matto	Giuseppe Colizzi	
1973	The Bloody Hands of the Law	The Judge	Mario Gariazzo	
1973	The Day of the Jackal	The Gunsmith	Fred Zinnemann	
1973	The Homecoming	Sam	Peter Hall	Reprised role from 1965 West End production
1973	A Likely Story	Tom	William Kronick	
1974	Run, Run, Joe!	Parkintosh	Giuseppe Colizzi	
1974	The Balloon Vendor	The Balloon Vendor	Mario Gariazzo	
1974	Juggernaut	Major O'Neill	Richard Lester	Uncredited
1974	The Abdication	Chancellor Axel Oxenstierna	Anthony Harvey	
1975	Children of Rage	Mr. Shalom	Arthur Allan Seidelman	
1976	Fear in the City	Giacomo Masoni	Giuseppe Rosati	
1978	Poitín	Michil	Bob Quinn	
1981	Lovespell	Gormond of Ireland	Tom Donovan	
1981	True Confessions	Cardinal Danaher	Ulu Grosbard	
1982	The Outcasts	Myles Keenan	Robert Wynne-Simmons	
1983	The World of Don Camillo	The Bishop	Terence Hill	
1983	Wagner	Salomon Sulzer	Tony Palmer	
1984	Nineteen Eighty-Four	Charrington	Michael Radford	
1986	The Ballroom of Romance	Mr. Dwyer	Pat O'Connor	
1987	Little Dorrit	Frederick Dorrit	Christine Edzard	
1989	My Left Foot	Lord Castlewelland	Jim Sheridan	
1990	The Fool	The Ballad Seller	Christine Edzard	
1992	Far and Away	Danty Duff	Ron Howard	
1992	As You Like It	Adam	Christine Edzard	

=== Television ===
Year	Title	Role	Other notes
1953–56	Rheingold Theatre	Various	5 episodes
1959	DuPont Show of the Month	David Wylie	Episode: "What Every Woman Knows"
1959	The Moon and Sixpence	Dr. Coutras	Television film
1960	ITV Play of the Week	Doctor	Episode: "The Enchanted"
1960	Armchair Mystery Theatre	Stan Bracey	Episode: "The Dummy"
1961	The Power and the Glory	Tench	Television film
1962	The Chairs	The Old Man	Television film
1962	Somerset Maugham Hour	Wilson	Episode: "The Lotus Eater"
1962	ITV Play of the Week	The Devil	Episode: "Don Juan in Hell"
1962	T. E. Lawrence 1888–1935	Voice of T. E. Lawrence	broadcast 27 November, BBC
1963	Playhouse	Mr. Berry	Episode: "The Wedding Dress"
1963–64	Festival	Krapp / Thomas Becket / Father	3 episodes
1964	Drama 61-67	Harold Petley	Episode: "The Big Toe"
1965	Deirdre	Conchubar	Television film
1965–77	BBC Play of the Month	Mr. Fielding / Waiter	Episodes: "Passage to India" & "You Can Never Tell"
1967	Dial M for Murder	Chief Inspector Hubbard	Television film
1967	Thirty-Minute Theatre	Jumbo Boylan	Episode: "A Time of Wolves and Tigers"
1968	Omnibus	The Whisky Priest	Episode: "Graham Greene: The Hunted Man"
1969	Red Peppers	Bert Bentley	Television film
1969	David Copperfield	Barkis	Television film
1970	On Trial	Marshal Philippe Pétain	Episode: "Marshal Pétain – A Matter of Honour"
1970	The Sinners	The Monsignor	Episode: "The Bosom of the Country"
1971	Poet Game	Dr. Saunders	Television film
1971	Shirley's World	Charlie	Episode: "The Reunion"
1972	Clochemerle	Mayor Barthelemy Piechut	Miniseries; 6 episodes
1972	The Golden Bowl	Bob Assingham	Miniseries; 6 episodes
1972	Them	Coat Sleeves	5 episodes
1972	The Hands of Cormac Joyce	Mr. Reece	Television film
1973	Orson Welles Great Mysteries	Mr. White	Episode: "The Monkey's Paw"
1973	ITV Sunday Night Theatre	Father Manus	Episode: "Catholics"
1976	BBC2 Playhouse	Adler	Episode: "The Mind Beyond: The Man with the Power"
1977	Thursday Play Date	Fox Melarkey	Episode: "Crystal and Fox"
1977	Jesus of Nazareth	Yehuda	Miniseries; 4 episodes
1977	Jackanory	The Storyteller	5 episodes
1978	Les Misérables	Fauchelevent	Television film
1980	Strumpet City	Father Giffley	Miniseries; 6 episodes
1980	Cry of the Innocent	Tom Moloney	Television film
1980–84	Tales of the Unexpected	Michael Fish / Percy Hampton	Episodes: "The HItch-Hiker" & "Accidental Death"
1981	The Little World of Don Camillo	Narrator (voice)	13 episodes
1981	No Country for Old Men	Tom Sheridan	Television film
1981	Maybury	Mac	Episode: "Maisie and Mac"
1981	Andrina	Captain Bill Torvald	Television film
1982	The Kingfisher	Hawkins	Television film
1982	The Ghost Downstairs	Mr. Fishbane	Television film
1983	Death of an Expert Witness	Mr. Lorimer	Miniseries; 2 episodes
1983	Glenroe	Uncle Peter	
1983	One of Ourselves	Quigley	Television film
1983	BBC/Time-Life Shakespeare	Aegeon	Episode: "The Comedy of Errors"
1984	Two by Forsyth		Television film
1984	Play for Today	Mr. Reed	Episode: "Rainy Day Women"
1984	Dr. Fischer of Geneva	Steiner	Television film
1986	Robin of Sherwood	Agravaine	Episode: "The Inheritance"
1986	The Theban Plays by Sophocles	Priest	Episode: "Oedipus the King"
1988	The Ray Bradbury Theater	Dr. Jeffers	Episode: "The Small Assassin"
1988	Menace Unseen	Mr. Simmondson	Miniseries; 3 episodes
1988	The Tenth Man	The Priest	Television film
1989	Danny, the Champion of the World	Doc Spencer	Television film
1992	Screen Two	Percy	Episode: "Memento Mori"
1993	The Young Indiana Jones Chronicles	George Clemenceau	Episode: "Paris, May 1919"

== Theatre credits ==
=== With the Abbey Theatre ===
Year	Title	Role	Other notes	Refs.
1932	The Vigil	The Boy		
1932	Wrack	Hughie Boyle		
1933	Drama at Inish	Michael		
1934	Parnell of Avondale	Countryman		
1934	Macbeth	Malcolm		
1934	Six Characters in Search of an Author	The Son		
1934	At Mrs. Beams	Colin Langford		
1935	Candida	Marchbanks		
1935	Noah	Japheth		
1935	Summer's Day	Curran		
1935	The King of Spain's Daughter	Jim Harris		
1935	An Páistín Fionn	N/A	As director	
1936	Coriolanus	Titus Larius		
1936	Boyd's Shop	Andy		
1936	Katie Roche	Jo Mahoney		
1936	The Passing Day	Hind		
1936	The Silver Jubilee	John Joseph Barrett		
1936	The Jailbird	Mr. Bunton		
1937	Shadow and Substance	O'Flingsley		
1937	Quin's Secret	Quin		
1937	Killycreggs in Twilight	Loftus de Lury		
1937	The Patriot	Dan Cusack		
1937	The Man in the Cloak	Mangan		
1937	The Invincibles	Kelly		
1937	An Phíb Fé Sna Bántaibh	N/A	As director	
1937	Cartney and Kevney	Cartney		
1937	She Had to Do Something	Neddy		
1937	An tÉirighe Amach	N/A	As director	
1937	Aon-Mhac Aoife Alban	N/A	As director	
1938	Bird's Nest	Hyacinth		
1939	Give Him a House	Pat Hooey		
1939	They Went by Bus	John Joe Martin		
1942	The Storm	Cuiliogan		
1943	An Traona sa Mhóinfhéar	An 'Máistir'		
1943	Faustus Kelly	Town Clerk		
1943	The Bride	Dr. Jack Power O'Connor		
1943	Poor Man's Miracle	Joseph		
1944	The Wise Have Not Spoken	Francis		
1944	The New Regime	Jim M'Cuttack		
1944	The Shadow of a Gunman	Mr. Gallagher		
1944	The Plough and the Stars	The Covey		
1944	Grogan and the Ferret	Mr. Dobbin		
1944	Sodar I nDiaidh na nUasal	Dorante		
1944	The Jailbird	Mr. Bunton		
1944	Shadow and Substance	Dermot Francis O'Flingsley		
1944	Old Road	Myles Cosgrave		
1944	The Player Queen	Stage Manager		
1944	The Whiteheaded Boy	Denis		
1944	Boyd's Shop	John Haslett		
1944	The End House	Seumas		
1945	Juno and the Paycock	Johnny Boyle		
1945	Rossa	Judge Keogh		
1945	Tenants at Will	Dawson		
1945	The Plough and the Stars	The Covey		
1945	The Playboy of the Western World	Christy Mahon		
1966	Recall The Years	Performer		
1967–68	The Shaughraun	Conn		
1968	The Cherry Orchard	Leonid Andreieveitch Gayev		
1970	Hadrian the Seventh	Frederick William Rolfe		
1974–75	The Vicar of Wakefield	Dr. Primrose		
1976	The Plough and the Stars	Fluther Good		
1978	Uncle Vanya	Ivan Petrovich Voinitsky		
1978	You Never Can Tell	Walter		
1979	A Life	Desmond Drumm		
1980	John Bull's Other Island	Father Peter Keegan		
1980	A Life	Desmond Drumm		
1984	The Merchant of Venice	Shylock		
1989	The Lower Depths	Luka		

=== With the Gate Theatre ===
Year	Title	Role	Other notes	Refs.
1933	A Bride for the Unicorn	Egbert the Eccentric		
1935	A Deuce O' Jacks	Various characters		
1940	Les Parents terribles	Michel		
1942	Tar Éis an Aifrinn	N/A	As playwright	
1945	Tareis an Aifrinn		Also playwright	
1990	Three Sisters	Ivan Romanovich Chebutykin		

=== With the National Theatre Company ===
Year	Title	Role	Other notes	Refs.
1964	Andorra	Can	At The Old Vic	
1974	The Tempest	Antonio	At The Old Vic	
1974	Spring Awakening	Masked Man	At The Old Vic	
1977	The Plough and the Stars	Fluther Good	At the Royal National Theatre	

=== With the Royal Shakespeare Company ===
Year	Title	Role	Other notes	Refs.
1963	The Physicists	Johann Wilhelm Stettler	At the Royal National Theatre	
1963	Julius Caesar	Cassius	At the Royal Shakespeare Theatre	

=== Other venues ===
Year	Title	Role	Theatre	Other notes	Refs.
1918	Arrah-na-Pogue		Tour		
1920	Dick Whittington	The Cat	Tour		
1920	The Sign of the Cross		Tour		
1920	Shot at Dawn		Tour		
1920	The Terror		Tour		
1922	Ali Baba	The Donkey	Tour		
1922	The Babes in the Wood	Babe	Tour		
1924	Irish and Proud of It	The Boy	Tour		
1928	Tilly of Bloomsbury	Indian student	Norwich Repertory Company		
1928	Mr. Wu	Carruthers	Norwich Repertory Company		
1928	Milestones		Norwich Repertory Company		
1928	The Promised Land		Norwich Repertory Company		
1928	Ambrose Applejohn's Adventure		Norwich Repertory Company		
1935	Gruagach Dúr an Deagh-Chroidhe	N/A		As director	
1936	Ah, Wilderness!	Richard	Ambassadors Theatre	London debut	
1939	The Playboy of the Western World	Christy Mahon	Mercury Theatre		
1939	The Plough and the Stars	The Covey	Q Theatre		
1940	Les Parents terribles	Michel	Gate Theatre		
1941	Thunder Rock	Streeter	St Martin's Theatre		
1942	The Doctor's Dilemma	Louis Dubedat	Theatre Royal Haymarket		
1950	Pommy	Nosey	People's Palace, Mile End		
1954	The Playboy of the Western World	Christy Mahon	Théâtre de la Ville		
1957	A Moon for the Misbegotten	Phil Hogan	Bijou Theatre		
1958	Casement	Roger Casement	Theatre Royal Waterford		
1959	Goodwill Ambassador	Seumas O'Beirne	Olympia Theatre, Dublin		
1960	Goodwill Ambassador	Seumas O'Beirne	Shubert Theatre		
1960	Goodwill Ambassador	Seumas O'Beirne	Wilbur Theatre		
1960	Krapp's Last Tape	Krapp	Empire Theatre, Belfast		
1960	Arms and the Man	Bluntschli	Empire Theatre, Belfast		
1960	Arms and the Man	Bluntschli	Queen's Theatre, Dublin		
1960	The Voices of Doolin	Doolin	Tour		
1961	The Temptation of Mr. O	Mr. O	Olympia Theatre, Dublin	Also playwright	
1968	The Shaughraun	Conn	Aldwych Theatre		
1968	The Cherry Orchard	Gayev	Olympia Theatre, Dublin	Dublin Theatre Festival	
1970	Hadrian the Seventh	Frederick William Rolfe	Tour		
1970	Coriolanus	Menenius	John F. Kennedy Theatre		
1970	Coriolanus	Menenius	The Old Vic		
1976	The Plough and the Stars	Fluther Good	Tour		
1978	You Never Can Tell	Walter	Tour		
1980	A Life	Desmond Drumm	The Old Vic		
1980	A Life	Desmond Drumm	Tour		
