= Derbhle Crotty =

Irish actress (born 1968)

Derbhle Crotty is an Irish actress. She was born in County Cavan, Ireland in 1968.

She studied law in UCD in the late 1980s joining Dramsoc and then pursued the performance course at the Samuel Beckett Centre, Trinity College Dublin.

She was a member of the Abbey Theatre from 1994 - 2009 where she was involved in many productions. Amongst her earliest jobs at the Abbey was a role in Marina Carr's breakthrough play The Mai in 1994, and later the lead in Carr's Portia Coughlan for Garry Hynes, she also played the title role in a long neglected play from the 1930s by Irish Playwright Teresa Deevy called Katie Roche, this was directed by Judy Friel.

Derbhle has worked extensively in London and has appeared in many National Theatre and RSC productions.

In 2008 she was awarded the Irish Times Theatre Awards for best actress in the Abbey production of Three Sisters where she played the part of Masha. She won it for a 2nd time in 2015 for her portrayal of King Henry IV for Druid Theatre Company's production Druid Shakespeare.

== Playography ==
- The Mai (1994)
- Portia Coughlan (1996)
- Katie Roche (1994)
