= Juno and the Paycock =

1924 play by Seán O'Casey

- Original language: English
- Written by: Seán O'Casey
- Characters: Juno Boyle; Captain Jack Boyle "Joxer" Daly; Mary Boyle; Johnny Boyle; Maisie Madigan; Charles Bentham; Jerry Devine; Mrs Tancred "Needle" Nugent; Irregulars; Furniture Removers; Sewing-Machine Man; Neighbours
- Series: Dublin Trilogy
- Setting: Tenement room, Dublin, 1922

Premiere
- Date: 3 March 1924
- Place: Abbey Theatre

Juno and the Paycock is a play by Seán O'Casey. Highly regarded and often performed in Ireland, it was first staged at the Abbey Theatre in Dublin in 1924. It is set in the working-class tenements of Dublin in the early 1920s, during the Irish Civil War period. The word paycock is a colloquial Irish pronunciation of "peacock", which is what Juno accuses her husband of being.

It is the second of his "Dublin Trilogy" – the other two plays being The Shadow of a Gunman (1923) and The Plough and the Stars (1926).

== Plot ==
=== Act I ===
Juno and the Paycock takes place in the tenements of Dublin in 1922, just after the outbreak of the Irish Civil War, and revolves around the misfortunes of the dysfunctional Boyle family. The father, "Captain" Jack (so called because of his propensity for telling greatly exaggerated stories of his short career as a merchant seaman), is a loafer who claims to be unable to work because of pains in his legs, which mysteriously appear whenever someone mentions work. Despite his family's poverty, Jack spends all his time and money at the pub with Joxer Daly, his ne'er-do-well "butty," instead of looking for a job. The mother, Juno (so called because all of the important events in her life took place in June), is the only member of the family currently working, as daughter Mary is on strike and son Johnny is disabled, having lost his arm in the War of Independence. Mary feels guilty about dumping her boyfriend and fellow striker, Jerry Devine, who feels more strongly for her than she does for him. Meanwhile, Johnny agonises over his betrayal of his friend Robbie Tancred, a neighbour and former comrade in the IRA, who was subsequently murdered by Free State supporters; Johnny is terrified that the IRA will execute him as punishment for being an informant. Near the end of the act, one of Jack's relatives dies, and a schoolteacher, Charles Bentham, brings news that the Boyles have come into a large inheritance; Bentham notes aloud that the will names "John Boyle, [my] first cousin, of Dublin" as one of the beneficiaries. Overjoyed with the news, Jack vows to Juno to end his friendship with Joxer and change his ways.

=== Act II ===
A mere two days after receiving Mr Bentham's news, Jack has already begun flaunting his newfound wealth by purchasing a new suit, new furniture, a gramophone, and other luxuries on credit, in anticipation of receiving the inheritance. The Boyles throw a party and invite Bentham, who is courting Mary. Joxer is present, Jack having already forgotten his vow to break off contact with him, and Mrs Maisie Madigan, a neighbour to whom Jack owes money, shows up after having been invited in Act I. During the party, Robbie Tancred's funeral procession passes the tenement, but the Boyles and their guests halt their carousing only when Tancred's grieving mother stops at their door. Juno goes out to offer support to Mrs Tancred, who delivers a monologue mourning the loss of her son and praying for an end to the war, but Jack selfishly ignores her suffering.

=== Act III ===
Two months later, Bentham abruptly ceases all contact with the family and abandons Mary, who, it is revealed, is secretly carrying his child out of wedlock. While Jack is sleeping, Juno takes Mary to the doctor. Soon after they leave, Needle Nugent, the local tailor, storms into the flat and repossesses Jack's suit. Then Mrs Madigan arrives, demanding repayment of the loan she gave Jack; when he refuses to pay, she takes the gramophone as recompense. Joxer (who was present for both incidents, and did nothing to help) needles Jack about rumours that the inheritance is not forthcoming; this soon devolves into an argument during which Joxer openly mocks Jack's fortune as fraudulent. While Johnny upbraids his father for embarrassing the family, Juno returns alone and delivers the news of Mary's pregnancy. As Juno pleads with Jack to use the leftover money from the inheritance to move the family to a different city, he angrily reveals that they will receive nothing due to an error Bentham made while drafting the will (he failed to include the beneficiaries' names, referring to Jack only as "[my] first cousin"). As a result, numerous relations are claiming the inheritance, which is rapidly being eaten up by legal costs; to make matters worse, Bentham has apparently fled the country out of shame. Johnny berates his father for his shortsightedness and avarice. Unable to cope with the stress of the situation, Jack disowns Mary and retreats to the pub to drink with Joxer. Johnny persuades Juno to follow Jack and beg him to come home. Mary returns, and Johnny disowns her as well. Jerry Devine shows up to patch things up with Mary, but he too renounces her when he learns of her pregnancy. As the last of Jack's fancy new furniture is being repossessed, several IRA men arrive and drag Johnny away; Juno later hears from Mrs Madigan that a body resembling Johnny's has been found on a country road, riddled with bullets. Juno decides that Jack will never take on his responsibilities as a father and breadwinner, so she leaves to make a better life for herself and Mary. She sends Mary to live with a relative and, before going to the police station to identify Johnny's body, delivers a monologue that echoes Mrs Tancred's in Act II. Some time later, Jack stumbles home from the pub with Joxer, extremely drunk and unaware that his son is dead or that his wife and daughter have left him. After a brief conversation, Jack accidentally drops his last sixpence on the floor; he drunkenly mourns that "the whole world is in a terrible state o' chassis" before passing out.

== Original production ==
The play was first performed at the Abbey Theatre on 3 March 1924.

Cast:

- Sara Allgood as Juno Boyle
- Barry Fitzgerald as Captain Jack Boyle
- F. J. McCormick as Joxer Daly
- Eileen Crowe as Mary Boyle
- Arthur Shields as Johnny Boyle
- Maureen Delany as Mrs Maisie Madigan
- Gabriel J. Fallon as Charles Bentham
- P. J. Carolan as Jerry Devine
- Christine Murphy as Mrs Tancred
- Maurice Esmonde as First Irregular
- Michael J. Dolan as Second Irregular / Needle Nugent
- Peter Nolan as First Furniture Remover / Sewing Machine Man
- Tony Quinn as Second Furniture Remover / Coal-Block Vendor
- Irene Murphy and Eileen O'Kelly as Two Neighbours

Production team:

- Musical Direction: Dr. J. F. Larchet
- Producer: Michael J. Dolan
- Stage Manager: F. J. McCormick

== Quotes ==
- "I ofen looked up at the sky an' assed meself the question – what is the moon, what is the stars?" – Captain Boyle, Act I
- "Th' whole worl's in a terrible state o' chassis" – Captain Boyle, Act III, the final line of the play.
- "Never tired o' lookin' for a rest" – Juno Boyle, Act I
- "it's nearly time we had a little less respect for the dead, an' a little more regard for the living." – Juno Boyle, Act II
- "Isn't all religions curious?-if they weren't you wouldn't get anyone to believe in them" – Captain Boyle, Act II
- "It'll have what's far better- it'll have two mothers" – Juno Boyle, Act III
- "A darlin' (noun), a daarlin' (repeat noun)!" – Joxer's habitual exclamation throughout the play as he trivialises everything
- "It doesn't matter what you say, ma – a principle's a principle." – Mary Boyle speaking about the strike
- "He ought to be here." – Johnny on Boyle's absence
- "Mother o' God, Mother o' God, have pity on us all! Blessed Virgin, where were you when me darlin' son was riddled with bullets, when me darlin' son was riddled with bullets? Sacred Heart o' Jesus, take away our hearts o' stone, and give us hearts o' flesh! Take away this murderin' hate, an' give us Thine own eternal love!" - Juno, final lines, act III

== Adaptations ==
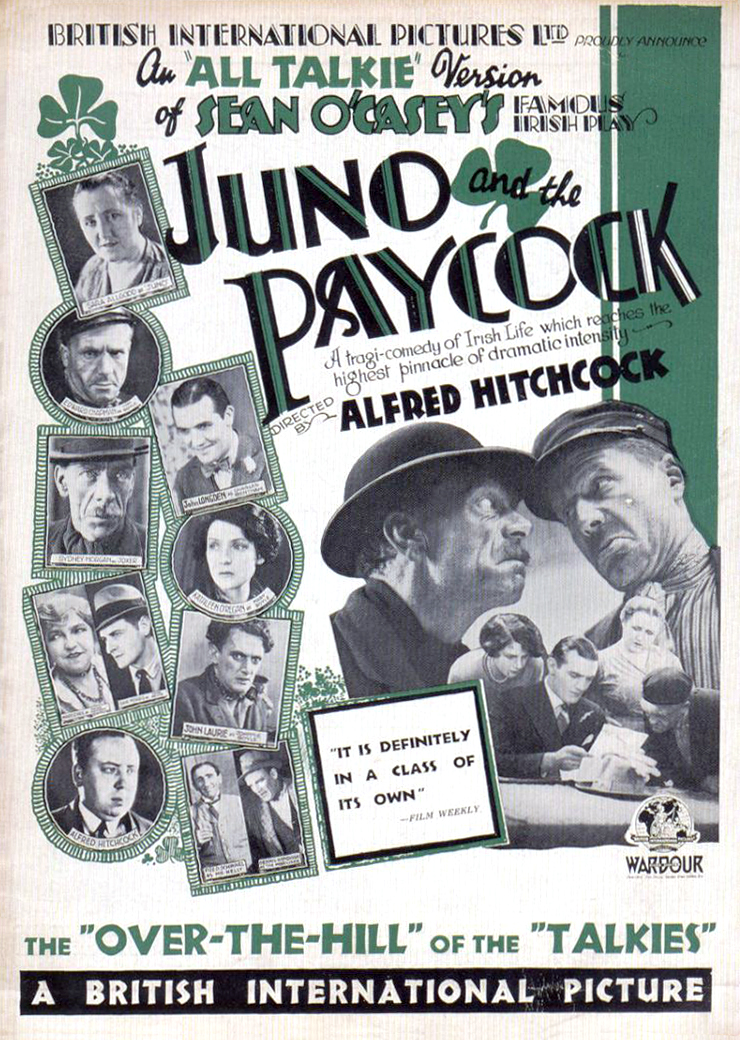
UK pressbook

=== Film ===
In 1930, a British film adaptation of the play was produced, which was directed by Alfred Hitchcock. In the United States, it was also known by the title The Shame of Mary Boyle.

==== Cast ====
- Barry Fitzgerald as The Orator
- Maire O'Neill as Mrs Maisie Madigan
- Edward Chapman as Captain Boyle
- Sidney Morgan as "Joxer" Daly
- Sara Allgood as Mrs Boyle ("Juno")
- Kathleen O'Regan as Mary Boyle
- John Laurie as Johnny Boyle

=== Television ===
There are various television adaptations of Juno and the Paycock:

- 1938, BBC Television: starring Maire O'Neill as Juno and Harry Hutchinson as Captain Jack.
- 1951, BBC TV: starring Shela Ward and John Kelly.
- 1952, Canadian TV: starring Nancy Pyper and Frank Peddie.
- 1957, BBC TV: starring Peggy Marshall and Liam Redmond.
- 1960: US TV, starring Hume Cronyn and Walter Matthau.
- 1980, BBC TV: Starring Frances Tomelty as Juno and Dudley Sutton as Captain Jack.

=== Radio ===
At least 11 adaptations have been produced for BBC Radio. Four of the first five starred Maire O'Neill, who previously appeared in Hitchcock's film as Juno's sister Mrs. Maisie Madigan.

- 1937, adapted by Patrick Riddell and produced by Peter Creswell.
- 1941, adapted by Patrick Riddell and produced by James Mageean.
- 1942, adapted by L. A. G. Strong and produced by Joh Burrell.
- 1946, adapted by Patrick Riddell and produced by Fred O'Donovan.
- 1951, adapted by Patrick Riddell and produced by Fred O'Donovan.
- 1957, adapted by Patrick Riddell and produced by John Gibson.
- 1962, produced by Sam Langdon.
- 1976, produced and directed by Michael Heffernan.
- 1980, produced by Prudence Fitzgerald and directed by Roger Chevely.
- 1997, directed by Pam Brighton.

The most recent production was broadcast 16 November 2014 on BBC Radio 3, adapted and directed by Peter Kavanagh with:

- Sorcha Cusack as Juno Boyle
- Stanley Townsend as Captain Boyle
- John Kavanagh as Joxer
- Beth Cooke as Mary Boyle
- Rory Fleck Byrne as Johnny Boyle
- Michele Moran as Maisie Madigan

=== Sound recordings ===
O'Casey "Recorded at his home in Totnes, Devon on November 12, 1952" the play's opening and closing scenes. These were issued on LP by Caedmon Records in the US, coupled with similar extracts from his autobiographies Inishfallen, Fare Thee Well (1949) and Pictures in the Hallway (1942). Caedmon also released a 1960 7" in the UK, just containing the Juno readings.

A full recording of the play was made by Cyril Cusack Productions in June 1955, in association with the Abbey Theatre, Dublin. It was issued as a boxed double LP by Angel Records and regular LP by Columbia Records in the UK. In the US, it was originally issued by Seraphim Records and reissued in 1973 by Caedmon Records. The performance has a spoken introduction by O'Casey. The cast includes:

- Séamus Caomhánach as Captain Jack
- Siobhán McKenna as Juno Boyle
- Cyril Cusack as Joxer Daly
- Maire Kean as Mrs. Maisie Madigan
- Leo Leyden as Jonny Boyle
- Maureen Cusack as Mary Boyle
- Harry Brogan as "Needle" Nugent, a tailor

=== Musical ===
A musical adaptation of the play, titled Juno, was created by Marc Blitzstein (music, lyrics) and Joseph Stein (book) and opened on Broadway on 9 March 1959. Shirley Booth starred as Juno Boyle and Melvyn Douglas as the Captain. The musical version was a flop, closing after 16 performances, but Blitzstein's score was preserved on the original cast album and is today considered one of the composer's masterpieces. O'Casey gave his blessing to the project, but never saw the production.

==== Cast ====
- Shirley Booth as Juno Boyle
- Melvyn Douglas as Captain Boyle
- Jack MacGowran as Joxer
- Tommy Rall as Johnny Boyle
