= Calam Lynch =

Irish-English actor (born 1994)

- Born: Calam Finbar Lynch; 7 November 1994 (age 31); Warwickshire, England
- Education: Somerville College, Oxford
- Occupation: Actor
- Years active: 2017–present
- Parents: Finbar Lynch (father); Niamh Cusack (mother)
- Relatives: Sinéad Cusack (aunt); Sorcha Cusack (aunt); Catherine Cusack (aunt); Pádraig Cusack (uncle); Cyril Cusack (grandfather); Maureen Cusack (grandmother); Max Irons (cousin); Richard Boyd Barrett (cousin)

Calam Finbar Lynch (born 7 November 1994) is an Irish-English actor. His films include the Disney adaptation of Black Beauty (2020) and Terence Davies' Benediction (2021). On television, he appeared in the BBC One drama Mrs Wilson (2018), the second season of the Netflix series Bridgerton (2022), the Sky Atlantic series Sweetpea (2024–present), and the Amazon Prime Video shows The Lord of the Rings: The Rings of Power (2022–present) and Ride or Die (2026).

== Early life ==
Lynch was born in Warwickshire to Irish actors Niamh Cusack and Finbar Lynch. He spent some of his childhood in Mottram St Andrew, Cheshire and went to the local primary school while his parents worked in Manchester. They then moved to Barnes, South West London. Lynch attended Latymer Upper School in Hammersmith before going on to study classics at Somerville College, Oxford, graduating in 2017. Originally interested in football, he became inspired to act by his cousin Max Irons and participated in stage productions during his time at university.

== Career ==
In his third and final year at Oxford, Lynch signed with an agent and appeared in Dunkirk. After graduating, he played Claudio in the Rose Theatre Kingston production of Much Ado About Nothing and Gordon Wilson, the son of the titular character played by Ruth Wilson in the BBC One miniseries Mrs Wilson. That same year, Lynch had a guest role as John-Paul O'Reilly in an episode of the Channel 4 sitcom Derry Girls. He appeared in Wife at the Kiln Theatre in 2019.

Lynch starred in the 2020 adaptation of Black Beauty opposite Mackenzie Foy, which was released on Disney+. He played Stephen Tennant in the Terence Davies-directed biographical film Benediction followed by the role of Theo Sharpe in season 2 of the Netflix period drama Bridgerton. He portrayed young Cary Grant in the ITV miniseries Archie. In 2022, it was announced that Lynch will appear in a recurring role in the second season of the Amazon Prime Video fantasy series The Lord of the Rings: The Rings of Power.

The following year, 2023, Lynch was cast as AJ in the Sky Atlantic dark comedy series Sweetpea and as Tom Fowle in Miss Austen. He went on to play Bryan Guinness in the television series Outrageous that premiered on BritBox in 2025. He played Max in the BAFTA Television Awards nominated series What It Feels Like for a Girl.

In March 2026, Lynch was announced to portray Brian Epstein in Please Please Me, an original play by Tom Wright, staged at the Kiln Theatre. This is Lynch's first lead role in a theatre production and he received widespread acclaim for his moving and charismatic portrayal of Epstein.

Lynch joined Octavia Spencer and Hannah Waddingham in the Amazon Prime Video action adventure comedy series Ride or Die as Sam, which premiered in July 2026.

== Filmography ==
=== Film ===
Year	Title	Role	Notes	Ref.
2017	Dunkirk	Deal Sailor		
2020	Black Beauty	George Winthorp		
2021	Benediction	Stephen Tennant		
2026	Once Upon a Time in a Cinema	Gerald Clancy		

=== Television ===
Year	Title	Role	Notes	Ref.
2018	Mrs Wilson	Gordon Wilson	Main cast	
2019	Derry Girls	John Paul O'Reilly	Episode: "The Prom"	
2022	Bridgerton	Theo Sharpe	Main cast (Season 2)	
2023	The Long Shadow	PC Robert Hydes	Episode #1.7	
2023	Archie	Cary Grant	Main cast	
2024	The Lord of the Rings: The Rings of Power	Camnir	Season 2	
2024-Present	Sweetpea	AJ	Main cast	
2025	Miss Austen	Tom Fowle	Main cast	
2025	Outrageous	Bryan Guinness	Main cast	
2025	What It Feels Like for a Girl	Max	3 episodes	
2026	Ride or Die	Sam	Main cast	

== Stage ==
Year	Title	Role	Venue	Ref.
2018	Much Ado About Nothing	Claudio	Rose Theatre Kingston, London	
2019	Wife	Eric / Cas	Kiln Theatre, London	
2023	Ghosts	Oswald	Abbey Theatre, Dublin	
2026	Please Please Me	Brian Epstein	Kiln Theatre, London	

== Audio ==
Year	Title	Role	Notes	Ref.
2025	Next Season	Tom Chester / Paul Paulson	BBC Radio 4	
2026	The Legend of Sleepy Hollow	Ichabod Crane	BBC Radio 4	
2026	The Murder at the Vicarage	Lawrence Redding	Audible Original	
2026	Out of Time	Bertie	BBC Radio 4	

== Music video appearances ==
Year	Title	Artist	Director	Ref.
2024	"I Only Smoke When I Drink"	Nimino	Oskar Brockbank	
