= Mint Theater Company =

- Formation: 1992
- Founder: Kelly Morgan
- Type: Off-Broadway theatre group
- Location(s): Theatre Row Building; New York City
- Artistic director: Jonathan Bank
- Website: minttheater.org

Mint Theater Company was founded in 1992 in New York City. Their mission is to find, produce, and advocate for "worthwhile plays from the past that have been lost or forgotten". They have been instrumental in restoring the theatrical legacy of several playwrights notably; Teresa Deevy, Rachel Crothers, and Miles Malleson. In addition to producing less produced or forgotten works by noted playwrights such as A. A. Milne, Lillian Hellman, and J. M. Barrie, they have also produced frequently ignored theatrical works by noted authors such as Ernest Hemingway, D. H. Lawrence, and Leo Tolstoy.

New York Times critic Ben Brantley credited Mint Theater Company as a "resurrectionist extraordinaire of forgotten plays". pointing to the company as a torchbearer "devoted to overlooked plays of other times."

== History ==
The Mint Theater Company was founded in 1992 by Kelly Morgan. The mission was further solidified when Jonathan Bank took over as artistic director in 1995, deciding to focus on lost, neglected, or forgotten plays. This focus came from his interest in narrative driven plays that audiences didn't already know. The company's full commitment to neglected works came as audience interest in seeing recovered plays increased, eventually prompting the company to re-establish their mission and change their slogan to "Lost Plays Found Here."

They have done significant work to revive the works of several playwrights who had fallen into obscurity. Their on-going Teresa Deevy Project works to rediscover, produce, and publish works of Irish playwright Teresa Deevy, who despite early success and several productions at the Dublin Abbey Theatre during her lifetime has been largely neglected and her work forgotten. The Mint Theater has produced four plays and published two anthologies of Deevy's work.

The theater's revival of Rachel Crothers' Susan and God in 2006 was the first New York City revival since 1943. Crothers' work had rarely been seen since her death in 1953. The theater also revived her Pulitzer Prize nominated play, A Little Journey in 2011.

They have also revived or sometimes premiered neglected works by famous authors. In 2008 they produced Hemingway's The Fifth Column, using the original text, the first professional production to do so as the 1940 Broadway production used an adapted script by Benjamin Glazer which Hemingway ultimately did not approve. They have produced both of D. H. Lawrence's plays, The Daughter-in-Law in 2003 and The Widowing of Mrs. Holroyd in 2009.

In addition to citations for individual productions, the company has received several awards. In 2001 they received an Obie Grant. In 2002 they were awarded a Drama Desk Special Award for "unearthing, presenting and preserving forgotten plays of merit". In 2010 they were awarded The Theatre Museum's Theatre History Preservation Award.

== Notable productions ==
- A Day by the Sea by N. C. Hunter
- Alison's House by Susan Glaspell
- A Little Journey by Rachel Crothers
- Becomes A Woman by Betty Smith
- Conflict by Miles Malleson
- Garside's Career by Harold Brighouse
- Hindle Wakes by Stanley Houghton
- Katie Roche by Teresa Deevy
- Miss Lulu Bett by Zona Gale
- So Help Me God! by Maurine Dallas Watkins
- Susan and God by Rachel Crothers
- Temporal Powers by Teresa Deevy
- The Daughter-in-Law by D.H. Lawrence
- The Fifth Column by Ernest Hemingway
- The Power of Darkness by Leo Tolstoy
- The Price of Thomas Scott by Elizabeth Baker
- The Suitcase Under the Bed by Teresa Deevy
- Wife to James Whelan by Teresa Deevy
- Yours Unfaithfully by Miles Malleson

The Daughter-in-Law, Soldier's Wife, The Return of the Prodigal, So Help Me God!, A Little Journey, London Wall, Fashions For Men, Women Without Men, Hindle Wakes, and Garside's Career were all nominated for the Drama Desk Award for Outstanding Revival of a Play.

== Awards and nominations ==
=== Obie Awards ===
Year	Category	Nominated work	Recipient	Result	Ref.
2001	Obie Grant	Body of work	Mint Theater Company	Won	

=== Drama Desk Awards ===
Year	Category	Nominated work	Recipient	Result	Ref.
2002	Drama Desk Special Award	Body of work	Mint Theater Company	Won	
2004	Outstanding Revival of a Play	The Daughter-in-Law	Mint Theater Company	Nominated	
2004	Outstanding Featured Actress in a Play	The Daughter-in-Law	Mikel Sarah Lambert	Nominated	
2005	Outstanding Actress in a Play	Echoes of War	Frances Sternhagen	Nominated	
2006	Outstanding Revival of a Play	Soldier's Wife	Mint Theater Company	Nominated	
2006	Outstanding Featured Actress in a Play	Soldier's Wife	Judith Hawking	Nominated	
2006	Outstanding Set Design	Walking Down Broadway	Roger Hanna	Nominated	
2008	Outstanding Revival of a Play	The Return of the Prodigal	Mint Theater Company	Nominated	
2008	Outstanding Set Design	The Return of the Prodigal	Clint Ramos	Nominated	
2010	Outstanding Revival of a Play	So Help Me God!	Mint Theater Company	Nominated	
2010	Outstanding Director of a Play	So Help Me God!	Jonathan Bank	Nominated	
2010	Outstanding Actress in a Play	So Help Me God!	Kristen Johnston	Nominated	
2010	Outstanding Costume Design	So Help Me God!	Clint Ramos	Nominated	
2012	Outstanding Revival of a Play	A Little Journey	Mint Theater Company	Nominated	
2012	Outstanding Set Design	A Little Journey	Roger Hanna	Nominated	
2014	Outstanding Revival of a Play	London Wall	Mint Theater Company	Nominated	
2014	Outstanding Featured Actress in a Play	London Wall	Julia Coffey	Nominated	
2015	Outstanding Revival of a Play	Fashions For Men	Mint Theater Company	Nominated	
2015	Outstanding Set Design	Fashions For Men	Daniel Zimmerman	Nominated	
2015	Outstanding Actress in a Play	The Fatal Weakness	Kristin Griffith	Nominated	
2015	Outstanding Costume Design	The Fatal Weakness	Andrea Varga	Nominated	
2015	Outstanding Projection Design	Donogoo	Roger Hanna	Nominated	
2016	Outstanding Revival of a Play	Women Without Men	Mint Theater Company	Nominated	
2016	Outstanding Director of a Play	Women Without Men	Jenn Thompson	Nominated	
2016	Outstanding Featured Actress in a Play	Women Without Men	Kellie Overbey	Nominated	
2016	Outstanding Costume Design	Women Without Men	Martha Hally	Nominated	
2016	Outstanding Wig and Hair Design	Women Without Men	Robert-Charles Vallance	Nominated	
2018	Outstanding Revival of a Play	Hindle Wakes	Mint Theater Company	Nominated	
2023	Outstanding Set Design	Chains	John McDermott	Nominated	
2025	Outstanding Revival of a Play	Gareside's Career	Mint Theater Company	Nominated	

=== Outer Critics Circle Awards ===
Year	Category	Nominated work	Recipient	Result	Ref.
2015	Outstanding Revival of a Play	Fashions For Men	Mint Theater Company	Nominated	
2023	Outstanding Off-Broadway Play	Becomes a Woman	Mint Theater Company	Nominated	
2023	Outstanding Lead Performer in an Off-Broadway Play	Becomes a Woman	Emma Pfitzer Price	Nominated	

=== Lucille Lortel Awards ===
Year	Category	Nominated work	Recipient	Result	Ref.
2009	Outstanding Revival of a Play	The Glass Cage	Mint Theater Company	Nominated	
2009	Outstanding Scenic Design	The Glass Cage	Roger Hanna	Won	
2009	Outstanding Sound Design	The Widowing of Mrs. Holroyd	Jane Shaw	Nominated	
2010	Outstanding Costume Design	So Help Me God!	Clint Ramos	Won	
2014	Outstanding Revival of a Play	London Wall	Mint Theater Company	Nominated	
2015	Outstanding Revival of a Play	Fashions For Men	Mint Theater Company	Nominated	
2016	Outstanding Revival of a Play	Women Without Men	Mint Theater Company	Nominated	
2016	Outstanding Costume Design	Women Without Men	Martha Hally	Nominated	

=== Drama League Awards ===
Year	Category	Nominated work	Recipient	Result	Ref.
2009	Distinguished Performance	The Widowing of Mrs. Holroyd	Julia Coffey	Nominated	

=== Theatre World Awards ===
Year	Category	Nominated work	Recipient	Result	Ref.
2023	Outstanding Debut	Becomes a Woman	Emma Pfitzer Price	Won	

=== Off Broadway Alliance Awards ===
Year	Category	Nominated work	Recipient	Result	Ref.
2015	Best Revival of a Play	Fashions For Men	Mint Theater Company	Nominated	
2016	Best Revival of a Play	Women Without Men	Mint Theater Company	Nominated	
2018	Best Revival of a Play	Hindle Wakes	Mint Theater Company	Nominated	
2019	Best Revival of a Play	Conflict	Mint Theater Company	Nominated	
2019	Best Revival of a Play	Days to Come	Mint Theater Company	Nominated	
2022	Best Revival of a Play	The Daughter-in-Law	Mint Theater Company	Nominated	
2023	Best Revival of a Play	The Rat Trap	Mint Theater Company	Nominated	

=== Henry Hewes Awards ===
Year	Category	Nominated work	Recipient	Result	Ref.
2007	Costume Design	The Madras House	Clint Ramos	Won	
2009	Scenic Design	The Glass Cage	Roger Hanna	Nominated	
2010	Costume Design	So Help Me God!	Clint Ramos	Nominated	
2011	Costume Design	Wife to James Whelan	Martha Hally	Nominated	
2011	Scenic Design	What the Public Wants	Roger Hanna	Nominated	
2012	Scenic Design	A Little Journey	Roger Hanna	Nominated	
2014	Lighting Design	London Wall	Nicole Pearce	Nominated	
2014	Costume Design	London Wall	Martha Hally	Nominated	
2015	Notable Affects	Donogoo	Roger Hanna & Price Johnston	Nominated	
2015	Scenic Design	The Fatal Weakness	Vicky Davis	Nominated	
2015	Costume Design	The Fatal Weakness	Andrea Varga	Nominated	
2015	Lighting Design	The Fatal Weakness'	Christian DeAngelis	Nominated	
2016	Scenic Design	The New Morality	Steven C. Kemp	Nominated	
2016	Costume Design	Women Without Men	Martha Hally	Nominated	

=== 1st Irish Awards ===
Year	Category	Nominated work	Recipient	Result	Ref.
2011	Best Production	Temporal Powers	Mint Theater Company	Nominated	
2011	Best Director	Temporal Powers	Jonathan Bank	Nominated	
2011	Best Actor	Temporal Powers	Aidan Redmond	Nominated	
2011	Best Design	Temporal Powers	Vicky Davis	Nominated	

== Publications ==
Mint Theater Company has published six anthologies from the works of authors that they have produced.

- Worthy But Neglected Plays of the Mint Theater Company
  - Featuring the plays; Mr. Pim Passes By by A.A. Milne, The House of Mirth by Edith Wharton and Clyde Fitch, Alison's House by Susan Glaspell, Miss Lulu Bett by Zona Gale, Welcome to Our City by Thomas Wolfe, Diana of Dobson's by Eleanor Reissa, and Rutherford and Son by Githa Sowerby.
- Arthur Schnitzler Reclaimed
  - Featuring the plays; Far and Wide and The Lonely Way by Arthur Schnitzler
- Harley Granville Barker Reclaimed
  - Featuring the plays; The Madras House, The Voysey Inheritance, and Farewell to the Theater by Harley Granville-Barker
- St. John Hankin Reclaimed
  - Featuring the plays; The Charity That Began at Home and The Return of the Prodigal by St. John Hankin
- Teresa Deevy Reclaimed Volume One
  - Featuring the plays; Temporal Powers, Katie Roche, and Wife to James Whelan by Teresa Deevy.
- Teresa Deevy Reclaimed Volume Two
  - Featuring the plays; In Search of Valor, The King of Spain's Daughter, Holiday House, Dignity, Strange Birth, Light Falling, Within a Marble City, Going Beyond Alma's Glory, In the Cellar of My Friend, and One Look and What it Led To by Teresa Deevy.
