= Gabriel Fallon =

Irish theatre critic, actor and theatre director

Gabriel Fallon (1898–10 June 1980) was an Irish theatre critic, actor and theatre director.

== Life and career ==
He was born in Dublin and joined the Civil Service in 1914. He became an actor in the Abbey Theatre, where he remained until 1930 when he started to spend more time on journalism. He was drama critic for the Irish Monthly, Catholic Standard and Evening Press.

In 1946 he produced "Katie Roche" and in 1947 "Wife to James Whelan" , by Irish playwright Teresa Deevy. These were both Raidió Teilifís Éireann productions.

He was director of the Abbey Theatre from 1959 to 1974, his production involvement can be seen in the Abbey Theatre archives

He was married with six children. A devout Catholic, Fallon was an early member of An Ríoghacht.

== Playography ==
- Katie Roche, 1946
- Wife to James Whelan, 1947
