= The Power and the Glory (1961 film) =

1961 TV film based on Graham Greene novel

The Power and the Glory is a 1961 American TV film based on the 1940 novel The Power and the Glory by Graham Greene. It was produced by David Susskind at Talent Associates-Paramount for CBS. The production was shot for American TV but also distributed theatrically overseas.

== Cast ==
- Laurence Olivier as Priest
- George C Scott as Police Lieutenant
- Roddy McDowall as Mestizo
- Martin Gabel as Police Chief
- Julie Harris as Maria
- Keenan Wynn as Bootlegger
- Frank Conroy as Padre Jose
- Mildred Dunnock as Spinster
- Patty Duke as Coral
- Fritz Weaver as Schoolmaster
- Cyril Cusack as Mustafa

== Production ==
It was Olivier's second performance for American television following an acclaimed production of The Moon and Sixpence which won him an Emmy.

Playwright Dale Wasserman wrote the script in seven days.

David Susskind originally wanted Richard Burton to co star with Olivier. The project was announced in April 1961 and the cast finalised in May. It was going to be CBS's "major dramatic production" for the year. The budget was a reported $500,000.

A Mexican township worth $125,000 was built for the production, which was shot at NBC studios, in two studios (although broadcast by CBS). It was one of the most elaborate productions shot for TV at the time.

Taping started 30 May 1961 over a four-week period between the end of Olivier's run in Becket and his return to England. The budget eventually blew out to $746,000 and the running time was 132 minutes. According to makeup artist Dick Smith, the production was "gruelling," with filming often taking over 20 hours a day.

== Reception ==
The New York Times called it "a proverbial milestone and a major disappointment." The Los Angeles Times said it was "less than it could be".
