= Sorcha Cusack =

Irish actress (born 1949)

- Born: 9 April 1949 (age 77); Dublin, Ireland
- Occupation: Actress
- Years active: 1968–present
- Spouse: Nigel Cooke
- Children: 2
- Parent(s): Cyril Cusack; Maureen Kiely
- Relatives: Sinéad Cusack (sister); Niamh Cusack (sister); Pádraig Cusack (brother); Catherine Cusack (paternal half-sister); Richard Boyd Barrett (nephew); Max Irons (nephew); Calam Lynch (nephew)

Sorcha Cusack (Irish pronunciation: [ˈsˠɔɾˠəxə]; born 9 April 1949) is an Irish television and stage actress. Her numerous television credits include playing the title role in Jane Eyre (1973), Casualty (1994–1997), Coronation Street (2008) and Father Brown (2013–2022).

== Early and personal life ==
Cusack was born on 9 April 1949 in Dublin, Ireland. She is the second daughter of the actors Cyril Cusack (1910–1993) and Maureen Cusack (1920–1977), her elder sister is actress Sinéad Cusack, and her younger sister is actress Niamh Cusack. She is a half-sister to Catherine Cusack. Through Sinéad, she is the sister-in-law of actor Jeremy Irons and the aunt of actor Max Irons and his brother, former child actor Samuel Irons. She is married to actor Nigel Cooke with whom she has two children, Liam and Beth.

== Career ==
Cusack has made many film and television appearances including Inspector Morse ("Cherubim and Seraphim", S6:E5, 1992) as Joyce, The Bill, Casualty (as Staff Nurse / Ward Sister Kate Wilson from 1994 to 1997), a BBC adaptation of Jane Eyre (1973), and the film Snatch (2000) as the traveller mother of Mickey, played by Brad Pitt. In 1993, she appeared in Poirot's "Jewel Robbery at the Grand Metropolitan". In 1998, she voiced Mother Duck in the cartoon The First Snow of Winter in the UK Version. She has also acted for radio, including a guest appearance in the BBC Radio 4 series Baldi and starring as Juno Boyle (and appearing with her real-life daughter) in the 2014 BBC Radio 3 production of Juno and the Paycock. She played Helen Connor in Coronation Street in 2008, but because of her other acting commitments, the role was played by Dearbhla Molloy when the character returned in July 2009.

In 2011, Cusack played Prof. Joanna Pinnock in "Wild Justice", S5:E2 of Lewis. In the same year, she portrayed Hillary Nicholson in two episodes of the first series of Mrs. Brown's Boys. Susie Blake took over the role for the second and third series. Despite this, she did play the part of Justice Dickie in the 2014 film Mrs. Brown's Boys D'Movie. She was part of the main cast of the BBC adaptation of Father Brown from series 1 to 9. She played Mrs McCarthy, the housekeeper and parish secretary who makes award-winning scones. Cusack played Bridie Stevenson in the BBC television series River (2015). She also played Marthe, a vampire, the housekeeper at Sept Tours and companion to Ysabeau, in the television series A Discovery Of Witches, based upon the All Souls Trilogy book series by Deborah Harkness.

Cusack has had an extensive career on stage including seasons at the Gate Theatre in Dublin where she made her theatrical debut, the Abbey Theatre, Dublin, the Royal Shakespeare Company, the Royal Exchange, Manchester and The National Theatre in London. Her West End appearances include Maggie in Dancing at Lughnasa and Monica Murray in By the Bog of Cats with Holly Hunter. On Broadway she played Nora Clitheroie in Seán O'Casey's The Plough and the Stars and Lily Doherty in Brian Friel's The Freedom of the City at the Lincoln Centre in 2000. In 2023, she appeared in the Murdoch Mysteries episode "Do the Right Thing" parts 1 and 2.

== Filmography ==
Year	Title	Role	Notes
1978	A Hitch in Time	Miss Campbell	
1982	Angel	Mary	
1998	The First Snow of Winter	Mother	Animated short (voice)
2000	Snatch	Mum O'Neil	
2000	One of the Hollywood Ten	Mrs. McGuire	
2002	Do Armed Robbers Have Love Affairs?	Lynn	Short
2004	(Past Present Future) Imperfect	Diana	
2006	Middletown	Mrs. Lennon	
2006	Rabbit Fever	Ally's mum	
2011	The Italian Key	Older Cabella	(voice)
2011	Lost Christmas	Nan	
2014	Mrs. Brown's Boys D'Movie	Justice Dickie	
2016	The Flag	Aunt Agnes	
2017	Modern Life Is Rubbish	Mary	
2023	Irreverence	Bridget	Short
2023	Chuck Chuck Baby	Gwen	
2024	Shall I be Mother?	Cynthia	Short
TBD †	Wegwerf †	Joyce	Short

== Video games ==
- Elden Ring Shadow of the Erdtree as Hornsent Grandam (voice) (2024)

== Selected theatre performances ==
- Varya in The Cherry Orchard by Anton Chekhov. Directed by Casper Wrede at the Royal Exchange, Manchester (1980)
- Vassillissa in The Lower Depths by Maxim Gorky. Directed by Braham Murray at the Royal Exchange, Manchester (1980)
- Julia in The Duchess of Malfi. Directed by Adrian Noble at the Royal Exchange, Manchester (1980)
- Mary Mcleod in Detective Story by Sidney Kingsley. Directed by John Dillon at the Royal Exchange, Manchester (1982)
- Olga in The Three Sisters by Anton Chekhov in an adaptation by Frank McGuinness. Director by Adrian Noble at the Gate Theatre, Dublin and Royal Court Theatre, London (1990/91)
- Mary Barfoot in The Odd Women by Michael Meyer. World premiere directed by Braham Murray at the Royal Exchange, Manchester (1992)
- Maggie in Dancing at Lughnasa by Brian Friel. Directed by Patrick Mason in London's West End. (1992)
- Wilse in Smoke by Rod Wooden. World premiere directed by Braham Murray at the Royal Exchange, Manchester (1993)
- Lily Doherty in The Freedom of the City by Brian Friel. Directed by Connall Morrison at the Abbey Theatre and Lincoln Centre, New York City (2000)
- Major Barbara by George Bernard Shaw. Directed by Greg Hersov at the Royal Exchange, Manchester (2004)
- Blaize Scully in Portia Coughlan by Marina Carr. Directed by Carrie Cracknell at the Almeida Theatre, London (2023)
