= Catherine Cusack =

British actress

- Born: 21 December 1968 (age 57); London, England
- Occupation: Actress
- Years active: 1987-present
- Spouse: Alex Palmer
- Parents: Cyril Cusack (father); Mary Cunningham (mother)
- Relatives: Sinéad Cusack (half-sister); Sorcha Cusack (half-sister); Niamh Cusack (half-sister); Pádraig Cusack (half-brother); Richard Boyd Barrett (nephew); Max Irons (nephew); Calam Lynch (nephew)

Catherine Cusack (born 21 December 1968) is a British actress. She is best known for portraying Nanny Carmel Finnan in the long-running ITV soap opera Coronation Street in 1992 and 1993.

== Early life and career ==
Cusack was born on 21 December 1968 in London, the half-sister of the actresses Sinéad Cusack, Sorcha Cusack and Niamh Cusack, and the fourth daughter of the Irish actor Cyril Cusack. Catherine's mother was her father's long-term mistress, Mary Rose Cunningham; Catherine was their only child together. Her parents married in 1979 after the death of her father's first wife. She is half-sister to theatre producer Pádraig Cusack and television producer Paul Cusack. She was accepted to study at Royal Holloway and Bedford New College, but became a stage manager at the Tricycle Theatre in London. She made her professional debut in Brendan Behan's play The Hostage before making her television debut in the Doctor Who serial Paradise Towers (1987). She performed on stage with her half-sister Sinéad Cusack in Our Lady of Sligo by Sebastian Barry at the National Theatre in London, the Gate Theatre, Dublin and the Irish Arts Centre in New York.

Catherine Cusack is married to the British actor Alex Palmer.

== Selected filmography ==
- The Lonely Passion of Judith Hearne (1987) ... as Una
- Finding Neverland (2004) as Sarah

== Selected stage roles ==
- Mill on the Floss
- Moonlight
- The Glass Menagerie
- Brighton Rock
- The Seagull
- Bold Girls
- You Never Can Tell
- Poor Beast in the Rain
- Agnes of God
- Veronica's Room
- Nothing Sacred
- Les Liaisons Dangereuses
- Now Is The Hour
- The Two-Character Play
- King Lear

== Selected television roles ==
- Doctor Who: Paradise Towers (1987) ... as Blue Kang Leader
- Sophia and Constance (1988) ... as Constance
- Coronation Street (1992–93) ... as Carmel Finnan
- Ballykissangel (1999–2001) ... as Frankie Sullivan
- The Bill ... as Dawn
- Jonathan Creek (The Seer of the Sands; 2004) ... as Ashley Farr
- The Chief ... as Hilary Scott
- Cadfael ... as Catherine
- The Open Window ... as Vera
- Doctors (2012, 2023) ... as Connie Miller and Bronagh Athy
