= Pádraig Cusack =

Irish theatre producer (born 1962)

- Born: 16 March 1962 (age 64); Dalkey, County Dublin, Ireland
- Education: Trinity College Dublin; Royal Northern College of Music; University College, Cork
- Occupation: Theatre producer
- Years active: 1992–present
- Children: 2
- Parent(s): Cyril Cusack; Maureen Kiely
- Relatives: Sinéad Cusack (sister); Sorcha Cusack (sister); Niamh Cusack (sister); Catherine Cusack (half-sister); Richard Boyd Barrett (nephew); Max Irons (nephew); Calam Lynch (nephew)

Pádraig Cusack (Irish: [ˈpˠaːd̪ˠɾˠəɟ]; born 16 March 1962) is an Irish theatre producer who has worked with the National Theatre of Great Britain, the Abbey Theatre Dublin, the NCPA Mumbai and numerous international festivals.

== Personal life ==
The youngest son of the Irish actor Cyril Cusack and actress Maureen Cusack, he is the brother of actresses Niamh Cusack, Sinéad Cusack and Sorcha Cusack, and half-brother of Catherine Cusack. He has one brother, Paul Cusack (a retired television producer). He is married and has two daughters, Megan, an actress, who in 2020 joined the leading cast in the Netflix/BBC popular series Call the Midwife in the recurring role of Nurse Nancy Corrigan for 5 years while also establishing a stage career with the Abbey Theatre, Druid Theatre and the Royal National Theatre, and Kitty, a psychology graduate who has worked for Adelaide Festival since 2024. Two of his nephews are also actors, Max Irons and Calam Lynch. He lives in West Cork, Ireland.

== Education ==
Cusack was educated bi-lingually in Irish and English, initially at Scoil Lorcáin in Monkstown, Dublin, and subsequently at Coláiste Eoin, Booterstown, County Dublin. Pádraig was a Taylor Exhibition music scholar at Trinity College Dublin, before winning a scholarship to train at the Royal Northern College of Music to be a professional cellist. In 1995, he returned to education to take a post-graduate degree in business at University College, Cork.

== Career ==
Having begun his career as a freelance musician, playing with the BBC Philharmonic Orchestra and English National Opera North, an accident ended his career as a musician, resulting in him pursuing a career in arts administration. Initially, he focused on the classical music sector, working at two leading concert venues in London, the Wigmore Hall and the Southbank Centre.

In 1992, he made his first move into theatre following his appointment as administrative director of West Yorkshire Playhouse in Leeds, alongside Jude Kelly where he produced a number of plays including the touring production of Five Guys Named Moe for Cameron Mackintosh Limited. In 1996, he was appointed Head of Planning of the Royal National Theatre under the outgoing artistic director, Sir Richard Eyre and subsequently with Sir Trevor Nunn and Sir Nicholas Hytner. In 2009, he became the National Theatre's Associate Producer. During this period, he produced numerous productions for tour both in the UK and internationally, taking the work of the National Theatre to five continents. Alongside this, he has worked as a touring consultant for the Abbey Theatre in Dublin, the Royal Court Theatre, London, Fiery Angel in London's West End, Canadian Stage in Toronto, Bangarra Dance Theatre in Sydney, TheEmergencyRoom and Corn Exchange in Dublin and Galway International Arts Festival. In June 2016, he was appointed Executive Producer of Wales Millennium Centre in Cardiff. In addition to this, he is Consultant Producer to the National Centre for the Performing Arts (India) in Mumbai.

As well as his theatre producing work, Cusack offers representation to a number of Irish artists including the director Annie Ryan, the composer Mel Mercier and the British playwright Matt Wilkinson.

In 2023, Cusack was the recipient of the Olwen Wymark Award from the Writers' Guild of Great Britain for his championing of new writing which was presented at the 18th Annual Awards Ceremony in London.

Michael Sheen launched his own theatre company, Welsh National Theatre, in January 2025 and in April, Cusack was announced as Executive Producer for the company's inaugural productions, Our Town by Thornton Wilder, a co-production with the Rose Theatre in Kingston, winning the UK Theatre Award 2026 for Best Revival, and Owain & Henry by Gary Owen, a co-production with Wales Millennium Centre.

In October 2025, the National Theatre announced that Cusack will be returning as Consultant Touring Producer in January 2026, leading up the National's producing team alongside Tim Levy and Christine Gettins.

== Selected dramatography - international touring ==
Productions
Year	Play	Director	Leading Actors	Notes
1995	The Servant of Two Masters by Carlo Goldoni adapted by Improbable Theatre	Phelim McDermott	Toby Jones	Leeds & Venice
2002	The PowerBook by Jeanette Winterson	Deborah Warner	Fiona Shaw, Saffron Burrows	London, Paris, Rome
2005	Primo by Primo Levi	Richard Wilson	Antony Sher	London, Cape Town, New York
2005–2007	Happy Days by Samuel Beckett	Deborah Warner	Fiona Shaw	London, Dublin, Paris, Amsterdam, Madrid, Epidaurus, Washington DC & New York
2006–2008	The History Boys by Alan Bennett	Nicholas Hytner	Richard Griffiths, Dominic Cooper, Frances de la Tour	London, UK Tour, Dublin, Hong Kong, Sydney, Wellington & New York
2007	Waves - a work devised by Katie Mitchell and the company from the text of Virginia Woolf's novel, The Waves	Katie Mitchell	Anastasia Hille, Kate Duchêne	London, UK Tour, Amsterdam, Luxembourg & New York
2009	Phèdre by Jean Racine in a translation by Ted Hughes	Nicholas Hytner	Helen Mirren, Ruth Negga	London, Epidaurus & Washington DC
2009-10	The Cat in the Hat by Dr. Seuss in an adaptation by Katie Mitchell	Katie Mitchell	Angus Wright	London & Paris
2012–2013	One Man, Two Guvnors by Carlo Goldoni adapted by Richard Bean	Nicholas Hytner	James Corden/Owain Arthur	London, UK Tour, Hong Kong, Adelaide, Sydney, Melbourne & Auckland
2014–2015	Not I, Footfalls & Rockaby by Samuel Beckett	Walter Asmus	Lisa Dwan	London, Galway, UK Tour, Hong Kong, Perth & New York
2014–2016	riverun adapted by Olwen Fouéré from Finnegans Wake by James Joyce	Olwen Fouéré	Olwen Fouéré	Galway, Dublin, London, Edinburgh, Adelaide, Sydney, Princeton, New York & Washington DC
2015–2016	A Girl Is a Half-formed Thing by Eimear McBride adapted by Annie Ryan	Annie Ryan	Aoife Duffin	Dublin, Edinburgh, London, UK Tour & New York
2017	Tiger Bay the Musical by Daf James and Michael Williams	Melly Still	John Owen-Jones & Noel Sullivan	Cardiff, Wales & Cape Town, South Africa
2018	Long Day's Journey into Night by Eugene O'Neill	Richard Eyre	Jeremy Irons & Lesley Manville	New York & Los Angeles
2020	The Mirror Crack'd by Agatha Christie, adapted for the stage by Rachel Wagstaff, reimagined by Ayeesha Menon	Melly Still	Sonali Kulkarni, Shernaz Patel & Denzil Smith	Mumbai, India
2022	Psychodrama by Matt Wilkinson	Matt Wilkinson	Emily Bruni	TravFest22, Edinburgh
2024	Nye by Tim Price	Rufus Norris	Michael Sheen, Sharon Small	London, Cardiff & NT Live
2025	Our Town by Thornton Wilder	Francesca Goodridge	Michael Sheen	Welsh National Theatre, Welsh Tour, London
