= Max Irons =

British actor (born 1985)

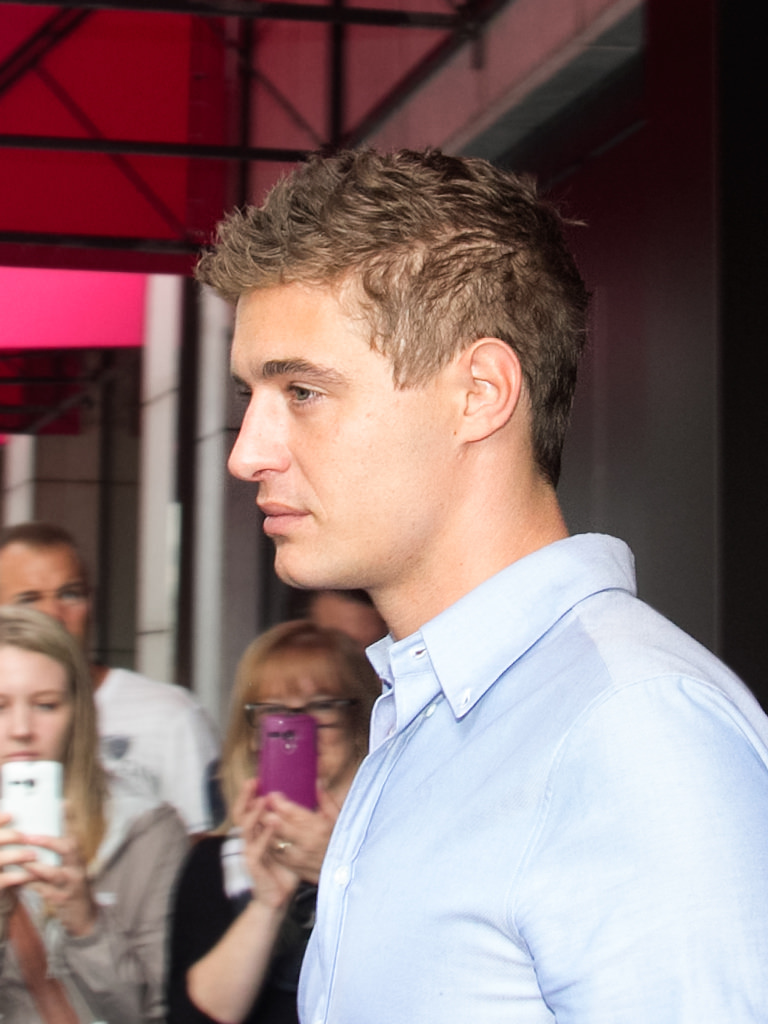
- Irons in 2014
- Born: Maximilian Paul Diarmuid Irons; 17 October 1985 (age 41); London, England
- Citizenship: United Kingdom; Ireland
- Education: Guildhall School of Music and Drama
- Occupations: Actor; model
- Years active: 2004–present
- Spouse: Sophie Pera (m. 2019)
- Children: 1
- Parents: Jeremy Irons (father); Sinéad Cusack (mother)
- Relatives: Cyril Cusack (grandfather); Richard Boyd Barrett (half-brother); Sorcha Cusack (aunt); Niamh Cusack (aunt); Catherine Cusack (aunt); Pádraig Cusack (uncle); Calam Lynch (cousin)

Maximilian Paul Diarmuid Irons (born 17 October 1985) is an English actor. Following a bit part in the 2004 film Being Julia, he has gone on to major roles in films such as Red Riding Hood (2011), The Host (2013), Bitter Harvest (2017), and The Wife (2018). On television, he has had lead roles in The White Queen (2013) and Condor (2018–2020).

== Early life ==
Maximilian Paul Diarmuid Irons was born in the London Borough of Camden on 17 October 1985, the son of Irish actress Sinéad Cusack and English actor Jeremy Irons. He has an older brother, Samuel Irons, who is a photographer. Their mother's family was deeply involved with theatre: they are the grandsons of actors Cyril Cusack and Maureen Cusack. Through his mother, Irons is a half-brother of politician Richard Boyd Barrett; his aunts are the actresses Niamh Cusack and Sorcha Cusack, and his uncle is theatre producer Pádraig Cusack.

Irons attended the Dragon School in Oxford, and Bryanston School in Dorset, before finishing at the Guildhall School of Music and Drama, where he graduated in 2008. He was dyslexic and struggled in school, as the teaching methods did not suit his learning style. His father discouraged him from going into an acting career. While first starting off in acting, Irons worked as a barman.

== Career ==
=== Acting ===
In 2011, Irons played Henry in Catherine Hardwicke's Red Riding Hood. He was chosen to play Jared Howe in the 2013 film adaptation of The Host, based on Stephenie Meyer's science fiction novel of the same name.

In the 2013 television series The White Queen, Irons took the leading role of Edward IV of England. The series, based on Philippa Gregory's best-selling historical novel series The Cousins' War, was broadcast weekly on BBC One, ending on 18 August 2013. Irons appeared in The Riot Club (2014), the film adaptation of the play Posh. In 2016, he starred in the ITV miniseries Tutankhamun as archeologist Howard Carter. In April 2017, producers announced Irons had been cast to play Joe Turner, the role created by Robert Redford in Three Days of the Condor (1975), in a television series based on the movie. He also joined Lifetime's movie adaptation of Flowers in the Attic.

That year he starred in the film Crooked House (2017), based on a 1949 novel by Agatha Christie of the same name. Terence Stamp, Glenn Close, Gillian Anderson, and Stefanie Martini also are among the large cast in the film.

=== Modelling ===
Irons has modelled for companies including Burberry and Mango. As of 2012, he was on a modelling contract for Macy's I.N.C. collection for Fall/Winter 2012. In 2015, he was named one of GQ's 50 best-dressed British men.

== Personal life ==
In 2013, Irons began dating Tatler fashion director Sophie Pera. They were married in Oxfordshire on 30 November 2019. The couple had a daughter in 2023.

== Filmography ==
Key
†	Denotes projects that have not yet been released

=== Film ===
Year	Title	Role	Notes	Ref.
2004	Being Julia	Curtain Call Boy		
2009	Dorian Gray	Lucius		
2011	Red Riding Hood	Henry Lazar		
2013	The Host	Jared Howe		
2014	The Riot Club	Miles 'Milo' Richards		
2015	Woman in Gold	Fredrick "Fritz" Altmann		
2017	Bitter Harvest	Yuri		
2017	The Wife	David Castleman		
2017	Crooked House	Charles Hayward		
2018	Terminal	Alfred		

=== Television ===
Year	Title	Role	Notes	Ref.
2011	The Runaway	Tommy Pasqualino	Miniseries; 3 episodes	
2013	The White Queen	Edward IV of England	Miniseries; 9 episodes	
2016	Tutankhamun	Howard Carter	Miniseries; 4 episodes	
2018	The Little Drummer Girl	Al	Miniseries; 2 episodes	
2018–2020	Condor	Joe Turner	Series regular; 20 episodes	
2022	Flowers in the Attic: The Origin	Malcolm Foxworth	Miniseries; 4 episodes	
2025	Miss Austen	Henry Hobday	Miniseries; 4 episodes	
2026	Young Sherlock	Mycroft Holmes	Series regular; 7 episodes	
2027	Neuromancer †	Jean Tessier-Ashpool	Post-production	
