= London Wall (play) =

London Wall is a play by the British writer John Van Druten that was first staged in 1931. It based on the romantic entanglements of the staff at a firm of British solicitors in London. It premiered in May 1931 and ran for 170 performances at the Duke of York's Theatre in the West End. The play remained largely forgotten until it was rediscovered by the Finborough Theatre with a production in 2013 and a subsequent West End adaptation at the St James Theatre. In 2014 the play received its American premiere when it was staged by Mint Theater Company in New York City; this production was filmed and later broadcast as part of the WNET Off-Broadway Series, Theater Close Up.

== Film adaptation ==
The play served as the basis for the 1932 British film After Office Hours, directed by Thomas Bentley. The film features several actors who appeared in the original stage production, including Frank Lawton and Heather Angel.

A second screen adaptation was filmed in 2014 by British company Master Media that was directed by Jennifer Darling. This version also features several cast members from the 2013 stage revival, including Alix Dunmore, Alex Robertson and Marty Cruickshank, as well as Jon Glover and newcomers Susanna Jennings and James G. Nunn.

== Bibliography ==
- Kershaw, Baz (ed.). The Cambridge History of British Theatre, Volume 3. Cambridge University Press, 2004.
