= Sinéad Cusack =

Irish stage, television and film actress

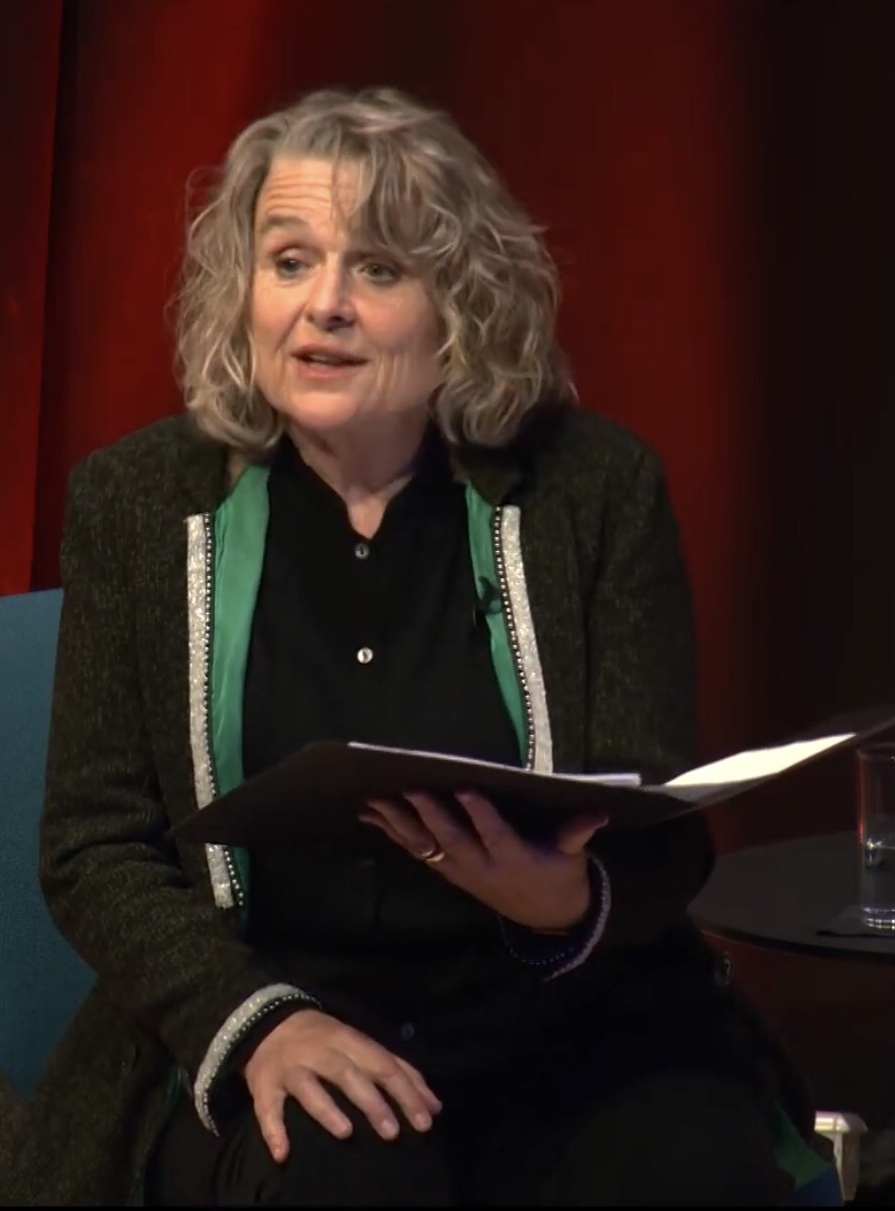
- Cusack performing poetry in 2021
- Born: Jane Moira Cusack; 18 February 1948 (age 78); Dalkey, Dublin, Ireland
- Occupation: Actress
- Years active: 1967–present
- Spouse: Jeremy Irons (m. 1978)
- Children: 3, including Max Irons and Richard Boyd Barrett
- Parents: Cyril Cusack; Maureen Cusack
- Relatives: Sorcha Cusack (sister); Niamh Cusack (sister); Pádraig Cusack (brother); Catherine Cusack (paternal half-sister); Calam Lynch (nephew)

Jane Moira "Sinéad" Cusack (/ʃɪˈneɪd/ shin-AYD; born 18 February 1948) is an Irish actress. Her first acting roles were at the Abbey Theatre in Dublin, before moving to London in 1969 to join the Royal Shakespeare Company. She has won the Critics' Circle and Evening Standard Awards for her performance in Sebastian Barry's Our Lady of Sligo.

Cusack has received two Tony Award nominations: once for Best Leading Actress in Much Ado About Nothing (1985), and again for Best Featured Actress in Rock 'n' Roll (2008). She has also received five Olivier Award nominations for As You Like (1981), The Maid's Tragedy (also 1981), The Taming of the Shrew (1983), Our Lady of Sligo (1998) and Rock 'n' Roll (2007). In 2020, she was listed at number 25 on The Irish Times' list of Ireland's greatest film actors.

== Early life ==
Cusack was born Jane Moira Cusack in Dalkey, County Dublin, the daughter of actress Maureen Cusack (born Mary Margaret Kiely) and actor Cyril Cusack. She is the sister of actresses Sorcha Cusack, Niamh Cusack, and half-sister to Catherine Cusack. Her father was born in South Africa, to an Irish father and an English mother, and had worked with Micheál Mac Liammóir at Dublin's Gate Theatre.

== Career ==
=== Theatre ===
Her first acting roles were at the Abbey Theatre in Dublin. In 1975, she moved to London and joined the Royal Shakespeare Company (RSC), starring in Dion Boucicault's London Assurance in the West End. Cusack's work with the RSC continued with an award-winning performance as Celia in As You Like It which included the Clarence Derwent Award and her first Olivier Award nomination. She secured a second Olivier Award nomination for her performance in The Maid's Tragedy by Francis Beaumont and John Fletcher in 1981, followed two years later with a third Olivier Award nomination as Kate in The Taming of the Shrew.

She made her Broadway debut in 1984, performing in repertory with the Royal Shakespeare Company. Starring opposite Derek Jacobi, she played Roxane in Anthony Burgess' translation of Edmond Rostand's Cyrano de Bergerac and Beatrice in William Shakespeare's Much Ado About Nothing, directed by Terry Hands. Much Ado was first produced at the Royal Shakespeare Theatre in Stratford-upon-Avon in 1982–83, then moved to London's Barbican Theatre for the 1983–1984 season where it was joined by Cyrano, before both plays transferred to New York's Gershwin Theatre from October 1984 to January 1985, for which Cusack received a Tony Award nomination for her performance as Beatrice, and costar Derek Jacobi won the award for his Benedick. The production of Cyrano de Bergerac was later filmed in 1985.

During this period, Cusack and her husband, Jeremy Irons, appeared in a Shakespeare Winter's Eve, a major fundraiser for the Riverside Shakespeare Company in New York, along with other members of the Royal Shakespeare Company. Following the Broadway run, the plays toured the US, making stops in Washington, D.C. and Los Angeles. Cusack's connection with the Royal Shakespeare Company continued with a series of leading roles include Portia in The Merchant of Venice opposite David Suchet, Lady Macbeth opposite Jonathan Pryce in Macbeth and Cleopatra in Antony and Cleopatra in Stratford-upon-Avon and at London's Haymarket Theatre in the West End.

In 1990, Cusack, in the role of Masha, joined two of her sisters, Niamh (as Irina) and Sorcha (as Olga), and her father, Cyril Cusack (as Chebutykin) for a well-received production of Anton Chekhov's tragi-comedy The Three Sisters in a new version by Frank McGuinness, directed by Adrian Noble at the Gate Theatre, Dublin before transferring to the Royal Court Theatre in London. The production also featured Niamh's husband Finbar Lynch as Solenyi and Lesley Manville as Natasha. The production won the three real-life sisters the Irish Life Award in 1992.

One of her best-known stage roles was Our Lady of Sligo by Sebastian Barry in 1998, in which she played the principal role of Mai O'Hara in performances in Ireland, on Broadway and at the National Theatre. For this, she won the 1998 Evening Standard Theatre Awards for Best Actress, the 1998 Critics' Circle Theatre Award for Best Actress and her fourth Olivier Award nomination for Best Actress. In 2006/7, she starred with Rufus Sewell in Tom Stoppard's Rock 'n' Roll at the Royal Court Theatre in London which transferred to the West End and Broadway, winning Cusack her fifth Olivier Award nomination and her second Tony Award nomination.

In 2015, Cusack returned to Ireland's Abbey Theatre, where she began her theatre career. She appeared in the world première of Mark O'Rowe's play Our Few And Evil Days, acting opposite long-time collaborator Ciarán Hinds. She won the Irish Times Theatre Award for Best Actress.

=== Film and television ===
Cusack starred with Peter Sellers in the film Hoffman (1970). She guest-starred in an episode of The Persuaders! (1971), a TV series starring Tony Curtis and Roger Moore, as Jenny Lindley, a wealthy heiress who suspects that a man claiming to be her dead brother is in fact an impostor. In 1975, she made three appearances in the TV series Quiller as the character Rosalind. The following year she was featured in the title role of George du Maurier's Trilby (1976), in an adaptation for the BBC's Play of the Month, with Alan Badel as Svengali.

Cusack and her husband Jeremy Irons appeared together in the film Waterland (1992), in a television adaptation of Christopher Hampton's Tales from Hollywood (also 1992), and again in Bernardo Bertolucci's Stealing Beauty (1996). Further film work includes Passion of Mind (2000), V for Vendetta (2005), and Eastern Promises (2007), a thriller directed by David Cronenberg. Her performance in The Tiger's Tail (also 2007) won her a first IFTA Award nomination for Best Actress in a Supporting Role. She won the IFTA Award for her performance in The Sea (2013), adapted from the novel by John Banville. Cusack was nominated once more for an IFTA Award for her performance in John Boorman's drama film Queen and Country (2014), which premièred at the Cannes Film Festival.

Further starring roles in productions for the BBC include lead roles in Frank McGuinness's The Hen House (1989), the five-part series Oliver's Travels alongside Alan Bates (1995), and the miniseries Have Your Cake and Eat It (1997), for which she won the RTS Award for Best Actress. In 2004, Cusack played Mrs. Thornton in North and South, an adaptation of the 1855 novel by Elizabeth Gaskell into a miniseries. She also appeared in a BBC sitcom called Home Again (2006). In 2011, the historical fantasy series Camelot was broadcast on Starz, in which she played the motherly nun Sibyl, who gets beheaded in the first season's 10th and final episode. Cusack had featured roles in the mini-series The Deep (2014) and in the first season of the crime noir Marcella (2016).

== Publications ==
Along with other actresses, including Paola Dionisotti, Fiona Shaw, Juliet Stevenson and Harriet Walter, Cusack contributed to a book by Carol Rutter called Clamorous Voices: Shakespeare's Women Today (1994). The book analysed modern acting interpretations of female Shakespearean roles.

== Personal life ==
Cusack married British actor Jeremy Irons in 1978, and they have two sons, Samuel James and Maximilian Paul.

Before marrying Irons, Cusack gave birth to a son in 1967 and placed the boy for adoption. In 2007, a journalist for the Irish Sunday Independent, Daniel McConnell, revealed that Cusack was the mother of left-wing general election candidate and now member of Dáil Éireann, Richard Boyd Barrett. The two have since been reunited. Cusack campaigned for Boyd Barrett when he stood unsuccessfully in Ireland's 2007 general election as the People Before Profit Alliance's candidate for Dún Laoghaire constituency. She also joined him in the count centre as he awaited the outcome of the 2011 general election, at which he was elected to Dáil Éireann. In May 2013, Boyd Barrett revealed that theatre director Vincent Dowling was his biological father.

Cusack had a short relationship with the footballer George Best in 1971. While married to Irons, she had a long relationship with playwright Tom Stoppard but made it clear that she wanted to remain married to her husband. After her reunion with Boyd Barrett, she also wanted to spend time with him in Dublin rather than with Stoppard in France, where they shared a house.

Cusack is a patron of the Burma Campaign UK, the London-based group campaigning for human rights and democracy in Burma.

In 1998, Cusack was named, along with her husband, in a list of the biggest private financial donors to the British Labour Party. In August 2010, Cusack signed the "Irish artists' pledge to boycott Israel" initiated by the Ireland Palestine Solidarity Campaign.

== Filmography ==
- Jules Verne's Rocket to the Moon (1967) as Vera (uncredited)
- Alfred the Great (1969) as Edith
- David Copperfield (US, 1970, TV Movie) as Emily
- Hoffman (1970) as Miss Smith
- The Rise and Rise of Michael Rimmer (1970) as Yvonne (uncredited)
- Tam Lin (1970) as Rose
- Revenge (1971) as Rose
- The Persuaders! (1971, TV Series) 1 episode – 'Take Seven' ... as Jenny Linder
- The Protectors (1973 British TV Series) 1 episode – 'Burning Bush' S2 Ep18 as Anne Ferris
- A Likely Story (1973) as Liz
- Thriller (1973, TV Series) 1 episode – 'The Eyes Have It' ... as Sally
- Notorious Woman (1974, TV Mini-Series) as Marie Dorval
- Love's Labour's Lost (1975, TV Series) as Rosaline
- Trilby (1976, TV Series) as Trilby
- The Last Remake of Beau Geste (1977) as Isabel Geste
- Ghost of Venice (1977, TV Series) as Leonora
- The Black Night (1977, TV Series) as Ermine
- Twelfth Night (1980, TV Movie) as Olivia
- Cyrano de Bergerac (1985, TV Movie) as Roxane
- Dublin Murders (1985)
- Rocket Gibraltar (1988) as Amanda 'Billi' Rockwell
- Venus Peter (1989) as Miss Balsilbie
- Waterland (1992) as Mary Crick
- Bad Behaviour (1993) as Ellie McAllister
- The Cement Garden (1993) as Mother
- Sparrow (1993) as Matilde
- Uncovered (1994) as Menchu
- Oliver's Travels (1995, TV Mini-Series) as WPC Diane Priest
- Stealing Beauty (1996) as Diana
- Have Your Cake and Eat It (1997, TV Mini-Series) as Charlotte Dawson
- The Nephew (1998) as Brenda O'Boyce
- Passion of Mind (2000) as Jessie
- My Mother Frank (2000) as Frances (Frank) Kennedy
- Dream (2001) as Kathleen
- I Capture the Castle (2003) as Mrs. Cotton
- North and South (2004, TV Series) as Hannah Thornton
- Mathilde (2004) as Wife of Col. De Petris
- Dad (2005, TV Movie) as Sandy James
- V for Vendetta (2006) as Delia Surridge
- The Tiger's Tail (2006) as Oona O'Leary
- Eastern Promises (2007) as Helen
- A Room with a View (2007, TV Movie) as Miss Lavish
- Cracks (2009) as Miss Nieven
- Camelot (2011, TV Series) as Sybil
- Wrath of the Titans (2012) as Clea
- Midsomer Murders (2013, TV Series) "Death and The Divas" as Stella Harris
- The Sea (2013, IFTA Best Supporting Actress Award) as Anna Morden
- Agatha Christie's Poirot (2013, Episode: "Dead Man's Folly") as Mrs. Amy Folliat
- 37 Days (2014, TV Mini-Series) as Margot Asquith
- Queen and Country (2014) as Grace Rohan
- Stonehearst Asylum (2014) as Mrs. Pike
- Jekyll and Hyde (2015, TV Mini-Series) as Maggie Hope
- Marcella (2016, TV Series) as Sylvie Gibson
- Call the Midwife (2016, TV series: Season 5, Christmas Special) as Dr. Myra Fitzsimmonds
- National Theatre Live: King Lear (2018) as Kent
- Napoleon (2023) as Letizia Bonaparte

== Awards and nominations ==
Awards and nominations
Year	Award	Work	Category
1981	Clarence Derwent Award for Best Supporting Actress	As You Like It	Won
1981	Olivier Award for Best Actress in a Supporting Role	As You Like It	Nominated
1981	Olivier Award for Best Actress in a Revival	The Maid's Tragedy	Nominated
1983	Olivier Award for Best Actress in a Revival	The Taming of the Shrew	Nominated
1985	Tony Award for Best Actress in a Play	Much Ado About Nothing	Nominated
1998	RTS Television Award for Best Actor – Female	Have You Cake And Eat It	Won
1998	Evening Standard Award for Best Actress	Our Lady of Sligo	Won
1999	Critics' Circle Award for Best Actress	Our Lady of Sligo	Won
1999	Olivier Award for Best Actress in a Play	Our Lady of Sligo	Nominated
2007	Olivier Award for Best Actress in a Play	Rock 'n' Roll	Nominated
2007	Tony Award for Best Actress in a Play	Rock 'n' Roll	Nominated
2007	IFTA Award for Best Actress in a Supporting Role – Film	The Tiger's Tail	Nominated
2014	IFTA Award for Best Actress in a Supporting Role – Film	The Sea	Won
2015	IFTA Award for Best Actress in a Supporting Role – Film	Queen and Country	Nominated
2015	Irish Times Theatre Awards for Best Actress	Our Few And Evil Days	Won
