= After Office Hours (1932 film) =

1932 British film by Thomas Bentley

- Directed by: Thomas Bentley
- Written by: Thomas Bentley; Frank Launder
- Based on: London Wall; 1931 play by John Van Druten
- Starring: Frank Lawton; Heather Angel; Viola Lyel; Garry Marsh
- Cinematography: Ernest Palmer
- Edited by: John Neill Brown
- Music by: John Greenwood
- Production company: British International Pictures
- Distributed by: Wardour Films
- Release dates: 30 June 1932 (London); 24 October 1932 (United Kingdom)
- Running time: 78 minutes
- Country: United Kingdom
- Language: English

After Office Hours is a 1932 British romantic drama film directed by Thomas Bentley and starring Frank Lawton, Viola Lyel and Garry Marsh.

The film was based on the 1931 play London Wall by John Van Druten with several of the cast reprising their roles from the original stage production. The film was produced by the British film studio British International Pictures at their Elstree Studios.

== Plot ==
Office romance, in which Hec is in love with secretary Pat, and fellow secretary Miss Janus, older and wiser, takes it upon herself to concoct a plan to help him receive the empty-headed Pat's affections.

== Cast ==
- Frank Lawton as Hec
- Heather Angel as Pat
- Viola Lyel as Miss Janus
- Garry Marsh as Brewer
- Eileen Peel as Miss Bufton
- Frank Royde as Mr. Walker
- Katie Johnson as Miss Wilesden
- Nadine March as Miss Hooper
