= Pommy (play) =

Play written by W. P. Lipscomb and John Watson

- Written by: W. P. Lipscomb; John Watson
- Original language: English
- Genre: melodrama
- Setting: rural Queensland

Premiere
- Date premiered: 1950

Pommy is a play written by W. P. Lipscomb and John Watson in the late 1940s.

== Plot ==
An Englishman arrives in Australia and works on a station.

== Production ==
The story was originally written by Watson as a script and sent to Rank. He met Lipscomb, who had never been to Australia in 1948 and the two decided to collaborate. Lipscomb later went to Australia to write Bitter Springs.

Peter Finch was originally attached as director for its original English production but eventually pulled out. The cast included Bill Kerr and Ronald Howard and the production ran for six weeks touring through England. It did not come to London.

Despite the play's success in England, author John Watson said there was a reluctance from Australian theatre managements to put on the play in Australia. It was eventually produced in Sydney and Melbourne in 1954.
