= Richard Boyd Barrett =

Irish politician (born 1967)

Richard Boyd Barrett TD
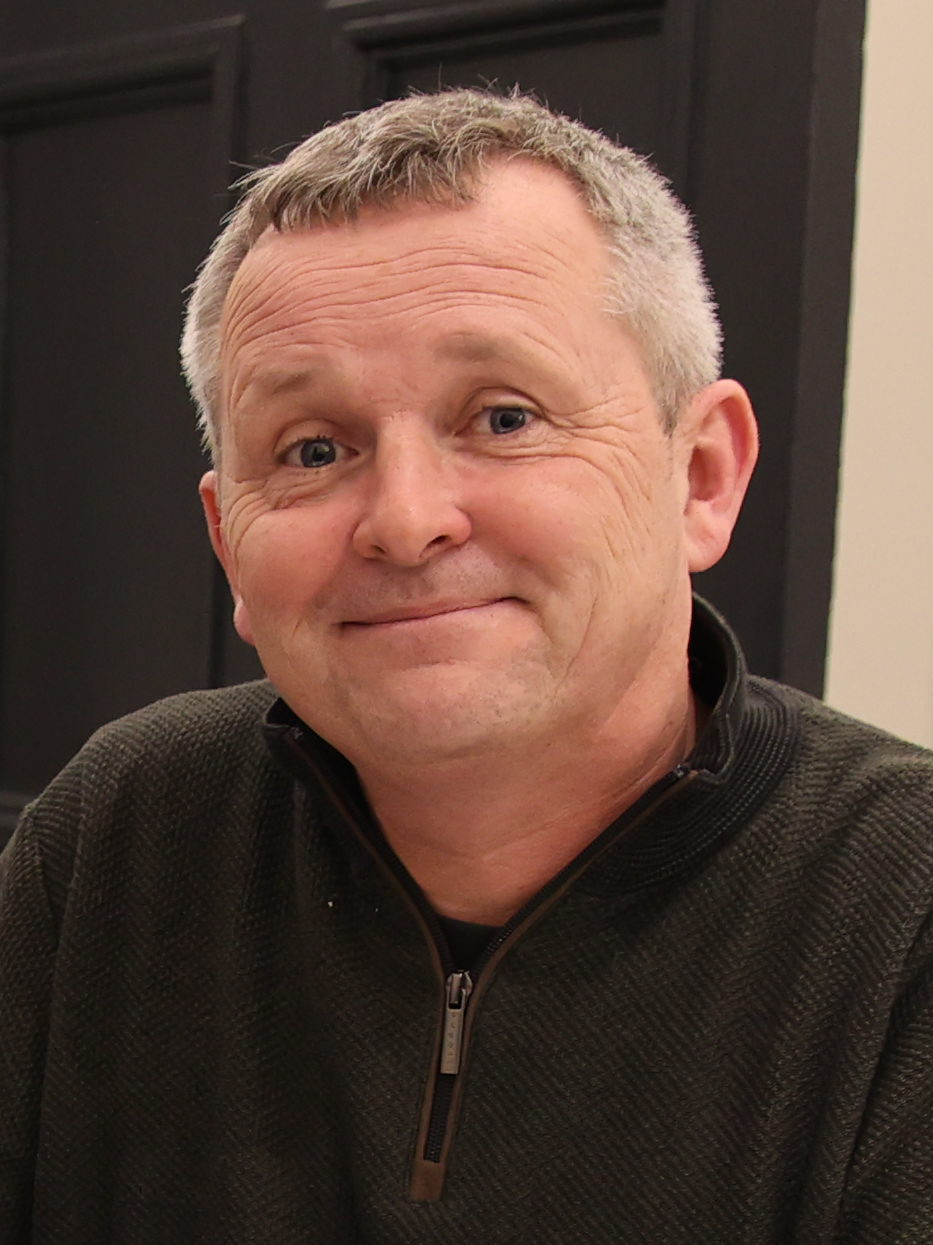
- Boyd Barrett in 2024

Leader of People Before Profit
- Incumbent
- Assumed office 10 October 2024
- Preceded by: Position established

Teachta Dála
- Incumbent
- Assumed office February 2011
- Constituency: Dún Laoghaire

Personal details
- Born: 6 February 1967 (age 59) Dublin, Ireland
- Party: People Before Profit (since 2007)
- Other political affiliations: People Before Profit–Solidarity; United Left Alliance (2011); Socialist Workers Network
- Parents: Biological: Vincent Dowling; Sinéad Cusack
- Relatives: Sorcha Cusack (aunt); Niamh Cusack (aunt); Catherine Cusack (aunt); Pádraig Cusack (uncle); Cyril Cusack (grandfather); Maureen Cusack (grandmother)
- Education: University College Dublin
- Website: richardboydbarrett.ie

Richard Boyd Barrett (born 6 February 1967) is an Irish People Before Profit–Solidarity politician who has been a Teachta Dála (TD) for the Dún Laoghaire constituency since the 2011 general election. Boyd Barrett was previously a member of Dún Laoghaire–Rathdown County Council. He is also chair of the Irish Anti-War Movement, and has been cited on war issues in the Irish media.

== Family and personal life ==
Richard Boyd Barrett was adopted as a baby. He was raised as a Catholic in Glenageary, County Dublin, by David Boyd Barrett, an accountant, and his wife, Valerie. He attended St Michael's College in Dublin. He holds a master's degree in English literature from University College Dublin, where he played for the university's football team UCD AFC in the Leinster Junior League. He also played junior tennis at a national level as a youth.

His birth mother is Sinéad Cusack, with whom he was later reunited in public. The Cusack–Boyd Barrett connection was revealed to the public in the last week of Boyd Barrett's unsuccessful attempt to be elected to the Dáil at the 2007 general election; Cusack, a vocal opponent of the Iraq War, canvassed for him. Political commentators incorrectly claimed that Boyd Barrett had leaked his connection with Cusack for political gains; it was actually a meeting of Sunday Independent journalist Liam Collins and the same newspaper's security correspondent Jim Cusack that led to its publication. While both were dining out in Dún Laoghaire, the security correspondent mentioned to Collins: "I heard Sinéad Cusack is his mother." Collins had political reporter Daniel McConnell call Boyd Barrett to ask him. Boyd Barrett asked that it not be published as it was private family information that had nothing to do with his role as a public representative. Since their reunion, Boyd Barrett has had a good relationship with Cusack, her husband Jeremy Irons, and his half-brothers, Sam and Max. In May 2013, he revealed that theatre director Vincent Dowling was his biological father.

== Political career ==
=== Local politics ===
Boyd Barrett contested the 2004 Dún Laoghaire–Rathdown County Council election. He was not elected and received 1,439 votes (7.4% of the poll). At the 2009 election, he was elected to Dún Laoghaire–Rathdown County Council, topping the poll in the Dún Laoghaire LEA with 22.8% of the vote.

=== National politics ===
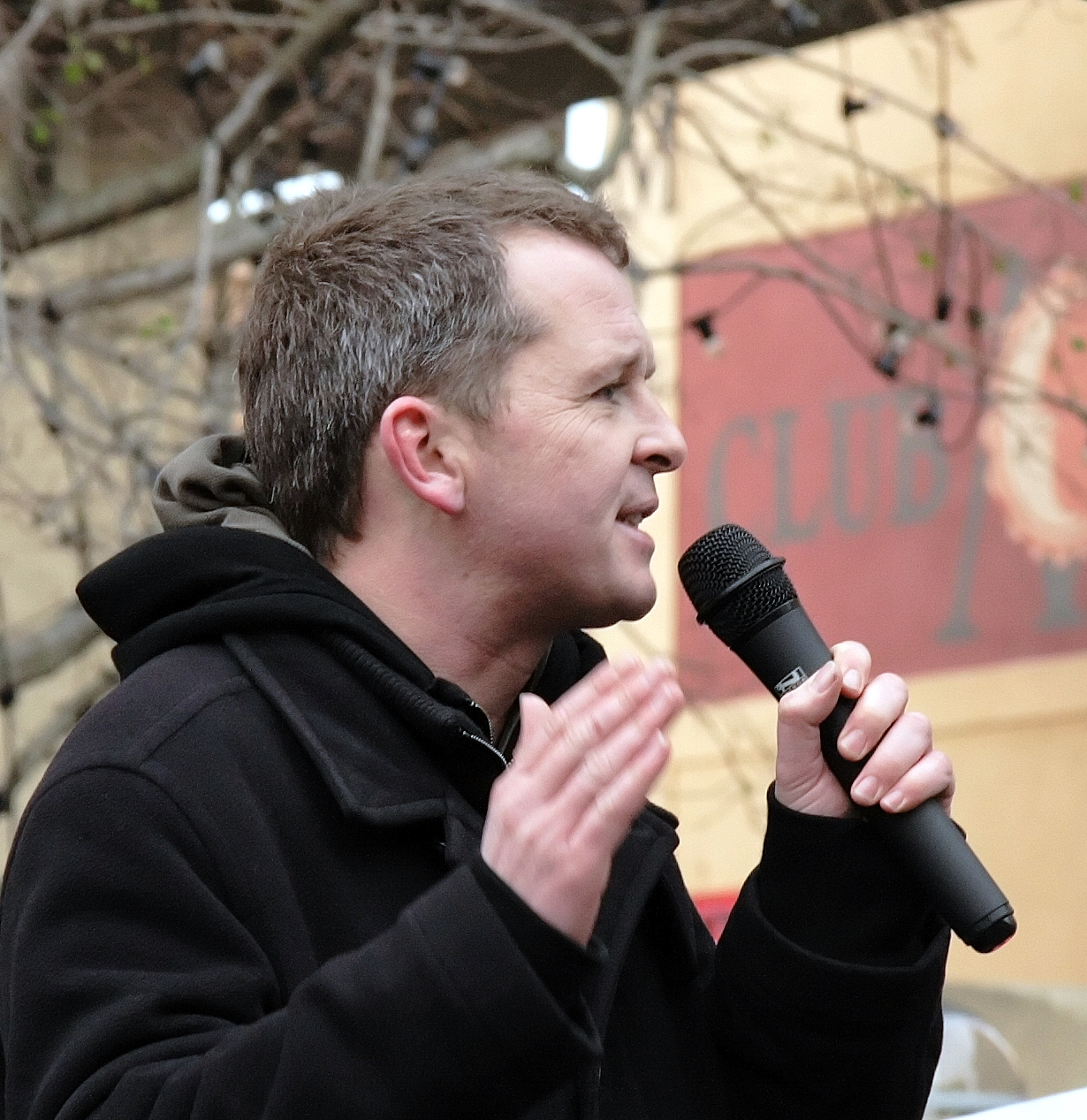
Boyd Barrett at a protest in 2009

Boyd Barrett stood in the Dún Laoghaire constituency at the 2002 general election for the Socialist Workers Party, and at the 2007 general election for the People Before Profit. This switch of identification was intended to increase his support from non-socialist voters. In the run-up to the election in 2007 he participated in high-profile campaigns against high-rise development, bin and water charges, privatisation of hospitals and support for the Rossport Five. Boyd Barrett lost to Ciarán Cuffe of the Green Party, by 9,910 votes to 7,890 votes on the 10th count.

At the 2011 general election, Boyd Barrett was elected as a TD for Dún Laoghaire for People Before Profit. PBP was part of the United Left Alliance. Following a "nail-biting two days" of recounting votes, was elected on the 10th count without reaching the quota.

=== Dáil Éireann ===
As a TD, Boyd Barrett, supported protests against cuts to Dublin Bus services, saying that "Some of the older and disabled people are literally prisoners in their homes now as a result of the cut or discontinuation of the service they previously relied on". In the Dáil, he condemned the 2011 murder of PSNI officer Ronan Kerr as "an utterly brutal action, which leads back down a road which has failed". He drafted the text of the first Private Members' motion which suggests there is an "overwhelming democratic case" for putting the EU–IMF bank bailout to a referendum of the Irish people. He also committed to facilitating the nomination of Senator David Norris, for a place on the ballot paper ahead of the 2011 presidential election, and welcomed the release of Teresa Treacy, who was imprisoned for contempt of court over a land development dispute with the ESB and Eirgrid. Marie O'Halloran in The Irish Times described his "consistently passionate outrage and opposition to the Government's handling of the financial and banking crisis."

Boyd Barrett spoke in a Dublin location at the 15 October 2011 global protests, inspired by the Spanish "Indignants" and the Occupy Wall Street movements. The same month he said Enda Kenny's government was engaging in "spin and disingenuity" to cover up its austerity policies, decrying the closure of hospital emergency departments around the country for "health and safety" reasons. On 2 November 2011, Boyd Barrett led the United Left Alliance TDs out of the Dáil, in protest against the government's decision not to hold a debate on the payment of more than €700 million to Anglo Irish Bank bondholders. "You will not even give the parliament the right to vote on the handover of all the money you have taken out of the health service", he objected. On 15 December 2011, he helped launch a nationwide campaign against a proposed household charge being brought in as part of the 2012 Irish budget.

The Phoenix reported that after a Technical group meeting with the Troika on 17 January 2012, another member of the Technical Group, Mick Wallace, confronted Boyd Barrett and angrily criticized him for "ignoring their advance strategy of dividing up questions between them and dominating the meeting with a raft of his own queries and assertions. Boyd Barrett was part of an Oireachtas delegation that met the Bundestag's Budgetary and European Affairs committees in Berlin, in late January 2012. In October 2012, he confirmed that he had claimed €12,000 in 2011 expenses for travelling to the Dáil from his home in Glenageary, in his Dún Laoghaire constituency – a distance of 12 km. On 10 March 2016, at the first sitting of the 32nd Dáil, he was one of four candidates nominated for the position of Taoiseach, all of whom failed to reach a majority. Ruth Coppinger nominated Boyd Barrett for the role, quoting James Connolly from a hundred years previously when she said: "The day has passed for patching up the capitalist system. It must go" and declaring: "We will not vote for the identical twin candidates" of Fine Gael and Fianna Fáil, after they "imposed austerity". Bríd Smith seconded the nomination. The nomination of Boyd Barrett was defeated by 9 votes to 111. As well as the 6 other AAA–PBP TDs, he had the support of Séamus Healy of the Workers and Unemployed Action, Tommy Broughan of Independents 4 Change, and Independent TD Catherine Connolly.

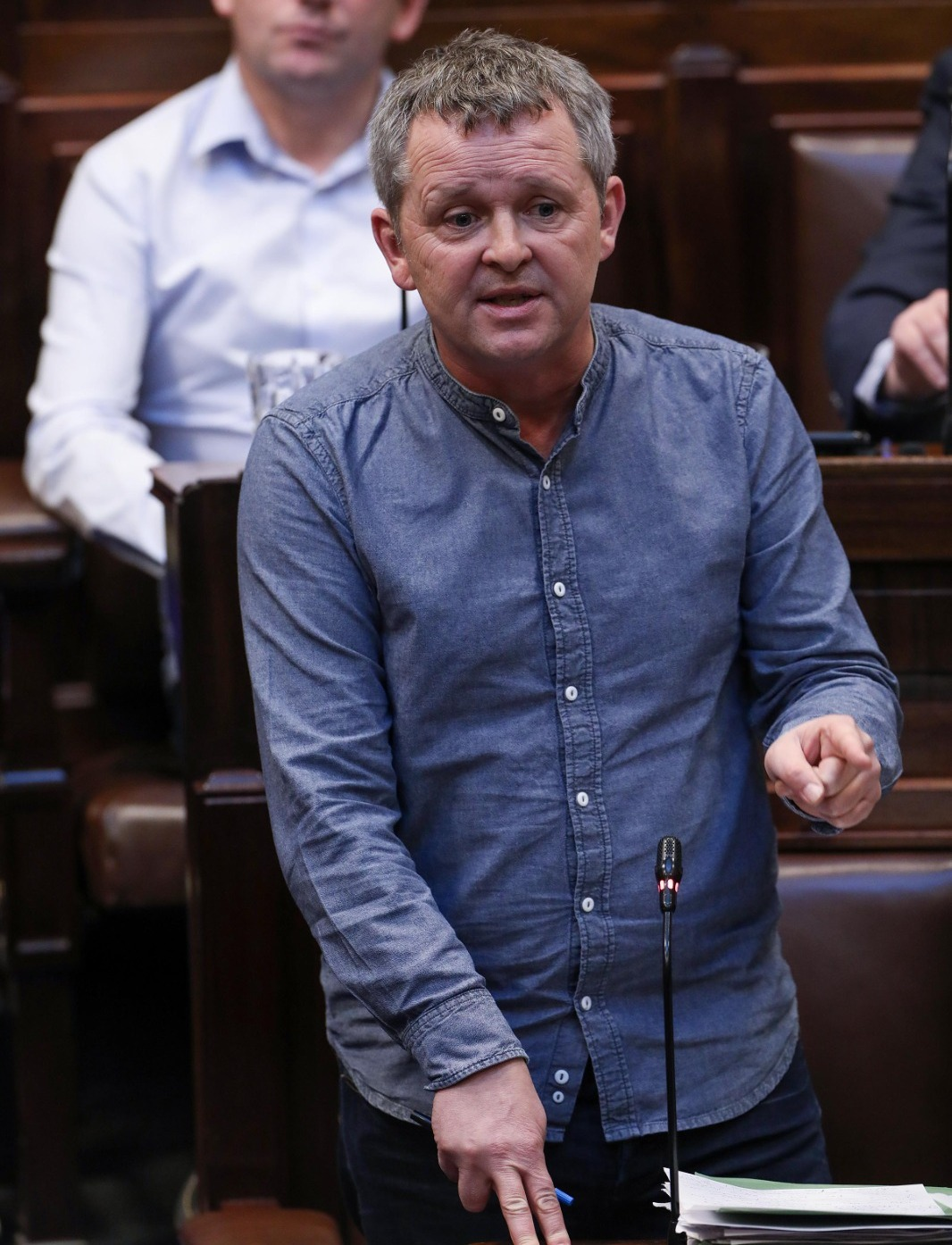
Boyd Barrett speaking in the Dáil in December 2022

At the 2020 Irish general election, Boyd Barrett was again re-elected, topping the poll. On 10 October 2024, he became leader of People Before Profit. He was re-elected on the final count at the 2024 Irish general election. Boyd Barrett stepped back from politics from April to October 2025, while undergoing successful treatment for throat cancer.

Elections to the Dáil
Party	Election		FPv	FPv%	Result
Socialist Workers	Dún Laoghaire	2002	876	1.6	Eliminated on count 6/11
People Before Profit	Dún Laoghaire	2007	5,233	8.9	Eliminated on count 10/10
People Before Profit	Dún Laoghaire	2011	6,206	10.9	Elected on count 11/11
AAA–PBP (Note: Boyd Barrett is a member of People Before Profit.)	Dún Laoghaire	2016	9,775	16.5	Elected on count 6/7
Solidarity–PBP	Dún Laoghaire	2020	9,632	15.5	Elected on count 7/8
PBP–Solidarity	Dún Laoghaire	2024	6,795	12.2	Elected on count 7/7

== Campaigns and policies ==
=== Domestic policy ===
During the 1990s, Boyd Barrett was part of the Irish wing of the Anti-Nazi League. He was also involved with the anti-bin tax campaign and the anti-globalisation movement, having been arrested in 2001 and charged over disturbances at a protest. He campaigned against Ireland's bank-bail outs, as well as the National Asset Management Agency (NAMA), and organised protests and supported initiatives such as The Right to Work Campaign. He also proposed direct investment in public enterprise and strategic industry to create jobs in areas such as renewable energy, food production, generic medicines and IT development. Boyd Barrett has organised a campaign to oppose the sale of St Michael's Hospital to private developers, led campaigns to protect public amenities in Dún Laoghaire, including the Save Our Seafront campaign against a high rise development on the site of the Dún Laoghaire baths, and he has also campaigned to prevent the acquisition of Dún Laoghaire harbour by private companies. In a 2021 private members bill, Boyd Barrett called for the Leaving Cert to be abolished and for all students to be able to study any course of their choice regardless of exam results.

=== Foreign policy ===
Boyd Barrett helped to organise mass protests against the war in Iraq in 2003. He addressed the Dublin leg of the 20 March 2003 International Day of Action. He said that it was "almost certain" that any war would lead to between 50,000 and 100,000 deaths. He said "the complicity of the Irish government in this murderous war through providing facilities for the US military at Shannon airport" was "an absolute disgrace" and urged people to protest in their thousands "to show this carnage is not being mounted in our names". In 2009, he supported the pro-democracy protests in Iran.

In March 2005, according to the Irish Anti-War organisation, Boyd Barrett attended the Cairo Anti-war Conference in Cairo, Egypt, focusing on American intervention in Iraq. In 2007, he called for Ibrahim Mousawi, head of the Hezbollah-owned Al-Manar TV station, to be allowed to enter Ireland to attend a Dublin conference organised by the Irish Anti-War Movement. According to the Irish Independent, Boyd Barrett said that banning Mousawi amounted to the suppression of "free public debate in the country". In April 2009, Boyd Barrett addressed the Al-Aqsa Festival fundraising event held at the RDS Concert Hall in Dublin. He said that Israel is "a state built on violence, oppression and apartheid" and "has no right to exist as long as it denies rights to Palestinians."

After the outbreak of the Gaza war Boyd Barrett addressed a pro-Palestine rally and compared the situation to the then ongoing Russian invasion of Ukraine, suggesting that there was a double standard in how the conflicts were perceived in the West. During a session of the Dáil, Boyd Barrett accused Israel of committing ethnic cleansing and taking part in war crimes, and condemned Western governments for failing to hold the Israeli government accountable.

Dáil	Election	Deputy (Party)	Deputy (Party)	Deputy (Party)	Deputy (Party)	Deputy (Party)
21st	1977	David Andrews (FF)	Liam Cosgrave (FG)	Barry Desmond (Lab)	Martin O'Donoghue (FF)	4 seats 1977–1981
22nd	1981	David Andrews (FF)	Liam T. Cosgrave (FG)	Barry Desmond (Lab)	Martin O'Donoghue (FF)	Seán Barrett (FG)
23rd	1982 (Feb)	David Andrews (FF)	Liam T. Cosgrave (FG)	Barry Desmond (Lab)	Martin O'Donoghue (FF)	Seán Barrett (FG)
24th	1982 (Nov)	David Andrews (FF)	Liam T. Cosgrave (FG)	Barry Desmond (Lab)	Monica Barnes (FG)	Seán Barrett (FG)
25th	1987	David Andrews (FF)	Geraldine Kennedy (PDs)	Barry Desmond (Lab)	Monica Barnes (FG)	Seán Barrett (FG)
26th	1989	David Andrews (FF)	Brian Hillery (FF)	Eamon Gilmore (WP)	Monica Barnes (FG)	Seán Barrett (FG)
27th	1992	David Andrews (FF)	Helen Keogh (PDs)	Eamon Gilmore (DL)	Niamh Bhreathnach (Lab)	Seán Barrett (FG)
28th	1997	David Andrews (FF)	Monica Barnes (FG)	Eamon Gilmore (Lab)	Mary Hanafin (FF)	Seán Barrett (FG)
29th	2002	Barry Andrews (FF)	Fiona O'Malley (PDs)	Eamon Gilmore (Lab)	Mary Hanafin (FF)	Ciarán Cuffe (GP)
30th	2007	Barry Andrews (FF)	Seán Barrett (Note: Served as Ceann Comhairle in the 31st Dáil from 2011 to 2016 and was returned automatically at the 2016 general election.) (FG)	Eamon Gilmore (Lab)	Mary Hanafin (FF)	Ciarán Cuffe (GP)
31st	2011	Mary Mitchell O'Connor (FG)	Seán Barrett (FG)	Eamon Gilmore (Lab)	Richard Boyd Barrett (PBP)	4 seats from 2011
32nd	2016	Mary Mitchell O'Connor (FG)	Seán Barrett (FG)	Maria Bailey (FG)	Richard Boyd Barrett (AAA–PBP)	4 seats from 2011
33rd	2020	Jennifer Carroll MacNeill (FG)	Ossian Smyth (GP)	Cormac Devlin (FF)	Richard Boyd Barrett (S–PBP)	4 seats from 2011
34th	2024	Jennifer Carroll MacNeill (FG)	Barry Ward (FG)	Cormac Devlin (FF)	Richard Boyd Barrett (PBP–S)	4 seats from 2011
