= A Little Journey =

1927 film

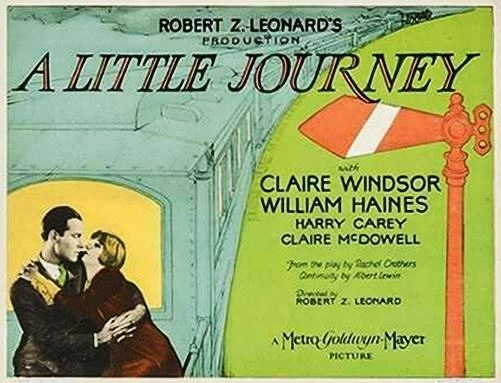
- Film poster
- Directed by: Robert Z. Leonard
- Written by: Rachel Crothers (play); Albert Lewin; George Marion Jr.
- Produced by: Robert Z. Leonard
- Starring: Claire Windsor; William Haines; Harry Carey
- Cinematography: Ira H. Morgan
- Edited by: William LeVanway
- Production company: Metro-Goldwyn-Mayer
- Distributed by: Metro-Goldwyn-Mayer
- Release date: January 1, 1927
- Running time: 64 minutes
- Country: United States
- Language: Silent with English intertitles

A Little Journey is a 1927 American silent comedy film directed by Robert Z. Leonard and featuring Claire Windsor, William Haines and Harry Carey. It is based on a play by Rachel Crothers. No prints are thought to survive of this film. It is therefore considered lost.

== Plot ==
A girl travelling by train to meet her boyfriend meets another young man and falls in love with him.

== Cast ==
- Claire Windsor as Julia Rutherford
- William Haines as George Manning
- Harry Carey as Alexander Smith
- Claire McDowell as Aunt Louise
- Lawford Davidson as Alfred Demis
