= Wife to James Whelan =

1937 play by Theresa Deevy

Wife to James Whelan: A Play in Three Acts
- Original language: English
- Written by: Teresa Deevy
- Characters: James Whelan; Nan Bowers; Kate Moran; Jack McClinsey; Bill McGafferty; Apollo Moran; Nora Keane; Tom Carey

Premiere
- Date: 1944 (radio); 2010 (stage production)
- Place: BBC Radio (radio); Mint Theater, NYC (stage production)

Wife to James Whelan: A Play in Three Acts, is a play written in 1937 by Irish playwright Teresa Deevy. This was Deevy's first work to be rejected after having six consecutive plays produced and performed at the Abbey Theatre. The play follows protagonist James Whelan through his journey to success, while dealing with his complicated relationship with his childhood sweetheart, Nan. The play focuses on the conflict between ambition and contentment—a sensitive topic in the new Ireland.

== Synopsis ==
=== Act I ===
A sunny sheltered spot on the outskirts of an Irish town—Killbeggan, Early summer

Act I begins with Nan, Kate, Bill, and Tom chattering about the job prospect in Dublin, and whether or not James got it. Bill flirts with Nan despite her lack of interest, and they gossip, saying that once Whelan leaves Nan will find herself in the arms of another. Jack rides over on his bike, and Nan is visibly softer and sweeter with him. He is from the town over but is starting a new job at Tobin's, a position previously held by James. It is evident that a relationship is likely to develop between Jack and Nan. James enters, declaring that he has been offered the job and that he is leaving for Dublin tonight. He and Nan bicker about him leaving, as he wants her to wait for him while she wants him to stay. Jack returns and there is tension between the two men. As people leave, Kate advises James that if he wants Nan, he must secure her before he leaves. The scene ends with James planning a big goodbye, asking Kate to bring everyone to the train before he leaves.

=== Act II ===
The office of the silver wings motor service, early summer. Seven years later

Act II takes place seven years after Act I. James has returned to Kilbeggan and now owns Silver Wings Motor Service. Apollo Moran works as a bookkeeper for James. Nan enters the shop to ask James for work. She and Jack were married for two years before he died, and now she must provide for their child alone. She is distant and detached from James while he seems hopeful that they may rekindle their relationship. As they are speaking, Nora enters looking for James. Apollo has her wait until James and Nan are finished speaking, and James is appalled with that decision and has Nan wait outside while he meets with the Nora. While James and Nora are flirtatious with one another, James appears to be uncomfortable with some of Nora's behavior. Meanwhile, there is a talk between Tom and Apollo about James' need to choose a wife, discussing both Kate and Nora. Kate arrives at Silver Wings, and she tells James she would like to see him married. They reminisce and she says if things were different they could be married, but she ultimately advises him to propose to Nora. James and Nan return to his office where James offers Nan a job taking over Apollo's post as a bookkeeper, to allow Apollo to drive buses with Tom. He tells her he will give her one pound straight away so she can buy new clothes for work. However, when Nan believes herself to be alone, she takes some money off of James' desk. James sees this and confronts Nan, and the scene ends with him calling the police to arrest Nan.

=== Act III ===
Same as act II, six months later

The scene opens with James, Tom, and Apollo talking about business. Nan enters to speak to James. She has just been released from jail, where James ensured she would get the toughest sentence possible. She is again asking for work, saying she will do anything. James offers her a demeaning and laborious job, scrubbing and tending to the fire, yet he condemns her for having no dignity in accepting this type of work. He mentions that she will need to come in early to tend the fire if Bill comes, as James is considering a business partnership between their two businesses. Nan becomes visibly anxious at the mention of Bill, and she quickly shifts subjects leading to an argument. She insists that while she stole from James, his actions in the aftermath were far worse. Mid-argument, Kate arrives at the shop and interrupts the two to speak with James. She tries to convince him to give Nan better work, urging him to forgive her since she is in a difficult situation. She leaves, and Tom and Nan talk about the incident from Act II. He says James only reacted so harshly because he still loves Nan, and mentions that James is still in search of a wife. Nora enters to speak with James, and he flirts openly with her in front of Nan. Nora notices that James still harbors feelings for Nan and confronts him about their relationship. Incited by jealousy, she taunts James before inviting him to a party later that evening at her house. Next Bill arrives to discuss the offer of employment James has made him, with the intention to negotiate the terms of the offer. Mid-conversation, Bill reveals that he and Nan were going to get married, but that she retracted her acceptance, refusing him. Upon learning this, James retracts the offer. He subsequently speaks with Nan, who reveals that after Jack died, Bill was very persistent with her for her hand in marriage. While she originally agreed thinking it would be best for her child, she could not go through with it. After she rejected Bill, he accused her of stealing money from him. She explains to James that that is why she tried to steal his money because she was in debt to Bill and she saw how easy it could be. James takes pity on Nan and offers her the position as bookkeeper again, before swiftly exiting and punching Bill in the street. He returns to find Nora and implies that there will be some sort of legal action taken against him. He says that despite the trouble he is in, if she will still have him, he will attend her party and ask her father for her hand in marriage.

== Characters ==
- James Whelan: James is a young man living in small-town Ireland in Act I, with dreams of success. James is ambitious and hardworking, yet proud and stubborn. He is in his mid-twenties in Act I and described as strong and handsome.
- Nan Bowers: Nan is James' love interest. She has a relationship with James, Jack, and Bill, and has a child with Jack. She is practical and realistic, but equally proud and stubborn as James.
- Kate Moran: A woman in her mid-twenties in Act I, she and Whelan have a complicated relationship. She lives with her mother and younger siblings and is the older sister to Apollo Moran.
- Jack McClinsey: A young, unassuming and delicate man in his mid-twenties in Act I, who moves to Killbeggan for work. He and Nan marry and have a child together.
- Bill McGafferty: A townsperson from Kilbeggan, about twenty-seven years old in Act I. Bill is the assumed rival of James, both in career and in social life.
- Apollo Moran: Kate's younger brother, introduced in Act II, who works for James at Silver Wings Motor Service. He is very loyal to James and hopes that he will marry.
- Nora Keane: A young woman vying for James Whelan in the beginning of Act II. She is quite beautiful and comes from a well-off family.
- Tom Carey: One of the men in Kilbeggan, about 32 years old in Act I. He drives buses for Whelan at Silver Wings Motor Service. Despite his employment by James Whelan, he harbors some resentment towards him.

== Rejection from the Abbey ==
In 1942, Deevy submitted Wife to James Whelan to the Abbey Theatre, where six of her previous works had been well-received. The Wild Goose, her sixth play, had been performed in 1935 when the Abbey became the first subsidized theatre in the English speaking world. The Minister of Finance, Ernest Blythe, granted the Abbey an annual subsidy, and from 1941-1961 Blythe was the managing director for the theatre. He read Wife to James Whelan and immediately rejected it. He wrote to Deevy explaining that its characters closely resembled those in another one of her plays, Katie Roche, and therefore it would not be a financial possibility. Deevy wrote to a friend saying, "Blythe's letter when returning it showed clearly that he had no use for my work—never asked to see any more. Said the characters were too like Katie Roche. No one else could see this resemblance... The subject matter is quite different. I suppose any play by an author has a certain resemblance—the author's viewpoint, but that is all." Blythe's rejection of the play is argued to have been due to his conservative values. The Republic of Ireland was established in 1937, and the rise of a conservative Fianna Fáil party led to increased censorship—the Abbey was subsidized and therefore needed to be in accordance with the government. Many consider the political undertones in Wife to James Whelan and Ireland's new barring of women in the workforce outlined in the 1937 Constitution as the reason for Blythe's rejection. Deevy then sent the play to the Players theatre, which could not produce the show due to a lack of cast. The rejection of Wife to James Whelan marked the end of Deevy's relationship with the Abbey and the beginning of a shift to conservative ideologies by the theatre.

== Production ==
Wife to James Whelan was performed on BBC radio in 1944. The Mint Theater Company in New York City first performed the play in 2010, after Deevy's nephew discovered the script in the 1990s. The show ran from July 29 to October 3, 2010. The production process included a fully staged production, directed by Jonathan Bank, with well-researched program notes, post-performance discussions, audio and video recordings, a publication of Deevy's collected works, and an academic conference with Trinity College Dublin. It received some strong reviews in the press, including praise from The New York Times. Others critiqued the production, with Variety calling the play a "pedestrian piece of writing." The piece received its British premiere at the New Diorama Theatre in London in 2011 directed by Gavin McAlinden and was Critics' Choice in The Guardian, The Daily Telegraph and The Independent on Sunday.
