= Teresa Deevy =

Deaf Irish dramatist and writer

- Born: 21 January 1894; Waterford, Ireland
- Died: 19 January 1963 (aged 68); Waterford, Ireland
- Education: University College Dublin; University College Cork
- Writing career
- Pen name: D.V. Goode
- Years active: 1930–48
- Notable works: Katie Roche, Wife to James Whelan, Temporal Powers
- Literary movement: Irish Literary Revival, expressionism

Teresa Deevy (21 January 1894 – 19 January 1963) was an Irish dramatist and writer, who was deaf from the age of 19. Best known for her works for theatre, she was also a short story writer, and writer for radio.

== Early life ==
Teresa Deevy was born on 21 January 1894 in Waterford, Ireland. She was the youngest of 13 siblings, all girls. Her mother was Mary Feehan Deevy and her father was Edward Deevy who died when she was two years old.

Deevy attended the Ursuline Convent in Waterford and in 1913, aged 19, she enrolled in University College Dublin, to become a teacher. However, that same year, Deevy became deaf through Ménière's disease and had to relocate to University College Cork so she could receive treatment in the Cork Ear, Eye, and Throat Hospital, while also being closer to the family home. In 1914 she went to London to learn lip-reading and returned to Ireland in 1919. She started writing plays and contributing articles and stories to the press around 1919.

== Nationalist movement ==
Deevy returned to Ireland in 1919, during the Irish War of Independence, and this greatly influenced her writing and ideology. She was strongly involved in the nationalist cause, and much admired Constance Markievicz. She joined the Cumann na mBan, an Irish women's Republican group and auxiliary to the Irish Volunteers. Her Republican, and even proto-feminist, views can be clearly seen in plays such as Katie Roche and The King of Spain's Daughter.

== At the Abbey Theatre ==
In 1930, Deevy had her first production at the Abbey Theatre, Reapers. Many more followed in rapid succession, such as In Search of Valour, Temporal Powers, The King of Spain's Daughter and Katie Roche, the play she is perhaps best known for. These works came just after writers such as W. B. Yeats and Lady Gregory and many believed she would be among those who would take up the mantle as part of a new generation of Irish playwrights for a theatre whose reputation had always rested on its writers. Her works were generally very well-received with some of them winning competitions, becoming headline performances, or being revived numerous times. Her plays were often quietly subversive, many being written just before or during the birth of the Republic of Ireland in 1937. After a number of plays staged in the Abbey, her relationship with the theatre soured over the rejection (Note: Minister for Finance Ernest Blythe, granted the Abbey an annual subsidy, and from 1941-1961 Blythe was the managing director for the theatre. He read Wife to James Whelan and immediately rejected it. He wrote to Deevy explaining that its characters closely resembled those of Katie Roche, and therefore it would not be a financial possibility.) of her play, Wife to James Whelan in 1937. This was later produced by Daisy Bannard Cogley at her Studio Theatre Club, Upper Mount Street in 1956.

== Work on radio ==
After Deevy stopped writing plays for the Abbey, she mainly concentrated on radio, a remarkable feat considering she had already become deaf before radio had become a popular medium in Ireland in the mid-to-late 1920s. Deevy had a prolific output for twenty years on Radio Éireann and on the BBC. including adaptations of previous works such as Temporal Powers and Katie Roche and also an adaptation of Anton Chekhov's Polinka. Her play ‘Within a marble city’ was awarded first prize in the Radio Éireann drama competition (1948). Two of her plays were eventually broadcast on television by the BBC while they have also enjoyed several stage-revivals since her death, most recently by the Mint Theater Company in New York.

== Literary themes ==
The themes that are most common with Deevy plays are those where options for women are severely limited in society, where women are trapped by domestic life, or must choose between a loveless marriage or a life of drudgery. Deevy was often critical of the intensely Catholic society she lived in for its oppressive and repressive views on women. She was critical also of the Irish theater scene and especially of literary censorship, questioning the roles, rights, and power of the censor, and also how to remove them. She wrote about the women who struggle for survival and the lust over wanting a better life, how this privilege might seem attractive, until it is revealed that the "better life" comes with its set of struggles too. She also explores the "individual’s negotiation between self and society where the personal is political."

== Later life ==
In 1954, Deevy was elected to the Irish Academy of Letters in recognition of her contribution to Irish theatre. Deevy enjoyed renewed interest in her work from the mid-1950s onwards after Irish poet John Jordan published a study of her plays in the University Review in 1956.

Deevy returned to Waterford after the death of her sister Nell, with whom she had lived in Dublin and on whom she was very reliant as a lip-reading interpreter. Deevy became a familiar figure in Waterford city as she cycled around the city on her "High Nelly" bike. When her health began to fail she was eventually admitted to the Maypark Nursing Home in Waterford city and died there in 1963, aged 68.

== Legacy ==
Katie Roche, Temporal Powers, Wife to James Whelan and The Suitcase Under the Bed were staged and produced by Mint Theater Company in New York, under the "Teresa Deevy Project" that aims to acknowledge and honour what some describe as "One of Ireland’s best and most neglected dramatists."

An honorary blue plaque is hung in honour of Deevy in the city of Waterford, on Passage Road, by courtesy of the Waterford Civic Trust.

In 2011, Deevy's papers were deposited with the Maynooth University library & archives. The holdings include draft and finished versions of Deevy's completed works and incomplete works as well as contemporary newspaper clippings related to Deevy's works, published versions of Deevy's writings and personal correspondence.

Her play, The King of Spain's Daughter, is currently on the reading list for Junior Cycle English.

== Published works ==
=== Stage Plays ===
- The Reapers (lost play) (1930)
- A Disciple/ In Search of Valour (1931)
- Temporal Powers (1932)
- The King of Spain's Daughter (1935)
- Katie Roche (1936)
- The Wild Goose (1936)
- Wife to James Whelan (1937)
- Strange Birth (1946)
- Light Falling (1947)
- Within a Marble City (1948)
- Eyes and No Eyes
- The Finding of the Ball
- In the Cellar of My Friend
- MacConglinne
- A Minute's Wait
- 3 plays written under the alias D.V. Goode, Practice and Precept, Let Us Live, and The Firstborn
- At least 3 unfinished, untitled plays

=== Radio Plays ===
- Wife to James Whelan (radio adaptation of Deevy's stage play)
- Polinka (radio play adaptation of Chekhov's "Polinka") (1946)
- Dignity (radio play) (1947)
- Light Falling (radio adaptation of Deevy's stage play)
- Within a Marble City (radio adaptation of Deevy's stage play)
- Holiday House
- Going Beyond Alma's Glory (radio play) (1949)
- Concerning Meagher, or How Did He Die?
- In the Cellar of My Friend (radio adaptation of Deevy's stage play)
- Supreme Dominion (1957)
- One Look- and What it Led to
- Possession-Cattle of the Gods (ballet treatment/ libretto)

=== Short stories ===
- Strange People (1946)
- Just Yesterday: A Story
- The Greatest Wonder in the World: A Christmas Story
- Alen
- Brian of the Boers
- Lisheen at the Valley Farm
- John Potter's Story
- Flash Back
- Adventure

=== Essays ===
- Patricia Lynch: A Study (1948)
- Man Proposes
