= Katie Roche =

1936 expressionist play by Irish playwright Teresa Deevy

- Poster for the 2013 Mint Theater revival
- Written by: Teresa Deevy
- Characters: Jo Mahony; Amelia Gregg; Reuben; Katie Roche; Margaret Drybone; Stanislaus Gregg; Frank Lawlor; Michael Maguire
- Original language: English
- Genre: expressionism
- Setting: Ireland, 1930s

Premiere
- Date premiered: 16 March 1936
- Place premiered: Abbey Theatre, Dublin, Irish Free State

Katie Roche is a 1936 expressionist play by Irish playwright Teresa Deevy. It has been staged by the Abbey Theatre eleven times with the most recent revival being in 2017.

Described as a "reputed favourite with amateur dramatic societies and theatre groups" the play has been staged by a broad range of companies, notable amongst these are productions by Radio Éireann, Lennox Robinson in the Torch Theatre and New York's Mint Theater Company.
