= Ellen Pollock =

British actress (1902–1997)

- Born: Ellen Clara Meyer; 29 June 1902; Heidelberg, Germany
- Died: 29 March 1997 (aged 93); London, England, UK
- Occupations: Actress, director
- Spouse(s): Leslie Hancock (1929–1944; his death); James Proudfoot (1945–1971; his death)
- Children: 1

Ellen Pollock (29 June 1902 – 29 March 1997) was a British character actress who mainly appeared on stage in London's West End. She also appeared in several films and TV productions.

The second child of Hanover merchant Adolph Meyer (1890-?) and Hedwig née Kahn (1876-1965), sister of Otto Hermann Kahn (wealthy investment banker, collector, philanthropist, and patron of the arts) and composer Robert Kahn, she became the stepdaughter of Raymond Anselmo Pollak (c. 1872-c. 1930) when her divorced mother remarried in April 1904 to the Austrian businessman, who himself had two sons from a first marriage to Elsa Julia Harris, a New Zealander.

A devotee of Bernard Shaw, she was president of the Shaw Society from 1949. In its obituary, The Independent wrote "Pollock is believed to have played, in a career spanning 72 years, more Shavian heroines than anyone else. She directed London seasons of his plays; and it was during the London premiere of one of his lesser-known works – Farfetched Fables (Watergate, 1950) – that she announced Shaw's death from the stage."

Pollock's dedication to acting began as a seven-year-old, when she saw Sarah Bernhardt on stage; she knew then that she wanted to be an actress herself. Pollock was also a theatre director and a teacher of drama at RADA and Webber Douglas Academy of Dramatic Art; and her varied television work included several appearances in The Forsyte Saga for the BBC.

She outlived both of her husbands, Captain Leslie Hancock and the artist James Proudfoot. She had one child with Hancock. Pollock was the subject of TV's This Is Your Life in 1992.

== Selected filmography ==
- Moulin Rouge (1928) – Girl
- Piccadilly (1929) – Vamp (uncredited)
- The Informer (1929) – Prostitute
- Too Many Crooks (1930, short) – Rose
- Night Birds (1930) – Flossie
- Let's Love and Laugh (1931)
- The Wife's Family (1931) – Dolly White
- 77 Park Lane (1931; uncredited)
- A Gentleman of Paris (1931; uncredited)
- Midnight (1931)
- The First Mrs. Fraser (1932) – Maid
- The Last Coupon (1932) – Eliza (uncredited)
- Heads We Go (1933) – Madame
- Channel Crossing (1933) – Minor Role
- Royal Cavalcade (1935)
- It's a Bet (1935) – Mrs. Joe
- The Happy Family (1936) – Leo Hutt
- Aren't Men Beasts! (1937) – The Vamp
- The Street Singer (1937) – Gloria Weston
- Non-Stop New York (1937) – Miss Harvey
- Splinters in the Air (1937) – Charles' Wife
- Millions (1937) – Janet Mason (uncredited)
- Sons of the Sea (1939) – Margaret Hulls
- Spare a Copper (1940) – Lady Hardstaff
- Kiss the Bride Goodbye (1945) – Gladys Dodd
- Don Chicago (1945) – Lady Vanessa
- Bedelia (1946) – McKelvey's Housekeeper
- Warning to Wantons (1949) – Baroness de Jammes
- Something in the City (1950) – Mrs. Holley
- To Have and to Hold (1951) – Roberta
- The Galloping Major (1951) – Horsey Lady
- The Fake (1953) – Miss Fossett
- The Golden Link (1954) – Madame Sonia
- The Time of His Life (1955) – Lady Florence Carter-Wilson née Pastry
- Not So Dusty (1956) — Agatha
- The Hypnotist (1957) – Barbara Barton
- The Gypsy and the Gentleman (1958) – Haggard's Maid
- The Long Knife (1958) – Mrs. Cheam
- So Evil, So Young (1961) – Miss Smith
- Master Spy (1964) – Dr. Morrell
- Rapture (1965) – Landlady
- Who Killed the Cat? (1966) – Ruth Prendergast
- Finders Keepers (1966) – Grandma
- Horror Hospital (1973) – Aunt Harris
- The Wicked Lady (1983) – Mrs. Munce
