= Eileen O'Casey =

Irish actress and author (1900–1995)

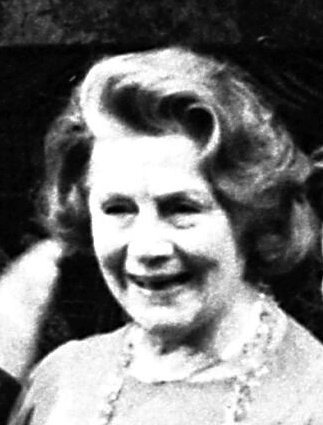
- O'Casey in 1974
- Born: Eileen Kathleen Reynolds; 27 December 1900; Dublin, Ireland
- Died: 9 April 1995 (aged 94); Northwood, London, England
- Other name: Eileen Carey
- Occupations: Actress, author
- Spouse: Seán O'Casey (m. 1927; died 1964)
- Children: 3, including Breon O'Casey

Eileen Kathleen O'Casey (née Reynolds; 27 December 1900 – 9 April 1995), also known by the stage name Eileen Carey, was an Irish actress and author.

== Early life ==
Eileen O'Casey was born Eileen Kathleen Reynolds in Dublin on 27 December 1900. She was the youngest daughter of Athlone accountant Edward Reynolds and his wife Kathleen Reynolds (née Carey), a nurse from County Mayo. Her parents had been married and begun their family in South Africa, where they had two sons, one of whom died there. The family had returned to Ireland due to the outbreak of the Second Boer War.

When she was a child, the family suffered due to her father's mental health and poor financial choices, which resulted in him losing their Dublin house through gambling. Following this, the family moved to London. In London, O'Casey's remaining brother died. As her father had returned to South Africa, and her mother was working as a live-in nurse, O'Casey was sent to an orphanage boarding school run by the Sisters of Charity. Following a nervous breakdown, her father died. This resulted in some of O'Casey's more wealthy relatives paying for her education in the Brentwood Ursuline Convent High School. It was here that she became interested in choral singing and theatre. A severe illness resulted in O'Casey withdrawing from schooling. Once she had recovered, she took up employment as a tracer within a number of London firms while taking singing and dancing lessons.

O'Casey had her first professional performances in Gilbert and Sullivan operettas with the D'Oyly Carte Opera Company in 1923 and 1924. She took her mother's maiden name as a stage name, and performed in musical comedy in England and America and modelled under the name Eileen Carey from 1925 to 1926.

== Career and family life ==
Having read Seán O'Casey's Juno and the Paycock, she developed an obsessive need to meet the author. Upon her return to London from New York, she arranged an introduction to him. She was 17 years his junior, and he immediately invited her to take the role of Nora Clitheroe in The Plough and the Stars for its first London production. In this role she replaced the original actress who had fallen ill after three weeks. While Eileen was continuing an affair with the married American theatre impresario Lee Ephraim, Seán began to court her doggedly. Eileen appeared in her second role in an O'Casey play in June 1927, playing Minnie Powell in the West End production of The Shadow of a Gunman. It was produced as a double bill with John Millington Synge's Riders to the Sea, in which she played a keener.

The O'Caseys married on 23 September 1927 in the Catholic church of All Souls and the Redeemer in Chelsea. Their first child was born in April 1928. O'Casey continued her acting career, appearing in Noël Coward's Bitter Sweet, then in The Miracle by Max Reinhardt. Her final stage role immediately before her retirement was in the 1932 musical Mother of Pearl. The couple had two sons and one daughter: Breon born 1928, Niall born 1935, and Shivaun born 1939. Niall died of leukaemia in 1956.

The couple were known for their wide circle of friends that included writers, artists, actors, politicians, and aristocrats. They lived in London and Buckinghamshire, before moving to Totnes (1938–1954) and then Torquay (1954–1964). During their time in Devon, O'Casey helped to care for her aging mother, although the relationship was never easy. She was noted for having provided O'Casey with "one of the most contented home lives in literary history", supporting the family through periods of financial difficulties and her husband's blindness in later life.

== Later life ==
Following the death of her husband in 1964, O'Casey lived in Dún Laoghaire for a few years. She then moved back to London, visiting Dublin and New York frequently as she wrote and lectured on her life with O'Casey. She authored three books: Sean (1971), Eileen (1976), and Cheerio, Titan (1991). O'Casey died at Denville Hall home for retired actors in London on 9 April 1995. She was cremated at Golders Green Crematorium, with her ashes scattered at the same place as her husband's.
