= Herman Henry Yeatman Woolf =

British artist who died in police custody

- Born: 23 June 1902
- Died: 23 November 1962 (aged 60)
- Spouses: Mamie Clara Hurman (m. 1927; div. 1937) Margaret Meta Luis Gerbeit (m. 1937; div. 1947)

Herman Henry Yeatman "Hal" Woolf (23 June 1902 – 23 November 1962) was a British artist who died in police custody under disputed circumstances. His second ex-wife, Greta, campaigned for an official inquiry. The Government held an enquiry chaired by Norman Skelhorn QC, which was held in private. The final report was published in March 1964 and the evidence released to the UK National Archives in 1995. This inquiry led to changes in police procedure notably with regard to charging semi-conscious or unconscious suspects.

This case was also the start of Private Eye becoming an investigative as well as a satirical magazine.

== Early life ==
Hal Woolf was the second child born in Hampstead to Michael Yeatman Woolf (20 January 1869-14 May 1941) and his wife Rose Woolf née Nashelski (January 1872- 4 November 1940). His father was a dentist in Wimpole Street, London and his mother was Jewish and born in Christchurch, New Zealand. She was a published author of children's books under the name Rose Yeatman Woolf. He had an elder sister, Eileen Hine Yeatman Woolf who was born in 1898 and died of cancer in 1918.

== Education ==
After education at the Liberal Jewish Synagogue in St Johns Wood Hal attended Warwick House school in Westminster and then studied at the City & Guilds Engineering College in London where he gained a BSc in Engineering in 1920. He did not attend Westminster School and London University as stated in Police records and contemporary newspapers. Following this he studied art at Chelsea Polytechnic under Bernard Adams from 1920–1922 and later in Paris at the Académie de la Grande Chaumière.

== Life and career ==
=== Artist ===
He exhibited at the Redfern Gallery and with the Royal Academy, Royal Institute of Oil Painters, Royal Society of Portrait Painters, the London Group, and with the National Society of Painters and Gravers to which body he was elected a member in 1946.

Hal's first solo exhibition of 50 works was at The Redfern Gallery from 19 September to 12 October 1929 which was reviewed in the Yorkshire Post & Leeds Intelligencer: "interesting, alive, and rich in promise", "well up in the second class".

The Times also reviewed the exhibition: "Mr Woolf will paint better when he simplifies his motives"

There was a posthumous exhibition of Woolf's work at the Woodstock Gallery in 1964. This followed an appeal to lend works by Greta Woolf. The exhibition was reviewed by Arthur Moyse in Freedom, The Anarchist Weekly, on 18 January 1964:

"of a type and style that graces so many conservative mixed shows", "pitched in the key of Pissarro", "Colour dies upon the canvas and every scene is seen through a grey veil", "Yet for all that Woolf was a man who loved his craft", "Hal Woolf deserves to be honoured, not for any cultural values it may offer but as the work of a man who loved the craft he chose to practice".

Hal painted in oil, watercolour and gouache. His work comprised townscapes, landscapes and portraits. The commissioned portraits seem to mostly date from the interwar years. A number of his portraits, especially the later ones, are of friends. Among those he is known to have painted are Oliver Messel and two of Beatrice Eden, the first wife of Anthony Eden.

His 1930s landscapes & townscapes are often of Spanish scenes. In the 1950s he painted scenes closer to where he lived at 21 Delamere Terrace, Paddington.

=== Author ===
Hal had a short story "Twenty-Four Hours", published in a collection of short stories by different authors in 1934.

=== Other ===
In his Army record Hal listed a number of other jobs: Scenario writer, Animated cartoonist, and Art director (cinema).

When died he was living at 21 Bourne Terrace, Paddington and working for the postal department of London University.

== Spain ==
Hal travelled to Mallorca in November 1935 and his first wife Mamie followed in 1936. Hal went to Ibiza on the weekend of 18-19 July 1936, the day after the Spanish Civil War started on the 17 July 1936, but Mamie stayed in Mallorca. Mamie & Hal were separated by the outbreak of the Battle of Majorca which was from 16 August to 12 September 1936 when the Republican forces attempted an invasion. Mamie returned to England in a destroyer. Subsequently she received a letter from her husband in which he stated that he was living with a woman in France and intended to take a flat for her in London.

Hal was in Barcelona before July 1936 painting landscapes and meeting left-wing intellectuals in bars. During the Spanish Civil War, he had a reputation as a fixer and his sympathies were with the Republicans but he was not a communist. He was in Barcelona during the second half of 1938 and may not have left until early 1939.

The Brian Sewell Archive contains a letter from Brian Sewell to Dick Brewis dated 14 September 1981 which is part of a lengthy correspondence from 1981 to 1982 which describes Hal’s time in Spain. The source is a Spanish emigré, then in his mid-eighties, whose alias was Jesus Hernandez:

1. HW was in Barcelona before July 1936, painting landscapes and mixing with intellectual bar (drinking – not legal) circles.
2. HW "came and went" after the war began. He seemed never to be short of money, though not particularly flush, and he seemed always to know a man who can do whatever had to be done.
3. HW was in Barcelona during the second half of 1938 when things were very difficult, and may not have left until early 1939, by which time Jesus had already left for London.
4. HW’s political sympathies were entirely Republican, but -and Jesus is very determined about this – not communist.
5. HW and Jesus met again in London in early summer 1939. Some time during the following year HW joined the army and left the contents of his studio (mostly Catalan landscapes) with Jesus.
6. Their friendship was never close after the war, even though it was HW’s money and contacts that enabled Jesus to escape from Barcelona during the worst period of the Civil War.
7. HW’s post-war address was for some time 48 Lower Sloane Street, but Jesus is not sure for how long; he also says he was a member of the Chelsea Arts Club.

Hal is on the Electoral Register at 48 Lower Sloane Street in 1946.

== WW2 Service ==
Woolf served as a Temporary Captain in a Royal Engineers camouflage unit in North Africa. His war substantive rank was Lieutenant. Julian Trevelyan in his memoir Indigo Days referred to Hal: "We drive to Haifa, and meet Barclay Russell and Hal Woolf, who is very much in his element as a camouflage officer and who makes many clandestine trips to Jerusalem". In a newspaper report of Hal's first conviction for possession of marijuana it says he was in East Africa. Hal volunteered for the army in 1939, went abroad in 1941 and returned to the UK in 1946. He was discharged with the rank of Captain. He was abroad in the army in the Middle East from at least 1942.

== Use of marijuana ==
Whilst in Cairo during WW2 Hal developed the habit of smoking Indian hemp (marijuana). The Home Office report stated that he made no secret of his use of marijuana and that he did not smoke it in public. He was prosecuted twice: 1946 when he was fined £10 (equivalent to £362 in 2025) and 1948 when he was fined £30 (equivalent to £943 in 2025).

== Connection to the Profumo scandal ==
Hal died in November 1962 and his story broke in August 1963. The Profumo scandal broke at the same time.

Hal knew at least two of the people on the fringes of the Profumo Scandal. In the 1950s he lived at 21 Delamere Terrace, Paddington in a house also lived in by Henry and Ruth Milton. Ruth had previously been known as Elizabeth Hamilton-Marshall. Her daughter Paula Hamilton-Marshall was a close friend of Christine Keeler and went to prison for perjury because she falsely accused Lucky Gordon of attacking Christine whereas it was in fact her brother John.

Hal was close friends with Henry & Ruby Milton and painted both of them, as did Lucian Freud who lived next door. Ruby was the model for Freud's La Voisine and Henry & his stepdaughter Paula were the models for Father & daughter.

Hal made Henry Milton the reserve executor of his will and both Henry & Ruby were beneficiaries.

Hal also knew Vasco Lozzolo.

== Personal life ==
=== First wife - Mamie Clara HURMAN ===
Hal married Mamie Clara Hurman (4 August 1902 – 1 June 1963) on 13 July 1927 and they divorced in 1937 following his adultery with Margaret Gibbons (alias of Margaret Gerbeit) who became Hal's second wife. Mamie did not remarry. They had a child, Peter Conrad Woolf, who died 6 hours after birth on 7 May 1929 having been born prematurely at 7 ½ months.

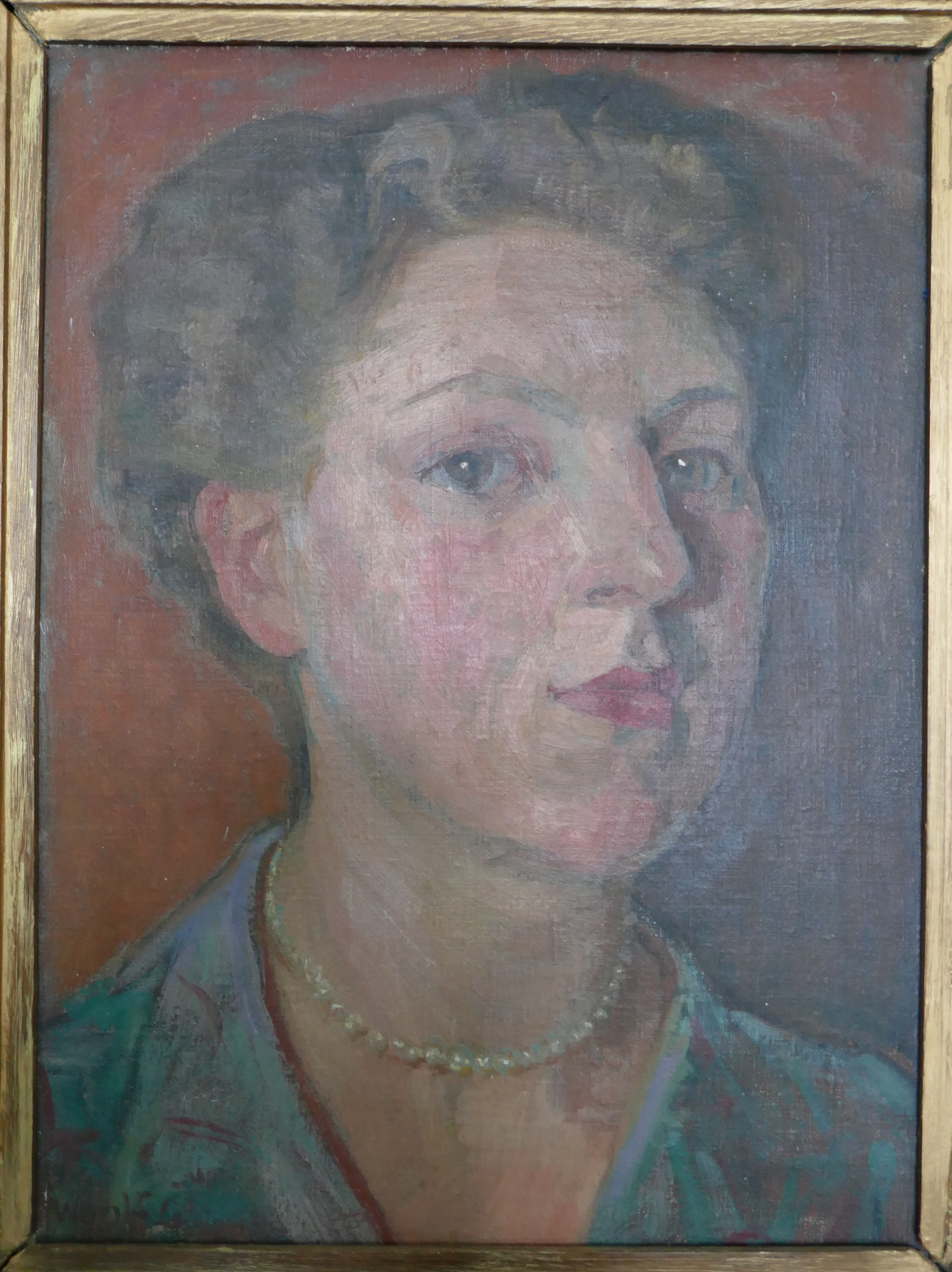
Mamie Clara Woolf

Before WW2 Mamie worked as a part-time personal assistant to Ivor Brown, drama critic of The Observer, for fifteen years until 1942 and also worked as an antiques dealer. From 1942 until 1944 she worked as a secretary in section D/CR of SOE. The section of her SOE personnel file which lists the countries she has been to does not include Spain. In the 1945 General Election Mamie was the election agent for Tom Wintringham. After WW2 Mamie returned to antique dealing and lived with her mother in Winchester. Mamie died on 1 June 1963. Her death certificate says she died of: Peritonitis, Carsinomatosis and Carcinoma of the breast.

=== Second wife - Margaret Meta Luis GERBEIT ===
On 3 October 1939 Hal married Margaret "Greta" Gibbons (19 November 1914-11 September 2011). She gave her father's name as Michael Charles Gibbons and his profession as engineer. Although she gives her name as Margaret Gibbons on the marriage certificate, the 1937 electoral register and the 1939 phone book (as Greta) her real name was Margaret or Greta Meta Luise Gerbeit and she was born in Berlin.

Greta’s father was Gustav Gerbeit. He served in the Imperial German Navy in WW1 and died of pneumonia in 1915. Her mother was Hannah or Hannchen Gerbeit née Gloger (13 April 1889 – 7 September 1945). Hannchen was an early member of the German Communist Party (KPD) and later of the German resistance to the Nazis. She was murdered by a Russian soldier on 7 September 1945.

Hannchen had two children with her husband, Lotte (Charlotte) and Greta (Margaret).

In the 1920s Hannchen met Heinrich Goldberg who started a commune. She had two sons, Vertuelmo and Sajero, with him and a daughter, Tamen, with another member of the commune.

Greta was a member of the Young Communists and came to the attention of the Gestapo.

Her picture appeared on the cover of a communist tear-off calendar in 1930 or 1931, and "Oskar" (her nickname because she was "as cheeky as Oskar", who was a cheeky figure in Berlin underground culture) thus became known throughout Germany.

In the early 1930s she left home and started working as a photographer and model with Traut Hajdu.

In 1933 Greta appeared on the title page of Arbeiter Illustrie Zeitung, a Communist newspaper:

"Grete got the roughest deal of all, at least as seen from our middle class perspective. In 1933, just at the time Hitler came to power, her blond proletarian beauty graced the title page of the Communist Arbeiter Illustrie Zeitung (Worker's Illustrated Newspaper). She had to flee at once, and went to Spain, where she found no other way to make a living except with her beautiful body."

Greta left Germany with her friends and went to Ibiza where there was an embryonic artists’ colony based around the hotel-pension "Ca Vostra" run by Lene-Schneider Kainer.

When the Spanish Civil War started in 1936, Greta left Ibiza. In 1938 Hal Woolf wrote to his wife Mamie that stated he was "living with a woman in France and that he intended to take a flat for her in London".

Greta was brought to England by Hal in the mid to late 1930s.

One of Hal's friends, Stephen Fothergill, described Greta: “Towards the end of the decade [1930s] he married Greta, a boisterous German with short fair hair, bright blue eyes and a snub nose. Her sturdy, shapely legs had fascinated Frank Dobson the English sculptor, for whom she modelled on several occasions.”

Greta lived with Hal at 25 Fitzroy Square, London. After Hal joined the army she moved to 29 Baker Street, London where she stayed until 1947.

After Hal's return from overseas in 1945 they lived together for approximately a month and divorced in 1947. In that the same year Greta went to Venezuela and returned to the UK by 1949.

Greta used a number of aliases. The known ones are Margaret or Greta Gibbons, Margaret or Greta Woolf, Margaret Gibbings and Margaret Cotton.

In the 1950s Greta worked as a theatrical seamstress at the Old Vic and in the 1960s Margaret was an antiques dealer in Shepherds Bush Market and in the 1970s in Pierrepoint Row N1.

Greta's died on 11 September 2011 and her death was registered in Haringey, London.

== Death ==
Hal's death was the subject of two inquiries: an internal one by the Met Police and a Home Office (HO) inquiry. The allegation by Hal's friends was that the Met police had caused his death but both inquiries found that this was not the case. The Home Office inquiry did criticise some aspects of police behaviour.

Hal was knocked down by a car in Park Lane, London and died of his injuries whilst in police custody.

The Home Office inquiry was published by HMSO in March 1964. The inquiry papers and the police files have been available at the UK National Archives since 1995.

On the day of the accident, Saturday 10 November 1962, Hal met two friends, Greta Woolf (his second ex-wife) and Malcolm Dunbar at approx 1:30pm at the York Minster pub in Dean Street. The presence of Malcolm Dunbar was omitted from the official inquiry's published report and from the Private Eye account but is mentioned in the manuscript transcript of the inquiry. Malcolm Dunbar was not called as a witness as he had died in July 1963 in what looked like suicide but the Coroner recorded an open verdict. Hal drank two half pints of beer (The York Minster, now The French House, only serves beer in half pints) and left at approx 2:15pm to visit another friend, Ronald Greville, at Westminster Hospital, a distance of approximately 1 ½ miles, arriving at approx 3pm. He left there at about 3:45pm.

Hal's Saturday routine was described by a friend, Stephen Fothergill, in his book The Last Lamplighter: “On Saturday mornings he drifted down to the French pub [The York Minster] where he met Greta and a few cronies. Later he went off in search of the drug dealer from whom he bought his weekly supply of ‘West African weed’.”

The accident occurred at approx 5:30pm at the south end of Park Lane approximately opposite Achilles Way on the southbound carriageway. The inquiry assumed Hal was crossing from the East side. Park Lane was being remodelled at the time but this section was similar to the way it was in 2022. The inquiry papers include a map of the location with the position of witnesses. On the opposite side of the road was the fenced works compound with no footway. There was another fatal accident on Park Lane on 29 December 1961 when a woman was killed crossing at the former location of a pedestrian crossing. Pedestrians continued to be involved in accidents on Park Lane throughout the 1960s as not everyone used the new subways.

At the time of Hal's accident the traffic was very heavy with several lanes of traffic, it was drizzling and dusk or dark though the carriageway was well lit. Hal was knocked down by an E Type Jaguar registration number 773 ELH driven by Mr Ivor McLean. In his witness statement Mr McLean said:

"I had just left the last set of traffic lights southbound towards Hyde Park Corner and had just changed into second gear moving forward at a speed of about 10 to 15 mph. Suddenly I felt a bump at the front nearside of my car."

The windscreen of the car was broken, the bonnet dented and Hal was thrown into the air, somersaulted, fell on his back in the road and hit his head.

The driver stopped as did the car behind which contained two people. These three plus a pedestrian. who heard but did not see the accident, all went to help and all gave evidence at the HO inquiry.

The driver of the car behind, Mr Peter Callender, said in his witness statement:

"...I was driving my vehicle south along Park Lane towards Hyde Park Corner at approximately 10/15 mph. I was following an 'E' type Jaguar at a distance of approximately 25/30 yards."

An ambulance was called and Hal was taken to St. George's Hospital which in 1962 was at the south end of Park Lane.

Accounts differ as to whether Hal smelt of drink. The car driver wasn't sure and the other witnesses and the ambulance staff said he didn't. The Police said he did. The HO inquiry concluded that he was "not the worse for drink".

At the hospital Hal was examined by Dr Brian Toone and his head was X-Rayed. Whilst Hal was in the casualty department a male nurse, Peter Bennett, checked Hal's pockets and his haversack, described as being a wartime gas mask bag (similar to a modern courier bag) for identification. The haversack contained a half bottle of Teacher's whiskey of which approx one third had been consumed and a quantity of a herbal mixture wrapped in two packets of newspaper. In Hal's pocket was a small tin containing the same mixture. The Met Police laboratory later assessed the mixture to be a total of 165 grains (10.7 grams) of Indian hemp (marijuana) which was deemed sufficient for 33 cigarettes and was assessed to have a value of £8 5s 0d (equivalent to £154 in 2025).

The police officer who had been sent to the hospital to investigate the personal injury accident was shown the herbal mixture, assessed it as likely to be Indian hemp and arrested Hal.

Due to the quantity of marijuana found the Police thought they had arrested a dealer.

Dr Toone concluded from the X-Ray that there was no fracture of Hal's skull. He also assessed Hal's injuries as comparatively trivial.

Hal was handed over to the police who took him to West End Central police station where he was examined by the police surgeon, Dr James Henderson Peters. Dr Peters died on 12 July 1963 of myocardial ischaemia aged 63 and the inquiry relied on his written records. The inquiry was unwilling to express any view with regard to Dr. Peters actions without him having an opportunity of explaining them. Attempts were made to contact his widow to see if she wished to be legally represented but it was found that she was in transit to Southern Rhodesia, now Zimbabwe, and it was judged that further action was impracticable.

The police failed to complete the correct paperwork so when Hal's friends reported him missing it was not identified that he was in police custody. The police also searched Hal's flat at 21 Bourne Terrace, Paddington without appropriate permission and charged him whilst he was semi-conscious. On all of these points they were criticised by the inquiry.

On the afternoon of Sunday 11 November 1962, Hal was found in the detention room slumped on the floor and he could not be roused. Dr Peters was called and Hal was taken back to St George's Hospital. On arrival, he was examined and no injuries further to those recorded the previous day were recorded. At around 11pm on Monday 12 November 1962, Hal was taken to the Atkinson Morley Hospital which is a specialist in head injuries.

Two operations were performed on him but he died on 23 November 1962 at 10:10pm. He had been kept under police guard until 22 November when the guard was removed at the request of the hospital matron. Independent expert evidence to the inquiry said that Hal's head injuries incurred in the accident were unsurvivable. From the outset, the police were of the view that Hal was either drunk, under the influence of illegal drugs or both. However, no tests for alcohol or drugs are mentioned in the inquiry report or the released Police files.

Meanwhile, Hal's friends, including Greta, had become concerned at his disappearance and reported him as missing on 15 November but this was to a different London police station to the one where Hal had been taken and the failure to follow procedures on arresting someone meant that the fact Hal was in police custody was not identified. Greta's phone number was in Hal's diary as the person to contact in case of an accident but the police did not do this. The Police said that Hal had said he wanted no one to be contacted. The arresting officer claimed not to have seen this diary. The police did copy out names, addresses and telephone numbers, including Greta's, from it

The police at West End Central finally realised that Hal had been reported missing and at 1am on 24 November phoned Mr Cotton who had reported him missing, to say where Hal was. When Mr Cotton phoned the hospital he found that Hal had died the night before

The police also finally found Hals’ diary and phoned Greta, at the same number as Mr Cotton, an hour later.

Hal's friends were suspicious, especially after they had seen his body, and proceeded to speak to as many medical staff who had treated Hal as they could.

Hal was cremated at St Marylebone Cemetery at 9:15 on 8 December 1962. His ashes were removed.

== Inquest and inquiries ==
The inquest was held on 28 November 1962 and 5 December 1962 and recorded the cause of death as contusion of the brain following collision with a motorcar.

Hal's friends approached the solicitor Sydney Silverman MP to take up the case. The matter was passed to an assistant who failed to arrange legal representation at the inquest and told Greta and Mr Cotton to ask for an adjournment in order that proper legal representation could be arranged. The coroner refused to adjourn the inquest. The assistant then left Mr Silverman's firm taking with him all the case documents including Hal's will.

Following a Private Eye article on 9 August 1963. and the wider circulation of the story in the national and regional press including The Times the Met conducted an internal inquiry headed by DS Axon. The Police apologised for mistakes that led to Hal's whereabouts not being recorded correctly. The Met inquiry papers are held at the UK National Archives

In November 1963 Greta sought to have the inquest verdict quashed and for there to be a new inquest. The application was refused

The Met inquiry failed to allay suspicions amongst Hal's supporters and after pressure, including questions in the House of Commons., the Home Office carried out its own private inquiry led by Norman Skelhorn QC. The inquiry had no power to compel the attendance of witnesses or take evidence under oath. Mr Skelhorn heard evidence from seventy-eight witnesses and was satisfied that "all the relevant evidence which was available was put before me"

The inquiry papers were released to the UK National Archives in 1995 and included a manuscript transcript of the questioning of witnesses. The catalogue does record that one group of the inquiry papers, HO 287/562, was missing at transfer but gives no indication of what it might contain. A Freedom of Information request in 2023 stated that "We have searched for this file and can confirm that the Home Office does not have it". There is also a gap in the internal references: HO/287/564 contains inquiry papers A1 to A28 and HO/287/565 contains inquiry papers A30 to A69. There are no documents from Special Branch or the security services in the inquiry papers despite Hal's connections including Malcolm Dunbar and Tomas Harris both of whom also died in disputed circumstances

At the inquiry one of Hal's friends, Marianna Sagovsky, said that Hal was "bad at crossing roads"

The Skelhorn inquiry found that Hal was not subjected to any violence or deliberately maltreated at the hands of the police. It did say that the police failed in their duty of care to Hal and failed to follow proper procedures which would have allowed his friends to find him before he died.

It recommended that searches of premises should only be carried out with the correct authorisation and that the charging of semi or unconscious suspects should cease.

Mr Skelhorn requested that the Home Office paid Greta's costs and this was done.

On 26 March 1964, The Times reported "Woolf not maltreated at Police station".

In his memoirs "Public Prosecutor" published in 1981 Norman Skelhorn wrote:

"I was pleased that the evidence in the Woolf case exonerated the police from any blame for the unfortunate man’s death".

== Private Eye ==
The Woolf case was first brought to public attention in Private Eye edition 43 published on Friday 9 August 1963. The story was picked up by the Sunday Mirror of 11 August 1963 and other national and regional papers followed.

This was the first piece of serious investigative journalism published by Private Eye and it came about almost by accident. Claud Cockburn, the left-wing journalist, was invited to guest edit one issue. Greta Woolf had been trying to get the newspapers interested in the Hal Woolf case without much success. She finally visited Cockburn at his home in Ireland and he decided to include it in Private Eye. The article was published under the headline "Come to Lovely London and find HOW TO BECOME DEAD Without Anyone Knowing How".

The article seems to be based almost entirely on the account of Greta as it matches her evidence to both the police inquiry and the Home Office inquiry.

== Philip Knightley ==
Philip Knightley kept a file on Hal Woolf in a locked cabinet in his office at the Sunday Times. Knightley's archive is held at University of the Arts, London archive. The catalogue contains no entries relating to Hal Woolf.

== Redfern Gallery catalogue, 1929 ==
| Catalogue number | Title |
|---|---|
| 1 | Bastia Harbour, Corsica |
| 2 | Montmarte (Kindly lent by the Countess of Lathom) |
| 3 | Hythe |
| 4 | Place St. André des Arts |
| 5 | Piana, Corsica |
| 6 | Eucalyptus Tree - Corsica |
| 7 | Corte, Corsica |
| 8 | Santa Margharita |
| 9 | Corte - Evening |
| 10 | Calvi, Corsica |
| 11 | Everlasting Flower |
| 12 | Place St. André des Arts |
| 13 | Timber Yard |
| 14 | Tarascon |
| 15 | Marble Arch |
| 16 | Place Blanche |
| 17 | Drury Lane |
| 18 | Kemp Town, Brighton |
| 19 | Piazza, Sienne |
| 20 | Cottage Bedroom |
| 21 | Place Pigalle |
| 22 | Onions |
| 23 | Rue St. Jacques |
| 24 | Wardour Street |
| 25 | Rue de Dragon |
| 26 | Grands Boulevard |
| 27 | San Gonigniano |
| 28 | Assisi |
| 29 | Place de Théâtre |
| 30 | Mamie |
| 31 | Café |
| 32 | Shepherd’s Market |
| 33 | Rue de Bucci, Paris |
| 34 | Ship Street, Brighton |
| 35 | Café - Florence |
| 36 | Les Halles, Paris |
| 37 | Rue de Blagues |
| 38 | Ship Street, Brighton |
| 39 | Danish Girl |
| 40 | The Window Ledge |
| 41 | Chrysanthemums |
| 42 | Seven Dials |
| 43 | Rue de Beaubourg |
| 44 | The Canal, Hythe |
| 45 | Piana |
| 46 | Bastia Harbour |
| 47 | Ponte Vecchio, Florence |
| 48 | Rue St. Jacques |
| 49 | “Le Lapin Agile” |
| 50 | Old Houses - Paris |

== Woodstock Gallery catalogue, 1964 ==
| Catalogue no. | Name | Date | Lent by | Notes |
|---|---|---|---|---|
| 1 | Black Thursday | c1920 | Mrs Grayce Mitchell-Bush | |
| 2 | Window at Oak Cottage | c1929 | Mr & Mrs Ivor Brown | Editor of The Observer |
| 3 | Café, Place du Terte, Paris | c1926 | Miss Teresa Johnstone-Saint | |
| 4 | Rue Beauborg, Paris | | Miss Adrienne Spanier | Watercolour |
| 5 | White Bird | c1947 | | Gouache |
| 6 | Olive Trees in Ibiza | 1936 | | |
| 7 | Self portrait | c1947 | M. Gaston Berlemont | Proprietor of The York Minster |
| 8 | The Canal from Delamere Terrace | 1951 | | |
| 9 | Spring in Corfu | 1938 | | |
| 10 | Street in Cordoba | 1936 | | |
| 11 | Delamere Terrace | 1951 | Lady Audrey Lawrence | |
| 12 | Porchester Square | 1956 | | |
| 13 | Delamere Terrace after demolition | 1950 | | |
| 14 | La Table Vide, Barbizon | 1939 | | |
| 15 | Portrait of a Bavarian Girl | 1935 | | |
| 16 | David | 1947 | | Gouache |
| 17 | Study of Head | 1947 | | Gouache |
| 18 | Dublin | 1956 | | |
| 19 | Demolition | | | |
| 20 | Cafe Anne | 1938 | | |
| 21 | St Tropez | | | Watercolour |
| 22 | Fish | | | Gouache |
| 23 | Delamere Terrace | | Mrs Greta Woolf | Oil Painting, Chessboard painted on back |
| 24 | Portrait of Catherine Morley | | Mrs Greta Woolf | |
| 25 | Paris Street | c1929 | | Watercolour |
| 26 | Corsican Farm | c1927 | Mrs Monica Ewer | Watercolour |
| 27 | Clerkenwell Square | 1932 | Mrs Mabel Lethbridge | Watercolour |
| 28 | Portrait of Esther Biss | | Lt. Col. Amyas Biss | |
| 29 | Place de l'Odeon | | Mrs Peter Henderson | Watercolour |
| 30 | Boat building in Ibiza | | Mrs Ursula Blake | |
| 31 | Hotel du Midi | | Mrs Nancy Aarons | Watercolour |
| 32 | Corsica | 1927 | Mr & Mrs Harry Marks | Watercolour |
| 33 | Farmyard | 1925 | | |
| 34 | Regents Park | 1925 | Mrs Stanley Spurling | |
| 35 | Billiards | | Mrs M Tudor-Godwin of New York | |
| 36 | Romance | | James Proudfoot Esq | Watercolour |
| 37 | Madonna | | Group Capt. E M Gillan | |
| 38 | Plaza in Palma, Mallorca | 1935 | | |
| 39 | Cagnes-sur-mer | 1936 | | |
| 40 | Polensa, Mallorca | 1935 | | |
| 41 | Palma | 1935 | | |
| 42 | Cornice d'Or | | | |
| 43 | Finchley Road | 1931 | | |
| 44 | Cacti | | Mr & Mrs Michael Hankinson | |
| 45 | Portrait of Francine | | | |
| 46 | Portrait of Josephine | | Mrs Francis Winham | |
| 47 | Portrait of the first Mrs A R Thomas | | | |
| 48 | The Curator of Antiquities, British Museum | 1929 | Mr W M Nathan | |
| 49 | Bakehouse in Mallorca | | Mrs Peggy Dowdall | |
| 50 | Pimlico | | Mr Finbar Gibbings | |
| 51 | Portrait of Peter | | Mr Peter Bennett | |
| 52 | Cordoba | | | |
| 53 | Place St Michel | | | |
| 54 | Ibiza | | | |
| 55 | Murcia | | | |
| 56 | Paris Street | 1939 | | Watercolour |
| 57 | Henley Bridge | | | |
| 58 | Paris Window | | | |
| 59 | Portrait of Charles Couchman | | | |
| 60 | Palma Yacht Club | | | Watercolour |
| 61 | Chelsea Bridge | | | Watercolour |
| 62 | Promenade | | | Watercolour |
| 63 | London Street | | | Watercolour |
| 64 | Brighton Pier | | | Watercolour |
| 65 | Bridge | | | |
| 66 | Woman's Head | | | Charcoal drawing |
| 67 | Study of building thru' trees | | | |
| 68 | Peasant in Corfu | | | |
| 69 | Paris river | | | |
| 70 | Ivinghoe | | | |
| 71 | Street in Palma | | | |
| 72 | Village | 1935 | | |
| 73 | Street in Corfu | | | |
| 74 | Country House and gardens | | | |
| 75 | Farmyard study | | | |
| 76 | House on hillock, Corfu | | Mr G C Horn | |
| 77 | Man and girl on verandah | | | |
| 78 | Defence de bagner | 1946 | | Watercolour |
| 79 | Lambeth | 1938 | | Watercolour |
| 80 | Paris | 1925 | Mr Jose Bentwich of Jerusalem | Watercolour |
| | Eleven miscellaneous sketches in portfolio | | | |

== Bibliography ==
- Buckman, David (2006). Artists in Britain since 1945. Vol. 2: M to Z. Bristol: Art Dictionaries Ltd. ISBN 978-0-9532609-5-9.
- Davenport, Richard (2013). An English Affair. London: Harper Collins. ISBN 978-0-00-743584-5.
- Feaver, William (2019). The Lives of Lucian Freud - Youth. London: Bloomsbury. ISBN 978-1-4088-5093-0.
- Fothergill, Stephen (2000). The Last Lamplighter. London Magazines Editions. ISBN 0-904388-83-2.
- Grigg, Mary (1965). The Challenor Affair. London: Penguin Special.
- Ingrams, Richard (1971). The Life and Times of Private Eye 1961-1971. London: Penguin Books. ISBN 0-14-003357-2.
- Skelhorn, Norman (1981). Public Prosecutor. London: Harrap. ISBN 0-245-53763-5.
- Skelhorn, Norman (1964). Report on Inquiry into the Action of the Metropolitan Police in relation to the Case of Mr. Herman Woolf (Report). London: HMSO.
- Trevellyan, Julian (1957). Indigo Days. London: MacGibbon & Kee.
