= People's Theatre, Newcastle upon Tyne =

Coordinates: 54.9904°N 1.5848°W

People's Theatre
- PTAG
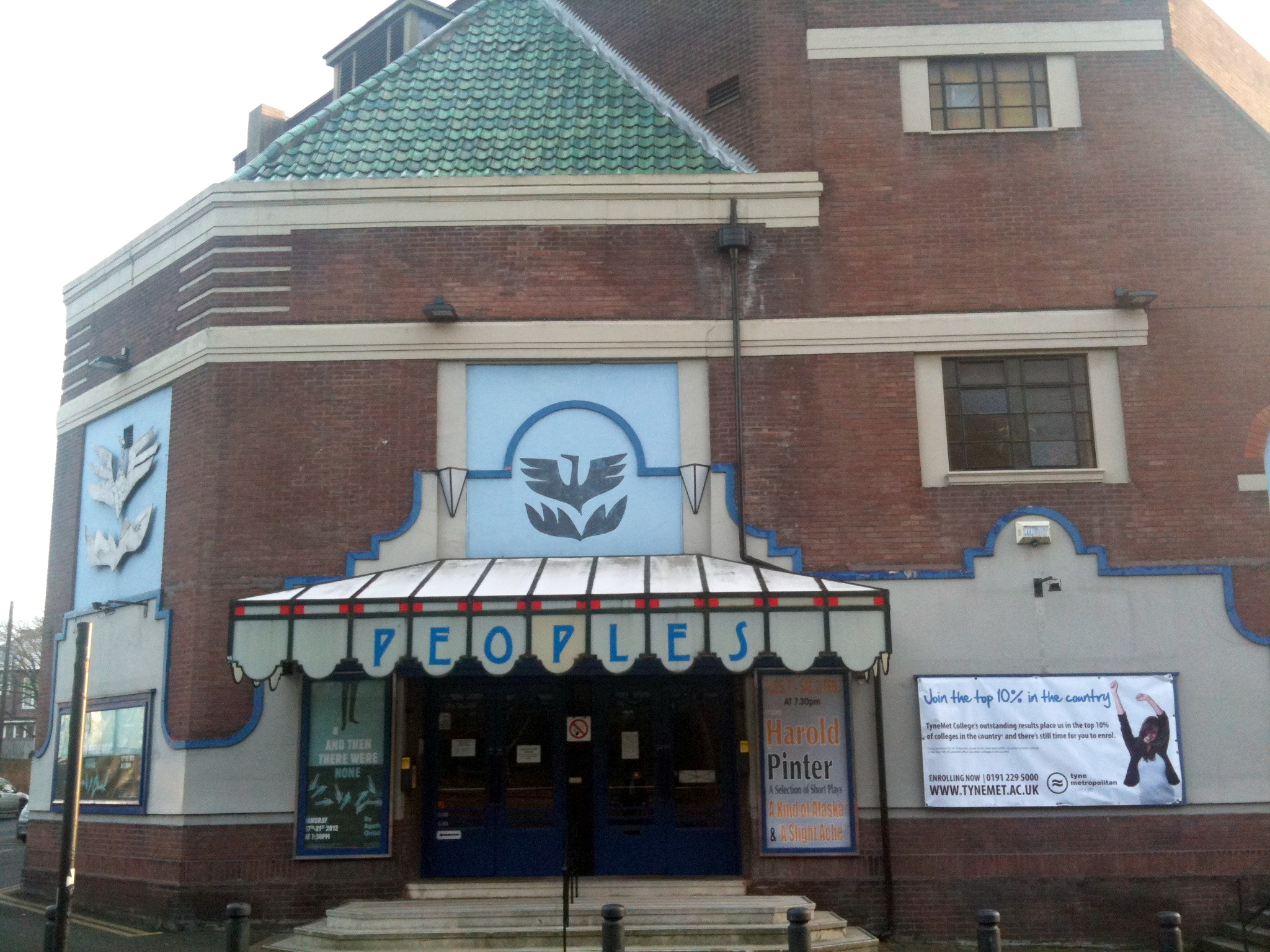
- The main entrance before the 2017 refurbishment
- Interactive map of People's Theatre
- Address: Stephenson Road, Heaton, Newcastle upon Tyne, NE6 5QF; Newcastle upon Tyne; U.K.
- Owner: People's Theatre Trust.
- Capacity: 380

Construction
- Opened: 1911 (at Percy Street); 1915 (at Royal Arcade); 1930 (Rye Hill); 1962 (at Stephenson Road)

Website
- www.peoplestheatre.co.uk

The People's Theatre is an amateur theatre in Newcastle upon Tyne, England. Originally located in the city centre, the People's Theatre moved to its current site, adjacent to the Coast Road in Heaton, in 1962. It shows approximately 13 productions a year including a full-scale family pantomime.

== History ==
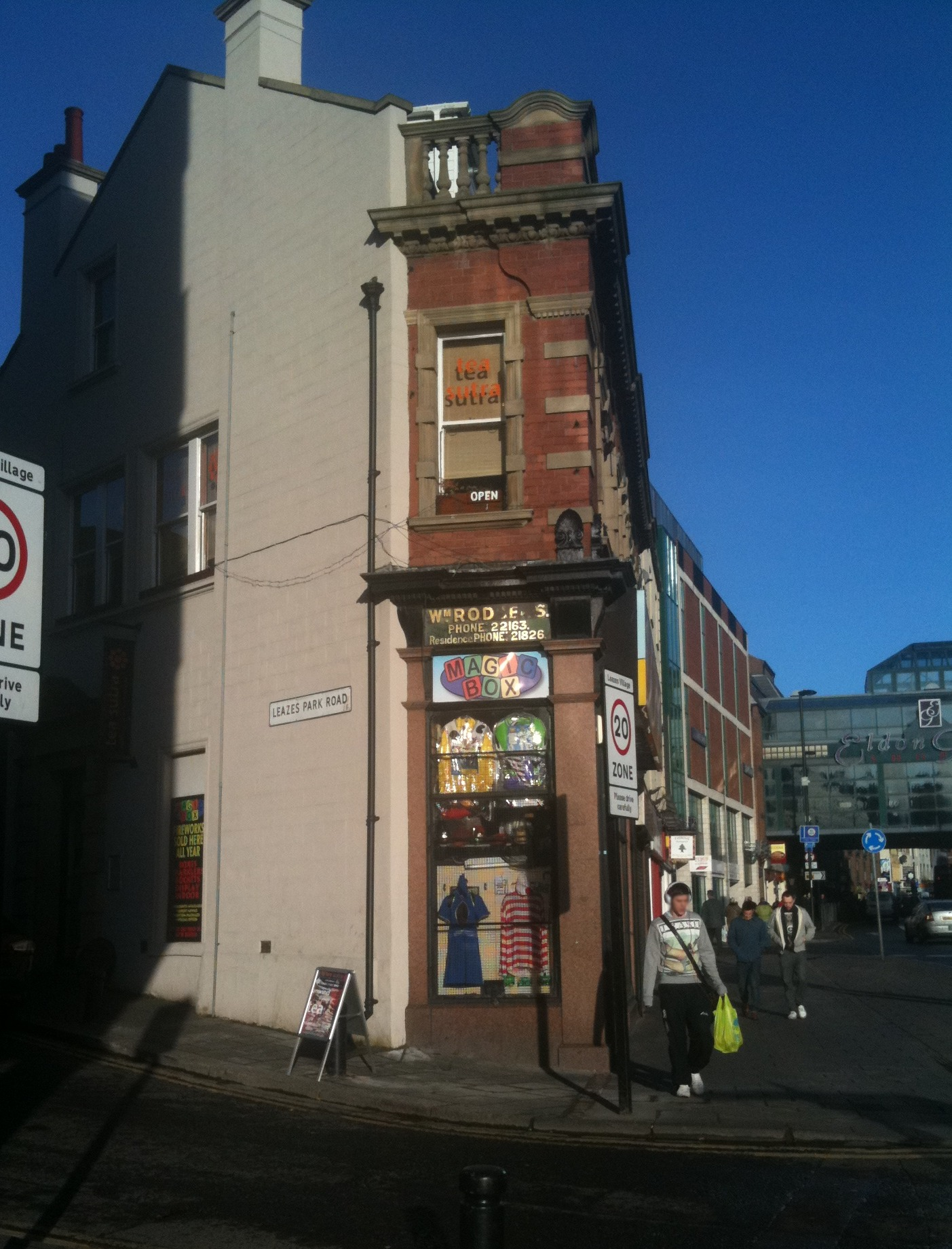
The Clarion Dramatic Society was formed in a building on the junction of Leazes Park Road and Percy Street

The People's Theatre originated within the Newcastle branch of the former British Socialist Party. At that time (1911) money was tight and it was suggested that "The Drama" may be a source. A Double-Bill of "Pot Luck" and "The Bishop's Candlesticks," each having impeccably socialist credentials, was produced and raised nearly 15 shillings (75p) for the funds. It was decided that putting on plays could be a good way of raising money their political activities, and so they went ahead. It was decided that they would affiliate to the Clarion Movement. One of the theatre's key co-founders was Colin Veitch (1881–1938), captain of Newcastle United in their Edwardian heyday. Plays were originally staged under the name of the Clarion Dramatic Society, one of many so-called 'Clarion' societies then existing within the BSP (such as the Clarion Cycling Club and the Clarion Vocal Union). Its first premises were in the BSP's rooms on the first floor of a building at the corner of Leazes Terrace and Percy Street in Newcastle city centre. Their first performance was of The Bishop's Candlesticks (a drama based on Victor Hugo's Les Misérables) in July 1911. But as Norman Veitch (one of the co-founders and Colin Veitch's brother) later remarked: 'If we're going to murder plays, let's murder the best'. In September they performed Bernard Shaw's The Shewing-Up of Blanco Posnet, although it had been banned by the Lord Chamberlain. Thus began the People's Theatre's close association with Shaw, whose plays combined popular appeal with a social message that appealed to the Fabian political sentiments of the Clarion Society members. These theatrical productions became so popular that the dramatic society started to cast their net wider in their choice of plays to include William Shakespeare and genres such as comedy. This led to friction with the BSP, so the Clarion group started to look for new premises. The theatre remained active throughout World War I, during which it formally split from the BSP and moved to the Royal Arcade, Pilgrim Street in 1915.

In 1920, Norman Veitch went to Birmingham to meet Bernard Shaw and the great man subsequently came to Newcastle to see the Clarion production of his play Man and Superman in 1921. After this, Shaw offered in future a percentage of royalty terms instead of performance fees - a generous gesture. The theatre had by now changed its name to the People's Theatre and went on to give the first provincial performance of Shaw's Heartbreak House. In 1926, the theatre gave the British premiere of Stravinsky's The Soldier's Tale and Rutland Boughton himself came to conduct his popular The Immortal Hour.

In 1929, the People's acquired new premises at Rye Hill in the west end of the city, where they converted an old chapel into a theatre in which they would stay until 1962, staging over 500 productions. During this period the theatre was visited by a number of well-known figures from the theatrical world, including Sybil Thorndike in 1931. In March 1933, J. B. Priestley visited the theatre whilst travelling around the country gathering material for his book English Journey; in it, he writes at some length about watching a rehearsal of The Trojan Women. Bernard Shaw visited for a second time in 1936, upon which occasion he made what was to be his last speech from a stage. He remarked: "This being my last speech in the theatre, I like it to be this one." Both Shaw and Dame Sybil took part in a BBC radio programme about the People's Theatre produced by Cecil McGivern an ex-People's member, in 1939. In this programme, Shaw opened his remarks with the words 'I like this People's Theatre.' The theatre remained open and producing plays throughout World War II. It gave the public premiere of one of Shaw's very last works, Farfetched Fables, in 1951.

Throughout the 1940s and 1950s the People's continued to perform drama by playwrights whose work at that time would have otherwise been unperformed in northeast England, or, in some cases, anywhere else. The People's staged the World Premiere of Seán O'Casey's play Cock-a-Doodle Dandy in 1949. Another premiere was that of W. H. Auden's The Ascent of F6. Auden was in Newcastle at the time, and his friend, the Newcastle poet Michael Roberts wrote the programme notes. Other such writers included: John Whiting, Harold Pinter, Eugène Ionesco, Samuel Beckett, John Arden, John Osborne, Ugo Betti and Fritz Hochwälder; many of these productions were regional, if not national premieres of works by playwrights not yet as universally recognised or as popular as they would later become.

By 1955 the People's was beginning to outgrow its Rye Hill premises, and theatre chairman Arthur Kay enrolled the help of Peggy Ashcroft and John Gielgud to launch a building appeal fund. Within five years, this allowed the purchase of the former Lyric Cinema in Heaton and a new arts centre opened there in September 1962 with Shaw's Man and Superman. In the same year, the Young People's Theatre, for children aged 11 to 17 was founded, led by People's Theatre members. In 1967 the theatre produced the British Premiere of Arthur Miller's After the Fall. In 1969 Peter Brook came to see the famous Kathkali Dancers. The diamond jubilee of the theatre was celebrated in 1971 with a performance of Shaw's The Philanderer. In 1987 the Royal Shakespeare Company used the theatre as part of their Newcastle season. In 2011 the theatre celebrated its centenary with Shaw's Pygmalion.

In 2014, plans were announced to refurbish the theatre and to create a study space which could be used at the same time as performances in the main auditorium. The Arts Council England awarded the theatre £100,000, with £1.5m raised by the theatre itself. The theatre reopened in December 2016 for its annual pantomime.

== The People's logo ==
This has traditionally been a Phoenix, no doubt reflecting the many times when the theatre had risen from near-disaster to a new life. In the 1960s, as part of the fund-raising campaign for a new home, it was decided that the old design, probably dating from the 1920s, needed modernising. Local graphic designer Peter Reed donated the new design, which is still in use - see the picture. When the old and now empty Rye Hill theatre burnt down, James Garbutt a People's actor and talented artist, salvaged some charred boards from the old stage to create a replica of the new logo to hang in the Greenroom.

In 2017, to go along with a major refurbishment of the Heaton site, a new logo was adopted.

== Notable former members ==
A number of former People's Theatre members have gone on to find success and fame in the professional theatre. These include: Alan Browning, James Garbutt, Fred Pearson, Margaret Jackman, Jack Shepherd, Kevin Whately, Ralph Watson, Tom Goodman-Hill and Andrea Riseborough. Other former People's members who have gone on to find success in related fields include pop star Neil Tennant (singer-songwriter in the Pet Shop Boys), comedian Ross Noble and BBC Radio producer Ian Gardhouse.

== People's Theatre Arts Group ==
For many years, the People's had been closely associated with the Tyneside Music Society and the Tyneside Film Society, both of which hired various venues in Newcastle for their monthly performances. Both societies joined the People's Theatre in the move to its new home. The former cinema's screen and projection facilities were retained and the conversion included a purpose-built art gallery in the theatre bar. So theatre, film, music and art operated together under the People's Theatre Arts Group banner.

=== The People's Play Award ===
The theatre also hosts the People's Play Award. It is a biennial playwriting competition originally co-hosted with New Writing North in 1992 (with a six year break between 2013 and 2019, and the 2021 competition was cancelled due to the Covid-19 pandemic), but has solely been a People's Theatre competition since 2019. Its object is to encourage writing for live theatre from writers living in the north of England. The prize for the bi-annual award was originally £500 (now £1000) and a production of the winning play by the People's Theatre. Originally, the 2nd and 3rd placed plays would receive a rehearsed reading at the People's Theatre, however, this practice has now ended.

As of May 2025, there have been fourteen People's Plays winners.

==== Previous winners ====
- 1993: "The Eyes of Another Race" by David Farne
- 1995: "Lord of the North" by Sidney L. Charlton
- 1997: "A Rhyme for Orange" by Peter Straughan
- 1999: "The Big Marrow" by Carina Rodney
- 2001: "Bloodlines" by Norrene Rees
- 2003: "Sticky Fingers" by Tony Glover
- 2005: "My Mam Was An Ice-cream Blonde" by Alison Carr
- 2007: "Lucky Numbers" by Mike Yeaman
- 2009: "Pig Stew" by Fiona Veitch-Smith
- 2011: "Ersatz" by Kevan Ogden
- 2013: "In My Father's House" by Patrick Robertson
- 2019: "Voltemand and Cornelius Are Joyfully Returned" by Paul Vates
- 2023: "Not From Concentrate" by P. W. Sowerby
- 2025: "Sides" by Alex Joynes
