= Breon O'Casey =

British painter

- Born: 30 April 1928; London, England
- Died: 22 May 2011 (aged 83)
- Occupations: Artist and craftsman
- Spouse: Doreen Corscadden (1961–?)
- Children: 3
- Parents: Seán O'Casey; Eileen O'Casey

Breon O'Casey (30 April 1928 – 22 May 2011) was a British artist associated with the St Ives School.

O'Casey was born in London to actress Eileen and playwright Seán O'Casey. He was educated at Dartington Hall School in Devon and, following his national service duty, attended the Anglo-French Art School, a small school in St John's Wood, London, based on the French model. He was an apprentice to Denis Mitchell and Dame Barbara Hepworth, which informed his own later career. He moved to Cornwall, initially working in the artists' colony of St Ives.

Although primarily a painter, he also made jewelry.
