= Leslie Hancock (cricketer) =

English cricketer and British Army officer (1899–1944)

Personal information
- Full name: Leslie Frank Hancock
- Born: 25 October 1899; Jamnagar, Bombay Presidency, British India
- Died: 12 July 1944 (aged 44); Maupertus-sur-Mer, Normandy, France
- Batting: Right-handed
- Bowling: Right-arm medium-fast

Domestic team information
- Years: Team
- 1926: Marylebone Cricket Club

Career statistics
Competition	First-class
Matches	2
Runs scored	24
Batting average	12.00
100s/50s	–/–
Top score	23
Balls bowled	54
Wickets	1
Bowling average	24.00
5 wickets in innings	–
10 wickets in match	–
Best bowling	1/4
Catches/stumpings	3/–
- Source: Cricinfo, 19 January 2021

Leslie Frank Hancock OBE (25 October 1899 – 12 July 1944) was an English first-class cricketer and British Army officer.

Hancock was born at Jamnagar in British India to a British Indian Army major. He was educated in England at Cheltenham College, deciding upon the completion of his education to take a career in the military. Going up to the Royal Military College, he graduated into the Royal Engineers as a second lieutenant in July 1921, before gaining the rank of lieutenant in July 1923. He played first-class cricket twice for the Marylebone Cricket Club (MCC) in 1926 against Wales and Cambridge University, with both matches played at Lord's. He scored 24 runs in his two matches, in addition to taking a single wicket with his right-arm medium-fast bowling, that of Wales' Cyril Rowland.

He was granted the temporary rank of captain while serving as an adjutant with the Territorial Army in October 1929, later gaining the rank in full in July 1932. Hancock later served in the Second World War with the Royal Engineers, rising to the rank of lieutenant colonel. In the aftermath of the Normandy Landings in June 1944, Hancock commanded engineers constructing advanced landing grounds (ALG). While overseeing the construction of the Royal Air Force ALG B-12 at Ellon, Hancock was killed when the jeep he was travelling in struck a landmine near Maupertus-sur-Mer on 12 July. His body was buried shortly thereafter at the Bayeux war cemetery. He was survived by his wife, the actress Ellen Pollock, with whom he had one son. He was posthumously made an OBE in the 1945 New Year Honours for his services during the war.
