= Malcolm Dunbar =

British volunteer in the Spanish Civil War (1912–1963)

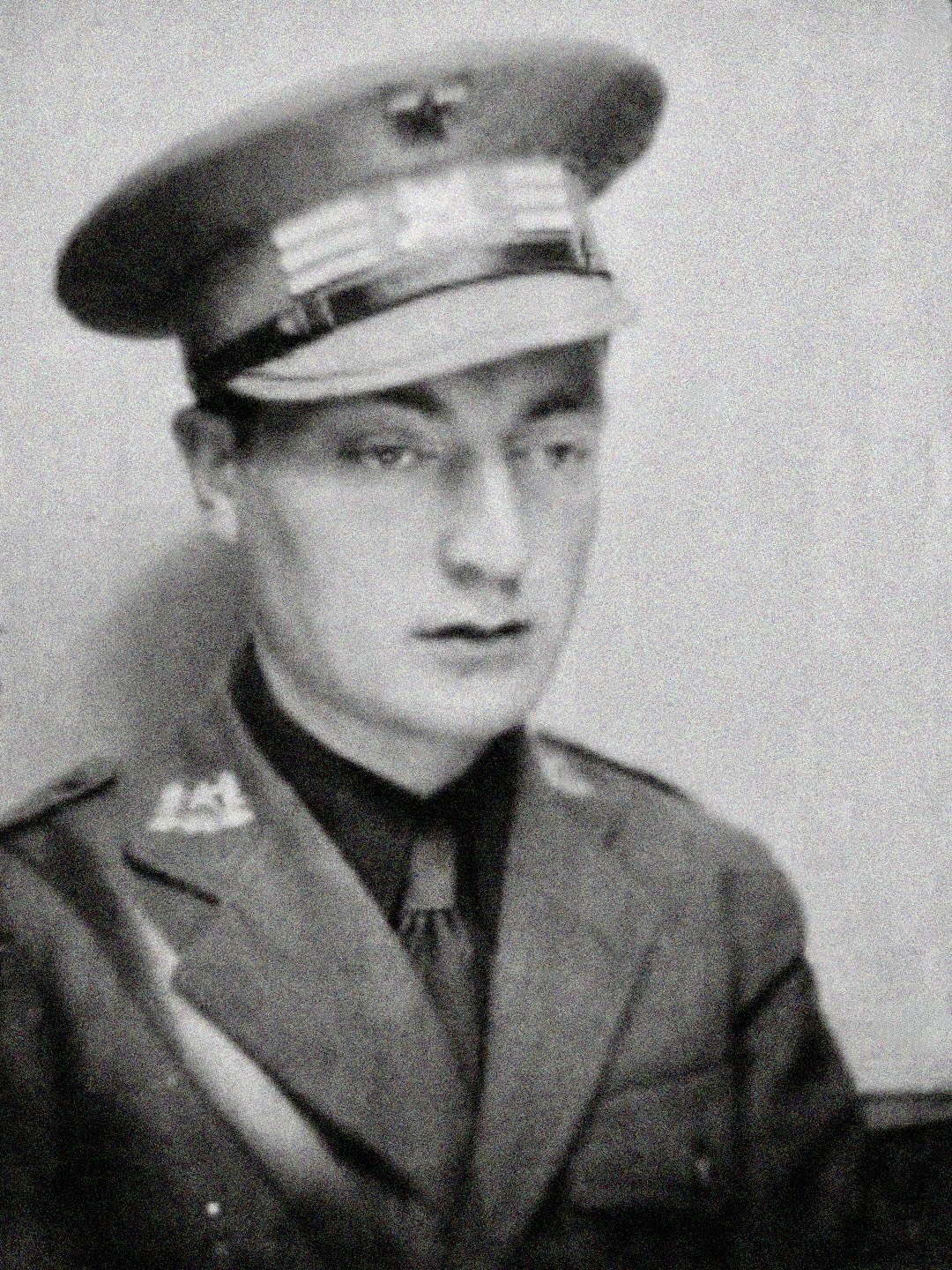
Malcolm Dunbar in Spain c. 1937–1938

Ronald Malcolm (Michael) Loraine Dunbar (29 February 1912 – July 1963) was a British anti-fascist volunteer soldier who served as the chief of staff of the XV International Brigade in the Spanish Civil War, and later worked in the Labour Research Department.

== Early life ==
Dunbar was born on 29 February 1912 at Belle Vue Lodge in Paignton, Devon; son of Sir Loraine Geddes Dunbar, a banker of independent means, and his wife Lady Liola Violet Dunbar. He was educated at Repton School, Derbyshire (1925–1930), and Trinity College, Cambridge (1930–1933), graduating with BA Hons. Whilst at Cambridge, Dunbar is reported to have been part of an elite set that included the infamous double agent Kim Philby.

=== Early working life ===
Following his graduation, Dunbar worked as journalist and photographer. He was commissioned by some of the leading ballet companies of the day – positions often facilitated by his mother. It was whilst working with Ballet Rambert that he met and forged a life-long friendship with the famous ballerina Thérèse Langfield. During this time, Dunbar showed an interest in left-wing political ideas and a dislike for fascism, marching against Oswald Mosley's British Fascists in east London, in October 1936.

== Spanish Civil War ==
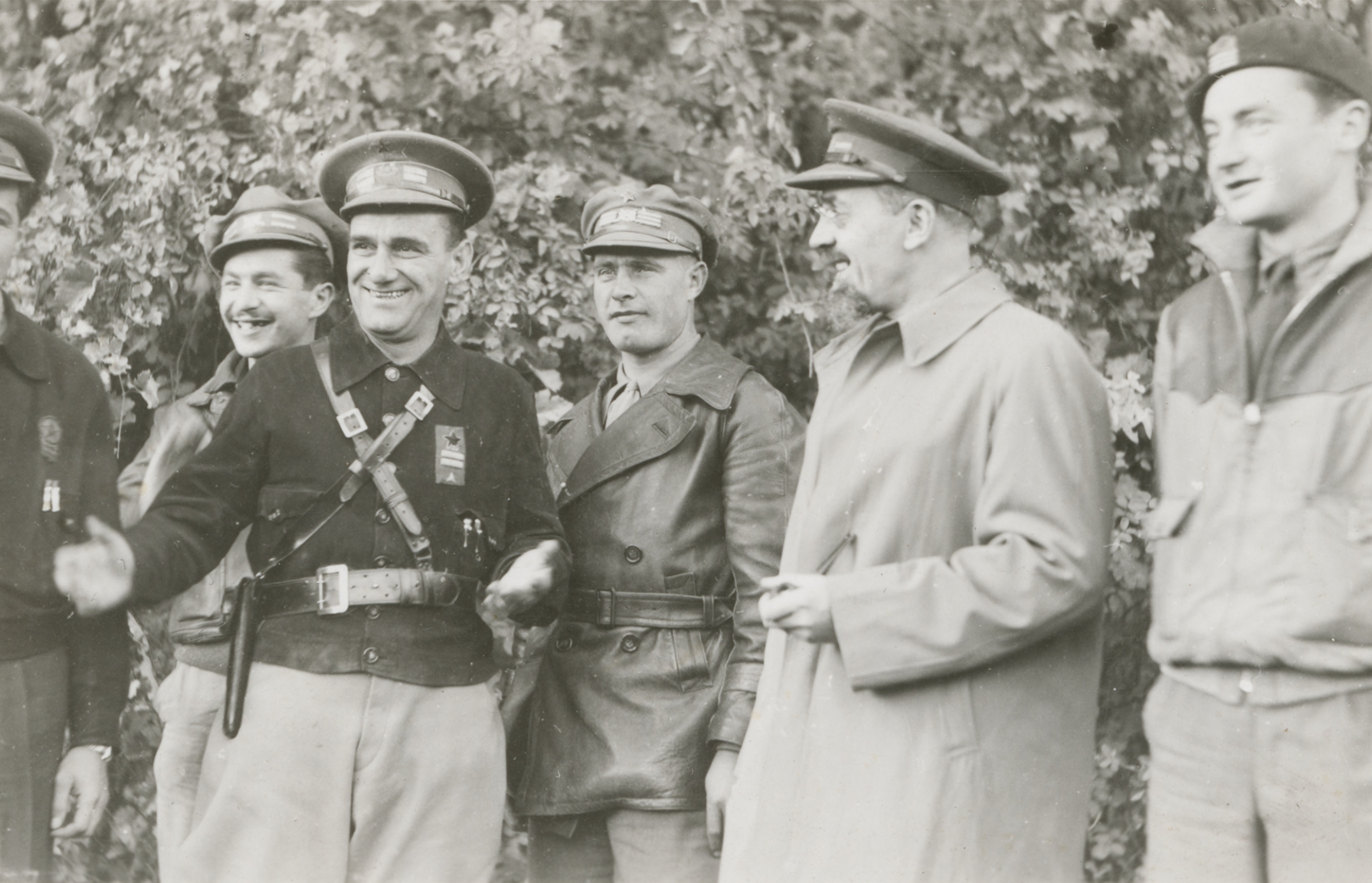
Dunbar (far right) alongside XV International Brigade commander Vladimir Ćopić and others, November 1937

Following the outbreak of civil war in Spain in July 1936, Dunbar left London to join the anti-fascists on 5 January 1937. Once in Spain, Dunbar undertook two weeks training before being sent to the front line. He first saw action at the Battle of Jarama on 12 February 1937. As a new recruit, Dunbar had enlisted as a 'soldado' (private) but by 15 February he had been made group leader of the battalion. He continued in this role until his arm was injured in an attack against the Fascists in mid-January 1938.

Dunbar recuperated from his wound at Colmenar, Quintanar, Alcazar and Murcia before moving to Benicàssim by 22 February. There, Dunbar was elected partially responsible for the English-speaking front at the military hospital Villa Ralph Fox in Benicassim. He remained at the villa until 10 March, when he returned to Albacete. Finding the 16th Battalion quartermaster unable to command his men, Dunbar took the opportunity to return to the Jarama Front. After the quartermaster returned, Dunbar was attached to the battalion HQ in the capacity of interpreter. After another three weeks, he was sent back to Albacete and the officer school.

Dunbar was appointed as chief of staff for the 15th International Brigade during the Battle of the Ebro in July 1938. Dunbar was demobilized in December 1938 having served 23 months. Dunbar never gave any interviews on his time in Spain and information on him has always been fairly scarce, despite his high rank and illustrious record.

== Second World War ==
During the Second World War Dunbar served in the British Army, but never rose above the rank of sergeant, adding fuel to claims that veterans of the Spanish war were being discriminated against. Nye Bevan cited him in support of a motion to censure the Churchill government in 1942.

"The Prime Minister must realise that in this country there is a taunt on everyone's lips that if Rommel had been in the British Army he would still have been a sergeant ... There is a man in the British Army who flung 150,000 men across the Ebro in Spain, Michael Dunbar. He is at present a sergeant ... He was Chief of Staff in Spain, he won the Battle of the Ebro, and he is a sergeant."

Bevan may have confused the XV brigade with the Republican XV Army Corps. Dunbar served under Pedro Mateo Merino commander of the 42nd international division which was under the command of Mañuel Tagüeña of XV Army Corps. Dunbar was thus a brigade commander of thousands not an entire army corps comprising 150,000

It has been suggested that Dunbar was recommended for a commission, but rejected it himself to remain with his unit.

Dunbar served in the Royal Horse Artillery and won the Military Medal.

== Postwar, and death ==
He was a friend of the British artist Hal Woolf who died in Police custody in London in 1962 following a road traffic accident. He had met him and Hal's ex-wife Greta at the York Minster pub on the day of the accident.

He later worked in the Labour Research Department until, in July 1963, having apparently removed all identification from his clothing, he walked into the sea at Milford-on-Sea, near Bournemouth. According to Richard Baxell although this looks like a clear case of suicide, Vincent Brome pointed out in Legions of Babel, his (now out of print) history of the International Brigades, that the coroner declared an open verdict at the inquest rather than declaring his death to have been suicide. This, and Dunbar's alleged relationship with the Cambridge spy, Kim Philby, have led to persistent rumours of official cover-ups and Secret Service skulduggery.

Following his death, Malcolm Dunbar's papers were saved by Thérèse Langfield, whose partner contacted Richard Baxell. In June 2016, Baxell handed over the mass of material to the Bishopsgate Institute in London. The collection includes: Spanish Civil War documents, including papers regarding his service in the 15th International Brigade, 1937–1939; photographs, 1937–1939; papers and correspondence, 1936–1963; membership cards and certificates (UK), including membership of the Communist Party of Great Britain, 1912–1949.
