= Arthur and the Acetone =

1936 satirical play by George Bernard Shaw

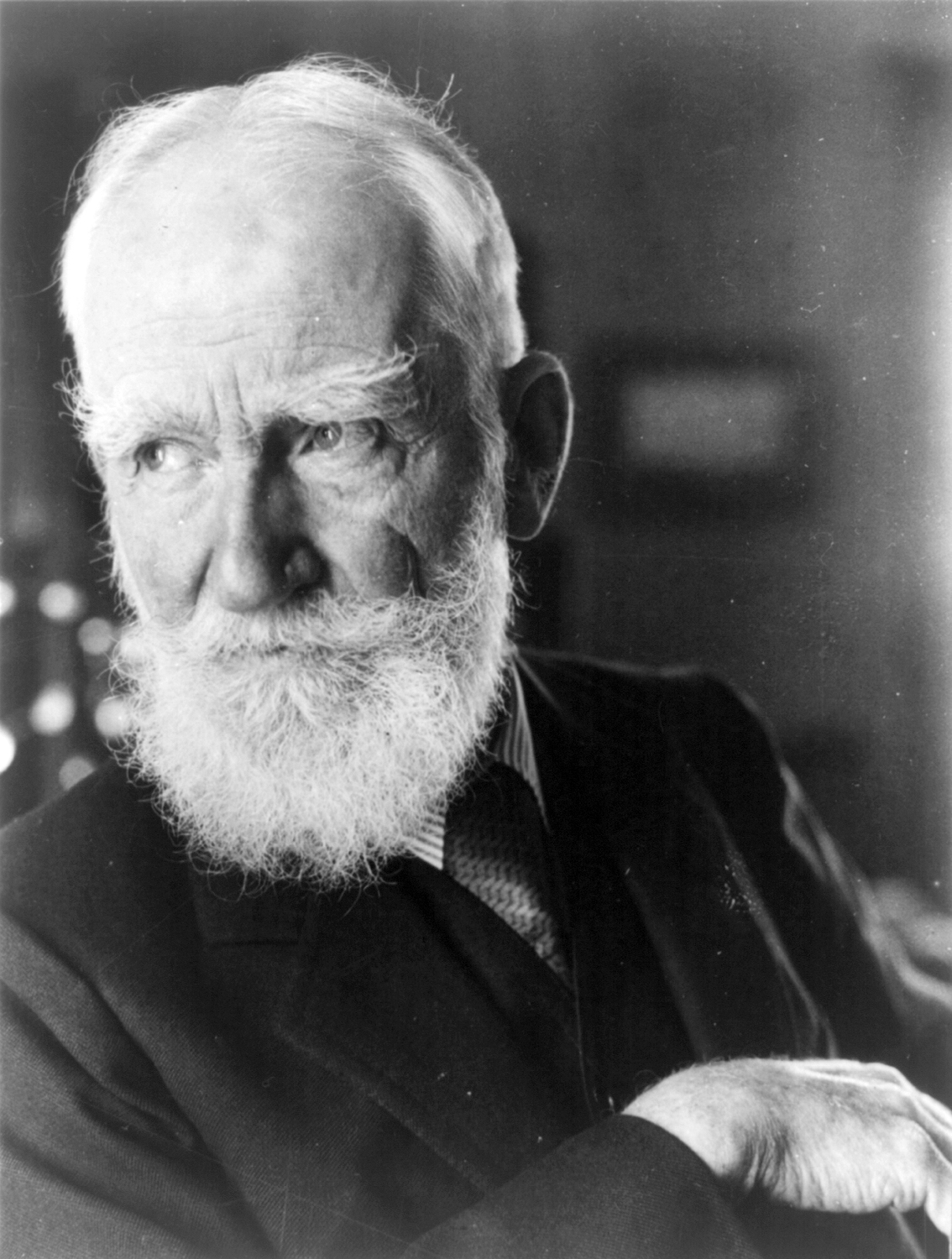
- Written by: George Bernard Shaw
- Original language: English
- Subject: Chaim Weizmann gets Arthur Balfour to give him Jerusalem
- Genre: satire
- Setting: Whitehall

Premiere
- Date premiered: May 18, 2015
- Place premiered: Gingold Theatrical Group

Arthur and the Acetone (1936) is a satirical playlet by George Bernard Shaw which dramatises an imaginary conversation between the Zionist Chaim Weizmann and the British Foreign Secretary Arthur Balfour, which Shaw presents as the "true" story of how the Balfour Declaration came into being.

The playlet finally made its performance debut in 2015 under the direction of David Staller during Gingold Theatrical Group's Project Shaw series.

== Background ==
In 1936 a Special Commission created by the left-wing group the "Independent Labour Forty" had written a report about the 1917 Balfour declaration, which had committed the British government to bring about a Jewish homeland in Palestine after World War I. The Special Commission concluded that the plan was part of an Imperialist strategy to control the Middle East by promoting support for the British Empire among Jews and obtaining "Jewish finance" for the war effort, with a long term purpose of securing access to India and to Middle Eastern oil.

Shaw thought that this explanation attributed far too much Machiavellian brilliance to Balfour, and proposed his own alternative account, represented in the playlet. Shaw says that the declaration was extracted by Weizmann for his contribution to the war effort, in particular his help as a chemist in finding new ways to manufacture acetone cheaply. This claim was in circulation at the time, as it had been expressed by David Lloyd George in his Memoirs, published in 1933.

== Plot ==
Act 1: Balfour is appalled by the cost of the war, especially the need for acetone to make cordite. His attache says that there is a chemist who might be able to help, but unfortunately he is a Jew—and from Manchester. Balfour says that prejudice must be put to one side.

Act 2: Weizmann arrives. Balfour says they need more acetone. Weizmann says he can get it, if Balfour gives him Jerusalem. Balfour agrees, while insisting that the Holy Land as a whole "belongs to the Church of England".

Act 3: Shaw reads about the Balfour declaration, and predicts it will create "another Belfast".

== Publication ==
The playlet was published in The New Leader on 29 November 1936. Shaw later wrote a similar playlet about the origin of party politics entitled The British Party System. A Jewish chemist based on Weizmann is portrayed in similar terms in Shaw's later play Farfetched Fables.
