= Cock-a-Doodle Dandy =

1949 play by Seán O'Casey

- Written by: Seán O'Casey

Premiere
- Date premiered: 1949

Cock-a-Doodle Dandy is a 1949 play by Irish dramatist Seán O'Casey. Regarded by O'Casey as his best play, this is a darkly comic fantasy in which a magic cockerel appears in the parish of Nyadnanave and forces the characters to make choices about the way they live their lives. It is a parable of mid-century Irish rural life, symbolising the struggle between repression and liberty. Initially it was regarded as anti-Catholic and was banned from professional public performance in the UK by the Lord Chamberlain. It was also suppressed in Ireland and the US.

== In performance ==
The World premiere of the play took place at the People's Theatre, Newcastle upon Tyne in 1949. This performance was reviewed in the Irish Times newspaper on 14 December 1949. Under the headline "A Play to Arouse both Anger and Pity", it was described as "a performance of infinitely better quality than I had expected to lie in the capacity of mere Anglo-Saxons, unlearned in the tricky inflexions of O'Casey's Nyadnanave."

The British premiere was at the Edinburgh Festival on 7 September 1959. It was performed by The English Stage Company and directed by George Devine.

== Characters ==
- The Cock
- Michael Marthraun
- Sailor Mahan
- Lorna
- Loreleen
- Marion
- Shanaar
- First rough fellow
- Second rough fellow
- Father Domineer
- The Sargeant
- A Mayor
- Julia
- Jack
- Julia's Father
- A Porter
- One-eyed Larry
- A Mace-bearer
- The Bellman
- The Messenger

== Sources ==
- Banham, Martin, ed. 1998. The Cambridge Guide to Theatre. Cambridge: Cambridge UP. ISBN 0-521-43437-8.
