= The British Party System =

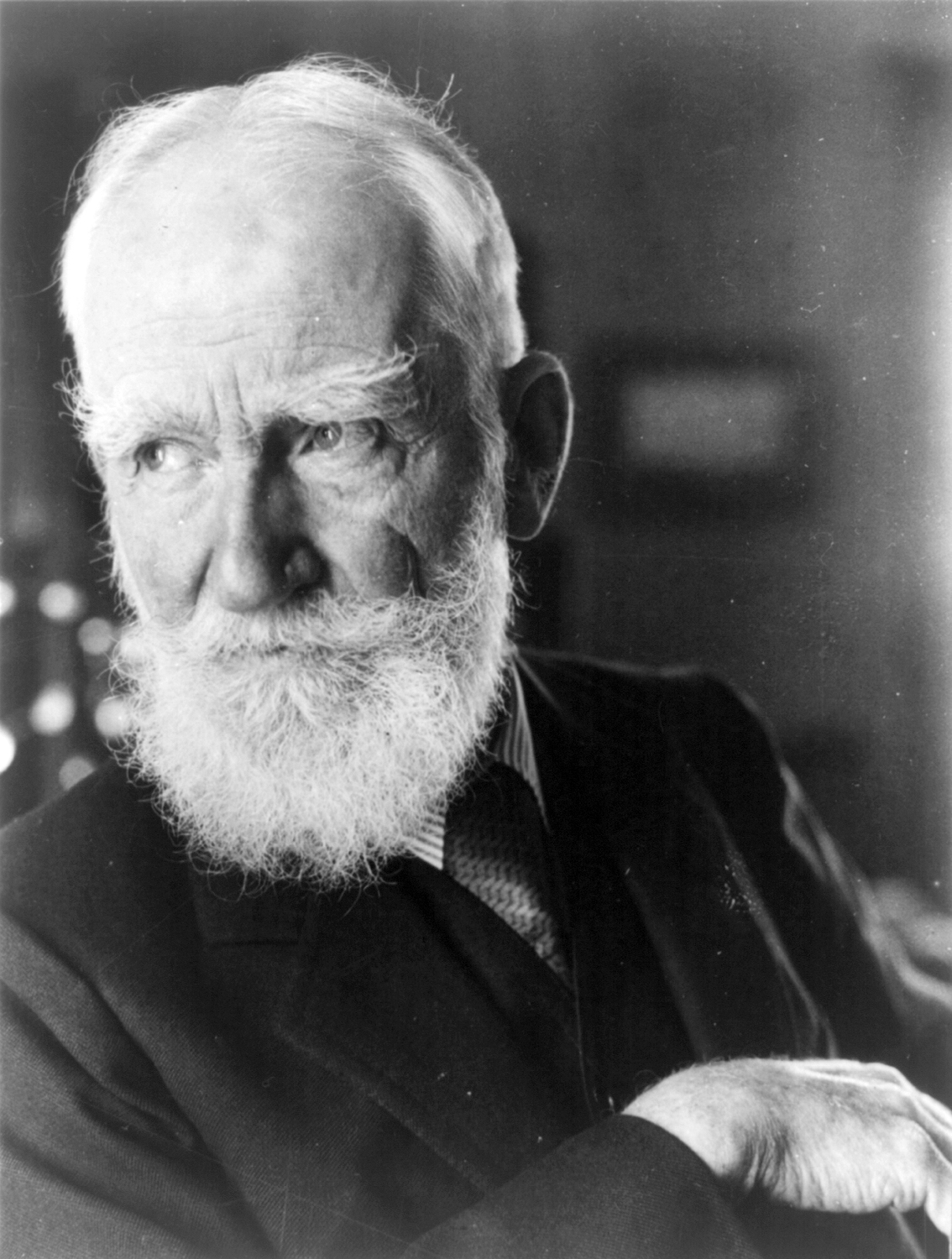
- Original language: English
- Written by: George Bernard Shaw
- Subject: 18th century politicians scheme to secure power by inventing party politics
- Genre: satire
- Setting: Althorp

Premiere
- Date: unperformed

The British Party System (1944) is a "playlet" by George Bernard Shaw satirically analysing the origins of the party system in British politics in the form of a pair of conversations between scheming power-brokers at various points in history, who devise it and adapt it to suit their personal ends.

== Creation ==
The playlet appears in Chapter III of Shaw's 1944 book Everybody's Political What's What?. It was never intended for performance, and is rather an essay in the form of a mini play. A similar previous playlet Arthur and the Acetone had been written in 1936 about the Balfour declaration.

Shaw introduces the playlet with as comment about how party politics came into being: "What are the facts? Let me put them in the form of a little historical drama, as that comes easiest to me and is the most amusing." He then goes on to explore the significance of party politics.

== Plot ==
Scene: Althorp, the residence of the Spencers, Earls of Sunderland.

King William III and Robert Spencer, 2nd Earl of Sunderland discuss the latter's plan to create government through parties, rather than by choosing ministers on individual merit. Sunderland says that this system will ensure that members of parliament cannot function independently, but will always be under the control of the party in power for fear that the other party will take over. Both parties will have to appeal to the basic prejudices of the voting public to have a chance of power.

25 years later, Robert Walpole and Sutherland's son Charles Spencer, 3rd Earl of Sunderland, argue about relative power of the King and the House of Lords. Walpole resists Sunderland's plans to restrict the number of peerages in the Upper House.

== Context ==
Shaw follows this playlet with the provocative comment:

This lands us in the unexpected conclusion that government by Parliaments modelled on the British Party System, far from being a guarantee of liberty and enlightened progress, must be ruthlessly discarded in the fullest agreement with Oliver Cromwell, Charles Dickens, John Ruskin, Thomas Carlyle, Adolf Hitler, Pilsudski, Benito Mussolini, Stalin and everyone else who has tried to govern efficiently and incorruptly by it, or who has studied its operation with a knowledge of its history and that of the Industrial Revolution.
