= Red Roses for Me (play) =

Play written by Seán O'Casey

Red Roses for Me is a four-act play written by Irish playwright Seán O'Casey which premiered at the Olympia Theatre in Dublin in 1943. The story is set against the backdrop of the Dublin Lockout of 1913, events in which O'Casey himself had participated.
