= The Shadow of a Gunman =

Play by Seán O'Casey

- Original language: English
- Written by: Seán O'Casey
- Characters: Donal Davoren Seumus Shields; Mr Gallogher; Minnie Powell; Mr Mulligan; Tommy Owens; Mr Maguire; Adolphus Grigson Mrs Grigson; An Auxiliary
- Series: Dublin Trilogy
- Setting: Dublin, 10–11 May 1920, a tenement flat

Premiere
- Date: April 12, 1923
- Place: Abbey Theatre, Dublin, Irish Free State

The Shadow of a Gunman is a 1923 tragicomedy play by Seán O'Casey set during the Irish War of Independence. It centres on the mistaken identity of a building tenant who is thought to be an IRA assassin.

It is the first in O'Casey's "Dublin Trilogy" - the other two being Juno and the Paycock (1924) and The Plough and the Stars (1926).

== Setting ==
Dublin. May 1920. Each act takes place in Seumus Shield's room in a tenement in Hilljoy Square.

== Synopsis ==
Donal Davoren is a poet who has come to room with Seumus Shields in a poor, Dublin tenement slum. Many of the residents of the tenement mistake Donal for an IRA gunman on the run. Donal does not refute this notoriety, especially when it wins him the affection of Minnie Powell, an attractive young woman in the tenement. Meanwhile, Seumus' business partner, Mr Maguire drops a bag off at Seumus' apartment before participating in an ambush in which he is killed. Seumus thinks the bag contains household items for re-sale. The city is put under curfew as a result of the ambush. The Black and Tans raid the tenement and, at that point, Donal and Seumus discover the bag is full of Mills bombs. Minnie Powell takes the bag and hides it in her own room. The Black and Tans find nothing of note in Seumus' room, but arrest Minnie Powell, who is later shot and killed when the Black and Tans lorry she is taken away in is ambushed.

== Characters ==
- Donal Davoren (Dan)- a poet living with Seumus in the tenement. Some of the residents suspect he has an affiliation with the IRA.
- Seumus Shields - a lazy pedlar of about thirty five disillusioned over the nationalist cause he supports who wishes the conflict will end.
- Tommy Owens - a younger man of twenty five that is enamored with the Republican effort.
- Adolphus Grigson (Dolphie)- an alcoholic resident of the tenement; a self-proclaimed "Orangeman", Grigson's Protestantism exemplified by his Bible and his picture of King William triumphant at the Battle of the Boyne hanging on the wall doesn't exempt him from being harassed by the Black and Tans.
- Mrs Debby Grigson - Adolphus's wife.
- Minnie Powell - a woman of twenty three that fawns over Davoran by virtue of his supposed IRA connections; she is sardonically equated to Kathleen Ni Houlihan, the symbol of Irish nationalism.
- Mr Mulligan - the landlord of the tenement.
- Mr Maguire - an IRA volunteer and friend of Seumus.
- Mrs Julia Henderson - a resident of a neighboring tenement and a champion of Mr Gallogher's plea.
- Mr James Gallogher - a resident of a neighboring tenement seeking the IRA's help.
- An Auxiliary - a soldier of the Auxiliary Division

== Performances, adaptations and allusions ==
- The first performance in England was given in 1958 at the Progress Theatre in Reading, Berkshire.

=== Television adaptations ===
- A televised version directed by Joseph Hardy starred Frank Converse and Academy Award-winner Richard Dreyfuss and was broadcast on 4 December 1972.
- Alvin Rakoff directed a televised version for the BBC2 Stage 2 series starring Stephen Rea, Sinéad Cusack & Donal McCann which was broadcast on 25 September 1973.
- 1974, Swedish TV: Skuggan av en hjälte (The shadow of a hero), directed by Göran Graffman starring Åke Fridell, Sif Ruud and Rolf Skoglund.
- Kenneth Branagh, Stephen Rea and Bronagh Gallagher starred in an adaptation as part of the BBC2 Performance series directed by Nye Heron and broadcast on 7 October 1995.

=== In popular culture ===
- In the music video for The Adventures song "Send My Heart" (1984), the lead character is seen trying out for a version of the play.
