= James Proudfoot =

British painter (1908–1971)

- Born: 3 March 1908; Perth, Scotland, UK
- Died: 15 July 1971 (aged 63); London, England, UK
- Education: Heatherley School of Fine Art, Goldsmiths, University of London
- Known for: painting
- Spouse: Ellen Pollock

James Proudfoot (1908–1971), was a Scottish-born British painter, known for his portraits and landscapes. He was active in London, from 1937 until 1971.

== Biography ==
James Proudfoot was born on 3 March 1908 in Perth, Scotland. He attended Perth Academy for high school. Then he studied at Heatherley School of Fine Art in London and Goldsmiths, University of London.

He moved to London in 1937 and in 1945 he married actress Ellen Pollock. He was a portrait painter and amongst his patrons were many actors of stage and screen in London. In the film The Laughing Lady (1946), Proudfoot painted the portraits for the set design.

Proudfoot died on 15 July 1971 in London.

Proudfoot's work is part of the collection at the University of Bristol Theatre Collection, and the Perth Museum and Art Gallery.
