= The Plough and the Stars =

1926 Seán O'Casey play

- Original language: English
- Written by: Seán O'Casey
- Characters: Fluther Good; Peter Flynn, Mrs Gogan, Bessie Burgess; Nora Clitheroe; The Young Covey; Jack Clitheroe; Mollser; Cpl. Stoddart; Sgt. Tinley, Captain Brennan, Lt Langon, Voice of the man, Rosie Redmond
- Subject: Easter Rising
- Setting: Dublin: A tenement house and a pub

Premiere
- Date: 8 February 1926
- Place: Abbey Theatre, Dublin, Irish Free State

The Plough and the Stars is a four-act play by the Irish writer Seán O'Casey that was first performed on 8 February 1926 at the Abbey Theatre. It is set in Dublin and addresses the 1916 Easter Rising. The play's title references the Starry Plough flag which was used by the Irish Citizen Army.

It is the third play of O'Casey's well-known "Dublin Trilogy" – the other two being The Shadow of a Gunman (1923) and Juno and the Paycock (1924).

== Plot ==
The first two acts take place in November 1915, looking forward to the liberation of Ireland. The last two acts are set during the Easter Rising, in April 1916.

=== Characters ===
Residents of the tenement house:

- Jack Clitheroe: a bricklayer and former member of the Irish Citizen Army.
- Nora Clitheroe: housewife of Jack Clitheroe.
- Peter Flynn: a labourer, and uncle of Nora Clitheroe.
- The Young Covey: a fitter, ardent socialist and cousin of Jack Clitheroe.
- Bessie Burgess: a street fruit-vendor, and Protestant.
- Mrs Gogan: a charwoman.
- Mollser Gogan: daughter of Mrs Gogan, dying of tuberculosis.
- Fluther Good: a carpenter, and trade-unionist.

Additional characters:

- Lieutenant Langon: a civil servant, and lieutenant of the Irish Volunteers.
- Captain Brennan: a chicken butcher, and captain of the Irish Citizen Army.
- Corporal Stoddard: a corporal of the Wiltshire Regiment of the British Army.
- Sergeant Tinley: a sergeant of the Wiltshire Regiment of the British Army.
- Rosie Redmond: a daughter of "the Digs," and a prostitute.
- A Bartender.
- The Figure In The Window: Unnamed but uses quotes attributed to Patrick Pearse.

=== Act I ===
The first act is a representation of normal working-class life in early twentieth century Dublin. The act opens with gossip from Mrs Gogan, a Catholic charwoman. Some other characters introduced are: Fluther Good, a trade unionist and carpenter; "the Young Covey", an ardent communist and fitter; Jack Clitheroe, the Covey's cousin and a former member of the Irish Citizen Army, at that time led by James Connolly. There is also Nora Clitheroe; Jack Clitheroe's wife. Later in this act, Captain Brennan knocks on the door of the Clitheroes' home and asks to see "Commandant Clitheroe", which surprises Jack Clitheroe, as he was not aware he'd been promoted. Nora begs him not to answer the door, but he does, and meets Captain Brennan, a chicken butcher and a member of the Irish Citizen Army. Captain Brennan hands Jack Clitheroe his orders telling him that he and his battalion are ordered to join General James Connolly at a meeting. Jack Clitheroe asks why he was not informed that he was made commandant. Captain Brennan claims he gave a letter to Nora Clitheroe explaining his new promotion. This is when Jack Clitheroe starts fighting with Nora because Nora burned the letter that told Jack Clitheroe he was promoted.

=== Act II ===
This act was originally a single-act play, called The Cooing of Doves.

The setting is the interior of a public house. A political rally is in progress outside. From time to time an unnamed man is heard addressing the crowd. (He is traditionally identified with Patrick Pearse.) Rosie Redmond, a prostitute, is complaining to the barman that the meeting is bad for business. Peter Flynn, Fluther Good and Young Covey come in and leave again at intervals, having a quick drink during the speeches. Bessie Burgess and Mrs. Gogan also come in, and a fight breaks out between them. After they have left, Covey insults Rosie, leading to a row between him and Fluther. Jack Clitheroe, Lieutenant Langon and Captain Brennan enter the bar, in uniform and carrying The Plough and the Stars flag and a green, white and orange tricolour. They are so moved by the speeches that they are determined to face imprisonment, injury or death for Ireland. They drink quickly and leave again in time to march their respective companies away. Fluther leaves with Rosie.

=== Act III ===
This takes place on Easter Monday, the opening day of the Easter Rising. Peter, Mrs Gogan and the Covey discuss the fighting that is going on and the Covey informs Mrs Gogan that Patrick Pearse came out of the General Post Office with his men to read out the Proclamation of Irish Independence. Bessie gloats about the Rebels' imminent defeat but is ignored by the others. Nora shows up with Fluther after having searched for Jack in the midst of the fighting unsuccessfully. As Mrs Gogan leads Mollser inside to lie down Bessie leaves to get some bread and comes back shortly informing the others that looting has broken out everywhere. A fashionably dressed middle-aged woman enters and asks the men to show her a safe route back to her home in Rathmines because the fighting has made it impossible to find a taxi or tram to take her back. Fluther tells her that any route is as safe as the others and leaves with the Covey to loot a nearby pub without helping her. Peter refuses to help her on the grounds that he might be shot and left with a limp and leaves her alone outside the tenement. Mrs Gogan attempts to leave the house pushing a pram until Bessie rushes after her claiming that the pram's owner left her in charge of it. The argument concludes with the two women agreeing to split the spoils. Brennan and Jack appear with a wounded rebel and Nora rushes to meet with them. She attempts to convince Jack to leave the fight and stay with her, telling him that she had gone out asking for his whereabouts when she hadn't gotten any news. Angered by her actions and the shame they brought upon him Jack ignores Nora's pleas and pushes her away roughly before leaving with his comrades. Nora then goes into labour.

=== Act IV ===
This takes place later in the rising. Mollser has died of tuberculosis, while Nora has had a stillbirth. She is delirious, imagining herself walking in the woods with Jack. Brennan arrives and tells the others that Jack has been shot dead. Two British soldiers arrive and escort the men away — civilians are suspected of aiding a rebel sniper. Nora goes to a window, calling for Jack; when Bessie pulls her away, Bessie is shot in the back, mistaken for a sniper.

== Attempted censorship ==
When O'Casey first submitted the play to the Abbey Theatre's directors, objections arose concerning the use of blasphemy and profanities along with the presence of a prostitute in the play. After a board of directors' meeting O'Casey agreed to modify some of the terms used as well as to cut out Rosie Redmond's song in act II that was deemed as being especially offensive. George O'Brien, the government nominee on the Abbey Theatre's board of directors, argued that a theatre that received a state subsidy should reflect the values of the state and that disregarding this could lead to the formation of hostile movements that would make it difficult for the government to continue funding the Abbey. Viewing this as a threat, Lady Gregory wrote to O'Brien stating that "If we have to choose between the subsidy and our freedom, it is our freedom we choose." Yeats agreed with Lady Gregory and argued that removing any part of the play for reasons relating to anything other than dramatic tradition would be denying their traditions.

== Riots ==
The play was first performed in front of a sold out crowd at Abbey Theatre due to the fact that a large portion of the seats had been reserved for government officials. The play was well received on its opening night on 8 February, although Lennox Robinson wrote to Lady Gregory following the performance stating that the audience had been very excited, which made it a "bad audience to judge a play by".

The first sign of displeasure among the audience occurred during the second act of the second performance of the play when Sighle Humphreys, a member of the Cumann na mBan, started to hiss from the back of the pit. When the curtains rose on 11 February to another full house the presence of Cumann na mBan and Sinn Féin members was hard to ignore. The women representing Cumann na mBan at the performance were all in some way related to men that had lost their lives during the Easter Rising, which created an atmosphere of expectations in the theatre surrounding the topic of the Rising from the moment the play started.

The riots began during the play's second act when Rosie Redmond, a prostitute, is seen lounging in the pub awaiting clients as the Figure in the Window, using the words of Patrick Pearse, declares that 'Bloodshed is a cleansing and a sanctifying thing, and the nation that regards it as the final horror has lost its manhood'. In contrasting the character of Rosie with the Figure's speech, O'Casey compares the ideal dream of the patriots with what W. B. Yeats called the normal grossness of life. Clitheroe, Langon and Brennan then enter the stage in uniforms carrying the tricolour flag of the Irish Volunteers and the plough-and-stars flag of the Irish Citizen Army, which was perceived as an insult to the men who had died during the Rising. Some of the play's actors attempted to distance themselves from the roles they had played by asking the rioters to distinguish between the actors and the play, which was responded to in kind by a voice from the pit yelling "you have no right to earn your bread by insulting Ireland".

Upon arriving to the theatre as the riots were ongoing, Yeats famously declared to rioters against the play, making a reference to the 1907 "Playboy Riots" (opposing The Playboy of the Western World by John Millington Synge): "I thought you had tired of this, which commenced fifteen years ago. But you have disgraced yourselves again. Is this going to be a recurring celebration of Irish genius? Synge first and then O'Casey."

== In performance ==
- The Plough and the Stars at the Internet Broadway Database
- In 1965 the play was staged by the Edinburgh Gateway Company, directed by Victor Carin.
- In 1984 Greg Hersov directed a production at the Royal Exchange, Manchester with Liam Neeson, Dierdra Morris, Bernard Hill and Val McLane.
- In 2016 the National Theatre co-produced (with Bristol Old Vic) a well-received production, co-directed by Howard Davies and Jeremy Herrin.

== Adaptations ==
Elie Siegmeister used the play as the subject of his opera of the same name, composed in the 1960s. The opera was given its New York premiere at Symphony Space in October 1979 by the New York Lyric Opera.

In 1936, the play was adapted into a film by American director John Ford, starring Barbara Stanwyck and Preston Foster. In 2011, BBC Radio 3 broadcast a production directed by Nadia Molinari with Elaine Cassidy as Nora and Padraic Delaney as Jack.
