= Watergate Theatre, London =

Theatre in London

Coordinates: 51°30′30.25″N 0°7′24.27″W

The Watergate Theatre in London existed from 1949–56, located on Buckingham Street, Westminster.

In 1949 Elizabeth Denby, together with the theatre director and playwright Velona Pilcher, the writer Elizabeth Sprigge, and Jane Drew converted a site at 29 Buckingham Gate, originally a Chinese restaurant destroyed in World War II during the Blitz, to create a performing space for their theatre club. They were inspired by the Gate Theatre which had been forced to close following bombardment of the premises nearby in Villiers Street in the 1940s. This new venture consisted of two club rooms, and a 70-seat theatre. In 1950 plans were made to increase the seating to 100, and for the walls to display murals designed by Marc Chagall. In 1950 Chagall started work on two studies for the projected murals – 'The Dance and the Circus' and 'The Blue Circus'. After Pilcher's death in 1952, Chagall gave his murals to the Tate Gallery, and the theatre was taken over by the New Watergate Theatre Club.

In September 1950 it staged the premiere of George Bernard Shaw's Farfetched Fables, the last work Shaw completed, and it also staged the English premiere of August Strindberg's The Great Highway, in a translation by Sprigge. That year also saw the staging and almost runaway success of Pablo Picasso's short play, Desire caught by the Tail in the translation by Roland Penrose. In 1951 it presented a production of Shakespeare's The Comedy of Errors performed by the Cambridge University Amateur Dramatic Club and directed by John Barton.

Several revues were staged at the Watergate Theatre, including Sandy Wilson's See You Later (1951) featuring Dulcie Gray and with Donald Swann playing the piano, and John Cranko's Cranks (1955, featuring Anthony Newley and with music by John Addison) and setting by John Piper.

Given notice that 29 Buckingham Gate was due to be demolished as part of the Strand Improvement Scheme, the New Watergate moved to the Comedy Theatre in Panton Street in 1956.
