= Farfetched Fables =

George Bernard Shaw play collection

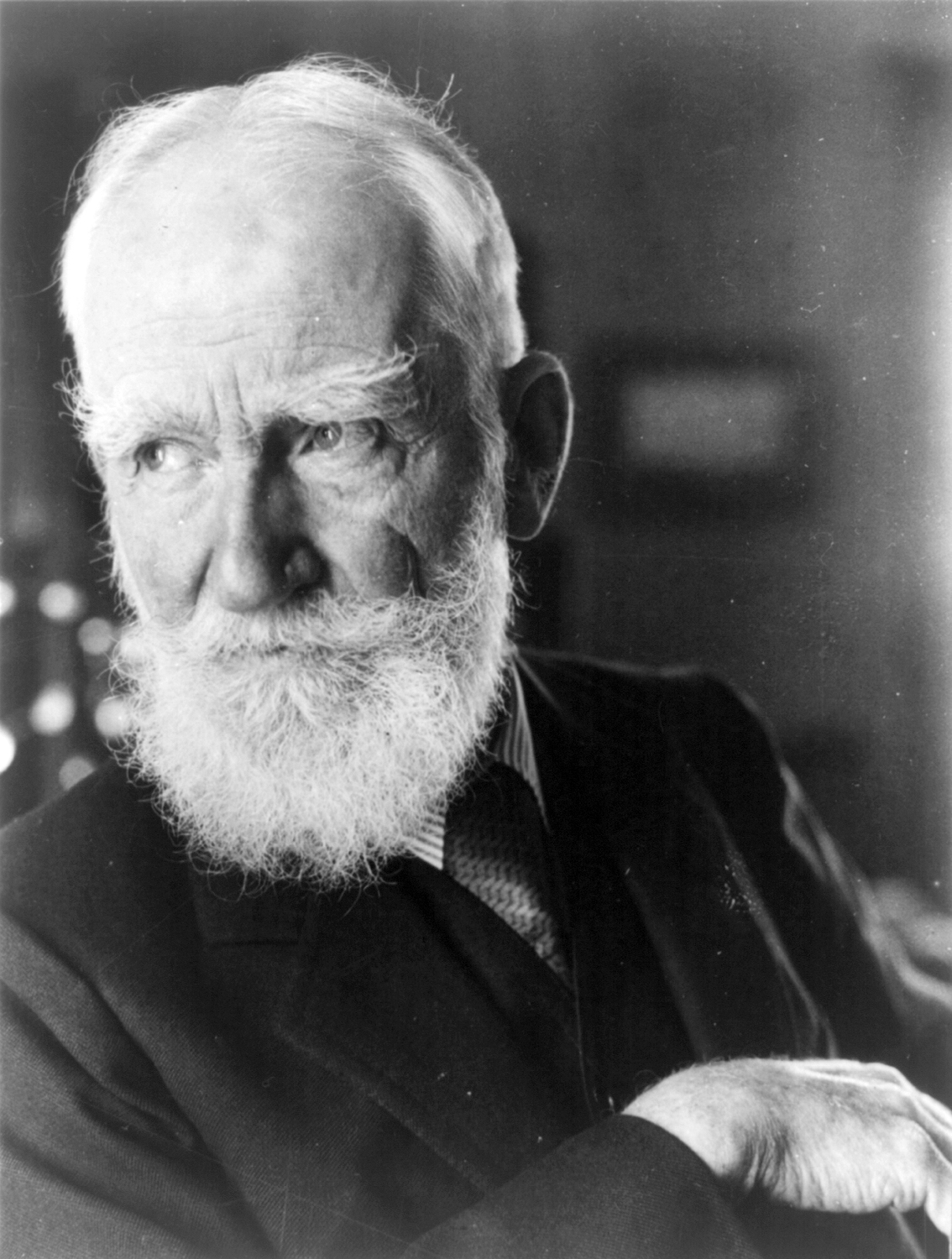
- Written by: George Bernard Shaw
- Original language: English
- Subject: Characters discuss ideas for a utopian future
- Genre: polemic
- Setting: various phases from the present to the far future

Premiere
- Date premiered: January 13, 1951
- Place premiered: Watergate Theatre, London, September 6, 1950 (private); People's Theatre, Newcastle upon Tyne, January 13, 1951 (public)

Farfetched Fables (1948) is a collection of six short plays by George Bernard Shaw in which he outlines several of his most idiosyncratic personal ideas. The fables are preceded by a long preface. The ideas in the plays and the preface have been called the "violent unabashed prejudices of an eccentric".

== Creation ==
Shaw intended to produce a series of plays summing up his own most unfashionable and unpopular ideas. The result is summed up by Archibald Henderson as a hodge-podge of utopian, puritanical and authoritarian concepts:

In his latter years, Shaw appears to have taken seriously some of the fantastic ideas he had conceived in the writing of imaginative literature; and these fancies hardened with the years into fixed convictions:the ultimate redemption of mankind on earth from the burden of the flesh and the ills that flesh is heir to, the elimination of sexual relations and the universal adoption of artificial insemination, the thoroughgoing reorganization of education with the all-embracing tenet of learning by doing, appreciating literature, art, music, sculpture, architecture, by contact experience (reading, seeing, hearing, painting, drawing, sculpting, building), the elimination by gas asphyxiation of the demonstrably immoral and incurably criminal, the extension of the extreme life span roughly from one century to three centuries, elimination of dependence upon food and learning to live on air and water alone, the rewriting of the Prayer Book of the Church of England, the revision of the Scriptures in order to reconcile the irrational dichotomy of the Deity, seen in two separate images in Old and New Testaments, abolition of the party system, expanding the civil service to embrace the highest offices up to and including the Prime Minister, and many other proposals, particularly the devising of a new alphabet--which are, by an incalculable multitude, irrevocably rejected as fads and follies, quirks and crotchets, fancies and fantasies.

== Plot ==
The plays take the form of five dialogues and one monologue in which the various topics are discussed.

In the first fable, set shortly after World War II, a Jewish chemist decides that the atomic bomb is too clumsy a weapon, and invents a form of poison gas that is lighter than air.

In the second fable the British government refuses to buy the gas, so the scientist sells it to South Africa, which uses it on London. British politicians are discussing the ways South Africa has been using the gas, but find themselves being eliminated by it. These events unleash a "dark age".

In the third fable, set in a socialist society of the future, scientists have developed techniques to exactly measure human capabilities. Two subjects are tested in the Anthropometric Laboratory by members of the "Upper Ten", a ruling elite. Social status is determined by these scientific tests. Those who are "dangerous and incorrigable" are liquidated.

In the fourth fable, set in the further future, the Commissioner of Diets dictates into a machine a report about how humans can now live entirely on air and water. Having started by eliminating meat from their diet, they have progressed to live without food altogether, inspired by a mythical ancient sage who lived before the "dark age" and whose name is variously known as "Shelley, Shakespear and Shavius".

This fable is followed by a dialogue between two men, a woman and a hermaphrodite, who discuss the disgusting way in which humans used to reproduce, explaining that it is now all done in a laboratory, without the need to "practice personal contacts which I would rather not describe". The hermaphrodite speaks of the desire to escape physicality altogether and become pure mind.

In the final fable a group of students discuss the existence of purely disembodied beings who live entirely for "knowledge and power" and who use embodied persons to help them achieve it. They note that these beings might easily kill them: "for the pursuit of knowledge and power involves the slaughter and destruction of everything that opposes it". However, they are needed by these beings to be "destroyers of vermin", as "we have to execute criminals who have no conscience and are incorrigible". At this point one of the disembodied beings appears, taking the form of angel-like creature, and announces himself as "Raphael". Raphael explains that physical pleasures revolt him, and that he is dedicated to purely intellectual passions.

== Production ==
Shaw never intended that the play would have mainstream theatre performance. He gave a copy to the Shaw society to organise a reading for its members. A small private production was organised at the tiny Watergate Theatre, London on September 6, 1950, directed by Shaw himself, two months before his death. A public performance followed a year later after Shaw's death in Newcastle upon Tyne at the radical People's Theatre, which had a long association with Shaw.

== Interpretations ==
Matthew Yde sees the play as essentially a reworking of Back to Methuselah, containing the same ideas about "creative evolution" articulated in the form of a myth that draws on Christian traditions. The events of World War II, though alluded to, seem to have had no effect on him: "the stunning revelations about Nazi death camps seem to have made no impression on Shaw, nor have altered his belief in the importance of state liquidation of public enemies in the least."

In a symposium discussion following a 1992 performance of the play at the Milwaukee Shaw Festival, Martin Esslin said that the play indicated that Shaw still saw the future in "nineteenth century terms. It's almost as if someone from the 1880s has suddenly woken up in the 1940s". Esslin considered it to be a "very despairing" play, but clearly drawing on Hegelian ideas of a dialectic of the spirit. Stanley Weintraub argued that Shaw was far less despairing than his Fabian colleague H. G. Wells, but that the play is still one of "despair, gloom and death". Julius Novick noted the references to the creation of Israel in the figure of the Jewish chemist, who appears to be based on Chaim Weizmann. Weizmann had previously been portrayed in similar terms in Shaw's 1936 "playlet" Arthur and the Acetone.
