= Seán O'Casey =

Irish dramatist and memoirist (1880–1964)

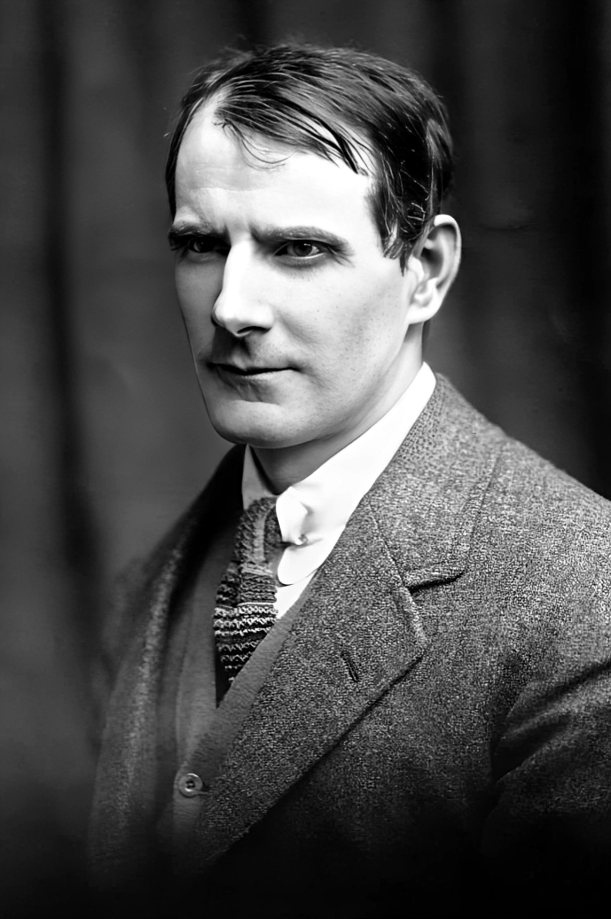
- O'Casey, c. 1910s
- Born: John Casey; 30 March 1880; Dublin, Ireland
- Died: 18 September 1964 (aged 84); Torquay, Devon, England
- Occupation: Dramatist
- Spouse: Eileen Carey Reynolds (m. 1927)
- Children: Breon, Niall, Shivaun
- Relatives: Agnes O'Casey (great-granddaughter)
- Writing career
- Pen name: Seán Ó Cathasaigh
- Language: English

Seán O'Casey (Irish: Seán Ó Cathasaigh [ˈʃaːn̪ˠ oː ˈkahəsˠiː]; born John Casey; 30 March 1880 – 18 September 1964) was an Irish dramatist and memoirist. A committed socialist, he was the first Irish playwright of note to write about the struggles and experiences of the working class in Dublin. He is best known for his "Dublin Trilogy", which includes The Shadow of a Gunman (1923), Juno and the Paycock (1924) and The Plough and the Stars (1926).

== Early life ==
O'Casey was born at 85 Upper Dorset Street, Dublin, as John Casey, the son of Michael Casey, a mercantile clerk (who worked for the Irish Church Missions), and Susan Archer. His parents were Protestants and he was a member of the Church of Ireland, baptised on 28 July 1880 in St. Mary's parish, confirmed at St John the Baptist Church in Clontarf, and an active member of St. Barnabas' Church on Sheriff Street until his mid-20s, when he drifted away from the church. There is a church called 'Saint Burnupus' in his play Red Roses For Me.

O'Casey's father died when Seán was just six years of age, leaving a family of thirteen. The family lived a peripatetic life thereafter, moving from house to house around north Dublin. As a child, he suffered from poor eyesight, which interfered somewhat with his early education, but O'Casey taught himself to read and write by the age of thirteen.

He left school at fourteen and worked at a variety of jobs, including a nine-year period as a railwayman on the GNR. O'Casey worked in Eason's for a short while, in the newspaper distribution business, but was sacked for not taking off his cap when collecting his wage packet.

From the early 1890s, O'Casey and his elder brother, Archie, put on performances of plays by Dion Boucicault and William Shakespeare in the family home. He also got a small part in Boucicault's The Shaughraun in the Mechanics' Theatre, which stood on the site of what was to be the Abbey Theatre.

== Politics ==
As his interest in Irish nationalism grew, O'Casey joined the Gaelic League in 1906 and learned the Irish language. At this time, he Gaelicised his name from John Casey to Seán Ó Cathasaigh. He also learned to play the Uilleann pipes and was a founder and secretary of the St. Laurence O'Toole Pipe Band. He joined the Irish Republican Brotherhood, and became involved in the Irish Transport and General Workers Union, which had been established by Jim Larkin to represent the interests of the unskilled labourers who inhabited the Dublin tenements. He participated in the Dublin lock-out but was blacklisted and could not find steady work for some time.

In 1912 Casey joined James Connolly's Socialist Party of Ireland. In March 1914, he became General Secretary of Larkin's Irish Citizen Army, which would soon be run by James Connolly. On 24 July 1914 he resigned from the ICA, after his proposal to ban dual membership in both the ICA and the Irish Volunteers was rejected.

One of his first satirical ballads, "The Grand Oul' Dame Britannia", was published in The Workers' Republic on 15 January 1916 under his penname An Gall Fada.

"Ah, what is all the fuss about?", says the grand old dame Britannia,
"Is it us you are trying to live without?", Says the grand old dame Britannia.
"Shut your ears to the Sinn Féin lies, you know every Gael for England dies,"
"And you'll have Home Rule 'neath the clear blue skies." Says the grand old dame Britannia.

— Seán Ó Cathasaigh, "Grand Ould Dame Britannia", 1916

From the 1920s onwards, Casey focused on his literary career and was not directly involved in a political movement but remained supportive of socialist causes and was especially enthusiastic about the Soviet Union. Writing in 1958, Casey affirmed his politics:

"I am still a Republican, a Communist, and, in a way, a member of the Gaelic League."

== After the Easter Rising ==
In 1917, his friend Thomas Ashe died in a hunger strike and it inspired him to write. He wrote two laments: one in verse and a longer one in prose. Ballads authored around this time by O'Casey featured in the two editions of Songs of the Wren, published by Fergus O'Connor in 1918; these included "The Man from the Daily Mail", which, along with "The Grand Oul' Dame Britannia", became Irish rebel music staples. A common theme was opposition to the possible introduction of conscription in Ireland by the British government during World War I.

He spent the next five years writing plays. In 1918, when both his sister and mother died (in January and September, respectively), the St Laurence O'Toole National Club commissioned him to write the play The Frost in the Flower. He had been in the St Laurence O'Toole Pipe Band and played on the hurling team. The club declined to put the play on out of fear that its satirical treatment of several parishioners would cause resentment. O'Casey then submitted the play to the Abbey Theatre, which also rejected it but encouraged him to continue writing. Eventually, O'Casey expanded the play to three acts and retitled it The Harvest Festival.

== Abbey Theatre ==
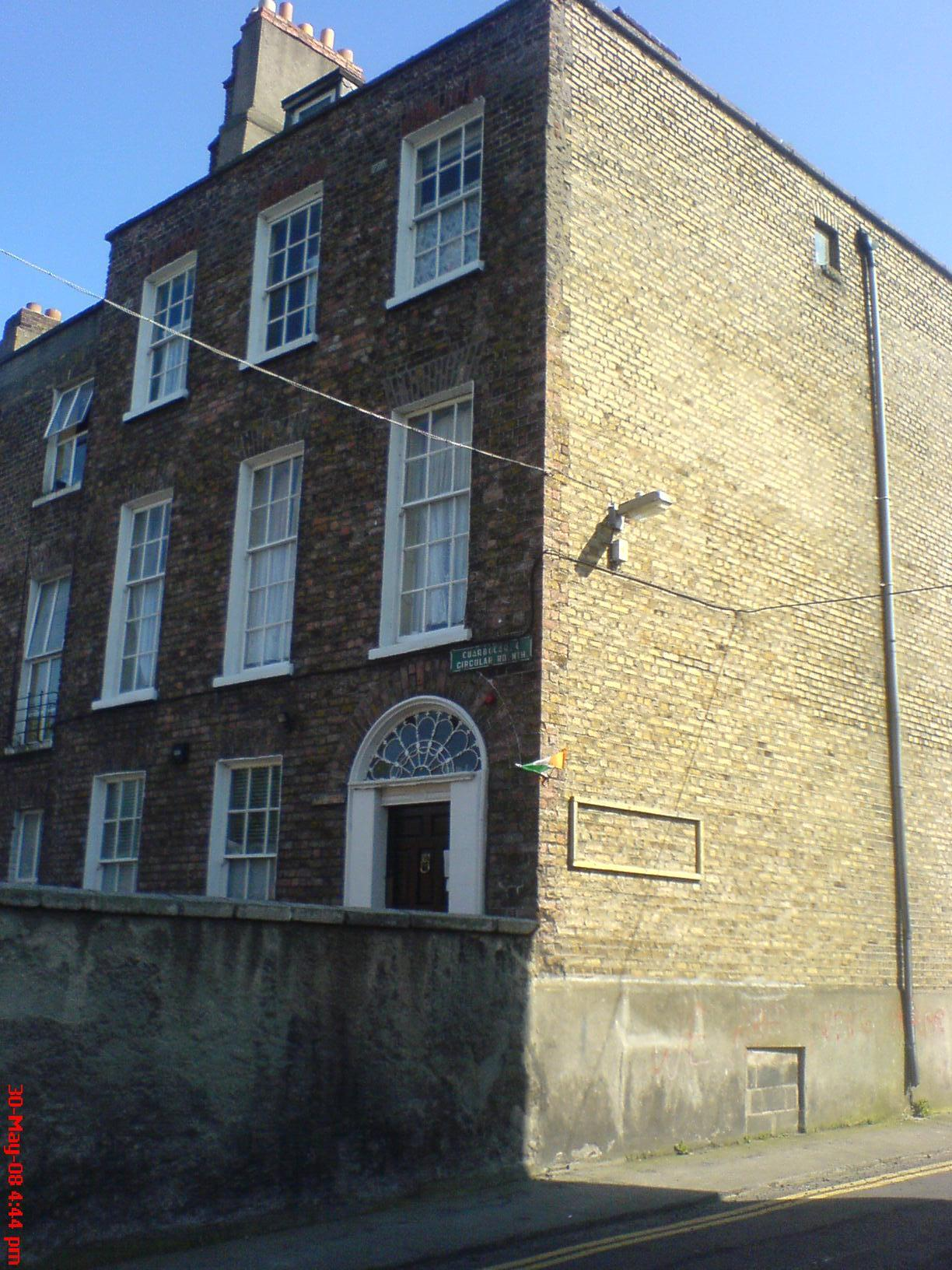
No. 422 North Circular Road, the house where O'Casey wrote the Dublin trilogy

=== The Shadow of a Gunman ===
O'Casey's first accepted play, The Shadow of a Gunman, was performed at the Abbey Theatre in 1923. This was the beginning of a relationship that was to be fruitful for both theatre and dramatist but which ended in some bitterness. The play deals with the impact of revolutionary politics on Dublin's slums and their inhabitants, and is understood to be set in Mountjoy Square, where he lived during the 1916 Easter Rising.

=== Juno and the Paycock and The Plough and the Stars ===
The Shadow of a Gunman was followed by Juno and the Paycock (1924) and The Plough and the Stars (1926). The former deals with the effect of the Irish Civil War on the working class poor of the city, while the latter is set in Dublin in 1916 around the Easter Rising. Both plays deal realistically with the rhetoric and dangers of Irish patriotism, with tenement life, self-deception, and survival; they are tragi-comedies in which violent death throws into relief the blustering masculine bravado of characters such as Jack Boyle and Joxer Daly in Juno and the Paycock and the heroic resilience of Juno herself or of Bessie Burgess in The Plough and the Stars. Juno and the Paycock became a film directed by Alfred Hitchcock.

The Plough and the Stars was not well received by the Abbey audience and resulted in scenes reminiscent of the riots that greeted J. M. Synge's The Playboy of the Western World in 1907. There was a riot reported on the fourth night of the show. His depiction of sex and religion offended even some of the actors, who refused to speak their lines. The full-scale riot occurred partly because the play was thought to be an attack on the men in the rising and partly in protest in opposition to the animated appearance of a prostitute in Act 2. W. B. Yeats got onto the stage and roared at the audience: "You have disgraced yourselves again." The takings of the play were substantial compared with the previous week. O'Casey gave up his job and became a full-time writer.

After the incident, even though the play was well liked by most of the Abbey goers, Liam O'Flaherty, Austin Clarke and F. R. Higgins launched an attack against it in the press. O'Casey believed it was an attack on Yeats, that they were using O'Casey's play to berate Yeats.

In 1952 he appeared in a play by Irish playwright Teresa Deevy, The Wild Goose, in which he played the part of Father Ryan. O'Casey was involved in numerous productions with the Abbey; these can be found in the Abbey Archives.

== England ==
While in London to receive the Hawthornden Prize and supervise the West End production of Juno and the Paycock, O'Casey fell in love with Eileen Carey. The couple were married in 1927 and remained in London until 1938, when they moved to Totnes.

=== The Silver Tassie ===
In 1928, W. B. Yeats rejected O'Casey's fourth play, The Silver Tassie for the Abbey. It was an attack on imperialist wars and the suffering they cause. The Abbey refused to perform it. The premier production was funded by Charles B. Cochran, who took only eighteen months to put it on stage. It was put on at the Apollo Theatre but lasted for only twenty-six performances. It was directed by Raymond Massey, starred Charles Laughton and with an Act II set design by Augustus John. George Bernard Shaw and Lady Gregory had a favourable opinion of the show.

Denis Johnston, who knew O'Casey and spent time with him in London in the 1920s, is certain that the Abbey was right not to stage The Silver Tassie: "Its expressionist second act was at that time far beyond the scope of the Abbey Theatre." A year later Johnston's own The Old Lady Says "No!" was similarly rejected, for the same reason. Nevertheless O'Casey's resentment over this persisted for many years.

=== Within the Gates ===
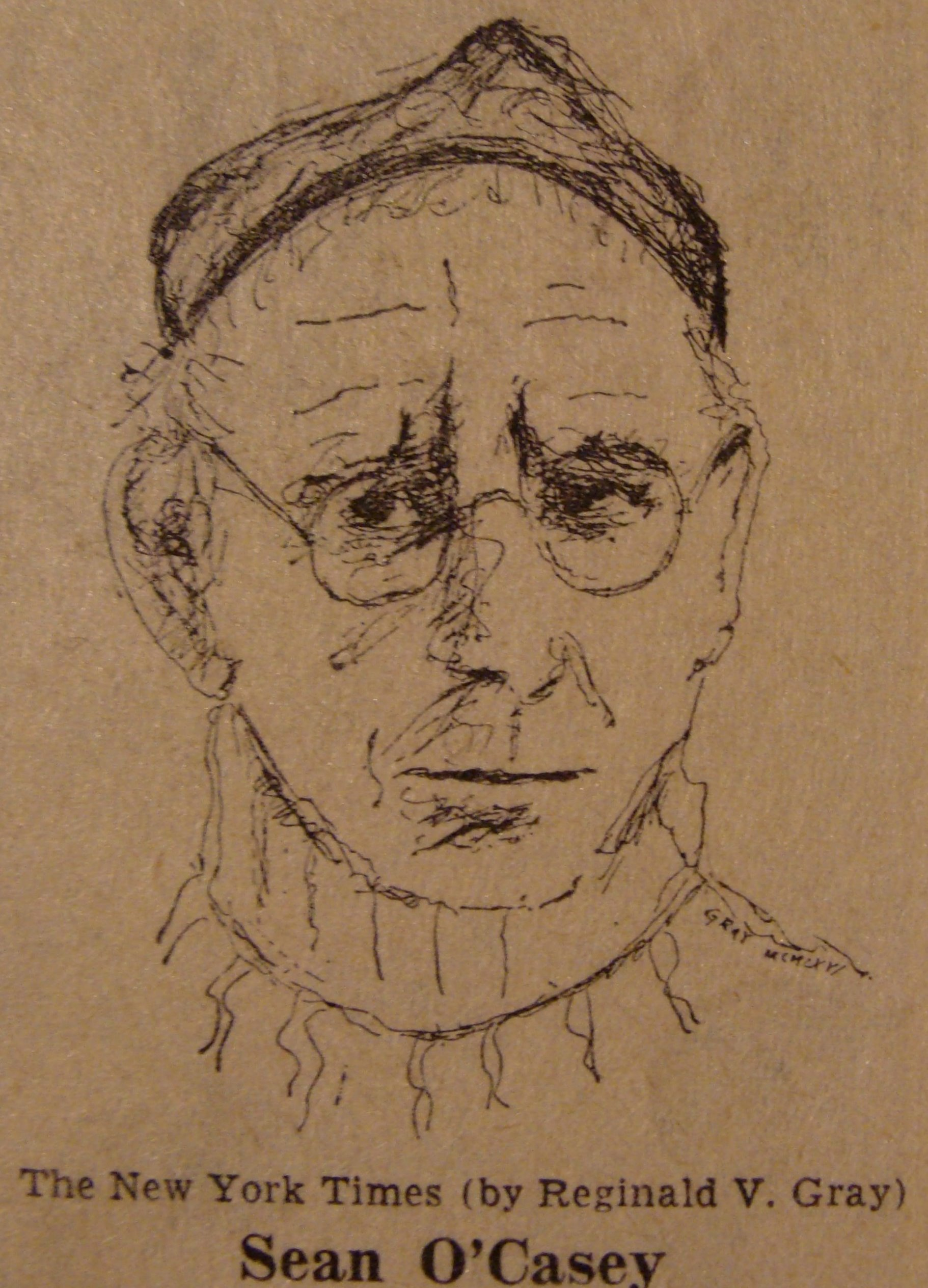
Study of Seán O'Casey by Dublin artist Reginald Gray, for The New York Times (1966)

The plays O'Casey wrote after this included the darkly allegorical Within the Gates (1934), which is set within the gates of a busy city park based on London's Hyde Park. Although it was highly controversial, Eugene O'Neill responded positively to it. The play was originally going to be a film script for Alfred Hitchcock. O'Casey's widow described it in her memoir, Sean (1971):

Originally he had imagined it as a film in which everything, from flower-beds to uniforms, would be stylised. Beginning at dawn and ending at midnight, to the soft chime of Big Ben in the distance, it would be "geometrical and emotional, the emotions of the living characters to be shown against their own patterns and the patterns of the Park." Having got so far, he wrote to Alfred Hitchcock, and when Hitchcock and his wife dined with us Sean explained his ideas to an apparently responsive hearer. Hitchcock and he talked excitedly. They parted on the same terms, with the prospect of another immediate meeting, and Sean never heard again.

The play was unsuccessful in Northern Ireland and was not produced in the south until 2010. In the autumn of 1934, O'Casey went to the United States to visit the New York City production of Within the Gates, which he admired greatly. It was directed by actor Melvyn Douglas and starred Lillian Gish. This is when he befriended Eugene O'Neill, Sherwood Anderson and George Jean Nathan.

=== The Star Turns Red ===
The Star Turns Red (1940) is a four-act political allegory in which the Star of Bethlehem turns red. The story follows Big Red, a trade-union leader (who was based on O'Casey's friend James Larkin). The union takes over an unnamed country despite the ruthless efforts of the Saffron Shirts, a fascist organisation openly supported by the country's Roman Catholic hierarchy.

The play received its world premiere in March 1940 at Unity Theatre in London, and was performed in 1978 at the Abbey Theatre in Dublin.

=== Purple Dust ===
Purple Dust (1943) follows two wealthy, materialistic English stockbrokers who buy an ancient Irish mansion and attempt to restore it with their wrong notions of Tudor customs and taste. They try to impose upon a community with vastly different customs and lifestyles that are much closer to ancient Gaelic ways and are against such false values.

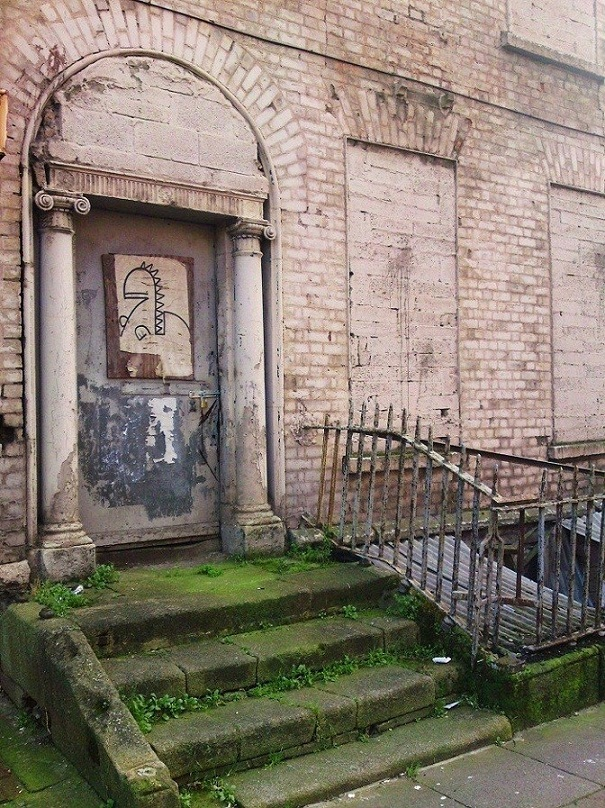
Seán O'Casey's childhood home. Upper Dorset Street, Dublin

The Englishmen set their opposing standards against those represented by the men employed to renovate the house. In the resulting confrontation the English are satirised and in the end disappointed when a symbolic storm destroys their dream of resettling the old into the present. The hint that is enforced by the conclusion is that the little heap of purple dust that remains will be swept away by the rising winds of change, like the residue of pompous imperialism that abides in Ireland. The show has been compared to Shaw's John Bull's Other Island, which was one of O'Casey's favourites, but aside from a few similarities, there are no real grounds for comparison.

=== Red Roses for Me ===
He also wrote Red Roses for Me (1943), which saw him move away from his early style in favour of more expressionistic means and overtly socialist content to his writing. It went up at Dublin's Olympia Theatre (which was the first one produced in Ireland in seventeen years). It would move on to London in 1946, where O'Casey himself was able to see it. This was the first show of his own he saw since Within The Gates in 1934.

=== Later plays ===
Oak Leaves and Lavender (1945) is a propaganda play commemorating the Battle of Britain and Britain's heroism in the anti-Nazi crusade. It takes place in a manor with shadowy 18th-century figures commenting on the present.

These plays have never had the same critical or popular success as the early trilogy. After the Second World War he wrote Cock-a-Doodle Dandy (1949), which is perhaps his most beautiful and exciting work. From The Bishop's Bonfire (1955) O'Casey's late plays are studies on the common life in Ireland, "Irish microcosmos", like The Drums of Father Ned (1958).

His play The Drums of Father Ned was supposed to go up at the 1958 Dublin Theatre Festival, but the Catholic Archbishop of Dublin, John Charles McQuaid, refused to give his blessing (it has been assumed because works of both James Joyce and O'Casey were in the festival). After Joyce's play was quietly dropped, massive changes were required for The Drums of Father Ned, a devious way to get O'Casey to drop. After this, Samuel Beckett withdrew his mime piece in protest.

== Later life ==
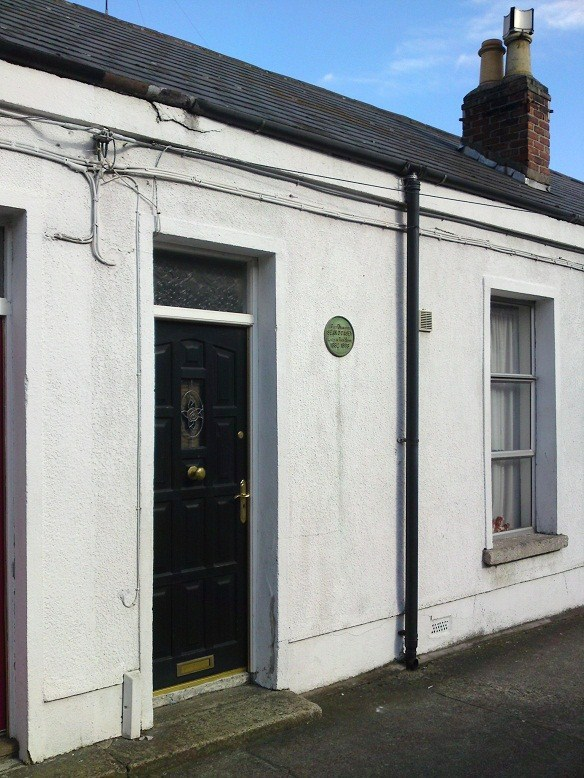
No. 9 Innisfallen Parade, Dublin. Seán O'Casey lived here from 1882 to 1888.

In 1959, O'Casey gave his blessing to a musical adaptation of Juno and the Paycock by American composer Marc Blitzstein. The musical, retitled Juno, was a commercial failure, closing after only 16 Broadway performances. It was also panned by some critics as being too "dark" to be an appropriate musical, a genre then almost invariably associated with light comedy. However, the music, which survives in a cast album made before the show opened, has since been regarded as some of Blitzstein's best work. Although endorsed by the then 79-year-old O'Casey, he did not contribute to the production or even see it during its brief run. Despite general agreement on the brilliance of the underlying material, the musical has defied all efforts to mount any successful revival.

Also in 1959, George Devine produced Cock-a-Doodle Dandy at the Royal Court Theatre and it was also successful at the Edinburgh International Festival and had a West End run.

His eightieth birthday occurred in 1960, and to celebrate, David Krause and Robert Hogan wrote full-length studies. The Mermaid Theatre in London launched the "O'Casey Festival" in 1962, which in turn made more theatre establishments put on his works, mostly in Britain and Germany. It is in the late years that O'Casey put his creative energy into his six-volume Autobiography.

On 18 September 1964 at the age of 84, O'Casey died of a heart attack, in Torquay, Devon. He was cremated at the Golders Green Crematorium.

In 1965, his autobiography Mirror in My House (the umbrella title under which the six autobiographies he published from 1939 to 1956 were republished, in two large volumes, in 1956) was turned into a film based on his life called Young Cassidy. The film was directed by Jack Cardiff (and John Ford) featuring Rod Taylor (as O'Casey), Flora Robson, Maggie Smith, Julie Christie, Edith Evans and Michael Redgrave.

== Personal life ==
O'Casey was married to Irish actress Eileen Carey Reynolds (1903–1995) from 1927 to his death. The couple had three children: two sons, Breon and Níall (who died in 1957 of leukaemia), and a daughter, Shivaun.

== Archival collection ==
In 2005, David H. Greene donated a collection of letters he received from O'Casey from 1944 to 1962 to the Fales Library at New York University. Also in the collection are two letters written by Eileen O'Casey and one letter addressed to Catherine Greene, David Greene's spouse.

O'Casey's papers are held in the New York Public Library, the Cornell University Library, the University of California, Los Angeles Library System, the University of London Library, the National Library of Ireland, Colby College, Boston College and the Fales Library.

== Legacy ==
In Dublin, a foot bridge on the Liffey is named after him, as is Sean O'Casey Avenue in Summerhill and 'Sean O'Casey Community Centre' in East Wall.

There is a plaque dedicated to O'Casey at the site of his former house on Dorset Street, Dublin and also at the building where he stayed in a flat in Wandsworth, London in England.

== Works ==
- Lament for Thomas Ashe (1917), as Seán Ó Cathasaigh
- The Story of Thomas Ashe (1917), as Seán Ó Cathasaigh
- Songs of the Wren (1918), as Seán Ó Cathasaigh
- More Wren Songs (1918), as Seán Ó Cathasaigh
- The Harvest Festival (1918)
- The Story of the Irish Citizen Army (1919), as Seán Ó Cathasaigh
- The Shadow of a Gunman (1923)
- Kathleen Listens In (1923)
- Juno and the Paycock (1924)
- Nannie's Night Out (1924)
- The Plough and the Stars (1926)
- The Silver Tassie (1927)
- Within the Gates (1934)
- The End of the Beginning (1937)
- A Pound on Demand (1939)
- The Star Turns Red (1940)
- Red Roses for Me (1942)
- Purple Dust (1940/1945)
- Oak Leaves and Lavender (1946)
- Cock-a-Doodle Dandy (1949)
- Hall of Healing (1951)
- Bedtime Story (1951)
- Time to Go (1951)
- The Wild Goose (1952)
- The Bishop's Bonfire: A Sad Play within the Tune of a Polka (1955)
- Mirror in My House (two volumes, 1956, reissued as Autobiographies, 1963 and since; combining the six books of memoirs listed next)
  - I Knock at the Door (1939)
  - Pictures in the Hallway (1942)
  - Drums Under the Window (1945)
  - Inishfallen, Fare Thee Well (1949)
  - Rose and Crown (1952)
  - Sunset and Evening Star (1954)
- The Drums of Father Ned (written 1957, staged 1959)
- Behind the Green Curtains (1961)
- Figuro in the Night (1961)
- The Moon Shines on Kylenamoe (1961)
- Niall: A Lament (1991)

== Awards and recognition ==
- (1926) – Hawthornden Prize for Juno and the Paycock
- (1949) – Newspaper Guild of New York's "Page One Award" for I Knock at the Door, Pictures in the Hallway, Drums under the Windows, and Inishfallen, Fare Thee Well
- Order of the British Empire (declined)
- (1960) – Durham University Honorary Degree (declined)
- (1960) – University of Exeter Honorary Degree (declined)
- (1961) – Trinity College, Dublin Honorary Degree (declined)

== See also ==
- List of Irish Nobel laureates and nominees
