= Nick Drake discography =

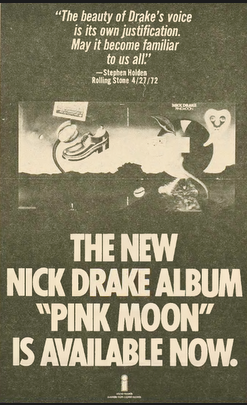
- Poster promoting the release of Nick Drake's album Pink Moon in 1972
- Studio albums: 3
- Soundtrack albums: 15
- Live albums: 1
- Compilation albums: 8
- Singles: 5
- Video albums: 1
- Box sets: 2
- Compilation appearances: 11

The discography of Nick Drake, an English folk musician and singer-songwriter, consists of three studio albums, five singles, seven compilation albums, two box sets, one video album and various soundtrack and compilation appearances.

Drake was born on 19 June 1948 in Yangon, Burma, returning with his family to England in 1950. He was encouraged by his mother to learn piano and later learned clarinet and saxophone while attending Marlborough College. In 1965, Drake purchased his first guitar and began experimenting with open tunings and fingerpicking, techniques that later became a signature in his music. While Drake was attending the University of Cambridge in 1968, he was introduced to the American record producer Joe Boyd and signed a contract to Island Records.

Drake released his debut studio album, Five Leaves Left, in July 1969. The recording sessions and post-production of the album were difficult due to creative differences between Drake and production personnel. Five Leaves Left also received poor marketing from Island and mixed reviews from critics. In March 1971, Drake released his second studio album, Bryter Layter, which featured a more up-tempo and jazz influenced sound. Joe Boyd described that the album had "more of a pop sound" and "imagined it as more commercial". The album sold fewer than 3,000 copies upon its release and received mixed reviews.

Drake suffered from depression following the commercial failure of his first two releases. However, in October 1971 Drake began recording with producer John Wood, who had been the engineer on Drake's first two albums. Recorded at two midnight sessions at Sound Techniques in London, the sessions resulted in Drake's third and final studio album, Pink Moon. It was released in February 1972 and despite poor sales, received positive critical acclaim. Drake attempted to record a fourth studio album in early 1974, just months prior to his death on 25 November.

Drake failed to reach a wide audience during his lifetime but has since gained wider recognition. Compilations of his music have charted worldwide—including the United Kingdom, Belgium, Ireland and the United States—and rereleases of his singles have entered into the UK Singles Chart. All three of Drake's studio albums, and the compilation album Way to Blue: An Introduction to Nick Drake, have been certified gold by the British Phonographic Industry.

== Albums ==
=== Studio albums ===
List of studio albums, with certifications
Title	Album details	Peak chart positions			Certifications (sales thresholds)
Title	Album details	UK	FRA	ITA	Certifications (sales thresholds)
Five Leaves Left	Released: July 1969; Label: Island (9105); Formats: CD, digital download, LP	85 (Note: chart position from 2025)	—	—	UK: Platinum
Bryter Layter	Released: 5 March 1971; Label: Island (9134); Formats: CD, digital download, LP	—	—	—	UK: Gold
Pink Moon	Released: 25 February 1972; Label: Island (9184); Formats: CD, digital download, LP	—	178 (Note: chart position from 2016)	81 (Note: chart position from 2010)	UK: Gold

=== Compilation albums ===
List of compilation albums, with peak chart positions and certifications
Title	Album details	Peak chart positions			Certifications (sales thresholds)
Title	Album details	UK	IRL	US Indie	Certifications (sales thresholds)
Nick Drake	Released: August 1971 (US); Label: Island (9307); Formats: LP	—	—	—	
Heaven in a Wild Flower: An Exploration of Nick Drake	Released: 28 May 1985 (UK); Label: Island (9826); Formats: Cassette, LP, CD	—	—	—	
Time of No Reply	Released: March 1987 (UK); Label: Hannibal (1318); Formats: Cassette, CD, LP	—	—	—	
Way to Blue: An Introduction to Nick Drake	Released: 31 May 1994 (UK); Label: Island (74321 21325); Formats: CD	—	—	—	UK: Gold
Made to Love Magic	Released: 24 May 2004 (UK); Label: Island (986 631); Formats: CD, digital download, LP	27	59	—	UK: Silver
A Treasury	Released: 26 October 2004 (UK); Label: Island (986 792); Formats: CD, digital download, LP, SACD	—	—	—	UK: Gold
Family Tree	Released: 10 July 2007 (UK); Label: Island (1734 041), Sunbeam (5011), Tsunami Label Group (0003); Formats: 2×LP, CD, digital download	—	—	35	
The Making of Five Leaves Left	Released: 25 July 2025; Label: Universal Music; Formats: 4×LP, 4×CD, streaming	—	—	—	
"—" denotes a release that did not chart.

=== Live albums ===
List of live albums
Title	Album details
The John Peel Session	Released: 17 November 2014; Label: Universal Music Catalogue; Formats: Digital download, LP

== Box sets ==
Title	Album details	Peak chart positions
Title	Album details	BEL
Fruit Tree	Released: 9 March 1979 (UK); Label: Island (1745700); Formats: 3×LP, 4×CD, 4×LP	92 (Note: chart position from 2007)
Tuck Box	Released: 9 December 2013 (UK); Label: Island (0602537538546); Formats: 5×CD	—
"—" denotes a release that did not chart.

== Singles ==
=== Retail singles ===
List of retail singles, with peak chart positions
Title	Year	Peak chart positions	Album
Title	Year	UK	Album
"Magic"	2004	32	Made to Love Magic
"River Man"	2004	48	Made to Love Magic

=== Promotional singles ===
List of promotional singles
Title	Year	Album	Ref
"Northern Sky"	1993	Way to Blue: – An Introduction to Nick Drake	
"Pink Moon"	2000	Pink Moon	
"Plaisir d'amour"	2012	Non-album single	

== Video albums ==
List of video albums
Title	Album details
A Skin Too Few: The Days of Nick Drake	Released: 4 December 2007 (UK) (Note: A Skin Too Few: The Days of Nick Drake was originally a BBC Four documentary, initially broadcast in 2002. It was later released as a video album with limited repressings of Fruit Tree in 2007.); Label: Island (006025 1745700); Format: DVD

== Compilation appearances ==
List of appearances on various artist compilation albums
Song	Year	Album	Notes	Ref
"Time Has Told Me"	1969	Nice Enough to Eat	From Five Leaves Left	
"Hazey Jane I"	1970	Bumpers	From Bryter Layter	
"One of These Things First"	1971	El Pea	From Bryter Layter	
"Road"	1994	Folk Routes	From Pink Moon	
"Three Hours"	1995	Troubadours of British Folk, Vol.2: Folk into Rock	From Five Leaves Left	
"Pink Moon"	2001	As Seen on TV: Songs from Commercials	From Pink Moon	
"Northern Sky"	2005	Anthems in Eden: An Anthology of British & Irish Folk 1955–1978	From Bryter Layter	
"River Man"	2005	Late Night Tales: The Flaming Lips	From Five Leaves Left	
"Hazey Jane II"	2005	Acoustic 05	From Bryter Layter	
"Time Has Told Me"	2006	The Acoustic Album	From Five Leaves Left	
"One of These Things First"	2007	Four Decades of Folk Rock	From Bryter Layter	

== Soundtrack appearances ==
List of appearances on film and television soundtrack albums
Song	Year	Appears in	Notes	Ref
"River Man"	1997	Dream with the Fishes	From Five Leaves Left	
"Horn"	1997	Star Maps	From Pink Moon	
"Road"	1998	Hideous Kinky	From Pink Moon	
"Black Eyed Dog"	1998	Practical Magic	From Time of No Reply	
"Northern Sky"	2001	Serendipity	From Bryter Layter	
"Fly"	2001	The Royal Tenenbaums	From Bryter Layter	
"Cello Song"	2001	Me Without You	From Five Leaves Left	
"One of These Things First"	2004	Garden State	From Bryter Layter	
"Northern Sky"	2005	Fever Pitch	From Bryter Layter	
"Time Has Told Me"	2006	The Lake House	From Five Leaves Left	
"Pink Moon"	2006	The Lake House	From Pink Moon	
"Pink Moon"	2007	Driving Lessons	From Pink Moon	
"Poor Boy"	2008	What Just Happened	From Bryter Layter	
"One of These Things First"	2008	Seven Pounds	From Bryter Layter	
"Road"	2009	Bandslam	From Pink Moon	
"Pink Moon"	2011	The Way	From Pink Moon	
"Time of No Reply"	2016	This Is Us	From Time of No Reply	
"Northern Sky"	2019	A Beautiful Day in the Neighborhood	From Bryter Layter	
