= List of songs recorded by Nick Drake =

Nick Drake (1948–1974) was an English folk musician who recorded 78 songs during his short career. Of those 78, only 31 were officially released during his lifetime. Drake's music went largely unnoticed during his lifetime, largely due to his reluctance to perform live or give interviews; it wasn't until decades after his death that his music grew in stature and has achieved widespread recognition.

Drake released three albums during his lifetime: Five Leaves Left (1969), Bryter Layter (1971), and Pink Moon (1972). Five Leaves Left and Bryter Layter were both produced by Joe Boyd and each featured backing musicians. Pink Moon, on the other hand, was produced by John Wood and featured no backing musicians, just Drake solely.

== List ==
Key
†	Indicates compilation album track only
‡	Indicates song not written solely by Nick Drake
	Indicates unreleased song

Name of song, writer, producer(s), original release, and year of release
Song	Writer	Producer(s)	Original release	Year	Ref.
"All My Trials" † (Nick Drake & Gabrielle Drake)	Traditional ‡	–	Family Tree	2007	
"At the Chime of a City Clock"	Nick Drake	Joe Boyd	Bryter Layter	1971	
"Been Smoking Too Long" †	Robin Frederick ‡	Joe Boyd; Frank Kornelussen	Time of No Reply	1987	
"Betty and Dupree" †	Chuck Willis ‡	–	Family Tree	2007	
"Bird Flew By" † "Bird's Eye View" "Strange Meeting I"	Nick Drake	–	Family Tree	2007	
"Black Eyed Dog" †	Nick Drake	Joe Boyd; Frank Kornelussen	Time of No Reply	1987	
"Black Mountain Blues" †	Traditional ‡	–	Family Tree	2007	
"Blossom" † "Blossom Friend" "The Blossom" "You And The Blossom" "The Season"	Nick Drake	–	Family Tree	2007	
"Blue Season"	Nick Drake	–	–	Unreleased	
"Blues Run the Game" †	Jackson C. Frank ‡	–	Family Tree	2007	
"Bryter Layter"	Nick Drake	Joe Boyd	Bryter Layter	1971	
"'Cello Song" "Strange Face" †	Nick Drake	Joe Boyd	Five Leaves Left	1969	
"Clothes of Sand" †	Nick Drake	Joe Boyd; Frank Kornelussen	Time of No Reply	1987	
"Cocaine Blues" †	Traditional ‡	–	Family Tree	2007	
"Come Into the Garden (Introduction)" †	Nick Drake	–	Family Tree	2007	
"Day Is Done"	Nick Drake	Joe Boyd	Five Leaves Left	1969	
“Even Now“	Nick Drake	–	–	Unreleased	
"Fly"	Nick Drake	Joe Boyd	Bryter Layter	1971	
"Forgotten Dream City"	Nick Drake	–	–	Unreleased	
"Free Ride"	Nick Drake	John Wood	Pink Moon	1972	
"From the Morning"	Nick Drake	John Wood	Pink Moon	1972	
"Fruit Tree"	Nick Drake	Joe Boyd	Five Leaves Left	1969	
"Girl Above"	Nick Drake	–	–	Unreleased	
"Hanging on a Star" †	Nick Drake	Joe Boyd; Frank Kornelussen	Time of No Reply	1987	
"Harvest Breed"	Nick Drake	John Wood	Pink Moon	1972	
"Hazey Jane I"	Nick Drake	Joe Boyd	Bryter Layter	1971	
"Hazey Jane II"	Nick Drake	Joe Boyd	Bryter Layter	1971	
"Here Come the Blues" †	Jackson C. Frank ‡	–	Family Tree	2007	
"Horn"	Nick Drake	John Wood	Pink Moon	1972	
"If You Leave Me" †	Traditional arr. by Dave Van Ronk ‡	–	Family Tree	2007	
"Introduction"	Nick Drake	Joe Boyd	Bryter Layter	1971	
"Joey" †	Nick Drake	Joe Boyd; Frank Kornelussen	Time of No Reply	1987	
“Just Another Girl“	Nick Drake	–	–	Unreleased	
"Kegelstatt Trio" † (feat. the Family Trio)	Wolfgang Amadeus Mozart ‡	–	Family Tree	2007	
"Kimbie" †	Traditional arr. by Jackson C. Frank ‡	–	Family Tree	2007	
"Know"	Nick Drake	John Wood	Pink Moon	1972	
“Long Way To Town“	Nick Drake	–	–	Unreleased	
"Magic" "I Was Made to Love Magic" †	Nick Drake	Joe Boyd; Frank Kornelussen	Time of No Reply	1987	
"Man in a Shed" "Sad Song For Christopher"	Nick Drake	Joe Boyd	Five Leaves Left	1969	
"Mayfair" †	Nick Drake	Joe Boyd; Frank Kornelussen	Time of No Reply	1987	
"Mickey's Tune" †	Nick Drake	John Wood; Paul De Rivaz	The Making of Five Leaves Left	2025	
"Milk and Honey" †	Jackson C. Frank ‡	–	Family Tree	2007	
"My Baby So Sweet" †	Traditional arr. by Blind Boy Fuller ‡	–	Family Tree	2007	
"Northern Sky"	Nick Drake	Joe Boyd	Bryter Layter	1971	
“Old Fairytale“	Nick Drake	–	–	Unreleased	
“On This Day“	Nick Drake	–	–	Unreleased	
"One of These Things First"	Nick Drake	Joe Boyd	Bryter Layter	1971	
"Outside"	Nick Drake	–	–	Unreleased	
"Paddling in Rushmere" †	Traditional ‡	–	Family Tree	2007	
“Paid Brain“	Nick Drake	–	–	Unreleased	
"Parasite"	Nick Drake	John Wood	Pink Moon	1972	
"Pink Moon"	Nick Drake	John Wood	Pink Moon	1972	
"Place to Be"	Nick Drake	John Wood	Pink Moon	1972	
"Poor Boy"	Nick Drake	Joe Boyd	Bryter Layter	1971	
"Rain" † "My Love Left With The Rain" "Thoughts Of Rain"	Nick Drake	–	Family Tree	2007	
"Rider on the Wheel" †	Nick Drake	Joe Boyd; Frank Kornelussen	Time of No Reply	1987	
"River Man"	Nick Drake	Joe Boyd	Five Leaves Left	1969	
"Road"	Nick Drake	John Wood	Pink Moon	1972	
"Saturday Sun"	Nick Drake	Joe Boyd	Five Leaves Left	1969	
“Saw You On A Starship“	Nick Drake	–	–	Unreleased	
“Sing A Song“	Nick Drake	–	–	Unreleased	
"Sketch 1" †	Nick Drake	–	Family Tree	2007	
"Strange Meeting II" † "Princess Of The Sand"	Nick Drake	Joe Boyd; Frank Kornelussen	Time of No Reply	1987	
"Strolling Down the Highway" †	Bert Jansch ‡	–	Family Tree	2007	
"Sunday" "Green Sunday"	Nick Drake	Joe Boyd	Bryter Layter	1971	
"They're Leaving Me Behind" † "The Tramp"	Nick Drake	–	Family Tree	2007	
"Things Behind the Sun"	Nick Drake	John Wood	Pink Moon	1972	
"The Thoughts of Mary Jane"	Nick Drake	Joe Boyd	Five Leaves Left	1969	
"Three Hours" "Sundown"	Nick Drake	Joe Boyd	Five Leaves Left	1969	
"Time Has Told Me"	Nick Drake	Joe Boyd	Five Leaves Left	1969	
"Time of No Reply" †	Nick Drake	Joe Boyd; Frank Kornelussen	Time of No Reply	1987	
"Time Piece" †	Nick Drake	–	Family Tree	2007	
"Tomorrow Is a Long Time" †	Bob Dylan ‡	–	Family Tree	2007	
"Tow the Line" †	Nick Drake	Joe Boyd	Made to Love Magic	2004	
"Voice from the Mountain" "Voices"†	Nick Drake	Joe Boyd; Frank Kornelussen	Time of No Reply	1987	
"Way to Blue"	Nick Drake	Joe Boyd	Five Leaves Left	1969	
"Which Will"	Nick Drake	John Wood	Pink Moon	1972	
"Winter Is Gone" †	Traditional ‡	–	Family Tree	2007	
