= Heaven in a Wild Flower =

Compilation album by Nick Drake
- Released: 28 May 1985
- Recorded: 1968–1971
- Genre: Folk
- Length: 48:35
- Label: Island
- Producer: Joe Boyd / John Wood

Nick Drake chronology
Fruit Tree (1978)	Heaven in a Wild Flower (1985)	Time of No Reply (1987)

Professional ratings
Review scores
Source	Rating
AllMusic	3/5 stars

Heaven in a Wild Flower is a 1985 compilation album featuring tracks by English singer/songwriter Nick Drake, taken from Five Leaves Left, Bryter Layter and Pink Moon. The title of the compilation is taken from the lines of William Blake poem Auguries of Innocence. The album does not feature any of Drake's posthumously released material and because of the availability of more comprehensive compilations, such as Way to Blue and Fruit Tree, this collection is largely out of print.

== Track listing ==
All songs by Nick Drake.

1. "Fruit Tree" – 4:49
2. "Cello Song" – 4:48
3. "The Thoughts of Mary Jane" – 3:20
4. "Northern Sky" – 3:46
5. "River Man" – 4:20
6. "At the Chime of a City Clock" – 4:47
7. "Introduction" – 1:31
8. "Hazey Jane I" – 4:31
9. "Hazey Jane II" – 3:46
10. "Pink Moon" – 2:04
11. "Road" – 2:01
12. "Which Will" – 2:58
13. "Things Behind the Sun" – 3:56
14. "Time Has Told Me" – 4:23

== Personnel ==
Nick Drake performs vocals and acoustic guitar on all songs and piano on "Pink Moon".

Also featured (on various songs):

- Robert Kirby – String arrangements
- Richard Thompson – Guitar
- John Cale – Organ, celeste
- Chris McGregor – Piano
- Paul Harris – Piano
- Danny Thompson – Double bass
- Dave Pegg – Bass
- Ed Carter – Bass
- Mike Kowalski – Drums
- Rocky Dzidzornu – Conga, shaker
- Doris Troy – Backing vocals
- P.P. Arnold – Backing vocals
- Patrick Arnold – Backing vocals
- Ray Warleigh – Saxophone
