= Tuck Box =

Box set by Nick Drake
- Released: 9 December 2013
- Genre: Contemporary folk
- Length: 214:48
- Label: Island

Nick Drake chronology
Family Tree (2007)	Tuck Box (2013)	The John Peel Session (2014)

Professional ratings
Aggregate scores
Source	Rating
Metacritic	80/100
Review scores
Source	Rating
AllMusic	4/5 stars
Pitchfork	8.5/10

Tuck Box is a box set by Nick Drake. It was released in December 2013 under Island Records.

== Track listing ==
All tracks written and performed by Nick Drake except where noted.

Disc One (Five Leaves Left)
No.	Title	Length
1.	"Time Has Told Me"	4:25
2.	"River Man"	4:19
3.	"Three Hours"	6:13
4.	"Way to Blue"	3:08
5.	"Day Is Done"	2:26
6.	"'Cello Song"	4:45
7.	"Thoughts of Mary Jane"	3:19
8.	"Man in a Shed"	3:52
9.	"Fruit Tree"	4:46
10.	"Saturday Sun"	4:05

Disc Two (Bryter Layter)
No.	Title	Length
1.	"Introduction"	1:32
2.	"Hazey Jane II"	3:46
3.	"At the Chime of a City Clock"	4:46
4.	"One of These Things First"	4:51
5.	"Hazey Jane I"	4:29
6.	"Bryter Layter"	3:21
7.	"Fly"	2:58
8.	"Poor Boy"	6:07
9.	"Northern Sky"	3:44
10.	"Sunday"	3:43

Disc Three (Pink Moon)
No.	Title	Length
1.	"Pink Moon"	2:03
2.	"Place to Be"	2:41
3.	"Road"	2:00
4.	"Which Will"	2:57
5.	"Horn"	1:21
6.	"Things Behind the Sun"	3:54
7.	"Know"	2:23
8.	"Parasite"	3:34
9.	"Free Ride"	3:04
10.	"Harvest Breed"	1:35
11.	"From the Morning"	2:32

Disc Four (Made to Love Magic)
No.	Title	Length
1.	"Rider on the Wheel"	2:38
2.	"Magic" (was originally called "I Was Made to Love Magic" from Time of No Reply)	2:46
3.	"River Man"	4:01
4.	"Joey"	3:03
5.	"Thoughts of Mary Jane"	3:39
6.	"Mayfair"	2:12
7.	"Hanging on a Star"	3:24
8.	"Three Hours"	5:12
9.	"Clothes of Sand"	2:31
10.	"Voices"	3:45
11.	"Time of No Reply"	2:46
12.	"Black Eyed Dog"	3:28
13.	"Tow the Line"	2:17

Disc Five (Family Tree)
No.	Title	Length
1.	"Come Into the Garden [Introduction]"	0:32
2.	"They're Leaving Me Behind"	3:17
3.	"Time Piece"	0:43
4.	"Poor Mum" (written and performed by Molly Drake (Nick's mother))	1:38
5.	"Winter Is Gone" (Traditional)	2:43
6.	"All My Trials" (Trad.; performed with Gabrielle Drake (Nick's sister))	1:56
7.	"Kegelstatt Trio for Clarinet, Viola and Piano" (Wolfgang Amadeus Mozart; Nick plays clarinet with his aunt and uncle)	1:13
8.	"Strolling Down the Highway" (Bert Jansch)	2:50
9.	"Paddling in Rushmere" (Trad.)	0:24
10.	"Cocaine Blues" (Trad.)	2:59
11.	"Blossom"	2:41
12.	"Been Smokin' Too Long" (Robin Frederick)	2:13
13.	"Black Mountain Blues" (Trad.)	2:37
14.	"Tomorrow Is a Long Time" (Bob Dylan)	3:43
15.	"If You Leave Me" (Trad., arranged by Dave Van Ronk)	2:02
16.	"Here Come the Blues" (Jackson C. Frank)	3:53
17.	"Sketch 1"	1:01
18.	"Blues Run the Game" (Frank)	2:24
19.	"Milk and Honey" (Frank)	2:59
20.	"Kimbie" (Trad., arr. by Frank)	3:26
21.	"Bird Flew By"	2:54
22.	"Rain"	3:08
23.	"Strange Meeting II"	4:26
24.	"Day Is Done [Family Tree version]"	2:20
25.	"Come Into the Garden"	2:00
26.	"Way to Blue [Family Tree version]"	2:50
27.	"Do You Ever Remember?" (written and performed by Molly Drake)	1:35
