= Nick Drake (album) =

Compilation album by Nick Drake
- Released: August 1971
- Recorded: 1968–1970
- Studio: Sound Techniques, London
- Genre: Folk
- Label: Island
- Producer: Joe Boyd

Nick Drake chronology
Bryter Layter (1971)	Nick Drake (1971)	Pink Moon (1972)

Nick Drake is an American-only LP compilation release by English folk musician Nick Drake. It was released in August 1971 as SMAS-9307, shortly after Island Records had started selling their own records in the U.S. At the time, they were distributed by Capitol Records.

The album included three songs from Five Leaves Left and five songs from Bryter Layter, and was packaged in a gatefold sleeve that featured photos by Keith Morris.

== Critical reception ==
Reviewing the album for Rolling Stone, Stephen Holden said, "British singer-songwriter Nick Drake's American debut album is a beautiful and decadent record. A triumph of eclecticism, it successfully brings together varied elements characteristic of the evolution of urban folk rock music during the past five years." Holden described the tunes as "derivative" but "melodically strong and harmonically kinetic", and that they were "enhanced by the brilliant arrangements". He highlighted Drake's lyrics as the album's greatest weakness, but concluded that "the beauty of Drake's voice is its own justification. May it become familiar to us all."

Billboard stated, "From the opening tune, "Cello Song", Nick Drake has established his past, present and future, as he blends with the finest taste, the elements of jazz, classical and pop music with a mellow voice which whispers its message and soothes the ears of the listener."

== Track listing ==
All songs are written by Nick Drake.

Side one

1. "Cello Song" – 4:48
2. "Poor Boy" – 6:09
3. "At the Chime of a City Clock" – 4:45
4. "Northern Sky" – 3:45

Side two

1. "River Man" – 4:22
2. "Three Hours" – 6:15
3. "One of These Things First" – 4:51
4. "Fly" – 3:00

== Personnel ==
- Nick Drake – vocals, guitar, piano
- Rocky Dzidzornu – percussion
- Mike Kowalski – drums
- Clare Lowther – cello
- Dave Pegg – bass
- Danny Thompson – bass
- Ed Carter – bass
- Chris McGregor – piano
- John Cale – piano, celeste, organ, harpsichord, viola
- Paul Harris – piano
- Ray Warleigh – alto sax
- P.P. Arnold and Doris Troy – backing vocals
- Robert Kirby – string arrangements
- Harry Robinson – string arrangements

Production

- Joe Boyd – producer
- John Wood – engineer
