= A Treasury =

Compilation album by Nick Drake
- Released: 27 September 2004
- Recorded: 1968–1974
- Studio: Sound Techniques, London
- Genre: Folk, folk baroque
- Label: Island
- Producer: Joe Boyd, John Wood

Nick Drake chronology
Made to Love Magic (2004)	A Treasury (2004)	Family Tree (2007)

Singles from A Treasury
- 1. "River Man" Released: 13 September 2004

Professional ratings
Review scores
Source	Rating
AllMusic	3.5/5 stars
Pitchfork Media	3.3/10

A Treasury is a Nick Drake compilation aimed at the audiophile audience. Released in the UK on 27 September 2004 and in the US on 26 October 2004, it was available as both a hybrid multichannel SACD and a 180 gram vinyl LP. To promote the compilation, a single was issued for the song "River Man", released on CD and 7" vinyl in the UK on 13 September 2004. The multichannel (5.1) layer on the SACD was mixed by the original Sound Techniques engineer John Wood, with Clive Gregson. The CD version is 52' 13" in length.

== Track listing ==
1. "Introduction" – 1:31
  from Bryter Layter, 1971
2. "Hazey Jane II" – 3:44
  from Bryter Layter, 1971
3. "River Man" – 4:18
  from Five Leaves Left, 1969
4. "Cello Song" – 4:45
  from Five Leaves Left, 1969
5. "Hazey Jane I" – 4:28
  from Bryter Layter, 1971
6. "Pink Moon" – 2:03
  from Pink Moon, 1972
7. "Poor Boy" – 6:07
  from Bryter Layter, 1971
8. "Magic" – 2:48
  from Made to Love Magic, 2004; originally called "I Was Made to Love Magic" from Time of No Reply, 1986
9. "Place to Be" – 2:42
  from Pink Moon, 1972
10. "Northern Sky" – 3:45
  from Bryter Layter, 1971
11. "Road" – 2:01
  from Pink Moon, 1972
12. "Fruit Tree" – 4:48
  from Five Leaves Left, 1969
13. "Black Eyed Dog" – 3:25
  from Made to Love Magic, 2004
14. "Way to Blue" – 3:10
  from Five Leaves Left, 1969
15. "From the Morning" – 2:30
  from Pink Moon, 1972
16. "Plaisir d'amour" (Hidden bonus track) – 0:46
  recorded during the Pink Moon sessions, 1971; previously unreleased

== Charts ==
Chart performance for A Treasury
Chart (2025)	Peak position
Greek Albums (IFPI)	62

== Certifications ==
Region	Certification	Certified units/sales
United Kingdom (BPI)	Gold	100,000^{‡}
^{‡} Sales+streaming figures based on certification alone.
