= Way to Blue =

Compilation album by Nick Drake
- Released: 31 May 1994
- Recorded: 1968–1974
- Genre: Folk
- Label: Hannibal (US), Island (UK)
- Producer: Joe Boyd / John Wood

Nick Drake chronology
Time of No Reply (1987)	Way to Blue (1994)	Made to Love Magic (2004)

Professional ratings
Review scores
Source	Rating
Allmusic	5/5 stars
Answers.com	5/5 stars
New Musical Express	9/10
Rolling Stone	favourable

Way to Blue: An Introduction to Nick Drake is a 1994 compilation album featuring tracks by English singer/songwriter Nick Drake, taken from his original three albums plus Time of No Reply. The album reached gold certificate in the U.K. on 30 September 1999 after selling 100,000 copies. In United States in the year 2000 sales have jumped to 67,916 units.

In Europe, this spawned a series of Introduction to... compilations of various artists in the Universal Music roster.

== Track listing ==
All songs by Nick Drake.

1. "Cello Song" – 4:45
  from Five Leaves Left, 1969
2. "Hazey Jane I" – 4:28
  from Bryter Layter, 1971
3. "Way to Blue" – 3:09
  from Five Leaves Left, 1969
4. "Things Behind the Sun" – 3:56
  from Pink Moon, 1972
5. "River Man" – 4:20
  from Five Leaves Left, 1969
6. "Poor Boy" – 6:06
  from Bryter Layter, 1971
7. "Time of No Reply" – 2:44
  from Time of No Reply, 1987
8. "From the Morning" – 2:30
  from Pink Moon, 1972
9. "One of These Things First" – 4:50
  from Bryter Layter, 1971
10. "Northern Sky" – 3:44
  from Bryter Layter, 1971
11. "Which Will" – 2:56
  from Pink Moon, 1972
12. "Hazey Jane II" – 3:44
  from Bryter Layter, 1971
13. "Time Has Told Me" – 4:25
  from Five Leaves Left, 1969
14. "Pink Moon" – 2:03
  from Pink Moon, 1972
15. "Black Eyed Dog" – 3:25
  from Time of No Reply, 1987
16. "Fruit Tree" – 4:45
  from Five Leaves Left, 1969

== Personnel ==
Nick Drake performs vocals and acoustic guitar on all songs and piano on "Pink Moon".

Also features (on various songs):

- Robert Kirby – String Arrangements
- Richard Thompson – Guitar
- John Cale – Organ, Celeste
- Chris McGregor – Piano
- Paul Harris – Piano
- Danny Thompson – Double Bass
- Dave Pegg – Bass
- Ed Carter – Bass
- Mike Kowalski – Drums
- Rocky Dzidzornu – Conga, Shaker
- Doris Troy – Backing Vocals
- P.P. Arnold – Backing Vocals
- Patrick Arnold – Backing Vocals
- Ray Warleigh – Saxophone
