= Fruit Tree (box set) =

Box set by English singer/songwriter Nick Drake

Box set by Nick Drake
- Released: 9 March 1979
- Recorded: 1968 – February 1974
- Genre: Folk
- Labels: Island; Hannibal
- Producer: Joe Boyd / Various

Nick Drake chronology
Pink Moon (1972)	Fruit Tree (1979)	Heaven in a Wild Flower (1985)

Professional ratings
Review scores
Source	Rating
AllMusic	5/5 stars
Encyclopedia of Popular Music	5/5 stars
Okayplayer	5/5 stars
Pitchfork	8.1/10
Q	3/5 stars

Fruit Tree is a box set by English singer/songwriter Nick Drake. It exists in several versions, all of which feature his three studio albums, plus additional material.

== Versions ==
There are three distinct releases of Fruit Tree.

=== 1979 release ===
The 1979 release, with a full title of Fruit Tree - The Complete Recorded Works, consisted of a UK-only box set of three LPs. The first two were as track-listed below. The third LP comprised Pink Moon (track listing as below) and four previously unreleased bonus tracks. For the 1986 version, the bonus tracks were moved to the last four songs of a fourth disc, Time of No Reply.

This version was released on Island Records with a tree-design box cover and new artwork sleeves for each LP.

=== 1986 release ===
The 1986 version, titled just Fruit Tree, was a 4 LP/CD box set and had the track listing as given below. It consisted of Drake's three studio albums and Time of No Reply, a new fourth disc of previously unreleased material, which was also released as a standalone album in the same year.

This version was released on Hannibal Records, with a Nick Drake photo box cover and original LP jacket designs restored.

=== 2007 release ===
The 2007 box set contains Drake's three studio albums (as per the first three albums of the 1986 release) remastered, along with a DVD of A Skin Too Few: The Days of Nick Drake, a 48-minute documentary made by Dutch filmmaker Jeroen Berkvens in 2000.

This version was released on Island Records, with the 1979 tree-design box cover but the original LP jacket designs restored.

== Track listing ==
All songs written by Nick Drake, except disc 4, track 9 ("Been Smoking Too Long" by Robin Frederick).

=== Disc One: Five Leaves Left ===
1. "Time Has Told Me" – 4:27
2. "River Man" – 4:21
3. "Three Hours" – 6:16
4. "Way to Blue" – 3:05
5. "Day Is Done" – 2:22
6. "Cello Song" – 3:58
7. "The Thoughts of Mary Jane" – 3:12
8. "Man in a Shed" – 3:49
9. "Fruit Tree" – 4:42
10. "Saturday Sun" – 4:00

=== Disc Two: Bryter Layter ===
1. "Introduction" – 1:33
2. "Hazey Jane II" – 3:46
3. "At the Chime of a City Clock" – 4:47
4. "One of These Things First" – 4:52
5. "Hazey Jane I" – 4:31
6. "Bryter Layter" – 3:24
7. "Fly" – 3:00
8. "Poor Boy" – 6:09
9. "Northern Sky" – 3:47
10. "Sunday" – 3:42

=== Disc Three: Pink Moon ===
1. "Pink Moon" – 2:06
2. "Place to Be" – 2:44
3. "Road" – 2:02
4. "Which Will" – 2:59
5. "Horn" – 1:23
6. "Things Behind the Sun" – 3:56
7. "Know" – 2:27
8. "Parasite" – 3:36
9. "Free Ride" – 3:05
10. "Harvest Breed" – 1:38
11. "From the Morning" – 2:31

In the 3-LP 1979 version, disc 3 also included the last four tracks of disc 4 below (set in a different running order of 14, 11, 12, 13).

=== Disc Four (1986): Time of No Reply ===
1. "Time of No Reply" – 2:52
2. "I Was Made to Love Magic" – 3:08
3. "Joey" – 3:04
4. "Clothes of Sand" – 2:32
5. "Man in a Shed" (alt. rec.) – 3:02
6. "Mayfair" – 2:28
7. "Fly" (alt. rec.) – 3:35
8. "The Thoughts of Mary Jane" (alt. rec.) – 3:42
9. "Been Smoking Too Long" (Robin Frederick) – 2:13
10. "Strange Meeting II" – 3:32
11. "Rider on the Wheel" – 2:30
12. "Black Eyed Dog" – 3:20
13. "Hanging on a Star" – 2:42
14. "Voice from a Mountain" – 3:40

=== Disc Four (2007): A Skin Too Few: The Days of Nick Drake (DVD) ===
A 48-minute biographical documentary made by Dutch filmmaker Jeroem Berkvens in 2000, with excerpts from:

1. "Introduction"
2. "Hazey Jane I"
3. "How Wild the Wind Blows"
4. "River Man"
5. "At the Chime of a City Clock"
6. "Day Is Done"
7. "Know"
8. "Hanging on a Star"
9. "From the Morning"
10. "Northern Sky"
