= Pink Moon (disambiguation) =

Pink Moon is an indie folk album by English musician Nick Drake.

Pink Moon may also refer to:

- Pink Moon (book), book by Amanda Petrusich with the Nick Drake album as its subject
- Pink Moon, a rock music album by Canadian post-hardcore band Silverstein
