= Robin Frederick =

American songwriter

- Born: 1947 (age 78–79)
- Education: Palos Verdes High School
- Occupation: Author

Robin Frederick (born 1947) is an American songwriter, author and children's television contributor. She is a former director of A&R and production for Rhino Records and Executive Producer of over 60 albums. She has written and produced more than 500 songs for television, records, theater, and audio products. She is the former Vice President of the Los Angeles chapter of the Recording Academy and former president of Los Angeles Women in Music (LAWIM).

== Early life ==
Frederick was born in Burbank, California, United States. She was raised in Florida, but later moved back to California where she attended Palos Verdes High School. She began writing her own songs on guitar and piano from the age of 15.

== Songwriting career ==
=== Nick Drake and "Been Smoking Too Long" ===
Between August 1966 and June 1967, Frederick lived in Aix-en-Provence and attended university there. In March 1967 she was performing folk song originals and covers with a partner in a cabaret in Aix. After one show Nick Drake introduced himself and asked if Frederick would like to get together to play some songs. Among the songs she played for him was an original composition, "Been Smoking Too Long". She and Drake became friends and Drake asked for the lyrics to the song. He recorded the song on a home demo tape recorded for his parents later in 1967.

The song appeared on the Time of No Reply album as well as the 2007 Family Tree collection of Drake's home and demo recordings. The song has been covered by several notable artists including Placebo, Graham Coxon, Alison Faith Levy, Steve Balbi and Hederos & Hellberg. Frederick also contributed liner notes to the Fruit Tree box set.

=== John Martyn and Bridget St John ===
In the summer of 1967 Frederick met John Martyn. In an article for Mojo, Frederick explains how she spent the summer of 1967 in London with Martyn, "listening to Sgt. Pepper's and the Incredible String Band". She describes "watching John learn to play sitar in about ten minutes, living on toast and tea while he recorded London Conversation. Martyn would record Frederick's "Sandy Grey" which she had originally written for Nick Drake.

Whilst living in Aix-en-Provence, Frederick also met Bridget St John. Frederick later wrote "This Is the Story" for the two of them to sing. It was released in 2010 on Hello Again - A Collection of Rare Tracks.

=== Solo work ===
Frederick released the "I Know Who I Am" single in 1977 on Ultimathule records. The song was written by Alan O'Day. In 1992 Frederick released a solo album entitled How Far? How Fast? via Higher Octave Music. She wrote and sang all material and was co-producer along with Ken Caillat. In 2000 Frederick released the Water Falls Down album. In 2003 Frederick released the Blue Flame album.

== Children’s television and audio products ==
Frederick wrote and produced several songs for the Disney Channel television series Welcome to Pooh Corner and Dumbo's Circus. She also wrote music and lyrics for the theme song ("Just You and Me, Kid") of the Disney Channel television series You and Me Kid. Frederick was co-writer, along with Ken Caillat, of the music tracks for the Photon Laser Tag game.

Between 1985 and 1987 Frederick (along with Jay Tverdak) wrote and produced songs as well as the scripts for the talking doll Cricket. She was the songwriter, producer and voice director as well as a contributing songwriter for the 1991 album Disney's Twelve Days of Christmas, 1992's The Little Mermaid: Songs from the Sea and Mickey Unrapped (1994), which featured Whoopi Goldberg. All were released on Walt Disney Records.

== Songwriting books and articles ==
Frederick credits the study of Nick Drake’s songs for her transition into songwriting books. She has written: “I became intrigued, almost obsessed, with his songs. After years of playing his albums, I began to hear, for the first time, what he was really doing. His use of melody and chords was far ahead of his time and was a revelation to me. I began to look for a way to fold his ideas into my own music and to communicate my discoveries to others.”

Frederick’s first songwriting book was 2008’s Shortcuts to Hit Songwriting. Published by TAXI Music Books, the book was praised by Kara DioGuardi, and Jason Blume who said the book, "Should be in every songwriter's arsenal." Frederick has since released, Shortcuts to Songwriting for Film & TV in 2010, The 30-Minute Songwriter (2014), and Song Starters: 365 Lyric, Melody, & Chord Ideas to Kickstart Your Songwriting (2016). In 2019 Frederick released Shortcuts to Hit Songwriting Levels One, Two and Three via TAXI Music Books. She has contributed articles to Recording Magazine and Keyboard Magazine. Frederick also contributed an essay titled ‘Anatomy of a Hit Song’ to 2016’s Songwriter’s Market, 40th Edition.

== Selected production credits ==
Notable compilations

- Animaniacs - Variety Pack (Kid Rhino, 1995)
- Hanna-Barbera Classics, Vol. 1 (Rhino Records, 1995)
- Bugs & Friends Sing the Beatles (Kid Rhino, 1995)
- MAD Magazine – MAD Grooves (Kid Rhino, 1996)
- Sailor Moon – Songs From The Hit TV Series (Kid Rhino, 1996)
- Basketball's Greatest Hoop Hits (Rhino Records, 1998)
- Schoolhouse Rock! Lunchbox Set (Kid Rhino, 2000)
