= Serendipity (film) =

2001 film by Peter Chelsom

- Theatrical release poster
- Directed by: Peter Chelsom
- Written by: Marc Klein
- Produced by: Peter Abrams; Robert L. Levy; Simon Fields
- Starring: John Cusack; Kate Beckinsale; Molly Shannon; Jeremy Piven; Bridget Moynahan; Eugene Levy
- Cinematography: John de Borman
- Edited by: Christopher Greenbury
- Music by: Alan Silvestri
- Production company: Tapestry Films
- Distributed by: Miramax Films
- Release dates: September 13, 2001 (TIFF); October 5, 2001 (United States)
- Running time: 91 minutes
- Country: United States
- Language: English
- Budget: $28 million
- Box office: $77.5 million

Serendipity is a 2001 American romantic comedy film directed by Peter Chelsom, written by Marc Klein, and starring John Cusack and Kate Beckinsale. The film grossed $77.5 million on a $28 million budget.

== Plot ==
While Christmas shopping at Bloomingdale's in New York City, Jonathan Trager meets Sara Thomas, a British woman, when both try to buy the same pair of gloves. Despite both being in relationships, a mutual attraction leads them to have dessert at a restaurant called Serendipity 3 where Sara explains that she lets fate's "little signals" determine many of her life decisions.

After separating, they meet again when each returns to the restaurant to retrieve something they forgot. Jonathan convinces Sara to give him her phone number, but when the wind blows it out of his grasp, Sara thinks it is fate telling them to back off. Jonathan disagrees and Sara decides to let fate reunite them: she has Jonathan write his number on a five-dollar bill which she uses to buy breath mints, and promises to sell her copy of Love in the Time of Cholera, in which she will write her name and number, to a used bookstore.

As one last experiment, Sara tosses Jonathan one of the gloves. They board separate elevators in the Waldorf Astoria and agree that if they arrive on the same floor, they are meant to be together. They each pick the same floor, but Jonathan is delayed when a child on his elevator presses random buttons. Sara believes that the experiment failed.

Seven years later, Jonathan is an ESPN producer about to marry Halley, and Sara is a therapist living in San Francisco, newly engaged to a musician, Lars. Jonathan accidentally finds his glove and goes out with his friend Dean to find Sara. Meanwhile, Sara, stressed by the wedding planning and Lars's focus on an upcoming world tour, travels to New York with her best friend Eve to find Jonathan.

After nearly crossing paths with Jonathan throughout the day, Sara and Eve have dessert at Serendipity where Eve convinces Sara to give up; unnoticed by them, Eve's change contains the five-dollar bill with Jonathan's number. They catch the same cab Jonathan and Dean rode in earlier. After finding that a roommate finder service next to Serendipity that Sara once used is now a bridal shop, Jonathan sees it as a sign that he should marry Halley.

At the Waldorf Astoria, Sara and Eve encounter Halley headed to the wedding rehearsal. Halley invites Eve to join her since they were friends in college, but Sara declines. Outside their room, she finds an apologetic Lars.

At the rehearsal, Jonathan's distracted demeanor frustrates Halley, who pleads with him to focus on the wedding. Halley then gives him Sara's old copy of Love in the Time of Cholera as a wedding gift. Jonathan and Dean use Sara's phone number to obtain her address and fly to San Francisco. Once there, they see Sara's sister and her boyfriend having sex and assume it is Sara in a happy relationship. Dean helps Jonathan realize that he should not marry Halley while Sara decides to end her engagement to Lars.

The next day, as her flight home is about to depart, Sara finds the five-dollar bill with Jonathan's number on it, having gotten hers and Eve's wallets mixed up. After obtaining his address and being told by the building superintendent of his wedding at the Waldorf, Sara hurries there and is relieved to find the ceremony has been canceled.

Dean reassures Jonathan that he did the right thing and vows to be more spontaneous in his own marriage, which has been on the rocks. Jonathan wanders to the same ice skating rink where he spent part of his evening with Sara seven years earlier and finds a leather jacket on a bench. As it begins to snow, he lies on his back in the middle of the rink with the jacket as a pillow next to one of the pair of gloves. When the matching glove lands on his chest, he sits up and finds Sara watching him, having come to claim her jacket. They introduce themselves and finally share a kiss. Some time later, they celebrate their anniversary at Bloomingdale's in front of the display of gloves where they met.

== Cast ==
- John Cusack as Jonathan Trager
- Kate Beckinsale as Sara Thomas
- Molly Shannon as Eve
- Jeremy Piven as Dean Kansky
- John Corbett as Lars Hammond
- Bridget Moynahan as Halley Buchanan
- Eugene Levy as Bloomingdale's salesman (Macall Polay)
- Marcia Bennett as Mrs. Trager
- Eve Crawford as Mrs. Buchanan
- Lucy Gordon as Caroline Mitchell, Sara's sister
- Kevin Rice as Kip, Caroline's boyfriend
- Leo Fitzpatrick as leasing office temp
- Buck Henry as himself (uncredited)

== Production ==
Serendipity was shot in New Jersey, New York City, Ontario, and San Francisco in the summer of 2000. Following the September 11 attacks, images of the World Trade Center towers were digitally removed from all skyline shots of New York City. Jennifer Aniston was offered the role of Sara Thomas but turned it down to avoid being typecast in romantic comedies. Carla Gugino and Claire Forlani auditioned for the role of Sara Thomas.

== Release ==
Serendipity premiered at the 2001 Toronto International Film Festival. The film opened at number two at the US box office earning $13.3 million on its opening weekend, behind Training Day. With an estimated budget of $28 million, this was the first of Chelsom's films to turn a profit. After some of the biggest commercial failures of all time (Town & Country), Serendipity marked the first of several box-office successes for Chelsom, peaking in 2009 with Hannah Montana: The Movie. The film grossed $50.3 million at the domestic box office and $27.2 million internationally for a worldwide total of $77.5 million.

== Reception ==
On the review aggregator website Rotten Tomatoes, the film holds an approval rating of 58% based on 138 reviews, with an average rating of 5.8/10. The website's critics consensus reads, "Light and charming, Serendipity could benefit from less contrivances." Metacritic, which uses a weighted average, assigned the film a score of 52 out of 100, based on 33 critics, indicating "mixed or average" reviews. Audiences polled by CinemaScore gave the film an average grade of "B+" on an A+ to F scale. Roger Ebert gave the film one-and-a-half out of four stars. Elvis Mitchell of The New York Times gave it a mixed review and compared it to cinematic candyfloss.

== Home media ==
Serendipity was released on DVD on April 9, 2002 by Buena Vista Home Entertainment (under the Miramax Home Entertainment banner). The special features for the 2002 Serendipity DVD included a director's commentary, deleted scenes, an on-set diary, and a storyboard comparison.

On April 10, 2012, Lionsgate Home Entertainment released Serendipity on Blu-ray. Paramount Home Entertainment reissued the film on DVD and Blu-ray on September 22, 2020, with this being one of many Miramax titles that they reissued around this time. They went on to make the film available on their subscription streaming service Paramount+, as well as on their free streaming service Pluto TV. In Australia, it was also on the streaming service for the Paramount-owned broadcaster Network 10.

== Music ==
Serendipity: Music from the Miramax Motion Picture

Soundtrack album by various artists
- Released: October 5, 2001
- Labels: Sony Music Soundtrax; Columbia

The soundtrack contains popular music by various artists, with one track from the musical score, composed and conducted by Alan Silvestri.

1. "Never a Day" – Wood
2. "Moonlight Kiss" – Bap Kennedy
3. "January Rain" – David Gray
4. "Waiting in Vain" – Annie Lennox
5. "The Distance" – Evan & Jaron
6. "Like Lovers Do" – Heather Nova
7. "When You Know" – Shawn Colvin
8. "Northern Sky" – Nick Drake
9. "Cool Yule" – Louis Armstrong
10. "This Year" – Chantal Kreviazuk
11. "(There's) Always Something There to Remind Me" – Brian Whitman
12. "'83" – John Mayer
13. "Fast Forward" – Alan Silvestri

Songs featured in the film that are not included on the soundtrack album include:

- "Sara Smile" – Daryl Hall & John Oates
- "From Rusholme with Love" (Serendipity Mix) – Mint Royale
- "Black Eyed Dog" – Nick Drake
- "Rose Rouge" – St. Germain
- "Charley's Prelude" – Don Byron
- "Shake It Off" – Jarvis Church
- "I'm Still in Love" – CoCo Lee (Asian film theme song)

== Television adaptation ==
In 2019, a television series inspired by the film was reported to be in development for NBC. As of 2023, there have been no further developments.

== Remake ==
In 2026, Amazon MGM Studios announced that Michael Showalter would direct a "modern retelling" of the film. Showalter claimed in a press release that the film would not be a remake or reboot, but a "rebuttal". Original screenwriter Marc Klein will return to write the film. Milo Manheim, Whitney Peak, Stephen Kalyn, Auliʻi Cravalho and Madelyn Cline were later added to the cast.

== See also ==
- Serendipity
- Missed connection, where two people want to reconnect after an initial meeting but neither has the other's contact details.
- List of Christmas films
