= Family Tree (Nick Drake album) =

Compilation album by Nick Drake
- Released: 9 July 2007
- Recorded: Various (1967–1968)
- Genres: Folk, blues, jazz, classical
- Length: 66:10
- Labels: Island (UK CD), Tsunami LG/Fontana (US CD), Sunbeam (UK 2LP)
- Producer: Various,

Nick Drake chronology
A Treasury (2004)	Family Tree (2007)	Tuck Box (2013)

Professional ratings
Review scores
Source	Rating
AllMusic	3.5/5 stars
Pitchfork	7.1/10

Family Tree is a 2007 compilation album of home and demo recordings by English singer/songwriter Nick Drake. The album is notable for the appearance of Nick's sister Gabrielle on one track and the contribution of two original songs performed by Nick's mother, Molly Drake. Recorded before the release of his first album, Five Leaves Left, most of the tracks on the album circulated on bootlegs in the years before the official release from the Drake family. The album reached #35 on Billboard's Top Independent Albums chart, making it Drake's first album to chart in America. The recordings are all from the 1960s, consisting of home recordings by Nick and his father Rodney in Tanworth-in-Arden, England; demos recorded by Nick in Aix en Provence, France; and 1968 demos recorded at Cambridge University by Nick's later frequent collaborator Robert Kirby.

== Track listing ==
All songs written and performed by Nick Drake except where noted.

1. "Come into the Garden (Introduction)" – 0:31
2. "They're Leaving Me Behind" – 3:16
3. "Time Piece" – 0:43
4. "Poor Mum", written and performed by Molly Drake – 1:38
5. "Winter Is Gone" (traditional) – 2:42
6. "All My Trials" (trad.), with Gabrielle Drake – 1:55
7. "Kegelstatt Trio For Clarinet, Viola and Piano" (Wolfgang Amadeus Mozart), Nick on clarinet with his aunt & uncle – 1:14
8. "Betty and Dupree" (Chuck Willis) – 2:17 (only available on the Sunbeam 2xLP UK edition)
9. "Strolling down the Highway" (Bert Jansch) – 2:50
10. "Paddling in Rushmere" (trad.) – 0:24
11. "Cocaine Blues" (trad.) – 2:59
12. "Blossom" – 2:41
13. "Been Smokin' Too Long" (Robin Frederick) – 2:13
14. "Black Mountain Blues" (trad.) – 2:37
15. "Tomorrow Is a Long Time" (Bob Dylan) – 3:40
16. "If You Leave Me" (trad., arranged by Dave Van Ronk) – 2:04
17. "Here Come the Blues" (Jackson C. Frank) – 3:53
18. "Sketch 1" – 0:59
19. "Blues Run the Game" (Frank) – 2:25
20. "My Baby So Sweet" (trad., arr. by Blind Boy Fuller) – 1:45 (only available on certain releases, including the Sunbeam vinyl version and the original pressing of the Island CD version)
21. "Milk and Honey" (Frank) – 3:00
22. "Kimbie" (trad., arr. by Frank) – 3:26
23. "Bird Flew By" – 2:54
24. "Rain" – 3:07
25. "Strange Meeting II" – 4:27
26. "Day Is Done" – 2:20
27. "Come into the Garden" – 1:59
28. "Way to Blue" – 2:51
29. "Do You Ever Remember?", written and performed by Molly Drake – 1:37

== Personnel ==
Nick Drake sings and plays acoustic guitar except on those performed by Molly Drake, and clarinet on the Mozart piece. Gabrielle Drake and Molly Drake appear as noted.
