= Made to Love Magic =

Compilation album by Nick Drake
- Released: 24 May 2004
- Recorded: Various
- Genre: Folk, folk rock
- Length: 41:44
- Label: Island
- Producer: Joe Boyd / Various

Nick Drake chronology
Way to Blue (1994)	Made to Love Magic (2004)	A Treasury (2004)

Professional ratings
Review scores
Source	Rating
AllMusic	3/5 stars
Pitchfork	6.7/10
Rolling Stone	4/5 stars

Made to Love Magic is a 2004 compilation album of outtakes and remixes by English singer/songwriter Nick Drake. It features a previously unreleased solo acoustic version of "River Man", dating from early 1968, and the song "Tow the Line", a previously unheard song from Drake's final session in July 1974. The compilation reached #27 on the UK Albums Chart.

== Track listing ==
All songs are written by Nick Drake.

1. "Rider on the Wheel" – 2:38
2. "Magic – Orchestrated Version 2" – 2:45
3. "River Man – Cambridge Version" – 4:02
4. "Joey" – 3:04
5. "Thoughts of Mary Jane" – 3:39
6. "Mayfair – Cambridge Version" – 2:12
7. "Hanging on a Star" – 3:24
8. "Three Hours – Alternate Version" – 5:12
9. "Clothes of Sand" – 2:31
10. "Voices" – 3:45
11. "Time of No Reply – Orchestrated Version" – 2:47
12. "Black Eyed Dog" – 3:28
13. "Tow the Line" – 2:20

Notes

- Tracks 1, 4, 5, 9 & 12 are stereo remasters from Time of No Reply; track 5 is usually titled "The Thoughts of Mary Jane" on other releases.
- Track 2 is "I Was Made to Love Magic" from Time of No Reply, sped-up, with a posthumously added string arrangement by Robert Kirby
- Tracks 3 and 6 are Cambridge-era dorm demos (spring 1968)
- Track 7 is a different take than the version originally released on Time of No Reply (February 1974)
- Track 8 is a different take than the version originally released on Five Leaves Left, and features Rebop Kwaku Baah on congas (March 1969)
- Track 10 is a remastered version of "Voice from the Mountain" from Time of No Reply
- Track 11 has a posthumously added string arrangement by Robert Kirby
- Track 13 is possibly the last song Drake ever committed to tape (July 1974)

== Personnel ==
Nick Drake performs vocals and steel-string guitar on all songs, except where indicated otherwise.

== Certifications ==
Certifications for Made to Love Magic
Region	Certification	Certified units/sales
United Kingdom (BPI)	Silver	60,000^{‡}
^{‡} Sales+streaming figures based on certification alone.
