= Time of No Reply =

Compilation album by Nick Drake
- Released: March 1986
- Recorded: 1967–1969, 1974
- Genres: Folk, folk rock
- Length: 42:20

Nick Drake chronology
Heaven in a Wild Flower (1985)	Time of No Reply (1986)	Way to Blue (1994)

Professional ratings
Review scores
Source	Rating
AllMusic	3/5 stars

Time of No Reply is a 1986 compilation album featuring outtakes and alternative versions of songs by the English singer-songwriter and musician Nick Drake. It was also included as the fourth disc of the 1979 version of the Nick Drake box set Fruit Tree.

== Track listing ==
All songs written by Nick Drake, except "Been Smoking Too Long," by Robin Frederick.

1. "Time of No Reply" – 2:52
2. "I Was Made to Love Magic" – 3:08
3. "Joey" – 3:04
4. "Clothes of Sand" – 2:32
5. "Man in a Shed" – 3:02
6. "Mayfair" – 2:28
7. "Fly" – 3:35
8. "The Thoughts of Mary Jane" – 3:42
9. "Been Smoking Too Long" – 2:13
10. "Strange Meeting II" – 3:32
11. "Rider on the Wheel" – 2:30
12. "Black Eyed Dog" – 3:20
13. "Hanging on a Star" – 2:42
14. "Voice from a Mountain" – 3:40

Notes

- Tracks 1 to 4 are outtakes (November & December 1968) from the Five Leaves Left sessions.
- Track 5 is an alternate version (October 1968) of a song from the Five Leaves Left sessions.
- Track 6 is an outtake (October 1968) from the Five Leaves Left sessions.
- Tracks 7, 9 & 10 are home recordings from 1967–1969. “Fly” was later re-recorded in 1970 finding a home on “Bryter Layter”
- Track 8 is an alternate version (December 1968) of a song from the Five Leaves Left sessions and features Richard Thompson on guitar.
- Tracks 11 to 14 are the so-called "final four" recordings (February 1974) previously released as bonus tracks on disk#3 of the 1979 version of the box set Fruit Tree, before a fifth recording, "Tow the Line" (July 1974), emerged on Made to Love Magic in 2004.
- Track 14 is also referred to as "Voices" on other releases

== Remaster ==
The Island executive who compiled the Family Tree collection indicated plans to remaster Time of No Reply (which was not originally released on Island, but on Hannibal Records), with a different track listing. This became Made to Love Magic.
