= Magic (Nick Drake song) =

Song by Nick Drake

Single by Nick Drake

from the album Made to Love Magic
- B-side: "Northern Sky"
- Released: 17 May 2004
- Recorded: 1969
- Studio: Sound Techniques
- Genre: Baroque pop
- Length: 6:31
- Label: Island
- Songwriter: Nick Drake
- Producers: Robert Kirby and Joe Boyd

Nick Drake singles chronology
"Magic" (2004)	"River Man" (2004)

"Magic" (also known as "I Was Made to Love Magic") is the second listed song from Nick Drake's 2004 compilation album Made to Love Magic and was remastered and released as a single in 2004. The single was released on both CD and vinyl record formats, with Bryter Layter track "Northern Sky" as a B-side.

"Magic" was originally recorded for the Five Leaves Left sessions but did not appear on the final album. A version of the song with a different string arranger features on Time of No Reply, Drake's 1986 outtakes compilation. For Made to Love Magic the song was artificially sped up and stripped of its original string section, which was scored by Richard Hewson. A separate string arrangement written in 1969 by Robert Kirby, recorded in 2004, was used as a backing to the new faster track. Upon its 2004 issue as a single, it was placed at #32 on the UK Singles Chart, making it Drake's first ever entry on the chart.

== Track listing ==
All songs are written by Nick Drake.

1. "Magic" – 2:45
2. "Northern Sky" – 3:46

== Personnel ==
- Nick Drake – vocals, guitar
- Robert Kirby – arrangements

== Chart ==
Chart (2004)	Peak position
UK Singles (Official Charts)	32
