= Mike Kowalski =

American drummer, percussionist, musicologist (born 1944)

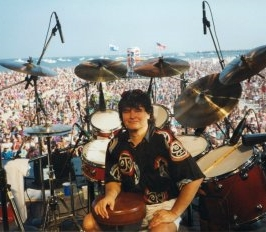
- Drummer Mike Kowalski on stage at his drums during a Beach Boys concert in 1998

Background information
- Born: July 28, 1944 (age 81)
- Origin: Hollywood, California, U.S.
- Genres: Rock, blues, jazz
- Occupations: Drummer; percussionist; musicologist
- Instruments: Drums; piano
- Years active: 1947-Present
- Labels: Mercury; Atco; Island; Epic; RCA; Capitol; Brother Reprise; A&M; MCA; Warner Bros.; Cherry Red

Mike Kowalski (born July 28, 1944) is an American drummer, percussionist and musicologist. He is best known as a longtime touring and session drummer for the rock band the Beach Boys.

== Early career ==
Mike Kowalski was born in Hollywood, California. He started singing and playing piano at the age of three. His first professional engagement was playing boogie-woogie piano with Mel Torme on drums for a television pilot at the age of five, filmed on location at Bimbo's 365 Club in San Francisco. At age ten, he was given a set of Slingerland Radio-King drums by actor Jack Webb of Dragnet, a noted jazz aficionado.

At the age of fifteen, he was playing drums professionally with various local rock and rhythm and blues bands. He performed both on stage and on screen as his family was affiliated with the film and television industries. By age nineteen he was playing drums with Los Angeles-based singers Pat and Lolly Vegas, who later formed the pop/rock group Redbone. Also during this time, Kowalski performed and recorded with Sonny & Cher, Little Anthony & the Imperials and Etta James.

Kowalski, along with the Vegas Brothers and several players from The Wrecking Crew, recorded "Laugh At Me", Sonny Bono's only hit song as a solo artist. Produced by Bono and Snuff Garrett, the song reached the Top 10 in the US, UK, and Canada in August 1965. At age 21, Kowalski was the drummer on that record.

On January 3, 1968, Kowalski flew to London to join guitarist Ed Carter's blues rock band, The New Nadir, with Gary Thain on bass. Over the next several months, The New Nadir performed regularly on the city's club circuit. The trio shared the bill at the Marquee Club with Jethro Tull, Ten Years After, The Nice, the Aynsley Dunbar Retaliation, and the Jeff Beck Group, to name a few. A highlight for Kowalski was at the Speakeasy, when a friend of Carter's sat in with the band. The friend was Jimi Hendrix.

In March, producer Joe Boyd signed The New Nadir to his production company, Witchseason Productions. The New Nadir recorded three songs for Boyd, written by Carter and Peter Dawkins. In May, the group disbanded. Kowalski and Carter returned to Los Angeles, while Thain remained in London, eventually gaining recognition with Keef Hartley and Uriah Heep.

In early 1969, Kowalski lived in Marin County, Sepp Donahower calls. Albert Collins auditioned drummers at the Matrix and Kowalski was hired. He toured with Collins until he left for the UK in the fall. Kowalski and Carter returned to London to fulfill their contract to Witchseason Productions. The album they recorded reflected and combined their passion for Latin jazz, rock and country music.

During this period, Kowalski drummed on albums by John Martyn, Beverley Martyn, Dudu Pukwana, Mike Heron and Nick Drake; all of the aforementioned were signed to Witchseason Productions.

In 1968, Kowalski met Dawn Aston from Kent, England. They were married in California in 1969.

== The Beach Boys and The Backsters ==
In mid-June 1968, the Beach Boys were in the process of adding rhythm and horn sections for their upcoming summer tour. Auditions were held in the afternoon in Hollywood at the Moulin Rouge Supper Club on Sunset Boulevard. Bruce Johnston suggested Ed Carter for bass and guitar, Doug Dragon (Daryl Dragon's older brother) for keyboards, and Kowalski for percussion and drums. The three auditioned and were hired.

In November, Kowalski was called into the studio to play drums on Dennis Wilson's "All I Want to Do". Primarily written and produced by Wilson (with lyrics from poet and band associate Stephen Kalinich), the song was released on 20/20 (1969).

After touring with the group as a percussionist in 1968, Kowalski played his first show on drums at the Big Sur Folk Festival in Monterey, California on October 3, 1970, filling in for Wilson, who was then filming Monte Hellman's Two-Lane Blacktop (1971).

In 1971, Kowalski was again on drums as the Beach Boys performed a slot at the invitation-only closing night of New York City's Fillmore East on June 27 and filmed the NBC special Good Vibrations From Central Park on July 2. Wilson was unable to play drums at both concerts because of a recent hand injury, although he continued to sing and play keyboards.

After the Central Park show, the Beach Boys flew back to Los Angeles. The next day, Kowalski was on a plane to Tokyo, playing drums with The Johnny Otis Show on a tour of the Far East. He would continue to perform with Otis from 1971 to 1974, juggling dates between both bands until 1973.

Three years later, Kowalski rejoined the Beach Boys from 1977 to 1978, sharing drumming responsibilities with Dennis Wilson. He also played drums in Celebration, a Mike Love-led side project with other prominent members. During this period, he played drums on The Beach Boys M.I.U. Album, Celebration's Almost Summer and jazz tenor saxophonist Charles Lloyd's Weavings.

In October 1981, Wilson and percussionist Bobby Figueroa were unable to tour. Kowalski, after a three-year absence from the band, returned to play drums. By the end of the year, Kowalski and Wilson, who was back on drums, performed during the band's controversial holiday engagement in apartheid-era Sun City, South Africa. 1982 had Kowalski playing drums for Mike Love's Endless Summer Beach Band (featuring Dean Torrence), and drums and percussion with The Beach Boys. By March 1983, there were two sets of drums on stage; both Kowalski and Wilson played shows together until Wilson's death on December 28, 1983.

For the next 23 years, Kowalski would tour exclusively with The Beach Boys, playing drums until he parted ways with them in September 2007.

In 1984, Kowalski collaborated with Joel Peskin to create The Backsters. They were signed to A & M Records with Herb Alpert as executive producer. Their album, entitled Get on Your Back, featured many seasoned jazz and blues players. Released in early 1985, their first single was "Handclappin".

== Other bands and performers ==
Kowalski has played with numerous bands and performers; both as a member of the group and as a session musician. Acts Kowalski has played with include:

Albert Collins	Shuggie Otis	Jim O'Keefe
Nino Tempo	Nick Drake	Billy Hinsche
Mike Adams & The Red Jackets	Joe Houston	Big Joe Turner
Roger McGuinn	Barry Mann	Jon Lawton
Brian Wilson	Bumps Blackwell	Adrian Baker
Mark Andes	John Martyn and Beverley Martyn	Don Peake
Gene Vincent	Crazy Horse	Hank Marr
Eddie "Cleanhead" Vinson	Captain and Tennille	Ernie Knapp
Marie Adams	Joe Boyd	Bobby Figueroa
Bruce Johnston	Leon Russell	Mike Meros
Chris Farmer	Lance Carson	Steve Douglas
Mike Ley	George Whitsell	Gary Griffin
Harvey Lane	Steve O'Reilly	Barry Bastian
John Marx	Domenic Genova	Philip Bardowell
Tay Uhler AKA Eddie Sapien	Gary Chang	Scott Lipsker
Chris Mancini 'Rock Island'	Clark Garman	Bobby Jones
Tim Bonhomme	Carl Radle	Rod Armstrong
Scott Engel with The Walker Brothers	Stu Hoffman AKA Barbecue Bob	Dean Torrence
Bobbie Gentry	Leroy Vinnegar	Andy Simpkins
Jerry Gonzalez	Henry Vestine	Wells Kelly
Ron Altbach	Soupe Bradshaw	Jitter Webb
Joe Angelo	Jeff Foskett	Dave Pegg
Probyn Gregory	Charlie Musselwhite	Les Johnson
Matt Jardine	Carli Muñoz	Robert Kenyatta
Randell Kirsch	Jim Armstrong	Jeff Kaplan
Don Zirilli	Paul Harris	American Spring
Zoey Zook	Steve Kalinich	Christian Love
Mt. Rushmore	Darrol Schexnayder	Elliot Ingber

Scott Totten

== Discography ==
A brief list of bands and musicians Kowalski has played with:

- Pat and Lolly Vegas at the Haunted House (1965) - Pat and Lolly Vegas
- Louisiana Fog (1968) - Charlie Musselwhite
- 20/20 (1969) - The Beach Boys
- Live in London (1969) - The Beach Boys
- The Road to Ruin (1970) - John & Beverley Martyn
- Ragtime Cowboy Jew (1970) - Stefan Grossman
- Bryter Layter (1970) - Nick Drake
- Freedom Flight (1971) - Shuggie Otis
- Smiling Men with Bad Reputations (1971) - Mike Heron
- Surf's Up (1971) - The Beach Boys
- The Beach Boys in Concert (1973) - The Beach Boys
- M.I.U. Album (1978) - The Beach Boys
- Crazy Moon (1978) - Crazy Horse
- Survivor (1978) - Barry Mann
- Almost Summer Soundtrack (1978) - Celebration
- Weavings (1978) - Charles Lloyd
- Get On Your Back (1984) - The Backsters
- Still Cruisin' (1989) - The Beach Boys
- Live & Jumpin' (1997) - The Backsters
- Symphonic Sounds: Music of the Beach Boys (1998) - Royal Philharmonic Orchestra
- Garden State (2004) - Movie, Various Artists
- A Postcard From California (2011) - Al Jardine
- Made in California (2013) - The Beach Boys
