= Northern Sky =

Song by Nick Drake

Song by Nick Drake

from the album Bryter Layter
- Released: 1971
- Recorded: 1970
- Genre: Folk
- Length: 3:45
- Label: Island
- Songwriter: Nick Drake
- Producer: Joe Boyd

Official audio
- "Northern Sky" on YouTube

"Northern Sky" is a song from the English singer-songwriter Nick Drake's 1971 album Bryter Layter, produced by Joe Boyd. During the recording sessions for the album, the chronically shy and withdrawn songwriter formed a friendship and a mentorship of sorts with producer Joe Boyd, an early supporter of Drake. Boyd saw commercial potential in the acoustic and unaccompanied demo version of the song, and recruited former Velvet Underground member John Cale as producer. Cale added piano, organ and celesta arrangements, initially against Drake's wishes.

The song marked a strong redirection in Drake's sound. He was pleased with Cale's production and anticipated that the song would be his commercially successful breakthrough. However, Island Records decided against releasing it as a single, and the accompanying album, like its predecessor, did not receive marketing support, and so failed to sell. Having tried lush arrangements, Drake's following album Pink Moon is characterised by bleak vocals and sparse guitar parts, but again only received limited release.

In the 1980s "Northern Sky" became pivotal in resurrecting interest in Drake's music that until then had been largely forgotten. Biographer Patrick Humphries describes the song as "the finest ... to which Nick Drake ever lent his name. Again sounding alone and vulnerable ... he pleads for the brightness to come."

== Composition and arrangement ==
“Northern Sky” is written in Drake's favoured CGCFCE tuning with a capo on the third fret. The middle eight was composed by Cale during the recording. The accompaniment by the classically trained Cale reflects Drake's desire to move away from the pastoral sound of his 1969 debut album Five Leaves Left, which was a commercial failure. Cale's own career was similarly in tatters; he had been fired from the Velvet Underground by Lou Reed two years earlier, and was yet to re-establish his reputation as a formidable producer. Drake sought to broaden his own appeal and tentatively agreed to Boyd's suggestion to include bass and drum tracks on recordings for Bryter Layter, and to experiment with a more pop or jazzy sound, which Boyd admitted he imagined would be "more commercial". Yet it essentially retains Drake's original acoustic style, being anchored by long term producers and arrangers Robert Kirby and John Wood's sharp and stripped-down sparse engineering and production values. Trevor Dann believes that the contrasting approach of the two men produced accompaniment that is "opulent without overpowering the fragile little song".

The song was probably written during Drake's brief period of living in Hastings with John Martyn and his wife Beverley. According to Beverley Martyn, "He wrote that one around us. We had a tree in the garden across the pavement – hence the line, 'Smelt sweet breezes at the top of a tree.' The top of the tree came to the window where Nick was, and you could see the full moon on the sea at night." There has been speculation as for whom the song was written, with Linda Thompson as the most often mentioned candidate. There is no real evidence for this however, and he was at the time friendly with a number of women. He had platonic friendships with both Sophia Ryde and Beverley Martyn, with whom he was particularly close, although neither of these relationships developed. Dann speculates if the song was inspired by Drake's enthusiasm for hashish, a drug which the songwriter was using, according to close associates, to insulate himself from the world around him. Although he does not appear to have developed his drug habit further, it has been suggested that his tastes developed after his contact with Cale, who was struggling with a heroin habit. After Bryter Layter failed to sell, Drake rarely left his flat, and then only to play an occasional poorly-attended concert or to buy drugs.

"Northern Sky"
"Northern Sky" features piano, organ and celesta performed by John Cale.

Boyd was at the time working as co-producer with John Cale on Nico's Desertshore album. Boyd sent the recently ex-Velvet Underground member a demo recording of a few of the tracks that were to form Bryter Layter. The morning Cale received them, he rang Boyd asking "Who the fuck *is* this guy? I have to meet him, where is he right now." He described his first impressions after meeting Drake as of "a very quiet guy. It was very difficult to figure what was going on in his mind. He made music with a real sensuality – very different from English folk music". Boyd phoned Drake, and was given consent – Boyd claims Drake's only words during the conversation were "Oh, uh, OK". He arranged a recording session for the following day, on the condition that Cale would be allowed to add accompaniment to the tracks. That morning, with Wood and Kirby engineering and assisting, they recorded "Northern Sky" and "Fly". Cale improvised piano, celeste, and Hammond organ parts on "Northern Sky", and viola and harpsichord arrangements on "Fly". In his 2006 biography of Drake, Trevor Dann describes Cale's contribution as infusing the tracks with a "subtlety that Robert Kirby's full-blown arrangements didn't quite match on some of the other tracks [on Bryter Layter].

Boyd noticed that Cale was strongly leading the direction of the recording but that Drake gradually seemed to gain trust in Cale's judgment. During the session, he asked the songwriter if he was happy with the direction the songs were taking and was met with an affirmative "Yeh, yeh, I guess so yeh, yeh." Boyd later wrote that "despite [Cale's] domineering manner, [he] was very solicitous towards Nick, who seemed to be guardedly enjoying himself: his only choice was to relax and be carried along." Although Boyd is credited with production, he admits his actual contribution was putting the two men in contact.

== Reception ==
Although Drake's debut album was commercially unsuccessful, Boyd was able to generate a mood of optimism around the lead-up to the release of Bryter Layter. According to Kirby, Drake was uncharacteristically upbeat. He felt Bryter Layter "was going to be the one with a single on it. I always rated "Poor Boy", but they could have gone with "Northern Sky", but nothing ever happened." Patrick Humphries wrote of the song: "The atmosphere is dense, suggesting silver moons sailing on a raven black sea, wind lightly ruffling the hair of the treetops, all stoked by a crazy kind of magic; and the alchemy is fuelled by Cale's hymnal organ and soaring piano figures." Music critic Peter Paphides described it as, "the most unabashedly joyful song in his canon."

== Legacy ==
The 1985 UK hit single "Life in a Northern Town" by The Dream Academy was based on and inspired by "Northern Sky", and contributed to the early to mid-80s revival of interest in the songwriter's career. Singer Nick Laird-Clowes's vocals directly echo Drake's style, while the record sleeve contains the words "Nick Drake, Steve Reich & Classics for Pleasure". Drake, then not well known in the UK, was name-checked in a Melody Maker interview with Laird-Clowes, who said his song came from a "strong connection with Nick Drake in a way I can't even explain". As a result of this, the BBC began to field requests for Drake's song, while Nick Stewart, head of A&R at Island Records, pitched to the label that the songwriter's catalogue might be ideally placed for re-issue to the then developing adult CD market. The song was issued as a promotional CD maxi-single for the 1994 compilation album Way to Blue: An Introduction to Nick Drake. In 2004 the NME described the song as the "greatest English love song of modern times".

In April 2024, the song was the subject of BBC Radio 4's programme Soul Music.

== Personnel ==
- Nick Drake – vocals and acoustic guitar
- John Cale – celeste, piano and Hammond organ
- Dave Pegg – bass
- Mike Kowalski – drums

== Certifications ==
Region	Certification	Certified units/sales
United Kingdom (BPI)	Silver	200,000^{‡}
^{‡} Sales+streaming figures based on certification alone.

== Sources ==
- Dann, Trevor (2006). Darker Than the Deepest Sea: The Search for Nick Drake, Da Capo Press. London. ISBN 978-0-306-81520-1
- Boyd, Joe (2006). White Bicycles – Making Music in the 1960s, Serpent's Tail. ISBN 978-1-85242-910-2
- Humphries, Patrick (1997). Nick Drake: The Biography, Bloomsbury USA. ISBN 978-1-58234-035-7
