= Pink Moon =

Studio album by Nick Drake
- Released: 25 February 1972
- Recorded: 30–31 October 1971
- Studios: Sound Techniques, London
- Genres: Folk; indie folk; chamber folk
- Length: 28:22
- Label: Island
- Producer: John Wood

Nick Drake chronology
Bryter Layter (1971)	Pink Moon (1972)	Fruit Tree (1979)

Pink Moon is the third and final studio album by the English musician Nick Drake, released in the UK by Island Records on 25 February 1972. It was the only one of Drake's studio albums to be released in North America during his lifetime. Pink Moon differs from Drake's previous albums in that it was recorded without a backing band, featuring just Drake on vocals and acoustic guitar, the only other instrumentation being a single piano melody overdubbed onto the title track.

Pink Moon, like Drake's previous studio albums, did not sell well during his lifetime, and its stripped-back, intimate sound received a mixed response from critics. However, the album has since garnered significant critical acclaim, retrospectively being named one of the greatest albums of the 1970s.

== Background ==
Nick Drake's first two albums with Island Records, Five Leaves Left (1969) and Bryter Layter (1971), had sold poorly, and combined with Drake's reluctance to perform live or engage in album promotion, Island was not confident of another album from Drake. Additionally, Drake had isolated himself in his London apartment and was suffering from depression. In 1971, he saw a psychiatrist and was prescribed antidepressants, which he was reluctant to take due to the stigma associated with depression and his fears concerning the medication's interaction with marijuana, which he smoked regularly.

Although critics often associate Drake's music with his depression – especially the perceived melancholy of Pink Moon – Cally Callomon of Bryter Music, which manages Drake's estate, remembers it differently: "Nick was incapable of writing and recording while he was suffering from periods of depression. He was not depressed during the writing or recording of Pink Moon and was immensely proud of the album."

== Recording ==
"Pink Moon Recording"
BBC Radio 2 documentary from 2004 with John Wood about the two nights of recording Pink Moon.

Drake appeared to have made a decision before recording his third album that it would be as plain as possible and free of the numerous guest musicians that had been employed on Bryter Layter. In his autobiography, Joe Boyd, producer of Drake's first two albums, remembered that as they were finishing the recording of Bryter Layter, Drake had told him that he wanted to make his next record alone. In his only interview, published in Sounds magazine in March 1971, Drake told interviewer Jerry Gilbert that "for the next [album] I had the idea of just doing something with John Wood, the engineer at Sound Techniques".

After a brief hiatus in Spain spent at a villa belonging to Island Records' head Chris Blackwell, Drake returned to London refreshed. In October 1971, he approached record engineer and producer John Wood, who had worked with Drake on his previous two albums and who Drake felt was one of the few people he could trust. Wood had worked with other artists such as Fairport Convention, Cat Stevens, and Pink Floyd, and had engineered Drake's first two albums. Although Wood primarily focused on the engineering of an album, he often contributed as a producer.

When Drake reached out to Wood in 1971 expressing his interest in recording another album, the ensuing process was significantly pared down compared to Drake's other two albums. The album was recorded at Sound Techniques studio in London on 30–31 October 1971 with just Drake and Wood present. With the studio being booked during the day, Drake and Wood arrived at the studio around 11:00 p.m. and simply and quietly recorded half the songs. The next night, they did the same.

Contrary to popular legend that Drake dropped the album off in a plastic bag at Island Records reception and then left without anyone realising it, Drake delivered the master tapes of Pink Moon to Chris Blackwell at Island. In an interview for the Nick Drake fanzine Pynk Moon in 1996, Island's press officer David Sandison recalled that Drake's arrival at the record company had certainly not gone unnoticed, although there had been no indication that he was delivering them a new album:

I saw him in reception after I came back from lunch and I was talking to somebody and I saw a figure in the corner on the bench, and I suddenly realised it was Nick. He had this big, 15 ips [inches per second] master tape box under his arm, and I said 'Have you had a cup of tea?' and he said 'Erm, yes', and I said 'Do you want to come upstairs?' and he said 'Yes, okay'. So we went upstairs into my office, which was on top of the landing, it was a landing that went into the big office with a huge round table where Chris and everybody else worked—very democratic—and there was a big Reevox [sic] and sound system there, and he just sat in my office area for about half an hour ... After about half an hour he said 'I'd better be going', and I said 'Okay, nice to see you', and he left. Now, he went down the stairs and he still had the tapes under his arm, and about an hour later the girl who worked behind the front desk called up and said 'Nick's left his tapes behind'. So I went down and it was the big sixteen-track master tape and it said NICK DRAKE PINK MOON, and I thought 'that's not an album I know'. The first thing to do was get it in the studio to make a seven and a half inch safety copy, because that was the master. So we ran off a safety copy to actually play, and I think twenty four hours later or so, it was put on the Reevox in the main room and we heard Pink Moon.

The tapes of the Pink Moon session also included Drake's recording of "Plaisir d'amour" ("The Pleasure of Love"), a classical French love song written in 1784 by Jean-Paul-Égide Martini. "Plaisir d'amour" was on the track listing of the Pink Moon master tape box as the first track of Side Two when the tapes were presented. However, a note in reference to the song was included which read, "Spare title – Do not use", so the song did not make it onto the album. The recording, less than a minute long and featuring guitar with no vocals, was eventually included as a hidden track on UK editions of the Nick Drake compilation A Treasury (2004). Had "Plaisir d'amour" been included on the Pink Moon album, it would have been the only song on any of his albums that Drake did not write himself.

== Music and lyrics ==
Characterized as a fusing of "beauty and melancholy," the tracks on Pink Moon explore themes such as lust, depression and "the slimmest rays of hope," according to Josh Jackson of Paste. Released two years before Drake's death in November 1974, at the age of twenty-six, the lyrical content of Pink Moon has often been attributed to Drake's ongoing battle with depression.

The songs are shorter than on his previous albums, with a total album running time of just over twenty-eight minutes.

== Artwork ==
Keith Morris was the photographer who took Drake's photo for the cover of Five Leaves Left and he was commissioned to photograph Drake for the cover of Pink Moon. However, the photos were not used as Drake's rapidly deteriorating appearance, hunched figure and blank expression were not considered good selling points. Island's creative director Annie Sullivan, who oversaw the shoot, recalled the difficulty in making a decision around the cover of the LP: "I remember going to talk to [Nick], and he just sat there, hunched up, and even though he didn't speak, I knew the album was called Pink Moon, and I can't remember how he conveyed it, whether he wrote it down ... he wanted a pink moon. He couldn't tell me what he wanted, but I had 'pink moon' to go on." Island picked a piece of surrealist Dalí-esque art by Michael Trevithick, who was incidentally a friend of Drake's sister Gabrielle. Although Drake was not outspoken in his opinion on the cover art of Pink Moon, many close to him felt that he approved.

David Sandison stated that he found the original framed artwork for Pink Moon in among the debris of the basement room that Island later allocated to him as his office, and he took it home and hung it on the wall of his house for several years, before eventually presenting it to Drake's parents. An undated photo of Drake's music room at his parents' house in Tanworth-in-Arden shows what appears to be the artwork hanging on the wall.

== Critical reception ==
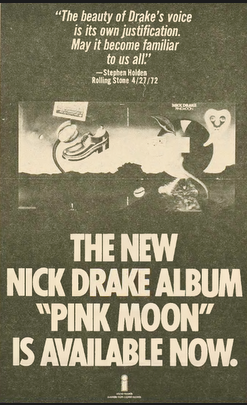
Full page advertisement of the release of Pink Moon.

Island Records launched an unusual promotional campaign for the initial release of Pink Moon. They spent the entire promotional budget on full-page advertisements in all major music magazines the month of the record's release.

Pink Moon received more attention from the UK music press than Drake's first two albums had, but most critical reviews were still brief.

In 1971, Jerry Gilbert of Sounds had conducted the only known interview with Drake. Gilbert had championed Drake up to this point, but expressed his disappointment with Pink Moon and his frustration at Drake's apparent lack of motivation, saying, "The album consists entirely of Nick's guitar, voice and piano and features all the usual characteristics without ever matching up to Bryter Layter. One has to accept that Nick's songs necessarily require further augmentation, for whilst his own accompaniments are good the songs are not sufficiently strong to stand up without any embroidery at all. 'Things Behind the Sun' makes it, so does 'Parasite' – but maybe it's time Mr. Drake stopped acting so mysteriously and started getting something properly organised for himself."

In Melody Maker, Mark Plummer appreciated the music, but was distracted by Drake's growing ascetic mythology: "His music is so personal and shyly presented both lyrically and in his confined guitar and piano playing that neither does nor doesn't come over ... The more you listen to Drake though, the more compelling his music becomes – but all the time it hides from you. On 'Things Behind the Sun', he sings to me, embarrassed and shy. Perhaps one should play his albums with the sound off and just look at the cover and make the music in your head reciting his words from inside the cover to your own rhythmic heart rhymes ... It could be that Nick Drake does not exist at all."

Referring to Drake's recorded output, Fred Dellar noted in Hi-Fi News & Record Review that "the LPs hardly sell, thanks partly to Nick's reluctance to play promotional concerts and one is left with the feeling that his only ambition is to play the lead in the Howard Hughes story should anyone ever decide to make it as a musical. In the meantime, he employs his deliciously smokey voice in making these intimate, late-night sounds that I find myself playing time and time again." Duncan Fallowell of Records and Recording said that "his songs are infinitely soothing and infinitely similar", calling the album "even more unassuming than the others", and stating "Nick Drake will never strike it big. It is not in his nature or in the nature of his music. And that is another good thing too." In the London edition of Time Out, Al Clark observed that Drake "writes striking and evocative songs and always has done, but most of the magic is in the delivery: a smoky, palpitating voice, reminiscent of the jazzier Donovan, gliding wistful words over the chord changes and creating moments of perfect stillness". Clark stated that "several of the more substantial songs are very lovely", but concluded presciently, "Sadly, and despite Island's efforts to rectify the situation, Nick Drake is likely to remain in the shadows, the private troubadour of those who have been fortunate enough to catch an earful of his exquisite 3am introversions".

Reviewing the album in the October 1972 issue of Creem, Colman Andrews described the songs as "not awfully good" and "weak", and that the music was "a triumph of style over sententiousness, of sound over sense" with "a lulling repetitiousness to a lot of what he sings", but that this was the point: "he knows precisely what emotional limits to impose upon his self-accompaniment. It's seductive music."

Professional ratings
Legacy reviews
Review scores
Source	Rating
AllMusic	5/5 stars
Encyclopedia of Popular Music	4/5 stars
Hi-Fi News & Record Review	A
MusicHound Folk	4.5/5
Pitchfork	10/10
Q	5/5 stars
Rolling Stone	5/5 stars
The Rolling Stone Album Guide	4/5 stars
Spin Alternative Record Guide	10/10
Uncut	5/5 stars

By the time of the album's reissues on compact disc in the 1990s and 2000s, Drake's fame and critical standing had improved considerably, and legacy reviews of the album were overwhelmingly favourable.

Martin Aston of Q noted in 1990 that "the mood is even more remote [than Drake's first two albums] with – finally – a defeated strain in both throat and words, but several of his most elegant melodies".

John Harris's review of the 2000 reissue in the same magazine was more positive still, claiming that "many hold up Pink Moon as Nick Drake's best album" and saying, "The motivation of success had evaporated and Drake made a record so singular and uncompromising that, superficially, it beggars belief ... The truth is that Pink Moon's excellence shines through, irrespective of the endless speculation [regarding Drake's state of mind during the making of the record and subsequent death]. Few records have ever sounded so intimate, or embodied the eternal human ailment known as Melancholy with such grace and assurance."

In Mojo, Rob Chapman claimed that "Pink Moon is his masterpiece and the Robert Johnson comparisons are fully deserved".

Critic and author Ian MacDonald, a contemporary of Drake's at Cambridge University, stated in Uncut that "what remains clear is that this is one of the premium singer-songwriter albums, nearly every one of its 11 tracks a timeless classic".

Rolling Stone's Anthony DeCurtis observed that "by the time of these sessions, Drake had retreated so deeply into his own internal world that it is difficult to say what the songs are 'about'. His lyrics are so compressed as to be kind of folkloric haikus, almost childishly simple in their structure and elemental in their imagery. His voice conveys, in its moans and breathy whispers, an alluring sensuality, but he sings as if he were viewing his life from a great, unbridgeable distance. That element of detachment is chilling. To reinforce it, messages of isolation gradually float to the surface of the songs' spare, eloquent melodies."

Three years later in the same magazine, James Hunter said of the 2003 North American reissue "The album unleashes a dramatic starkness and some breathtakingly pretty music".

AllMusic's Ned Raggett wrote in his retrospective review that "Pink Moon more than anything else is the record that made Drake the cult figure he remains. Specifically, Pink Moon is the bleakest of [all his records]; that the likes of Belle and Sebastian are fans of Drake may be clear enough, but it's doubtful they could ever achieve the calm, focused anguish of this album, as harrowing as it is attractive ... Drake's elegant melancholia avoiding sounding pretentious in the least thanks to his continued embrace of simple, tender vocalizing. Meanwhile, the sheer majesty of his guitar playing – consider the opening notes of 'Road' or 'Parasite' – makes for a breathless wonder to behold."

Reviewing Pink Moon as part of the 2014 box set Tuck Box, Jayson Greene of Pitchfork noted, "A 'pink moon' is a baleful symbol, a sign of impending death or calamity ... On paper, this sentiment reads like vindictive rage, but on record, it sounds contemplative. Drake's voice never conveyed palpable anger or sadness; he had a slight, gentle voice and upper-class accent, the product of his upbringing, clipped and clean, and his guitar, as always, rang out with a crystalline purity. His music is so consoling that the darkness at its heart is not always accessible. It's almost impossible to hear the emotional abandon in Pink Moon, then, without the taste of his first two albums lingering on your mouth. It's only then that the bone-dry resonance of the guitars registers as slightly alarming, and the backdrop of silence suggests both the purity of Drake's vision and also something darker: like someone who has dropped out of the world, mumbling prophecies ... There is a stillness to Nick Drake's music that bewitches anyone who gets near enough, and Pink Moon is its purest expression. It remains the Nick Drake record most people begin with, and for good reason."

In 2025, the magazine Paste referred to the album as Drake's "final masterpiece."

=== Accolades ===
Pink Moon was voted number 131 in the third edition of Colin Larkin's All Time Top 1000 Albums (2000). In 2003, the album was ranked number 320 on Rolling Stone magazine's list of the 500 Greatest Albums of All Time. In 2012, that ranking was revised to number 321, and in 2020 was revised to number 201.

In the UK, Pink Moon was placed at number 48 in Melody Maker's 2000 list of the best albums of all time, and at number 126 in Uncut's 200 Greatest Albums of All Time in 2016.

== Legacy ==
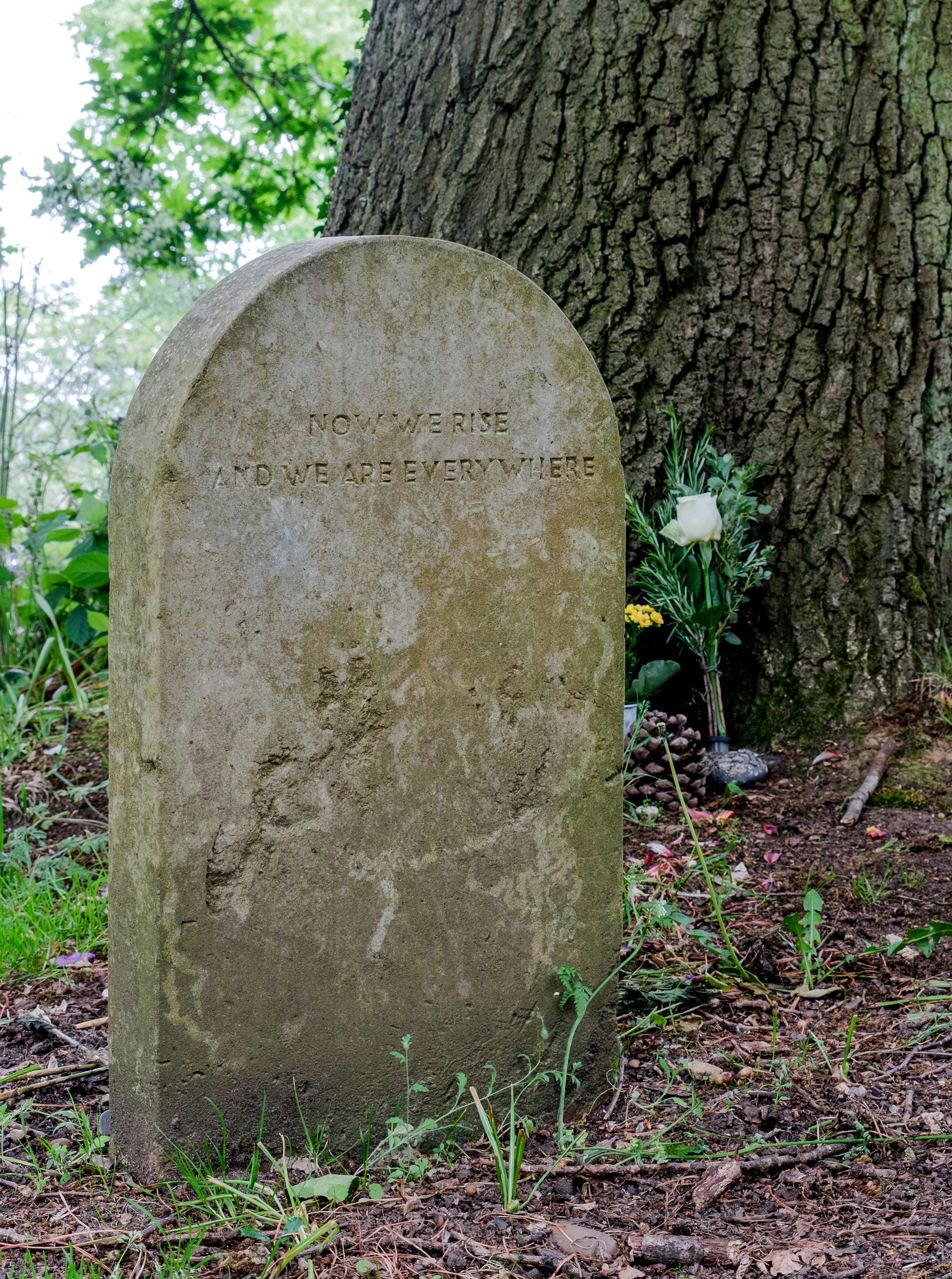
Drake's tombstone contains a line from the last track on Pink Moon, "From the Morning."

Cited as the only cover version released during his lifetime, Irish band Tír na nÓg included a recording of "Free Ride" on their 1973 album Strong in the Sun. In 1992 Lucinda Williams covered "Which Will" on her album Sweet Old World while alt-rock trio Walt Mink covered "Pink Moon" and alternative rock band Sebadoh covered "Pink Moon" on their EP Sebadoh vs Helmet. By 2006, Beck recorded covers of the album's songs for online-only release, including "Which Will" and "Parasite."

=== 1999 Volkswagen Cabriolet advertisement ===
On 11 November 1999, Volkswagen debuted a television advertising campaign named "Milky Way" that featured the Volkswagen Cabriolet with the title track of Pink Moon as the soundtrack.

Ron Lawner, Chief Creative Officer of Arnold Communications stated in the press release, "The song is very special. It's an old song by a guy named Nick Drake. It's called 'Pink Moon' and is actually a very good introduction to Nick Drake if you're not familiar with him. It's very transporting. And to us seemed very fitting for a beautiful drive in the country on a very special night."

The Volkswagen Cabriolet commercial, directed by Jonathan Dayton and Valerie Faris and filmed by Lance Acord, led to a large increase in record sales and a number-five placing for Pink Moon in Amazon's sales chart.

Bethany Klein, the Professor of Media and Communication at the University of Central England states, "The role of 'Pink Moon' in the success of "Milky Way" was interesting, in that it both added to the artistry of the commercial and was also protected by the visual artistry of the spot: because the ad 'worked' (it was an aesthetic success) the usual negative discourse surrounding the use of popular music in advertising was, if not stopped, at least reduced and accompanied by positive appraisals ... The linking together of the ad being a 'watershed' and being 'nicely done' is no coincidence; it is because the ad is so well executed and so aesthetically successful that the industry and the public reassessed the use of music in advertising around this example." In 2001, Volkswagen gave all new Volkswagen Cabrio buyers a compilation CD which featured "Pink Moon" as the first track.

American sales of Nick Drake's Pink Moon album rose from 6,000 copies, prior to the song's use in the Cabrio advertisement, to 74,000 copies in 2000. As of 2004, it had sold 329,000 copies in the United States.

== Track listing ==
All songs written and composed by Nick Drake.

Side one
No.	Title	Notes	Length
1.	"Pink Moon"		2:06
2.	"Place to Be"		2:43
3.	"Road"		2:02
4.	"Which Will"		2:58
5.	"Horn"	Instrumental	1:23
6.	"Things Behind the Sun"		3:57

Side two
No.	Title	Length
1.	"Know"	2:26
2.	"Parasite"	3:36
3.	"Free Ride"	3:06
4.	"Harvest Breed"	1:37
5.	"From the Morning"	2:30
Total length:		28:22

== Personnel ==
All credits adapted from the album's liner notes.

- Nick Drake – vocals, acoustic guitar; piano on "Pink Moon"

Production

- John Wood – engineer, producer
- Michael Trevithick – artwork
- Keith Morris – inner sleeve photography
- C.C.S. Associates – typography

== Certifications ==
Region	Certification	Certified units/sales
Italy (FIMI)	Gold	25,000^{‡}
United Kingdom (BPI)	Gold	100,000^{^}
^{^} Shipments figures based on certification alone.^{‡} Sales+streaming figures based on certification alone.

== Release history ==
Release formats for Pink Moon
Region	Year	Label	Format	Catalog	Notes
United Kingdom	25 February 1972	Island	LP	ILPS 9184	Re-pressed 1976, 1978 and 1989 with different Island Records logos
United States	1972	Island	LP	SMAS 9318	
United Kingdom & Europe	April 1990	Island	CD	IMCD 94/842 923-2	Original CD release as part of the Island Masters series
United States	22 June 1992	Hannibal Records	CD	HNCD 4436	
United Kingdom & Europe	26 June 2000	Island	remastered CD	IMCD 94/842 923-2	CD reissue as part of the Island Masters series, now labelled "Island Re-Masters", with additional slip cover and original label reprint on the CD
United States	6 May 2003	Island	remastered CD	422 842 923-2	
Canada	6 May 2003	Island	remastered CD	4228429232	
United Kingdom & Europe	18 May 2009	Island	180 gram LP	1745697	re-pressed 18 November 2013
Worldwide	12 November 2012	Island	Remastered LP box set	0602537134335	
