= Bryter Layter =

Studio album by Nick Drake
- Released: 5 March 1971
- Studios: Sound Techniques, London
- Genres: Folk; folk-pop; chamber folk; folk rock
- Length: 39:09
- Label: Island
- Producer: Joe Boyd

Nick Drake chronology
Five Leaves Left (1969)	Bryter Layter (1971)	Pink Moon (1972)

Bryter Layter is the second studio album by the English folk singer-songwriter Nick Drake. Released on March 5, 1971 by Island Records, it was his last album to feature other musicians, as his next and final studio album, Pink Moon, had him perform unaccompanied.

== Content and production ==
Like Five Leaves Left, the album contains no unaccompanied songs; Nick Drake was accompanied by musicians including members of Fairport Convention and John Cale of the Velvet Underground, as well as Beach Boys session musicians Mike Kowalski and Ed Carter. According to arranger Robert Kirby, Drake had intended for the arrangements to evoke the Beach Boys' Pet Sounds. Initially scheduled for release in November 1970, with UK promotional copies being sent out at the time, dissatisfaction with the artwork meant that the album was held over until the following March.

== Reception ==
Professional ratings
Review scores
Source	Rating
AllMusic	5/5 stars
Encyclopedia of Popular Music	5/5 stars
Entertainment Weekly	B+
Pitchfork	9.7/10
Q	5/5 stars

Contemporary reviews were mostly positive. In Sounds, Jerry Gilbert called the album "superb" and said, "On their own merits, the songs of Nick Drake are not particularly strong, but Nick has always been a consistent if introverted performer, and placed in the cauldron that [producer] Joe Boyd has prepared for him, then things start to effervesce." Gilbert praised the "splendid arrangements" of Robert Kirby and said that the songs "take time to work through to the listener, with help from the beautiful backing which every track receives". Lon Goddard of Record Mirror was also impressed by Drake's guitar technique and Kirby's arrangements, and stated that "Nick isn't the world's top singer, but he's written fantastic numbers that suit strings marvellously. Definitely one of the prettiest (and that counts!) and most impressive albums I've heard ... Happy, sad, very moving." "The Disc Panel" in Disc and Music Echo stated that Drake "sings his own very personal songs in a strange, deep vaseline voice, probably more suited to crooning, accompanied at times by really funky backing" and called the record "an extraordinarily good hefty folk album". However, Andrew Means of Melody Maker described the album as "late-night coffee'n'chat music" where "the 10 tracks are all very similar – quiet, gentle and relaxing."

Retrospectively, Mojo called the album "certainly the most polished of his catalogue". Alternative Press called it "[one] of the most beautiful and melancholy albums ever recorded".

In his 2016 book Never a Dull Moment: 1971 – The Year That Rock Exploded, David Hepworth described "At the Chime of a City Clock" as "the perfect soundtrack for the dispensing of a cup of tea in a polystyrene cup, marrying sound and image in a way that made me unsure whether I was watching a commercial or actually in a commercial".

== Legacy ==
In 2000, Q placed Bryter Layter at number 23 in its list of the 100 Greatest British Albums Ever. It ranked at number 14 in NME's list of the Greatest Albums of the '70s.

It was voted number 306 in the third edition of Colin Larkin's All Time Top 1000 Albums (2000).

In 2003, the album was ranked number 245 on Rolling Stone magazine's list of the 500 Greatest Albums of All Time.

The guitar Drake holds on the album cover is owned by Nick Laird-Clowes of the Dream Academy, whose "Life in a Northern Town" was written as an elegy to Drake.

== In popular culture ==
- The cover of the North American version of the 2003 album Akuma no Uta by Japanese metal band Boris pays tribute to Bryter Layter.
- The song "Fly" was featured in Wes Anderson's 2001 film The Royal Tenenbaums and appeared on its soundtrack.
- The song "One of These Things First" was featured in the 2004 film Garden State and on the Grammy Award-winning soundtrack, compiled by Zach Braff. The song was also used in the 2008 film Seven Pounds. and the season 6 finale of Slow Horses.
- The song "Northern Sky" was featured in the 2001 film Serendipity, was frequently featured in the NBC series This Is Us, and was chosen as a track by Sue Perkins whilst on BBC Radio 4 programme Desert Island Discs.
- Bryter Layter features prominently in the 2020 novel Summer by the Scottish author Ali Smith, when the character Grace hears the album ("pretty flute, very 1970s") being played on a cassette machine in a church, leading to a conversation about Drake.

== Track listing ==
All tracks are written by Nick Drake.

Side one
No.	Title	Length
1.	"Introduction" (instrumental)	1:33
2.	"Hazey Jane II"	3:46
3.	"At the Chime of a City Clock"	4:47
4.	"One of These Things First"	4:52
5.	"Hazey Jane I"	4:31

Side two
No.	Title	Length
1.	"Bryter Layter" (instrumental)	3:24
2.	"Fly"	3:00
3.	"Poor Boy"	6:09
4.	"Northern Sky"	3:47
5.	"Sunday" (instrumental)	3:42

== Personnel ==
Album credits adapted from Bryter Layter liner notes.

- Nick Drake – vocals (2–5, 7–9); acoustic guitar; electric guitar (8)

Additional musicians

- Dave Pegg – bass (1–3, 5–10)
- Dave Mattacks – drums (1, 2, 5, 6, 10)
- Robert Kirby – string arrangement (1, 3, 5, 10); brass arrangement (2)
- Richard Thompson – electric guitar (2)
- Ray Warleigh – alto saxophone (3, 8); flute (10)
- Paul Harris – piano (4)
- Ed Carter – bass (4)
- Mike Kowalski – drums (3, 4, 8, 9)
- Lyn Dobson – flute (5, 6)
- John Cale – viola, harpsichord (7); celeste, piano, organ (9)
- Chris McGregor – piano (8)
- Pat Arnold – backing vocals (8)
- Doris Troy – backing vocals (8)

Production

- Joe Boyd – producer
- John Wood – engineer
- Nigel Waymouth – sleeve design and front cover photograph
- Keith Morris – back cover photograph

== Release history ==
Region	Date	Label	Format	Catalogue
United Kingdom	5 March 1971	Island	LP	ILPS 9134
United Kingdom	May 1987	Island	CD	CID 9134
United Kingdom	26 June 2000	Island	CD	IMCD 71
