= River Man =

2004 single by Nick Drake

Single by Nick Drake

from the album Five Leaves Left
- B-side: "Day is Done"
- Released: 13 September 2004
- Recorded: 1969
- Genre: Folk baroque; baroque pop
- Length: 4:21
- Label: Island (UK), Elektra (US)
- Songwriter: Nick Drake
- Producers: Robert Kirby and Joe Boyd

Nick Drake singles chronology
"'Magic'" (2004)	"River Man" (2004)

Music audio
- "River Man" on YouTube from Peel Sessions

"River Man" is the second listed song from Nick Drake's 1969 album Five Leaves Left. According to Drake's manager, Joe Boyd, Drake thought of the song as the centrepiece of the album. In 2004, the song was remastered and released as a 7" vinyl and as enhanced CD single, including a music video by Tim Pope.

On 5 August 1969 Drake recorded the song for BBC's Peel Sessions.

== Musical structure and lyrics ==
The song is in a 5/4 time signature and is one of the few songs Drake wrote to be played in standard tuning. Boyd speculated that the composition was influenced by the Brazilian guitarist João Gilberto, and the critic Ian MacDonald suggested the rhythm was developed based on Dave Brubeck's "Take Five". Although most of the arrangements on Five Leaves Left were by Drake's friend Robert Kirby, this arrangement was by Harry Robertson (aka Harry Robinson), after Kirby said he "hadn't gotten to 5/4 in music school yet." Drake asked Robertson to make the strings sound like Frederick Delius.

Drake did not reveal the identity of the 'Betty' character in the lyrics, although Trevor Dann speculated that she may have been drawn from Betty Foy, a character in Wordsworth's "The Idiot Boy", a poem Drake had studied while attending Cambridge. However, the only similarity to the poem is the existence of a Betty.

== Track listing ==
2004 CD

1. "River Man"
2. "Day Is Done" (by Norah Jones and the Charlie Hunter Band)
3. "River Man" (video by Tim Pope)

2004 7"

1. "River Man"
2. "River Man" (demo version)

== Personnel ==
- Nick Drake – vocals, acoustic guitar
- Danny Thompson – double bass
- Harry Robinson – string arrangement
