= John Wood (music producer) =

English sound engineer and producer

John Wood is a Grammy-nominated English sound engineer and producer, best known for his work with Fairport Convention, John Martyn, Cat Stevens, Sandy Denny, Nick Drake, the Incredible String Band, Pink Floyd, Nico, John Cale and Squeeze.

== Career ==
After first working for Decca recording studios Wood honed his skills at London-based Levy Sound and Oriole studios before he and Geoff Frost opened Sound Techniques during the winter of 1964. The studios were housed within a converted dairy in Old Church Street, Chelsea, and soon went on to become one of the country's first independent professional music recording studios. In 1966, he met Joe Boyd, who worked with him closely. The two formed a partnership, whereby Wood tended to the record's sound, while Boyd looked after its musical direction. However, Wood, well known for his forthright approach, often gave his opinion on musical direction. According to Boyd: "professional session musicians regarded the pair of us with curiosity: the normal deference of engineer towards producer didn't seem to apply. He would give a withering sneer...I would tell him just do it and not give me any shit. If my resolve melted in the face of his contempt, it probably wasn't such a good idea in the first place."

Wood engineered all three of Nick Drake's albums, and was one of the few people the notoriously withdrawn singer trusted. According to Drake's biographer Trevor Dann, "He and Nick hit it off immediately, Woody the perfectionist soundman, Nick the perfectionist musician."

He lives in Aberdeen, Scotland, and remains in the business as an engineer and producer recently producing August Gilde’s debut album ‘A Different Kind’ and The Woolverstones debut album Grey Eyed Dandy. He has also recently mixed the current Reg Meuross album 'Fire and Dust', produced by Pete Townshend, a story/song cycle about the life and times of Woody Guthrie. He was nominated for a Grammy in 2026 for Best Historical Album.

== Sources ==
- Boyd, Joe (2006). White Bicycles – Making Music in the 1960s, Serpent's Tail. ISBN 1-85242-910-0
- Dann, Trevor (2006). Darker Than the Deepest Sea: The Search for Nick Drake, Da Capo Press. London. 2006. ISBN 0-306-81520-6
