= Nick Drake =

British musician (1948–1974)

- Drake in 1967

Background information
- Born: Nicholas Rodney Drake; 19 June 1948; Rangoon, Burma
- Died: 25 November 1974 (aged 26) Tanworth-in-Arden, Warwickshire, England
- Genres: Folk; chamber folk; folk-pop; folk-rock
- Occupations: Musician; singer; songwriter
- Instruments: Guitar; piano; vocals
- Years active: 1967–1974
- Label: Island
- Website: brytermusic.com

Nicholas Rodney Drake (19 June 1948 – 25 November 1974) was an English musician. An accomplished acoustic guitarist, Drake signed to Island Records at the age of twenty while still a student at the University of Cambridge. His debut album, Five Leaves Left, was released in 1969, and was followed by two more albums, Bryter Layter (1971) and Pink Moon (1972). He did not reach a wide audience during his lifetime, but found acclaim and wider recognition following his death.

Drake suffered from depression and was reluctant to perform in front of live audiences. Upon completion of Pink Moon, he withdrew from both performance and recording, retreating to his parents' home in rural Warwickshire. On 25 November 1974, at the age of 26, he died from an overdose of antidepressants.

Drake's music remained available through the mid-1970s, but the 1979 release of the retrospective collection Fruit Tree allowed his back catalogue to be reassessed. He has influenced numerous artists. The first Drake biography in English appeared in 1997; it was followed by the documentary films A Stranger Among Us in 1999 and A Skin Too Few: The Days of Nick Drake in 2000.

== Early life ==
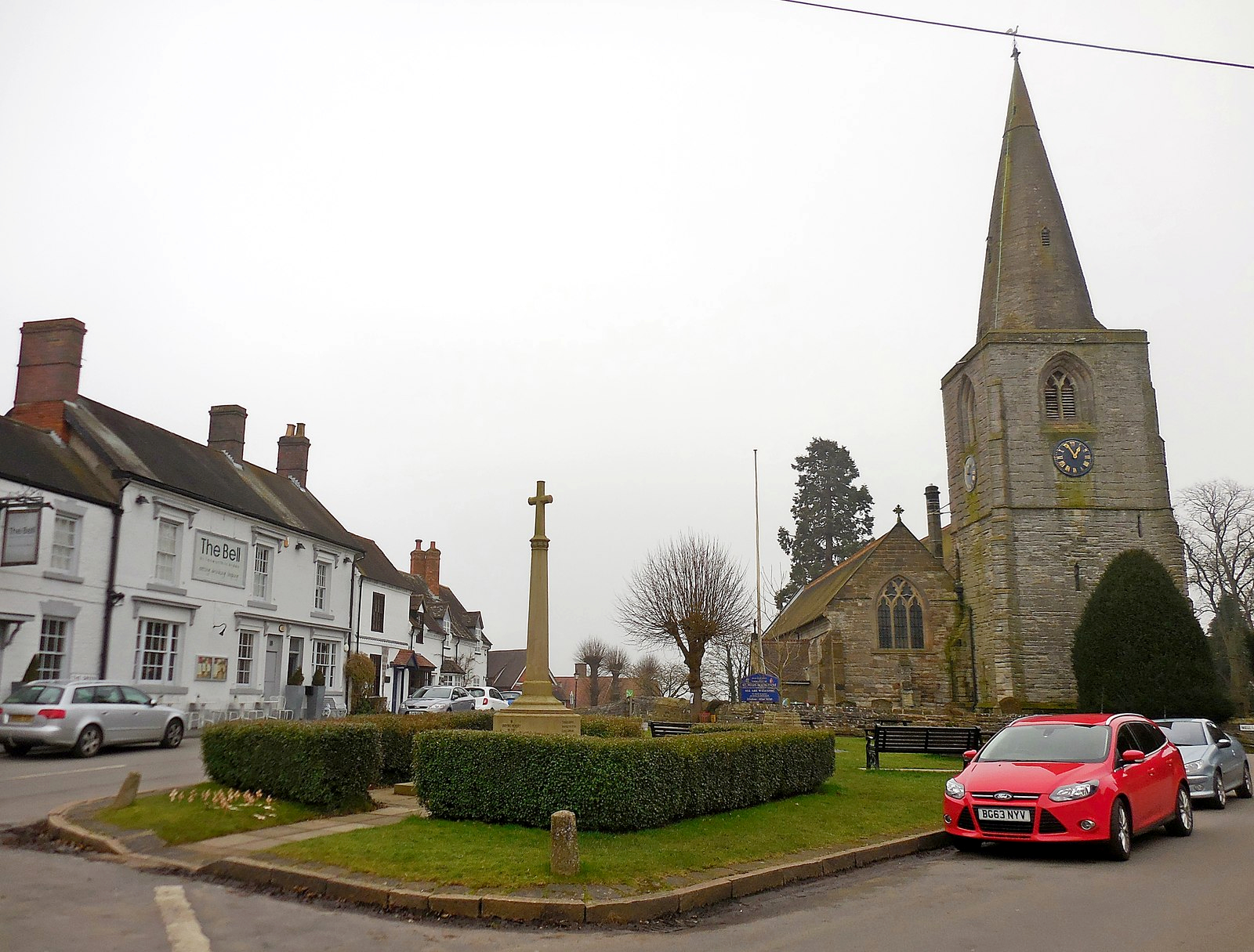
Tanworth-in-Arden, Warwickshire, where Drake was raised

Drake was born in Rangoon, Burma, on 19 June 1948, a few months after the independence from the British Empire. Drake's father, Rodney Shuttleworth Drake, had moved to Rangoon in the early 1930s as an engineer with the Bombay Burmah Trading Corporation. In 1934, Rodney Drake met Molly Lloyd, the daughter of a senior member of the Indian Civil Service. He proposed marriage in 1936, but the couple had to wait a year until she turned 21 before her family allowed them to marry. In 1951, the Drake family returned to England to live in Warwickshire, at their home, Far Leys, in Tanworth-in-Arden. Rodney Drake worked from 1952 as the chairman and managing director of Wolseley Engineering.

Drake's older sister, Gabrielle Drake, became a successful screen actress. Both of Drake's parents wrote music. Recordings of Molly's songs, which have come to light since her death, are similar in tone and outlook to the later work of her son; they shared a similar fragile vocal delivery, and Gabrielle and biographer Trevor Dann noted a parallel foreboding and fatalism in their music. Encouraged by his mother, Drake learned to play piano at an early age and began to compose songs which he recorded on a reel-to-reel tape recorder that she kept in the family drawing-room. In 1957, Drake was sent to Eagle House School, a preparatory boarding school near Sandhurst, Berkshire. Five years later, he went to Marlborough College, which had also been attended by his father and grandfather. He developed an interest in sport, becoming an accomplished 100- and 200-yard sprinter, representing the school's Open Team in 1966. He played rugby for the C1 House team and was appointed a House Captain in his last two terms. School friends recall Drake as having been confident, often aloof, and "quietly authoritative". His father remembered: "In one of his reports [the headmaster] said that none of us seemed to know him very well. All the way through with Nick, people didn't know him very much."

Drake played piano and learned clarinet and saxophone. He formed a band, the Perfumed Gardeners, with four schoolmates in 1964 or 1965. With Drake on piano and occasional alto sax and vocals, the group performed Pye International R&B covers and jazz standards, as well as Yardbirds and Manfred Mann songs. Chris de Burgh asked to join the band, but was rejected as his taste was "too poppy". His attention to his studies deteriorated and, although he had accelerated a year in Eagle House, at Marlborough he neglected his studies in favour of music. In 1963 he attained seven GCE O-Levels, fewer than his teachers had been expecting, failing "Physics with Chemistry". In 1965, Drake paid £13 (equivalent to £220 in 2025) for his first acoustic guitar, a Levin, and was soon experimenting with open tuning and finger-picking techniques.

In 1966, Drake enrolled at a tutorial college in Five Ways, Birmingham, where he won a scholarship to study at Fitzwilliam College, Cambridge. As his place at Cambridge was offered for September 1967, he had ten months to fill, so he decided to spend six months at the University of Aix-Marseille, France, beginning in February 1967. There, he began to practise guitar in earnest. To earn money, he would busk with friends in the town centre. Drake began to smoke cannabis, and he travelled with friends to Morocco; according to travelling companion Richard Charkin, "that was where you got the best pot". There is some evidence that he began using LSD while in Aix, although this is debated.

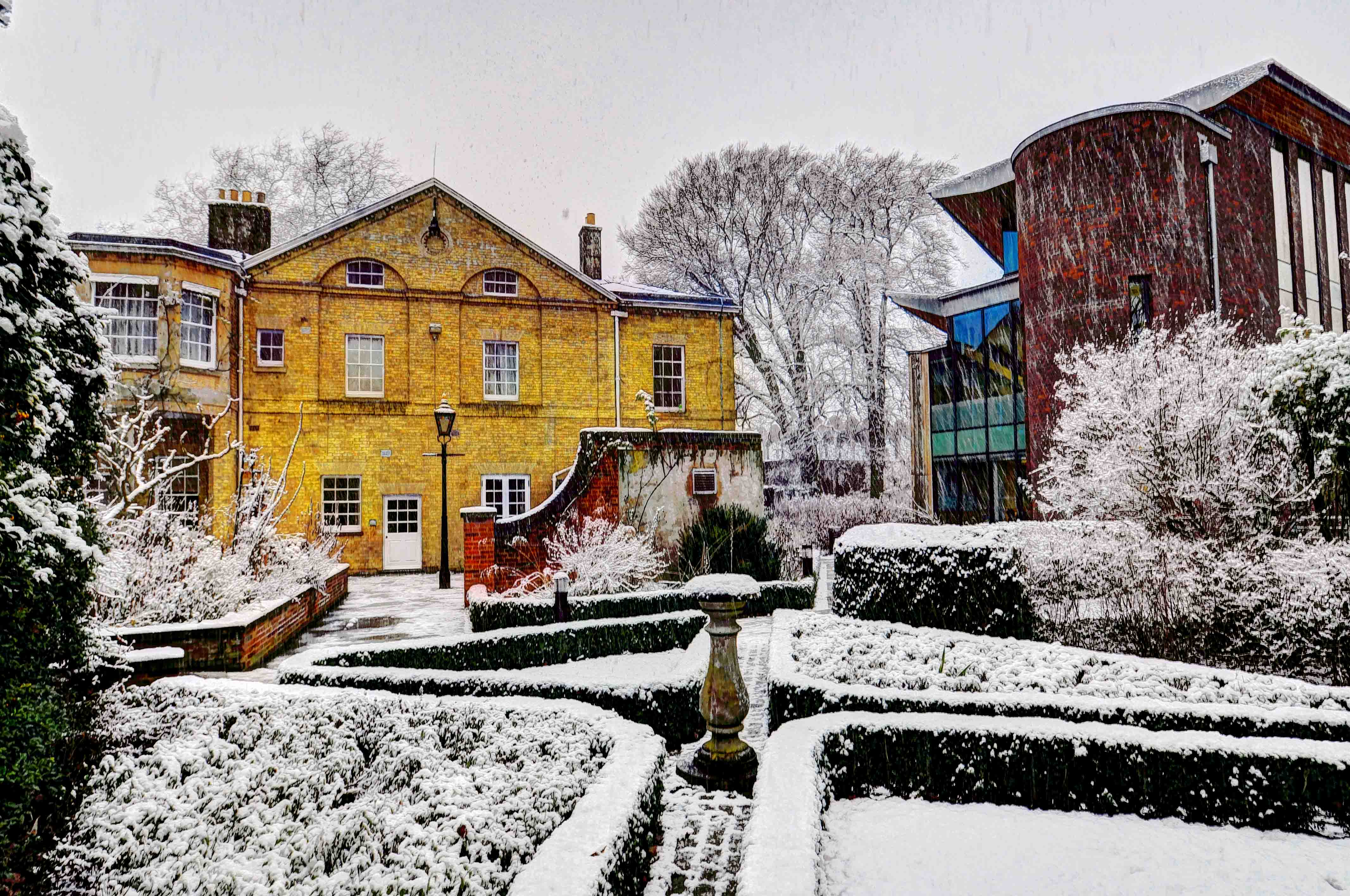
Fitzwilliam College, Cambridge, where Drake studied English literature

Drake returned to England in 1967 and moved into his sister's flat in Hampstead, London. That October, he enrolled at Cambridge to begin his studies in English literature. His tutors found him bright but unenthusiastic and unwilling to apply himself. One of his biographers, Trevor Dann, notes that he had difficulty connecting with staff and fellow students, and that matriculation photographs from this time portray a sullen young man. Cambridge placed emphasis on its rugby and cricket teams, but Drake had lost interest in sport, preferring to stay in his college room smoking cannabis and playing music. According to fellow student Brian Wells, "They were the rugger buggers and we were the cool people smoking dope."

== Career ==
In January 1968, Drake met Robert Kirby, a music student who went on to write many of the string and woodwind arrangements for Drake's first two albums. By this time, Drake had discovered the British and American folk music scenes, and was influenced by performers such as Bob Dylan, Donovan, Van Morrison, Josh White and Phil Ochs (he later cited Randy Newman and the Beach Boys as influences). He began performing in local clubs and coffee houses around London, and in December 1967, while playing at a five-day event at the Roundhouse in Camden Town, made an impression on Ashley Hutchings, bass player with Fairport Convention. Hutchings recalls being impressed by Drake's guitar skill, but even more so by his image: "He looked like a star. He looked wonderful, he seemed to be 7 ft [tall]."

Hutchings introduced Drake to the 25-year-old American producer Joe Boyd, owner of the production and management company Witchseason Productions, which at the time was licensed to Island Records. Boyd, who had discovered Fairport Convention and introduced John Martyn and the Incredible String Band to a mainstream audience, was a respected figure in the UK folk scene. He and Drake formed an immediate bond, and Boyd acted as a mentor to Drake throughout his career. Impressed by a four-track demo recorded in Drake's college room in early 1968, Boyd offered Drake a management, publishing, and production contract. Boyd recalled listening to a reel-to-reel home recording Drake had made: "Halfway through the first song, I felt this was pretty special. And I called him up, and he came back in, and we talked, and I just said, 'I'd like to make a record.' He stammered, 'Oh, well, yeah. Okay.' Nick was a man of few words." According to Drake's friend Paul Wheeler, Drake had already decided not to complete his third year at Cambridge and was excited about the contract.

=== Five Leaves Left (1969) ===
Drake recorded his debut album Five Leaves Left later in 1968, with Boyd as producer. He had to skip lectures to travel by train to the sessions in Sound Techniques studio, London. Inspired by John Simon's production of Leonard Cohen's 1967 album Songs of Leonard Cohen, Boyd was keen to record Drake's voice in a similar close and intimate style, "with no shiny pop reverb". He sought to include a string arrangement similar to Simon's, "without overwhelming ... or sounding cheesy". To provide backing, Boyd enlisted contacts from the London folk rock scene, including Fairport Convention guitarist Richard Thompson and Pentangle bassist Danny Thompson (no relation).

Initial recordings did not go well: the sessions were irregular and rushed, taking place during studio downtime borrowed from Fairport Convention's production of their Unhalfbricking album. Tension arose as to the direction of the album: Boyd was an advocate of George Martin's approach of using the studio as an instrument, while Drake preferred a more organic sound. Dann observed that Drake appears "tight and anxious" on bootleg recordings from the sessions, and notes a number of Boyd's unsuccessful attempts at instrumentation. Both were unhappy with arranger Richard Anthony Hewson's contribution, which they felt was too mainstream for Drake's songs. Drake suggested his college friend Robert Kirby as a replacement. Though Boyd was sceptical about taking on an inexperienced amateur music student, he was impressed by Drake's uncharacteristic assertiveness and agreed to a trial. Kirby had previously presented Drake with some arrangements for his songs. While Kirby provided most arrangements for the album, its centrepiece, "River Man", which echoed the tone of Frederick Delius, was orchestrated by the veteran composer Harry Robertson.

Post-production difficulties delayed the release by several months, and the album was poorly marketed and supported. In July, Melody Maker described Five Leaves Left as "poetic" and "interesting", though NME wrote in October that there was "not nearly enough variety to make it entertaining". It received little radio play outside shows by more progressive BBC DJs such as John Peel and Bob Harris. Drake was unhappy with the inlay sleeve, which printed songs in the wrong running order and reproduced verses omitted from the recorded versions. In an interview, his sister Gabrielle said: "He was very secretive. I knew he was making an album but I didn't know what stage of completion it was at until he walked into my room and said, 'There you are.' He threw it onto the bed and walked out!"

=== Bryter Layter (1971) ===
Drake ended his studies at Cambridge nine months before graduation and in late 1969 moved to London. His father remembered "writing him long letters, pointing out the disadvantages of going away from Cambridge ... a degree was a safety net, if you manage to get a degree, at least you have something to fall back on; his reply to that was that a safety net was the one thing he did not want." Drake spent his first few months in London drifting from place to place, occasionally staying at his sister's Kensington flat but usually sleeping on friends' sofas and floors. Eventually, in an attempt to bring some stability and a telephone into Drake's life, Boyd organised and paid for a ground floor bedsit in Belsize Park, Camden.

On 5 August 1969, Drake pre-recorded four songs for the BBC's Night Ride radio show presented by John Peel ("Cello Song", "Three Hours", "River Man" and "Time of No Reply"), which were broadcast after midnight on 6 August. Nick subsequently recorded "Bryter Layter" for another BBC radio broadcast, in April 1970. A month after the initial BBC recordings, on 24 September, he opened for Fairport Convention at the Royal Festival Hall in London, followed by appearances at folk clubs in Birmingham and Hull. According to the folk singer Michael Chapman, the audiences did not appreciate Drake and wanted "songs with choruses". Chapman said: "They completely missed the point. He didn't say a word the entire evening. It was actually quite painful to watch. I don't know what the audience expected, I mean, they must have known they weren't going to get sea-shanties and sing-alongs at a Nick Drake gig!"

The experience reinforced Drake's decision to retreat from live appearances; the few concerts he did play were usually brief, awkward, and poorly attended. Drake seemed reluctant to perform and rarely addressed his audience. As many of his songs were played in different tunings, he frequently paused to retune between numbers. Although Five Leaves Left attracted little publicity, Boyd was keen to build on what momentum there was. Drake's second album, Bryter Layter (1971), again produced by Boyd and engineered by John Wood, introduced a more upbeat, jazzier sound. Disappointed by his debut's poor sales, Drake sought to move away from his pastoral sound and agreed to Boyd's suggestions to include bass and drum tracks. "It was more of a pop sound, I suppose," Boyd later said. "I imagined it as more commercial." Like its predecessor, the album featured musicians from Fairport Convention, as well as contributions from John Cale on two songs: "Northern Sky" and "Fly". Trevor Dann noted that while sections of "Northern Sky" sound more characteristic of Cale, the song was the closest Drake came to a release with chart potential.

Bryter Layter was a commercial failure, and reviews were again mixed; Record Mirror praised Drake as a "beautiful guitarist—clean and with perfect timing, [and] accompanied by soft, beautiful arrangements", but Melody Maker described the album as "an awkward mix of folk and cocktail jazz". Soon after its release, Boyd sold Witchseason to Island Records and moved to Los Angeles to work with Warner Brothers to develop film soundtracks. The loss of his mentor, coupled with the album's poor sales, led Drake into further depression. His attitude to London had changed: he was unhappy living alone, and visibly nervous and uncomfortable performing at a series of concerts in early 1970. In June, Drake gave one of his final live appearances at Ewell Technical College, Surrey. Ralph McTell, who also performed that night, remembered: "Nick was monosyllabic. At that particular gig he was very shy. He did the first set and something awful must have happened. He was doing his song 'Fruit Tree' and walked off halfway through it."

Island Records urged Drake to promote Bryter Layter through interviews, radio sessions, and live appearances. Drake refused. Disappointed by the reaction to Bryter Layter, he turned inwards and withdrew from family and friends.

=== Pink Moon (1972) ===
Although Island had not expected a third album, Drake approached Wood in October 1971 to begin work on what would be his final release. Sessions took place over two nights, with only Drake and Wood in the studio. The bleak songs of Pink Moon are short, and the eleven-track album lasts only 28 minutes, a length described by Wood as "just about right. You really wouldn't want it to be any longer." Drake had expressed dissatisfaction with the sound of Bryter Layter, and believed that the string, brass, and saxophone arrangements resulted in a sound that was "too full, too elaborate". Drake appears on Pink Moon accompanied only by his own carefully recorded guitar save for a piano overdub on the title track. Wood later said: "He was very determined to make this very stark, bare record. He definitely wanted it to be him more than anything. And I think, in some ways, Pink Moon is probably more like Nick is than the other two records."

Drake delivered the tapes of Pink Moon to Chris Blackwell at Island Records, contrary to a popular legend which claims that he dropped them off at the receptionist's desk without saying a word. An advertisement for the album in Melody Maker in February opened with "Pink Moon—Nick Drake's latest album: the first we heard of it was when it was finished." Pink Moon sold fewer copies than its predecessors, although it received some favourable reviews. In Zigzag, Connor McKnight wrote: "Nick Drake is an artist who never fakes. The album makes no concession to the theory that music should be escapist. It's simply one musician's view of life at the time, and you can't ask for more than that."

Blackwell felt Pink Moon had the potential to bring Drake to a mainstream audience; however, his staff were disappointed by Drake's unwillingness to promote it. A&R manager Muff Winwood recalled "tearing his hair out" in frustration and said that without Blackwell's enthusiastic support "the rest of us would have given him the boot". At Boyd's insistence, Drake agreed to an interview with Jerry Gilbert of Sounds Magazine. The "shy and introverted" Drake spoke of his dislike of live appearances and little else. "There wasn't any connection whatsoever," Gilbert said. "I don't think he made eye contact with me once." Disheartened and convinced he would be unable to write again, Drake retired from music. He toyed with the idea of a different career and considered the army. His three albums had together sold fewer than 4,000 copies.

=== Later career (1973–74) ===
In February 1973, Drake contacted John Wood, saying he was ready to begin work on a fourth album. Boyd was in England at the time and agreed to attend the recordings. The initial session was followed by recordings in July 1974. In his 2006 autobiography, Boyd recalled being taken aback at Drake's anger and bitterness: "[He said that] I had told him he was a genius, and others had concurred. Why wasn't he famous and rich? This rage must have festered beneath that inexpressive exterior for years." Boyd and Wood noticed a deterioration in Drake's performance, requiring him to overdub his voice separately over the guitar. However, the return to the Sound Techniques studio raised Drake's spirits; his mother recalled, "We were so absolutely thrilled to think that Nick was happy because there hadn't been any happiness in Nick's life for years."

== Personal life ==
In 1971, Drake's family persuaded him to visit a psychiatrist at St Thomas' Hospital in London. He was prescribed antidepressants, but felt uncomfortable and embarrassed about taking them, and tried to hide the fact from his friends. He worried about their side effects and was concerned that they would react with his regular cannabis use. By this time, Drake was smoking what Kirby described as "unbelievable amounts" of cannabis and exhibiting "the first signs of psychosis". He rarely left his flat, and then only to play an occasional concert or to buy drugs. According to photographer Keith Morris, by 1971 Drake was a "hunched, dishevelled figure, staring vacantly...ignoring the overtures of a friendly labrador or gazing blankly over Hampstead Heath." His sister recalled: "This was a very bad time. He once said to me that everything started to go wrong from [this] time on, and I think that was when things started to go wrong."

In the months following Pink Moon's release, Drake became increasingly asocial and distant. He returned to live at his parents' home in Tanworth-in-Arden, and while he resented the regression, he accepted that it was necessary. "I don't like it at home," he told his mother, "but I can't bear it anywhere else." His return was often difficult for his family, as Gabrielle said: "Good days in my parents' home were good days for Nick, and bad days were bad days for Nick. And that was what their life revolved around, really."

Drake lived a frugal existence; his only income was a £20-a-week retainer from Island Records (equivalent to £217 in 2025). At one point he could not afford a new pair of shoes. He would disappear for days, sometimes arriving unannounced at friends' houses, uncommunicative and withdrawn. Robert Kirby described a typical visit: "He would arrive and not talk, sit down, listen to music, have a smoke, have a drink, sleep there the night, and two or three days later he wasn't there, he'd be gone. And three months later he'd be back." Nick's supervision partner at Cambridge, John Venning, saw him on an underground train in London and felt he was seriously depressed: "There was something about him which suggested that he would have looked straight through me and not registered me at all. So I turned around."

Drake was a close friend of fellow folk musicians John and Beverley Martyn, and visited them regularly when they lived in London and subsequently Hastings. Martyn later wrote the title song of his 1973 album Solid Air about Drake and described him, in this period, as the most withdrawn person he had ever met. Drake would borrow his mother's car and drive for hours without purpose, until he ran out of petrol and had to ring his parents to ask to be collected. Friends recalled the extent to which his appearance had changed. During particularly bleak periods, he refused to wash his hair or cut his nails. Early in 1972, Drake had a nervous breakdown, and was hospitalised for five weeks. He was initially believed to have major depression, although his former therapist suggested he had schizophrenia.

By late 1974, Drake's weekly retainer from Island had ceased, and his depression meant that he remained in contact with only a few close friends. He had tried to stay in touch with Sophia Ryde, whom he had met in London in 1968. Ryde has been described by Drake's biographers as "the nearest thing" to a girlfriend in his life, but she used the description "best (girl) friend". In a 2005 interview, Ryde said that a week before he died, she had sought to end the relationship: "I couldn't cope with it. I asked him for some time. And I never saw him again." John Martyn claimed to have had a heated argument with Drake around a month before the latter's death which was never reconciled. Phill Brown later said that this "destroyed" Martyn.

Drake's perceived inability to connect has led to speculation about his sexuality. Boyd detected a virginal quality in Drake's lyrics and music and notes that he never knew of him behaving in a sexual way with anyone, male or female. Ian MacDonald, who was distantly acquainted with Drake at Cambridge, wrote that he "was probably fonder of sex than has been suggested so far, but otherwise he held aloof from worldly attachment". The claim that Drake died a virgin has been falsely attributed to his sister Gabrielle, who responded that "I never said any such thing because I don't know! I have no idea. And I don't mind what he was."

== Death ==
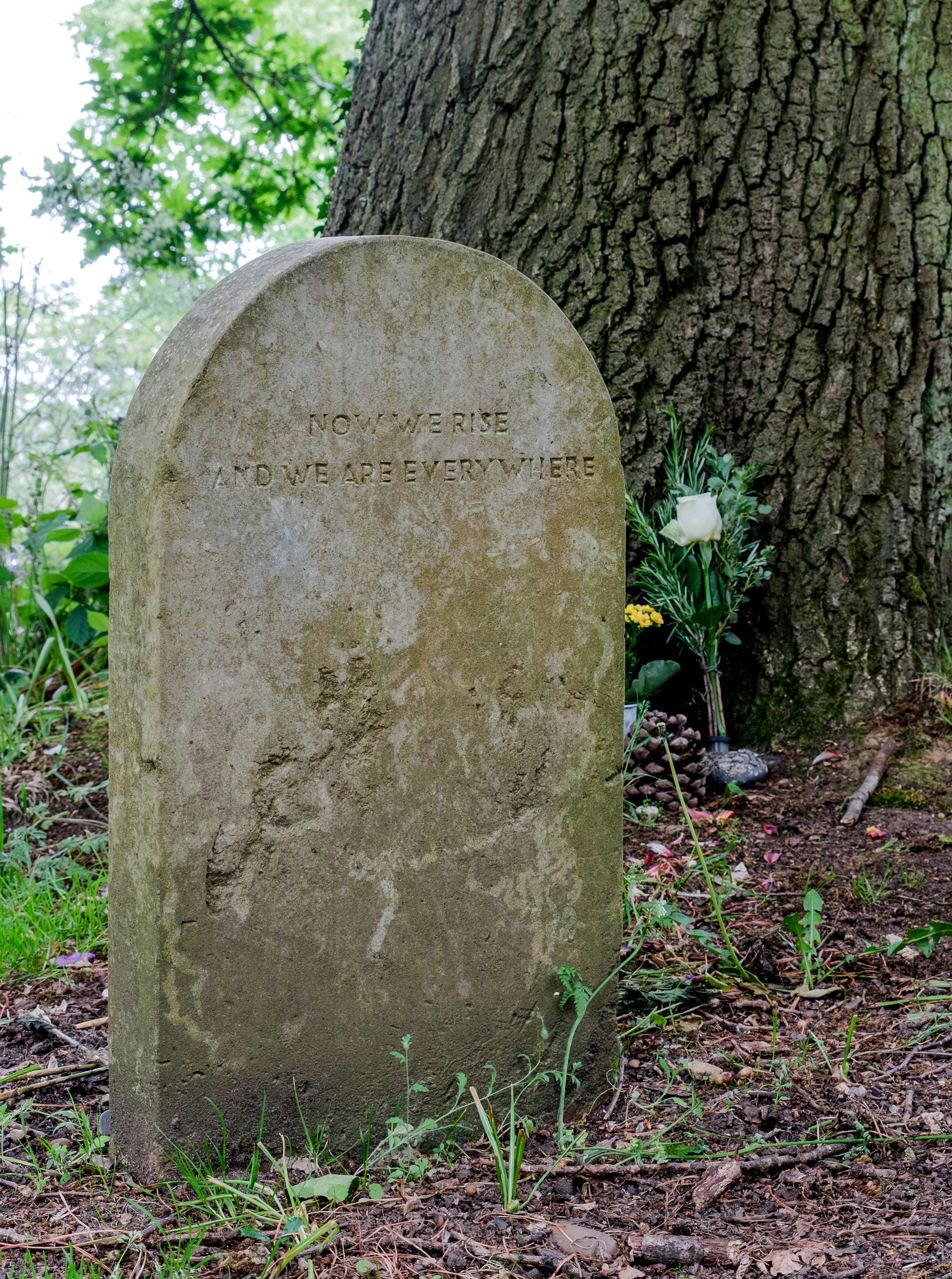
The grave where Drake's ashes are buried with those of his parents. The gravestone is inscribed with the epitaph "Now we rise / And we are everywhere", taken from the lyrics of "From the Morning", the final song on Drake's final album, Pink Moon.

During the early hours of 25 November 1974, Drake died in his bedroom at Far Leys. He had gone to bed early after spending the afternoon visiting a friend. His mother said that around dawn he left his room for the kitchen. His family had heard him do this many times before, and presumed he was eating cereal. He returned to his room a short while later, where it is believed that he took an overdose of amitriptyline, an antidepressant.

Drake had been accustomed to keeping his own hours; he frequently had difficulty sleeping and often stayed up through the night playing and listening to music, then slept late into the following morning. His mother later said: "I never used to disturb him at all. But it was about 12 o'clock, and I went in, because really it seemed it was time he got up. And he was lying across the bed. The first thing I saw was his long, long legs." According to Rodney Drake's personal diary, Nick's body was first discovered by their housemaid who looked in on Drake around 11:45 and called out to Molly who went in to discover he was dead. There was no suicide note, although a letter addressed to Ryde was found close to his bed. At the inquest on 18 December, the coroner stated that the cause of death was "Acute amitriptyline poisoning—self-administered when suffering from a depressive illness" and concluded a verdict of suicide. The inquest revealed "a minimum of 35 [amitriptyline] pills' worth from stomach samples and up to a further 50 from blood samples".

On 2 December 1974, after a service in the Church of St Mary Magdalene, Tanworth-in-Arden, Drake's remains were cremated at Solihull Crematorium and his ashes interred under an oak tree in the church's graveyard. The funeral was attended by around fifty mourners, including friends from Marlborough, Aix, Cambridge, London, Tanworth and Witchseason Productions. Referring to Drake's tendency to compartmentalise relationships, Brian Wells observed that many met each other for the first time that morning. His mother recalled "a lot of his young friends came up here. We'd never met many of them."

== Musical and lyrical style ==
Boyd wrote that "the roots of Nick's harmonies" were in his mother's piano playing, which drew from West End acts such as Noël Coward, Sandy Wilson, and Julian Slade. As a teenager, Drake learned songs by Bob Dylan, Paul Simon, and Peter, Paul and Mary on guitar, having been particularly affected by Dylan's "A Hard Rain's a-Gonna Fall". Boyd additionally listed Django Reinhardt, Miles Davis, Bert Jansch, and Donovan as influences and speculated that Drake was familiar with bossa nova, specifically with the Brazilian guitarist João Gilberto. The string arrangement for "River Man" was done in the style of Frederick Delius and according to Kirby, the instrumental tracks on Bryter Layter were inspired by the Beach Boys' Pet Sounds and the 5th Dimension's The Magic Garden. Similarities have been noted between Drake's compositions and the work of Johann Sebastian Bach; Drake was listening to Bach's Brandenburg Concertos on the night he died.

Drake was obsessive about practising his guitar technique and would stay up through the night writing and experimenting with alternative tunings. His mother remembered hearing him "bumping around at all hours. I think he wrote his nicest melodies in the early morning hours." Self-taught, he achieved his guitar style through the use of alternative tunings to create cluster chords, which are difficult to achieve on a guitar using standard tuning. Similarly, many of his vocal melodies rest on the extensions of chords, not just on notes of the triad. He sang in the baritone range, often quietly and with little projection.

Drake was drawn to the works of William Blake, William Butler Yeats, and Henry Vaughan, whose influences are reflected in his lyrics. He also employed a series of elemental symbols and codes, largely drawn from nature. The moon, stars, sea, rain, trees, sky, mist, and seasons are all commonly used, influenced in part by his rural upbringing. Images related to summer figure centrally in his early work; from Bryter Layter on, his language is more autumnal, evoking a season commonly used to convey senses of loss and sorrow. Throughout, Drake writes with detachment, more as an observer than a participant, a point of view Rolling Stone's Anthony DeCurtis described "as if he were viewing his life from a great, unbridgeable distance". Kirby described Drake's lyrics as a "series of extremely vivid, complete observations, almost like a series of epigrammatic proverbs", though he doubts that Drake saw himself as "any sort of poet". Instead, Kirby believes that Drake's lyrics were crafted to "complement and compound a mood that the melody dictates in the first place".

== Posthumous popularity and legacy ==
There were no documentaries or compilation albums in the wake of Drake's death. His public profile remained low throughout the 1970s, although his name appeared occasionally in the music press. By this time, his parents were receiving an increasing number of fans at the family home. Following a 1975 NME article by Nick Kent, Island Records said they had no plans to reissue Drake's albums, but in 1979 Rob Partridge joined Island Records as press officer and commissioned the release of the Fruit Tree box set. The release compiled Drake's three studio albums, the four tracks he recorded with Wood in 1974 and an extensive biography written by the American journalist Arthur Lubow. Although sales were poor, Island Records did not delete the albums from its catalogue.

By the mid-1980s, Drake was being cited as an influence by musicians such as Kate Bush, Paul Weller, the Black Crowes, Peter Buck of R.E.M. and Robert Smith of the Cure. Drake gained further exposure in 1985 when the Dream Academy included a dedication to Drake on the sleeve of its hit single "Life in a Northern Town". In 1986 a biography of Drake by Gorm Henrik Rasmussen was published in Danish; an updated version with new interviews was published in English in 2012. By the end of the 1980s his name was appearing regularly in music magazines and newspapers in the UK, where he frequently was cast in the role of the "doomed romantic hero". The earliest Drake profile in a US magazine was the article "Hanging On A Star" by the AllMusic critic Peter Kurtz, which appeared in the 3 September 1993 issue of Goldmine.

The first biography of Drake in English was published in November 1997 by Patrick Humphries. On 20 June 1998, BBC Radio 2 broadcast a documentary, Fruit Tree: The Nick Drake Story, featuring interviews with Boyd, Wood, Gabrielle and Molly Drake, Paul Wheeler, Robert Kirby and Ashley Hutchings, and narrated by Danny Thompson. In early 1999, BBC Two broadcast a 40-minute documentary, A Stranger Among Us—In Search of Nick Drake. The following year, Dutch director Jeroen Berkvens released the documentary A Skin Too Few: The Days of Nick Drake, featuring interviews with Boyd, Gabrielle Drake, Wood and Kirby. Later that year, The Guardian named Bryter Layter the best alternative album of all time.

In 1999, "Pink Moon" was used in a Volkswagen commercial, boosting Drake's US album sales from about 6,000 copies in 1999 to 74,000 in 2000. The Los Angeles Times saw this as an example of how, following the consolidation of US radio stations, previously unknown music was finding audiences through advertising. Fans used the filesharing software Napster to circulate digital copies of Drake's music. According to The Atlantic, "The chronic shyness and mental illness that made it hard for Drake to compete with 1970s showmen like Elton John and David Bowie didn't matter when his songs were being pulled one by one out of the ether and played late at night in a dorm room."

Over the following years Drake's songs have appeared in soundtracks for films such as The Royal Tenenbaums, Serendipity and Garden State. Made to Love Magic, an album of outtakes and remixes released by Island Records in 2004, far exceeded Drake's lifetime sales. In November 2014, Gabrielle Drake published a companion to her brother's music, Nick Drake: Remembered for a While. A 10" live EP, titled The John Peel Session, released alongside the book. An authorised biography by Richard Morton Jack was published in June 2023, with a foreword by Gabrielle Drake. Other contemporary artists influenced by Drake include Mikael Åkerfeldt of Opeth, José González, Iron & Wine, Bon Iver, Alexi Murdoch, Philip Selway of Radiohead, Steven Wilson, and Brian Molko of Placebo.

== Discography ==
- Five Leaves Left (1969)
- Bryter Layter (1971)
- Pink Moon (1972)
