= Five Leaves Left =

Studio album by Nick Drake
- Released: 3 July 1969
- Recorded: May 1968 – April 1969
- Studios: Sound Techniques, London
- Genres: Folk; folk-pop; chamber folk; folk rock
- Length: 41:43
- Label: Island
- Producer: Joe Boyd

Nick Drake chronology
Five Leaves Left (1969)	Bryter Layter (1971)

Five Leaves Left is the debut studio album by English folk musician Nick Drake. Recorded between 1968 and 1969, it was released in 1969 by Island Records.

== Background and recording ==
Five Leaves Left was recorded between May 1968 and April 1969 at Sound Techniques in London, England. Engineer John Wood recalled that "[Drake] would track live, singing and playing along with the string section" without the use of any overdubbing. For the song "River Man", producer Joe Boyd described Drake playing on a stool in the centre of the studio while surrounded by a semi-circle of instruments. The studio's environment was also an important factor as it had multiple levels to it which enabled the creation of interesting sounds and atmospheres.

Among his various backing musicians, Drake was accompanied by Richard Thompson from Fairport Convention and Danny Thompson of Pentangle. Robert Kirby, a friend of Drake's from Cambridge University, arranged the stringed instruments for several tracks while Harry Robinson arranged the strings for "River Man". The title of the album is a reference to the old Rizla cigarette papers packet, which used to contain a printed note near the end saying "Only five leaves left".

== Composition and music ==
Ned Raggett of AllMusic characterized Drake's performance on the album as "steer[ing] a careful balance between too-easy accessibility and maudlin self-reflection," and his vocals as "soft [and] articulate." He described the lyrics as "captur[ing] a subtle poetry of emotion." He assessed, "Having grown out of the amiable but derivative styles captured on the long-circulating series of bootleg home recordings, Drake imbues his tunes with just enough drama -- world-weariness in the vocals, carefully paced playing, and more -- to make it all work." Five Leaves Left has been described as folk, folk-pop, chamber folk, and folk rock.

== Critical reception ==
Reviews of the album in the months following its release were mixed. The brief review in Melody Maker discussed the origins of the album's title and added simply, "It sounds poetic and so does composer, singer and guitarist Nick Drake. His debut album for Island is interesting." Rating the album three out of four stars, Disc and Music Echo also described the album as "interesting" and said, "His guitar work is soft, gentle and tuneful; his voice highly attractive, husky and bluesy—but his songs uncertain and indirect." It concluded, "It's more a restful album than a stimulating one." In October 1969 Gordon Coxhill of the NME expressed his disappointment with the record, saying, "I'm sorry I can't be more enthusiastic because he obviously has a not inconsiderable amount of talent, but there is not nearly enough variety on this debut LP to make it entertaining. His voice reminds me very much of Peter Sarstedt, but his songs lack Sarstedt's penetration and arresting quality." A review the same month by Maurice Rosenbaum in The Daily Telegraph was more positive, describing the record as an "excellent LP of [Drake's] own songs", and observing, "His voice is slow, reflective and warm, and although the verse structure tends to melodic monotony, there is no mistaking the quality and the promise of 'River Man', 'The Thoughts of Mary Jane', 'Man in a Shed' and other items on this disc".

Professional ratings
Legacy reviews
Review scores
Source	Rating
AllMusic	5/5 stars
The Encyclopedia of Popular Music	5/5 stars
Entertainment Weekly	A
NME	9/10
Pitchfork	9.5/10
Q	4/5 stars
The Rolling Stone Album Guide	5/5 stars
Uncut	4/5 stars

Though Drake had sold relatively few albums by his death in 1974, his work began to attract critical and commercial attention by the end of the 1980s. A 1989 retrospective assessment of Five Leaves Left by Len Brown in NME awarded the album 9/10 and stated that it "remains a masterpiece of English melancholy; a moving work that first revealed Drake's remarkable talent to communicate his fears of passing light and life, with simple beauty; his skill to charge listeners with emotions equal to his own". Including it in a 1999 list of twelve of "the best folk albums of all time", Q in 1999 called it "the pinnacle of a melancholy canon of work so distinctive that admirers can only speculate miserably on what might have been". A 2007 review by Chris Jones for the BBC said, "it's hard not to be still floored by the beauty of [Drake's] first album" and lauded its "unique vision" mixing elements of English folk music and jazz.

The release of the remastered version in 2000 resulted in further positive retrospective reviews from music magazines. John Harris wrote in Q that "the record's abiding impression" was of "a hesitant, slightly troubled soul peering at the straight world and wondering what will become of both him and the people he beholds". In Uncut Ian MacDonald said, "A fine debut, Five Leaves Left would have been stronger still had 'I Was Made to Love Magic' and 'Time of No Reply' been used instead of 'Thoughts of Mary Jane' and 'Man in a Shed' ... This aside, the album remains singular – cool and shady amid the celebratory sunshine of the late Sixties." Alternative Press called it "[one] of the most beautiful and melancholy albums ever recorded".

Ned Raggett of AllMusic wrote: "[Drake's performance] steered a careful balance between too-easy accessibility and maudlin self-reflection, combining the best of both worlds while avoiding the pitfalls on either side. The result was a fantastic debut appearance, and if the cult of Drake consistently reads more into his work than is perhaps deserved, Five Leaves Left is still a most successful effort."

=== Accolades ===
Five Leaves Left has regularly appeared on lists of the best albums of all time. The album was ranked number 283 on Rolling Stone magazine's original 2003 list of "The 500 Greatest Albums of All Time". NME ranked it at number 258 on their 2013 list of "NME's The 500 Greatest Albums of All Time", noting that "his maudlin songs are brought vividly to life with orchestration from Fairport Convention, Pentangle and arranger Robert Kirby". A list of the "200 Greatest Albums of All Time" in Uncut in 2016 placed the album at number 183.

A list of "The 100 Greatest Debut Albums" in Uncut in 2006 placed Five Leaves Left at number 29. The record was also included in a list of "Debut Albums That Changed Music" in Q magazine in 2017. In a 2007 Mojo article titled "100 Records That Changed the World" Five Leaves Left was placed at number 78. It is also included in the book 1001 Albums You Must Hear Before You Die, which called it "a remarkable work: stuffed with complex, introspective music but leavened with arrangements and production straight off the top shelf ... the record is full of glittering, warm sounds that have not aged a jot in the interim", and concluded that Drake "rarely excelled himself more than on this first album". It was voted number 55 in Colin Larkin's All Time Top 1000 Albums 3rd Edition (2000).

== The Making of Five Leaves Left ==
In July 2025, Island Records released The Making of Five Leaves Left, a four-disc box set featuring outtakes and alternative versions of songs from the album, as well as other songs not featured on Five Leaves Left. The original album is also included in the box set.

== Track listing ==
All tracks are written by Nick Drake.

Side A
No.	Title	Length
1.	"Time Has Told Me"	4:27
2.	"River Man"	4:21
3.	"Three Hours"	6:16
4.	"Way to Blue"	3:11
5.	"Day Is Done"	2:29

Side B
No.	Title	Length
6.	"'Cello Song"	4:49
7.	"The Thoughts of Mary Jane"	3:22
8.	"Man in a Shed"	3:55
9.	"Fruit Tree"	4:50
10.	"Saturday Sun"	4:03

== Personnel ==
- Nick Drake – vocals; acoustic guitar (1–3, 5–9); piano (10)

=== Additional musicians ===
- Paul Harris – piano (1, 8)
- Richard Thompson – electric guitar (1)
- Danny Thompson – double bass (1–3, 6, 8, 10)
- Harry Robinson – string arrangement (2)
- Rocky Dzidzornu – congas (3, 6); shaker (6)
- Robert Kirby – string arrangement (4, 5, 7, 9)
- Clare Lowther – cello (6)
- Lyn Dobson – flute (7)
- Tristan Fry – drums, vibraphone (10)
- uncredited – oboe, bass oboe, English horn (9)

=== Technical ===
- Simon Heyworth – mastering
- Joe Boyd – production
- John Wood – engineering
- Keith Morris – photography

== Charts ==
Chart performance for Five Leaves Left
Chart (2025)	Peak position
Scottish Albums (Official Charts)	11
UK Albums (Official Charts)	85

== Release history ==
Region	Date	Label	Format	Catalogue
United Kingdom	3 July 1969	Island	LP	ILPS 9105
United Kingdom	March 1987	Island	CD	CID 9195
United Kingdom	26 June 2000	Island	CD	IMCD 8

== Certifications ==
Region	Certification	Certified units/sales
United Kingdom (BPI) Sales since 2012	Platinum	300,000^{‡}
^{‡} Sales+streaming figures based on certification alone.
