= 68th Annual Grammy Awards =

2026 US music awards ceremony

- Date: February 1, 2026
- Location: Crypto.com Arena; Los Angeles, California
- Hosted by: Trevor Noah

Highlights
- Most awards: Kendrick Lamar (5)
- Most nominations: Kendrick Lamar (9)
- Website: grammy.com

Television/radio coverage
- Network: CBS; Paramount+
- Viewership: 14.4 million

The 68th Annual Grammy Awards honored the best recordings, compositions, and artists from August 31, 2024, to August 30, 2025, as chosen by the members of the Recording Academy, on February 1, 2026. In its 23rd year at Crypto.com Arena in Los Angeles and for the last time since 1973, the ceremony was broadcast on CBS and available to stream on Paramount+. On October 30, 2024, the Recording Academy announced that the Grammys would return to ABC and stream on Hulu and Disney+ beginning in 2027, under a ten-year deal. South African comedian Trevor Noah hosted the ceremony for the sixth consecutive and final time.

Kendrick Lamar was the night's biggest winner for the second consecutive year with five wins, including a second consecutive Record of the Year win with "Luther" and a sweep in the Rap categories, winning Best Rap Album for GNX. His fourth five-win Grammy night in his career, Lamar surpassed Jay-Z to become the most-awarded hip-hop artist in Grammy Awards history. Bad Bunny followed him with three wins, including Album of the Year for Debí Tirar Más Fotos, becoming the first Spanish-language album and third Latino artist to receive the honor. Billie Eilish and her brother Finneas won Song of the Year for "Wildflower", becoming the most-awarded artists in the category in Grammy Awards history with three wins each. Their win also tied them with Adele, Bruno Mars, and Paul Simon for the most wins in the General Field, with seven each. Olivia Dean won Best New Artist, the ninth woman in a row to win the award and the first British winner since Dua Lipa in 2019, while Tyler, The Creator's Chromakopia and Zach Top's Ain't in It for My Health took home the inaugural Best Album Cover and Best Traditional Country Album awards. "Golden" from KPop Demon Hunters won Best Song Written For Visual Media, becoming the first K-pop song to win a Grammy award in any category.

Steven Spielberg won Best Music Film for his role in producing Music by John Williams. This win made him the 22nd person to achieve EGOT status. Although he is not credited in Tony Award records as a winning producer of the musical A Strange Loop (which previously made Jennifer Hudson the 17th EGOT winner, and also counted towards the non-competitive EGOT of Amblin Entertainment co-founder Frank Marshall (Note: A Strange Loop is also noted among the wins of 20th & 21st EGOT winners Benj Pasek & Justin Paul, but they also shared in a different Tony Award.)) at the 75th Tony Awards, he nonetheless received a Tony statuette in that capacity, and he is listed as a producer of A Strange Loop in the Internet Broadway Database. Lamar led the Grammy Awards with nine nominations, while Jack Antonoff, Cirkut, and Lady Gaga followed with seven nominations each.

== Background ==
On June 12, 2025, the Recording Academy announced several changes for different categories and updates on eligibility rules for the 2026 ceremony.

=== Category changes ===
- Two new categories – Best Traditional Country Album and Best Album Cover, for 95 categories total.
- Best Country Album was renamed Best Contemporary Country Album.
- Best Boxed or Special Limited Edition Package was merged back into the Best Recording Package category.

=== Criteria amendments ===
- Artists who were previously featured on a record nominated for Album of the Year were eligible to be nominated for Best New Artist if their contributions to the album were 20 percent or less.
- Composers and lyricists/librettists were eligible for Grammy recognition in selected categories in the Classical Field (Best Orchestral Performance, Best Choral Performance, Best Chamber Music/Small Ensemble Performance, Best Classical Instrumental Solo, and Best Classical Solo Vocal Album). Previously, only the album's artist/s, producers, and engineers would receive recognition.
- The maximum number of principal vocalist(s) who may be awarded in the Best Musical Theater Album category was increased from four to six.
- The physical product eligibility requirement for Best Recording Package, Best Album Notes, and Best Historical Album was expanded to be more representative of the current marketplace to ensure that physical album packages sold directly to fans through an artist's or label's website were eligible for Grammy consideration.
- The Craft Committee serving the Package, Notes & Historical field switched from a regional to a national model.
- Minor description updates to the Best Regional Roots Music Album, Best Progressive R&B Album, Best Dance Pop Recording, Best American Roots Performance, and Best American Roots Song categories.

=== Membership amendments ===
- 3,800 new music creators and professionals were invited to join the Recording Academy. Of these, 50% were age 39 or younger, 58% were people of color, and 35% identified as women.
- On November 4, 2025, it was announced that, for the first time in Grammy history, members who vote for the Latin Grammy Awards were invited to join the Recording Academy. As a result, 28% of all new members in 2025 identified as Hispanic or Latino.

=== Process amendments ===
- The 2026 Grammy ballots will be presented in a randomized order for the first time, rather than in alphabetical order. Of the change, chief awards and global industry officer for the Recording Academy, Ruby Marchand, stated, "This ballot update brings our process in line with standard voting best practices ... and further ensures the process is fair and equitable for all entries." It was speculated that the change was implemented to encourage voters to familiarize themselves with the entire ballot rather than defaulting to favorite artists/work, and to prevent artists who are listed first alphabetically from having an unfair advantage.

== Performers ==
=== Premiere ceremony ===
Premiere ceremony performers were announced on January 28, 2026.

List of performers
| Artist(s) | Song(s) |
|---|---|
| Israel Houghton Grace Potter Lila Iké Maggie Rose Trombone Shorty | "Shining Star" |
| Zara Larsson | "Midnight Sun" |
| Spiritbox | "Soft Spine" |
| Tasha Cobbs Leonard | "Church" |
| Darren Criss Helen J. Shen Will Aronson | "Maybe Happy Ending" |

=== Main ceremony ===
Sabrina Carpenter was announced as the first performer on January 20, 2026. On January 21, all eight nominees for Best New Artist were announced as performers. Clipse and Pharrell Williams were announced on January 22. Justin Bieber and the In Memoriam performers were announced on January 28. Lady Gaga, Rosé and Tyler, the Creator were announced the following day. Bruno Mars was announced on January 30.

List of performers at the 68th Annual Grammy Awards
| Artist(s) | Song(s) |
|---|---|
| Rosé Bruno Mars | "APT." |
| Sabrina Carpenter | "Manchild" |
| The Marías Addison Rae Katseye Leon Thomas Alex Warren Lola Young Olivia Dean Sombr | Best New Artist Medley "No One Noticed" "Fame Is a Gun" "Gnarly" "Mutt" "Ordinary" "Messy" "Man I Need" "12 to 12" |
| Justin Bieber | "Yukon" |
| Lady Gaga | "Abracadabra" |
| Bruno Mars The Hooligans | "I Just Might" |
| Tyler, the Creator | "Thought I Was Dead" "Like Him" (with Regina King) "Sugar on My Tongue" |
| Reba McEntire Brandy Clark Lukas Nelson | In Memoriam "Trailblazer" |
| Post Malone Duff McKagan Slash Chad Smith Andrew Watt | Tribute to Ozzy Osbourne "War Pigs" |
| Lauryn Hill Lucky Daye Raphael Saadiq Anthony Hamilton Leon Thomas Bilal Alexia Jayy Jon Batiste Leon Bridges Lalah Hathaway October London John Legend Chaka Khan Wyclef Jean | Tribute to D'Angelo and Roberta Flack "Nothing Even Matters" "Brown Sugar" "Lady" "Devil's Pie" "Another Life" "Untitled (How Does It Feel)" "Africa" "The First Time Ever I Saw Your Face" "Compared to What" "The Closer I Get to You" "Where Is the Love" "Feel Like Makin' Love" "Killing Me Softly with His Song" "Total Praise" |
| Clipse Pharrell Williams Voices of Fire | "So Far Ahead" |

Additionally, Noah Kahan's "The Great Divide" music video, sponsored by Mastercard, premiered during a commercial break after Justin Bieber's performance of "Yukon".

== Presenters ==
Darren Criss was announced as the host of the Premiere Ceremony at the Peacock Theater on February 1, 2026, alongside the list of other presenters and performers. Doechii and Harry Styles were announced as the first set of presenters for the main ceremony. The rest of the presenters were announced on January 29, 2026.

Premiere ceremony

- Darren Criss – host
- Édgar Barrera
- Dee Dee Bridgewater
- Sierra Hull
- Jimmy Jam
- Dave Koz
- Trombone Shorty
- Jesse Welles

Main ceremony

- Doechii and Queen Latifah – presented Best Rap Album
- Chappell Roan – presented Best New Artist
- Marcello Hernández and Karol G – presented Best Música Urbana Album
- Jeff Goldblum and Lainey Wilson – presented Best Contemporary Country Album
- Nikki Glaser and Teyana Taylor – presented Best Pop Vocal Album
- Charli XCX – presented Best Pop Solo Performance
- Carole King – presented Song of the Year
- Q-Tip – presented Dr. Dre Global Impact Award
- Harvey Mason Jr. – introduced Cher
- Cher – presented Record of the Year
- Harry Styles – presented Album of the Year

== Winners and nominees ==
First round voting took place from October 3 to 15, 2025. The nominees were announced by Angélique Kidjo, Brandi Carlile, CeCe Winans, Chappell Roan, David Foster, Doechii, Dr. Chelsey Green, Gayle King, Jon Batiste, Karol G, Little Big Town, Lizzo, Masaki Koike, Mumford & Sons, Nicole Scherzinger, Sabrina Carpenter, and Sam Smith on November 7 in a livestream on the official Grammy YouTube channel. Final round voting took place from December 12, 2025, to January 5, 2026. Winners were revealed during the Grammy Premiere Ceremony and telecast on February 1. The New York Times reported that the awards ceremony was "the most politicized Grammy ceremony in years", with multiple winners using "fiery speeches" and profanity to criticize United States Immigration and Customs Enforcement tactics.

Winners are listed first and highlighted in bold.

=== General Field ===
General Field
**Record of the Year**: **"Luther" – Kendrick Lamar & SZA**; **Jack Antonoff, Scott Bridgeway, M-Tech, Roselilah, Sounwave & Kamasi Washington, producers; Jack Antonoff, Ray Charles Brown Jr., Hector Castro, Oli Jacobs, Jack Manning, Sean Matsukawa, Dani Perez, Tony Austin, Laura Sisk & Johnathan Turner, engineers/mixers; Ruairi O'Flaherty, mastering engineer**; "DTMF" – Bad Bunny; Scotty Dittrich, Julia Lewis, Hydra Hitz, La Paciencia, Mag & Tyler Spry, producers; Antonio Caraballo, Josh Gudwin, Roberto Rosado & Tyler Spry, engineers/mixers; Colin Leonard, mastering engineer; "Manchild" – Sabrina Carpenter; Jack Antonoff & Sabrina Carpenter, producers; Jack Antonoff, Bryce Bordone, Jozef Caldwell, Serban Ghenea, Sean Hutchinson, Oli Jacobs, Michael Riddleberger & Laura Sisk, engineers/mixers; Ruairi O'Flaherty, mastering engineer; "Anxiety" – Doechii; Doechii, producer; Jayda Love, engineer/mixer; Nicolas De Porcel, mastering engineer; "Wildflower" – Billie Eilish; Finneas, producer; Jon Castelli, Aron Forbes & Finneas, engineers/mixers; Dale Becker, mastering engineer; "Abracadabra" – Lady Gaga; Cirkut, Lady Gaga & Andrew Watt, producers; Bryce Bordone, Serban Ghenea & Paul LaMalfa, engineers/mixers; Randy Merrill, mastering engineer; "The Subway" – Chappell Roan; Daniel Nigro, producer; Chris Kasych, Mitch McCarthy & Daniel Nigro, engineers/mixers; Randy Merrill, mastering engineer; "APT." – Rosé & Bruno Mars; Rogét Chahayed, Cirkut, Omer Fedi & Bruno Mars, producers; Bryce Bordone, Serban Ghenea, Charles Moniz & Julian Vasquez, engineers/mixers; Chris Gehringer, mastering engineer
**Album of the Year**: **Debí Tirar Más Fotos – Bad Bunny**; **Big Jay, La Paciencia, Mag & Tainy, producers; Antonio Caraballo, Josh Gudwin, Luis Amed Irizarry & Roberto José Rosado Torres, engineers/mixers; Benito Antonio Martínez Ocasio, Roberto José Rosado Torres, Marco Daniel Borrero, Jay Anthony Nuñez & Marco Efrain Masis, songwriters; Colin Leonard, mastering engineer**; Swag – Justin Bieber; Eddie Benjamin, Justin Bieber, Daniel Chetrit, Dijon, Carter Lang & Dylan Wiggins, producers; Felix Byrne & Josh Gudwin, engineers/mixers; Eddie Benjamin, Justin Bieber, Daniel Chetrit, Dijon Duenas, Tobias Jesso Jr., Carter Lang, Jackson Lee Morgan & Dylan Wiggins, songwriters; Dale Becker, mastering engineer; Man's Best Friend – Sabrina Carpenter; Jack Antonoff, Sabrina Carpenter & John Ryan, producers; Zem Audu, Jack Antonoff, Bryce Bordone, Jozef Caldwell, Serban Ghenea, Jeff Gunnell, David Hart, Mikey Freedom Hart, Sean Hutchinson, Oli Jacobs, Jack Manning, Joey Miller, Michael Riddleberger, John Ryan, Laura Sisk & Evan Smith, engineers/mixers; Amy Allen, Jack Antonoff, Sabrina Carpenter & John Ryan, songwriters; Nathan Dantzler & Ruairi O'Flaherty, mastering engineers; Let God Sort Em Out – Clipse; Pharrell Williams, producer; Mike Larson, Manny Marroquin, Rob Ulsh & Pharrell Williams, engineers/mixers; Gene Elliott Thornton Jr., Terrence Thornton & Pharrell Williams, songwriters; Zach Pereyra, mastering engineer; Mayhem – Lady Gaga; Cirkut, Lady Gaga, Gesaffelstein & Andrew Watt, producers; Bryce Bordone, Serban Ghenea & Paul LaMalfa, engineers/mixers; Henry Walter, Lady Gaga, Mike Lévy, Michael Polansky & Andrew Watt, songwriters; Randy Merrill, mastering engineer; GNX – Kendrick Lamar; Jack Antonoff & Sounwave, producers; Jack Antonoff, Ray Charles Brown Jr., Jozef Caldwell, Oli Jacobs, Jack Manning, Dani Perez, Laura Sisk & Johnathan Turner, engineers/mixers; Jack Antonoff, Ink, Scott Bridgeway, Sam Dew, Kendrick Lamar, Matthew Bernard & Mark Anthony Spears, songwriters; Ruairi O'Flaherty, mastering engineer; Mutt – Leon Thomas; Freaky Rob, Peter Lee Johnson, D. Phelps & Leon Thomas, producers; Jean-Marie Horvat, engineer/mixer; Lazaro Andres Camejo, Freaky Rob, Peter Lee Johnson, D. Phelps & Leon Thomas, songwriters; Dave Kutch, mastering engineer; Chromakopia – Tyler, the Creator; Tyler, the Creator, producer; Neal H Pogue, Tyler Okonma & Vic Wainstein, engineers/mixers; Tyler Okonma, songwriter; Mike Bozzi, mastering engineer
**Song of the Year**: **"Wildflower"**; **Billie Eilish O'Connell & Finneas O'Connell, songwriters (Billie Eilish)**; "Abracadabra"; Henry Walter, Lady Gaga & Andrew Watt, songwriters (Lady Gaga); "Anxiety"; Jaylah Hickmon, songwriter (Doechii); "APT."; Amy Allen, Christopher Brody Brown, Rogét Chahayed, Henry Walter, Omer Fedi, Philip Lawrence, Bruno Mars, Chae Young Park & Theron Thomas, songwriters (Rosé & Bruno Mars); "DTMF"; Benito Antonio Martínez Ocasio, Scott Dittrich, Benjamin Falik, Roberto José Rosado Torres, Marco Daniel Borrero, Hugo René Sención Sanabria & Tyler Spry, songwriters (Bad Bunny); "Golden" (from KPop Demon Hunters); Park Hong Jun, Joong Gyu Kwak, Yu Han Lee, Hee Dong Nam, Jeong Hoon Seo, Ejae & Mark Sonnenblick, songwriters (Huntrix: Ejae, Audrey Nuna & Rei Ami); "Luther"; Jack Antonoff, Roshwita Larisha Bacha, Matthew Bernard, Ink, Scott Bridgeway, Sam Dew, Kendrick Lamar, Mark Anthony Spears, Solána Rowe & Kamasi Washington, songwriters (Kendrick Lamar and SZA); "Manchild"; Amy Allen, Jack Antonoff & Sabrina Carpenter, songwriters (Sabrina Carpenter)
**Best New Artist**: **Olivia Dean**; Katseye; The Marías; Addison Rae; Sombr; Leon Thomas; Alex Warren; Lola Young
| **Producer of the Year, Non-Classical**: **Cirkut**; 1. **"Abracadabra" (Lady Gaga) (S)**; 2. **"AEOMG" (Coco Jones) (T)**; 3. **"APT." (Rosé and Bruno Mars) (S)**; 4. **"Big Sleep" (The Weeknd featuring Giorgio Moroder) (T)**; 5. **"Disease" (Lady Gaga) (S)**; 6. **"It Girl" (Jade) (S)**; 7. **"A Little More" (Ed Sheeran) (S)**; 8. **Mayhem (Lady Gaga) (A)**; 9. **"Red Terror" (The Weeknd) (T)**; Dan Auerbach; 1. "Elegantly Wasted" (Hermanos Gutiérrez featuring Leon Bridges) (S); 2. Harsh & Exciting (Moonrisers) (A); 3. "Holy Ghost Party" (Robert Finley) (S); 4. "Love Is Cruel" (Miles Kane) (S); 5. Medium Raw (Early James) (A); 6. A Million Knives (The Velveteers) (A); 7. No Rain, No Flowers (The Black Keys) (A); 8. Our Time in the Sun (Jeremie Albino) (A); Dijon; 1. Baby (Dijon) (A); 2. "Daisies" (Justin Bieber) (T); 3. "Devotion" (Justin Bieber & Dijon) (T); 4. "Things You Do" (Justin Bieber) (T); 5. "Yukon" (Justin Bieber) (T); Blake Mills; 1. For Melancholy Brunettes (& Sad Women) (Japanese Breakfast) (A); 2. Forever Is a Feeling (Lucy Dacus) (A); 3. Glory (Perfume Genius) (A); 4. That Wasn't a Dream (Pino Palladino and Blake Mills) (A); Sounwave; 1. GNX (Kendrick Lamar) (A) | **Songwriter of the Year, Non-Classical**: **Amy Allen**; 1. **"APT." (Rosé and Bruno Mars) (S)**; 2. **"Bad as the Rest" (Jessie Murph) (S)**; 3. **"Hail Mary" (Shaboozey and Sierra Ferrell) (T)**; 4. **"Handlebars" (Jennie featuring Dua Lipa) (S)**; 5. **"Just Keep Watching" (Tate McRae) (S)**; 6. **"Lost In Translation" (Carín León & Kacey Musgraves) (S)**; 7. **"Manchild" (Sabrina Carpenter) (S)**; 8. **"Tears" (Sabrina Carpenter) (S)**; 9. **"Why" (Jon Bellion featuring Luke Combs) (S)**; Edgar Barrera; 1. "Birthday Behavior" (Bia and Young Miko) (S); 2. "Coleccionando Heridas" (Karol G and Marco Antonio Solís) (T); 3. "Ese Vato No Te Queda" (Carín León and Gabito Ballesteros) (S); 4. "Me Jalo" (Fuerza Regida and Grupo Frontera) (T); 5. "Me Retiro" (Santana and Grupo Frontera) (S); 6. "Milagros" (Karol G) (S); 7. "Sigueme Besando Así" (Manuel Turizo) (T); 8. "Soltera" (Shakira) (S); 9. "Una Noche Contigo" (Juanes) (S); Jessie Jo Dillon; 1. "Bless Your Heart" (Megan Moroney) (T); 2. "Bottomland" (Hardy) (S); 3. "Dreams Don't Die" (Jelly Roll) (S); 4. "First Rodeo" (Kelsea Ballerini) (T); 5. "Happen to Me" (Russell Dickerson) (S); 6. "Hello S***ty Day" (Jake Worthington and Miranda Lambert) (S); 7. "If You Were Mine" (Morgan Wallen) (T); 8. "Patterns" (Kelsea Ballerini) (T); 9. "To the Men That Love Women After Heartbreak" (Kelsea Ballerini) (T); Tobias Jesso Jr.; 1. "Another Baby!" (Dijon) (T); 2. "Baby!" (Dijon) (T); 3. "Daisies" (Justin Bieber) (T); 4. "From" (Bon Iver) (T); 5. "Go Baby" (Justin Bieber) (T); 6. "Golden Burning Sun" (Miley Cyrus) (T); 7. "Man I Need" (Olivia Dean) (S); 8. "Relationships" (Haim) (S); 9. "Walking Away" (Justin Bieber) (T); Laura Veltz; 1. "About You" (BigXthaPlug featuring Tucker Wetmore) (T); 2. "Blue Strips" (Jessie Murph) (S); 3. "Grand Bouquet" (Maren Morris) (T); 4. "Leave Me Too" (Josh Ross) (S); 5. "Parallel Universe" (Lauren Spencer Smith) (T); 6. "Someone In This Room" (Jessie Murph featuring Bailey Zimmerman) (T); 7. "Touch Me Like a Gangster" (Jessie Murph) (S); 8. "What Tomorrow's For" (Blessing Offor) (T); 9. "You'll Be OK, Kid" (from the Original Documentary Child Star) (Demi Lovato) (S) |

=== Pop & Dance/Electronic ===
Pop & Dance/Electronic Field
| **Best Pop Solo Performance**: **"Messy" – Lola Young**; "Daisies" – Justin Bieber; "Manchild" – Sabrina Carpenter; "Disease" – Lady Gaga; "The Subway" – Chappell Roan | **Best Pop Duo/Group Performance**: **"Defying Gravity" – Cynthia Erivo & Ariana Grande**; "Golden" (from KPop Demon Hunters) – Huntrix: Ejae, Audrey Nuna & Rei Ami; "Gabriela" – Katseye; "APT." – Rosé & Bruno Mars; "30 for 30" – SZA featuring Kendrick Lamar |
| **Best Pop Vocal Album**: **Mayhem – Lady Gaga**; Swag – Justin Bieber; Man's Best Friend – Sabrina Carpenter; Something Beautiful – Miley Cyrus; I've Tried Everything but Therapy (Part 2) – Teddy Swims | **Best Dance/Electronic Album**: **Eusexua – FKA Twigs**; Ten Days – Fred Again..; Fancy That – PinkPantheress; Inhale / Exhale – Rüfüs Du Sol; Fuck U Skrillex You Think Ur Andy Warhol but Ur Not!! <3 – Skrillex |
| **Best Dance Pop Recording**: **"Abracadabra" – Lady Gaga**; **Cirkut, Lady Gaga & Andrew Watt, producers; Serban Ghenea, mixer**; "Bluest Flame" – Selena Gomez and Benny Blanco; Benny Blanco, Dylan Brady & Cashmere Cat, producers; Benny Blanco & Cashmere Cat, mixers; "Midnight Sun" – Zara Larsson; Margo XS & MNEK, producers; Tom Norris, mixer; "Just Keep Watching" (from F1 the Movie) – Tate McRae; Tyler Spry & Ryan Tedder, producers; Manny Marroquin, mixer; "Illegal" – PinkPantheress; Aksel Arvid & PinkPantheress, producers; Nickie Jon Pabón, mixer | **Best Dance/Electronic Recording**: **"End of Summer" – Tame Impala**; **Kevin Parker, producer; Kevin Parker, mixer**; "No Cap" – Disclosure & Anderson .Paak; Disclosure, producer; Guy Lawrence, mixer; "Victory Lap" – Fred Again, Skepta, & PlaqueBoyMax; Blake Cascoe, Berwyn Du Bois, Fred Again, Darcy Lewis, Dan Mayo & PlaqueBoyMax, producers; Tom Norris, mixer; "Space Invader" – Kaytranada; Kaytranada, producer; Kaytranada, mixer; "Voltage" – Skrillex; John Feldmann & Skrillex, producers; Drew Gold, Robert Guzman, Luca Pretolesi, Skrillex & Virtual Riot, mixer |
**Best Remixed Recording, Non-Classical**: **"Abracadabra" (Gesaffelstein Remix) – Gesaffelstein, remixer (Lady Gaga and Gesaffelstein)**; "Don't Forget About Us" – Kaytranada, remixer (Mariah Carey & Kaytranada); "A Dreams a Dream" (Ron Trent Remix) – Ron Trent, remixer (Soul II Soul); "Galvanize" – Chris Lake, remixer (The Chemical Brothers & Chris Lake); "Golden" (David Guetta Remix) – David Guetta, remixer (Huntrix: Ejae, Audrey Nuna and Rei Ami)

=== Rock, Metal & Alternative ===
Rock, Metal & Alternative Field
| **Best Rock Performance**: **"Changes (Live From Villa Park) Back to the Beginning" – Yungblud featuring Nuno Bettencourt, Frank Bello, Adam Wakeman and II of Sleep Token**; "U Should Not Be Doing That" – Amyl and the Sniffers; "The Emptiness Machine" – Linkin Park; "Never Enough" – Turnstile; "Mirtazapine" – Hayley Williams | **Best Metal Performance**: **"Birds" – Turnstile**; "Night Terror" – Dream Theater; "Lachryma" – Ghost; "Emergence" – Sleep Token; "Soft Spine" – Spiritbox |
| **Best Rock Song**: **"As Alive as You Need Me to Be" – Trent Reznor & Atticus Ross, songwriters (Nine Inch Nails)**; "Caramel" – Vessel & II, songwriters (Sleep Token); "Glum" – Daniel James & Hayley Williams, songwriters (Hayley Williams); "Never Enough" – Daniel Fang, Franz Lyons, Pat McCrory, Meg Mills & Brendan Yates, songwriters (Turnstile); "Zombie" – Dominic Harrison & Matt Schwartz, songwriters (Yungblud) | **Best Rock Album**: **Never Enough – Turnstile**; Private Music – Deftones; I Quit – Haim; From Zero – Linkin Park; Idols – Yungblud |
| **Best Alternative Music Performance**: **"Alone" – The Cure**; "Everything Is Peaceful Love" – Bon Iver; "Seein' Stars" – Turnstile; "Mangetout" – Wet Leg; "Parachute" – Hayley Williams | **Best Alternative Music Album**: **Songs of a Lost World – The Cure**; Sable, Fable – Bon Iver; Don't Tap the Glass – Tyler, the Creator; Moisturizer – Wet Leg; Ego Death at a Bachelorette Party – Hayley Williams |

=== R&B, Rap & Spoken Word Poetry ===
R&B, Rap and Spoken Word Poetry Field
| **Best R&B Performance**: **"Folded" – Kehlani**; "Yukon" – Justin Bieber; "It Depends" – Chris Brown featuring Bryson Tiller; "Mutt (Live from NPR's Tiny Desk)" – Leon Thomas; "Heart of a Woman" – Summer Walker | **Best Traditional R&B Performance**: **"Vibes Don't Lie" – Leon Thomas**; "Here We Are" – Durand Bernarr; "Uptown" – Lalah Hathaway; "Love You Too" – Ledisi; "Crybaby" – SZA |
| **Best R&B Song**: **"Folded" – Kehlani Parrish, Andre Harris, Donovan Knight, Miloš Angelov, Khristopher Riddick-Tynes, Darius Scott & Dawit Wilson, songwriters (Kehlani)**; "Heart of a Woman" – Summer Walker & David Bishop, songwriters (Summer Walker); "It Depends" – Chris Brown, Bryson Tiller, Ephrem Lopez Jr., Kristopher Powers, Nicolas Baran, Usher Raymond IV, Jermaine Mauldin, Brian Casey, Manuel Seal, Dewain Whitmore Jr., Ant Clemons, Elliot Trent & Ryan Press, songwriters (Chris Brown featuring Bryson Tiller); "Overqualified" – James Abrahart Jr., Durand Bernarr, John Derisme, Egberto "Budda" Foster, Amaire Johnson, Frank Moka, Cary Singer & Chase Worrell, songwriters (Durand Bernarr); "Yes It Is" – Leon Thomas, Lazaro Andres Camejo, Mike Hector, Alexander Prawl, Rodney Jones Jr., Jariuce Banks, Peter Lee Johnson, songwriters (Leon Thomas) | **Best Progressive R&B Album**: **Bloom – Durand Bernarr**; Adjust Brightness – Bilal; Love On Digital – Destin Conrad; Access All Areas – Flo; Come As You Are – Terrace Martin & Kenyon Dixon |
| **Best R&B Album**: **Mutt – Leon Thomas**; Beloved – Giveon; Why Not More? – Coco Jones; The Crown – Ledisi; Escape Room – Teyana Taylor | **Best Rap Performance**: **"Chains & Whips" – Clipse, Pusha T & Malice featuring Kendrick Lamar & Pharrell Williams**; "Outside" – Cardi B; "Anxiety" – Doechii; "TV Off" – Kendrick Lamar featuring Lefty Gunplay; "Darling, I" – Tyler, the Creator featuring Teezo Touchdown |
| **Best Melodic Rap Performance**: **"Luther" – Kendrick Lamar & SZA**; "Proud of Me" – Fridayy featuring Meek Mill; "Wholeheartedly" – JID featuring Ty Dolla Sign & 6lack; "WeMaj" – Terrace Martin & Kenyon Dixon featuring Rapsody; "Somebody Loves Me" – PartyNextDoor & Drake | **Best Rap Song**: **"TV Off" – Jack Antonoff, Larry Jayy, Kendrick Lamar, Dijon McFarlane, Sean Momberger, Mark Anthony Spears & Kamasi Washington, songwriters (Kendrick Lamar featuring Lefty Gunplay)**; "Anxiety" – Jaylah Hickmon, songwriter (Doechii); "The Birds Don't Sing" – Gene Elliott Thornton Jr., Terrence Thornton, Pharrell Williams & Stevie Wonder, songwriters (Clipse, Pusha T & Malice featuring John Legend & Voices of Fire); "Sticky" – Aaron Bolton, Dwayne Carter Jr., Dudley Alexander Duverne, Tyler Okonma, Janae Wherry, Gloria Woods & Rex Zamor, songwriters (Tyler, the Creator featuring GloRilla, Sexyy Red & Lil Wayne); "TGIF" – Lucas Alegria, Dillon Brophy, Yakki Davis, Jess Jackson, Ronnie Jackson, Mario Mims, Jorge M. Taveras & Gloria Woods, songwriters (GloRilla) |
| **Best Rap Album**: **GNX – Kendrick Lamar**; Let God Sort Em Out – Clipse; Glorious – GloRilla; God Does Like Ugly – JID; Chromakopia – Tyler, the Creator | **Best Spoken Word Poetry Album**: **Words for Days Vol. 1 – Mad Skillz**; A Hurricane in Heels: healed people don't act like that — partially recorded live @City Winery & other places – Queen Sheba; Black Shaman – Marc Marcel; Pages – Omari Hardwick & Anthony Hamilton; Saul Williams Meets Carlos Niño & Friends at Treepeople – Saul Williams, Carlos Niño & Friends |

=== Jazz, Traditional Pop, Contemporary Instrumental & Musical Theater ===
Jazz, Traditional Pop, Contemporary Instrumental & Musical Theater Field
| **Best Jazz Performance**: **"Windows – Live" – Chick Corea, Christian McBride & Brian Blade**; "Noble Rise" – Lakecia Benjamin featuring Immanuel Wilkins & Mark Whitfield; "Peace of Mind / Dreams Come True" – Samara Joy; "Four" – Michael Mayo; "All Stars Lead to You – Live" – Nicole Zuraitis, Dan Pugach, Tom Scott, Idan Morim, Keyon Harrold, Rachel Eckroth & Sam Weber | **Best Jazz Vocal Album**: **Portrait – Samara Joy**; Elemental – Dee Dee Bridgewater & Bill Charlap; We Insist 2025! – Terri Lyne Carrington & Christie Dashiell; Fly – Michael Mayo; Live at Vic's Las Vegas – Nicole Zuraitis, Dan Pugach, Tom Scott, Idan Morim, Keyon Harrold, Rachel Eckroth & Sam Weber |
| **Best Jazz Instrumental Album**: **Southern Nights** – **Sullivan Fortner featuring Peter Washington & Marcus Gilmore**; Trilogy 3 – Live – Chick Corea, Christian McBride & Brian Blade; Belonging – Branford Marsalis Quartet; Spirit Fall – John Patitucci featuring Chris Potter & Brian Blade; Fasten Up – Yellowjackets | **Best Large Jazz Ensemble Album**: **Without Further Ado, Vol 1** – **Christian McBride Big Band**; Orchestrator Emulator – The 8-Bit Big Band; Lumen – Danilo Pérez & Bohuslän Big Band; Basie Rocks – Deborah Silver & The Count Basie Orchestra; Lights on a Satellite – Sun Ra Arkestra; Some Days Are Better: The Lost Scores – Kenny Wheeler Legacy featuring the Royal Academy of Music Jazz Orchestra & Frost Jazz Orchestra |
| **Best Latin Jazz Album**: **A Tribute to Benny Moré and Nat King Cole** – **Gonzalo Rubalcaba, Yainer Horta & Joey Calveiro**; La Fleur de Cayenne – Paquito D'Rivera & Madrid-New York Connection Band; The Original Influencers: Dizzy, Chano & Chico – Arturo O'Farrill & The Afro Latin Jazz Orchestra featuring Pedrito Martinez, Daymé Arocena, Jon Faddis, Donald Harrison & Melvis Santa; Mundoagua – Celebrating Carla Bley – Arturo O'Farrill & The Afro Latin Jazz Orchestra; Vanguardia Subterránea: Live at the Village Vanguard – Miguel Zenón Quartet | **Best Alternative Jazz Album**: **Live-Action** – **Nate Smith**; Honey from a Winter Stone – Ambrose Akinmusire; Keys to the City Volume One – Robert Glasper; Ride into the Sun – Brad Mehldau; Blues Blood – Immanuel Wilkins |
| **Best Traditional Pop Vocal Album**: **A Matter of Time** – **Laufey**; Wintersongs – Laila Biali; The Gift of Love – Jennifer Hudson; Who Believes in Angels? – Elton John & Brandi Carlile; Harlequin – Lady Gaga; The Secret of Life: Partners, Volume 2 – Barbra Streisand | **Best Contemporary Instrumental Album**: **Brightside – Arkai**; Ones & Twos – Gerald Clayton; BeaTrio – Béla Fleck, Edmar Castañeda, Antonio Sánchez; Just Us – Bob James & Dave Koz; Shayan – Charu Suri |
**Best Musical Theater Album**: **Buena Vista Social Club – Marco Paguia, Dean Sharenow & David Yazbek, producers (Original Broadway Cast)**; Death Becomes Her – Taurean Everett, Megan Hilty, Josh Lamon, Christopher Sieber, Jennifer Simard & Michelle Williams, principal vocalists; Noel Carey, Sean Patrick Flahaven, Julia Mattison, Mary-Mitchell Campbell & Scott M. Riesett, producers; Noel Carey & Julia Mattison, composers/lyricists (Original Broadway Cast); Gypsy – Danny Burstein, Kevin Csolak, Audra McDonald, Jordan Tyson & Joy Woods, principal vocalists; David Caddick, Andy Einhorn, David Lai & George C. Wolfe, producers (Jule Styne, composer; Stephen Sondheim, lyricist) (2024 Broadway Cast); Just in Time – Emily Bergl, Jonathan Groff, Erika Henningsen, Gracie Lawrence & Michele Pawk, principal vocalists; Tom Kirdahy, Derik Lee, Andrew Resnick, Bill Sherman & Alex Timbers, producers (Bobby Darin, composer & lyricist) (Original Broadway Cast); Maybe Happy Ending – Marcus Choi, Darren Criss, Dez Duron & Helen J. Shen, principal vocalists; Deborah Abramson, Will Aronson, Ian Kagey & Hue Park, producers; Hue Park, lyricist; Will Aronson, composer & lyricist (Original Broadway Cast)

=== Country & American Roots ===
Country & American Roots Field
| **Best Country Solo Performance**: **"Bad as I Used to Be" (from F1 the Movie) – Chris Stapleton**; "Nose on the Grindstone" – Tyler Childers; "Good News" – Shaboozey; "I Never Lie" – Zach Top; "Somewhere Over Laredo" – Lainey Wilson | **Best Country Duo/Group Performance**: **"Amen" – Shaboozey and Jelly Roll**; "A Song to Sing" – Miranda Lambert and Chris Stapleton; "Trailblazer" – Reba McEntire, Miranda Lambert and Lainey Wilson; "Love Me Like You Used to Do" – Margo Price and Tyler Childers; "Honky Tonk Hall of Fame" – George Strait and Chris Stapleton |
| **Best Contemporary Country Album**: **Beautifully Broken – Jelly Roll**; Patterns – Kelsea Ballerini; Snipe Hunter – Tyler Childers; Evangeline vs. the Machine – Eric Church; Postcards from Texas – Miranda Lambert | **Best Traditional Country Album**: **Ain't in It for My Health – Zach Top**; Dollar a Day – Charley Crockett; American Romance – Lukas Nelson; Oh What a Beautiful World – Willie Nelson; Hard Headed Woman – Margo Price |
| **Best Country Song**: **"Bitin' List" – Tyler Childers, songwriter (Tyler Childers)**; "Good News" – Sean Cook, Collins Obinna Chibueze, Sam Elliot Roman, Michael Ross Pollack, Nevin Sastry & Jacob Torrey, songwriters (Shaboozey); "I Never Lie" – Carson Chamberlain, Tim Nichols & Zach Top, songwriters (Zach Top); "Somewhere Over Laredo" – Andy Albert, Trannie Anderson, Dallas Wilson & Lainey Wilson, songwriters (Lainey Wilson); "A Song to Sing" – Jenee Fleenor, Jesse Frasure, Miranda Lambert & Chris Stapleton, songwriters (Miranda Lambert and Chris Stapleton) | **Best American Roots Song**: **"Ancient Light" – Sarah Jarosz, Aoife O'Donovan & Sara Watkins, songwriters (I'm with Her)**; "Big Money" – Jon Batiste, Mike Elizondo & Steve McEwan, songwriters (Jon Batiste); "Foxes in the Snow" – Jason Isbell, songwriter (Jason Isbell); "Middle" – Jesse Welles, songwriter (Jesse Welles); "Spitfire" – Sierra Hull, songwriter (Sierra Hull) |
| **Best American Roots Performance**: **"Beautiful Strangers" – Mavis Staples**; "Lonely Avenue" – Jon Batiste featuring Randy Newman; "Ancient Light" – I'm with Her; "Crimson and Clay" – Jason Isbell; "Richmond on the James" – Alison Krauss & Union Station | **Best Americana Performance**: **"Godspeed" – Mavis Staples**; "Boom" – Sierra Hull; "Poison in My Well" – Maggie Rose & Grace Potter; "That's Gonna Leave a Mark" – Molly Tuttle; "Horses" – Jesse Welles |
| **Best Americana Album**: **Big Money – Jon Batiste**; Bloom – Larkin Poe; Last Leaf on the Tree – Willie Nelson; So Long Little Miss Sunshine – Molly Tuttle; Middle – Jesse Welles | **Best Bluegrass Album**: **Highway Prayers – Billy Strings**; Carter & Cleveland – Michael Cleveland & Jason Carter; A Tip Toe High Wire – Sierra Hull; Arcadia – Alison Krauss & Union Station; Outrun – The SteelDrivers |
| **Best Traditional Blues Album**: **Ain't Done with the Blues – Buddy Guy**; Room on the Porch – Taj Mahal & Keb' Mo'; One Hour Mama: The Blues of Victoria Spivey – Maria Muldaur; Look Out Highway – Charlie Musselwhite; Young Fashioned Ways – Kenny Wayne Shepherd & Bobby Rush | **Best Contemporary Blues Album**: **Preacher Kids – Robert Randolph**; Breakthrough – Joe Bonamassa; Paper Doll – Samantha Fish; A Tribute to LJK – Eric Gales; Family – Southern Avenue |
| **Best Folk Album**: **Wild and Clear and Blue – I'm With Her**; What Did the Blackbird Say to the Crow – Rhiannon Giddens & Justin Robinson; Crown of Roses – Patty Griffin; Foxes in the Snow – Jason Isbell; Under the Powerlines April 24 – September 24 – Jesse Welles | **Best Regional Roots Music Album**: **A Tribute to the King of Zydeco – Various Artists**; Live at Vaughan's – Corey Henry & The Treme Funktet; For Fat Man – Preservation Brass & Preservation Hall Jazz Band; Church of New Orleans – Kyle Roussel; Second Line Sunday – Trombone Shorty and New Breed Brass Band |

=== Gospel & Contemporary Christian ===
Gospel & Contemporary Christian Field
| **Best Gospel Performance/Song**: **"Come Jesus Come" – CeCe Winans featuring Shirley Caesar**; "Do It Again" – Kirk Franklin; Kirk Franklin, songwriter; "Church" – Tasha Cobbs Leonard and John Legend; Anthony S. Brown, Brunes Charles, Annatoria Chitapa, Kenneth Leonard Jr., Tasha Cobbs Leonard & Jonas Myrin, songwriters; "Still Live" – Jonathan McReynolds & Jamal Roberts; Britney Delagraentiss, Jonathan McReynolds, David Lamar Outing II, Orlando Joel Palmer & Terrell Demetrius Wilson, songwriters; "Amen" – Pastor Mike Jr.; Adia Andrews, Michael McClure Jr., David Lamar Outing II & Terrell Anthony Pettus, songwriters | **Best Contemporary Christian Music Performance/Song**: **"Hard Fought Hallelujah" – Brandon Lake with Jelly Roll**; **Chris Brown, Jason Bradley Deford, Steven Furtick, Benjamin William Hastings & Brandon Lake, songwriters**; "I Know a Name" – Elevation Worship, Chris Brown, Brandon Lake; Hank Bentley, Steven Furtick, Brandon Lake & Jacob Sooter, songwriters; "Your Way's Better" – Forrest Frank; Forrest Frank & Pera, songwriters; "Headphones" – Lecrae, Killer Mike and T.I.; BongoByTheWay, Clifford Harris, Lecrae Moore, Michael Render & Tyshane Thompson, songwriters; "Amazing" – Darrel Walls and PJ Morton; PJ Morton & Darrel Walls, songwriters |
| **Best Gospel Album**: **Heart of Mine – Darrel Walls and PJ Morton**; Sunny Days – Yolanda Adams; Tasha – Tasha Cobbs Leonard; Live Breathe Fight – Tamela Mann; Only On the Road Live – Tye Tribbett | **Best Contemporary Christian Music Album**: **Coritos Vol. 1 – Israel & New Breed**; Child of God II – Forrest Frank; King of Hearts – Brandon Lake; Reconstruction – Lecrae; Let the Church Sing – Tauren Wells |
**Best Roots Gospel Album**: **I Will Not Be Moved — Live – The Brooklyn Tabernacle Choir**; Then Came the Morning – Gaither Vocal Band; Praise & Worship: More Than a Hollow Hallelujah – The Isaacs; Good Answers – Karen Peck and New River; Back to My Roots – Candi Staton

=== Latin, Global, African, Reggae & New Age, Ambient or Chant ===
Latin, Global, African, Reggae & New Age, Ambient or Chant Field
| **Best Latin Pop Album**: **Cancionera – Natalia Lafourcade**; Cosa Nuestra – Rauw Alejandro; Bogotá (Deluxe) – Andrés Cepeda; Tropicoqueta – Karol G; ¿Y Ahora Qué? – Alejandro Sanz | **Best Música Urbana Album**: **Debí Tirar Más Fotos – Bad Bunny**; Mixteip – J Balvin; Ferxxo Vol X: Sagrado – Feid; Naiki – Nicki Nicole; EUB Deluxe – Trueno; Sinfónico — En Vivo – Yandel |
| **Best Latin Rock or Alternative Album**: **Papota – Ca7riel & Paco Amoroso**; Genes Rebeldes – Aterciopelados; Astropical – Bomba Estéreo and Rawayana (Astropical); Algorhythm – Los Wizzards; Novela – Fito Paez | **Best Música Mexicana Album (including Tejano)**: **Palabra de To's (Seca) – Carín León**; Mala Mía – Fuerza Regida and Grupo Frontera; Y Lo Que Viene – Grupo Frontera; Sin Rodeos – Paola Jara; Bobby Pulido & Friends una Tuya y una Mía - Por la Puerta Grande (En Vivo) – Bobby Pulido |
| **Best Tropical Latin Album**: **Raíces – Gloria Estefan**; Fotografías – Rubén Blades and Roberto Delgado & Orquesta; Clásicos 1.0 – Grupo Niche; Bingo – Alain Pérez; Debut y Segunda Tanda, Vol. 2 – Gilberto Santa Rosa | **Best Reggae Album**: **Blxxd & Fyah** – **Keznamdi**; Treasure Self Love – Lila Iké; Heart & Soul – Vybz Kartel; From Within – Mortimer; No Place Like Home – Jesse Royal |
| **Best Global Music Performance**: **"Eoo"** – **Bad Bunny**; "Cantando en el Camino" – Ciro Hurtado; "Jerusalema" – Angélique Kidjo; "Inmigrante y Que?" – Yeisy Rojas; "Shrini's Dream (Live)" – Shakti; "Daybreak" – Anoushka Shankar featuring Alam Khan & Sarathy Korwar | **Best Global Music Album**: **Caetano e Bethânia Ao Vivo – Caetano Veloso and Maria Bethânia**; Sounds of Kumbha – Siddhant Bhatia; No Sign of Weakness – Burna Boy; Eclairer le monde - Light the World – Youssou N'Dour; Mind Explosion (50th Anniversary Tour Live) – Shakti; Chapter III: We Return to Light – Anoushka Shankar featuring Alam Khan & Sarathy Korwar |
| **Best African Music Performance**: **"Push 2 Start" – Tyla**; "Love" – Burna Boy; "With You" – Davido featuring Omah Lay; "Hope & Love" – Eddy Kenzo & Mehran Matin; "Gimme Dat" – Ayra Starr featuring Wizkid | **Best New Age, Ambient or Chant Album**: **Nomadica** – **Carla Patullo featuring The Scorchio Quartet & Tonality**; Kuruvinda – Kirsten Agresta-Copely; According to the Moon – Cheryl B. Engelhardt, GEM, Dallas String Quartet; Into the Forest – Jahnavi Harrison; The Colors in My Mind – Chris Redding |

=== Children's, Comedy, Audio Book Narration & Storytelling, Visual Media & Music Video/Film ===
Children's, Comedy, Audio Book Narration & Storytelling, Visual Media & Music Video/Film Field
| **Best Children's Music Album**: **Harmony − Fyütch & Aura V**; Ageless: 100 Years Young − Joanie Leeds & Joya; Buddy's Magic Tree House − Mega Ran; Herstory − Flor Bromley; The Music of Tori and the Muses − Tori Amos | **Best Comedy Album**: **Your Friend, Nate Bargatze − Nate Bargatze**; Drop Dead Years − Bill Burr; PostMortem − Sarah Silverman; Single Lady − Ali Wong; What Had Happened Was... − Jamie Foxx |
| **Best Audio Book, Narration & Storytelling Recording**: **Meditations: Reflections of His Holiness the Dalai Lama** **− Tenzin Gyatso, the Dalai Lama**; Elvis, Rocky & Me: The Carol Connors Story − Kathy Garver; Into the Uncut Grass − Trevor Noah; Lovely One: A Memoir − Ketanji Brown Jackson; You Know It's True: The Real Story of Milli Vanilli − Fab Morvan | **Best Compilation Soundtrack for Visual Media**: **Sinners – Various Artists; Ryan Coogler, Ludwig Göransson & Serena Göransson, compilation producers; Nikki Sherod, music supervisor**; A Complete Unknown – Timothée Chalamet, artist; Nick Baxter, Steven Gizicki & James Mangold, compilation producers; Steven Gizicki, music supervisor; F1 the Album – Various Artists; Brandon Davis, Joe Khoury & Kevin Weaver, compilation producers; David Taylor & Jake Voulgarides, music supervisors; KPop Demon Hunters – Various Artists; Spring Aspers & Dana Sano, compilation producers; Ian Eisendrath, music supervisor; Wicked – Cynthia Erivo, Ariana Grande & Wicked Movie Cast, artists; Stephen Oremus, Stephen Schwartz, & Greg Wells, compilation producers; Maggie Rodford, music supervisor |
| **Best Score Soundtrack Album for Visual Media**: **Sinners – Ludwig Göransson**; How to Train Your Dragon – John Powell; Severance: Season 2 – Theodore Shapiro; Wicked – John Powell & Stephen Schwartz; The Wild Robot – Kris Bowers | **Best Score Soundtrack for Video Games and Other Interactive Media**: **Sword of the Sea – Austin Wintory**; Avatar: Frontiers of Pandora – Secrets of the Spires – Pinar Toprak; Helldivers 2 – Wilbert Roget II; Indiana Jones and the Great Circle – Gordy Haab; Star Wars Outlaws: Wild Card & A Pirate's Fortune – Cody Matthew Johnson & Wilbert Roget II |
**Best Song Written for Visual Media**: **"Golden" (from KPop Demon Hunters)**; **Ejae, Teddy Park, Joong Gyu Kwak, Yu Han Lee, Hee Dong Nam, Jeong Hoon Seo & Mark Sonnenblick, songwriters (Huntrix: Ejae, Audrey Nuna, Rei Ami)**; "As Alive as You Need Me to Be" (from Tron: Ares); Trent Reznor & Atticus Ross, songwriters (Nine Inch Nails); "I Lied to You" (from Sinners); Ludwig Göransson & Raphael Saadiq, songwriters (Miles Caton); "Never Too Late" (from Elton John: Never Too Late); Brandi Carlile, Elton John, Bernie Taupin & Andrew Watt, songwriters (Elton John & Brandi Carlile); "Pale, Pale Moon" (from Sinners); Ludwig Göransson & Brittany Howard, songwriters (Jayme Lawson); "Sinners" (from Sinners); Leonard Denisenko, Rodarius Green, Travis Harrington, Tarkan Kozluklu, Kyris Mingo & Darius Povilinus, songwriters (Rod Wave)
| **Best Music Video**: **"Anxiety" – Doechii**; James Mackel, video director; Pablo Feldman, Jolene Mendes & Sophia Sabella, video producers; "Manchild" – Sabrina Carpenter; Vania Heymann & Gal Muggia, video directors; Aiden Magarian, Nathan Scherrer & Natan Schottenfels, video producers; "So Be It" – Clipse; Hannan Hussain, video director; Theresa Kusumadjaja, video producer; "Love" – OK Go; Aaron Duffy, Miguel Espada & Damian Kulash Jr., video directors; Petra Ahmann & Andrew Geller, video producer; "Young Lion" – Sade; Sophie Muller, video director; Aaron Taylor Dean & Sade, video producers | **Best Music Film**: **Music by John Williams – John Williams**; **Laurent Bouzereau, video director; Sara Bernstein, Laurent Bouzereau, Justin Falvey, Darryl Frank, Brian Grazer, Ron Howard, Meredith Kaulfers, Kathleen Kennedy, Frank Marshall, Steven Spielberg & Justin Wilkes, video producers**; Devo – Devo; Chris Smith, video director; Danny Gabai, Anita Greenspan, Chris Holmes & Chris Smith, video producers; Live at the Royal Albert Hall – Raye; Paul Dugdale, video director; Stefan Demetriou & Amy James, video producers; Relentless – Diane Warren; Bess Kargman, video director; Peggy Drexler, Michele Farinola & Kat Nguyen, video producers; Piece by Piece – Pharrell Williams; Morgan Neville, video director; Morgan Neville, Caitrin Rogers, Mimi Valdes & Pharrell Williams, video producers |

=== Package, Notes & Historical ===
Package, Notes & Historical Field
| **Best Historical Album**: **Joni Mitchell Archives – Vol. 4: The Asylum Years (1976–1980)**; **Patrick Milligan & Joni Mitchell, compilation producers; Bernie Grundman, mastering engineer (Joni Mitchell)**; The Making of Five Leaves Left; Joe Black, Cally Callomon & Johnny Chandler, compilation producers; Richard Whittaker, restoration engineer; Simon Heyworth & John Wood, mastering engineers (Nick Drake); Roots Rocking Zimbabwe: The Modern Sound of Harare Townships 1975–1980 (Analog Africa No. 41); Samy Ben Redjeb, compilation producer; Michael Graves, mastering engineer (Various Artists); Super Disco Pirata: De Tepito Para El Mundo 1965–1980 (Analog Africa No. 39); Samy Ben Redjeb, compilation producer; Michael Graves, mastering engineer (Various Artists); You Can't Hip a Square: The Doc Pomus Songwriting Demos; Will Bratton, Sharyn Felder & Cheryl Pawelski, compilation producers; Michael Graves, mastering engineer (Doc Pomus) | **Best Recording Package**: **Tracks II: The Lost Albums**; **Meghan Foley & Michelle Holme, art directors (Bruce Springsteen)**; And the Adjacent Possible; Hà Trịnh Quốc Bảo, Damian Kulash, Claudio Ripol, Wombi Rose & Yuri Suzuki, art directors (OK Go); Balloonerism; Bráulio Amado & Alim Smith, art directors (Mac Miller); Danse Macabre: De Luxe; Rory McCartney, art director (Duran Duran); Loud Is As; Farbod Karkobi & Emily Sneddon, art directors (Tsunami); Sequoia; Tim Breen & Ken Shipley, art directors (Various Artists); The Spins (Picture Disc Vinyl); Darby Kaighin-Shields & Miller McCormick, art director (Mac Miller) |
| **Best Album Cover**: **Chromakopia**; **Tyler Okonma, art director (Tyler, the Creator)**; Debí Tirar Más Fotos; Benito Antonio Martinez Ocasio, art director (Bad Bunny); The Crux; Jake Hirshland, Joe Keery, Neil Krug, Taylor Vandergift & William Wesley II, art directors (Djo); Glory; Cody Critcheloe, Mike Hadreas & Andrew J.S., art directors (Perfume Genius); Moisturizer; Iris Luz, Lava La Rue & Rhian Teasdale, art directors (Wet Leg) | **Best Album Notes**: **Miles 55: The Prestige Recordings**; **Ashley Kahn, notes writer (Miles Davis)**; Adios, Farewell, Goodbye, Good Luck, So Long: On Stage 1964-1974; Scott B. Bomar, notes writer (Buck Owens and His Buckaroos); After the Last Sky; Adam Shatz, notes writer (Anouar Brahem, Anja Lechner, Django Bates, Dave Holland); Árabe; Amanda Ekery, notes writer (Amanda Ekery); The First Family: Live at Winchester Cathedral 1967; Alec Palao, notes writer (Sly & the Family Stone); A Ghost is Born (20th Anniversary Deluxe Edition); Bob Mehr, notes writer (Wilco) |

=== Production, Engineering, Composition & Arrangement ===
Production, Engineering, Composition & Arrangement Field
| **Producer of the Year, Classical**: **Elaine Martone**; 1. Berlioz: Symphonie Fantastique (Franz Welser-Möst & The Cleveland Orchestra) (A); 2. Chopin & Rachmaninoff: Cello Sonatas (Brian Thornton & Spencer Myer) (A); 3. Dear Mrs. Kennedy (Ryan Townsend Strand) (A); 4. Eastman: Symphony No. 2; Tchaikovsky: Symphony No. 2 (Franz Welser-Möst & The Cleveland Orchestra) (A); 5. LeFrak: Romántico (Sharon Isbin, Enrico Lopez-Yañez & Orchestra of St. Luke's) (A); 6. Mozart: Piano Concerto No. 27 & Symphony No. 29 (Garrick Ohlsson, Franz Welser-Möst & The Cleveland Orchestra) (A); 7. The Poet & The Prodigy (Debra Nagy & Mark Edwards) (A); 8. Shapes in Collective Space (Tallā Rouge) (A); 9. Songs of Orpheus (Kelley O'Connor) (A); Blanton Alspaugh; 1. All Is Miracle - The Choral Music of Kyle Pederson (Timothy J. Campbell & Transept) (A); 2. Heggie: Intelligence (Kwamé Ryan, Janai Brugger, Jamie Barton, J'Nai Bridges & Houston Grand Opera) (A); 3. Marsalis: Blues Symphony (Jader Bignamini & Detroit Symphony Orchestra) (A); 4. Massenet: Werther (Robert Spano, Matthew Polenzani, Isabel Leonard & Houston Grand Opera) (A); 5. The Mirage Calls (Charles Bruffy & Kansas City Chorale) (A); 6. Sheehan: Ukrainian War Requiem (Michael Zaugg, Axios, Men's Ensemble & Pro Coro Canada) (A); 7. Sun, Moon, Stars, Rain (Christopher Gabbitas & Phoenix Chorale) (A); Sergei Kvitko; 1. Biedenbender: Enigma; River of Time (Kevin L. Sedatole & Michigan State University Wind Symphony) (A); 2. Chiaroscuro (Vedrana Subotic) (A); 3. Dancing in a Still Life (Tasha Warren) (A); 4. Excursions (Vuorovesi Trio) (A); 5. Four Hands. Two Hearts. One Hope. Ukrainian and American Music for Piano Duo (Mykhailo Diordiiev & Anastasiia Larchikova) (A); 6. Here and Now - Trumpet Music by Virginia Composers (Jason Crafton, Richard Masters, Annie Stevens & Paul Langosch) (A); 7. Lansky: Touch and Go (Gwendolyn Dease) (A); 8. Orbiting Garden (William Hobbs) (A); 9. Would That Loving Were Enough (Haven Trio) (A); Morten Lindberg; 1. Fred Over Jorden (Peace to the World) (Elisabeth Holte, Kjetil Bjerkestrand & Uranienborg Vokalensemble) (A); 2. Stjernebru (Anne Karin Sundal-Ask & Det Norske Jentekor) (A); 3. Yule (Trio Mediæval) (A); Dmitriy Lipay; 1. Heggie: Before It All Goes Dark (Joseph Mechavich, Megan Marino, Ryan McKinny & Music of Remembrance Ensemble) (A); 2. Odyssey (Jorge Glem, Gustavo Dudamel & Simón Bolívar Symphony Orchestra of Venezuela) (A); 3. Ortiz: Yanga (Gustavo Dudamel, Alisa Weilerstein & Los Angeles Philharmonic) (A) | **Best Immersive Audio Album**: **Immersed**; **Justin Gray, immersive mix engineer; Michael Romanowski, immersive mastering engineer; Justin Gray, Drew Jurecka & Morten Lindberg, immersive producers (Justin Gray)**; All American Fuckboy; Andrew Law, immersive mix engineer (Duckwrth); An Immersive Tribute to Astor Piazzolla (Live); Andrés Mayo & Martín Muscatello, immersive mix engineers; Andrés Mayo & Martín Muscatello, immersive producers (Various Artists); Tearjerkers; Hans-Martin Buff, immersive mix engineer; Hans-Martin Buff, immersive producer (Tearjerkers); Yule; Morten Lindberg, immersive mix engineer; Morten Lindberg, immersive mastering engineer; Arve Henriksen & Morten Lindberg, immersive producers (Trio Mediæval) |
**Best Instrumental Composition**: **"First Snow"**; **Remy Le Boeuf, composer (Nordkraft Big Band, Remy Le Boeuf & Danielle Wertz)**; "Live Life This Day: Movement I"; Miho Hazama, composer (Miho Hazama, Danish Radio Big Band & Danish National Symphony Orchestra); "Lord, That's a Long Way"; Sierra Hull, composer (Sierra Hull); "Opening"; Zain Effendi, composer (Zain Effendi); "Train to Emerald City"; John Powell & Stephen Schwartz, composers (John Powell & Stephen Schwartz); "Why You Here / Before the Sun Went Down"; Ludwig Göransson, composer (Ludwig Göransson featuring Miles Caton)
| **Best Engineered Album, Classical**: **Cerrone: Don't Look Down**; **Mike Tierney, engineer; Alan Silverman, mastering engineer (Sandbox Percussion)**; Eastman: Symphony No. 2; Tchaikovsky: Symphony No. 2; Gintas Norvila, engineer; Jennifer Nulsen, mastering engineer (Franz Welser-Möst & The Cleveland Orchestra); Shostakovich: Lady Macbeth Of The Mtsensk District; Shawn Murphy & Nick Squire, engineers; Tim Martyn, mastering engineer (Andris Nelsons, Kristine Opolais, Günther Groissböck, Peter Hoare, Brenden Gunnell & Boston Symphony Orchestra); Standard Stoppages; Sean Connors, Robert Dillon, Peter Martin, Bill Maylone, Judith Sherman & David Skidmore, engineers; Joe Lambert, mastering engineer (Third Coast Percussion); Yule; Morten Lindberg, engineer; Morten Lindberg, mastering engineer (Trio Mediæval) | **Best Engineered Album, Non-Classical**: **That Wasn't a Dream**; **Joseph Lorge & Blake Mills, engineers; Patricia Sullivan, mastering engineer (Pino Palladino & Blake Mills)**; All Things Light; Jesse Brock, Jon Castelli, Matt Chamberlain, Tyler Johnson, Nick Lobel, Simon Maartensson, Lawrence "Boo" Mitchell, Rob Moose, Anders Mouridsen, Ryan Nasci, Ernesto Olivera-Lapier, Ethan Schneiderman, Rahm Silverglade & Owen Stoutt, engineers; Dale Becker, mastering engineer (Cam); Arcadia; Neal Cappellino & Gary Paczosa, engineers; Brad Blackwood, mastering engineer (Alison Krauss & Union Station); For Melancholy Brunettes (& Sad Women); Joseph Lorge, Blake Mills & Sebastian Reunert, engineers; Patricia Sullivan, mastering engineer (Japanese Breakfast) |
| **Best Arrangement, Instrumental or A Cappella**: **"Super Mario Praise Break"**; **Bryan Carter, Charlie Rosen & Matthew Whitaker, arrangers (The 8-Bit Big Band)**; "Be Okay"; Cynthia Erivo, arranger (Cynthia Erivo); "A Child Is Born"; Remy Le Boeuf, arranger (Nordkraft Big Band & Remy Le Boeuf); "Fight On"; Andy Clausen, Addison Maye-Saxon, Riley Mulherkar & Chloe Rowlands, arrangers (The Westerlies) | **Best Arrangement, Instrumental and Vocals**: **"Big Fish"**; **Erin Bentlage, Sara Gazarek, Johnaye Kendrick, Nate Smith & Amanda Taylor, arrangers (Nate Smith featuring säje)**; "How Did She Look?"; Nelson Riddle, arranger (Seth MacFarlane); "Keep an Eye on Summer"; Jacob Collier, arranger (Jacob Collier); "Something in the Water (Acoustic-Ish)"; Clyde Lawrence, Gracie Lawrence & Linus Lawrence, arrangers (Lawrence); "What a Wonderful World"; Cody Fry, arranger (Cody Fry) |

=== Classical ===
Classical Field
| **Best Orchestral Performance**: **Messiaen: Turangalîla-Symphonie**; **Andris Nelsons conductor (Boston Symphony Orchestra)**; Coleridge-Taylor: Toussaint L'Ouverture, Ballade Op. 4, Suites from '24 Negro Melodies; Michael Repper, conductor (National Philharmonic); Ravel: Boléro, M. 81; Gustavo Dudamel, conductor (Simón Bolívar Symphony Orchestra of Venezuela); Still & Bonds; Yannick Nézet-Séguin, conductor (The Philadelphia Orchestra); Stravinsky: Symphony in Three Movements; Esa-Pekka Salonen, conductor (San Francisco Symphony) | **Best Opera Recording**: **Heggie: Intelligence**; **Kwamé Ryan, conductor; Jamie Barton, J'Nai Bridges & Janai Brugger; Blanton Alspaugh, producer (Houston Grand Opera; Gene Scheer)**; Huang Ruo: An American Soldier; Carolyn Kuan, conductor; Hannah Cho, Alex DeSocio, Nina Yoshida Nelsen & Brian Vu; Adam Abeshouse, Silas Brown & Doron Schachter, producers (American Composers Orchestra; David Henry Hwang); Kouyoumdjian: Adoration; Alan Pierson, conductor; Miriam Khalil, Marc Kudisch, David Adam Moore, Omar Najmi, Naomi Louisa O'Connell & Karim Sulayman; Mary Kouyoumdjian, producer (Silvana Quartet; The Choir of Trinity Wall Street); O'Halloran: Trade & Mary Motorhead; Elaine Kelly, conductor; Oisín Ó Dálaigh & John Molloy; Alex Dowling & Emma O'Halloran, producers (Irish National Opera Orchestra; Mark O'Halloran); Tesori: Grounded; Yannick Nézet-Séguin, conductor; Ben Bliss, Emily D'Angelo, Greer Grimsley & Kyle Miller; David Frost, producer (The Metropolitan Opera Orchestra; The Metropolitan Opera Chorus; George Brant) |
| **Best Choral Performance**: **Ortiz: Yanga**; **Gustavo Dudamel, conductor; Grant Gershon, chorus master (Los Angeles Philharmonic; Los Angeles Master Chorale)**; Advena – Liturgies for a Broken World; Craig Hella Johnson, conductor (Simon Barrad, Emily Yocum Black & Michael Hawes; Conspirare); Childs: In the Arms of the Beloved; Grant Gershon, conductor (Billy Childs, Dan Chmielinski, Christian Euman, Larry Koonse, Lyris Quartet, Anne Akiko Meyers, Carol Robbins & Luciana Souza; Los Angeles Master Chorale); Lang: Poor Hymnal; Donald Nally, conductor (Steven Bradshaw, Michael Hawes, Lauren Kelly, Rebecca Siler & Elisa Sutherland; The Crossing); Requiem of Light; Steven Fox, conductor; Emily Drennan & Patti Drennan, chorus masters (Brian Giebler & Sangeeta Kaur; The Clarion Choir) | **Best Chamber Music/Small Ensemble Performance**: **Dennehy: Land of Winter – Alan Pierson & Alarm Will Sound**; La Mer – French Piano Trios – Neave Trio; Lullabies for the Brokenhearted – Lili Haydn & Paul Cantelon; Slavic Sessions – Mak Grgić and Mateusz Kowalski; Standard Stoppages – Third Coast Percussion |
| **Best Classical Instrumental Solo**: **Shostakovich: The Cello Concertos – Yo-Yo Ma; Andris Nelsons, conductor (Boston Symphony Orchestra)**; Coleridge-Taylor: 3 Selections from '24 Negro Melodies' – Curtis Stewart; Michael Repper, conductor (National Philharmonic); Hope Orchestrated – Mary Dawood Catlin; Jesús David Medina & Raniero Palm, conductors (Venezuela Strings Recording Ensemble); Inheritances – Adam Tendler; Price: Piano Concerto in One Movement in D Minor – Han Chen; John Jeter, conductor (Malmö Opera Orchestra); Shostakovich: The Piano Concertos; Solo Works – Yuja Wang; Andris Nelsons, conductor (Boston Symphony Orchestra) | **Best Classical Vocal Solo**: **Telemann: Ino – Opera Arias for Soprano**; **Amanda Forsythe, soloist; Robert Mealy, Paul O'Dette & Stephen Stubbs, conductors (Boston Early Music Festival Orchestra)**; Alike – My Mother's Dream; Allison Charney, soloist; Benjamin Loeb, conductor (National Symphonia Orchestra); Black Pierrot; Sidney Outlaw, soloist; Warren Jones, pianist; In This Short Life; Devony Smith, soloist; Danny Zelibor, pianist; Michael Nicolas, artist; Kurtág: Kafka Fragments; Susan Narucki, soloist; Curtis Macomber, artist; Schubert Beatles; Theo Hoffman, soloist; Steven Blier, pianist (Rupert Boyd, Julia Bullock, Alex Levine, Andrew Owens, Rubén Rengel & Sam Weber) |
| **Best Classical Compendium**: **Ortiz: Yanga**; **Gustavo Dudamel, conductor; Dmitriy Lipay, producer**; Cerrone: Don't Look Down; Sandbox Percussion; Jonathan Allen, Victor Caccese, Christopher Cerrone, Ian Rosenbaum, Terry Sweeney & Mike Tierney, producers; The Dunbar/Moore Sessions, Vol. II; Will Liverman; Jonathan Estabrooks, producer; Seven Seasons; Janai Brugger, Isolde Fair, MB Gordy & Starr Parodi; Nicholas Dodd, conductor; Jeff Fair, Starr Parodi & Kitt Wakeley, producers; Tombeaux; Christina Sandsengen; Shaun Drew & Christina Sandsengen, producers | **Best Contemporary Classical Composition**: **Ortiz: Dzonot**; **Gabriela Ortiz, composer (Alisa Weilerstein, Gustavo Dudamel & Los Angeles Philharmonic)**; Cerrone: Don't Look Down; Christopher Cerrone, composer (Conor Hanick & Sandbox Percussion); Dennehy: Land of Winter; Donnacha Dennehy, composer (Alan Pierson & Alarm Will Sound); León: Raíces – Origins; Tania León, composer (Edward Gardner & London Philharmonic Orchestra); Okpebholo: Songs in Flight; Shawn E. Okpebholo, composer (Will Liverman, Paul Sánchez & Various Artists) |

== Special Merit Awards ==
=== MusiCares Person of the Year ===
MusiCares Person of the Year is a charity award celebrating an artist's creative achievements and their dedication to philanthropy.

- Mariah Carey

=== Dr. Dre Global Impact Award ===
- Pharrell Williams

=== Black Music Icon Award ===
- Brandy
- Kirk Franklin

=== Lifetime Achievement Award ===
- Carlos Santana
- Chaka Khan
- Cher
- Fela Kuti (posthumous)
- Paul Simon
- Whitney Houston (posthumous)

=== Trustees Award ===
- Bernie Taupin
- Eddie Palmieri (posthumous)
- Sylvia Rhone

=== Technical Grammy Award ===
- John Chowning

=== Harry Belafonte Best Song for Social Change Award ===
- "Ice Cream Man", written by Rachel Keen, Michael Tucker and Mike Sabath, performed by Raye

== Multiple nominations ==
The following received multiple nominations:

9 nominations

- Kendrick Lamar

7 nominations

- Jack Antonoff
- Cirkut
- Lady Gaga

6 nominations

- Bad Bunny
- Leon Thomas
- Sabrina Carpenter
- Serban Ghenea
- Tyler, the Creator

5 nominations

- Andrew Watt
- Clipse
- Doechii
- Ludwig Göransson
- Sounwave
- SZA
- Turnstile

4 nominations

- Amy Allen
- Justin Bieber
- Bryce Bordone
- Tyler Childers
- Oli Jacobs
- Sierra Hull
- Miranda Lambert
- Morten Lindberg
- Andris Nelsons
- Ruairi O'Flaherty
- Laura Sisk
- Chris Stapleton
- Jesse Welles
- Hayley Williams
- Pharrell Williams

3 nominations

- Jon Batiste
- Dale Becker
- Durand Bernarr
- Scott Bridgeway
- Jozef Caldwell
- Gustavo Dudamel
- Ejae
- Cynthia Erivo
- GloRilla
- I'm With Her
- Jason Isbell
- Jelly Roll
- Brandon Lake
- Jack Manning
- Christian McBride
- Bruno Mars
- Blake Mills
- Randy Merrill
- John Powell
- Rosé
- Shaboozey
- Zach Top
- Vessel2
- Kamasi Washington
- Wet Leg
- Lainey Wilson
- Yungblud

== Multiple wins ==
=== 5 wins ===
- Kendrick Lamar

=== 3 wins ===
- Bad Bunny
- Jelly Roll
- Cirkut

=== 2 wins ===
- Jack Antonoff
- The Cure
- Gustavo Dudamel
- Lady Gaga
- Ludwig Göransson
- I'm with Her
- Kehlani
- Christian McBride
- Andris Nelsons
- Nate Smith
- Mavis Staples
- SZA
- Leon Thomas
- Turnstile
