= Mark Edwards =

Marc or Mark Edwards may refer to:

== Arts and entertainment ==
- Mark Edwards (actor) (born 1942), Australian actor
- Mark Edwards (British writer) (born 1970), British fiction writer
- Marc Edwards (drummer) (born 1949), American jazz drummer
- Mark Edwards (harpsichordist) (born 1986), Canadian
- Marc Edwards (Home and Away), fictional character on the Australian soap opera Home and Away

== Sports ==
- Marc Edwards (American football) (born 1974), American football player
- Mark Edwards (boxer) (born 1963), British boxer
- Mark Edwards (skier), New Zealand Paralympian

== Others ==
- Mark Edwards (British businessman), British CEO of MDS
- Mark Edwards (boatbuilder) (born 1954), English traditional boatbuilder
- Mark Edwards (bishop) (born 1959), Australian Roman Catholic prelate
- Marc Edwards (professor) (born 1964), professor of civil and environmental engineering
- Mark Edwards (theologian)

== See also ==
- Mark Edward (1951–2024), American psychic entertainer and mentalist
