= Grounded (opera) =

2023 opera by Jeanine Tesori

- Opera by Jeanine Tesori
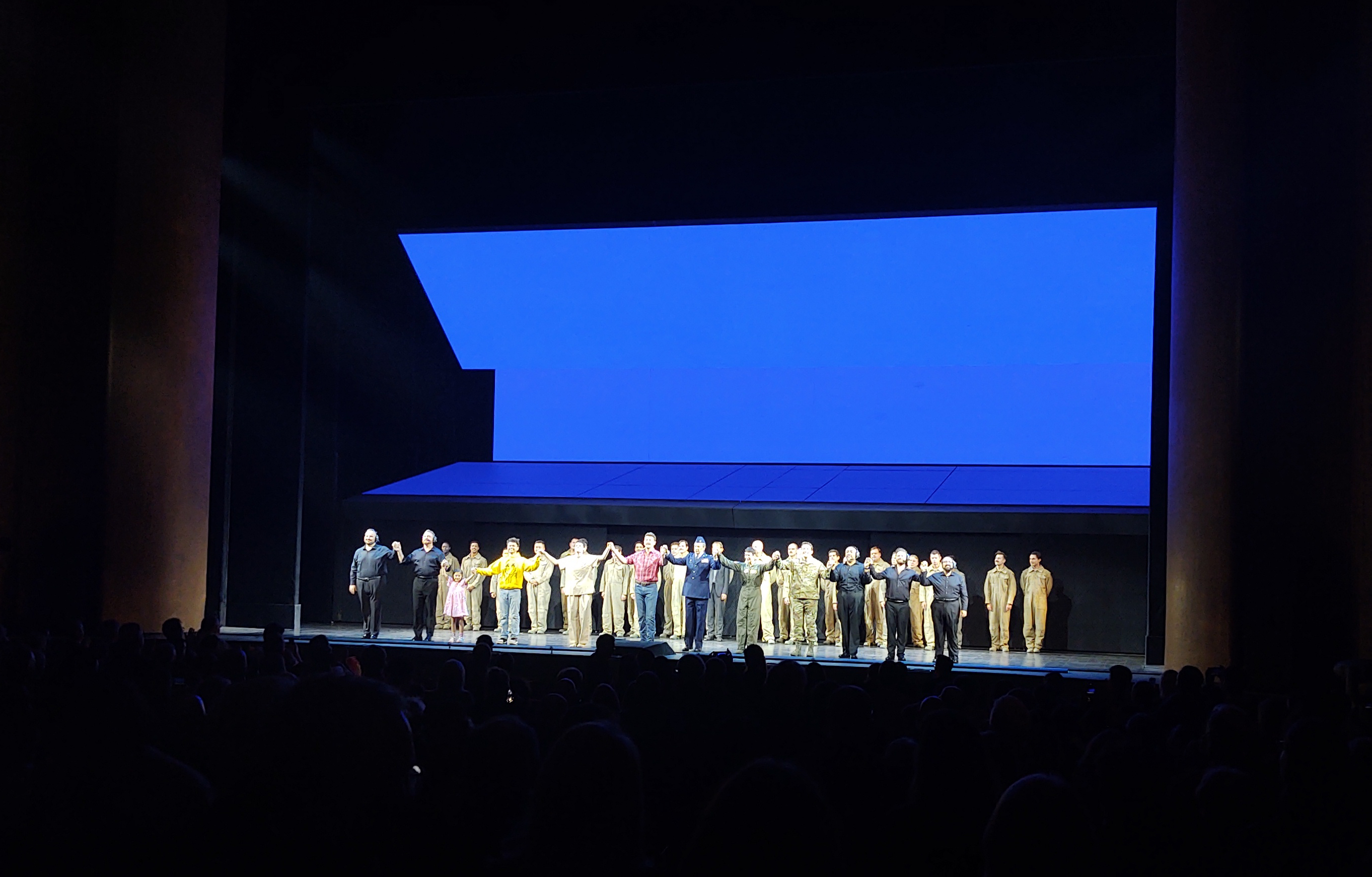
- Cast of Grounded taking a bow at the Metropolitan Opera House, 2024
- Librettist: George Brant
- Language: English
- Based on: Grounded (a play by George Brant)
- Premiere: October 28, 2023; Kennedy Center, Washington, D.C

Grounded is an English-language opera in two acts with music by Jeanine Tesori and libretto by George Brant. The libretto is adapted from Brant's play of the same name. The opera features a pilot, Jess, and shows her struggle to adapt to drone warfare. The opera premiered at the Kennedy Center in 2023 to mixed reviews. Emily D'Angelo was praised for her role as the lead character, and Tesori's score was generally well received. The way in which the opera dealt with the theme of drone warfare was generally criticized by reviewers, who suggested it did not have a clear anti-war theme.

A second production with a shorter runtime followed in 2024 at the Metropolitan Opera and met mixed-to-negative critical reception. Critics were unanimous in praising D'Angelo, but found the array of minor characters distracted from the drama. There were mixed opinions on the score, with some finding it still dragged despite cuts.

== Background ==
The opera originated as a stage play by George Brant. The play, also called Grounded, premiered at the Edinburgh Fringe Festival in 2013, then became internationally popular. One New York production, at The Public Theater, starred Anne Hathaway and was directed by Julie Taymor. The play is a one-woman show in which the character is unnamed.

In 2014, the Metropolitan Opera had contracted Jeanine Tesori to compose a new work but had not agreed on a suitable subject, until the Met's dramaturg, Paul Cremo, attended a performance of Brant's play at New York's tiny Walkerspace Theater. Cremo then emailed Brant, saying "he heard an aria pulsing throughout it" and thought it could be produced as an opera. In 2018, Tesori's adaptation of Grounded was announced, alongside Missy Mazzoli's Lincoln in the Bardo, as the first two operas by women commissioned by the Metropolitan Opera. Brant was asked to adapt his play into the libretto for the opera, though he had not worked on an opera before.

Tesori's previous operas include her 2019 work Blue. Outside of opera, she is an experienced composer of musical theatre, including Shrek the Musical and the Tony Award-winning musicals Fun Home and Kimberly Akimbo.

On the announcement of the production by Washington National Opera, the opera's 'presenting sponsor' was listed as General Dynamics, an aerospace manufacturer and defense contractor. The opera's fictional lead character is said to have a background as an F-16 pilot, an aircraft developed by General Dynamics. After extensive criticism, Washington National Opera changed the webpage to list General Dynamics as a 'season sponsor', and also rewrote the opera's promotional text. Despite this, General Dynamics were thanked alongside other sponsors on stage before the premiere performance at the Kennedy Center.

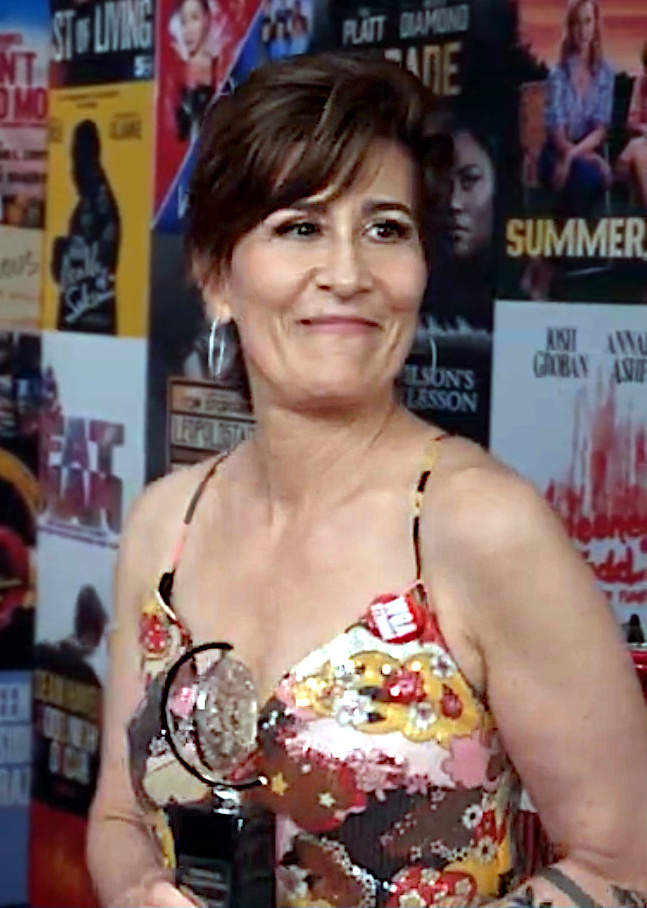
Grounded composer Jeanine Tesori

In moving the opera from its 2023 premiere in Washington to its 2024 New York premiere, Tesori and Brant collaborated on substantial revisions, cutting approximately 45 minutes of material.

== Roles ==
Roles, voice types, premiere cast
Role	Voice type	Premiere cast – October 28, 2023 Conductor: Daniela Candillari
Jess	mezzo-soprano	Emily D'Angelo
Eric	tenor	Joseph Dennis
Commander	bass	Morris Robinson
Trainer	tenor	Frederick Ballentine
Sensor	baritone	Kyle Miller
Also Jess	soprano	Teresa Perrotta
Sam	child's voice	Willa Cook
Kill Chain: Mission Coordinator	tenor	Michael Butler
Kill Chain: Ground Control	tenor	Joshua Dennis
Kill Chain: Joint Terminal Attack Controller	baritone	Rob McGinness
Kill Chain: Safety Observer	baritone	Jonathan Patton
Kill Chain: Judge Advocate General	bass	Sergio Martínez

== Synopsis ==
The opera features the story of an American F-16 pilot who, while on leave, has a brief relationship with a rancher from Wyoming and is later grounded due to pregnancy. During her grounding, she controls Reaper drones from a base near Las Vegas, attacking distant targets. As a result of the drone warfare, her mental health suffers, and she is imprisoned after intentionally crashing a drone.

=== Act One ===
Jess, a F-16 fighter pilot in the United States Air Force, is both an accomplished pilot and also the only woman in her squadron. While on leave from combat in Iraq, she meets the rancher Eric. They sleep together and fall in love before Jess returns to duty – and discovers she is pregnant.

Jess can either keep the baby or keep flying. Despite appeals from her Commander that she is invaluable to the squadron, she accepts the status DNIF, or "Duty Not Including Flying", and she and Eric soon welcome their daughter, Sam.

Five years pass. Longing for the sky, Jess returns to her Commander, who, instead of sending her back to her beloved F-16, assigns her to pilot drones remotely, from a trailer near Las Vegas. Jess protests. But the Commander counters that since operators work 12-hour shifts and return to their families each night, Jess will get "war with all the benefits of home". She, Eric and Sam move to Las Vegas.

In the trailer, Jess adjusts to her new team: the Sensor, a teenage, former gaming champion who controls the drone's cameras; the Kill Chain, a chain of command that, via headset, assigns missions and approves strikes; and two stoic Observers. Initial tedium gives way to unexpected adrenaline rushes as Jess launches strikes. Meanwhile, Eric gets a job as a blackjack dealer. Jess begins encountering an eerie Drone Squadron and a second, dissociated version of herself.

=== Act Two ===
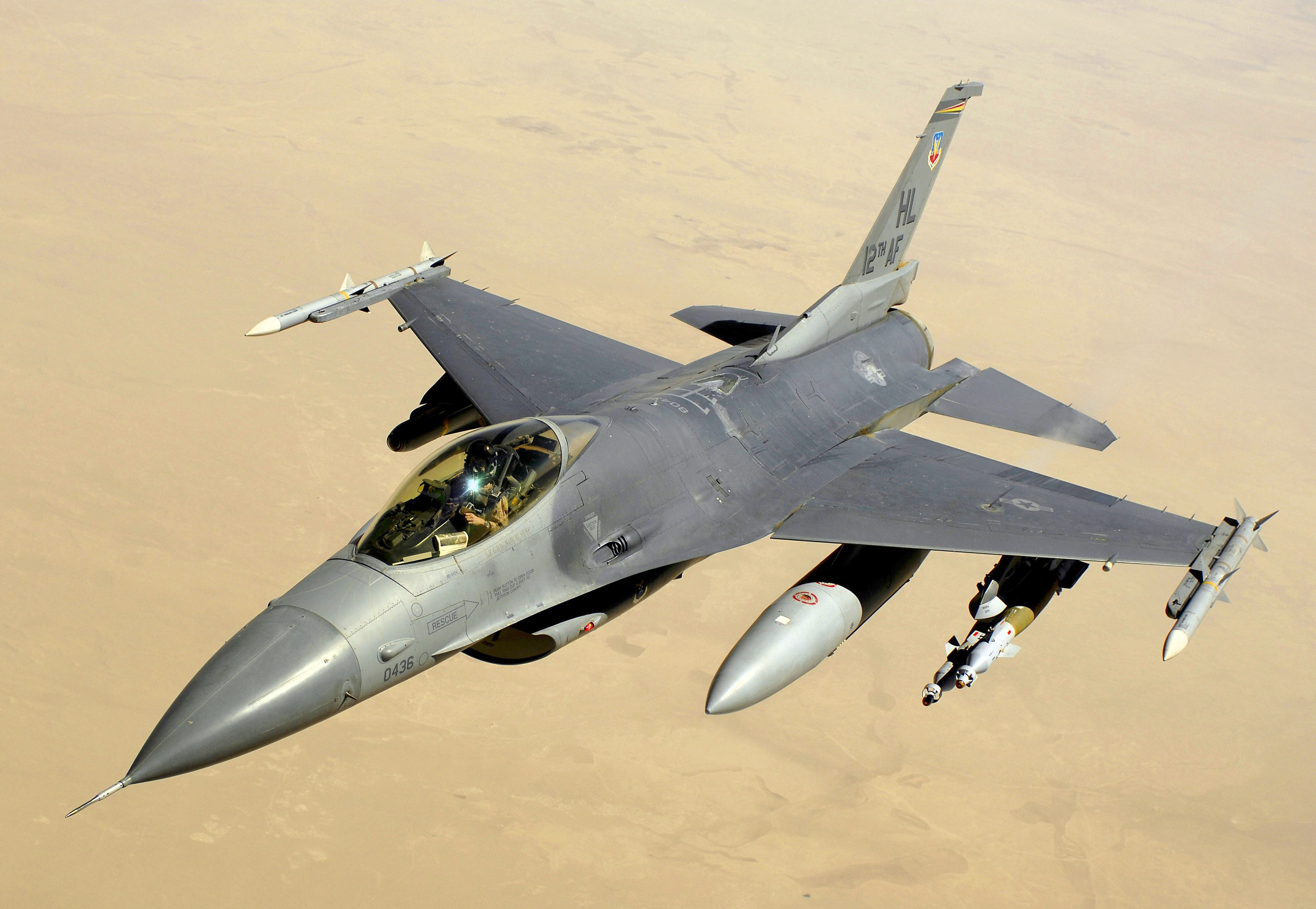
Jess, the opera's lead character, is an F-16 pilot. The premiere's original sponsor, General Dynamics, was the developer of the aircraft.

Jess and Sam are in the mall, surrounded by the free-sample-wielding Mall Squadron. In the dressing room, Jess fixates on who might be watching them through the mirror or security cameras on the wall – and suddenly she is back in the trailer, only this time, her screen shows dying American soldiers. Noting her mounting distress, Eric encourages her to "clap off the game", a gesture he uses at the casino when clocking out.

On the one-year anniversary of Jess' arrival in the trailer, the Commander assigns her a high-profile mission: track the car suspected to hold target number two on the kill list, and once he steps out and is identified, strike. Jess' relentless pursuit of her target and the intense strain of the mission blur the already faint lines between war and her personal life; she believes a sleeping Sam to be dead, refuses to take off her flight suit after work, and mentally splits into herself and a split personality named "Also Jess" during sex with Eric.

Finally, Jess tracks her target to his home – but he does not leave the car. As he drives off, a girl runs from the house, and the target springs from his car, waving her away: a positive identification. The Kill Chain orders the strike. But Jess, seeing Sam in the girl's place, intentionally crashes a Reaper drone. Her efforts are futile, however, as a backup pilot eliminates the target, much to Jess' horror. She is prosecuted and imprisoned after a court martial.

== Performance history and reception ==
=== 2023 Kennedy Center production ===
The opera premiered at the Kennedy Center on October 28, 2023, in a co-production of Washington National Opera and the Metropolitan Opera. Zachary Woolfe of the New York Times praised Emily D'Angelo in the lead role as the pilot Jess as "perfectly cast", though he also wrote there was a lack of chemistry between her and her onstage husband Eric, performed by an "affable" Joseph Dennis. Woolfe went on to compare the opera unfavourably with Tesori's previous opera, Blue. He also disagreed with Peter Gelb's assertion that Grounded is "an antiwar opera", instead stating "the piece seems to say that war is OK; there are just better and worse – more and less authentic – ways of waging it."

In a review for the Washington Post, Michael Brodeur praised the "surprising delicacy and daring" of Tesori's score and the individual performances of the singers, but criticized elements of the adaption of Brant's play. He questioned the expansion of the cast, feeling that other than the central character, "everyone feels optional". Brodeur too did not feel that Grounded could be called an anti-war opera, stating that for periods of the opera, representations of the drones "border on garish advertisement". He also felt that the character Jess was weaker than the Pilot of the original play. Brodeur stated that the production failed to humanize the victims of drone warfare "until the last possible moment" and overall, the opera felt "like a miss".

Writing in the Washington Classical Review, Charles T. Downey called Tesori's music "disappointingly thin and lackluster", with the exception of the male chorus. Downey praised Emily D'Angelo as "radiant", and also drew positive attention to Willa Cook as Jess's young daughter Sam. He described Morris Robinson as "stentorian" in his performance as the Commander. Deriding the fact that the opera contains an aria about the making of a PowerPoint presentation, Downey stated that both acts "dragged".

Kate Wingfield was more positive in her four-star review for Metro Weekly, stating that, despite issues with the adaption and libretto, "the production is driven by a wonderfully cohesive cast". Wingfield drew out Morris Robinson for special praise as an "utterly convincing presence".

In a review for BroadwayWorld, David Friscic was appreciative of Tesori's music, calling it "alternately sweeping, plaintive, elegiac, whimsical, satiric, mocking, poetic or emphatic". Friscic praised the sensitivity of Daniela Candillari as conductor, and was complimentary of the support cast, staging, and lighting. Friscic reserved the highest praise for lead Emily D'Angelo, referring to her "breathtaking vocal control and tone". His assessment of the opera overall was as "ground-breaking" though he stated that the audience's reaction would be "a matter of taste and aesthetics".

=== 2024 Metropolitan Opera production ===
45 minutes of the original 2 hour 25 minute run time was cut for the 2024 Metropolitan Opera production, which opened the season at the Met. Brant and Tesori skipped the last performance of the 2023 production in order to begin edits. The changes were made in a direct fashion, with Tesori saying " I just went to the score and went 'rip'".

The Metropolitan Opera production met with mixed-to-negative reviews, Zachary Woolfe of the New York Times saying that the opera does not "risk anything, musically or politically". Woolfe was positive about D'Angelo's performance, saying that she "would have been able to anchor a wilder piece". Woolfe also complimented Ben Bliss in the recast part of Eric, saying that Eric had become "closer to being a meaningful role". Woolfe felt, however, that the supporting characters were superfluous, saying "The piece hasn’t really shaken its origins as a solo". Woolfe also decried the musical depth and intensity as "sorely lacking". Page Six of the New York Post reported that Peter Gelb, the Metropolitan Opera's director, criticised Woolfe's review at a private function. Gelb claimed that there was an "agenda" against any opera that "smacks of accessibility".

Writing in OperaWire, critic David Salazar found the libretto uninspiring and lacking depth, though he was positive about the use of repetition. He felt that the identity of the opera was undermined by poorly timed humorous lines, writing that the opera featured: "solid buildups that are immediately undercut by ridicule". He was unsure whether the text was "intentionally toying with itself or simply lacking the means to express something deeper or more potent". He also criticised the pacing and the overall effect of the opera as a drama. However, Salazar was very positive on Emily D'Angelo's lead performance as Jess, saying that she had "salvaged" a "frustrating experience". He commented that she should get more opportunities to perform lead roles at the Metropolitan Opera. Salazar was also mostly complimentary about Tesori's score.

In Bachtrack, Kevin W Ng commented in his two star review that the Met's orchestra and chorus were "on peak form", but felt that the score was "unmemorable at best", and that it "drags". He also wrote that the production's "pleasantness" was at odds with the themes. Ng felt that the "sheer American jingoism of the piece" was "grating", commenting on lines such as "Boom goes Baghdad" in the context of the original production's sponsorship by General Dynamics. Ng also found fault with the "bevy of minor characters also distract from the central drama", though he found baritone debutants Kyle Miller and Timothy Murray impressive in "resonant tone" and "crystal diction". He found Ben Bliss "exquisite" as Eric and Ellie Dehn "luscious and radiant" as Jess' alter ego. Ng saved his highest praise for D'Angelo, saying "It’s worth seeing for D’Angelo alone – if only she had a vehicle worthy of her talents".
