= Grounded (play) =

2013 play by George Brant

- Written by: George Brant
- Characters: Pilot
- Original language: English
- Setting: Las Vegas

Premiere
- Date premiered: 2013
- Place premiered: San Francisco Playhouse

Grounded is a 2013 play by George Brant. The play was written as a solo performance with a single character, but has also been staged with two actors. Grounded tells the story of a female US Air Force pilot who is grounded when she becomes pregnant. Her duties are altered from flying F-16 jets to piloting drones remotely, causing her psychological distress. The play was adapted into an opera of the same name, which was first performed in 2023.

== Background ==
Brant was inspired to write Grounded when he saw a photograph in the New York Times of Major Stephanie Kelsen, a 20-year US Air Force veteran. In the image, Kelsen wears her flight suit whilst visibly pregnant. At the time the photograph was taken, Kelsen did not know whether she would fly again. Brant considered it an "amazing photo" demonstrating the overlap of "maternity, sexuality and the warrior," and it helped provide a pathway for him to explore the dilemmas of drone warfare.

== Synopsis ==
The play features a female US Air Force pilot who is grounded from flying duties due to pregnancy. She is ordered to fly drones instead, which she does from a base near Las Vegas. Her targets are thousands of miles away, which causes her to become disassociated and distressed. A major theme is the contrast and boundaries between her home life and her 12-hour shifts in the drone facility. At the end of the play, the pilot intentionally misses a target and is court-martialled.

== Performance history and reception ==
Grounded had been produced close to 100 times as of 2017. Among these were a two-actor version at the Park Theatre, London in 2015, which incorporated British Sign Language.

In 2015 Anne Hathaway starred in a production of Grounded at The Public Theater, in New York City. In a four-star review, Alexis Soloski of The Guardian described the production as "unnervingly gorgeous and overwrought". Soloski stated that whilst Hathaway is not usually cast in "macho" roles, she "delivers".

Grounded won the National New Play Network's 2012 Smith Prize and a Fringe First award at the 2013 Edinburgh Fringe Festival.
