= Patullo =

Patullo is a surname. Notable people with the surname include:

- Carla Patullo, American musician
- Kevin Patullo (born 1981), American football player and coach
