= Porno =

Porno may refer to:

- Pornography, explicit depiction of sexual subject matter with principal intention of sexually exciting a viewer
  - Pornographic film
  - Pornographic magazine
- Porno (novel), 2002, by Irvine Welsh, later re-titled as T2 Trainspotting
- Porno (2019 film), a 2019 American film

== See also ==
- Zack and Miri Make a Porno, a 2008 comedic film
- Porno for Pyros, an American musical group
- Porno Graffitti, a Japanese rock band
