= Larry Saperstein =

American actor (born 1998)

- Born: Laurence Benjamin Saperstein; April 12, 1998 (age 28); Islip, New York, U.S.
- Education: Pace University
- Occupations: Actor, dancer
- Years active: 2007–present
- Website: www.larrysaperstein.com

Laurence Benjamin Saperstein (born April 12, 1998) is an American actor and dancer. He stars as Big Red in the Disney+ series High School Musical: The Musical: The Series.

== Life and career ==
Saperstein is from Islip, New York on the south shore of Long Island. He is Jewish. He began dancing at age 6 and was a member of the Tap City Youth Ensemble. He spent several summers at the Usdan Summer Camp for the Arts. He attended Islip High School and was selected as a 2016 Long Island Scholar Artist. He graduated with a Bachelor of Fine Arts in Production and Design for Stage and Screen from Pace University in New York City in 2020.

Saperstein has been acting since he was 3 years old at a community theater with his parents. Larry landed his first role at the age of 6 as Winthrop Paroo in Star Playhouse's production of The Music Man. He has had several theatre roles in Long Island and touring on the West Coast.

Saperstein played Lucius in the 2015 ABC Television film Fan Girl starring Kiernan Shipka.

In February 2019, it was announced Saperstein would star in his breakout onscreen role in the Disney+ series High School Musical: The Musical: The Series as Big Red, Ricky Bowen (Joshua Bassett)'s best friend who fills in as the school production's stage manager. The series premiered that November. Saperstein was the final main to be cast.

In June 2021, Saperstein came out as bisexual via social media.

== Filmography ==
Year	Title	Role	Notes
2011	Finding	Boy	Short film
2011	Blindfold	Jeremy	Short film
2011	We Are the Hartmans		
2015	Fan Girl	Lucius	Television film
2019	Porno	Todd	
2019	First Wives Club	Timmy	Episode: "Plan B"
2019–2023	High School Musical: The Musical: The Series	Big Red	Main role (Season 1–2); Recurring role (Season 4); Guest star (Season 3)
TBA	Gap Year		Second Unit Director

== Stage ==
Year	Title	Role	Notes
2007	The Music Man	Winthrop Paroo	Star Playhouse, Commack
2008	Evita	Children's Choir	Star Playhouse, Commack
2010	Oliver!	Charley Bates	John W. Engeman Theater, Northport
2009–2010	Miracle on 34th Street	Tommy Mara Jr.	West Coast tour
2010	Fiddler on the Roof	Ensemble	John W. Engeman Theater, Northport
2014	Cats	Skimbleshanks	Islip Town Hall West, Islip
2016	Clybourne Park		Lighting designer; Islip Town Hall West, Islip
2018	Peter and the Starcatcher	Lighting Designer	Pace University
