= Timepiece (disambiguation) =

Timepiece is often another word for a clock.

Timepiece may also refer to:

== Time measurement ==
- Watch
- Grandfather clock
- Sundial
- Hourglass

== Film ==
- Time Piece, film by Jim Henson

== Music ==
- Timepieces: The Best of Eric Clapton
- Timepiece (album), Kenny Rogers
- "Time Piece", song by Nick Drake from Family Tree (Nick Drake album) and Tuck Box
- "Timepiece", by Blood Has Been Shed from I Dwell on Thoughts of You
- "Time Piece", song by Bad Habits (Nav album)

== Other ==
- Timepiece (horse)
