= Usdan Summer Camp for the Arts =

American educational day camp

Coordinates: 40.761766°N 73.390067°W

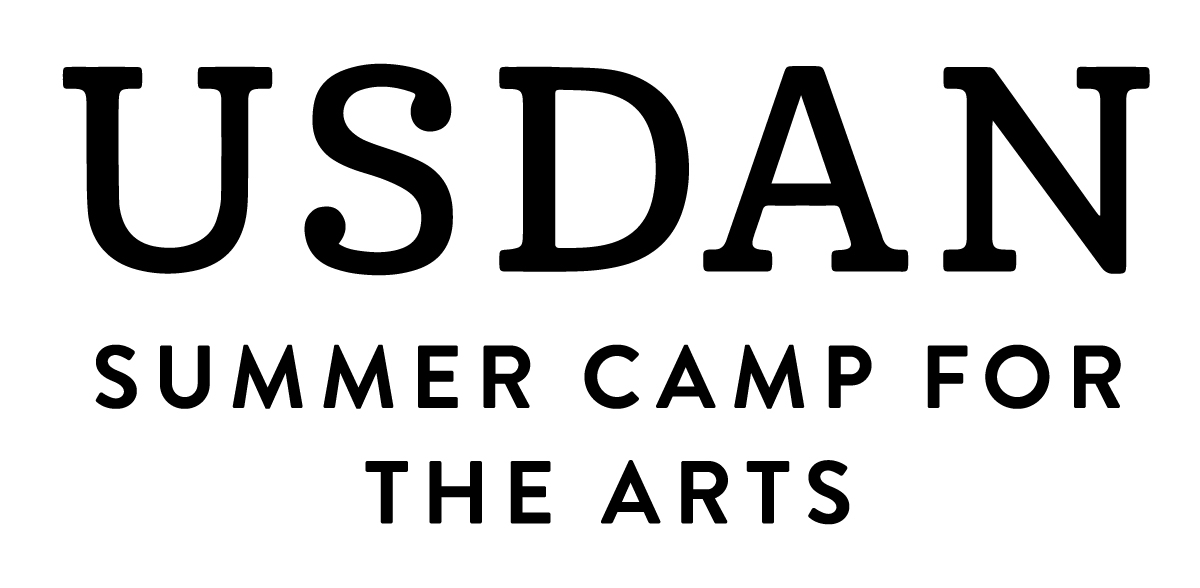
The USDAN logo

The Usdan Summer Camp for the Arts (USDAN; formally known as the Usdan Center for the Creative and Performing Arts, and previously named Nathaniel and Suzanne Usdan Center for the Creative and Performing Arts) is a Wheatley Heights, Long Island-based summer day camp. It is situated on 140 acres (57 hectares or 0.57 km²) of woodland.

== Programs and classes ==
The camp is organized into divisions based on grade level: Discovery (Pre-K and 1); Partners In the Arts (2 and 3); Junior (4 through 6); and Senior (6 through 12). Students can choose classes from the following disciplines: art, chess, dance, creative writing, music, or theater. They can also choose between a "major" (two 50-minute periods) and a "minor" (one period) activity. The schedule has a recreation period, lunch and daily Usdan Festival Concerts throughout the three-, four-, or seven-week camp session.

The camp now offers classes in creative writing, video arts, 3D design and printing, chess, jazz and tap dance, nature, organic gardening, fashion design, cartooning, architecture, animation, ukulele and guitar, Quidditch, and others.

== Campus ==
The Usdan Campus is composed of 140 acres of woodland.

Students have access to close to 70 studios and theaters, including the Andrew and Lily McKinley Amphitheater—a 1,000-seat campus center that hosts Usdan's daily Festival Concerts. Other campus buildings include: the Samuel and Lucille Lemberg Drama Center, the Jerrold Ross Discovery Center, and the Maurice B. Hexter Center. The campus also has four modern tennis courts, three large outdoor swimming pools, two yoga platforms, an archery range, a Quidditch field, and a recreation area for basketball and other games.

== History ==
The camp was founded in 1968 by Dr. Maurice B. Hexter^{A}, the executive vice president of the Federation of Jewish Philanthropies, musician and opera singer Andrew McKinley, and philanthropist Samuel Lemberg^{B}, who provided initial funding for the project. It was opened to about 1,000 students. A phrase from the early days of Usdan that remains as the camp mantra is "Lose yourself for the summer. Find yourself for a lifetime."

In 2016, the camp launched the Usdan Leadership Institute for the Arts. Tailored for Usdan's high school students (9th to 12th graders). Members receive leadership training twice a week and can mentor younger students or pursue a role for the camp.

In 2018, the camp celebrated its 50th anniversary summer.

== Leadership and faculty ==
Mr. McKinley became the camp's founding executive director, a position he held for 16 years. Upon his retirement, the Usdan Board appointed cellist and educator Dale Lewis as his successor. Mr. Lewis held that role until he stepped down in 2015. He is currently Executive Director Emeritus. In 2015, Arts Educator Lauren Brandt Schloss, the camp's current executive director, joined Usdan.

Usdan's leadership includes its board of trustees and a leadership council of Long Island community and business leaders. As of January 2019, Usdan board of trustees members includes: Lillian Z. Cohen (Treasurer); Richard Eisenberg; Roslyn Jaffe; Michele Lowe (Secretary); Robert Nederlander, Jr.; Lesley Friedman Rosenthal; Dr. Jerrold Ross (Past President); and John Usdan (President). And Usdan Leadership Council include: Marilyn & Russell Albanese; Shari Alexander; Amanda Fugazy & Scott Brennan; Sheree & James Incorvaia; Angela Jaggar; Irene & Peter J. Klein; Rosemarie Klipper; Kirk Kordeleski; Sandra & Eric Krasnoff; Debra & Dale Lewis; Jane Monheit & Rick Montalbano; Joy & John Racanelli; Jennifer & Jonathan Allan Soros.

Since the center's inception, the board has completed capital campaigns to build theaters and teaching studios on Usdan's campus.

== Notable alumni ==
- Mariah Carey, singer and songwriter
- Natalie Portman, actress
- Olivia Thirlby, actress
- Jane Monheit, jazz singer
- Larry Saperstein, actor
- Stacy London, TV personality
- Seth Rudetsky, Broadway performer

== Notes ==
A.Hexter was a leader in New York (and global) Jewish and other good-works causes from 1929, when he moved from the US to Jerusalem to administer the Palestine Emergency Fund, through the 1960s. He died in 1980.
B.Samuel Lemberg's daughter was Suzanne Usdan, hence the name of the camp. Lemberg emigrated to the US in 1905, built a fortune in real estate, and according to his grandson, believing he had no one to succeed him in running his company started to give away his fortune in 1945. Suzanne married Nathaniel "Duke" Usdan who was the heir to a paper company. The paper company's building still exists, with the Usdan name, at 401 Washington Street in NYC.
