= The John Peel Session (Nick Drake EP) =

EP by Nick Drake
- Released: November 17, 2014
- Recorded: 5 August 1969; March 23, 1970
- Studio: Maida Vale, Studio 5
- Genre: Contemporary folk
- Length: 19:16
- Labels: Antar Records / Universal Music Catalogue
- Producers: Mike Harding, Colin Nichol

Nick Drake chronology
Tuck Box (2013)	The John Peel Session (2014)	The Making Of Five Leaves Left (2025)

The John Peel Session is an EP by English folk musician Nick Drake, released in November 2014 by Universal Music Catalogue & Antar Records, and was released in both 10" vinyl and digital formats.

The recordings originate from two BBC John Peel Sessions: one from August 1969 and another from March 1970 with Colin Nichol, released alongside the biography Nick Drake: Remembered for a While. Only 1,000 copies were produced.

== Recording and release ==
Tracks 1–3 were recorded on 5 August 1969 and broadcast on 6 August 1969. This session produced solo versions of four songs. The original recordings were wiped according to Peel in 2001, but bootleg off-air versions were recorded by fans. It was previously thought that only 4 songs were recorded, but a version of "Bryter Layter" was also found in the recording. Tracks 4 and 5 were recorded on 23 March 1970 in the Night Ride Session. Drake was accompanied by flautist Iain Cameron and the session aired on 13 April 1970. Cameron said that between four and eight songs were recorded.

Both "Time of No Reply" and "Three Hours" were previously circulating within trading circles and released in unofficial form in 2006.

In August 2014, The John Peel Session was released on 10" vinyl in a special signature box edition of the biography Nick Drake: Remembered For A While to commemorate the 40th anniversary of Drake's death. In November 2014, the EP was made available for download.

== Track listing ==
All songs written by Nick Drake.

1. "Time of No Reply" – 2:42
2. "River Man" – 4:06
3. "Three Hours" – 5:01
4. "Bryter Layter" – 3:17
5. "'Cello Song" – 4:10

== Personnel ==
- Nick Drake – vocals, acoustic guitar
- Pete Ritzema – producer
- Colin Nichol – engineer (1970 session)
- Mike Harding – engineer (1969 session)
