= Nomadica =

Studio album by Carla Patullo
- Released: August 22, 2025
- Length: 34:57
- Label: The Soundry
- Producers: Carla Patullo, Martha Mooke

Nomadica is a studio album by American singer Carla Patullo, released on August 22, 2025. The album features the Scorchio Quartet, Tonality, and Martha Wainwright. At the 68th Annual Grammy Awards, it won the Grammy Award for Best New Age, Ambient, or Chant Album.

== Critical reception ==
Nomadica received positive coverage from music publications, with reviewers highlighting its themes of grief, memory, and healing. In a review for Mystic Sons, Chris Bound rated the album 8/10 and praised its orchestration and emotional focus.

== Track listing ==
All tracks are written by Carla Patullo, except where noted.

No.	Title	Writer(s)	Length
1.	"Our Love Is"		4:08
2.	"Nomadica"		4:48
3.	"Arrival (feat. Lorenza Ponce)"		4:32
4.	"A Handblown World (feat. Lorenza Ponce)"		4:39
5.	"Undercurrent (feat. Leah Coloff)"		3:55
6.	"Isochronic Waves (feat. Frederika Krier)"		2:25
7.	"Lightning (feat. Martha Mooke)"		3:44
8.	"Below the Surface"		3:03
9.	"Fly Under (feat. Martha Wainwright)"	Carla Patullo; Martha Wainwright	3:43
Total length:			34:57

== Accolades ==
Accolades for Nomadica
Year	Award	Category	Result	Ref.
2026	68th Annual Grammy Awards	Best New Age, Ambient, or Chant Album	Won	
