= Tuckbox =

Tuckbox may refer to:

- Lunch box, also a private stash of food for children at boarding school
- Tuck Box Nick Drake compilation album
- The Tuck Box Fairy Tail cottage by Hugh W. Comstock
