= Porno (2019 film) =

- Film poster
- Directed by: Keola Racela
- Written by: Laurence Vannicelli; Matt Black
- Produced by: Sarah Oh; Chris Cole
- Starring: Larry Saperstein; Jillian Mueller; Glenn Stott; Katelyn Pearce; Evan Daves; Robbie Tann
- Cinematography: John Wakayama Carey
- Music by: Carla Patullo
- Production companies: Fangoria; Evoke
- Distributed by: Shudder
- Release dates: March 21, 2019 (SXSW); May 8, 2020 (United States)
- Running time: 98 minutes
- Country: United States
- Language: English

Porno is a 2019 American comedy horror film directed by Keola Racela and starring Katelyn Pearce, Jillian Mueller, Larry Saperstein, Glenn Stott, Evan Daves, and Robbie Tann. The film premiered at the 2019 SXSW Film Festival in Austin, Texas, and released to virtual theaters, due to Covid-19, via Alamo Drafthouse Cinema and other theaters on April 10, 2020, and release to VOD on May 8, 2020. It is a Fangoria Presents production.

== Plot ==
Set in the early 1990s, five teen employees of a small town movie theater find a mysterious film reel and decide to play it after the theater closes. Watching the vintage X-rated film unleashes a succubus, who tries to seduce each of the five teens as they attempt to escape the theater intact.

The day starts off with two of the teens, Abe and Todd, outside of a house in the suburbs as they peep through a window, watching a couple have sex inside. Todd wants to leave and tells Abe they will get in trouble, so the two of them hop on their bikes and ride down the sidewalk to the theater where they work. Inside the theater, they and their fellow employees stand around in a prayer circle led by their boss, Mr. Pike, who tells them they can have a movie night after they close and clean the theater. As the teens fight over which movie to watch, A League of Their Own or Encino Man, they hear a noise inside the theater. A crazy old man is running around by the screen. They attempt to get him to leave, but he runs through a boarded up opening in the lobby. As the teens peer inside, they see that it leads to a basement.

The five of them decide to go down together to get the man out instead of calling Mr. Pike. Once down there, they find a room filled with old tin cans of film reels. Abe brings one of the reels upstairs, and they all vote to watch it for movie night, except for Jeff the projectionist, who worries that it might break the projector because it is so old. He is out-voted though, and they start playing the film, which is a weird pornographic film that unleashes a succubus named Lilith.

== Cast ==
- Evan Daves as Abe
- Larry Saperstein as Todd
- Jillian Mueller as Chaz
- Glenn Stott as Ricky
- Robbie Tann as "Heavy Metal" Jeff
- Katelyn Pearce as Lilith
- Bill Phillips as Mr. Pike
- Peter Reznikoff as Lord Beekman
- Amber Paul as Woman
- David Arrow as Man
- Blake French as Burly Man
- Brian J. Alford as Sorcerer

== Reception ==
The film has a 77% rating on Rotten Tomatoes, based on 52 critic reviews. The site's consensus reads, "Porno mines sexual repression to produce a laughably lurid - and genuinely scary - outing that should delight genre fans in search of a good time." Jude Dry of Indiewire gave it a B+. Chris Salce of Film Threat gave it 8 out of 10. Trace Thurman of Bloody Disgusting gave it two-and-a-half skulls.
