= The Making of Five Leaves Left =

Box set by Nick Drake
- Released: 25 July 2025
- Recorded: February 1968 – April 1969
- Studios: Sound Techniques; Caius College, Cambridge
- Genre: Contemporary folk
- Length: 2:39:26
- Label: Island
- Producer: Joe Boyd

Nick Drake chronology
The John Peel Session (2014)	The Making of Five Leaves Left (2025)

Professional ratings
Aggregate scores
Source	Rating
Metacritic	100/100
Review scores
Source	Rating
AllMusic	4.5/5 stars
Pitchfork	9.0/10
PopMatters	10/10
Record Collector	5/5 stars

The Making of Five Leaves Left is a music boxed set, released on 25 July 2025 via Island Records, which features studio outtakes and alternative versions of songs by the English singer-songwriter and musician Nick Drake recorded during his sessions for his debut 1969 LP, Five Leaves Left. It was released in both 4LP and 4CD configurations.

Discs 1–3 feature a collection of demos, alternate studio takes and Cambridge home reels covering sessions from early 1968 to April 1969 – including the earliest Sound Techniques session and a newly found Paul de Rivaz Cambridge reel. De Rivaz came to see Michael Burdett when he was performing his show, Strange Face: Adventures with a Lost Nick Drake Recording. On learning about, and having heard, the de Rivaz recording, Burdett informed the Drake estate of its existence. Disc 4/LP4 of the boxed set is the original album, fully remastered, sequenced as Joe Boyd prepared it in mid‑June 1969.

A 60-page book authored by Neil Storey and Richard Morton Jack is included with the set. The book includes a detailed session history of all the tracks and recording notes.

== Compiling and production ==
The project took nine years from conception in 2016 to release. The Nick Drake Estate originally avoided anniversary deluxe editions to maintain focus on the original album's purity. The rediscovery of master reels and previously unknown tapes (including recordings held by Beverley Martyn in 2014, and at Caius College) prompted the estate to undertake the comprehensive release.

== Track listing ==
All songs written by Nick Drake.

=== CD1: 1st Sound Techniques Session aka The Beverley Martyn demo & Alt Takes from February 1968 to April 1969 ===
1. "Mayfair" (1st Sound Techniques Session – March 1968) – 2:17
2. "Time Has Told Me" (1st Sound Techniques Session – March 1968) – 3:37
3. "Man in a Shed" (1st Sound Techniques Session – March 1968) – 3:05
4. "Fruit Tree" (1st Sound Techniques Session – March 1968) – 3:31
5. "Saturday Sun" (1st Sound Techniques Session – March 1968) – 2:43
6. "Strange Face" (1st Sound Techniques Session, March 1968) – 3:42
7. "Strange Face" (Rough Mix with Guide Vocal, September 11, 1968) – 4:24
8. "Day Is Done (Take 5, April 11, 1968) – 3:17
9. "Day Is Done" (Take 2, November 12, 1968) – 2:38
10. "Day Is Done" (Take 7 – April 3, 1969) – 2:30
11. "Man in a Shed" (Take 1, May 10, 1968) – 3:07
12. "My Love Left with the Rain" (Cambridge, Lent Term, May 1968) – 3:51

=== CD2: Paul de Rivaz Reel – 1968 / Out-Takes November 1968 ===
1. "Blossom" (Cambridge, Lent Term, 1968) – 4:25
2. "Instrumental" (Cambridge, Lent Term, 1968) – 1:40
3. "Made to Love Magic" (Cambridge, Lent Term, 1968) – 5:28
4. "Mickey's Tune" (Cambridge, Lent Term, 1968) – 3:23
5. "The Thoughts of Mary Jane" (Cambridge, Lent Term, 1968) – 4:24
6. "Day Is Done" (Cambridge, Lent Term, 1968) – 2:48
7. "Time Has Told Me" (Cambridge, Lent Term, 1968) – 2:39
8. "Three Hours" (Take 2, November 11, 1968) – 4:23
9. "Time Has Told Me" (Take 4, November 11, 1968) – 4:33
10. "Strange Face" (Take 1, November 12, 1968) – 4:12
11. "Saturday Sun" (Take 1, November 12, 1968) – 4:23
12. "Fruit Tree" (Take 4, November 12, 1968) – 4:54

=== CD3: Out-Takes from December 1968 to April 1969 ===
1. "Time of No Reply" (Take 3 into Take 4, December 20, 1968) – 2:55
2. "'Cello Song" (Take 4, January 4, 1969) – 4:49
3. "Mayfair" (Take 5, January 4, 1969) – 3:30
4. "River Man" (Take 1, January 4, 1969) – 5:11
5. "Way to Blue" (Cambridge, Winter 1968) – 2:50
6. "The Thoughts of Mary Jane" (Take 2, April 3, 1969) – 3:29
7. "Saturday Sun" (Take 1 into Take 2, April 22, 1969) – 4:56
8. "River Man" (Take 2, April 2, 1969) – 4:43

=== CD4: The Original Five Leaves Left Album – Released 3rd July 1969 (2000 Remaster) ===
1. "Time Has Told Me" – 4:24
2. "River Man" – 4:18
3. "Three Hours" – 6:12
4. "Way to Blue" – 3:08
5. "Day Is Done" – 2:25
6. "'Cello Song" – 4:44
7. "The Thoughts of Mary Jane" – 3:18
8. "Man in a Shed" – 3:51
9. "Fruit Tree" – 4:46
10. "Saturday Sun" – 4:03

== Charts ==
Chart performance for The Making of Five Leaves Left
Chart (2025)	Peak position
Belgian Albums (Ultratop Flanders)	156
German Albums (Offizielle Top 100)	28
