= Morris Robinson =

American opera singer (born 1969)

- Born: Morris DeRhon Robinson; March 18, 1969 (age 57); Atlanta, Georgia, U.S.
- Occupation: Opera singer (bass)
- Years active: 1997–present
- Spouse: Denise Wright
- Children: 1
- Website: morrisrobinson.com

Morris DeRhon Robinson (born March 18, 1969) is an American bass opera singer and former All-American college football player who has performed both with the Metropolitan Opera and at Carnegie Hall in New York City, at the Seattle Opera, at La Scala in Milan, Italy, at the Sydney Opera House in Australia, and in many other opera houses throughout the United States and internationally. He has also served as an artistic advisor to the Cincinnati Opera, artist-in-residence for the Atlanta Symphony Orchestra, and Resident Artist at Harvard University. He was the first African-American artist to sign with a major classical record label.

== Early life ==
A native of Atlanta, Georgia, Robinson is the son of a Baptist minister; his interest in music started at an early age. He was a member of the Atlanta Boy Choir and attended the Northside School for the Performing Arts (now North Atlanta High School), where he excelled in both sports and music. In addition to playing on the football team, he was a member of the all-city band and all-state chorus as well as the first student in school history allowed to participate in both Chorus and Band.

Robinson's desire to play college football resulted in accepting a scholarship to play for The Citadel in Charleston, South Carolina, where he was a three-time 1-AA All American offensive lineman, graduating in 1991 with a bachelor's degree in English.

Robinson became famous as "The Singing Knob" for his impromptu serenades for fellow cadets and for his performance of "O Holy Night" at the annual Christmas candlelight concert. He also co-founded and sang in the school's gospel chorus.

Robinson's talent was featured in Sports Illustrated and on CBS Sports College Football Today. In 1991, he was invited to sing the national anthem at the NBA All-Star Game in Charlotte, North Carolina.

After graduation, Robinson accepted a position with the 3M company as a regional sales representative in the Washington D.C. area.

En route to a sales conference in California, Robinson met his future wife, Denise Wright, who was working as an airline flight attendant.

Robinson is a member of the Beta Mu chapter of Omega Psi Phi fraternity.

== Musical career ==
While living in the Washington D.C. area, Robinson had occasionally sung at social events. In 1997, his wife, Denise, arranged a successful tryout with the Choral Arts Society of Washington. After moving to New Hampshire to accept a new job he enrolled in a continuing education course at the New England Conservatory of Music and performed in weekend productions. His singing attracted the attention of Associate Professor Sharon Daniels at the Boston University Opera Institute, who encouraged him to apply; he entered the program in 1999. That same year he made his operatic debut with the Boston Lyric Opera as the King of Egypt in Aida; subsequent engagements included The Marriage of Figaro, Madama Butterfly, Don Giovanni, Il trovatore and Salome. In 2001 he placed third in a New England region voice audition which led to his being invited to do a stage audition for Maestro James Levine, this resulted in his being one of only nine singers in the world accepted into the Lindemann Young Artist Development Program, sponsored by the Metropolitan Opera. His debut at The Met in 2002 was in a production of Fidelio, later productions have included The Magic Flute, Nabucco, Les Troyens and Tannhäuser. Numerous appearances with the Los Angeles Opera have included roles in Don Carlo, Rigoletto and Die Entführung aus dem Serail (The Abduction from the Seraglio). He has also performed with opera companies in St. Louis, Philadelphia, Seattle, Cincinnati, Pittsburgh, Dallas and Sydney, Australia.

Recently Robinson has broadened his career by performing in musicals. In 2012 he won the role of Joe in Show Boat with the San Francisco Opera, he reprised the role with the Houston Grand Opera, Lyric Opera of Chicago, Dallas Opera and the Washington National Opera at the John F. Kennedy Center for the Performing Arts. While in San Francisco he was also a last minute addition for the role of the Bonze in Madama Butterfly. In the fall of 2016 he made his debut at La Scala in Milan, Italy with the lead role in Porgy and Bess; with additional performances in 2019 at Cincinnati and the Vienna Volksoper.

He has also performed regularly with the National Symphony Orchestra and the New York Philharmonic as well as with the symphony orchestras in Baltimore, Boston, Chicago, Nashville, Fort Worth, Montreal, Los Angeles, San Francisco and São Paulo, Brazil. He has also appeared with the Los Angeles Philharmonic at the Hollywood Bowl and performed Verdi's Requiem with the City of London Sinfonia at Royal Albert Hall. He was the second person named as artist-in-residence for the Atlanta Symphony Orchestra and in 2017 was named an artistic advisor for the Cincinnati Opera. Additional appearances have included music festivals in Savannah, Georgia and Aspen, Colorado as well as at the Tanglewood Music Center and Ravinia Festival. He was the first black artist to sign a recording deal with a major classical label; his first album Going Home was released in 2007 by Decca Records. He has appeared on the NBC Today Show and been featured in interviews on NPR, the BBC and CSN International; he has been profiled in numerous major publications including USA Today, The Washington Post, the Los Angeles Times, the New York Times and The Sydney Morning Herald. In 2017 he was The Citadel's commencement speaker and recipient of an Honorary Doctorate; in 2019 he was named Resident Artist at Harvard University.

He played in the 2022 movie 'The Magic Flute' with F. Murray Abraham and Jack Wolfe.
