= Janai Brugger =

American operatic soprano

Janai Brugger (born January 3, 1983) is an American operatic soprano. In 2014, music critic F. Paul Driscoll described her in Opera News as "gifted with a supple, beautifully shaded lyric soprano."

== Education and early career ==
Born in Chicago, Illinois, Brugger earned a Bachelor of Music degree in 2005 from DePaul University in Chicago, which she attended through scholarships provided by the National Society of Collegiate Scholars. That same year, she won first place in the National Association of Teachers of Singing competition. While attending DePaul, she performed roles in several student opera productions, including Dido in Dido and Aeneas, Ilia in Idomeneo, and Mercedes in Carmen. She later studied voice with Shirley Verrett at the University of Michigan School of Music, Theatre & Dance, earning a master's degree in vocal performance in 2009. At Michigan, she performed the role of Tatyana in Eugene Onegin under conductor Martin Katz.

In 2006, Brugger became a member of the young artist program at Chicago Opera Theater, where she made her professional opera debut as the First Witch in Dido and Aeneas. That same year, she pursued further studies at the Chautauqua Institution with Marlena Malas and appeared as a soloist with the Indianapolis Symphony Orchestra under conductor Raymond Leppard. In 2008, Brugger won a position in "The Song Continues" masterclass at Carnegie Hall, where she worked with Marilyn Horne. In 2009, she portrayed the role of Adina in The Elixir of Love for the Lyric Opera of Chicago's “Opera in the Neighborhoods” program.

In 2010, Brugger became a member of the San Francisco Opera's Merola Opera Program. From 2010 to 2012, Brugger was a member of the Young Artist Program at the Los Angeles Opera (LAO). She made her debut with the LAO as Barbarina in The Marriage of Figaro in October 2010. She has since appeared with the LAO as the page in Rigoletto (2010), Musetta in La Boheme (2012), and Pamina in The Magic Flute (2013).

== Career ==
In 2012, Brugger won the Metropolitan Opera National Council Auditions and was awarded the zarzuela prize and the "Prize of the Public at the Operalia, The World Opera Competition. Since then her career has flourished. In 2012, she made her debut with the Metropolitan Opera as Liu in Turandot, her debut with the Palm Beach Opera as Juliette in Roméo et Juliette, and appeared as both The First Lady in The Magic Flute, as well as the soprano soloist in Kurt Weill's Die Zaubernacht at the Ravinia Festival with conductor James Conlon leading the Chicago Symphony Orchestra (CSO).

In 2013, Brugger appeared as a soloist with the CSO again at the Cincinnati May Festival, performed under conductor Christopher Bell at the Grant Park Music Festival, portrayed the High Priestess in Aida at the Hollywood Bowl, made her debut at the Hawaii Opera Theatre as Liu, and made her European debut at the Peter Dvorský International Music Festival. In February 2014, Brugger returned to the Metropolitan Opera as Helena in The Enchanted Island. She made her debut with Opera Colorado as Micaëla in Carmen in May 2014. For the HBO television show Lovecraft Country, Brugger recorded an operatic setting of the poem "Catch the Fire" by Sonia Sanchez.
