= Mark Edwards (British businessman) =

- Occupations: CEO, MDS

Mark Edwards is a British businessman and the current CEO of MDS.

== Career ==
Prior to joining Mformation, a mobile device management (MDM (Modular Digital Multitrack) software provider, as CEO based in New Jersey USA. In 2005, they opened a new office in Bangalore, India. he was the EVP of Marketing and Sales for Symbian, a wireless operating system company developing the OS for next-generation data-enabled mobile phones, owned by Ericsson, Nokia, Panasonic, Psion, Samsung Electronics, Siemens and Sony Ericsson. He led Symbian's global sales, marketing, public relations, strategy, developer relations, and partner management.

Edwards has served on the boards of a number of wireless technology providers as non-Executive Chairman. Prior to Symbian, he held executive management positions at Psion Computers PLC and Spring Group PLC, and founded and served as CEO of CRT Multimedia Ltd, an international multimedia electronic publishing company. Prior to founding CRT Multimedia, he was head of Windows marketing at Microsoft UK Ltd. and took Windows from under 10% market share to over 90% in 18 months. He also served as Product and Program Manager for the DAT (digital audio tape) global product line at Hewlett Packard, CPB.

Edwards joined MDS, a convergent real-time billing company as CEO in 2013.

== Personal ==
Edwards holds a BSc in Electronic and Computing Engineering, 1st class from Birmingham University.
