= Shawn Okpebholo =

American composer, musicologist and music educator

- Born: March 28, 1981 (age 45)
- Occupation: Composer
- Years active: 1995–present
- Website: shawnokpebholo.com

Shawn E. Okpebholo is a Nigerian American composer of contemporary classical music.

== Early life and education ==
Shawn Okpebholo was born on March 28, 1981, and was raised by a single mother in the projects of Lexington, Kentucky. He grew up in the Salvation Army church, where he received free music lessons from a young age. His first instrument was the baritone horn, which he played in the Salvation Army brass band. As a teenager, he began composition lessons with James Curnow, a fellow church member and music professor at Asbury University. These experiences have been cited as Okpebholo's inspiration for his desire to spread music to places that are underserved.

Okpebholo obtained a bachelor's degree in music composition from Asbury University. He earned his master's and doctoral degrees in composition from the College-Conservatory of Music (CCM) at the University of Cincinnati.

== Career ==
Okpebholo's music has been commissioned by organizations including the Chicago Symphony Orchestra, the United States Air Force Strings, Imani Winds, WindSync, Urban Arias, Sparks & Wiry Cries, and the Copland House Ensemble, as well as Tanglewood, Aspen, and Newport Classical music festivals. His art songs have been performed in concert by the Lyric Opera of Chicago, Los Angeles Opera, Fort Worth Opera, Portland Opera, and Des Moines Metro Opera. His choral music has been championed by ensembles such as the Santa Fe Desert Chorale, the American Spiritual Ensemble, and the Choir of Trinity Church Wall Street. His chamber music has been performed by ensembles including Eighth Blackbird, Picosa, the 21st Century Consort, the Lincoln Trio, and the Copland House Ensemble, while his orchestral works have been performed by the Chicago, Cincinnati, and Houston Symphonies, the San Francisco and Saint Paul Chamber Orchestras, the Spoleto Festival Orchestra, and the Lexington Philharmonic, where he served as Saykaly Garbulinska Composer-in-Residence.

His collaborators include vocalists J'Nai Bridges, Lawrence Brownlee, Rhiannon Giddens, Will Liverman, Michael Mayes, Ryan McKinny, and Tamara Wilson; pianists Aldo López-Gavilán, Mark Markham, Paul Sánchez, and Howard Watkins; and instrumentalists Rachel Barton Pine, Steven Mead, and Adam Walker.

Okpebholo was named the 2024 Chicagoan of the Year in Classical Music by the Chicago Tribune and one of Musical America's Top 30 Professionals of 2023. Also in 2023, his solo album Lord, How Come Me Here?, which reimagines Negro spirituals and American folk hymns, received a Grammy nomination for Best Classical Vocal Solo Album. In 2026, his recording Songs in Flight earned him a second Grammy nomination, this time for Best Contemporary Classical Composition. His chamber opera The Cook-Off, written with Pulitzer Prize–winning librettist Mark Campbell during his residency with Chicago Opera Theater, has been programmed by opera companies nationwide and received its fully-staged world premiere with Nashville Opera. His work has also been featured on PBS NewsHour, NPR's Tiny Desk Concert and Morning Edition, SiriusXM's Living American, and WFMT. His art song "The Rain" was named one of NPR's 100 Best Songs of 2021.

Okpebholo currently serves as the Jonathan Blanchard Distinguished Professor of Composition at Wheaton College Conservatory of Music.

== Personal life ==
Shawn Okpebholo is married to Dorothy Okpebholo, a violinist who is featured on his first album Steal Away. They have two daughters, Eva and Corinne.

== Discography ==
- Songs in Flight (2025), Cedille
- Lord, How Come Me Here? (2022), Navona
- Steal Away (2014)

== Notable students ==
- Elliot Leung
