= Emily D'Angelo =

Canadian opera mezzo-soprano (born 1994)

- Born: September 23, 1994 (age 31); Toronto, Canada
- Genres: Classical
- Occupation: Opera singer
- Instruments: Voice, mezzo-soprano
- Years active: 2011–present
- Label: Deutsche Grammophon
- Website: emilydangelo.com

Emily D'Angelo (born 1994) is a Canadian mezzo-soprano. Since making her debut at 16, D'Angelo's most notable role to date has been singing the lead role in the 2023 opera Grounded.

== Early life and education ==
D'Angelo grew up in a musical family. Her grandmother was a professional pianist, and her parents are both amateur musicians. She sang in the Toronto Children's Chorus and went on international tours with the group. She also played cello. D'Angelo attended University of Toronto, where she graduated with a bachelor's degree in Vocal Performance. She went on to complete a fellowship at the Ravinia Steans Music Institute, which is part of the Ravinia Festival.

D'Angelo won the Canadian Opera Company (COC) Centre Stage Ensemble Studio Competition in 2015. She was awarded both First Prize and the Audience Choice Award. Additionally, she came first at the 2016 Metropolitan Opera National Council Audition Finals.

== Career ==
D'Angelo's debut as a soloist was at age 16 with the Toronto Symphony Orchestra. At the Spoleto Festival dei Due Mondi in 2016, D'angelo made her stage debut as Cherubino in The Marriage of Figaro. In 2017, she was accepted into the Lindemann Young Artist Development Program at the Metropolitan Opera. She made her debut on the stage at the Lincoln Center with the Met in 2018. In 2021, she was signed to Deutsche Grammophon and released an album only featuring songs by women composers. In October of 2023, D'Angelo debuted the role of Jess in the world-premiere of Grounded, an opera by composer Jeanine Tesori and librettist George Brant commissioned by the Metropolitan Opera. The performances were held at the John F. Kennedy Center for the Performing Arts with Washington National Opera. The opera was composed with D'Angelo being specifically chosen by Tesori to perform the role of Jess.

== Recognition ==
She was the first singer to receive the Leonard Bernstein Award from the Schleswig-Holstein Musik Festival. She was the first vocalist ever to receive all four first prizes from the Operalia competition. In 2025, she was awarded the Opus Klassik, Germany's most prestigious prize for classical music, as Singer of the Year for her solo album freezing. In 2026, she was selected by Elton John, the 15th Laureate of the Glenn Gould Prize, as the recipient of the prestigious Glenn Gould Protégé Prize from The Glenn Gould Foundation.

== Discography ==
- Enargeia (Deutsche Grammophon, 2021) - Juno Award for Best Solo Classical Album
- Freezing (Deutsche Grammophon, 2024) - Juno Award for Best Solo Classical Album
- Grounded (Deutsche Grammophon, 2025)
