= Mark Edwards (harpsichordist) =

Canadian harpsichordist and organist (born 1986)

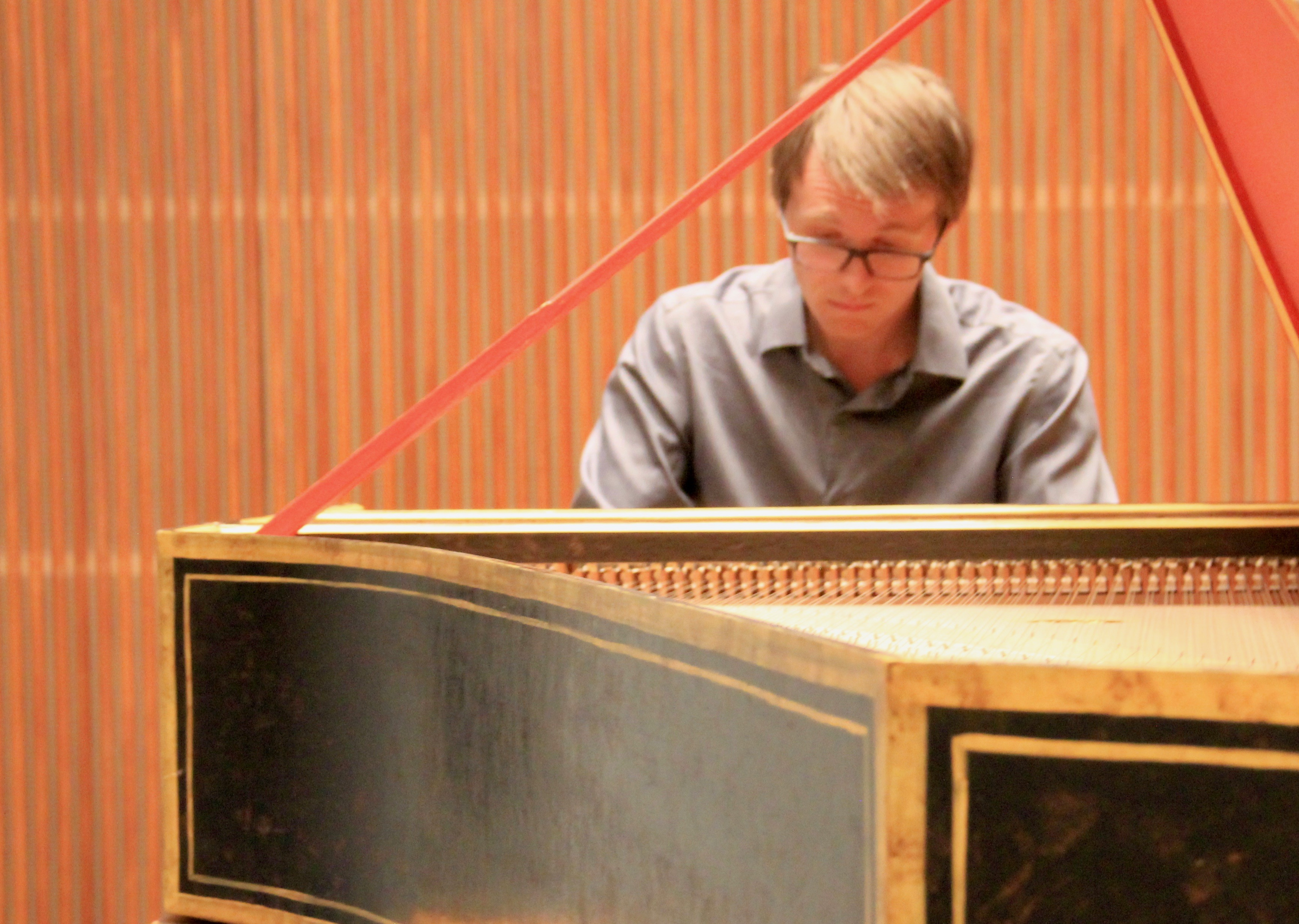
- Edwards performing in 2017
- Born: 1986; Toronto, Canada
- Occupations: Harpsicordist; Organist; Academic teacher
- Organizations: Oberlin Conservatory of Music
- Website: mark-edwards.ca

Mark Edwards (born 1986) is a Canadian harpsichordist and organist from Toronto. He is first-prize winner of the 2012 Musica Antiqua Bruges International Harpsichord Competition and is assistant professor of harpsichord at the Oberlin Conservatory of Music in Ohio.

== Biography ==
Mark Edwards studied piano and organ at the Interlochen Arts Academy in Michigan with Thomas Lymenstull and Thomas Bara. He continued his organ studies with David Higgs at the Eastman School of Music in Rochester, New York, where he also followed courses in organ improvisation and harpsichord with renowned historical keyboards specialist, William Porter. He was organist at the Episcopal Church of the Ascension in Rochester and played continuo at the Eastman School with Paul O'Dette and Christel Thielmann. He graduated as a Bachelor of Music with highest distinction. He completed his further studies with William Porter (organ and improvisation) and Hank Knox (harpsichord) at the Schulich School of Music and the Department of Early Music at McGill University, where in 2011 he obtained Master in organ and harpsichord. He attended master classes with Ton Koopman, Pierre Hantaï, Skip Sempé, Kenneth Weiss, Harald Vogel and Jacques Oortmerssen. In 2012 he continued his studies with Robert Hill at the Hochschule für Musik Freiburg, Germany.

His harpsichord playing has been described in La Libre Belgique as "bringing the listener to new and unpredictable regions, using all of the resources of his instrument, of his virtuosity, and of his imagination [...]."

In addition to his prize at the Bruges competition, Mark won third prize at the 2012 Jurow International Harpsichord Competition, and second prize in the 2011 Concours d'Orgue de Québec. He is also a founding member of Ensemble 1729. He has appeared on American Public Media's radio program Pipedreams, as well as on La Société Radio-Canada's program Soirées classiques.

== Discography ==
=== Solo ===
- Orpheus Descending (2017)

=== Collaborations ===
- Passaggi (2013), with Vincent Lauzer
- Lorenzani: Nicandro e Fileno (2018), with Les Boréades de Montréal
- Devienne Flute Sonatas (2019), with Joanna Marsden
