= Carla Patullo =

American musician

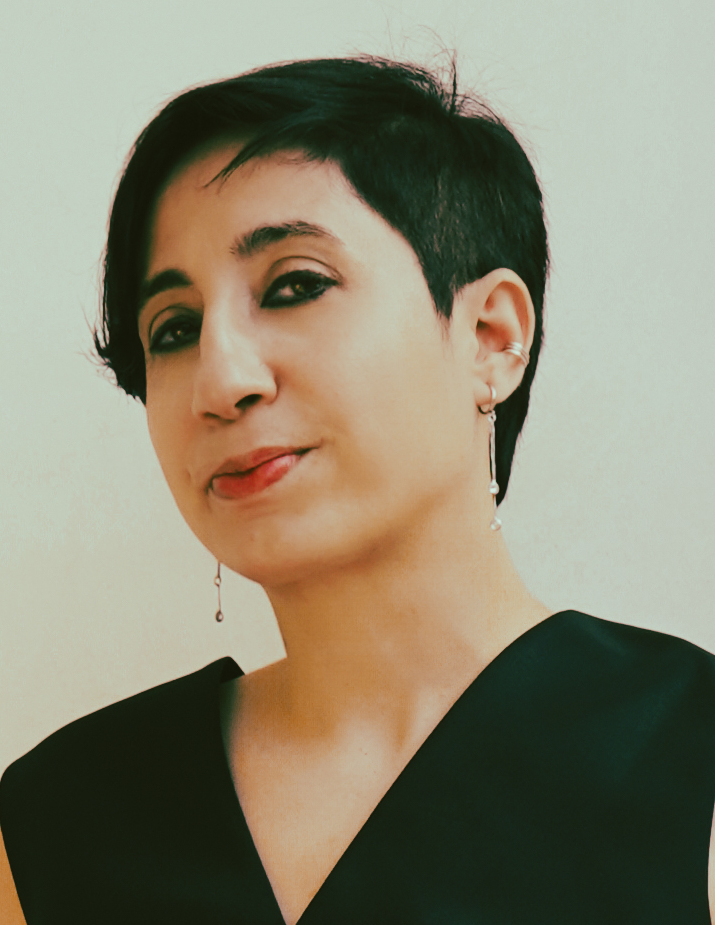
- Patullo in 2025

Background information
- Also known as: White Widow
- Born: Springfield, Massachusetts, United States
- Genres: Experimental; classical; ambient; film score; electronic
- Occupations: Singer; songwriter; film composer; director
- Instruments: Vocals; piano; keyboard
- Years active: 2010–present
- Website: www.carlapatullo.com

Carla Patullo is an American singer, songwriter, film composer, and director. She won Best New Age, Ambient or Chant Album at the 66th Annual Grammy Awards for her debut studio album, So She Howls (2024).

A Berklee College of Music graduate, Patullo created the Soundry, a recording studio and record label, in 2011. She was credited with having composed music for various media, such as Maxine, This is Jessica, and Lotte that Silhouette Girl.

== Early life and education ==
Her grandmother's interest in music and singing influenced her to compose music of her own. She began taking piano and voice lessons as a child and played the saxophone in her high school jazz band. She graduated from Minnechaug Regional High School, received a bachelor's degree in music from the Berklee College of Music, and later studied film, TV, and video game scoring at Berklee's campus in Valencia, Spain where she earned a master's degree in music.

== Career ==
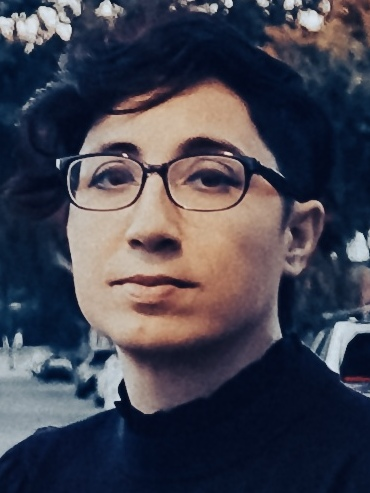
Patullo in 2023

Patullo formed and fronted the band, White Widow while she was in college. They released three studio albums: No Wood to Knock On (2005), Black Heart (2009), and White Widow: A Psychological Thriller (2012). After releasing Black Heart, she signed a publishing deal, which led to their songs being placed in TV shows such as Ellen DeGeneres and the Young and the Restless. Their single, Promises, from their third album, White Widow: A Psychological Thriller, was featured on Dance Moms.

Patullo served as musical director (keyboards, guitar, and vocals) for Sandra Bernhard on her "I Love Being Me, Don't You" and "Kiss Me on the Lips Texas" tours. She is the owner and producer at The Soundry recording studio in Los Angeles, California.

In 2024, Patullo won a Grammy Award for her album, So She Howls, for Best New Age, Ambient, or Chant Album. The album features the vocal ensemble, Tonality, and the Scorchio Quartet led by violist Martha Mooke. Her album Nomadica got a nomination for the 2026 Grammy Award in the Best New Age, Ambient, or Chant Album category.

Patullo has composed music for films, including Maxine, Letter to Anita, L.A.: A Queer History, My Name is Maria De Jesus, Everybody Dies... Sometimes, and others. She cites musical influences such as Laurie Anderson Alexandre Desplat, Ennio Morricone, Danny Elfman, and Thomas Newman.

In 2018, Patullo's animated documentary, Lotte That Silhouette Girl, was a contender for the Academy Awards' short list for "Best Documentary" (Short Subject) in 2018. In that same year, she was selected to participate in the Sundance Institute's Film Music Program at Skywalker Sound where she composed the film score for the horror-comedy Porno, which premiered at SXSW.

== Discography ==
- 2025 - Nomadica
- 2024 - Everybody Dies... Sometimes (soundtrack) - composer
- 2023 - So She Howls
- 2023 - Maxine (soundtrack)
- 2021 - Apotheke (single)
- 2019 - Porno (soundtrack)

== Awards ==
- 2026 - Grammy Award - Nomadica - Best New Age, Ambient, or Chant Album (Winner)
- 2024 - Grammy Award - So She Howls - Best New Age, Ambient, or Chant Album (Winner)
- 2020 - Hollywood Music in Media Award - Everybody Dies...Sometimes - Best Score - Short Film (live action) winner
- 2022 - Hollywood Music in Media Award - Aptoheke - Best Video (independent) winner
- 2018 - AmDoc Film Festival - Lotte That Silhouette Girl - Best Short
- 2021 - Florida Film Festival - Apotheke - Animated Shorts Competition - (nomination)

== Selected filmography ==
- 2024 - Bitterroot - Composer
- 2024 - The Place Between - Composer
- 2023 - Everybody Dies... Sometimes - Composer
- 2023 - Maxine - composer
- 2021 - Ara, untamed - original score
- 2021 - Apotheke - composer
- 2021 - This Is Jessica - composer, performer
- 2021 - L.A.: A Queer History - composer
- 2020 - Worry Dolls - composer
- 2020 - Finjan - composer
- 2020 - Were You Gay in High School? - composer
- 2019 - Porno - Vocalist, Composer
- 2018 - Lotte That Silhouette Girl - orchestrator, songwriter, lead vocalist, sound designer
- 2018 - Choke - composer
- 2017 - Jeanne Cordova: Butches, Lies & Feminism - composer
- 2017 - My Name is Maria De Jesus - Composer (theme music), sound mixer
- 2017 - Pizza Face - Composer
- 2016 - Spa Night - additional music
- 2016 - Teen Titans Go! - songwriter
- 2015 - Clambake - original score
- 2015 - Cheese Dog: The Movie - vocalist, Composer
- 2015 - Cinderella, a Shadow Ballet orchestrator, vocalist
- 2014 - Letter to Anita - Composer
