= George Brant =

American playwright

George Brant is an American playwright. Born in Park Ridge, Illinois, he is the author of several award-winning plays, most notably Grounded.

== Career ==
Brant completed his undergraduate studies at Northwestern University and received his Masters in Fine Arts in Writing from the Michener Center for Writers at the University of Texas at Austin. He is a member of the Dramatists Guild of America.

His most successful play to date is Grounded, which played at London's Gate Theatre and went on to be directed by Julie Taymor in an off-Broadway production at The Public Theater, which starred Anne Hathaway. Grounded won the National New Play Network's 2012 Smith Prize and a Fringe First award at the 2013 Edinburgh Fringe Festival.

In October of 2023, an operatic adaptation of Grounded opened at the Kennedy Center in Washington DC. The Kennedy Center's publicity summarizes the opera as "Jess is a hot shot F-16 fighter pilot, an elite warrior trained for the sky. When an unexpected pregnancy grounds her, she’s reassigned to the “chair force” to control drones in Afghanistan from the comfort of a trailer in Las Vegas. Mezzo-soprano Emily D'Angelo stars as a pilot and mother shaken into a downward spiral as her separation between career and home crumbles. What price is inflicted upon the operator of a lone drone in a blue sky?" The libretto is based on Brant's stage play with music by Jeanine Tesori.

Into the Breeches, Brant's 2018 play, is based on the true story of a playhouse in Cleveland that continued performing during World War Two by having female actors play all the male roles. In reviewing North Coast Rep's 2022 production, the San Diego Union-Tribune wrote "Into the Breeches may be about the can-do spirit of some aspiring thespians 80 years ago, but it’s really a love letter to the boundary-breaking magic of theater and the universality of Shakespeare’s writing."

== Plays ==
- Rust: A Story of Steel and Grit (2025)
- The Land of Oz (2022)
- Tender Age (2021)
- The Prince of Providence (2019)
- Into the Breeches! (2018)
- Dark Room (2018)
- Salvage (2017)
- Marie and Rosetta (2016)
- Good on Paper (2015)
- Grounded (2012). Translated into Spanish as En tierra.
- The Mourners' Bench (2012)
- Three Voyages of the Lobotomobile (2012)
- Grizzly Mama (2011)
- Any Other Name (2009)
- Elephant's Graveyard (2007)
