= Jenn Thompson =

American theater director (born 1967)

- Born: Jenn Thompson; December 13, 1967 (age 58); New York City, U.S.
- Education: Professional Children's School
- Occupations: Director, actor
- Spouse: Stephen Kunken (m. 2005)
- Children: 1
- Parents: Evan Thompson (father); Joan Shepard (mother)
- Relatives: Harlan Thompson (grandfather); Marian Spitzer (grandmother)

Jenn Thompson (born December 13, 1967) is an American stage director. She began her career as a child actor, appearing as Pepper in the original run of Annie on Broadway. As an adult, she later directed three consecutive national tours of the musical between 2022 and 2025, including an engagement at Madison Square Garden starring Whoopi Goldberg as Miss Hannigan.

From 2011 to 2015, Thompsson served as Co-Artistic Director of The Actors Company Theatre, where she directed acclaimed Off-Broadway revivals of Neil Simon's Lost in Yonkers, Tennessee Williams's The Eccentricities of a Nightingale, Alan Ayckbourn's Bedroom Farce, and Beth Henley's Abundance. In 2016, Thompson was nominated for the Drama Desk Award for Outstanding Direction of a Play for staging Hazel Ellis's Women Without Men with Mint Theater Company at New York City Center.

At Goodspeed Opera House, Thompson has directed productions of Gypsy, Anne of Green Gables, The Music Man, Oklahoma!, and Bye Bye Birdie, earning five consecutive nominations for the Connecticut Critics Circle Award for Outstanding Direction of a Musical. Theater critic Terry Teachout of The Wall Street Journal once noted "It's a wonder why Broadway has yet to take note of Ms. Thompson. Nobody in America is staging better revivals of classic musicals."

== Early life and education ==
Thompson was born on December 13, 1967, in New York City to Evan Thompson and Joan Shepard, both veteran stage performers on Broadway. Her grandparents were Harlan Thompson and Marian Spitzer, both prominent playwrights and filmmakers of Classical Hollywood cinema.

Thompson was educated at the Professional Children's School in Manhattan, while simultaneously working as a child actor.

== Career ==
=== Acting ===
Thompson made her Broadway debut in 1977, appearing as Pepper in the original run of Annie at the Neil Simon Theatre. She remained with the company through 1983. From 1980 to 1982, Thompson starred as Dee Johnson on the NBC sitcom Harper Valley, playing the on-screen daughter of Barbara Eden. She later made guest appearances on various televisions series, including CBS Schoolbreak Special (1984), Law & Order (1997), Law & Order: SVU (2002), Ed (2002), and Third Watch (2003). Thompson's work in film included roles in Twelve Months (1980), Little Darlings (1980), Honky Tonk Freeway (1981), and The Out-of-Towners (1999).

In 1991 Thompson appeared Off-Broadway in a new adaption of Mary Shelley's Frankenstein at Soho Rep. She understudied the role of Maria in the 1995 Broadway revival of Ruth Goetz's The Heiress at the James Earl Jones Theatre. She later appeared as Belle in the 1998 Broadway revival of Eugene O'Neill's Ah, Wilderness! at Lincoln Center Theater. In the early 2000s, Thompson joined The Actors Company Theatre, an Off-Broadway troupe dedicated to presenting "rarely produced plays of literary merit." There she appeared in productions of Anita Loos' Happy Birthday (2002), Graham Greene's The Potting Shed (2003), Christopher Durang's The Marriage of Bette and Boo (2003), and Maxwell Anderson's Both Your Houses (2005).

Thompson was a co-founder and later Producing Director of River Rep Theatre Co., a professional theatre in Ivoryton, Connecticut that offered traditional summer-stock for 20 seasons from 1985 to 2005. There Thompson appeared in more than 40 productions as an actor. She later transitioned to directing full-time.

=== Directing ===
Thompson made her Off-Broadway directorial debut with Tennessee Williams' The Eccentricities of a Nightingale, produced by The Actors Company Theatre (TACT) at the Harold Clurman Theater from April 27 – May 24, 2008. The production was named a "Critics' Pick" by The New York Times, and had a sold-out run. Later that same year, Thompson returned to direct Alan Ayckbourn's Bedroom Farce for TACT at the Samuel Beckett Theatre from October 5 – November 8, 2008. The production was also a "Critics' Pick" from The New York Times. In 2009, Thompson directed the world premiere of the musical Seeing Stars at the Theatre At St Clements as part of the New York Musical Theatre Festival. Later that same year, Thompson directed Sidney Howard's The Late Christopher Bean for TACT at the Samuel Beckett Theatre from November 1 – December 12. In 2010, Thompson directed Václav Havel's The Memorandum for TACT at the Samuel Beckett Theatre from October 25 – November 27.

In 2011, Thompson was named Co-Artistic Director of The Actors Company Theatre, joining Simon Jones and Cynthia Harris. That same year, she directed productions of Pamela Gien's The Syringa Tree for Portland Stage Company; Michael Frayn's Noises Off for Dorset Theatre Festival; and Matthew Schneck's The Ping and the Pang for Hartford Stage. In 2012, Thompson directed a much lauded revival of Neil Simon's Pulitzer Prize-winning play Lost in Yonkers for TACT at the Samuel Beckett Theatre from March 13 – April 14. The production was named a "Critics' Pick" by The New York Times, and was nominated for the Drama Desk Award for Outstanding Revival of a Play. Additionally, Thompson was a finalist for the Stage Directors and Choreographers Foundation's Joseph A. Callaway Award for Excellence in Directing. That same year, she directed Holly Webber's Pratfalls for Ground Up Productions at the Dorothy Strelsin Theatre from April 27 – May 19, and Marc Camoletti's Boeing Boeing for Dorset Theatre Festival from July 1 – 28. In 2013, Thompson directed productions of Philip Barry's The Philadelphia Story for Pioneer Theatre Company; Neil Simon's Barefoot in the Park for Dorset Theatre Festival; and Beth Henley's Abundance for Hartford Stage. The latter production earned her a Connecticut Critics Circle Award nomination for Outstanding Direction of a Play.

In 2014, Thompson directed productions of George Brant's Grounded for City Theatre; David Ives' All in the Timing for Dorset Theatre Festival; Christopher Durang's Vanya and Sonia and Masha and Spike for Denver Center Theatre Company; and Rick Elice's Peter and the Starcatcher for Pioneer Theatre Company. In 2015, she directed Beth Henley's Abundance for TACT at the Samuel Beckett Theatre from February 17 – March 28. The production was named a "Critics' Pick" by The New York Times. Later that same year, Thompson directed Neil Simon's Lost in Yonkers for Barrington Stage Company; and Patrick Hamilton's Angel Street for The Repertory Theatre of St. Louis. In 2016, she directed Hazel Ellis' Women Without Men for Mint Theater Company at New York City Center from January 30 – March 26. The production, which featured an all female cast and creative team, received widespread critical acclaim. Women Without Men was nominated for two Lucille Lortel Awards including Outstanding Revival, five Drama Desk Awards including Outstanding Revival of a Play and Outstanding Direction of a Play, and the Off Broadway Alliance Award for Best Play Revival. Later that same year, Thompson directed Tanya Barfield's The Call at TheaterWorks; Nina Raine's Tribes at Barrington Stage Company; and Bye Bye Birdie at Goodspeed Musicals. The later production earned her a Connecticut Critics Circle Award nomination for Outstanding Direction of a Musical.

In 2017, Thompson directed the World Premiere of Jeff Talbott's The Grave Digger's Lullaby for TACT at the Samuel Beckett Theatre from February 28 – April 1. Later that same year, she directed Marsha Norman and Lucy Simon's The Secret Garden for Denver Center Theatre Company; Lauren Gunderson's Miss Bennet: Christmas at Pemberley at The Repertory Theatre of St. Louis; and Rodgers and Hammerstein's Oklahoma! at Goodspeed Musicals, which earned Thompson another Connecticut Critics Circle Award nomination. In 2018, Thompson directed a much lauded production of Miles Malleson's Conflict for Mint Theater Company. The play was named a "Critics' Pick" by The New York Times, and had a sold-out run. That same year, she directed Peter Oswald's Mary Stuart for Chicago Shakespeare Theater. In 2019, Thompson directed Stephen Sondheim and James Lapine's Into the Woods for Hudson Valley Shakespeare Festival, and Meredith Willson's The Music Man at Goodspeed Musicals. Both production shared the distinction of "Best Musical of 2019" from The Wall Street Journal. In 2022, She directed two new musicals: Diary of A Wimpy Kid: The Musical for Children's Theatre Company; and Anne of Green Gables for Goodspeed Musicals. That same year, she directed the Off-Broadway revival of Elizabeth Baker's Chains for Mint Theater Company from June 7 to July 23.

From 2022 to 2023, Thompson directed the National Tour of Annie, which played 44 venues across the United States. Thompson directed additional tours from 2023 to 2024, which played 48 venues; and 2024 to 2025, which played 25 venues, including a month-long engagement at Madison Square Garden, starring Whoopi Goldberg as Miss Hannigan. The production was named a "Critic's Pick" by The New York Times. In 2023, Thompson directed a production of Gypsy at Goodspeed Musicals. In 2024, she directed Sam Shepard's True West at Arizona Theatre Company; and Howard Ashman and Alan Menken's Little Shop of Horrors at South Coast Repertory.

== Personal life ==
Since 2005, Thompson has been married to the actor Stephen Kunken. The couple live in Brooklyn, New York with their daughter.

== Theatre credits ==
Selected credits as director

Year	Title	Playwright	Theatre
2008	The Eccentricities of a Nightingale	Tennessee Williams	The Actors Company Theatre
2008	Bedroom Farce	Alan Ayckbourn	The Actors Company Theatre
2009	The Late Christopher Bean	Sidney Howard	The Actors Company Theatre
2010	The Memorandum	Václav Havel	The Actors Company Theatre
2012	Lost in Yonkers	Neil Simon	The Actors Company Theatre
2013	Abundance	Beth Henley	Hartford Stage
2013	Natural Affection	William Inge	The Actors Company Theatre
2014	Grounded	George Brant	City Theatre
2014	Vanya and Sonia and Masha and Spike	Christopher Durang	Denver Center Theater Company
2015	Abundance	Beth Henley	The Actors Company Theatre
2015	Lost in Yonkers	Neil Simon	Barrington Stage Company
2016	Women Without Men	Hazel Ellis	New York City Center
2016	Bye Bye Birdie	Charles Strouse, Lee Adams, & Michael Stewart	Goodspeed Opera House
2016	The Call	Tanya Barfield	TheaterWorks
2016	Tribes	Nina Raine	Barrington Stage Company
2017	The Grave Digger's Lullaby	Jeff Talbott	The Actors Company Theatre
2017	The Secret Garden	Marsha Norman & Lucy Simon	Denver Center Theater Company
2017	Oklahoma!	Rodgers and Hammerstein	Goodspeed Opera House
2017	Miss Bennet: Christmas at Pemberley	Lauren Gunderson & Margot Melcon	Repertory Theater of St. Louis
2018	Mary Stuart	Friedrich Schiller & Peter Oswald	Chicago Shakespeare Theater
2018	Conflict	Miles Malleson	Mint Theater Company
2019	A Doll's House, Part 2	Lucas Hnath	TheaterWorks
2019	Into the Woods	Stephen Sondheim & James Lapine	Hudson Valley Shakespeare Festival
2019	The Music Man	Meredith Willson	Goodspeed Opera House
2022	Chains	Elizabeth Baker	Mint Theater Company
2022	Anne of Green Gables	Matte O'Brien & Matt Vinson	Goodspeed Opera House
2022-2025	Annie	Charles Strouse, Martin Charnin, & Thomas Meehan	National Tour
2023	Gypsy	Jule Styne, Stephen Sondheim, & Arthur Laurents	Goodspeed Opera House
2024	True West	Sam Shepard	Arizona Theatre Company
2024	Little Shop of Horrors	Alan Menken & Howard Ashman	South Coast Repertory
2024	Annie	Charles Strouse, Martin Charnin, & Thomas Meehan	Madison Square Garden
2026	Les Miserables	Claude-Michel Schönberg & Alain Boublil	Hudson Valley Shakespeare Festival
2026	Annie	Charles Strouse, Martin Charnin, & Thomas Meehan	Goodspeed Opera House

== Awards and nominations ==
Year	Associations	Category	Project	Result	Ref.
2012	Stage Directors & Choreographers Foundation	Joe A. Callaway Award for Excellence in Direction	Lost in Yonkers	Nominated	
2012	Drama Desk Award	Outstanding Revival of a Play	Lost in Yonkers	Nominated	
2013	Connecticut Critics Circle Award	Outstanding Direction of a Play	Abundance	Nominated	
2016	Drama Desk Award	Outstanding Direction of a Play	Women Without Men	Nominated	
2017	Connecticut Critics Circle Award	Outstanding Direction of a Musical	Bye Bye Birdie	Nominated	
2018	Connecticut Critics Circle Award	Outstanding Direction of a Musical	Oklahoma!	Nominated	
2019	Connecticut Critics Circle Award	Outstanding Direction of a Musical	The Music Man	Nominated	
2022	Connecticut Critics Circle Award	Outstanding Direction of a Musical	Anne of Green Gables	Nominated	
2023	Connecticut Critics Circle Award	Outstanding Direction of a Musical	Gypsy	Nominated	
