= Abundance (play) =

Play by Beth Henley

- Promotional poster for Hartford Stage production
- Original language: English
- Written by: Beth Henley
- Characters: Macon Hill; Bess Johnson; Jack Flan; William Curtis; Professor Elmore Crome
- Subject: American frontier, Feminist revisionist mythology
- Genre: Western, Comedy-drama

Premiere
- Date: 24 April 1989
- Place: South Coast Repertory (Los Angeles, CA); Manhattan Theater Club, (New York, NY)

Abundance is a drama by Pulitzer Prize-winning Beth Henley. The play had its world premiere at the South Coast Repertory in Los Angeles in April 1989. This production was directed by Ron Lagomarsino and featured Belita Moreno and O-Lan Jones. The play had its Off-Broadway premiere at Manhattan Theatre Club in October 1990. This production was also directed by Lagomarsino and featured Tony Award-winner Amanda Plummer and Tess Harper.

Abundance was revived Off-Broadway by The Actors Company Theatre in February 2015 to great acclaim. Directed by Jenn Thompson and featuring Tracy Middendorf and Kelly McAndrew, this production was named a "Critics' Pick" by The New York Times and won the Off Broadway Alliance Award for Best Revival.

A "Revisionist Western," the play traces the lives of Macon and Bess, two mail-order brides, over a twenty-five-year journey across the American frontier, celebrating a lifelong friendship resilient enough to endure a kidnapping, a series of extraordinary hardships, and unwanted marriages.

== Characters ==
- Macon Hill
- Bess Johnson
- Jack Flan
- William Curtis
- Professor Elmore Crome

== Plot ==
Set in the Wyoming Territory beginning in the 1860s, Abundance follows two mail-order brides, Macon Hill and Bess Johnson, who travel west to marry men they have never met. The women meet while waiting for their respective husbands and quickly form a close bond, united by their shared hopes for new lives on the frontier. After marriage, they settle on neighboring homesteads, but their expectations of romance and prosperity are undermined by the harsh realities of frontier life. Macon, the more pragmatic and spirited of the two, marries the mild-mannered Will Curtis, while the romantic and idealistic Bess is paired with the domineering and often abusive Jack Flan. Both marriages prove disappointing for the women, marked by hardship and isolation.

As the years pass, the women endure failed crops, poverty and personal losses, and their friendship becomes a source of strength and tension. A turning point occurs when Bess disappears and is presumed to have been abducted while traveling alone. Her absence profoundly affects Macon, who struggles to survive and eventually makes morally compromising choices that strain her loyalty to her friend. Years later, Bess reappears, having survived captivity, and becomes a subject of public fascination. Her story is transformed into a sensational narrative, and she gains financial success by recounting her experiences on the lecture circuit. However, this new found "abundance" proves hollow, as her story is shaped by public expectation rather than truth.

Meanwhile, Macon's life deteriorates as she faces economic hardship and the collapse of her marriage. The contrasting fortunes of the two women create resentment and emotional distance, intensified by revelations of past betrayal. In later years, after Bess's fame declines, the two women reunite. Confronting the passage of time and the consequences of their choices, they reconcile and rediscover the enduring bonds of their friendship. The play concludes with a quiet recognition that, despite the illusions of wealth and grandeur, their relationship remains the most meaningful constant in their lives.

== Production history ==
=== World Premiere (1989) ===
Abundance had its World Premiere at South Coast Repertory in Los Angeles, CA, running from April 21 through May 25, 1989. Directed by Ron Lagomarsino, the cast consisted of Belita Moreno, O-Lan Jones, Bruce Wright, Jimmie Ray Weeks, and John Walcutt. The creative team included Adrianne Lobel (sets), Robert Wojewodski (costumes), Paulie Jenkins (lights), and Michael Roth (original music & sound).

=== Off Broadway (1990) ===
Abundance was produced Off-Broadway by Manhattan Theatre Club at New York City Center from October 4 through November 25, 1990. Directed by Ron Lagomarsino, the cast consisted of Amanda Plummer, Tess Harper, Michael Rooker, Lanny Flaherty, and Keith Reddin. The creative team included Adrianne Lobel (sets), Robert Wojewodski (costumes), Paulie Jenkins (lights), and Michael Roth (original music & sound).

=== Off Broadway Revival (2015) ===
Abundance was revived Off-Broadway by The Actors Company Theatre at the Samuel Beckett Theatre from February 17 through March 28, 2015. Directed by Jenn Thompson, the cast consisted of Tracy Middendorf, Kelly McAndrew, Todd Lawson, Ted Koch, and Jeff Talbott. The creative team included Wilson Chin (sets), Tracy Christensen (costumes), Philip S. Rosenberg (lights), and Toby Jaguar Algya (original music & sound).

== Reception ==
The play's Off-Broadway revival with The Actors Company Theatre received critical acclaim.

Laura Collins-Hughes, in a review from The New York Times, named the play a "Critic's Pick", stating

"The Actors Company Theater's satisfying revival is the sort of production that makes you realize how much you've missed a playwright's voice. Directed by Jenn Thompson on a spare, rough-hewed set by Wilson Chin, it's performed by a fine cast at the Beckett Theater at Theater Row. Set in the second half of the 19th century and written in Ms. Henley's colorfully cockeyed language, Abundance spans 25 years, time enough for the characters to know scarcity and plenty, materially and emotionally... In a genre that tends to shove its few female characters off to the margins, Abundance brings women to the center and gives them heat and light."

TheaterMania praised the production writing,

"The bonds of sisterhood are tested over the course of 25 years in Abundance, a largely forgotten Beth Henley play from 1990 only now receiving its first major New York revival courtesy of the Actors Company Theatre (TACT). In a production as skilled as Jenn Thompson's at the Beckett Theatre, you can't help but wonder why this play so unjustly fell through the cracks. This major rediscovery of a key work by one of America's great writers does the piece a whole lot of justice... How Abundance got lost in the sands of time is anyone's guess. It's a major disappointment that a piece with a wealth of wonderful roles, an equally superb script, and two unapologetically strong female characters would need to be rediscovered by anyone."

David Barbour of Lighting & Sound America was equally effusive, noting

"Abundance looks stronger than it did in its 1990 production at Manhattan Theatre Club, largely because Jenn Thompson manages to emphasize the script's strengths and play down its excesses. Kelly McAndrew's Macon is surprisingly touching in the defiant way she clings to optimism in the face of disaster, until she meets an end not to be described. Given the task of assembling a character who begins as a submissive wife and morphs first into an animal in chains and then a grasping, loveless businesswoman, Tracy Middendorf darn near manages to pull all these identities into a coherent character... Proving especially helpful is the starkly beautiful production design."

== Awards and nominations ==
| Year | Award | Category | Recipient | Result | Ref. |
|---|---|---|---|---|---|
| 2015 | Off-Broadway Alliance Award | Best Revival | The Actors Company Theatre | Won | |
