= Conflict (play) =

Play by Miles Malleson

- Poster for a 2018 production
- Original language: English
- Written by: Miles Malleson
- Characters: Lady Dare Bellingdon; Tom Smith; Sir Ronald Clive; Lord Bellingdon; Mrs. Tremayne; Mrs. Robinson; Daniels

Premiere
- Date: 1925
- Place: London, England

Conflict is a political love story by Miles Malleson. The play premiered in London in 1925 to critical acclaim, and was later adapted into the 1931 British film The Woman Between.

Conflict subsequently went unproduced for nearly a century, eventually having its U.S. Off-Broadway premiere with Mint Theater Company at the Samuel Beckett Theatre. Directed by Jenn Thompson, the cast featured Jessie Shelton, Jeremy Beck, Henry Clarke, Graeme Malcolm, Jasmin Walker, Amelia White, and James Prendergast. The production received widespread acclaim, and was named a "Critic's Pick" by The New York Times.

== Characters ==
- Lady Dare Bellingdon
- Tom Smith
- Sir Ronald Clive
- Lord Bellingdon
- Mrs. Tremayne
- Mrs. Robinson
- Daniels

== Plot ==
Set amidst London's 1925 social season, Conflict centers on Lady Dare Bellingdon, a young debutante living with her aristocratic father, Lord Bellingdon. She is romantically involved with Sir Ronald Clive, a Conservative politician aligned with her father. Despite their long courtship, the match leaves Dare feeling restless and intellectually unfulfilled. Dare's outlook begins to change when she encounters Tom Smith, an earnest and articulate working-class candidate for Parliament representing the Labour Party. Initially dismissive of his politics, Dare becomes increasingly intrigued by Tomy's ideas about social reform, class inequality, and workers' rights. As she spends more time with him, she begins to question her own assumptions about society and her place within it.

The political contest between Ronald and Tom—who are opposing candidates in an election—parallels Dare's personal conflict. Torn between her established life with Ronald and her growing admiration for Tom, she is forced to confront the moral and emotional implications of her choices. Her evolving political consciousness leads her to reassess her loyalties, both romantic and ideological. Ultimately, Dare breaks with Ronald and aligns herself with Tom, signaling both a romantic union and a shift in her political sympathies. The play concludes with her embracing a more socially conscious worldview, suggesting the possibility of personal transformation amid broader societal change.

== Production history ==
=== 2018 Off-Broadway production ===
Mint Theater Company produced the play's U.S. premiere at the Samuel Beckett Theatre, which ran from May 25 through July 21, 2018. Directed by Jenn Thompson, the cast consisted of Jessie Shelton, Jeremy Beck, Henry Clarke, Graeme Malcolm, Jasmin Walker, Amelia White, and James Prendergast. The creative team included John McDermott (sets), Martha Hally (costumes), Mary Louise Geiger (lights), Toby Algya (sound), Chris Fields (props), and Amy Stoller (dialects & dramaturgy).

== Reception ==
=== 2018 Off-Broadway production ===
The play's Off-Broadway premiere received widespread critical acclaim and currently holds a score of 86% on the review aggregator website Show-Score, based on 114 reviews.

Terry Teachout of The Wall Street Journal praised the production, writing

"It is an immaculately well-made, comprehensively satisfying piece of theater, old-fashioned in style without feeling at all dated, and the Mint's production, directed by Jenn Thompson and featuring an ensemble cast of supreme merit, is beyond praise. I'm not surprised—I've reviewed 13 Mint productions since 2005, each one a gem—but it's still worth saying yet again that no New York-based theater company has a better batting average."

Alexis Soloski, in a review from The New York Times, named the play a "Critic's Pick", observing

"This winning two-act play is part romantic comedy and part political drama. Obviously, it's a period piece because when the characters discuss Socialism — which they do, earnestly and often — no one starts trolling them on Twitter. Still, if the settings are fusty, the attitudes aren't... Last year, the Mint produced Malleson's Yours Unfaithfully, a dramedy about an open marriage. Both plays argue for Malleson as a playwright of insight and wit and cool compassion. He is also a writer who takes sex seriously. And it never occurs to him to punish his characters for wanting it and having it. That gets my vote."

Ken Marks of The New Yorker also praised the production writing,

"The conflict at the forefront of this 1925 play by Miles Malleson, receiving an excellent production from the Mint, is a political battle for a seat in Parliament. But Malleson is also exploring friction between classes, lovers, generations, and philosophies, as well as inner conflicts, embodied most tellingly in the character of the aptly named Lady Dare Bellingdon (Jessie Shelton), a young woman suddenly coming to grips with her privileged place in the world. A meeting between two soon-to-be rivals, Ronald Clive (Henry Clarke) and Tom Smith (Jeremy Beck), as directed by Jenn Thompson, is a masterpiece of tension and exposition."

== Awards and nominations ==
Year	Award	Category	Recipient	Result	Ref.
2019	Off-Broadway Alliance Award	Best Revival	Mint Theater Company	Nominated	
