= Chains (play) =

1909 play by Elizabeth Baker

- Written by: Elizabeth Baker
- Characters: Charley Wilson; Alfred Massey; Thomas Fenwick; Maggie Massey; Lily Wilson; Walter Foster; Sybil Frost; Fred Tennant; Mrs. Massey; Percy Massey
- Original language: English
- Subject: Domesticity, marriage, immigration

Premiere
- Date premiered: April, 1909
- Place premiered: Royal Court Theatre, London, England

Chains is a play by the English playwright Elizabeth Baker. It was first performed in April 1909 by the Play Actors Subscription Society at the Court Theatre.

The play explores the lives of the lower middle class who filled up the clerical posts of the office world in Edwardian England. The Wilsons are a young couple who live in the suburbs of London. Charley is a clerk in the City, while Lily is a homemaker. In order to make ends meet, they take in lodgers. Fred Tenant, their present lodger, has decided to abandon his clerical career and emigrate to Australia with what meagre savings he has in order to seek a new life. Charley, who finds life in England narrow and constraining, also wishes to leave. His desire is given added impetus as his company, going through difficult times, has reduced his wages. Practically everyone ridicules Fred Tenant for throwing up a 'good situation', and Charley finds himself alone in his desire to emigrate. His wife, his in-laws, his friends all oppose his wish; only his feisty sister-in-law Maggie can see what grinds him down and supports him. In the end, Fred leaves but Charley fails to do the same as his wife Lily has fallen pregnant. Charley abandons thoughts of Australia, accepts his fate with great bitterness and returns to his clerical job.

The play was Elizabeth Baker's first performed full-length play and was performed just once at the Court Theatre. It was staged the following year at the Duke of York's Theatre and included Sybil Thorndike and Lewis Casson in the cast. It was subsequently produced in Manchester and Birmingham.

Chains was produced for television by ITV as Ticket for Tomorrow in November 1959.

In 2007, the Orange Tree Theatre which specializes in rediscovering long-forgotten classics revived Chains. The cast included Justin Avoth (Charley), Amy Noble (Lily), Ashley George (Fred) and Octavia Walters (Maggie). It was directed by Auriol Smith. Chains played to packed houses and received praise from theatre critics for its minutely-observed realism, for its focus on a little-discussed segment of society, and also for its relationship to the concerns of its present audience.

In 2022 Mint Theater Company produced Chains as the second full production in their "Meet Miss Baker" series which aims to reintroduce Elizabeth Baker to "bring new attention to this long forgotten, much deserving author." Directed by Jenn Thompson, the cast included Jeremy Beck, Kyle Cameron, Anthony Cochrane, Christopher Gerson, Olivia Gilliatt, Jeff Gurner, Laakan McHardy, Andrea Morales, Ned Noyes, Brian Owen, Elisabeth S. Rodgers, Claire Saunders, Peterson Townsend, Amelia White, and Avery Whitted. The Mint's production received critical acclaim, and currently holds a score of 84% of the review aggregator website Show-Score, based on 103 reviews. Charles Isherwood of The Wall Street Journal praised the production as "a gleaming gem, both engrossing and supremely well-acted. What’s more, this 1909 drama about restlessness affecting middle-class men—and women—in Edwardian England proves to have a timely edge."
