= Lovers (play) =

1967 play by Brian Friel

Lovers is a 1967 play written by Irish playwright Brian Friel. Lovers is a play broken into two parts, "Winners" and "Losers".

== Winners ==
The first section of Lovers, titled "Winners" follows the story of two teenage lovers, Joseph Michael Brennan and Margaret Mary Enright – more commonly known as Joe and Mag respectively – who are due to be married in three weeks. However, Mag is also pregnant, which at the time Lovers was written was a major issue. Due to Mag falling pregnant with Joe's baby they are both asked to leave their schools out of disgrace for what they have done. In the play we find out that Joe's mother pleaded with the school to let Joe sit his exams, this is a very important theme as Joe – being the man – is expected to go, find work and provide for his family

The play is set atop hill with the simple premise of Mag and Joe revising for their exams. However, throughout the play they become distracted and talk on different subjects (much to Joe's annoyance) and through this we hear the further back story behind the characters.

The play ends with Mag and Joe finding a boat on the shore by a lake and deciding to take it out onto the lake. It is hinted by the narrators ("Man" and "Woman") during the play that Mag and Joe die at the end. This is found true when it turns out that both Lovers drowned. Whether this is an accident or murder or a suicide is not stated in the play.

== Losers ==
Losers is a play about middle aged lovers, Hanna and Andy, who are trying to make a relationship while having Hanna's mother, Mrs Wilson, and Cissy, next door neighbour, watching them constantly. Mrs Wilson and Cissy are very Catholic and do not think it is appropriate for Hanna's and Andy's relationship to continue. Mrs Wilson tries to break up their relationship by constantly ringing her bell, and wanting prayers. Towards the end of the play Andy comes home drunk and taunts Mrs Wilson and Cissy that their "Heads a marly" – a reference to the Saint Philomena whom Mrs Wilson is devout to. With this action Hanna proclaims "you'll regret this day Andy Tracey, you'll regret this day as long as you live". In the end Andy and Hanna are still together. However, they are stuck in a loveless marriage – divorce was prohibited in the Republic of Ireland at the time – making them the Losers of the play.

== Productions ==
Lovers premiered at the Gate Theatre, Dublin Ireland in 1967. The play was subsequently produced on Broadway at Vivian Beaumont Theatre (7/25/1968 - 11/30/1968) and then The Music Box Theatre (9/17/1968 - 11/30/1968). The production starred Art Carney, Anna Manahan, Fionnula Flanagan, Eamon Morrissey, Beulah Garrick and Grania O'Malley. The understudies were Blythe Danner and Vincent Dowling. The production was directed by Hilton Edwards with by Scenic Design by William Ritman; Costume Design by Noel Taylor; Lighting Design by Tharon Musser.

Lovers received its second professional New York production in 2012, this time Off-Broadway by The Actors Company Theatre. The cast was James Riordan, Kati Brazda, Cameron Scoggins, Cynthia Darlow, Justine Salata, and Nora Chester.

Terry Teachout of The Wall Street Journal reviewing the 2012 revival wrote "If life were fair, Brian Friel, the foremost living playwright in the English-speaking world, would have won a Nobel Prize long ago. All you see in Lovers are Mr. Friel's small-town characters, realized so fully (by Mr. Riordan and Ms. Salata in particular) that they give the impression of having been played by ordinary people ... Like Horton Foote and August Wilson, he takes everyday speech and turns it into something not too far removed from poetry. He has a great ear — and a great heart." The New York Times assessed the revival to be "expertly acted" and wrote "Mr. Friel explores what is unsaid, hauntingly. Even his minor works, like Lovers, hold magic."
