= Jonathan Spector (playwright) =

American playwright

- Education: New College of Florida (BA); San Francisco State University (MFA)
- Occupation: Playwright
- Awards: Tony Award for Best Revival of a Play

Jonathan Spector is an American playwright whose plays include Eureka Day and This Much I Know the former of which won him the 2025 Tony Award for Best Revival of a Play.

== Career ==
Spector received his Master of Fine Arts in playwriting from San Francisco State University. Prior to becoming a playwright, he worked as the Literary Manager and Associate Artistic Director at Playwrights Foundation in San Francisco from 2006 to 2010.

Spector's first play produced was In From The Cold at Just Theater in Berkeley, California, in November, 2014. In June 2018 Good. Better. Best. Bested. premiered at Custom Made Theatre Company in San Francisco, California.

Later that year, his most notable work, Eureka Day, premiered at Aurora Theatre Company in Berkeley, California. The production followed the parents of students at the titular school arguing over vaccine mandates. The Broadway production of Eureka Day premiered in 2024 and received critical acclaim, with The New York Times calling it a "hilarious poison-pen satire of educational wokeism" and Variety praising it as "a cleverly staged social satire." It won the 2025 Tony Award for Best Revival of a Play. It also received a Drama Desk Award and a Drama League Award, both for Outstanding Revival of a Play in 2025.

Other plays by Spector include This Much I Know, which premiered in 2022 at Aurora Theatre Company, and was later produced at The Hampstead Theater in London in 2023, and Off Broadway at 59E59 Theater in 2025, Best Available, which premiered in 2024 at Shotgun Theatre Company.

In 2026, his play Birthright premiered at MCC Theater. The play follows six friends who meet on a birthright trip to Israel and their evolving faiths and beliefs in Judaism. Directed by Teddy Bergman, the production received critical acclaim, with The New York Times lauding it as "a thrillingly constructed drama," and The Wrap calling it the "best new play of the year." The show opened on June 29, 2026 and extended through August 23, 2026.

== Personal life ==
As of July 2026, Spector was currently based in Oakland, California.

== Works ==
- Siesta Key (2017)
- Good. Better. Best. Bested. (2018)
- Eureka Day (2018)
- This Much I Know (2022)
- Best Available (2024)
- Birthright (2026)

== Awards and nominations ==
Year	Award	Category	Work	Result	Ref.
2022	Edgerton Foundation Award	New Play Award	This Much I Know	Honored	
2025	Tony Award	Best Revival of a Play	Eureka Day	Won	
2025	Drama Desk Award	Outstanding Revival of a Play	Eureka Day	Won	
2025	Drama League Award	Outstanding Revival of a Play	Eureka Day	Won	
2025	Dorian Award	Outstanding Broadway Play Revival	Eureka Day	Won	
