= Lost in Yonkers =

Play by Neil Simon

- Original Broadway poster
- Original language: English
- Written by: Neil Simon
- Characters: Jay; Bella; Louie; Grandma; Eddie; Arty; Gert
- Genre: Comic drama
- Setting: An apartment in Yonkers, New York, 1942

Premiere
- Date: December 31, 1990
- Place: The Center for the Performing Arts; Winston-Salem, North Carolina

Lost in Yonkers is a play by Neil Simon. The play won the 1991 Pulitzer Prize for Drama.

== Production ==
The play premiered at The Center for the Performing Arts in Winston-Salem, North Carolina, on December 31, 1990, then moved to Broadway at the Richard Rodgers Theatre on February 21, 1991, where it ran for 780 performances and 11 previews. Produced by Emanuel Azenberg and directed by Gene Saks, the cast included Jamie Marsh as Jay, Irene Worth as Grandma, Mercedes Ruehl as Bella, Kevin Spacey as Louie, Lauren Klein as Gert, Danny Gerard as Arty, and Mark Blum as Eddie.

Lost in Yonkers was revived Off-Broadway by The Actors Company Theatre at the Samuel Beckett Theatre from March 13 – April 14, 2012. The revival was directed by Jenn Thompson, the cast included Matthew Gumley as Jay, Cynthia Harris as Grandma, Finnerty Steeves as Bella, Alec Beard as Louie, Stephanie Cozart as Gert, Russell Posner as Arty, and Dominic Comperatore as Eddie. The production was named a "Critics' Pick" by The New York Times, and was nominated for the Drama Desk Award for Outstanding Revival of a Play.

== Plot ==
In Brooklyn in 1942, Evelyn Kurnitz has just died following a lengthy illness. Her husband, Eddie Kurnitz, needs to take a job as a traveling salesman to pay the medical bills incurred, so he decides to ask his stern and straight-talking mother (from whom he is slightly estranged) if his two early-teen sons, Jay and Arty (whom she insists on calling by their full given names, Jacob and Arthur, which she pronounces "Yakob" and "Artur"), can live with her and their Aunt Bella Kurnitz in Yonkers. She refuses. After a threat by Bella, she lets them stay without ever saying they could stay. Despite their grandmother owning and operating a candy store, Jay and Arty do not like their new living situation. They are afraid of their grandmother and find it difficult to relate to their crazy Aunt Bella, whose slow mental state is manifested by perpetual excitability and a short attention span, which outwardly comes across as a childlike demeanor.

Into their collective lives returns one of Eddie and Bella's other siblings, Louie Kurnitz, a henchman for some gangsters. He is hiding out from Hollywood Harry, who wants what Louie stole and is hiding in his small black bag. Jay and Arty's mission becomes how to make money fast so that they can help their father and move back in together, which may entail stealing the $15,000 their grandmother has hidden somewhere. Bella's mission is to find a way to tell the family that she wants to marry Johnny, her equally slow movie theater usher boyfriend; the two could also use $5,000 of Grandma's hidden money to open their dream restaurant. And Louie's mission is to survive the next couple of days.

== Characters ==
Jay: He is fifteen "and a half" years old. He insists on the "and a half". The death of his mother forces him to be more mature than he is ready to be when his father leaves him and his younger brother with his family so he can sell scrap iron during World War Two. The play tells his coming-of-age story.

Arty: Jay's younger brother, he is 13 "and a half" years old. More of an observer than the rest of his family, he often goes with the flow of things, but also can be a little childish.

Bella: Jay's aunt, late 30's to early 40's. She is sometimes a bit off-center and is mentally challenged, but despite this she is also loving and protective of her nephews. Much of the second half of the play focuses on her attempts at independence from her stern mother.

Louie: Jay's flamboyant, jovial uncle, in his late 30s, who comes to live with the family when he is hiding from the local mob. He is considered by Grandma Kurnitz to be the "survivor" of the family. He has a strong, mercurial nature, and a certain underlying dark side, which the kids uncover in the second act of the play. He works as a "bag-man" for the mob.

Grandma Kurnitz: Jay's grandmother. A very old and stern woman, an immigrant from Germany. Owing to her harsh childhood, she has always been very intolerant of what in others she calls "weaknesses". She is blunt, sometimes even in a funny way, and always knows what is going on with the people around her.

Eddie: Jay's middle-aged father. After the death of his wife, he is forced to send his two sons to live with their grandmother, while he repays his large financial debts. He is shown to be, much like his sisters, a nervous wreck around Grandma.

Gert: Jay's aunt, and Grandma's daughter. Her most noticeable issue is that when she breathes she has a tendency to suck in while still speaking, as a result of trauma instilled in her by Mother, from a young age.

== Film adaptation ==
Simon adapted his play for a 1993 feature film directed by Martha Coolidge, and starring Brad Stoll as Jay. Worth and Ruehl reprised their stage roles, and Richard Dreyfuss was cast as Louie. Bella's beau Johnny, an unseen character in the play, was portrayed by David Strathairn.

== Awards and nominations ==
Source: Playbill Vault

Awards

- Drama Desk Award for Outstanding Actress in a Play (Mercedes Ruehl)
- Drama Desk Award for Outstanding Featured Actor in a Play (Kevin Spacey)
- Drama Desk Award for Outstanding Featured Actress in a Play (Irene Worth)
- Drama Desk Award for Outstanding Play
- Pulitzer Prize for Drama
- Tony Award for Best Actress in a Play (Mercedes Ruehl)
- Tony Award for Best Featured Actor in a Play (Kevin Spacey)
- Tony Award for Best Featured Actress in a Play (Irene Worth)
- Tony Award for Best Play

Nominations

- Tony Award for Best Direction of a Play (Gene Saks)
- Drama Desk Award for Outstanding Costume Design (Santo Loquasto)
