= Summer and Smoke =

Play by Tennessee Williams

- Print edition
- Original language: English
- Written by: Tennessee Williams
- Characters: Alma Winemiller; John Buchanan Jr.; Reverend Winemiller; Mrs. Winemiller; Dr. Buchanan
- Genre: Southern gothic, drama
- Setting: Glorious Hill, Mississippi

Premiere
- Date: October 6, 1948
- Place: Music Box Theatre; New York, N.Y.

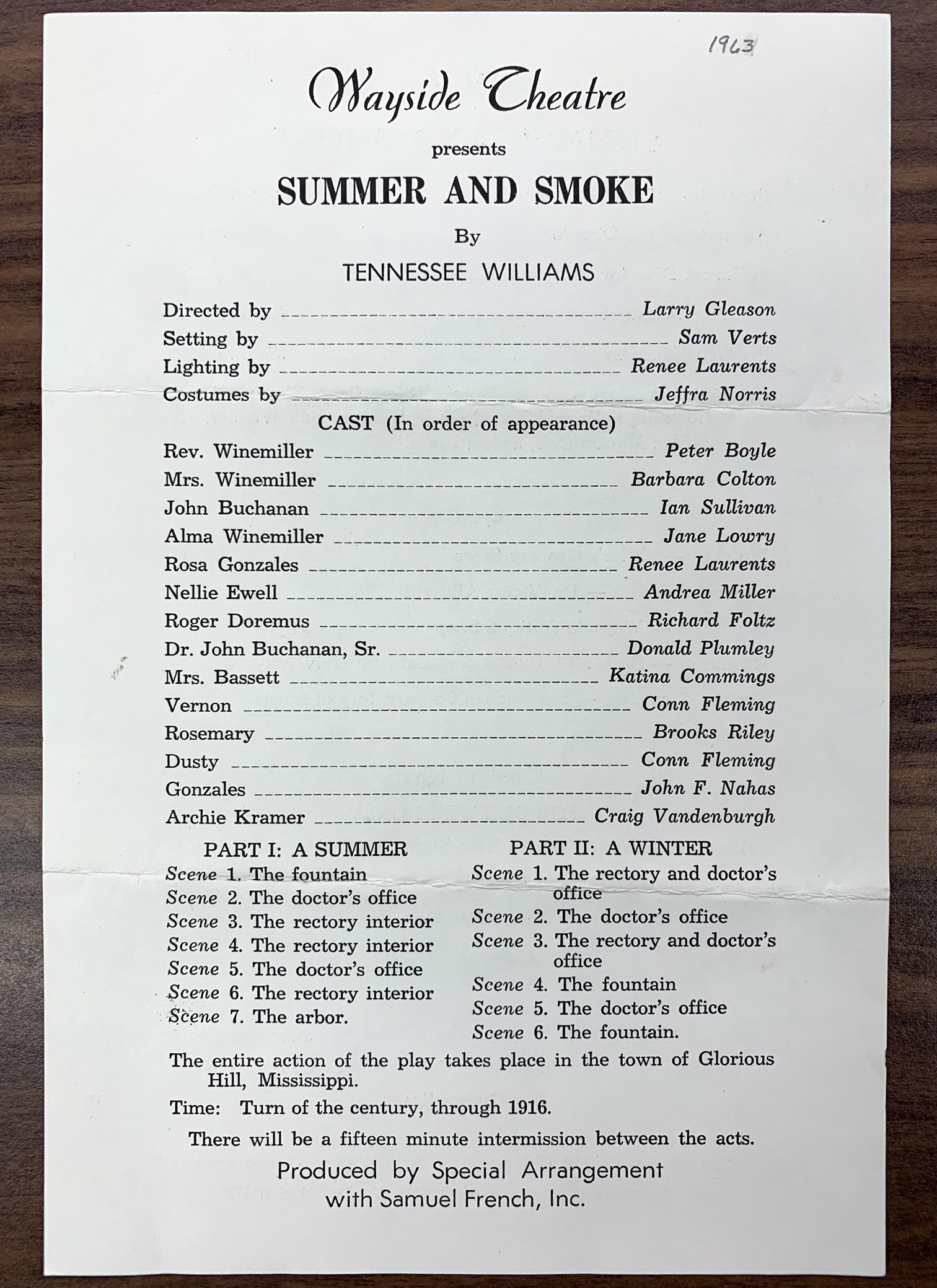
Programme for a 1963 production at the Wayside Theatre, Virginia; Peter Boyle played the Rev. Winemiller.

Summer and Smoke is a two-part, thirteen-scene play by Tennessee Williams, completed in 1948. He began working on the play in 1945 as Chart of Anatomy, derived from his short stories "Oriflamme" and "Yellow Bird", the latter still a work-in-progress. The phrase "summer and smoke" probably comes from the Hart Crane poem "Emblems of Conduct" in the 1926 collection White Buildings. After a disappointing Broadway run in 1948, the play was a hit Off-Broadway in 1952. Williams continued to revise Summer and Smoke in the 1950s, and in 1964 he rewrote the play as The Eccentricities of a Nightingale.

== Synopsis ==
Summer and Smoke is set in Glorious Hill, Mississippi, from the "turn of the century through 1916", and centers on Alma Winemiller, a highly strung, unmarried minister's daughter, and the spiritual romance that nearly blossoms between her and John Buchanan Jr., a young doctor who grew up next door. She, ineffably refined, identifies with the Gothic cathedral, "reaching up to something beyond attainment"; her name, as Williams makes clear during the play, means "soul" in Spanish; by contrast Buchanan, a doctor and sensualist, defies her with the soulless anatomy chart.

By the play's end, Buchanan and Alma have traded places philosophically. She has been transformed. She throws herself at him, saying "she doesn't exist any more, she died last summer — suffocated in smoke from something on fire inside her". But he has changed, he is engaged to marry a respectable, younger girl, and as he tries to convince Alma that their relationship was indeed a "spiritual bond", she realizes that it is too late to rescue it. In the final scene, Alma accosts a young traveling salesman in the park and follows him to enjoy the entertainment at Moon Lake Casino.

== Production history ==
On 6 October 1948, after an opening run in Dallas, Texas, Summer and Smoke received its first Broadway performance at the Music Box Theatre in New York City in a production staged by Margo Jones and designed by Jo Mielziner with Tod Andrews, Margaret Phillips, Monica Boyar and Anne Jackson. The play ran for 102 performances and, at the time, represented a comparative failure for Williams following his success with A Streetcar Named Desire. The play was produced in London in 1951, first at the Lyric Theatre, Hammersmith, and then in the West End at the Duchess Theatre.

In 1952, Geraldine Page played the lead role in a revival directed by José Quintero at the newly founded Circle in the Square Theatre, which was then in its Sheridan Square location in lower Manhattan. Her performance has been credited with helping to launch the Off-Broadway movement, putting both herself and Quintero on the map and vindicating the play. In 1953, Page starred opposite Richard Kiley in an hour-long adaptation of the play on the radio series Best Plays, recordings of which still exist. She also portrayed Alma Winemiller in the 1961 film opposite Laurence Harvey, earning an Academy Award nomination, as did Una Merkel playing her mother. Additional Oscar nominations went to the Art Direction and Elmer Bernstein's evocative musical score. In 1963, Peter Boyle starred in the play during the opening season of Wayside Theatre.

Williams was unsatisfied with the play and created a new version, called The Eccentricities of a Nightingale, in 1951. However, this went unproduced until 1976, when a television version starring Blythe Danner and Frank Langella appeared on WNET's Theater in America. Its Broadway premiere followed later that year. The production was directed by Edwin Sherin, with scenery by William Ritman, costumes by Theoni V. Aldredge, lighting by Marc B. Weiss and original music by Charles Gross. It was produced in conjunction with Marc W. Jacobs. The production stage manager was Henry Banister and press was by Seymour Krawitz, Patricia McLean Krawitz and Louise Ment. The show starred Betsy Palmer (Alma), Shepperd Strudwick (Rev. Winemiller), Grace Carney (Mrs. Winemiller), Nan Martin (Mrs. Buchanan), Peter Blaxill (Roger Doremus), Jen Jones (Mrs. Bassett), Patricia Guinan (Rosemary), W.P. Dremak (Vernon), Thomas Stechschulte (Traveling Salesman) and David Selby (Dr. Buchanan). The production ran for 24 performances at the Morosco Theatre.

In 1991, Gilles Gleizes translated into French, with Roberta Bailey, Summer and Smoke, and directed the play in France, Théâtre de Rungis et CDN de Limoges.

In 1996, the play was revived at the Criterion Center Stage Right in New York, in a production directed by David Warren, with Harry Hamlin and Mary McDonnell.

Olga Bellin, Laila Robins and Amanda Plummer have been notable Almas in regional productions.

A West End revival opened at the Apollo Theatre on 17 October 2006. The production, directed by Adrian Noble, and starring Rosamund Pike and Chris Carmack, opened at the Nottingham Playhouse in September and then transferred to London. It closed 10 weeks short of its planned 16-week run due to disappointing ticket sales.

In January 2007, the Paper Mill Playhouse in Millburn, New Jersey, presented a revival starring Amanda Plummer and Kevin Anderson, directed by Michael Wilson.

In May 2008, The Actors Company Theatre presented an Off-Broadway revival of the 1964 revision of the play, titled The Eccentricities of a Nightingale at the Harold Clurman Theater. Directed by Jenn Thompson, the cast featured Larry Keith, Mary Bacon, and Cynthia Darlow. The production was named a "Critics' Pick" by The New York Times.

In 2017, the Almeida Theatre announced a new production starring Patsy Ferran, directed by Rebecca Frecknall and designed by Tom Scutt. After a successful run and several five-star reviews, the production was transferred to the Duke of York's Theatre.

The play returned to Off-Broadway in the spring of 2018. It was performed by the Classic Stage Company, with Nathan Darrow and Marin Ireland in the lead roles. It was directed by Jack Cummings III.

== Adaptations ==
In 1961, a film adaptation by Paramount Pictures was directed by Peter Glenville, and starred Laurence Harvey, Rita Moreno, and Geraldine Page reprising her role as Alma. A television version was produced in 1972, starring Lee Remick, David Hedison, and Barry Morse. An operatic treatment of the play exists as well, composed by Lee Hoiby. It was first produced by the Minnesota Opera in 1971 and came to New York City Opera the following year. It was presented at Manhattan School of Music Opera Theater in December 2010 and at Converse College Opera Theatre in January 2018.
