= Women Without Men (play) =

Play by Hazel Ellis

- Original language: English
- Written by: Hazel Ellis
- Characters: Miss Marjorie Strong; Miss Ruby Ridgeway; Mademoiselle Vernier; Mrs. Newcome; Miss Jean Wade; Miss Connor; Miss Margaret Willoughby; Mrs. Hubbert; Phyllis Conway; Dorothy Benson; Peggy Summers

Premiere
- Date: 15 November 1938
- Place: Gate Theatre, Dublin, Ireland

Women Without Men is the first play by Hazel Ellis. The play premiered in November of 1938 at the Gate Theatre in Dublin, directed by Hilton Edwards.

The play was revived Off-Broadway in 2016 by Mint Theater Company at New York City Center to critical acclaim. Directed by Jenn Thompson, the production was nominated for five Drama Desk Awards, including Outstanding Revival of a Play, as well as the Lucille Lortel Award for Outstanding Revival.

== Characters ==
- Miss Marjorie Strong
- Miss Ruby Ridgeway
- Mademoiselle Vernier
- Mrs. Newcome
- Miss Jean Wade
- Miss Connor
- Miss Margaret Willoughby
- Mrs. Hubbert
- Phyllis Conway
- Dorothy Benson
- Peggy Summers

== Plot ==
Women Without Men is set in the teachers’ lounge of a private girls’ boarding school in Ireland in the late 1930s, where an all-female staff lives and works in a tightly controlled, insular environment. The play follows the arrival of a new, idealistic teacher, Jean Wade, whose presence unsettles the fragile social order among her colleagues. Within the confined space of the staff room, the women’s daily routines expose simmering rivalries, insecurities, and emotional frustrations shaped by limited opportunities and rigid social expectations. Petty grievances and shifting alliances dominate their interactions, revealing a culture of suspicion and competitiveness rather than solidarity.

Tensions escalate when a manuscript belonging to the domineering Miss Connor—her life’s work documenting exemplary moral deeds—is mysteriously destroyed. Suspicion falls on Jean, placing her at the center of a conflict that exposes the underlying resentments and moral hypocrisies of the group. As accusations intensify, the play blends social realism with elements of melodrama, culminating in a crisis that forces the women to confront their own pettiness, ambitions, and emotional isolation. Ultimately, the drama presents a critical portrait of institutional life and the constrained roles available to women, emphasizing how repression and lack of autonomy foster division rather than mutual support.

== Production history ==
=== Gate Theatre ===
Women without Men premiered on November 15th, 1938 at the Gate Theatre in Dublin, directed by Hilton Edwards. The cast consisted of Sally Travers, Evelyn Lund, Peggy Cummins, Grace Crotty, Jean St. Claire, Truda Barling, Máirín Hayes, May Carey, Meriel Moore, and Mary Maloney. The creative team included Molly McEwen (sets), Christina Keely (costumes), Frank McEnhill (lights), and Margaret McNamee (original music and sound).

=== Mint Theater Company ===
Mint Theater Company revived the play at New York City Center January 30th through March 26th, 2016 to critical acclaim. Directed by Jenn Thompson, the cast consisted of Mary Bacon, Joyce Cohen, Shannon Harrington, Kate Middleton, Aedin Moloney, Alexa Shae Niziak, Kellie Overbey, Dee Pelletier, Beatrice Tulchin, Emily Walton, and Amelia White. The creative team included Vicki R. Davis (sets), Martha Hally (costumes), Traci Klainer Polimeni (lights), Jane Shaw (original music and sound), Joshua Yocom (props), Robert-Charles Vallance (hair and wigs), and Amy Stoller (dialects & dramaturgy).

== Reception ==
The plays Off-broadway revival received critical acclaim and currently holds a score of 82% on the review aggregator Show-Score, based on 73 reviews. The "Goings On About Town" section of The New Yorker praised the production writing,

"Featuring an all-female cast of eleven, the impressive ensemble piece is set in a posh private girls’ school. All the action takes place in the teachers’ lounge—perfect for dramatic entrances and sullen exits. In the school’s insular, highly regulated environment, the teaching staff are all leading lives of not so quiet desperation, and petty jealousies sometimes lead to serious insults. The plot, especially in the second act, tends toward melodrama, but the Mint’s uniformly fine players, directed by Jenn Thompson, get to sink their teeth into a range of juicy character roles."

Marilyn Stasio of Variety was equally effusive, noting

"Overbey and Walton put their hearts into this juicy contretemps. But there’s absolutely no grandstanding in director Jenn Thompson’s beautifully composed ensemble piece. Individually, the performances are distinctive, but the collective work of the company is even more impressive. Ellis’ voice is as tart as her wit, and the players clearly relish the surprisingly contemporary tone of an 80-year-old period play."

In a more mixed review from The New York Times, Alexis Soloski observed

"This 1938 play, which the Mint has resurrected under Jenn Thompson’s direction, is a mostly sturdy and occasionally creaky construction about the perils of a circumscribed life...Ellis, an Irish playwright, is expert in depicting the minutiae of relations among the women, the use of pet names without pet feelings, the flimsy loyalties and jealousies...The acting is generally skillful, though the three younger actresses playing schoolgirls don’t yet seem quite at home in this world."

== Awards and nominations ==
Year	Award	Category	Recipient	Result	Ref.
2016	Drama Desk Award	Outstanding Revival of a Play	Mint Theater Company	Nominated	
2016	Drama Desk Award	Outstanding Director of a Play	Jenn Thompson	Nominated	
2016	Drama Desk Award	Outstanding Featured Actress in a Play	Kellie Overbey	Nominated	
2016	Drama Desk Award	Outstanding Costume Design	Martha Hally	Nominated	
2016	Drama Desk Award	Outstanding Wig and Hair Design	Robert-Charles Vallance	Nominated	
2016	Lucille Lortel Award	Outstanding Revival	Mint Theater Company	Nominated	
2016	Lucille Lortel Award	Outstanding Costume Design	Martha Hally	Nominated	
2016	Off-Broadway Alliance Award	Best Revival	Mint Theater Company	Nominated	
2016	Henry Hewes Award	Best Costume Design	Martha Hally	Nominated	
