= Bedroom Farce (play) =

Play by Alan Ayckbourn

- Written by: Alan Ayckbourn
- Characters: Delia; Ernest; Malcolm; Kate; Jan; Nick; Susannah; Trevor
- Original language: English
- Genre: Bedroom farce
- Setting: Three bedrooms

Premiere
- Date premiered: 16 June 1975
- Place premiered: The Library Theatre, Scarborough, United Kingdom

Bedroom Farce is a 1975 play by British playwright Alan Ayckbourn. It had a London production at the National Theatre in 1977, transferring subsequently to the Prince of Wales Theatre.

== Plot summary ==
The play takes place in three bedrooms during one night and the following morning. The cast consists of four married couples. At the beginning of the play, the oldest couple, Delia and Ernest, are getting ready to go out for a meal to celebrate their wedding anniversary; Malcolm and Kate, the youngest, are about to host a housewarming party, to which the other two couples, Jan and Nick and Susannah and Trevor (the only ones whose bedroom is not seen), have been invited. At the last minute Nick has hurt his back and is unable to go. The complicating factor is that Jan used to be Trevor's girlfriend, and after Susannah and Trevor have a blazing row, Susannah finds Trevor kissing Jan. As a result Susannah leaves the party and goes to visit Delia and Ernest, whose connection with the rest of the plot is that they are Trevor's parents; she ends up sharing Delia's bed, while Ernest is forced to sleep in the spare room. Meanwhile Trevor himself, feeling unable to go home, is also offered a bed in a spare room by Kate, but decides to go and "straighten things out" with Nick and Jan, leaving Kate waiting up for him. Eventually Trevor and Susannah seem to be reconciled.

== Awards and nominations ==
- 1979 Selection, The Burns Mantle Theater Yearbook, The Best Plays of 1978-1979

== Major revivals ==
The play was revived in the West End in 2002 with a cast including June Whitfield and Richard Briers.

In 2008, the play was revived Off-Broadway by The Actors Company Theatre. Directed by Jenn Thompson, the cast included Cynthia Harris and Larry Keith. The production was named a "Critics' Pick" by The New York Times.

In 2009, the play was revived at the Rose Theatre by Peter Hall, co-director of the original London production in 1977.

In 2013, the play was revived at the Gate Theatre, Dublin.

In 2016 the play had a brief run at the Gordon Craig Theatre in Stevenage and starred Paul Lavers, Érin Geraghty and Gemma Oaten.

== In other media ==
- The play was adapted for television in the UK in 1980, Ayckbourn himself writing the screenplay. The cast included Michael Denison, Joan Hickson, Brenda Blethyn, and Stephen Moore.
- It was broadcast in two parts on BBC Radio 4 in 2022–2023. The cast was Stephen Mangan, Susannah Fielding, George Blagden, Laura Pitt-Pulford, Lisa Dillon, Edward Bennett, Rosalind Ayres and Martin Jarvis, who also directed.
