= Larry Keith =

American actor

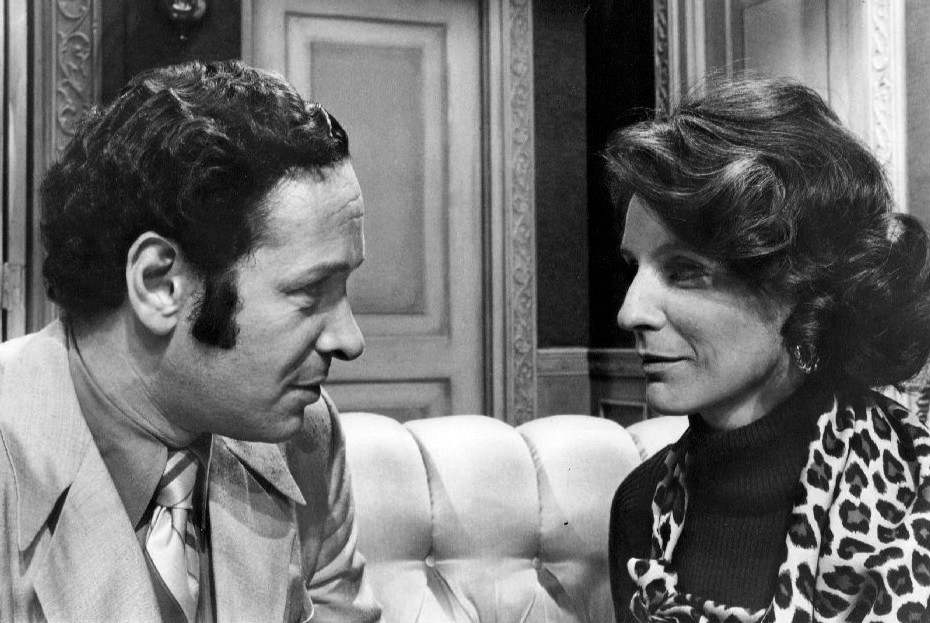
- Keith and Joanna Miles in All My Children, 1972.
- Born: Lawrence Jay Korn; March 4, 1931; Brooklyn, New York City, U.S.
- Died: July 17, 2010 (aged 79); Manhattan, New York City, U.S.
- Occupation: Actor
- Years active: 1967–2010

Larry Keith (born Lawrence Jay Korn; March 4, 1931 – July 17, 2010) was an American television actor. He was best known for being a cast member on the ABC soap opera All My Children and was the first American to play the role of Henry Higgins in the Broadway production of My Fair Lady.

He was born on March 4, 1931, in Brooklyn and adopted his stage name when he started acting. His early training was as a singer, and he earned a Bachelor of Music degree from Brooklyn College. He was drafted while he was a graduate student in music at Indiana University Bloomington and spent his time in the United States Army performing in shows for troops stationed in South Korea.

In the 1961 Broadway production of My Fair Lady, Keith served as an understudy to Michael Allinson and played the role of Higgins some 50 times. In an interview with the New York Herald Tribune before his first stage appearance as Higgins, Keith said he doubted that he could get away with a plummy British accent in England, "but I think I can in New York". In 1992, Keith was one of the founders of TACT (The Actors Company Theatre), which has the mission of presenting "neglected or rarely produced plays of literary merit", appearing in its productions of Eccentricities of a Nightingale and Bedroom Farce. Keith also appeared on Broadway in Titanic in 1997 in the role of Macy's owner Isidor Straus who sang the song Still to his wife Ida as the boat was sinking into the ocean. In Caroline, or Change in 2004, Keith played the role of Mr. Stopnick.

He played the role of restaurateur Nick Davis on All My Children, appearing regularly from its inception in 1970 until 1978 and then made guest appearances in that role in the ensuing years. He appeared in television in Damages and several times on Law & Order.

A resident of Manhattan, Keith died there on July 17, 2010, due to complications from lung cancer. He was survived by his ex-wife, the former Mina Wagman, as well as by a daughter and a grandchild.

== Television roles ==
- 1967–1969: Another World
- 1970–1978, 1983–1984, 1988, 1991–1994, 1997, 2005: All My Children
- 1979–1980: The Baxters
- 1981: The Wave
- 1983: Kennedy
- 1986: Stingray
- 1990, 1992, 1996, 2008: Law & Order
- 2010: Damages
