= Eureka Day =

Stage play by Jonathan Spector

- 2024 Broadway production poster
- Original language: English
- Written by: Jonathan Spector
- Genre: Drama
- Setting: Berkeley, California, Present Day

Premiere
- Date: 2018
- Place: Aurora Theatre Company

Eureka Day is a dramatic stage play written by American playwright Jonathan Spector. The play premiered in 2018 at Aurora Theatre Company in Berkeley, California before premiering on Broadway in 2024, where it won the 2025 Tony Award for Best Revival of a Play.

== Plot ==
The play is set at the Eureka Day School in Berkeley, California, during several meetings between parents and administrators concerning requirements for vaccination after an outbreak of mumps in the student body.

== Original cast and characters ==
Character	Berkeley	Off-Broadway	London	Broadway	Los Angeles
Character	2018	2019	2022	2024	2025
Eli	Teddy Spencer	Brian Wiles	Ben Schnetzer	Thomas Middleditch	Nate Corddry
Don	Rolf Saxon	Thomas Jay Ryan	Mark McKinney	Bill Irwin	Rick Harmon
Suzanne	Lisa Anne Porter	Tina Benko	Helen Hunt	Jessica Hecht	Mia Barron
Meiko/May	Charisse Loriaux	K.K. Moggie	Kirsten Foster	Chelsea Yakura-Kurtz	Camille Chen
Carina	Elizabeth Carter	Elizabeth Carter	Susan Kelechi Watson	Amber Gray	Cherise Booth

== Production history ==
Eureka Day had its world premiere at Aurora Theatre Company in Berkeley, California, as part of their 2017–2018 season and was commissioned through their Originate+Generate program. The production was directed by Josh Costello.

The play had its East Coast premiere off-off-Broadway at Walkerspace on August 29, 2019, directed by Adrienne Campbell-Holt. The original cast was reunited on May 22, 2020, for a virtual reading during the COVID-19 pandemic.

A production opened at the London's Old Vic on September 23, 2022, following previews from September 6, directed by Katy Rudd. The play has been produced at other regional theatres including Asolo Repertory Theatre in 2022 and Syracuse Stage in 2021.

On April 8, 2024, Manhattan Theatre Club announced that Eureka Day would be a part of its 2024-2025 Broadway season, with the production set to open at the Samuel J. Friedman Theatre in November 2024 and with Anna D. Shapiro attached to direct.

A planned 2025 run at the Kennedy Center was cancelled due to "financial circumstances" according to Trump appointees.

In 2026, American Theatre Magazine named the play the third-most produced production in the U.S. for the 2025-2026 season.

== Awards and nominations ==
Year	Award Ceremony	Category	Nominee	Result
2025	Drama Desk Award	Outstanding Revival of a Play		Won
2025	Drama League Award	Outstanding Revival of a Play		Won
2025	Drama League Award	Outstanding Direction of a Play	Anna D. Shapiro	Nominated
2025	Drama League Award	Distinguished Performance	Amber Gray	Nominated
2025	Tony Award	Best Revival of a Play	Eureka Day	Won
2025	Tony Award	Best Featured Actress in a Play	Jessica Hecht	Nominated
2025	Dorian Award	Outstanding Broadway Play Revival		Won
2025	Dorian Award	Outstanding Featured Performance in a Broadway Play	Jessica Hecht	Nominated
