= Joan Shepard =

American actress (1932–2023)

Joan Shepard (1932 – March 3, 2023) was an American theater actress and producer of summer stock and children's theatre productions.

== Early life ==
Joan Shepard was born in New York City in 1932 to Sylvia Wasson Shepard and trumpet player Hayden Shepard. In 1940, she began her Broadway career at age 7 in Romeo and Juliet starring Laurence Olivier and Vivian Leigh. This was followed by credits in Tomorrow the World with Ralph Bellamy and Shirley Booth, Foolish Notion with Tallulah Bankhead, and perhaps most prominently originating the role of Doris in the Broadway production of The Member of the Wedding in 1950 with Julie Harris and Ethel Waters. In 1959 she married fellow actor Evan Thompson.

== Career ==
In 1972, Shepard and Thompson founded the Fanfare Theatre Ensemble, a touring company focused on classic theater adapted for children's audiences. Shepard wrote, directed, and performed in most of the shows. The company toured throughout the US for over 40 years through 2014. The couple also co-founded River Rep which produced summer stock productions at the Ivoryton Playhouse between 1987 and 2005 featuring herself, her husband, and their children Owen Thompson and Jenn Thompson. She died in New York on March 3, 2023.
