= Drama Desk Award for Outstanding Revival of a Play =

American theatre award

Drama Desk Award for Outstanding Revival
- Awarded for: Outstanding Revival of a Play
- Location: New York City
- Country: United States
- Presented by: Drama Desk
- First award: 1993
- Currently held by: Death of a Salesman (2026)
- Website: dramadesk.org (defunct)

The Drama Desk Award for Outstanding Revival of a Play is an annual award presented by Drama Desk in recognition of achievements in the theatre across collective Broadway, off-Broadway and off-off-Broadway productions in New York City. The award was first presented at the 1993 ceremony, after Drama Desk retired the Outstanding Revival (1955–1992), a singular award covering achievement by either a play or a musical production. The accompanying category Revival of a Musical was also created, though it was first presented at the 1994 ceremony.

== Winners and nominees ==
=== 1990s ===
| Year | Play | Writer |
1993
| 1993 | Anna Christie | Eugene O'Neill |
| 1993 | As You Like It | William Shakespeare |
| 1993 | The Price | Arthur Miller |
| 1993 | Wilder, Wilder, Wilder | Thornton Wilder |
1994
| 1994 | An Inspector Calls | J. B. Priestley |
| 1994 | Abe Lincoln in Illinois | Robert E. Sherwood |
| 1994 | The Loman Family Picnic | Donald Margulies |
| 1994 | Medea | Euripides |
| 1994 | Timon of Athens | William Shakespeare |
1995
| 1995 | The Heiress | Ruth Goetz and Augustus Goetz |
| 1995 | As You Like It | William Shakespeare |
| 1995 | Henry VI | William Shakespeare |
| 1995 | Indiscretions | Jean Cocteau |
| 1995 | The Molière Comedies | Molière and Richard Wilbur |
1996
| 1996 | A Delicate Balance | Edward Albee |
| 1996 | A Midsummer Night's Dream | William Shakespeare |
| 1996 | An Ideal Husband | Oscar Wilde |
| 1996 | Dangerous Corner | J. B. Priestley |
| 1996 | Endgame | Samuel Beckett |
| 1996 | The Tempest | William Shakespeare |
1997
| 1997 | A Doll's House | Henrik Ibsen |
| 1997 | The Gin Game | Donald L. Coburn |
| 1997 | June Moon | George S. Kaufman and Ring Lardner |
| 1997 | Present Laughter | Noël Coward |
1998
| 1998 | A View from the Bridge | Arthur Miller |
| 1998 | All My Sons | Arthur Miller |
| 1998 | The American Clock | Arthur Miller |
| 1998 | The Chairs | Eugène Ionesco |
| 1998 | Ivanov | Anton Chekhov |
1999
| 1999 | Death of a Salesman | Arthur Miller |
| 1999 | The Iceman Cometh | Eugene O'Neill |
| 1999 | A Majority of One | Leonard Spigelgass |
| 1999 | Bosoms and Neglect | John Guare |
| 1999 | Electra | Sophocles |
| 1999 | Killer Joe | Tracy Letts |

=== 2000s ===
| Year | Play | Writer |
2000
| 2000 | The Real Thing | Tom Stoppard |
| 2000 | A Moon for the Misbegotten | Eugene O'Neill |
| 2000 | The Price | Arthur Miller |
| 2000 | True West | Sam Shepard |
| 2000 | Uncle Vanya | Anton Chekhov |
| 2000 | Waste | Harley Granville Barker |
2001
| 2001 | The Best Man | Gore Vidal |
| 2001 | Betrayal | Harold Pinter |
| 2001 | One Flew Over the Cuckoo's Nest | Dale Wasserman |
| 2001 | Richard II | William Shakespeare |
| 2001 | The Search for Signs of Intelligent Life in the Universe | Jane Wagner |
| 2001 | Tiny Alice | Edward Albee |
2002
| 2002 | Private Lives | Noël Coward |
| 2002 | The Crucible | Arthur Miller |
| 2002 | Cymbeline | William Shakespeare |
| 2002 | Morning's at Seven | Paul Osborn |
| 2002 | Noises Off | Michael Frayn |
| 2002 | The Seagull | Anton Chekhov |
2003
| 2003 | Long Day's Journey into Night | Eugene O'Neill |
| 2003 | A Day in the Death of Joe Egg | Peter Nichols |
| 2003 | Dinner at Eight | George S. Kaufman and Edna Ferber |
| 2003 | Medea | Euripides |
| 2003 | Twelfth Night | William Shakespeare |
| 2003 | Uncle Vanya | Anton Chekhov |
2004
| 2004 | Henry IV | William Shakespeare |
| 2004 | A Midsummer Night's Dream | William Shakespeare |
| 2004 | A Raisin in the Sun | Lorraine Hansberry |
| 2004 | The Colleen Bawn | Dion Boucicault |
| 2004 | The Daughter-in-Law | D. H. Lawrence |
| 2004 | The Normal Heart | Larry Kramer |
2005
| 2005 | Twelve Angry Men | Reginald Rose |
| 2005 | Glengarry Glen Ross | David Mamet |
| 2005 | Hurlyburly | David Rabe |
| 2005 | Outward Bound | Sutton Vane |
| 2005 | Pullman Car Hiawatha | Thornton Wilder |
| 2005 | Who's Afraid of Virginia Woolf? | Edward Albee |
2006
| 2006 | Awake and Sing! | Clifford Odets |
| 2006 | The Caine Mutiny Court-Martial | Herman Wouk |
| 2006 | Philadelphia, Here I Come! | Brian Friel |
| 2006 | Soldier's Wife | Rose Franken |
| 2006 | The Traveling Lady | Horton Foote |
| 2006 | The Trip to Bountiful | Horton Foote |
2007
| 2007 | Journey's End | R. C. Sherriff |
| 2007 | The Hairy Ape | Eugene O'Neill |
| 2007 | Hedda Gabler | Henrik Ibsen |
| 2007 | Talk Radio | Eric Bogosian |
| 2007 | The Taming of the Shrew | William Shakespeare |
| 2007 | Woyzeck | Georg Büchner |
2008
| 2008 | Boeing-Boeing | Marc Camoletti |
| 2008 | The Country Girl | Clifford Odets |
| 2008 | The Dining Room | A. R. Gurney |
| 2008 | Happy Days | Samuel Beckett |
| 2008 | Macbeth | William Shakespeare |
| 2008 | The Return of the Prodigal | St. John Emile Clavering Hankin |
2009
| 2009 | The Norman Conquests | Alan Ayckbourn |
| 2009 | Blithe Spirit | Noël Coward |
| 2009 | The Cripple of Inishmaan | Martin McDonagh |
| 2009 | Exit the King | Eugène Ionesco |
| 2009 | Mary Stuart | Friedrich Schiller |
| 2009 | Waiting for Godot | Samuel Beckett |

=== 2010s ===
| Year | Play | Writer |
2010 (tie)
| 2010 (tie) | A View from the Bridge | Arthur Miller |
| 2010 (tie) | Fences | August Wilson |
| 2010 (tie) | The Boys in the Band | Mart Crowley |
| 2010 (tie) | Brighton Beach Memoirs | Neil Simon |
| 2010 (tie) | Hamlet | William Shakespeare |
| 2010 (tie) | So Help Me God! | Maurine Dallas Watkins |
2011
| 2011 | The Normal Heart | Larry Kramer |
| 2011 | Born Yesterday | Garson Kanin |
| 2011 | The House of Blue Leaves | John Guare |
| 2011 | The Importance of Being Earnest | Oscar Wilde |
| 2011 | The Merchant of Venice | William Shakespeare |
| 2011 | Three Sisters | Anton Chekhov |
2012
| 2012 | Death of a Salesman | Arthur Miller |
| 2012 | A Little Journey | Albert Lewin and George Marion Jr. |
| 2012 | The Best Man | Gore Vidal |
| 2012 | The Lady from Dubuque | Edward Albee |
| 2012 | Lost in Yonkers | Neil Simon |
| 2012 | Richard III | William Shakespeare |
2013
| 2013 | Who's Afraid of Virginia Woolf? | Edward Albee |
| 2013 | Golden Boy | Clifford Odets |
| 2013 | The Good Person of Szechwan | Bertolt Brecht |
| 2013 | The Piano Lesson | August Wilson |
| 2013 | The Trip to Bountiful | Horton Foote |
| 2013 | Uncle Vanya | Anton Chekhov |
2014
| 2014 | Twelfth Night | William Shakespeare |
| 2014 | The Cripple of Inishmaan | Martin McDonagh |
| 2014 | I Remember Mama | John Van Druten |
| 2014 | London Wall | John Van Druten |
| 2014 | The Model Apartment | Donald Margulies |
| 2014 | No Man's Land | Harold Pinter |
| 2014 | Of Mice and Men | John Steinbeck |
2015
| 2015 | The Elephant Man | Bernard Pomerance |
| 2015 | Fashions for Men | Ferenc Molnár |
| 2015 | Ghosts | Henrik Ibsen |
| 2015 | The Iceman Cometh | Eugene O'Neill |
| 2015 | Tamburlaine the Great | Christopher Marlowe |
| 2015 | The Wayside Motor Inn | A. R. Gurney |
2016
| 2016 | A View from the Bridge | Arthur Miller |
| 2016 | Cloud 9 | Caryl Churchill |
| 2016 | Death of a Salesman | Arthur Miller |
| 2016 | Henry IV | William Shakespeare |
| 2016 | Long Day's Journey into Night | Eugene O'Neill |
| 2016 | Women Without Men | Hazel Ellis |
2017
| 2017 | Jitney | August Wilson |
| 2017 | The Front Page | Ben Hecht and Charles MacArthur |
| 2017 | The Hairy Ape | Eugene O'Neill |
| 2017 | The Little Foxes | Lillian Hellman |
| 2017 | "Master Harold"...and the Boys | Athol Fugard |
| 2017 | Picnic | William Inge |
2018
| 2018 | Angels in America | Tony Kushner |
| 2018 | Hindle Wakes | Stanley Houghton |
| 2018 | In the Blood | Suzan-Lori Parks |
| 2018 | Three Tall Women | Edward Albee |
| 2018 | Travesties | Tom Stoppard |
2019
| 2019 | The Waverly Gallery | Kenneth Lonergan |
| 2019 | Fabulation, or the Re-Education of Undine | Lynn Nottage |
| 2019 | Henry VI: Shakespeare's Trilogy in Two Parts | William Shakespeare |
| 2019 | Our Lady of 121st Street | Stephen Adly Guirgis |
| 2019 | Summer and Smoke | Tennessee Williams |
| 2019 | Uncle Vanya | Anton Chekhov |

=== 2020s ===
| Year | Play | Writer |
2020
| 2020 | A Soldier's Play | Charles Fuller |
| 2020 | Fefu and Her Friends | María Irene Fornés |
| 2020 | for colored girls who have considered suicide/when the rainbow is enuf | Ntozake Shange |
| 2020 | Mac Beth | William Shakespeare, adapted by Erica Schmidt |
| 2020 | Much Ado About Nothing | William Shakespeare |
| 2021 | No awards: New York theatres shuttered, March 2020 to September 2021, due to the COVID-19 pandemic in New York City | |
2022
| 2022 | How I Learned to Drive | Paula Vogel |
| 2022 | for colored girls who have considered suicide/when the rainbow is enuf | Ntozake Shange |
| 2022 | Lackawanna Blues | Ruben Santiago-Hudson |
| 2022 | Skeleton Crew | Dominique Morisseau |
| 2022 | Trouble in Mind | Alice Childress |
| 2022 | Twilight: Los Angeles, 1992 | Anna Deavere Smith |
2023
| 2023 | The Piano Lesson | August Wilson |
| 2023 | A Raisin in the Sun | Lorraine Hansberry |
| 2023 | Death of a Salesman | Arthur Miller |
| 2023 | Endgame | Samuel Beckett |
| 2023 | Ohio State Murders | Adrienne Kennedy |
| 2023 | Wedding Band | Alice Childress |
2024
| 2024 | Appropriate | Branden Jacobs-Jenkins |
| 2024 | Doubt | John Patrick Shanley |
| 2024 | Philadelphia, Here I Come! | Brian Friel |
| 2024 | Purlie Victorious | Ossie Davis |
| 2024 | Uncle Vanya | Anton Chekov |
| 2025 | Eureka Day | Jonathan Spector |
| 2025 | Garside's Career | Harold Brighouse |
| 2025 | Home | Samm-Art Williams |
| 2025 | Wine in the Wilderness | Alice Childress |
| 2025 | Yellow Face | David Henry Hwang |
2026
| 2026 | Death of a Salesman | Arthur Miller |
| 2026 | Becky Shaw | Gina Gionfriddo |
| 2026 | Ceremonies in Dark Old Men | Lonne Elder III |
| 2026 | Los Soles Truncos | René Marqués |
| 2026 | Titus Andronicus | William Shakespeare |
| 2026 | You Got Older | Clare Barron |

== See also ==
- Laurence Olivier Award for Best Revival
- Tony Award for Best Revival of a Play
