= Birthright (play) =

Stage play by Jen Silverman

- Original language: English
- Written by: Jonathan Spector
- Genre: Drama
- Setting: three time periods; 2006, 2016, 2024.

Premiere
- Date: 2025
- Place: Miami New Drama, U.S.

Birthright is a dramatic stage play written by American playwright Jonathan Spector. The play concerns a group of six friends who meet during their Birthright trip and how their lives and relationships change between three timeframes in 2006, 2016, and 2024.

== Synopsis ==
A group of six young Ashkanazi Jewish Americans meet during their Birthright trip in 2006. In the decades to come, the play observes how their relationships and lives change until they are nearing forty years old.

== Original cast and characters ==
Character	Miami	Off-Broadway
Character	2025	2026
Lev	Hale Appleman	Hale Appleman
Chaya	Dani Stoller	Zoe Winters
Alona	Krystal Millie Valdes	Molly Ranson
Izzy	Arielle Goldman	Molly Bernard
Noah	Stephen Stocking	Eli Gelb
Emerson	Danny Capote	Nate Mann
Deborah, Chaya's mother	Irene Adjan	Liz Larsen

== Production history ==
=== Miami New Drama (2025) ===
The play was first performed at Miami New Drama, directed by Teddy Bergman. The show ran from April 3, 2025 until April 27. The play was developed through the YK6 New Jewish Play Inititative and the Wasserman Projects under artistic director Michel Hausmann, whose goal is to create stage works that recognize the challenges within and contributions of the Jewish community.

=== Off-Broadway (2026) ===
The play premiered Off-Broadway in 2026 at the MCC Theater, running from June 16, 2026 until August 23 and again directed by Bergman. The play had a sold-out run and was extended an extra four weeks beyond its original closing date.

=== Broadway (2027) ===
The play will premiere on Broadway, again directed by Bergman, at the Hudson Theatre, with previews beginning February 23rd ahead of a March 15 opening. The play will have a limited run set to end July 25, 2027.
