= Elizabeth Baker (playwright) =

English playwright

Elizabeth Baker (20 August 1876 – 8 March 1962) was an English playwright whose plays explored class, gender and the domestic and professional lives of the lower middle classes.

Baker was born in London on 20 August 1876. Her parents were drapers and she began her working life as a drapery assistant, and later a typist, newspaper editor and journalist for The Spectator. In June 1915 at the age of 39 she married James Allaway, a widower. Baker worked for the suffrage movement and was involved with the Women Writers Suffrage League and the National Union of Women's Suffrage Societies.

The themes of Baker's plays arose from her social consciousness and were analyses of class, gender and social mobility. The plot of her first play Beastly Pride (1907), performed by the Croydon Repertory Theatre, considered a lower middle-class girl who wished to marry a working class builder and her parents' objection to the marriage. The constrained lives of the lower middle-class clerical classes and the issue of marriage was the subject of Baker's first full-length play Chains (1909).

Edith (1912) was first performed as a fund-raiser for the Women Writers Suffrage League at the Princes Theatre in London, and deals with the issues of a woman inheriting wealth from a family business. Working women and economic insecurity are the themes of other plays including Partnership, Miss Tassey, The Price of Thomas Scott, Miss Robinson and Penelope Forgives.

After World War I Baker and Allaway lived in Rarotonga in the Cook Islands for nearly two years. After the death of Allaway in 1941, Baker moved to Bishop's Stortford in Hertfordshire where she lived with her stepsister. She died in Bishop's Stortford on 8 March 1962.

Not long before her death ITV televised two of her plays: Chains was produced as Ticket for Tomorrow in November 1959, and Miss Robinson as Private and Confidential in May 1960.

Baker was reintroduced to a British audience when Chains was staged for the first time in nearly a century by the Orange Tree Theatre in November 2007.

In 2019 Mint Theater Company in New York City launched the "Meet Miss Baker" series which aims to present several of Baker's works through full productions and readings; to "bring new attention to this long forgotten, much deserving author." In 2019 they produced The Price of Thomas Scott. They also presented readings of Edith and Miss Tassey. In 2020 they planned to present Chains and Partnership but these plans were interrupted by the COVID-19 Pandemic. They went on to present Chains in the summer of 2022 at Theatre Row with the same cast as had been scheduled two years earlier. They also staged a reading of Penelope Forgives.

== Plays ==
- Beastly Pride (1907) - originally titled A Question of Caste
- Chains (1909)
- Cupid in Clapham (1910)
- Miss Tassey (1910)
- Edith (1912)
- The Price of Thomas Scott (1913)
- Beastly Pride (1914)
- Over a Garden Wall (1915)
- Partnership (1917)
- Miss Robinson (1918)
- Bert's Girl (1927)
- Umbrellas (1927)
- Penelope Forgives (1930)
- One of the Spicers (1932)
