= The Actors Company Theatre =

Off-Broadway theatre company

Coordinates: 40°45′30.79″N 73°59′36.14″W

The Actors Company Theatre (TACT)
- Interactive map of The Actors Company Theatre (TACT)
- Address: 900 Broadway Suite 905; New York City; United States
- Type: Off-Broadway

Construction
- Opened: 1992
- Closed: 2018

The Actors Company Theatre (TACT) was an Off-Broadway theatre company founded in 1992 by a group of New York stage veterans. For several years, TACT produced many concert performances, a cross between a staged reading and a full production. In 2006, TACT began a residency at the Beckett Theatre on Theatre Row to produce two full plays a year. TACT focused on reviving lesser-known productions that have not been performed in New York for several years. According to their website, their mission statement was "to present neglected or rarely produced plays of literary merit, with a focus on creating theatre from its essence: the text and the actor's ability to bring it to life."

== History ==
The Actors Company Theatre was founded in 1992 by a group of actors. Beginning in the 2006–2007 season, TACT produced its Mainstage Off-Broadway productions in the Beckett Theatre. The following year, TACT became a resident company of NYC's Theatre Row. TACT also presented a Salon Series in a studio space at 900 Broadway.

For their Sixteenth Season, TACT followed the trajectory begun in 2006 and presented two more productions on their Mainstage at Theatre Row. TACT also ran a program for creating new works called "New Tactics." For all these productions, they commissioned original, incidental musical scores through their partnership with The Manhattan School of Music.

In January 2018, TACT announced that their 25th season would be their final season.

== Past productions ==
TACT received notably positive reviews, particularly from the New York Times, for its productions of Lovers, Lost in Yonkers, Home, and Eccentricities of a Nightingale.

Notable productions:

- Lovers – Brian Friel
- Lost in Yonkers – Neil Simon
- Home – David Storey
- The Sea – Edward Bond
- The Runner Stumbles – Milan Stitt
- Eccentricities of a Nightingale – Tennessee Williams
- Bedroom Farce – Alan Ayckbourn
- Incident At Vichy – Arthur Miller

== Awards and nominations ==
In 2012, TACT produced Neil Simon's Lost in Yonkers and Brian Friel's Lovers to critical and commercial success resulting in The Wall Street Journal naming TACT "Company of the Year," saying "...Smart programming, superlative productions, a track record of consistent excellence: TACT is what off-Broadway ought to be." In addition, their production of Lost in Yonkers by Neil Simon brought TACT their first Drama Desk Award nomination, being nominated for Outstanding Revival of a Play. A list of reviews for TACT's other productions can be found on their website.

Year	Award	Nominated work	Category	Result
2012	Drama Desk Award	Lost in Yonkers	Outstanding Revival of a Play	Nominated

== Members ==
TACT's final co-artistic directors were founding members Scott Alan Evans and actors Simon Jones and Cynthia Harris, along with Jenn Thompson.

Company members included:

- Cynthia Darlow – Actor
- Joseph Trapanese – Composer
- David Staller - Actor and Director
- Jack Koenig - Actor
