= Comstock-Cheney Hall =

- U.S. National Register of Historic Places
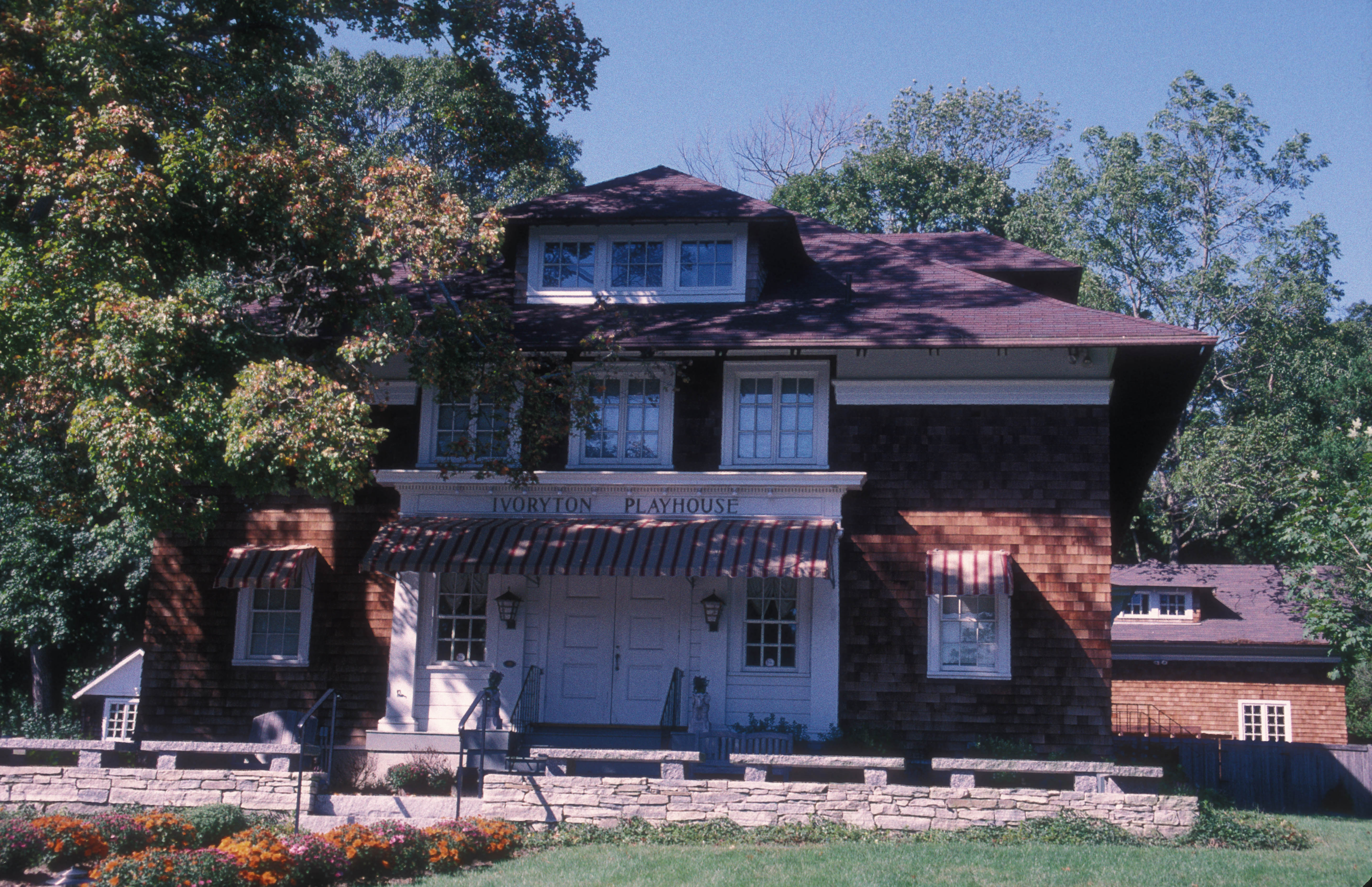

- Location within Connecticut Location within the United States
- Location: 103 Main Street, Ivoryton, Connecticut
- Coordinates: 41°20′55″N 72°26′32″W
- Area: 0.6 acres (0.24 ha)
- Built: 1910 and 1938
- Architectural style: Classical Revival
- NRHP reference No.: 82003769
- Added to NRHP: April 15, 1982

Ivoryton Playhouse, also known as Comstock-Cheney Hall, is a theater building located in the village of Ivoryton in the town of Essex, Connecticut, US. It is listed in the National Register of Historic Places. The theatre is believed to be the first continuously operating summer theatre in the United States.

== Construction ==
Construction began in 1910 and was completed 1911 as a recreation hall for the Comstock-Cheney factory, a major manufacturing plant in Ivoryton, Connecticut, that was known for making piano keys and actions from ivory. The building includes Classical Revival architecture. When listed the property included three contributing buildings on an area of 0.6 acres (0.24 ha). The Playhouse is on the National Register of Historic Places, as is indicated on the front of the building.

== Theatre ==
The theatre is believed to be the first self-supporting summer theatre in the United States. Although there were older theatres in Dennis, MA and Skowhegan, ME, they were endowed by foundations of wealthy families and not self-supporting. It was established a year before the Westport Country Playhouse, and it is regarded as the oldest continuously running, self-supporting summer theater in the nation.

== History ==
Built in 1911 as a recreation hall for the workers for the Comstock-Cheney factory, the building hosted silent movies, dances, town meetings, and vaudeville shows. In 1930, under the direction of Milton Stiefel, assistant to David Belasco, the theater became summer home of most of the great names of the American stage. Stiefel’s company, made up mostly of his friends, called themselves The New York Players. They lived in private homes in Ivoryton from which most of the sets and props were borrowed. In 1938, Stiefel bought the building and the company gained in prestige to the point that invitations to work there were highly prized in the theater profession. Its reputation grew nationally and Paramount Pictures produced a short film showing its complete operation. Established actors like Henry Hull and Norma Terris signed on to perform at the theater as well as newcomers like Katharine Hepburn and Cliff Robertson. During World War II the theater went dark due to gasoline rationing. After the war, the playhouse reopened, featuring future stars Marlon Brando, Ethel Waters, Art Carney, Tallulah Bankhead, Helen Hayes, Ezio Pinza, Betty Grable, Madge Evans, Vivian Vance, Groucho Marx, June Lockhart, Gloria Vanderbilt, and Don Ameche. After Steifel's retirement in 1973, the playhouse changed ownership until 1979 when the Ivoryton Playhouse Foundation formed to buy the historic property.

From 1987-2005 the New York theater company River Rep produced summer stock play and musical productions at the playhouse under the artistic direction of Jane Stanton, Evan Thompson, and wife Joan Shepard. In 2001, the Ivoryton Playhouse Foundation began a total renovation of the building which included new shingles, a new heating and air conditioning system, new seats and state-of-the-art theatrical sound and lighting systems. In 2005, after 19 seasons, the theater company parted ways with the playhouse foundation. Jacqueline Hubbard has served as executive director since 2005.

The Ivoryton Playhouse continues to produce summer theater as well as a year-round professional season of musicals, comedies and dramas entertaining over 25,000 people each year. Educational programs and performances for children and seniors are also produced throughout the year as are special events and partnerships with local non-profit organizations.

== See also ==
- National Register of Historic Places listings in Middlesex County, Connecticut
