= Aurora Theatre Company =

Organization in Berkeley, California

- Formation: 1991
- Type: Theatre group
- Location: Berkeley, California
- Artistic director: Jennifer King
- Website: http://www.auroratheatre.org

Aurora Theatre Company is a professional theatre company located in Berkeley, California.

== History ==
The company was founded by actor and director Barbara Oliver along with Dorothy Bryant, Marge Glicksman, Richard Rossi, and Ken Grantham in 1992 with the desire to continue to produce plays "about something important; ideas mediated by language and people, which are assisted by other elements like sets, lights and costumes," not dominated by them. The founders of Aurora Theatre Company came together around the development and production of a new play: Dorothy Bryant's Dear Master.

== Programs ==
The company produced a five play season until 2024, when its programming was cut to four productions. In addition to their regular season, they produced an annual staged reading festival known as the Global Age Project.

== Location ==
Aurora Theatre Company had a small, intimate performance space, and had been referred to as “chamber theatre.”

In 2000, the company moved to a dedicated custom-designed 150-seat theater in downtown Berkeley, situated immediately adjacent to the Berkeley Repertory Theatre. The company closed its theater in 2025.

== Recognition ==
The company has won 20 awards from the Bay Area Theatre Critics Circle. Aurora received a $25,000 Wallace Alexander Gerbode Foundation award in 2000 for new play production. The San Francisco Weekly named Aurora Outstanding Bay Area Theatre Company.

They operate under a Tier 4 BAT contract with Actors' Equity Association. Currently, more than one-third of the budget is allocated to acting salaries, with Aurora Theatre Company having been commended for the high percentage of Equity actors in its productions.

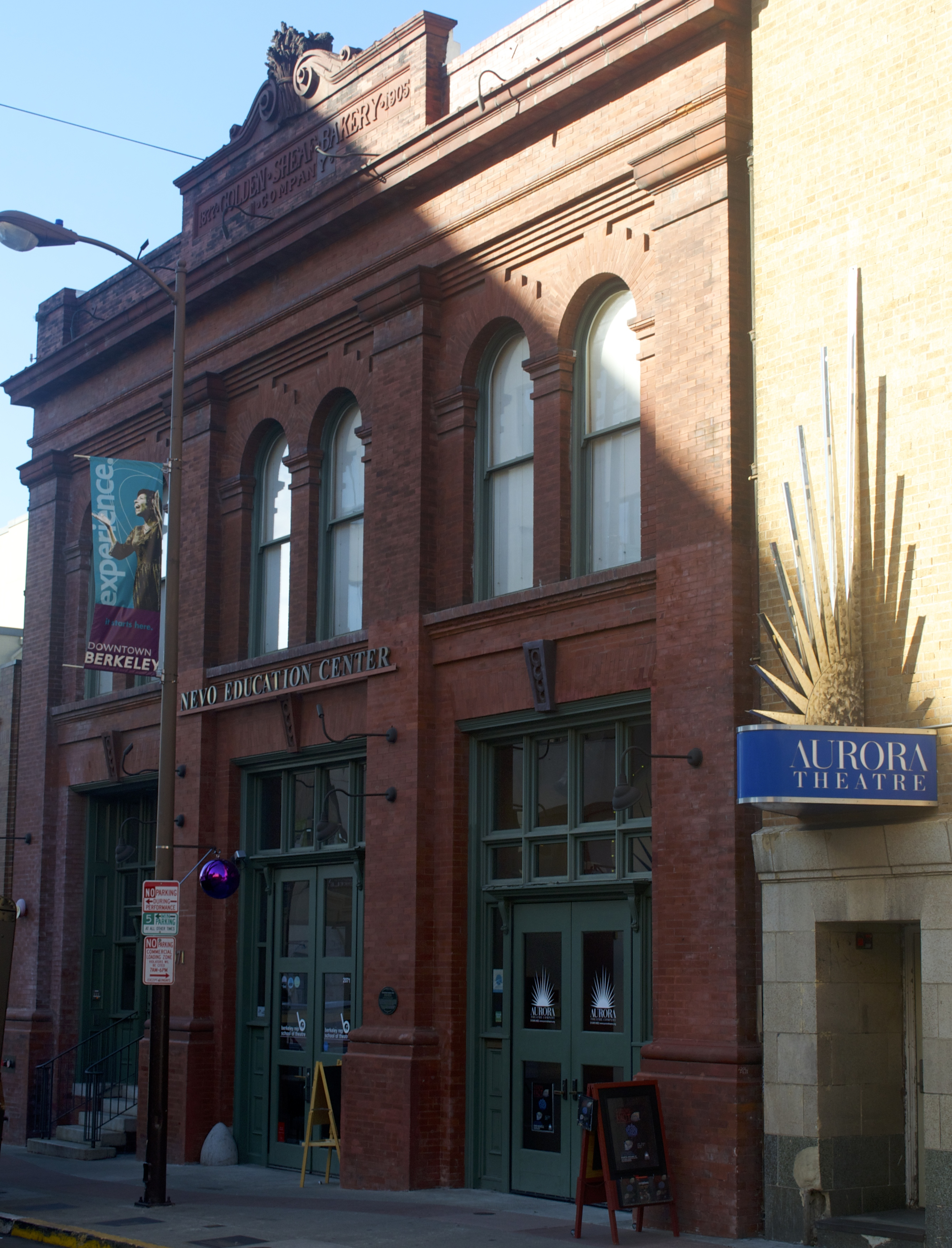
The Berkeley location at 2081 Addison St.

== Financial woes and suspension of programming ==
In June 2024 Aurora approached Berkeley City Council for emergency funding of $350,000. The company was granted $150,000 by the city and raised an additional $250,000 from private donors. The company downsized employees, scaled back its season from five to four productions, and the then artistic director Costello and managing director Robin Dolan each agreed to take a 25% pay cut (at the time Costello earned in excess of $110,000 and Dolan over $88,000 per year). In May 2025 the company sought additional emergency funding of $50,000 to finish its season and announced the suspension of its planned 2025-2026 season, citing a $500,000 budget deficit and flagging subscriptions.

As the staff was laid off in August 2025, then-artistic director Josh Costello hinted at a possible merger with another Bay Area theater company, but did not provide details. No performances have been announced beyond August 2025, when the company's production of The Search for Signs of Intelligent Life in the Universe closed. In May 2026, the company website described its state as one of "hibernation."

In June 2026 the company announced new artistic leadership in Jennifer King and Jenn Ruygt as artistic director and managing director, respectively, with the goal of producing a 2027-2028 season, though it will not be returning to its former Berkeley space.

== List of productions that premiered at Aurora ==
1991–1992

- Dear Master - Dorothy Bryant (world premiere)

1995–1996

- The Panel - Dorothy Bryant (world premiere)

1996–1997

- Gunplay - Frank Higgins (west coast premiere)

1997–1998

- Abigail's Party - Mike Leigh (American premiere)
- Posing for Gauguin - Dorothy Bryant (world premiere)

1998–1999

- Death Defying Acts - David Mamet, May, Allen (west coast premiere)

1999–2000

- Transcendental Wild Oats - LeClanche DuRand (world premiere)
- Split - Mayo Simon (world premiere)

2002–2003

- Alarms and Excursions - Michael Frayn (west coast premiere)
- Partition - Ira Hauptman (world premiere)

2003–2004

- Antigone Falun Gong - Cherylene Lee (world premiere)

2004–2005

- The Persians - Aeschylus, new adaptation by Ellen McLaughlin (west coast premiere)
- Emma - Michael Fry, from the novel by Jane Austen (west coast premiere)

2005–2006

- Marius - Marcel Pagnol, translated by Zack Rogow (world premiere translation)
- The Master Builder - Henrik Ibsen, translated by Paul Walsh (world premiere translation)
- Small Tragedy - Craig Lucas (west coast premiere)

2006–2007

- Ice Glen - Joan Ackermann (west coast premiere)

2007–2008

- Satellites - Diana Son (west coast premiere)
- The Trojan Women - Ellen McLaughlin/Euripides (professional world premiere)
- The Busy World is Hushed - Keith Bunin (west coast premiere)

2008–2009

- The Coverlettes Cover Christmas (world premiere)
- Betrayed - George Packer (west coast premiere)
- Jack Goes Boating - Bob Glaudini (bay area premiere)

2009–2010

- The First Grade - Joel Drake Johnson (world premiere)
- Speech & Debate - Stephen Karam (bay area premiere)

2016–2017

- Safe House - Keith Josef Adkins (west coast premiere)

2017–2018

- Eureka Day - Jonathan Spector (world premiere)
