= Miss Bennet: Christmas at Pemberley =

Play

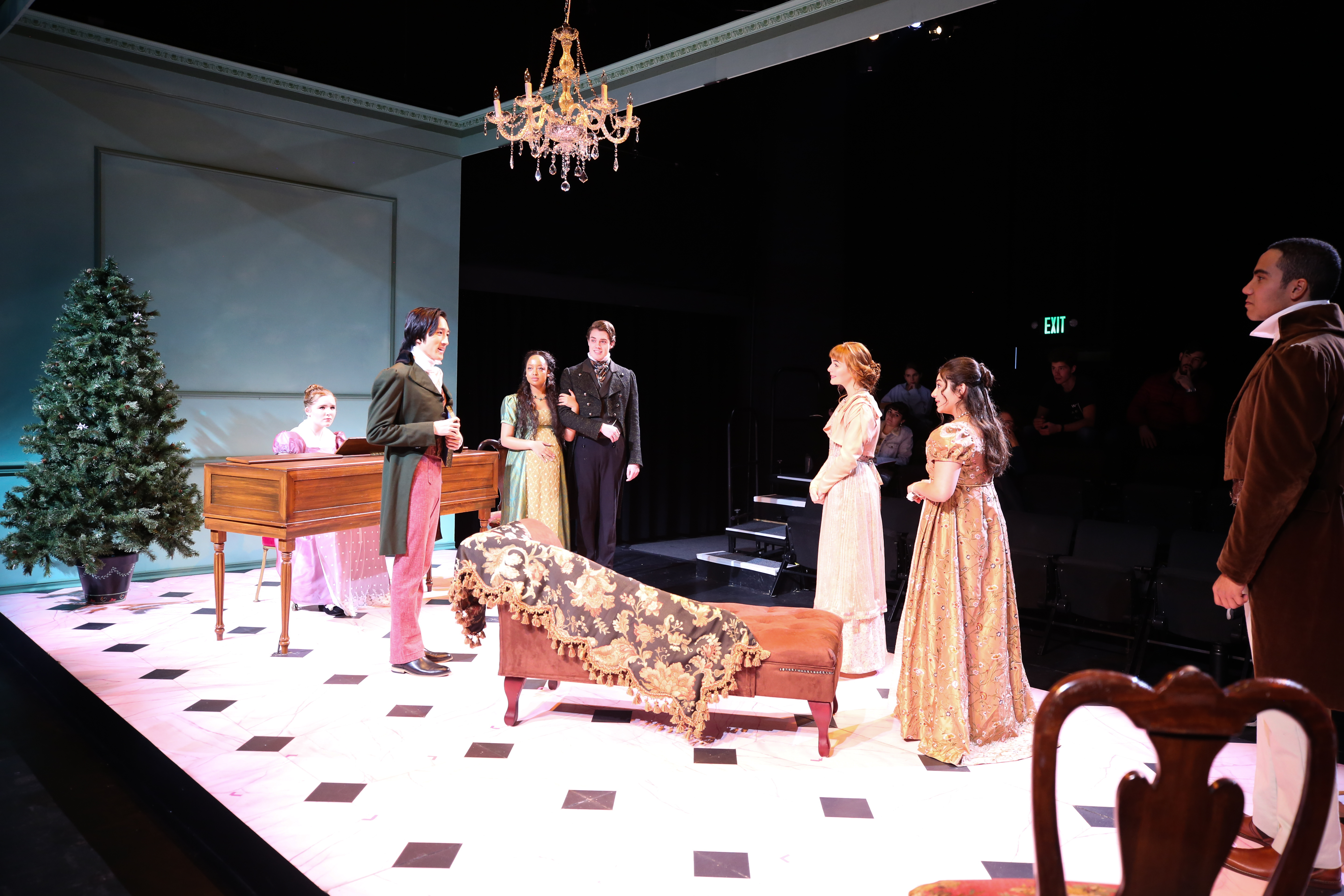

Miss Bennet: Christmas at Pemberley is a 2016 play by Lauren Gunderson and Margot Melcon. The play centers on Mary Bennet, the middle sister in Jane Austen's novel Pride and Prejudice. It was one of the most produced plays in the United States in 2018 with 13 productions.

Miss Bennet: Christmas at Pemberley was originally produced simultaneously by Northlight Theatre in Skokie, Illinois, Round House Theatre in Bethesda, Maryland, and Marin Theatre Company in Mill Valley, California in November 2016.
