= Connecticut Critics Circle =

Theatre critics' organisation

The Connecticut Critics Circle is an organization of reviewers, feature writers, columnists, and broadcasters throughout Connecticut, Massachusetts, Rhode Island, and New York. It was founded in 1990.

== Mission statement ==
"To honor the actors, directors, designers and others who help make professional Connecticut theater so outstanding. ... The organization's members also meet to discuss issues regarding theater criticism. Additionally, it invites prominent guest speakers to address the membership in meetings that are open to the public."

== Awards ==
Their annual awards are considered prestigious.

The Tom Killen Memorial Award "is bestowed upon those who have made extraordinary contributions to Connecticut's Equity professional theater." Gordon Edelstein won that award, among others, including Outstanding Director of a Play for Uncle Vanya in 2007.

Jeff Kready received a Connecticut Critics Circle Nomination for Outstanding Supporting Actor in a Musical.

Jeremy Jordan was nominated in 2008 for his role as Alex in The Little Dog Laughed at Hartford Theatreworks.

Joyce Ebert earned a special achievement award in 1996 for "30 years of outstanding contribution to a theater in Connecticut."

David Esbjornson received seven awards for Dealer's Choice.

Frank Ferrante received the award for his portrayal of Captain Spalding in Animal Crackers at Goodspeed Opera House.
