= Ivoryton, Connecticut =

- Ivoryton Historic District
- U.S. National Register of Historic Places
- U.S. Historic district
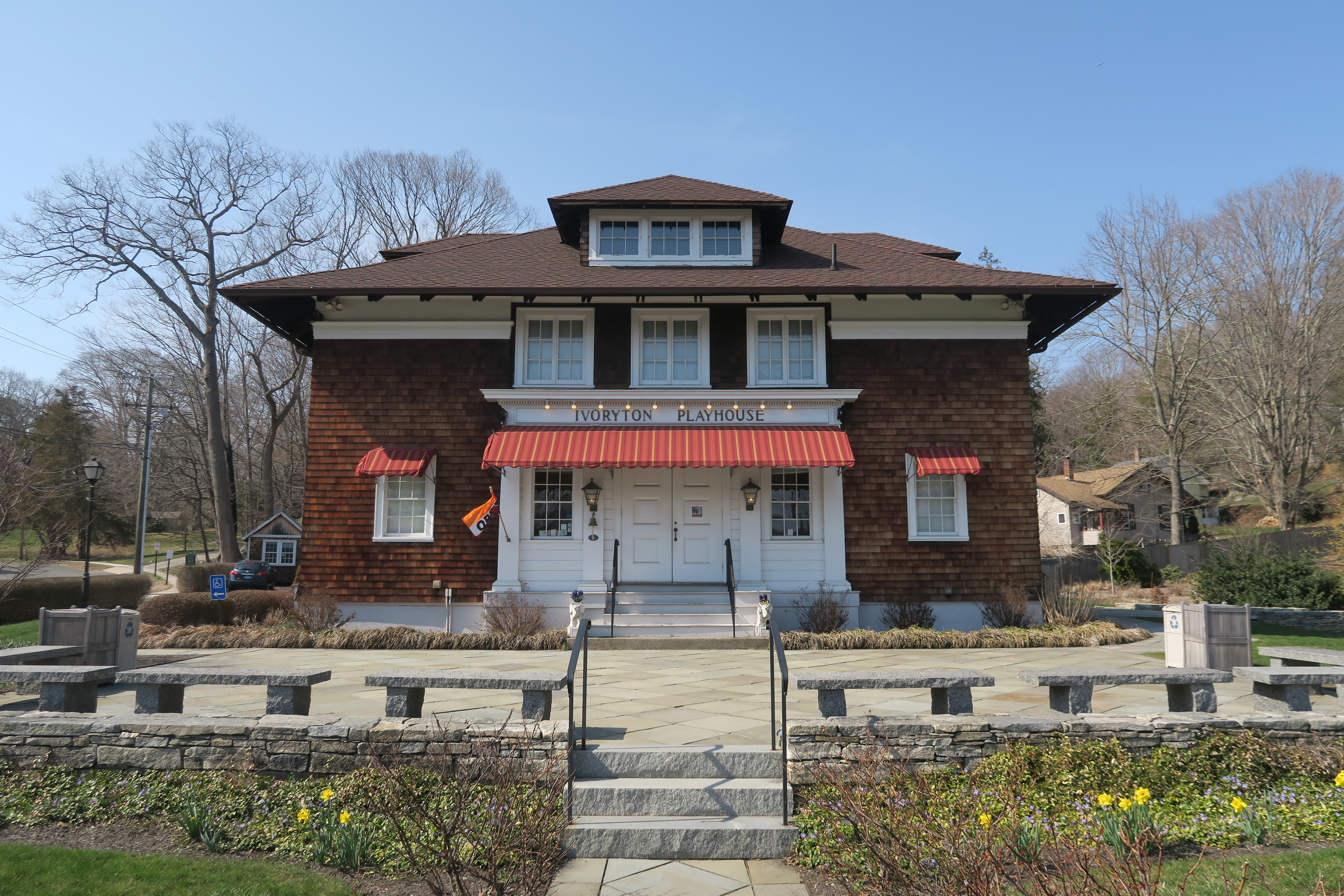
- Ivoryton Playhouse

- Location within Connecticut Location within the United States
- Location: Roughly bounded by Main Street, North Main Street, Oak Street, Blake Street, Summit Street, Park Road, and Comstock Avenue, Ivoryton, Essex, Connecticut
- Coordinates: 41°20′54″N 72°26′21″W
- Built: Various
- Architectural style: Various
- NRHP reference No.: 13000895
- Added to NRHP: April 15, 2015

Ivoryton is one of three villages in Essex, Connecticut, United States in Middlesex County. Ivoryton Historic District, the historic district in the village, was listed on the National Register of Historic Places on April 15, 2014.

The Ivoryton Playhouse, which is separately listed on the Register, is located within the district.

== History and historic district ==
Ivoryton is roughly bounded by Main Street, North Main Street, Oak Street, Blake Street, Summit Street, Park Road, and Comstock Avenue. The area is known as a "well-preserved example of a nineteenth-century company town" and a world center of the ivory industry.

The area became industrialized when Comstock, Cheney & Company, an ivory import business founded by Samuel Merritt Comstock, an Ivoryton native, and his partner George A. Cheney in the 1860s was founded there. The district was one of several industrial areas in the Connecticut River Valley established during the late nineteenth century, and is also historically significant as a center for immigrants from Sweden, Germany, Italy, and Poland, who lived in worker housing areas throughout Ivoryton.

Pratt, Read & Company was located just a few miles away from Comstock, Cheney & Company along the Connecticut River, and these two largest American ivory manufacturers "commanded a monopoly on all ivory production in the United States." The area thrived between 1860 and 1938, and at its height the area employed and housed up to 600 workers. The National Register of Historical Places states:

"The historic district consists of early Colonial structures representing the agrarian village before its industrial transformation, mid- to late-nineteenth-century ivory processing and manufacturing buildings, high-style Victorian homes for company executives, modest vernacular homes and tenements for factory workers, and public buildings such as churches, a post office, company store, library, and a town meeting hall. Although some of the factory buildings have been demolished, the industry-defining bleach houses are gone, many houses have been remodeled, and the village itself sustained damage in a flood in 1982, Ivoryton's historic character remains intact as an example of a planned community not unlike more formalized 'company towns' in an industry unique to the Connecticut River Valley. The period of significance ranges from the construction of earliest known extant building (Joseph Parker Homestead; ca. 1719) to the divestment of company-owned housing in 1938."

== See also ==
- National Register of Historic Places listings in Middlesex County, Connecticut
