= Cynthia Darlow =

American actress

- Occupation: Actress
- Years active: 1987–present

Cynthia Darlow is an American actress.

== Career ==
For five seasons, Darlow was an ensemble player and announcer on the children's educational series Square One Television. On television, she has made numerous appearances in three of the different Law & Order series, and guest starred on Soul Man and The Sopranos. In 1990, she played the part of Marge in Sesame Street Home Video Visits the Firehouse. In 2017, Darlow began playing the recurring role of Mrs. Moskowitz on the Amazon Prime comedy-drama series The Marvelous Mrs. Maisel.

Her film credits include The Thomas Crown Affair (1999), Lost Souls (2000) and 25th Hour (2002).

Darlow has many on- and off-Broadway credits, including Grease, Prelude to a Kiss, Rumors, Taller Than a Dwarf and Trouble in Paradise. Darlow is a member of the New York-based Actors Company Theatre (TACT).

== Personal life ==
Darlow married Philip Myers Reid on May 30, 1970 in Greensboro, NC. Darlow was formerly married to Ralph J. Erenzo, and is currently married to audiobook narrator Richard Ferrone.
