= Theatre Row (New York City) =

Entertainment district in Manhattan, New York

Theatre Row Entertainment District
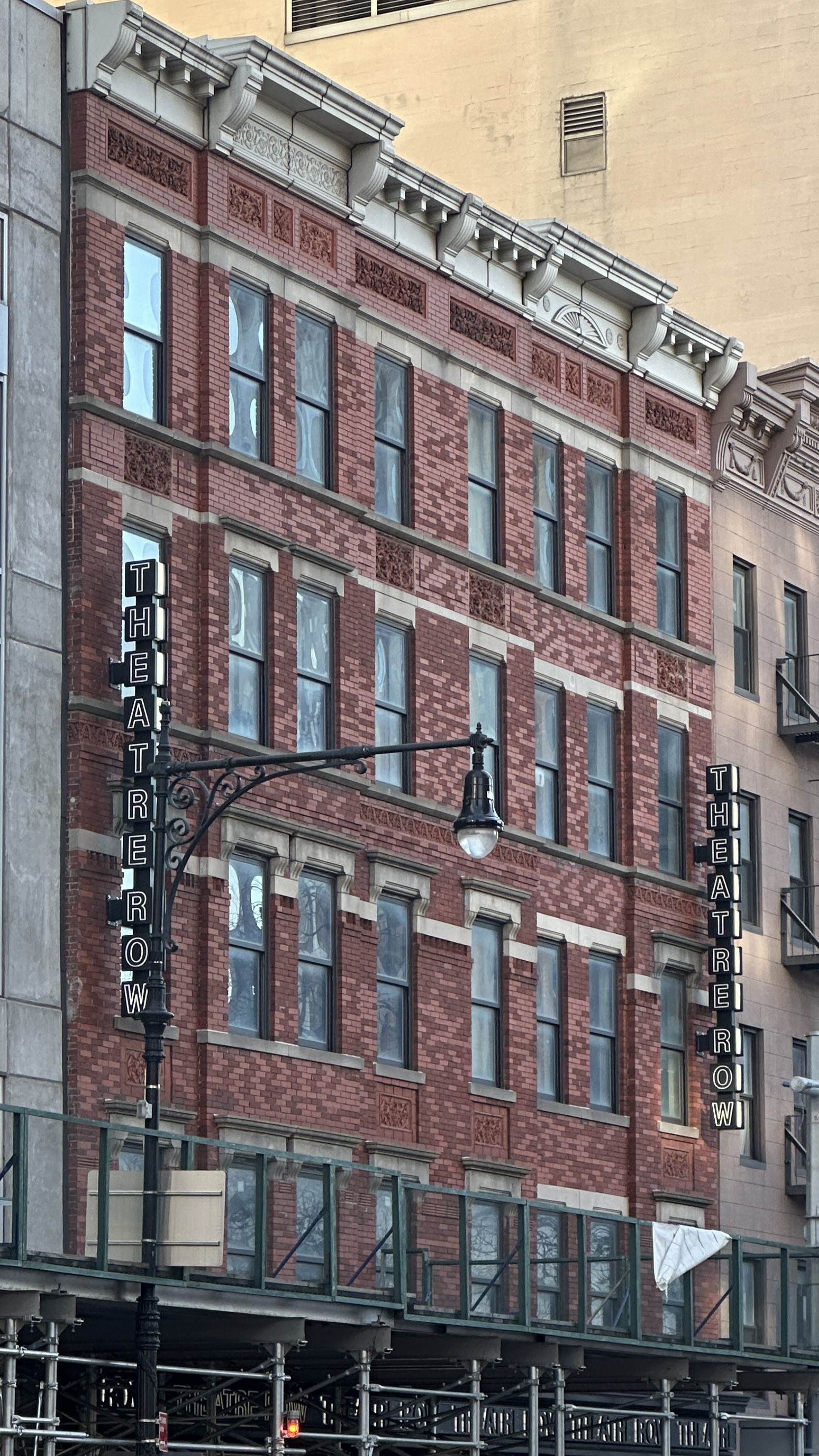
- The Theatre Row Building is one of several theatres that make up the district theatre entrances

- Location within Manhattan Location within New York Location within the United States
- Address: West 42nd Street Between Ninth and Eleventh Avenues; New York City
- Coordinates: 40°45′31″N 73°59′36″W
- Type: Off-Broadway

Theatre Row is an entertainment district of Off Broadway theatres on 42nd Street in the Midtown and Hell's Kitchen neighborhoods of Manhattan in New York City, west of Ninth Avenue. The space originally referred to a 1977 redevelopment project to convert adult entertainment venues into theatres between Ninth and Tenth Avenues on the south side of 42nd Street. However, with the success of the district the name is often used to describe any theatre on either side of the street from Ninth Avenue to the Hudson River as more theatres have been built along the street.

From east to west, theatres along Theatre Row are:

- Laurie Beechman Theatre
- Theatre Row Building
- Playwrights Horizons
- Stage 42 (formerly the Little Shubert Theatre)
- Pershing Square Signature Center
- Theater 555

== Original 1977 theatres ==
Theatre Row was first established in 1977 in conjunction with the 42nd Street Development Corporation in an effort to convert adult entertainment venues into Off Broadway theatres. The first theatres involved in 1977 were:

- Black Theatre Alliance
- Harlem Children's Theatre
- INTAR Theatre (now on 52nd Street)
- Lion Theatre (now commemorated by a theatre in the Theatre Row Building)
- Nat Horne Musical Theatre
- Playwrights Horizons
- Harold Clurman Theatre (now commemorated by a theatre in the Theatre Row Building)
- South Street Theatre

== History of theatres ==
- Laurie Beechman Theatre

Originally opened by Steve Olsen in 1978 as a restaurant known as the West Bank Cafe. Later in 1983, Steve Olsen created a downstairs theatre and named the restaurant as the West Bank Cafe Downstairs Theater Bar. After Laurie Beechman's passing in 1998, the theater was later renamed to Laurie Beechman Theatre honoring the late Broadway & Cabaret icon. Currently, the dinner theater is owned by Broadway Theater producers Tom and Michael D'Angora. Renovated by David Rockwell in 2025, the theater's "design concept celebrates the space's rich and diverse history."

- Theatre Row Building

With the 42nd Street Development Corporation (42SDC) forming in 1976, their goal was to redevelop and revitalize 42nd Street. Founded by Fred Papert, Jacqueline Kennedy Onassis became director on April 7, 1977. With the transformation beginning in August 1977, Theatre Row's grand opening was held on May 13, 1978. Through efforts from 42SDC, Port Authority, Playwrights Horizons, and the Shubert and Brodsky organizations, the Theatre Row Street underwent redevelopment in 1999. Additionally, the Theatre Row building was redesigned by architect Hugh Hardy and SLCE Architects. In November 2002, the newly developed Theatre Row consisted of 5 theatres, "The Acorn" with 199 seats, "The Clurman", "The Beckett", and "The Kirk" with 99 seats, and on the ground floor, "The Lion" with 88 seats. On June 17, 2019, Theatre Row opened to the public once again with renovations designed by Marta Sander of Architecture Outfit.

- Playwrights Horizons

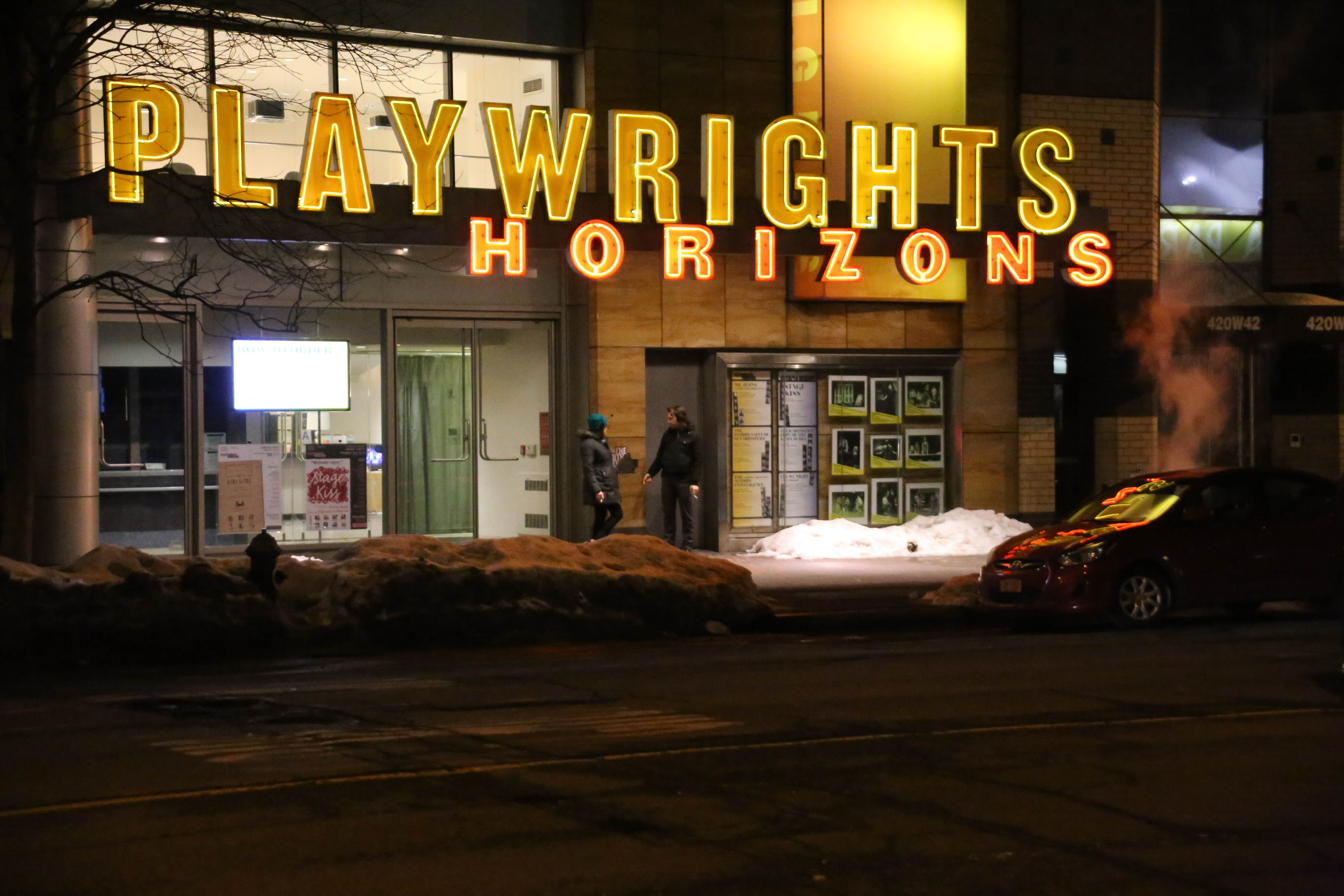
Playwrights Horizons Building

In 1974 when founder Robert Moss moved Playwrights Horizons into 42nd Street, their neighbors consisted of massage parlors and adult shops. Through communications with 42SDC founder Fred Papert, the goal of the revitalization project was to develop theatre productions at affordable prices to bring in paying visitors. While Robert Moss founded the company in 1971, he was only artistic director from 1971 to 1980. Through time, Tim Sanford, who originally started as an intern in 1984, became artistic director of Playwrights Horizon in 1996. Through 42SDC's redevelopment projects in 1999, Playwrights Horizons opened its new building in 2003. When Stanford stepped down in July 2020, Adam Greenfield took over as artistic director. Notably, Casey York became managing director of Playwrights Horizons in 2024 after being with the company since 2010.
