= Show-Score =

Theatre review website

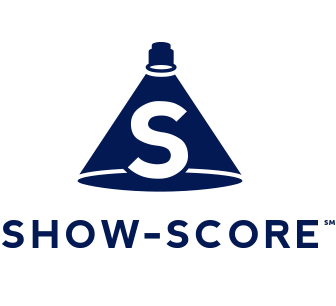
- Website type: New York City & London theatre review aggregator and user community
- Available in: English
- Owner: TodayTix Group
- Website: show-score.com
- Commercial: Yes
- Registration: Optional
- Launched: September 2015

Show-Score is an independent leisure website founded in 2015 as a New York City theatre review aggregator, community review site, and ticket finder. It has been likened to "the Rotten Tomatoes for theatre" and also to TripAdvisor, and provides a 'leaderboard' of most active reviewers and most liked shows. However, it is not limited to numerical reviews. As of March 2017 its userbase of 125,000 had submitted nearly 200,000 reviews, an increase of more than 50% over August 2016. Founded by Tom Melcher and co-founded by Deeksha Gaur, it is currently focused on New York City, but hopes to expand by virtue of increased funding received in early 2017. It has been used as a source for USA Today, ABC News, and others. It was acquired by TodayTix in July 2020, and is now part of the TodayTix Group along with London Theatre, New York Theatre Guide, Broadway Roulette and Goldstar.
