= Theatre Row Building =

Off-Broadway theaters in Manhattan, New York

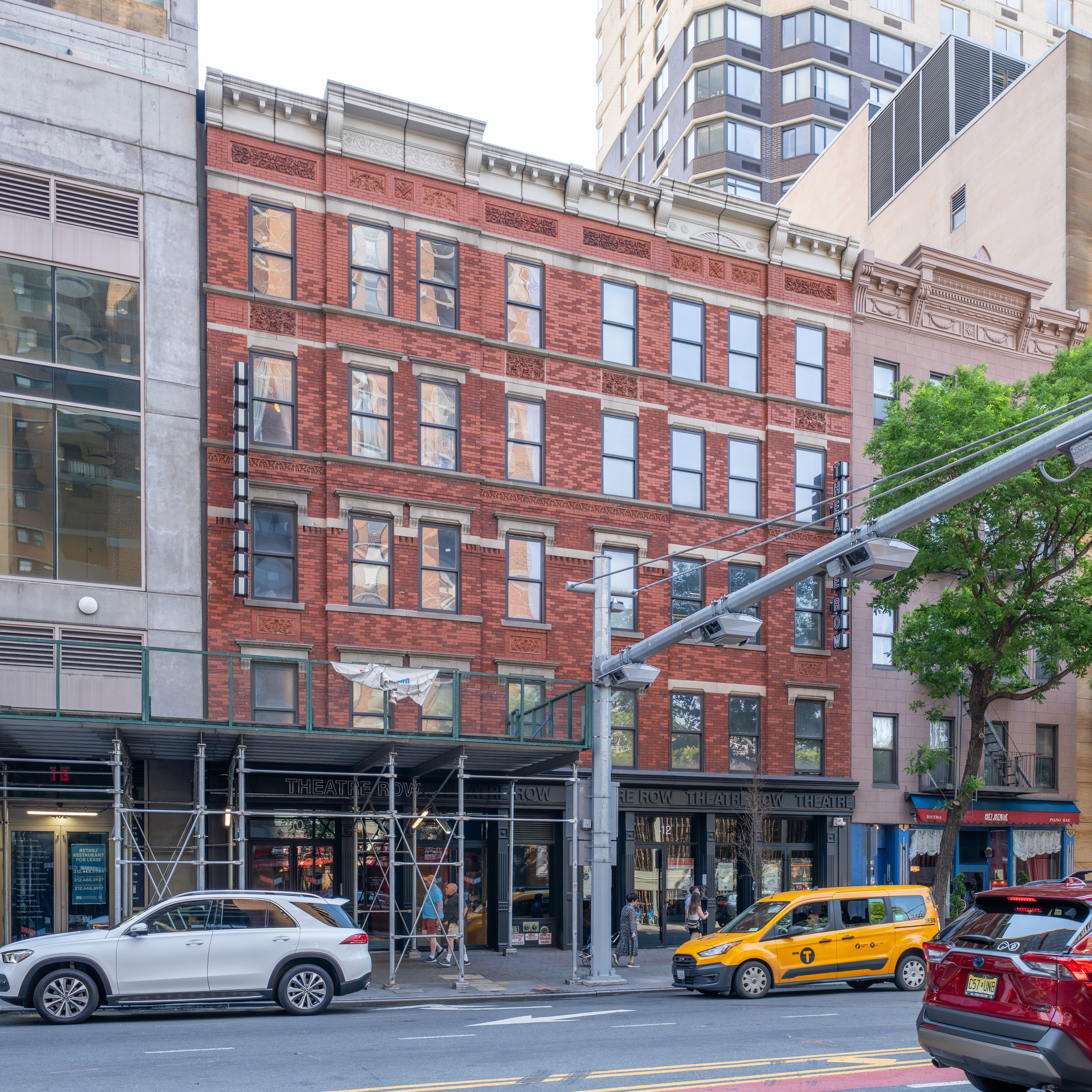
- (2026)

- Location within Manhattan Location within New York Location within the United States
- Address: 410 West 42nd Street; Manhattan, New York City
- Coordinates: 40°45′31″N 73°59′36″W
- Owner: Building for the Arts
- Capacity: Theatre One: 88; Theatre Two: 99; Theatre Three: 199; Theatre Four: 99; Theatre Five: 99; Studio Theatre: 55
- Type: Off-Broadway

Website
- www.theatrerow.org

The Theatre Row Building is a complex of five Off-Broadway theatres at 410 West 42nd Street on Theatre Row in Hell's Kitchen, Manhattan, New York City. The building is owned by the 501(c)(3) organization non-profit Building for the Arts and is the center piece of an effort to transform the adult entertainment district on 42nd Street between Ninth Avenue and Tenth Avenue into an Off-Broadway theater district.

== History ==
The 42nd Street Development Corporation (now named the Building for the Arts) was formed in 1976 by Fred Papert with a mission of working to revitalize all of 42nd Street which had become home to numerous pornographic businesses. In 1977 Jacqueline Kennedy Onassis was elected to its board and in 1977 it began a process to replace porn stores between 9th Avenue and Dyer on the south side of the street with off Broadway theatres, rehearsal spaces and offices. Among the bigger adult venues being replaced were the 42nd Street Playhouse which had signs advertising "All Live Burlesk" and Mermaid. In the same year the Manhattan Plaza apartment tower opened on the north side of 42nd. The first theatre renovations were dedicated in 1978 with Walter Mondale, Joan Mondale and Ed Koch among those attending. The transformation of the district was highlighted in the scenes and settings for the 1981 film Tootsie.

Audiences to the Off Broadway venues noted in the 1980s that the buildings still maintained the rough edges of their porn history with poor seating, poor bathrooms and air conditioning that worked intermediately so in 1999, under Theatre Row Managing Director Ray Cullom, the core of the Theatre Row Buildings were gut renovated and rebuilt from the ground up with the five theatres opening in brand new spaces in 2002 in the original five-story brick building (even as tall apartment towers rose adjacent to it).

In 2019 the theatre complex was renovated and the individual theatres renamed.

== Theatres ==
- Theatre One, formerly the Lion Theatre, with 88 seats. It sits on the site of the original Clurman Theatre and was named for the Lion Theatre which was one of the original theatres to open on Theatre Row in 1977.
- Theatre Two, formerly the Rodney Kirk Theatre, with 99 seats. The former name honored Rev. Rodney Kirk, first Director of the Development (1977–1997) for the nearby, arts-linked, Manhattan Plaza residential project.
- Theatre Three, formerly the Acorn Theatre, is the largest in the complex with 199 seats.
- Theatre Four, formerly the Samuel Beckett Theatre, with 99 seats.
- Theatre Five, formerly the Harold Clurman Theatre, with 99 seats. The former name honored Harold Clurman, one of the three founders of the Group Theatre collective in 1931.
- Studio Theatre which is a 55-seat black box theater
